= 151st Air Refueling Squadron =

Tennessee Air National Guard unit

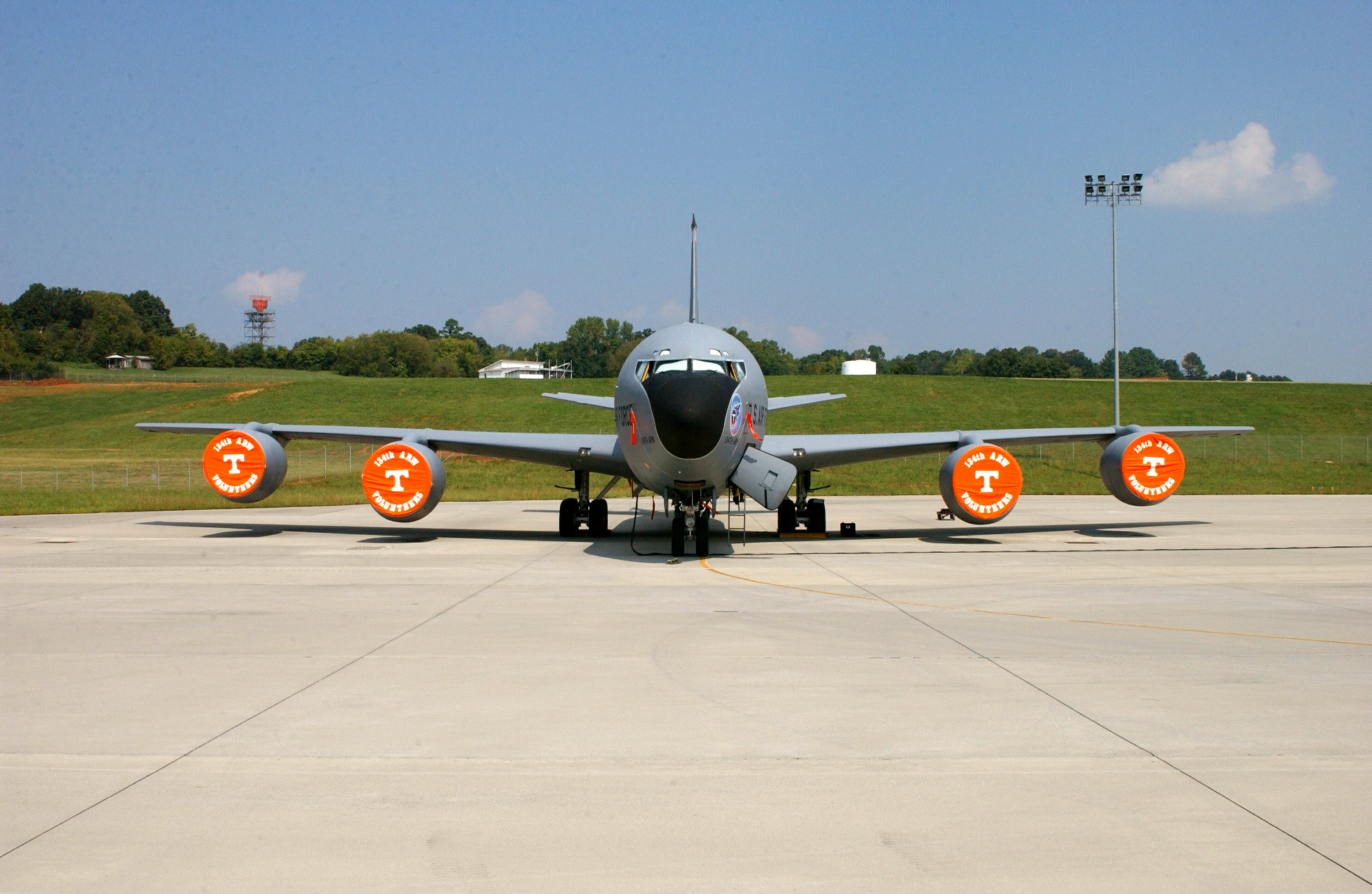
- A 151st ARS KC-135R Stratotanker.
- Active: 15 December 1957-Present
- Country: United States
- Allegiance: Tennessee
- Branch: Air National Guard
- Type: Squadron
- Role: Aerial refueling
- Part of: Tennessee Air National Guard
- Garrison/HQ: McGhee Tyson Air National Guard Base, Knoxville, Tennessee
- Tail Code: White tail stripe, "Tennessee" in orange letters

Insignia
- 151st Air Refueling Squadron emblem

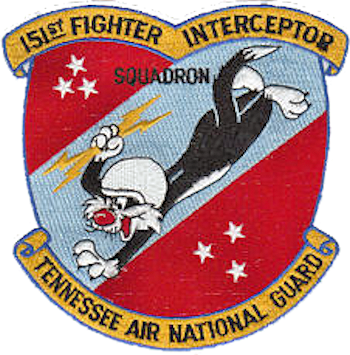
- 151st Fighter-Interceptor Squadron emblem

The 151st Air Refueling Squadron (151 ARS) is a unit of the Tennessee Air National Guard 134th Air Refueling Wing located at McGhee Tyson Air National Guard Base, Knoxville, Tennessee. The 151st is equipped with the KC-135R Stratotanker.

== History ==
The squadron was constituted and allotted to the Air National Guard in 1957 to replace the active-duty 469th Fighter-Interceptor Squadron at McGhee Tyson Airport, Knoxville, Tennessee. It was activated on 15 December 1957 and federally recognized the next day as part of the new 134th Fighter-Interceptor Group.

=== Air Defense ===
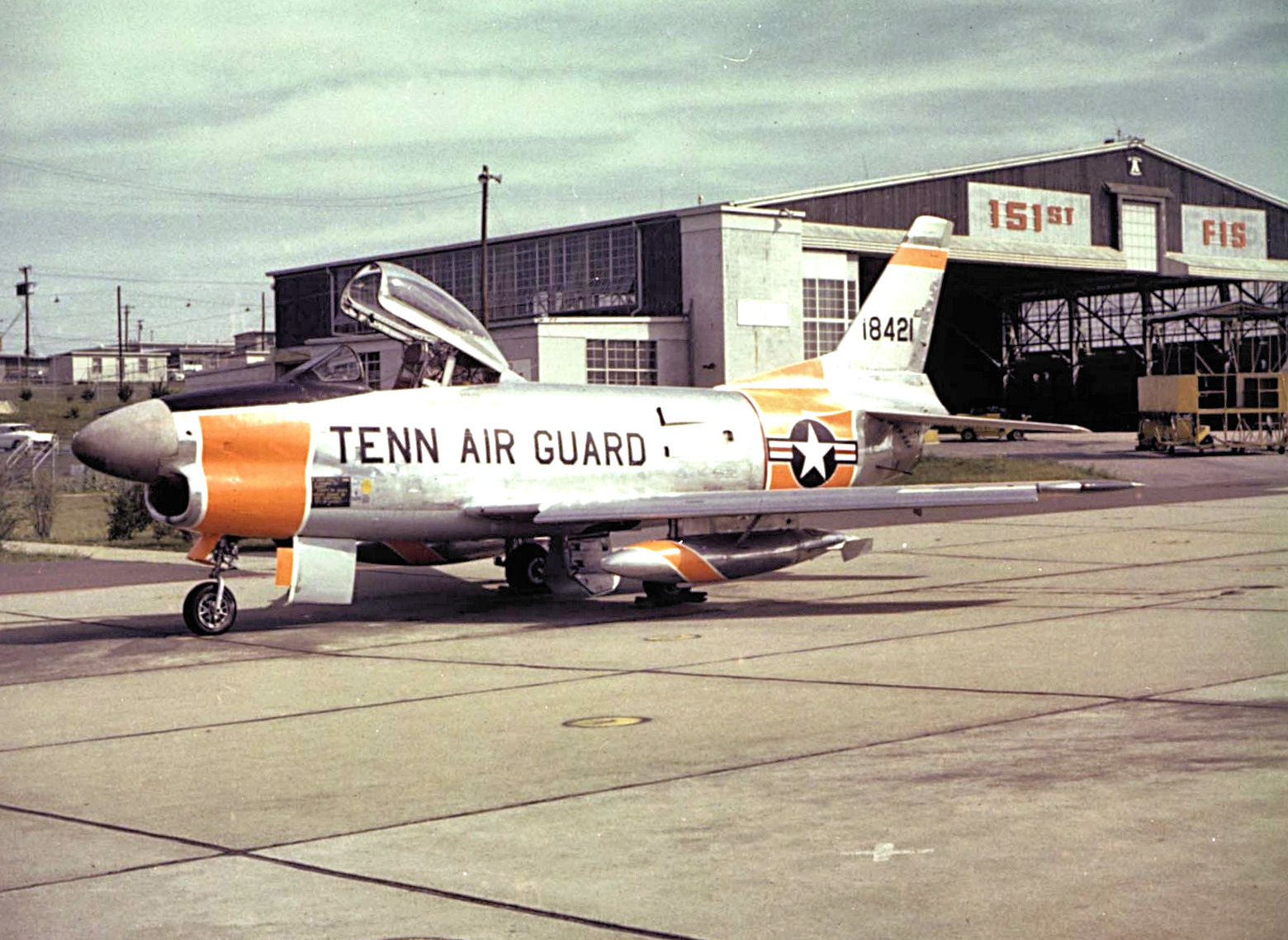
A 151st Fighter Interceptor Squadron F-86D in the 1950s

The 151st Fighter-Interceptor Squadron was the third Tennessee Air National Guard flying squadron. It was equipped with North American F-86D Sabre interceptors with a mission of air defense in the area including the Oak Ridge National Laboratory and the strategic Alcoa aluminum manufacturing facilities in the area. The active-duty Air Force 469th Fighter-Interceptor Squadron was inactivated on 8 January 1958, with the 151st taking over the Air Defense Command (ADC) daytime alert mission in October, a status that was estimated to take two years.

ADC released all its supersonic Lockheed F-104A Starfighters to the Air National Guard in 1960 because its fire control system was not sophisticated enough to make it an all weather interceptor. The 151st was one of the Guard squadrons that re-equipped with these aircraft.

The unit was federalized in November 1961 as a result of the 1961 Berlin Crisis and deployed to Ramstein Air Base, West Germany. At Ramnstein the squadron was assigned to the 86th Air Division of United States Air Forces Europe. In May 1962 while still deployed to Ramstein, the unit set an all-time US Air Force jet fighter monthly flying hour record of 836 hours 5 minutes. In addition, the unit had the highest flying time per aircraft assigned ever recorded in the Air Force for jet fighters in any one month to that date. Following the defusing of the Berlin crisis, the 151st returned to Knoxville in August 1962 and reverted to state control.

Following the Cuban Missile Crisis. ADC decided to station a permanent F-104 unit at Homestead Air Force Base, Florida because of the plane's superior fighter on fighter performance. The lack of an all weather capability not a factor at Homestead because Cuba lacked a bomber force. To equip the 319th Fighter-Interceptor Squadron at Homestead and a training squadron at Webb Air Force Base, Texas, the F-104s with the 151st were returned to the active Air Force.

=== Air Refueling ===
The gaining command for the squadron and its parent 134th Fighter Group was transferred from ADC to Tactical Air Command and it was equipped with the Boeing KC-97G Stratotanker with an air refueling mission. Despite its lack of previously qualified aircrew or maintenance personnel, the 134th was still the first Air National Guard flying unit equipped with KC-97's to achieve operational status. It did so in eight months, the previous "normal" time for the conversion was two years. In 1966 the squadron began a rotational deployment to Ramstein Air Base in support of Operation Creek Party, which provided USAFE an air refueling capability. Creek Party deployment rotations lasted until 1976, and over the decade the 151st saw millions of pounds of jet fuel off-loaded and millions of miles flown, all accident free.

In July 1976 the KC-97s were retired and replaced by jet Boeing KC-135A Stratotankers. Strategic Air Command then became the squadron's gaining command on mobilization. Once again the squadron achieved combat operational status in record time. These squadron's aircraft were later upgraded to KC-135E models in 1982 and finally replaced with KC-135R models in 2006.

The Volunteer spirit has always been alive and well in east Tennessee. This spirit was highlighted by former base commander Gen. Frederick H. Forster (Ret.) when he noted that at the beginning of the call up for Operation Desert Shield Tennessee had more volunteers than they needed. The unit has also played an enormous part in Operation Noble Eagle, Operation Enduring Freedom and Operation Iraqi Freedom by deploying numerous times to several Continental United States and Middle East locations. This deployment marks the first time a Traditional Air Guard band has been tasked to deploy.

=== Lineage ===
- Constituted as the 151st Fighter-Interceptor Squadron and allotted to the National Guard on 7 December 1957

Activated on 15 December 1957
Extended federal recognition on 16 December 1957
Federalized and placed on active duty on 1 November 1961
Released from active duty and returned to Tennessee state control on 15 August 1962
Redesignated 151st Air Refueling Squadron, Medium on 18 April 1964
Redesignated 151st Air Refueling Squadron, Heavy on 1 November 1976
Redesignated 151st Air Refueling Squadron on 16 March 1992

=== Assignments ===
- 134th Fighter-Interceptor Group, 15 December 1957
- 86th Air Division, 25 November 1961
- 134th Fighter-Interceptor Group (later 134th Air Refueling Group), 11 July 1962
- 134th Operations Group, 1 October 1995

=== Stations ===
- McGhee Tyson Airport (later McGhee Tyson Air National Guard Base), Tennessee, 15 December 1957

Operated from: Ramstein Air Base, West Germany, Nov 1961-15 Aug 1962
Designated: McGhee Tyson Air National Guard Base, Tennessee, 1991-Present

=== Aircraft ===
- North American F-86D Sabre, 1957–1960
- Lockheed F-104A Starfighter, 1960–1963
- Convair F-102A Delta Dagger, 1963–1964
- Boeing KC-97L Stratotanker, 1964–1976
- Boeing KC-135A Stratotanker, 1976–1982
- Boeing KC-135E Stratotanker, 1982–2006
- Boeing KC-135R Stratotanker, 2006–Present
- KC-46 Pegasus, 8 planned from 2031
