= List of Cold War Air National Guard Mobilizations =

After the Korean War, the first major Cold War crisis began on 13 August 1961, when Berliners woke up to find they lived in a divided city. A wall now separated East Berlin from West Berlin. With that provocative act, the Soviet Union ratcheted up the Cold War.

In response to Soviet moves to cut off allied access to Berlin, The Air National Guard was mobilized in October 1961. included 18 tactical fighter squadrons, 4 tactical reconnaissance squadrons, 6 air transport squadrons, and a tactical control group. On 1 November; the Air Force mobilized three more ANG fighter interceptor squadrons. In late October and early November, eight of the tactical fighter units flew to Europe with their 216 aircraft in operation "Stair Step," the largest jet deployment in the Air Guard's history.

The Vietnam War provided the next significant test for the Air Guard, with Airlift units began flying supply missions to Vietnam in 1965. However, for largely domestic political reasons, President Lyndon B. Johnson chose not to mobilize most of the nation's reserve forces before 1968. However, after the 1968 Tet Offensive in which the Communist North Vietnamese and Vietcong troops attacked positions throughout the Republic of Vietnam, the ANG was mobilized for service.

The ANG was mobilized twice during the Vietnam War. Four tactical fighter squadrons—the 120th (Colorado), 174th (Iowa), 188th (New Mexico), and 136th (New York)--deployed to Vietnam in 1968. And although not an Air National Guard unit, the National Guard can claim credit for a fifth squadron, the 355th: 85% of this tactical fighter squadron's personnel were Air Guard volunteers from New Jersey and the District of Columbia.

Eleven additional squadrons were called up in 1968 in response to the seizing of the U.S. Navy ship Pueblo by North Korea, and two tactical fighter squadrons, the 166th (Ohio) and the 127th (Kansas) were sent to South Korea. In May 1968 one aeromedical airservice group and two tactical fighter groups were federalized.

The last of the mobilized Air National Guard units returned to reserve status in June 1969. Guardsmen, however, continued to support active-duty units in South Vietnam with specialized missions until 1972.

Unit	State	Date Mobilized	Location	Demobilization Date	Comments
102d Tactical Fighter Wing	Massachusetts	1 October 1961	France	31 August 1962	Berlin Crisis: Deployed to Phalsbourg-Bourscheid AB; consisted of elements of: 101st TFS, (MA), 131st TFS (MA), 138th TFS (NY); F-86H Sabre
104th Tactical Fighter Squadron	Maryland	13 May 1968	Cannon AFB, NM	20 December 1968	F-86H Sabres; assigned to 175th TFG; Trained active Air Force pilots in forward air controller duties.
109th Air Transport Squadron	Minnesota	1 October 1961	Minneapolis-St Paul MAP, MN	31 August 1962	Berlin Crisis: C-97 Stratofreighter; assigned to 133d ATW; Augmented MATS airlift capability
113th Tactical Fighter Wing	District of Columbia	26 January 1968	Myrtle Beach AFB, SC	17 June 1969	Filler replacement for deployed 354th TFW.
115th Air Transport Squadron	California	1 October 1961	Van Nuys MAP, CA	31 August 1962	Berlin Crisis: C-97 Stratofreighter; assigned to 146th ATW; Augmented MATS airlift capability
119th Tactical Fighter Squadron	New Jersey	26 January 1968	Myrtle Beach AFB, SC	17 June 1969	F-100C Super Sabres; assigned to 113th TFW
120th Tactical Fighter Squadron	Colorado	26 January 1968	South Vietnam	30 April 1969	Deployed to Phan Rang AB, South Vietnam, F-100C Super Sabres; assigned to 35th TFW; first deployed ANG fighter squadron of the Vietnam War.
121st Tactical Fighter Squadron	District of Columbia	26 January 1968	Myrtle Beach AFB, SC	18 June 1969	F-100C Super Sabres; filler replacement for deployed 354th TFW.
123d Tactical Reconnaissance Wing	Kentucky	26 January 1968	Richards-Gebaur AFB, MO	9 June 1969	Functioned as the primary Air Force tactical reconnaissance platform in the continental U.S. Elements rotated temporary duty assignments to Itazuke Air Base, Japan from July 1968 until April 1969 providing photo reconnaissance support to American forces in those areas during Pueblo Crisis.
125th Air Transport Squadron	Oklahoma	1 October 1961	Tulsa IAP, OK	31 August 1962	Berlin Crisis: C-97 Stratofreighter; assigned to 133d ATW; Augmented MATS airlift capability
127th Tactical Fighter Squadron	Kansas	26 January 1968	South Korea	18 June 1969	Deployed to Kusan AB, South Korea; F-100C Super Sabres; assigned to 354th TFW during Pueblo Crisis
133d Air Transport Squadron	New Hampshire	1 October 1961	Grenier AFB, NH	31 August 1962	Berlin Crisis: C-97 Stratofreighter; assigned to 133d ATW; Augmented MATS airlift capability
133d Air Transport Wing	Minnesota	1 October 1961	Minneapolis-St Paul MAP, MN	31 August 1962	Berlin Crisis: C-97 Stratofreighter; Augmented MATS airlift capability
134th Tactical Fighter Group	Tennessee	1 November 1961	West Germany	15 August 1962	Berlin Crisis: Deployed to Ramstein AB; F-104A Starfighters; Assigned to 86th AD; Reinforced USAFE Air Defense Interceptor force.
136th Tactical Fighter Squadron	New York	26 January 1968	South Vietnam	11 June 1969	Deployed to Tuy Hoa AB, South Vietnam, F-100D Super Sabres; assigned to 31st TFW
138th Tactical Fighter Squadron	New York	13 May 1968	Cannon AFB, NM	20 December 1968	F-86H Sabres; assigned to 174th TFG; Trained active Air Force pilots in forward air controller duties.
139th Air Transport Squadron	New York	1 October 1961	Stratton AFB, NY	31 August 1962	Berlin Crisis: C-97 Stratofreighter; assigned to 133d ATW; Augmented MATS airlift capability
146th Air Transport Wing	California	1 October 1961	Van Nuys MAP, CA	31 August 1962	Berlin Crisis: C-97 Stratofreighter; Augmented MATS airlift capability
147th Aeromedical Airlift Squadron	Pennsylvania	13 May 1968	Scott AFB, IL	12 December 1968	C-131 Samaritan; assigned to 171st AAG. transported patients from casualty staging bases and military installations in South Vietnam to destination treatment hospitals.
151st Tactical Fighter Squadron	Tennessee	1 November 1961	West Germany	15 August 1962	Berlin Crisis: Deployed to Ramstein AB; F-104A Starfighters; Assigned to 134th TFG
154th Tactical Reconnaissance Squadron	Arkansas	26 January 1968	Richards-Gebaur AFB, MO	20 December 1968	RF-101C; assigned to 123d TRW during Pueblo Crisis.
157th Tactical Fighter Squadron	South Carolina	1 November 1961	Spain	15 August 1962	Berlin Crisis: F-104A Starfighters; Assigned to 169th TFG
161st Tactical Fighter Group	Arizona	1 November 1961	West Germany	15 August 1962	Berlin Crisis: Deployed to Ramstein AB; F-104A Starfighters; Assigned to 86th AD; Reinforced USAFE Air Defense Interceptor force.
165th Tactical Reconnaissance Squadron	Kentucky	26 January 1968	Richards-Gebaur AFB, MO	9 June 1969	RF-101C; assigned to 123d TRW during Pueblo Crisis.
166th Tactical Fighter Squadron	Ohio	26 January 1968	South Korea	18 June 1969	Deployed to Kusan AB, South Korea; F-100C Super Sabres; assigned to 354th TFW during Pueblo Crisis
169th Tactical Fighter Group	South Carolina	1 November 1961	Spain	15 August 1962	Berlin Crisis: Deployed to Moran AB; F-104A Starfighters; Assigned to 86th AD; Reinforced USAFE Air Defense Interceptor force.
171st Aeromedical Airlift Group	Pennsylvania	13 May 1968	Scott AFB, IL	12 December 1968	Assigned to 375th Aeromedical Airlift Wing. Augmented airlift capability
174th Tactical Fighter Squadron	Iowa	26 January 1968	South Vietnam	28 May 1968	Deployed to Phu Cat AB, South Vietnam, F-100D Super Sabres; assigned to 37th TFW
174th Tactical Fighter Group	New York	13 May 1968	Cannon AFB, NM	20 December 1968	Filler replacement for deployed 27th TFW.
175th Tactical Fighter Group	Maryland	13 May 1968	Cannon AFB, NM	20 December 1968	Filler replacement for deployed 27th TFW
188th Tactical Fighter Squadron	New Mexico	26 January 1968	South Vietnam	4 June 1969	Deployed to Tuy Hoa AB, South Vietnam, F-100D Super Sabres; assigned to 31st TFW
192d Tactical Reconnaissance Squadron	Nevada	26 January 1968	Richards-Gebaur AFB, MO	7 June 1969	RF-101C; assigned to 123d TRW during Pueblo Crisis.
195th Air Transport Squadron	California	1 October 1961	Van Nuys MAP, CA	31 August 1962	Berlin Crisis: C-97 Stratofreighter; assigned to 146th ATW; Augmented MATS airlift capability
197th Tactical Fighter Squadron	Arizona	1 November 1961	West Germany	15 August 1962	Berlin Crisis: Deployed to Ramstein AB; F-104A Starfighters; Assigned to 161st TFG
7108th Tactical Wing	Provisional*	1 October 1961	France	30 August 1962	Berlin Crisis: Chaumont-Semoutiers AB; consisted of elements of:: 108th Tactical Fighter Wing (NJ), 119th TFS (NJ), 141st TFS (NJ), 149th TFS (VA); F-84F Thunderstreak
7117th Tactical Wing	Provisional*	1 October 1961	France	31 August 1962	Berlin Crisis: Dreux-Louvilliers AB; consisted of elements of: 117th Tactical Reconnaissance Wing (AL), 106th TRS (AL), 153d TRS (MS), 160th TRS (AL), 184th TRS (AZ); RF-84F Thunderstreak
7121st Tactical Wing	Provisional*	1 October 1961	France	31 August 1962	Berlin Crisis: Étain-Rouvres AB; consisted of elements of: 121st Tactical Fighter Wing (OH), 162d TFS (OH), 164th TFS (OH), 166th TFS (OH); F-84F Thunderstreak
7122d Tactical Wing	Provisional*	1 October 1961	France	31 August 1962	Berlin Crisis: Chambley-Bussières AB; consisted of elements of: 122d Tactical Fighter Wing (IN), 112th TFS (OH), 113th TFS (IN), 163d TFS (IN); F-84F Thunderstreak
7123d Tactical Wing	Provisional*	1 October 1961	France	31 August 1962	Berlin Crisis: Toul-Rosières AB; consisted of elements of: 131st Tactical Fighter Wing (MO), 110th TFS, (MO), 169th TFS (IL), 170th TFS (IL); F-84F Thunderstreak

- Note: Due to DOD budget restrictions, the provisional 7108th, 7117th, 7121st, 7122d and 7123d Tactical Wings consisted only of the wing headquarters squadron and a single fighter squadron in France. The remaining wing components and attached fighter squadrons remained in the United States, ready to deploy if necessary. Personnel and aircraft of the CONUS-based squadrons rotated to France during the period of the wing deployment to reduce the deployment periods of the overseas personnel. The 106th TRS, 149th TFS, 166th TFS, 163d TFS and 170th TFS deployed personnel/equipment/aircraft.

After the Air National Guard unit personnel returned to the United States, USAFE formed the active-duty 366th Tactical Fighter Wing and four Tactical Fighter Squadrons from the equipment and F-84F aircraft deployed by the ANG units at the French bases used by the provisional Tactical Wings.

== See also ==
- Air National Guard
