= 119th Command and Control Squadron =

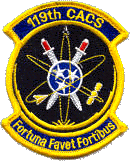
- 119th Command and Control Squadron emblem
- Active: 1949–1953; 1953–1965; 1965–present
- Country: United States
- Branch: United States Air Force
- Type: Command and control
- Role: Space operations
- Part of: Tennessee Air National Guard
- Garrison/HQ: McGhee Tyson ANGB, Tennessee
- Motto: Fortuna Favet Fortibus (Latin for 'Fortune Favors the Strong')
- Decorations: Joint Meritorious Unit Award; Air Force Outstanding Unit Award

The United States Air Force's 119th Command and Control Squadron (119 CACS) is a space control unit located at McGhee Tyson ANGB, Tennessee. The unit augments the operations of USSTRATCOM on a continuous basis.

== Mission ==
The 119th Command and Control Squadron was one of the first Air National Guard units to become a part of the United States Space Command (later United States Strategic Command) (USSTRATCOM). Its mission is augmentation for USSTRATCOM's global operations center which coordinates and directs the use of the Department of Defense’s military space forces.

The 119th provides support to Headquarters USSTRATCOM via three primary Command and Control mission areas: Global Operations, Homeland Defense Operations, and Natural Disaster Events.

== History ==
The 119 was originally activated as 119th Tactical Control Squadron in 1965, replacing the 119th Aircraft Control and Warning Squadron, which was established in 1949. Since its inception, the 119 ACS had always operated tactical (mobile) radar systems, but was slated to lose its mission and association with Air Combat Command. This provided a fortuitous opportunity for the unit to be associated with USSPACECOM as a direct supporting unit. In the mid-1990s, USSPACECOM commander Gen Howard Estes III directed the command to expand the role of guard and reserve forces in operations from two percent to 20 percent.

== Lineage ==
119th Aircraft Control and Warning Flight

- Constituted as the 119th Aircraft Control and Warning Squadron on 21 March 1949 and allotted to the National Guard

Organized on 1 October 1950
Federally recognized on 6 October 1950
Called to active duty on 1 January 1952
Inactivated and returned to state control on 1 December 1953
Redesignated 119th Aircraft Control and Warning Flight on 1 December 1953 and activated in the National Guard
Inactivated on 1 September 1965

119th Command and Control Squadron

- Constituted as the 119th Tactical Control Squadron (Control and Reporting Center) on 1 August 1965 (Note: The constituting letter does not contain the parenthetical, but the 1976 redesignation letter does.)
- Activated on 1 September 1965
- Redesignated 119th Tactical Control Flight (Forward Air Control Post) on 1 April 1976
- Redesignated 119th Tactical Control Squadron on 15 October 1988
- Redesignated 119th Air Control Squadron on 16 June 1992
- Redesignated 119th Command and Control Squadron on 16 August 2002

=== Assignments ===
- Continental Air Command, 1 October 1950
- 154th Aircraft Control and Warning Group, 1 November 1950
- Fourteenth Air Force, 1 January 1952
- 32nd Air Division, 28 January 1952
- 4707th Defense Wing, 13 February 1953 – 1 December 1953
- 157th Tactical Control Group, 1 December 1953 – 1 September 1965
- 157th Tactical Control Group (later 157th Air Control Group), 1 September 1965 – unknown

=== Stations ===
- Knoxville National Guard Armory, Tennessee, 1 October 1950
- Otis Air Force Base, Massachusetts, 18 January 1952 – 1 December 1953
- Knoxville National Guard Armory, Tennessee, 1 December 1953
- McGhee Tyson Air Force Base (later Alcoa Air National Guard Base), 1956 – 1 September 1965
- Alcoa Air National Guard Base (later McGhee Tyson Air National Guard Base), 1 September 1965 – present

== Commanders ==
- Col Vince Franklin (2012 – unknown)name="Duncan"/>
- Lt Col Luttrell Gus Schettler (2003–2008)
- Lt Col John F. White (1995–2003)
- Lt Col Clyde Huskey(??-??)
- Lt Col Nick Hanson(1987–1993)
- Lt Col Fred Bonney (1974–1987)
- Lt Col James W. Manley (1972–1974)
- Lt Col Arthur P. Wright (1964–1972)
- Maj Oscar L. Williams Jr. (1952–1953)
- Col John R. Douglas (1950–1964)

== Decorations ==
- Air Force Outstanding Unit Award
  - 2 October 2007 – 1 October 2008
  - 1 January 2006 – 1 October 2007
  - 1 January 2000 – 31 December 2001
  - 1 January 1996 – 31 December 1997
  - 1 January 1995 – 31 December 1995
  - 1 January 1990 – 31 December 1991
  - 1 January 1986 – 31 December 1987
  - 1 January 1984 – 31 December 1985
- Joint Meritorious Unit Award
  - 1 January 1999 – 3 September 2002
  - 8 April 1991 – 27 October 1991
- National Guard Meritorious Service Awards × 2
- Air Guard Outstanding Mission Support Squadron Awards × 2
