= 469th Flying Training Squadron =

469th Flying Training Squadron

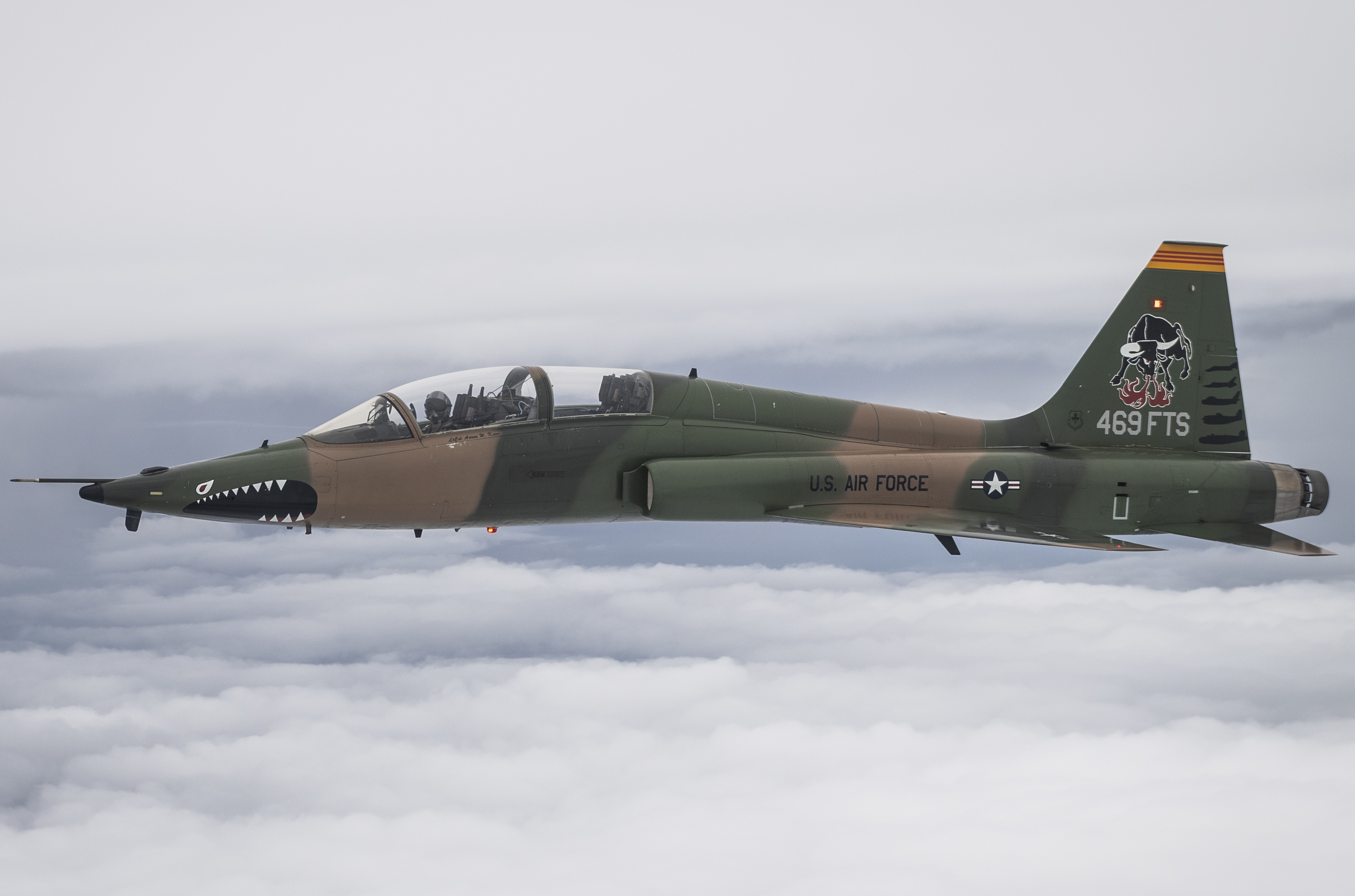
- T-38 Talon of the 469th Flying Training Squadron
- Active: 1942–1944; 1952–1958; 1962–1972; 2009–present
- Country: United States
- Branch: United States Air Force
- Role: Flight training
- Size: 60 multinational personnel and 46 T-38 aircraft
- Part of: Air Education and Training Command
- Garrison/HQ: Sheppard Air Force Base
- Engagements: Vietnam War
- Decorations: Presidential Unit Citation; Air Force Outstanding Unit Award with Combat "V" Device; Air Force Outstanding Unit Award; Republic of Vietnam Gallantry Cross with Palm

Insignia
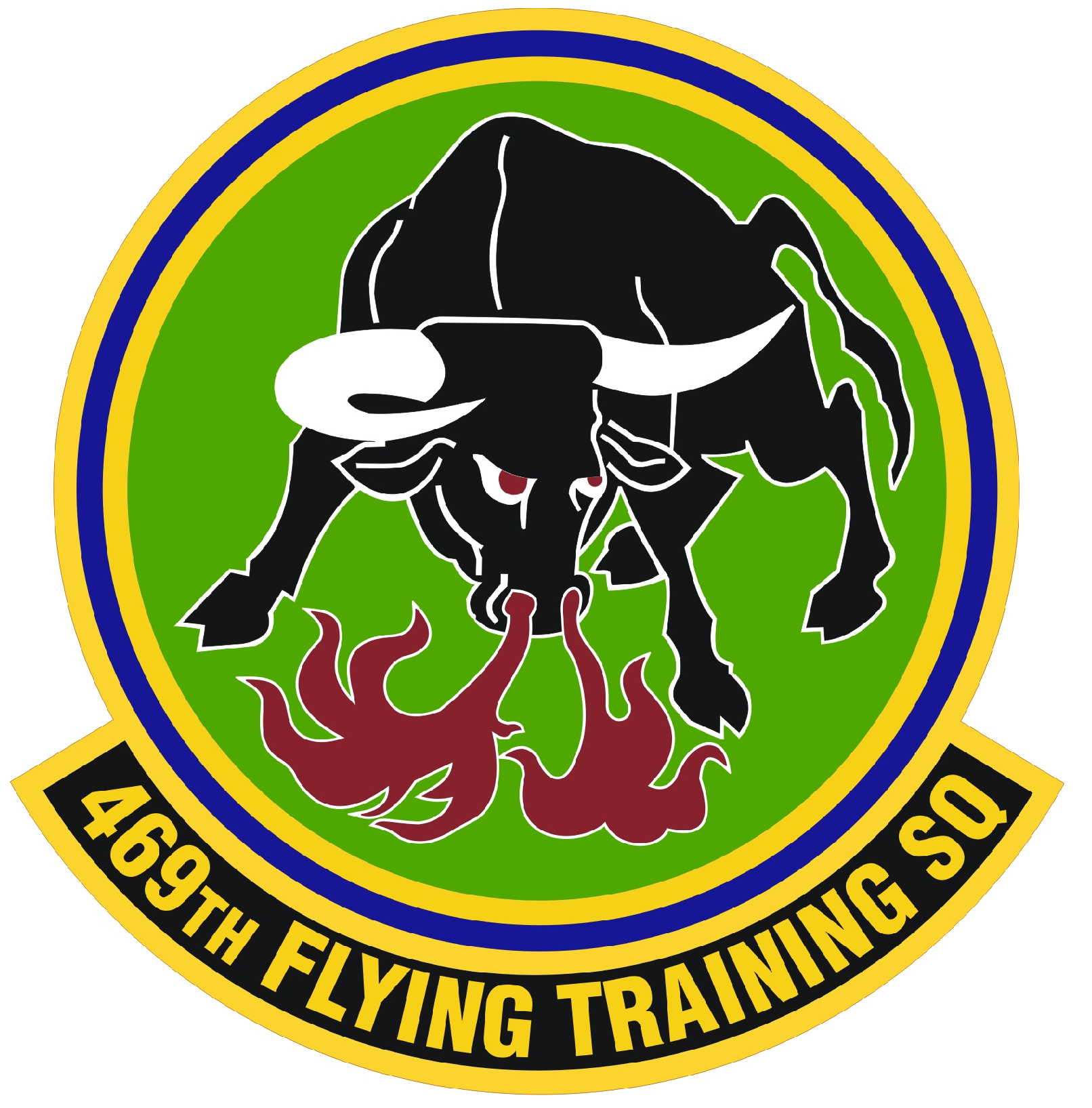
- 469th Flying Training Squadron emblem (Note: Approved 13 April 2009 based on an earlier emblem used by the 469th Tactical Fighter Squadron. Description: On a disc Azure, a bezant surmounted by a pomme charged with a bull poised to attack Sable, fimbriated Argent, eyed Gules, nostrils flared, snorting fire of the fourth [color mentioned], horned of the third [color mentioned], all within a narrow Yellow border. Significance: Ultramarine blue and Air Force yellow are the Air Force colors. Blue represents the sky, the primary theater of Air Force operations. Yellow refers to the sun and the excellence required of Air Force personnel. The bull in his aggressive stance, prepared to fight, represents the aggressive warriors the unit produces to defend the nation.)

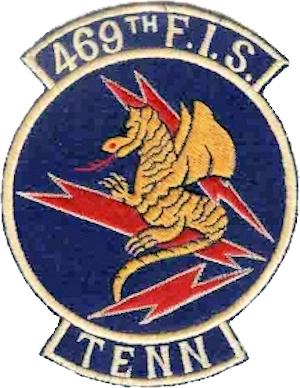
- Patch with 469th Fighter-Interceptor Squadron emblem
- Southeast Asia tail code: JV
- Sheppard AFB tail code: EN

The 469th Flying Training Squadron is part of the 80th Flying Training Wing and is based at Sheppard Air Force Base, Texas.

The first predecessor of the squadron, the 469th Bombardment Squadron, served during World War II as an Operational Training Unit, and later as a Replacement Training Unit. It was inactivated at Dalhart Army Air Field, Texas in the spring of 1944 in a general reorganization of Army Air Forces support and training units in the United States.

The 469th Fighter-Interceptor Squadron, the squadron's second predecessor, was formed in 1952, when it assumed the personnel, equipment, and air defense mission of an Air National Guard unit that was returning to state service after being mobilized for the Korean War. It continued this role until inactivating in 1958.

The squadron, redesignated the 469th Tactical Fighter Squadron, was organized in 1963. Two years later, it deployed to Thailand. It flew combat strike missions, and later forward air control missions, until inactivating in 1972, earning two Presidential Unit Citations for its actions in combat. The two squadrons were consolidated into a single unit in September 1985. The 469th was redesignated and activated in its current role in 2009.

== Mission ==
The squadron provides undergraduate, pilot instructor and continuation training to military personnel of NATO air forces participating in the Euro NATO Joint Jet Pilot Training (ENJJPT) program.

== History ==
=== World War II ===
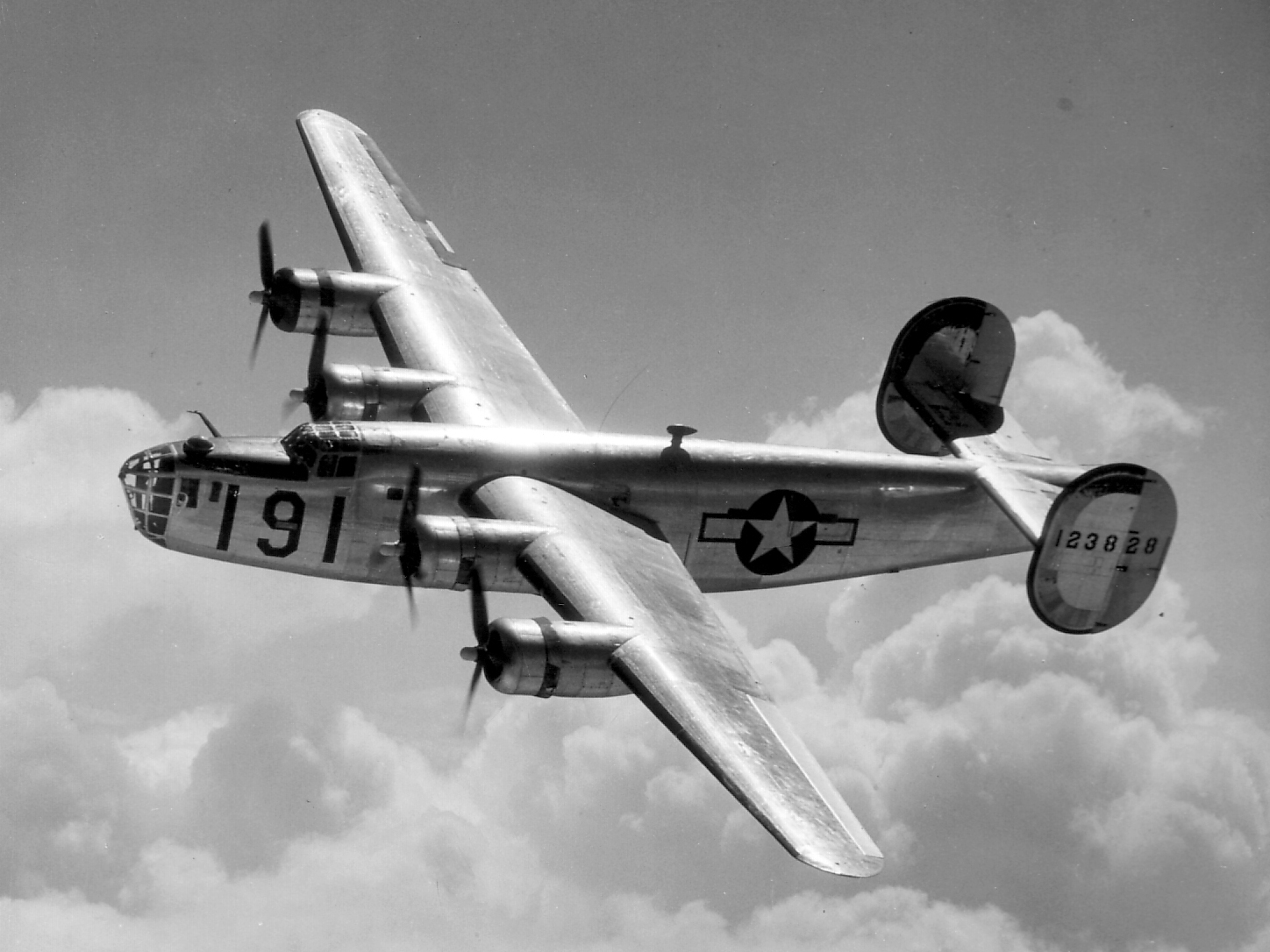
B-24 Liberator of a crew training unit

The 469th Bombardment Squadron was activated on 15 July 1942 at Salt Lake City Army Air Base, Utah as one of the four original squadrons of the 333d Bombardment Group. (Note: Maurer indicates the squadrons of the 333rd Group were activated at Salt Lake, then moved to Topeka in August. Maurer, Combat Squadrons, pp. 573-575. However, the 333rd Group was activated at Topeka, and the Air Force Historical Research Agency Factsheet for the squadron gives Topeka as the 469th's activation station. Maurer, Combat Units, pp.213-14; Robertson, AFHRA Factsheet.) In August, it began operating at Topeka Army Air Base, Kansas as an Operational Training Unit (OTU) for Consolidated B-24 Liberator units. The OTU program involved the use of an oversized parent unit to provide cadres to "satellite groups" The OTU program was patterned after the unit training system of the Royal Air Force. The parent assumed responsibility for satellite unit training and oversaw their expansion with graduates of Army Air Forces Training Command schools to become effective combat units. Phase I training concentrated on individual training in crewmember specialties. Phase II training emphasized the coordination for the crew to act as a team. The final phase concentrated on operation as a unit.

In February 1943, the squadron moved to Dalhart Army Air Field, Texas. However, many of the Army Air Forces' (AAF) bomber units had been activated. With the exception of special programs, like forming Boeing B-29 Superfortress units, training “fillers” for existing units became more important than unit training. The squadron mission changed to becoming a Replacement Training Unit (RTU). RTUs were also oversized units, but their mission was to train individual pilots or aircrews. It continued this mission through November 1943.

The AAF was finding that standard military units like the 469th, whose manning was based on relatively inflexible tables of organization were proving not well adapted to the training mission, even more so to the replacement mission. Accordingly, the Army Air Forces adopted a more functional system in which each base was organized into a separate numbered unit. The 469th and other training and support units at Dalhart were disbanded or inactivated on 1 April 1944. and replaced by the 232d AAF Base Unit. In 1985, the squadron was consolidated with the 469th Tactical Fighter Squadron.

=== Air defense ===
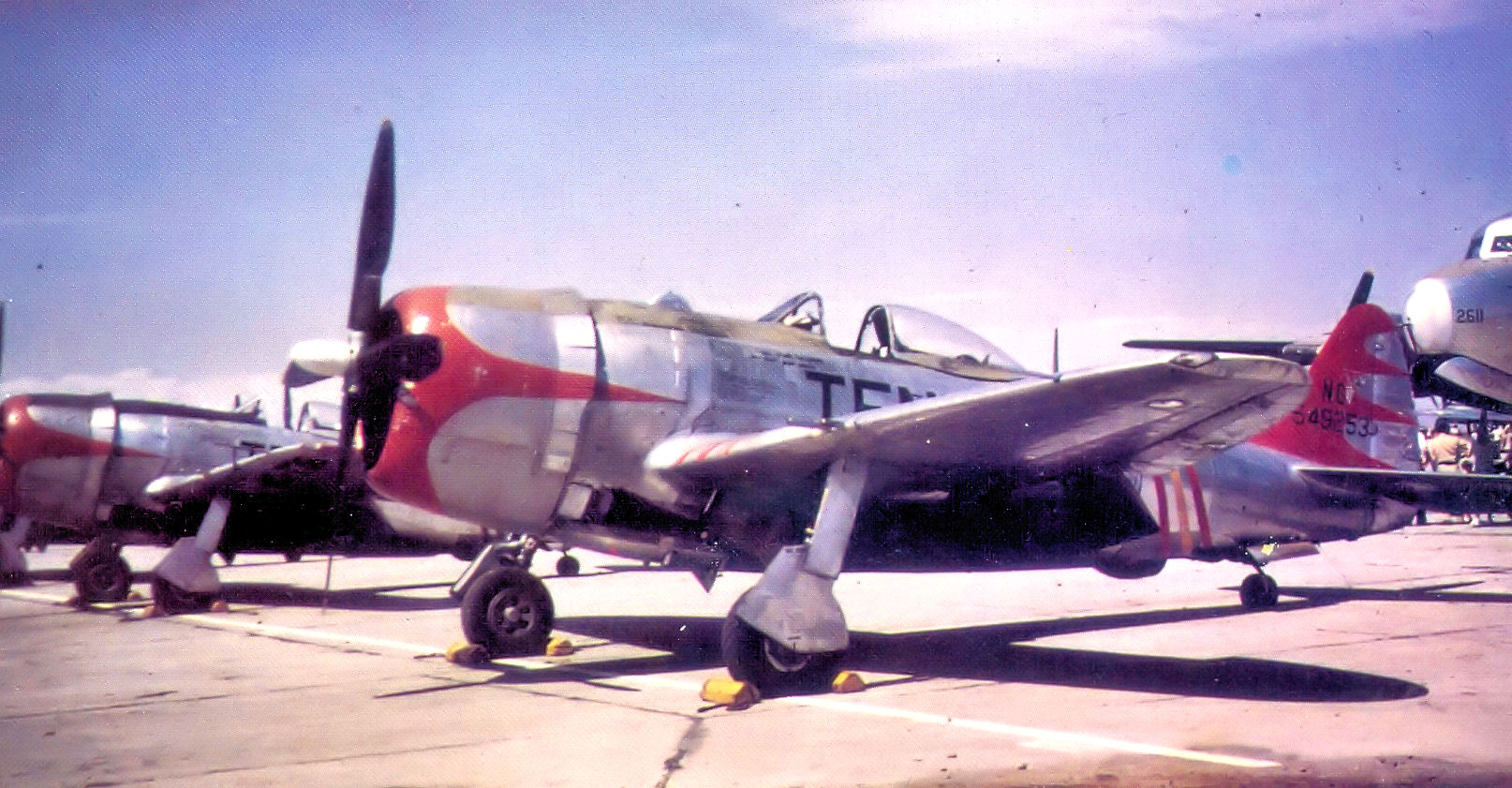
105th Fighter-Interceptor Squadron F-47

The 469th Fighter-Interceptor Squadron was activated at McGhee Tyson Airport, Tennessee on 1 December 1952 and assigned to the 35th Air Division. The squadron assumed the mission, personnel and World War II era Republic F-47 Thunderbolts of the 105th Fighter-Interceptor Squadron, a Tennessee Air National Guard unit that had been mobilized for the Korean War. (Note: Robertson indicates the squadron drew on other National Guard units in addition to the 105th, which was at McGhee Tyson. Robertson, AFHRA Factsheet.) In early 1953, it received long range F-47Ns to replace some of the F-47Ds it had inherited. The 469th provided air defense for the Atomic Energy Commission's Oak Ridge National Laboratory, ALCOA aluminum production facilities and Tennessee Valley Authority electric generating plants.

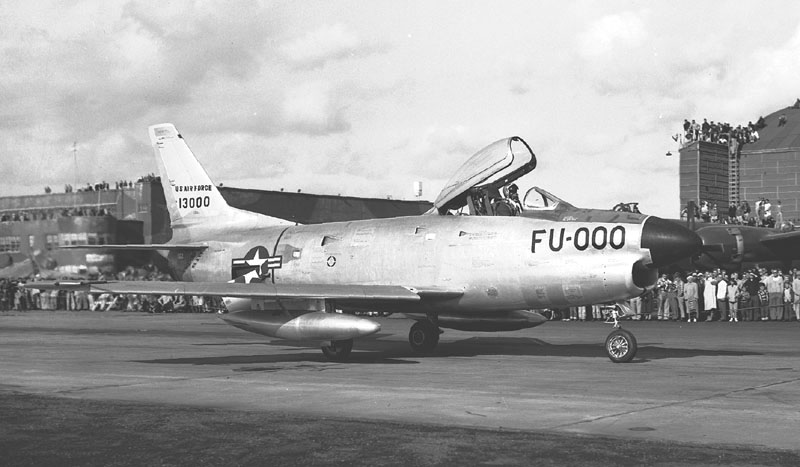
F-86D Sabre as flown by the squadron

In February 1953, the squadron became part of the 516th Air Defense Group, which was organized by Air Defense Command (ADC) as headquarters for the squadron and supporting units at McGhee Tyson. It replaced its F-47s with modern North American F-86A Sabres in July. The following June, these Sabres were replaced by F-86Ds, equipped with airborne interception radar and armed with Folding-Fin Aerial Rockets (Note: Cornett & Johnson list the squadron's equipment as the F-86D until inactivation. Cornett & Johnson, p. 129. Robertson says the squadron "Utilized all major modifications of the F-86, including the 'L' model." The F-86L was similar to the F-86D, but equipped with data link for communication with Semi Automatic Ground Environment control centers. Robertson, AFHRA Factsheet. It seems unlikely the squadron would have utilized modifications like the F-86H, which was optimized as a fighter bomber.)

In August 1955, ADC implemented Project Arrow, which was designed to bring back on the active list the fighter units which had compiled memorable records in the two world wars. As a result, the 355th Fighter Group replaced the 516th Group as the squadron's headquarters. The squadron continued to fly Sabres in actual and simulated exercises to test its alert status and combat readiness until it was inactivated, along with the 355th Group in January 1958. Further air defense activities at McGhee Tyson were handled by the newly activated 134th Fighter Group of the Air National Guard.

=== Tactical fighter operations ===
==== Initial training and deployment ====
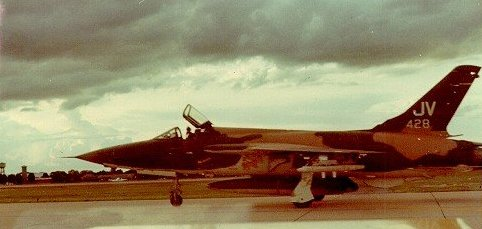
Squadron F-105D Thunderchief at Takhli RTAFB (Note: Aircraft is Republic F-105D-10-RE Thunderchief, serial 60-0428, Polyana. This plane was shot down over North Vietnam on 19 September 1968, killing the pilot. Baugher, Joe (3 October 2023). "1960 USAF Serial Numbers". Joe Baugher.)

The squadron was redesignated the 469th Tactical Fighter Squadron and activated at George Air Force Base, California in the summer of 1962, where it was assigned to the 355th Tactical Fighter Wing. The squadron was unmanned until the end of June 1963, when it began to be equipped with Republic F-105 Thunderchiefs. It became operational with the "Thud" in February 1964. (Note: Ravenstein says the squadron became operational in November 1963. Ravenstein, p. 190.) In July 1964, the 355th Wing moved to McConnell Air Force Base, Kansas, but the squadron remained at George until 30 November 1964, when it moved to Yokota Air Base, Japan to augment the 41st Air Division. It then moved to Kadena Air Base. Okinawa, where it supported the fighter operations of the 18th Tactical Fighter Wing, which included supporting combat operation in Southeast Asia.

==== Combat in Southeast Asia ====
On 8 November 1965, the squadron's temporary assignment to the Pacific became permanent, when the squadron moved to Korat Royal Thai Air Force Base, where it was assigned to Pacific Air Forces' 6234th Tactical Fighter Wing and began combat operations. On 8 April 1966, the 388th Tactical Fighter Wing replaced the 6234th at Korat. In 1968 the squadron converted from the F-105 to the McDonnell F-4 Phantom II.

===== Air Force Cross =====
On 11 August 1967, Lt. Col. Harry Schurr commanded of a strike force of twenty F-105s of the 469th. He flew through intense, accurately directed hostile fire that damaged his aircraft prior to reaching the target, but he continued to lead the strike in a devastating attack against a key railroad and highway bridge. One span was destroyed and others heavily damaged. As a result, the flow of war materials into this area was appreciably reduced. For his heroism, airmanship, and aggressiveness in the face of the hostile force, he was awarded the Air Force Cross.

===== Fast FACs =====
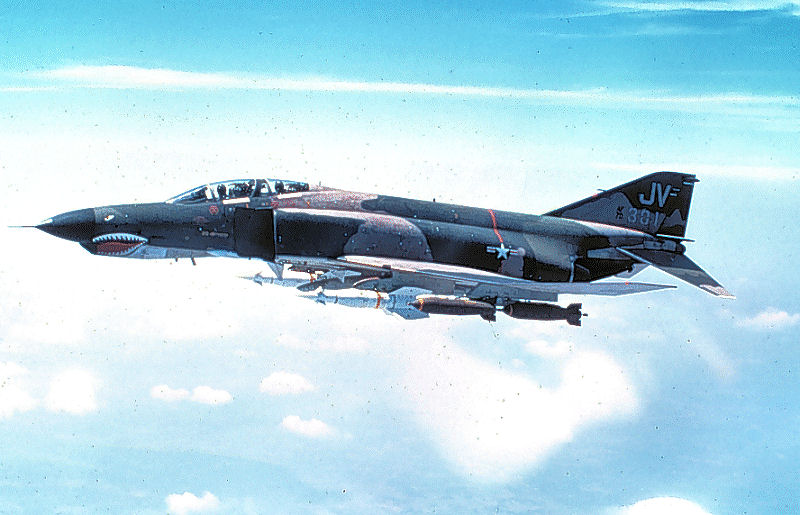
Squadron F-4E Phantom II (Note: Aircraft is McDonnell F-4E-35-MC Phantom, serial 67-0301, Honey Bucket. This plane survived the war. It was transferred to the Turkish Air Force in April 1992 and crashed into the Aegean Sea in December 1995. Baugher, Joe (18 July 2023). "1967 USAF Serial Numbers". Joe Baugher.)

By January 1969, proliferating antiaircraft defenses in the Barrel Roll area in Laos were making operations ever riskier for slow forward air controllers (FACs) such as the Raven FACs. Volunteers from the squadron were approved for fast FAC duty under the call sign "Tiger" in February. The inertial guidance systems in their fresh F-4E Phantom IIs were important for piloting and target location in an environment largely lacking in navigation aids, especially after the March loss of the only TACAN site in northern Laos. On 17 March, the volunteer FACs began supplying the necessary tactical air power for General Vang Pao's Hmong guerrillas to sweep through Operation Raindance. In April, the "Tigers" were considered for night FAC duties, but rejected. By July, the "Tiger" FACs were so immersed in directing close air support, they were allotted four sorties per day. Between July and September 1969, the "Tigers" were credited with 34 enemy killed by air, 12 antiaircraft sites destroyed, 246 interdictory road cuts of enemy supply lines, 15 enemy supply trucks destroyed, 403 structures destroyed, 360 fires caused by explosions, and 681 secondary explosions of munitions and fuel. They accomplished this during 182 FAC missions, during which they directed 2,004 air strikes. In turn, the "Tigers" suffered five F-4E's severely damaged by enemy fire.

The squadron continued combat operations, for which it received two Presidential Unit Citations until inactivating on 31 October 1972. While inactive, it was consolidated with the 469th Bombardment Squadron in September 1985, retaining its designation as tactical fighter squadron.

=== Pilot training ===
Member nations of NATO combined pilot training programs to reduce costs and increase standardization. The US offered to host Euro NATO Joint Jet Pilot Training (ENJJPT) at Sheppard Air Force Base, Texas. Participating nations contribute to the ENJJPT program proportionately to their use. The 469th Flying Training Squadron was reactivated in April 2009 as part of the 80th Flying Training Wing to conduct undergraduate flying training for ENJJPT pilot candidates.

In April 2009, the consolidated squadron, redesignated the 469th Flying Training Squadron, was activated. Its personnel represent 13 NATO nations and it supports the ENJJPT with Northrop T-38 Talon aircraft. It flys over 11,500 training sorties and 13,000 hours while training over 200 student pilots and instructor trainees annually.

== Lineage ==
469th Bombardment Squadron

- Constituted as the 469th Bombardment Squadron on 1 July 1942

Activated 15 July 1942
Inactivated 1 April 1944

- Consolidated with the 469th Tactical Fighter Squadron as the 469th Tactical Fighter Squadron on 19 September 1985

469th Flying Training Squadron

- Constituted as the 469th Fighter-Interceptor Squadron on 10 October 1952

Activated on 1 December 1952
Inactivated 8 January 1958

- Redesignated 469th Tactical Fighter Squadron and activated on 13 April 1962 (not organized)

Organized on 8 July 1962
Inactivated 31 October 1972

- Consolidated with the 469th Bombardment Squadron on 19 September 1985
- Redesignated 469th Flying Training Squadron on 25 February 2009
- Activated on 10 April 2009

=== Assignments ===
- 333d Bombardment Group, 15 July 1942 – 1 April 1944
- 35th Air Division, 1 December 1952
- 516th Air Defense Group, 16 February 1953
- 355th Fighter Group, 18 August 1955 – 8 January 1958
- Tactical Air Command, 13 April 1962 (not organized)
- 355th Tactical Fighter Wing, 8 July 1962 – 8 November 1965 (attached to 41st Air Division, 30 November 1964, 18th Tactical Fighter Wing, unknown – 8 November 1965 for operations)
- 6234th Tactical Fighter Wing, 8 November 1965
- 388th Tactical Fighter Wing, 8 April 1966 – 31 October 1972
- 80th Operations Group, 20 April 2009 – present

=== Stations ===
- Topeka Army Air Field, Kansas, 15 July 1942
- Dalhart Army Air Field, Texas, 22 February 1943 – 1 April 1944
- McGhee Tyson Airport, Tennessee, 13 April 1952 – 8 January 1958
- George Air Force Base, California, 13 April 1962
- McConnell Air Force Base, Kansas, 21 July 1964 – October 1965
- Korat Royal Thai Air Force Base, Thailand, 8 November 1965 – 31 October 1972
- Sheppard Air Force Base, Texas, 10 April 2009 – present

=== Aircraft ===
- Consolidated B-24 Liberator, 1942–1944
- Republic F-47 Thunderbolt, 1952
- North American F-86A Sabre, 1953–1954
- North American F-86D Sabre, 1954–1958
- Republic F-105 Thunderchief, 1963–1968
- McDonnell F-4 Phantom II, 1968–1972
- Northrop T-38C Talon, 2009–present

=== Awards and campaigns ===
Award streamer	Award	Dates	Notes
	Presidential Unit Citation	9 November 1965-8 April 1966	469th Tactical Fighter Squadron
	Presidential Unit Citation	10 March-1 May 1967	469th Tactical Fighter Squadron
	Air Force Outstanding Unit Award with Combat "V" Device	29-30 Jun 1966	469th Tactical Fighter Squadron
	Air Force Outstanding Unit Award with Combat "V" Device	1 July 1966-30 June 1967	469th Tactical Fighter Squadron
	Air Force Outstanding Unit Award with Combat "V" Device	1 July 1967-30 June 1968	469th Tactical Fighter Squadron
	Air Force Outstanding Unit Award with Combat "V" Device	1 July 1968-15 September 1969	469th Tactical Fighter Squadron
	Air Force Outstanding Unit Award with Combat "V" Device	10 October 1970-20 May 1971	469th Tactical Fighter Squadron
	Air Force Outstanding Unit Award	1 July 1956-30 June 1957	469th Fighter-Interceptor Squadron
	Air Force Outstanding Unit Award	1 July 2010-30 June 2012	469th Flying Training Squadron
	Air Force Outstanding Unit Award	1 July 2013-30 June 2015	469th Flying Training Squadron
	Air Force Outstanding Unit Award	1 July 2017-30 June 2019	469th Flying Training Squadron
	Vietnamese Gallantry Cross with Palm	8 April 1966-31 October 1972	469th Tactical Fighter Squadron

Campaign Streamer	Campaign	Dates	Notes
	American Theater without inscription	15 July 1942–1 April 1944	469th Bombardment Squadron
	Vietnam Defensive	8 November 1965–30 January 1966	469th Tactical Fighter Squadron
	Vietnam Air	31 January 1966–28 June 1966	469th Tactical Fighter Squadron
	Vietnam Air Offensive	29 June 1966–8 March 1967	469th Tactical Fighter Squadron
	Vietnam Air Offensive, Phase II	9 March 1967–31 March 1968	469th Tactical Fighter Squadron
	Vietnam Air/Ground	22 January 1968–7 July 1968	469th Tactical Fighter Squadron
	Vietnam Air Offensive, Phase III	1 April 1968–31 October 1968	469th Tactical Fighter Squadron
	Vietnam Air Offensive, Phase IV	1 November 1968–22 February 1969	469th Tactical Fighter Squadron
	Tet 1969/Counteroffensive	23 February 1969–8 June 1969	469th Tactical Fighter Squadron
	Vietnam Summer-Fall 1969	9 June 1969–31 October 1969	469th Tactical Fighter Squadron
	Vietnam Winter-Spring 1970	3 November 1969–30 April 1970	469th Tactical Fighter Squadron
	Sanctuary Counteroffensive	1 May 1970–30 June 1970	469th Tactical Fighter Squadron
	Southwest Monsoon	1 July 1970–30 November 1970	469th Tactical Fighter Squadron
	Commando Hunt V	1 December 1970–14 May 1971	469th Tactical Fighter Squadron
	Commando Hunt VI	15 May 1971–31 July 1971	469th Tactical Fighter Squadron
	Commando Hunt VII	1 November 1971–29 March 1972	469th Tactical Fighter Squadron
	Vietnam Ceasefire Campaign	29 March 1972–31 October 1972	469th Tactical Fighter Squadron
