= I.G. Brown Air National Guard Training and Education Center =

I.G. Brown Training and Education Center
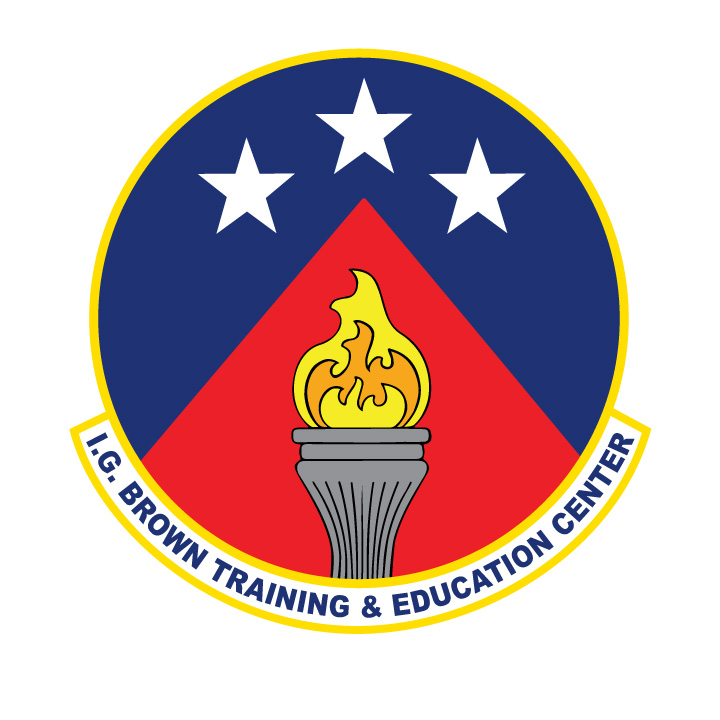
- Logo of the I.G. Brown TEC
- Active: 1968–present
- Country: United States
- Branch: United States Air Force
- Role: Air Force Education Center
- Part of: Det. 10, Air National Guard Readiness Center
- Garrison/HQ: McGhee Tyson ANGB, Tennessee
- Nickname: TEC
- Mottos: Train and educate today's Airmen for tomorrow's fight.

The I.G. Brown Training and Education Center is a detachment of the Air National Guard Readiness Center and is located at McGhee Tyson Air National Guard Base near Knoxville, Tennessee. The TEC conducts an average of 16 Enlisted Professional Military Education courses and 40 Professional Continuing Education sessions throughout the year. Typically, the TEC accommodates 11,000 service members on campus annually from the Total Force, United States Coast Guard, and partner nation armed forces. TEC also manages the ANG's Warrior Network; a $7 m satellite broadcast enterprise with more than 186 downlink sites, providing training, education and command information nationwide. In addition, the studio and multimedia facilities support ANG video productions, senior leader conferences and general-to-career field-specific training.

== Personnel and resources ==
The Training and Education Center's staff of approximately 85 people represent all components of the regular United States Air Force, Air National Guard, Air Force Reserve Command and civil service members. The campus houses an athletic center, dormitories, classrooms, auditorium and dining facility.

== Organizational structure ==
The Training and Education Center includes three divisions at McGhee Tyson Air National Guard Base. The Chief Master Sergeant Paul H. Lankford Enlisted Professional Military Education Center for EPME delivers both Airman Leadership School and Noncommissioned Officer Academy programs of instruction. Lankford Center, conducting an average of 16 EPME courses annually, is one of the Air Force's top producers of EPME students, graduating nearly 2,000 total Air Force students per-year. The in-resident programs deliver EPME in about five-six weeks. Lankford EPME Center is accredited with the Community College of the Air Force through the USAF Barnes Center for Enlisted Education. The Instructional Development, Production, and Transmission Branches work as one division toward four lines of effort: Leadership Academy (train the trainers, leadership schools, instructor certification); Building the Blue (learning management systems, 3-5-7-level upgrade training); From the Force (just-in-time training, 15 minute crowd source videos, enhancing/encouraging innovation); Innovation in Education (educator’s think tank, designing learning for the future, developing training technologies). TEC-U manages the ANG’s broadcast television studios and the Warrior Network. Instructional Development is accredited with the Community College of the Air Force, listed as the I.G. Brown School.

== History ==
The I.G. Brown Training and Education Center (TEC) started on 10 July 1967 as a pilot project to determine the feasibility of an Air National Guard Non Commissioned Officer (NCO) Academy at McGhee Tyson Air National Guard Base in Knoxville, Tennessee. On 24 June 1968, the Air National Guard NCO Academy officially began operations as a permanent training institution. In April 1970, the ANG NCO Leadership School was added to ANG NCO Academy. In recognition of the academy’s expanded role, the school adopted the name "ANG Academy."

In April 1971, an Officers Preparatory Academy was added to serve as a commissioning source for Air National Guard officers. On 12 April 1971, the first class at the ANG Officers Preparatory Academy began with 29 students. In 1973, the ANG Officers Preparatory Academy was renamed the Academy of Military Science.

On 30 June 1978, the ANG Academy was officially named the Air National Guard I. G. Brown Professional Military Education Center in honor of Major General I. G. Brown, an Arkansas Air Guardsman and former Director of the Air National Guard (August 1962 to April 1974) who was instrumental in founding the Academic center. On 1 October 1982, the I. G. Brown Professional Military Education Center became a direct reporting unit of the Air National Guard Support Center and was designated as Detachment 10, I.G. Brown PMEC.

On 1 January 1998, I.G. Brown Air National Guard Professional Military Education Center was redesignated the I.G. Brown Air National Guard Training and Education Center (TEC) to reflect the Academy’s broader and expanding mission. In July 2008, the Air National Guard Noncommissioned Officer Academy and the Airman Leadership School was memorialized as Chief Master Sergeant Paul KH. Lankford School of Enlisted Professional Military Education (EPME) in honor of the first enlisted commandant of the Air National Guard Noncommissioned Officer Academy and Leadership School. On 1 May 2012, the I.G. Brown Air National Guard Training and Education Center was renamed the I.G. Brown Training and Education Center.

Commanders:

- Col. Edmund C. Morrisey, 15 Jul 1968 – 21 Jul 1983;
- Lt. Col. Herbert D. Wright, 22 July 1983 – 9 Jul 1986;
- Col. Larry W. Martin, 10 Jul 1986 – 31 May 1991;
- Col. Gregory J. Maciolek, 1 Jun 1991 – 12 Jul 1995;
- Col. David L. Scobey, 13 Jul 1995 – 11 Feb 1999;
- Col. Richard W. Burris, 12 Feb 1999 – 12 Aug 2002;
- Col. Barbara A. Eager, 13 Aug 2002 – 31 May 2006;
- Col. Michael L. Waggett, 31 May 2006 – 1designated9;
- Col. Richard B. Howard, 13 Mar 2009 – 14 Jan 2011;
- Col. Bradley N. McRee, 14 Jan 2011 – 15 Jul 2011;
- Col. Timothy J. Cathcart, 15 Jul 2011 – 22 May 2014;
- Col. Jessica Meyeraan, 23 May 2014 – 29 April 2016;
- Col. Kevin Donovan, 29 April 2016 – 1 June 2017;
- Col. Kerry R. Lovely, 1 June 2017 – 31 May 2019;
- Col. Kenneth Lozano, 31 May 2019 – Feb 2021.

EPME Commandants:

- Major Edmund Morrisey, Jul – Nov 1968;
- CMSgt. Paul H. Lankford, Nov 1968 – Nov 1981;
- CMSgt. George A. Vitzthum, Nov 1981 – Sep 1985;
- CMSgt. Gordon G. Kniskern, Sep 1985 – 1988;
- CMSgt. Richard A. Moon, 1988 – Oct 1990;
- CMSgt. Jayne E. Shorey, Oct 1990 – Aug 1993;
- CMSgt. Samuel P. Neale, Sep 1993 – Feb 1997;
- CMSgt. Walter F. Souder, Feb 1997 – Nov 1999;
- CMSgt. Jenny L. Smith, Nov 1999 – Apr 2000;
- CMSgt. Arthur H. Hafner III, Apr 2000 – 2003;
- CMSgt. Joseph E. Thornell Sr., 2003 – Feb 2007;
- CMSgt. Deborah F. Davidson, Feb 2007 – Jan 2011;
- CMSgt. Donald E. Felch, Jan 2011 – Nov 2013;
- CMSgt. Thomas K. Stoudt, Nov 2013 – Jan 2015;
- SMSgt. P. Christine Shawhan (Interim), Jan – May 2015;
- CMSgt. Edward L. Walden Sr., May 2015 – July 2017;
- CMSgt Winfield S. Hinkley Jr., July 2017 – June 2018;
- SMSgt Ann R. Stokes (Interim), June 2018 – November 2018;
- CMSgt Steven A. Durrance, November 2018 – present.

Air Force Outstanding Excellence Awards (AFOEA): 1 Jul 72 – 30 Jun 74;1 Jul 74 – 31 Dec 78; 1 Oct 86 – 30 Sep 88; 1 Oct 88 – 31 Jan 91; 1 Feb 91 – 31 Jan 93; 1 Jun 95 – 31 May 97; 1 Oct 07 – 30 Sep 09; 1 Oct 10 – 30 Sep 11; 1 Oct 11 – 30 Sep 13
