= 516th Air Defense Group =

Disbanded USAF organization

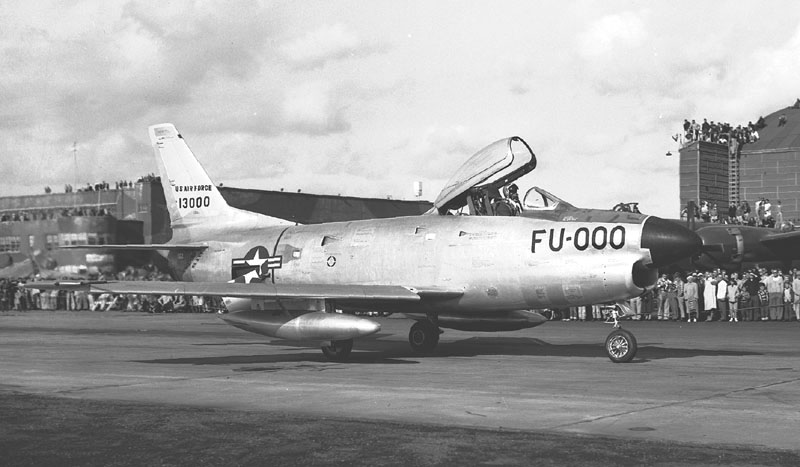
- North American F-86D Sabre as flown by the 516th Air Defense Group
- Active: 1945; 1953–1955
- Country: United States
- Branch: United States Air Force
- Role: Air defense
- Mottos: Up and at 'Em

Insignia
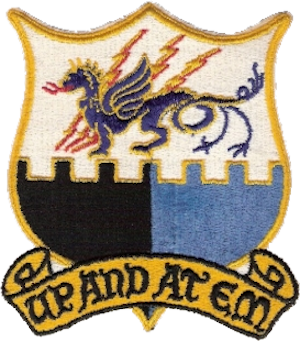
- Patch showing the 516th Air Defense Group Emblem

The 516th Air Defense Group is a disbanded United States Air Force organization. Its last assignment was with the 35th Air Division at McGhee Tyson Airport, Tennessee. It was inactivated on 18 August 1955.

The group was originally activated as a support unit for the 460th Bombardment Group at the end of World War II in Italy and then redeployed to the Caribbean, where it supported units redeploying from the European Theater until it was inactivated in 1945.

The group was activated once again in 1953, when ADC established it as the headquarters for a dispersed fighter-interceptor squadron and the medical, maintenance, and administrative squadrons supporting it. It was replaced in 1955 when ADC transferred its mission, equipment, and personnel to the 355th Fighter Group in a project that replaced air defense groups commanding fighter squadrons with fighter groups with distinguished records during World War II.

== History ==
=== World War II ===
The group was first activated shortly before the end of World War II as the 516th Air Service Group in Italy in early 1945 as part of a reorganization of Army Air Forces (AAF) support groups in which the AAF replaced Service Groups that included personnel from other branches of the Army and supported two combat groups with Air Service Groups including only Air Corps units. The unit was designed to support a single combat group. Its 942d Air Engineering Squadron provided maintenance that was beyond the capability of the combat group, its 766th Air Materiel Squadron handled all supply matters, and its Headquarters & Base Services Squadron provided other support. Supported the 460th Bombardment Group in Italy, then moved to Trinidad and supported flying units redeploying from Europe to the United States until the group was inactivated in the Caribbean. It was disbanded in 1948.

=== Cold War ===
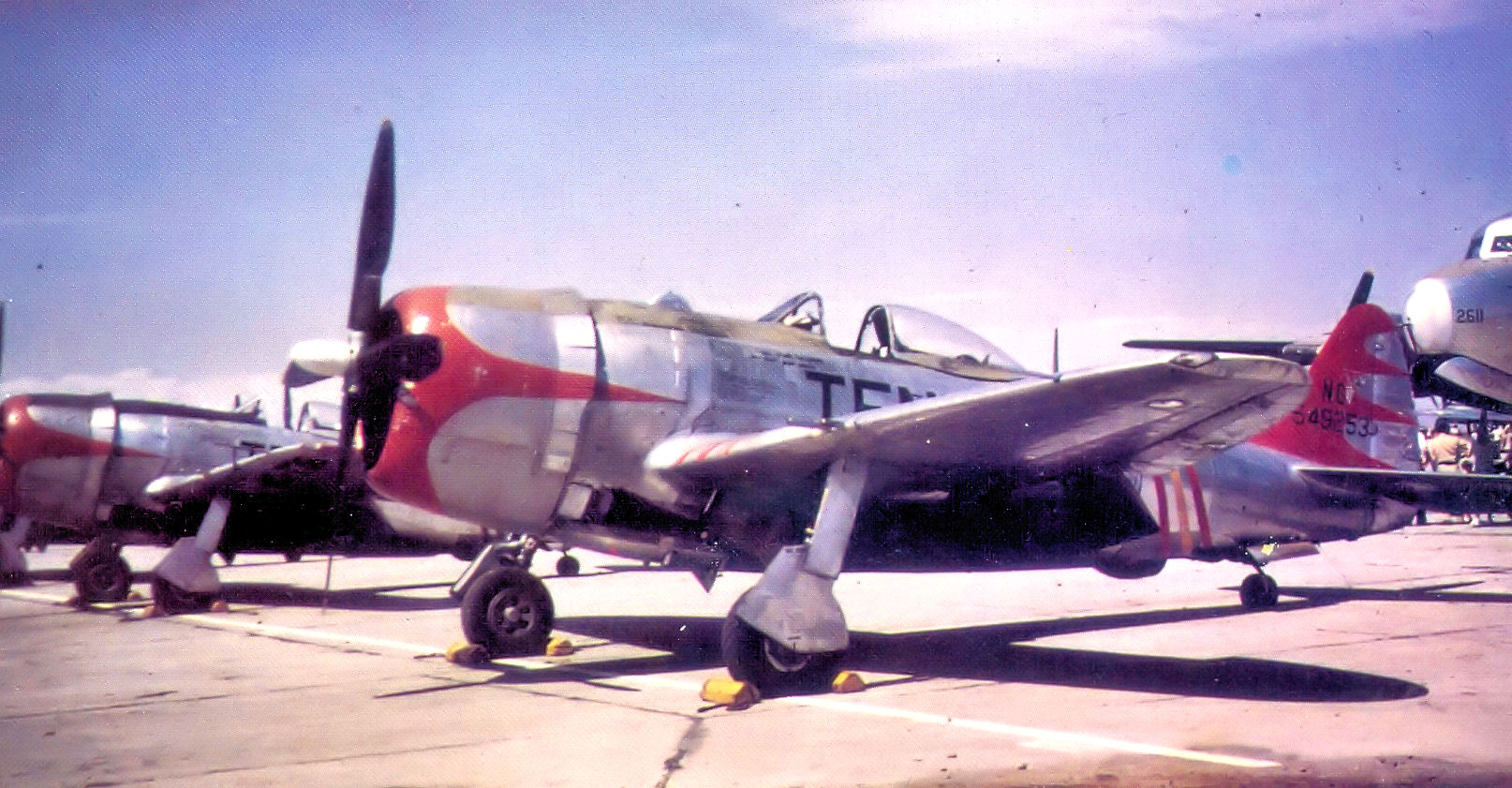
105th Fighter Squadron F-47N (Note: When the 105th FIS was returned to the control of the Air National Guard on 1 December 1952, its F-47s were transferred to the 469th FIS, which continued to fly them until equipping with F-86s.)

During the Cold War, the group was reconstituted, redesignated as the 516th Air Defense Group, and activated at McGhee Tyson Airport in February 1953 with responsibility for air defense of Oak Ridge National Laboratory, Alcoa Aluminum Facilities. The group was assigned the 469th Fighter-Interceptor Squadron, which was already stationed at McGhee-Tyson Airport, flying World War II era Republic F-47 Thunderbolts as its operational component. The 469th had been assigned directly to the 35th Air Division. The group replaced the 74th Air Base Squadron as USAF host organization at McGhee Tyson Airport. It was assigned three squadrons to perform its support responsibilities.

The 469th Squadron replaced its Thunderbolts with North American F-86 Sabre jet aircraft in July 1953 In March 1954, the 469th was joined by the 460th Fighter-Interceptor Squadron, flying Mighty Mouse rocket armed and airborne intercept radar equipped Sabres. The group was inactivated and replaced by the 355th Fighter Group (Air Defense) in 1955 as part of ADC's Project Arrow, which was designed to bring back on the active list the fighter units which had compiled memorable records in the two world wars. The group was disbanded again in 1984.

== Lineage ==
- Constituted as 516th Air Service Group

Activated on 25 Jan 1945
Inactivated on 26 Sep 1945
Disbanded on 8 Oct 1948

- Reconstituted and redesignated 516th Air Defense Group on 21 Jan 1953

Activated on 16 Feb 1953
Inactivated on 18 August 1955
Disbanded on 27 Sep 1984

=== Assignments ===
- Unknown, 25 Jan 1945 – 1945 (probably XV Air Force Service Command)
- Caribbean Division, Air Transport Command, 1945 – 26 Sep 1945
- 35th Air Division, 1 January 1952 – 18 August 1955

=== Stations ===
- Spinazzola Airfield, Italy 26 Jan 1945 – ca. March 1945
- Garagnone, Italy, ca. March 1945 – ca June 1945
- Waller Field, Trinidad ca. June 1945 – 26 Sep 1945
- McGhee Tyson Airport, Tennessee, 16 Feb 1953 – 18 August 1955

=== Components ===
Operational Squadrons

- 460th Fighter-Interceptor Squadron, 18 March 1954 – 18 August 1955
- 469th Fighter-Interceptor Squadron, 16 Feb 1953 – 18 August 1955

Support Units

- 516th Air Base Squadron, 16 Feb 1953 – 18 August 1955
- 516th Materiel Squadron, 16 Feb 1953 – 18 August 1955
- 516th Medical Squadron (later 516th USAF Infirmary), 16 Feb 1953 – 18 August 1955
- 766th Air Materiel Squadron, 26 Jan 1945 – 26 Sep 1945
- 942d Air Engineering Squadron, 26 Jan 1945 – 26 Sep 1945

=== Aircraft ===
- Republic F-47D Thunderbolt, 1953
- Republic F-47N Thunderbolt, 1953
- North American F-86A Sabre, 1953–1954
- North American F-86D Sabre, 1954–1955

=== Commanders ===
- Lt Col. Robert L. Wehr, 25 January 1945 – March 1945
- Lt Col. D. Ross Ellis, March 1945 – 1945
- Unknown 16 February 1953 – 18 August 1955

== See also ==
- List of United States Air Force Aerospace Defense Command Interceptor Squadrons
- List of F-86 Sabre units
