= McGhee Tyson Air National Guard Base =

Airport

- Knoxville, Tennessee in the United States of America
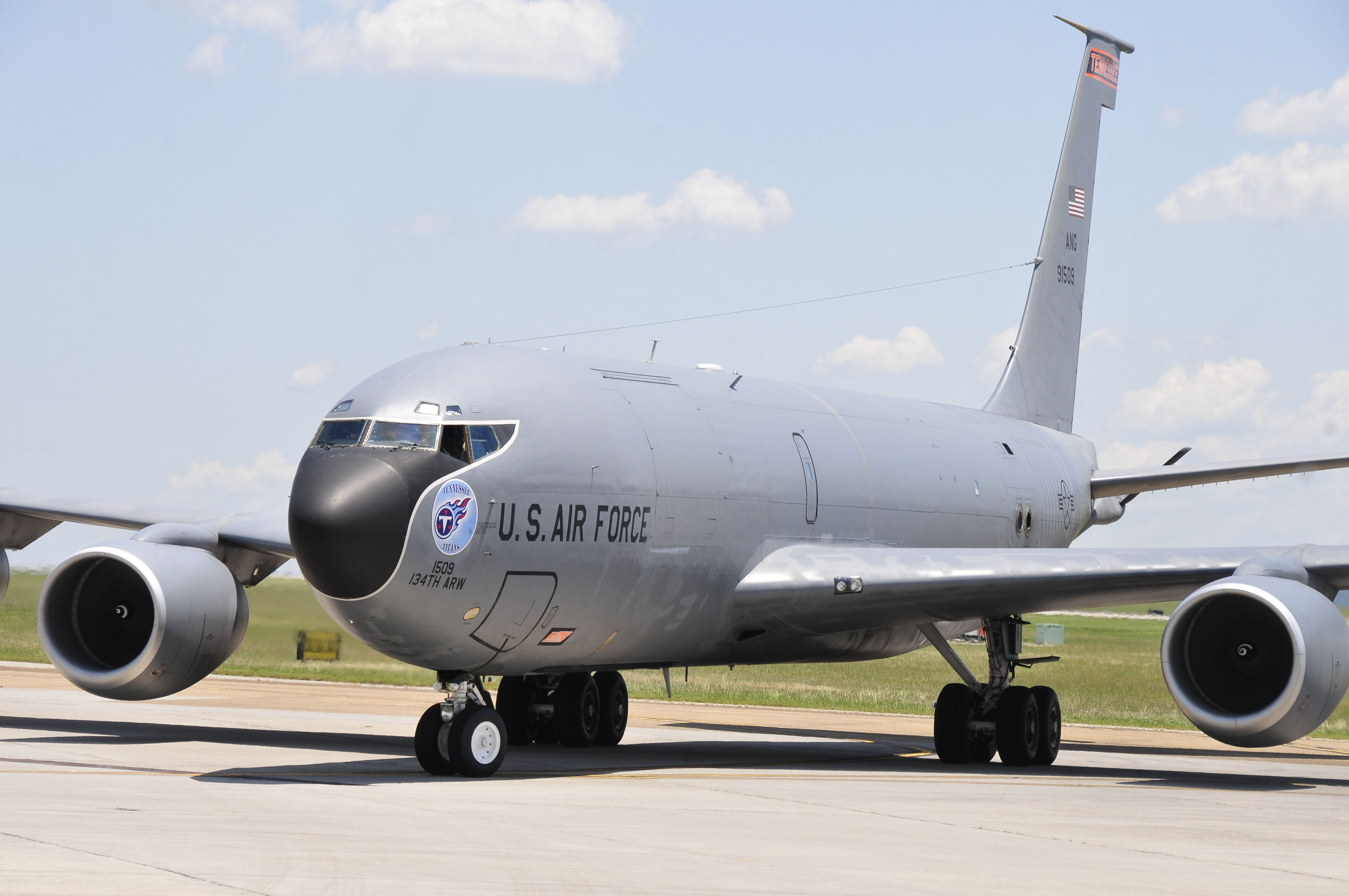
- A KC-135R Stratotanker of the 134th Air Refueling Wing taxies on the ramp at McGhee Tyson ANGB.

Site information
- Type: Air National Guard Base
- Owner: Department of Defense
- Operator: US Air Force (USAF)
- Controlled by: Tennessee Air National Guard
- Condition: Operational
- Website: www.134arw.ang.af.mil

Location
- Location in the United States
- Coordinates: 35°48′39″N 083°59′38″W

Site history
- Built: 1952
- In use: 1952 – present

Garrison information
- Garrison: 134th Air Refueling Wing

Airfield information
- Identifiers: IATA: TYS, ICAO: KTYS, FAA LID: TYS, WMO: 723260
- Elevation: 298.3 metres (979 ft) AMSL
Runways
Direction	Length and surface
5R/23L	2,743.2 metres (9,000 ft) Asphalt
5L/23R	3,048.0 metres (10,000 ft) Concrete
- Shared with: McGhee Tyson Airport

McGhee Tyson Air National Guard Base (IATA: TYS, ICAO: KTYS, FAA LID: TYS) is a joint military facility located at McGhee Tyson Airport. It is located approximately 10 miles (16 km) south of the central business district of Knoxville, near Alcoa, Tennessee. It was the site of McGhee Tyson Air Force Base from 1952 until 1960.

== Overview ==
McGhee Tyson ANGB is the home of the 134th Air Refueling Wing (134 ARW) of the Tennessee Air National Guard, an Air Mobility Command (AMC) gained unit which functions as the host wing for the installation. Other tenants of the base include the 119th Command and Control Squadron, the I.G. Brown Air National Guard Training and Education Center, the Air National Guard Band of the South, and the 1st Squadron, 230th Armored Cavalry Regiment's Army Aviation Support Facility of the Tennessee Army National Guard, operating several Sikorsky UH-60 Blackhawk helicopters.

== History ==
The announcement that the United States Air Force (USAF) would build an air base at McGhee-Tyson Airport was made on January 26, 1951. Fighter-interceptors based there would defend the Atomic Energy Commission facilities at nearby Oak Ridge National Laboratory, the Alcoa aluminum plant and the rest of the Tennessee Valley, including the vital Tennessee Valley Authority dams. Initial construction was estimated at $5.5 million. The military facilities built on the northwest side of the airfield have remained separate from the civilian airport.

The base officially opened on August 9, 1952, as McGhee Tyson Air Force Base, but air defense alert operations began there much sooner. The federalized Tennessee Air National Guard Detachment 1, 105th Fighter Interceptor Squadron, was assigned to the base while on active duty during the Korean War. Assigned to Air Defense Command (ADC) and flying F-47D Thunderbolts, the 105th FIS was headquartered at Berry Field in Nashville. The 105th FIS remained at the base until 1 January 1952 when it was returned to state control under the Tennessee Air National Guard

The Air Defense Command's active duty Central Air Defense Force, 516th Air Defense Group (516 ADG), replaced the Air National Guard unit on 1 January 1952. With it were the 516th Air Base Squadron, 516th Materiel Squadron, and the 516th Infirmary. Between 1200 and 1400 airmen, with a then-$1.5 million annual payroll, were assigned to the base.

The tactical unit of the 516 ADG was the 469th Fighter-Interceptor Squadron (469 FIS), which initially inherited the World War II-vintage F-47s (formerly P-47 Thunderbolts) of the Air National Guard, later replacing them with F-86D Sabre jet fighters. In 1953, the 460th Fighter-Interceptor Squadron became a second F-86D squadron at the base. The 460th was reassigned to Portland Airport, Oregon, in 1955, while the 469th remained at TYS until 1957 when it was inactivated.

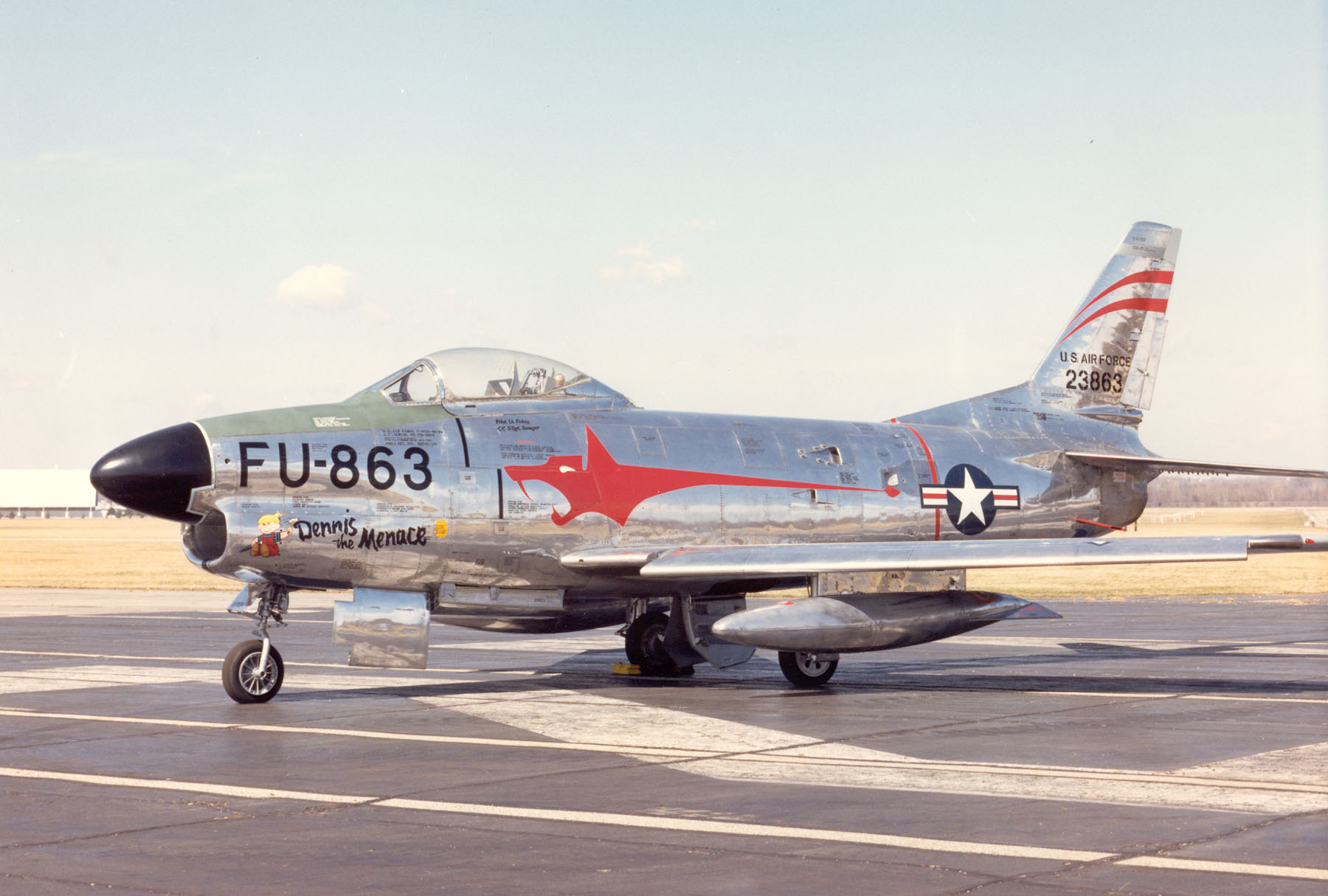
North American F-86D Sabre at the National Museum of the United States Air Force. This type of interceptor aircraft was assigned to McGhee Tyson AFB during the 1950s.

The 516th Air Defense Group was redesignated as the 355th Fighter Group (Air Defense) on 18 August 1955. The 354 FIS was activated with F-86Ds to become the second FIS.

On August 29, 1957, the Air Force announced that the base, by then worth $7.75 million in then-current dollars, would close. About 4,000 active duty Air Force personnel left the area, taking with them $25.5 million in equipment from the base. Regular Air Force operations at McGhee Tyson Airport ended on January 8, 1958, and the 354 FIS was inactivated on that date. The 355 FIS remained until 1 July 1960 when it was inactivated along with the F-86 interceptor squadrons, and the base turned over to Tennessee Air National Guard control and renamed McGhee Tyson Air National Guard Base.

With the departure of Regular Air Force units, the Tennessee Air National Guard continued to maintain a fighter-interceptor mission at McGhee Tyson under the 134th Fighter-Interceptor Group (134 FIG) with F-86D aircraft until 1960 when the 134 FIG transitioned to the F-104A Starfighter. In April 1964, the 134th would retire its F-104s and convert to an air refueling mission as the 134th Air Refueling Group (134 ARG) with KC-97G Stratofreighter aircraft, operationally gained by Tactical Air Command (TAC). With the retirement of its KC-97s in 1976, the 134 ARG would convert to the KC-135A Stratotanker that year and become operationally gained by the Strategic Air Command (SAC), later transitioning to the KC-135E in 1982. With the inactivation of SAC in 1992, the 134 ARG was briefly claimed by the newly established Air Combat Command (ACC) before having its operational claimancy shifted to the recently created Air Mobility Command (AMC) in 1993. In 1995, the 134 ARG was redesignated as the 134th Air Refueling Wing (134 ARW), its current designation, and in 2006 the wing transitioned to the KC-135R that it flies and maintains today.

The 134 ARW, which continues to be operationally gained by AMC, operates the KC-135R Stratotanker for both air mobility missions and the aerial refueling of military aircraft.

McGhee Tyson ANGB is also home to the I.G. Brown Air National Guard Training and Education Center and its associated Academy of Military Science (AMS). Similar to USAF Officer Training School (OTS), AMS was an alternate commissioning source for prospective USAF officers, primarily former enlisted airmen of the Air Force Reserve and Air National Guard who were directly inputted into various units of the Air Force Reserve Command and the Air National Guard throughout the United States. The AMS program was merged into the OTS organization at Maxwell AFB, Alabama in 2010. Today, the center, also known as the TEC, is a detachment of the Air National Guard Readiness Center at Joint Base Andrews, Maryland. The TEC conducts an average of 16 Enlisted Professional Military Education courses and 40 Professional Continuing Education sessions throughout the year. Typically, the TEC accommodates 4,000 service members on campus annually from the Regular and Air Reserve Components (ARC) of the U.S. Air Force, the U.S. Coast Guard, and partner nation armed forces. In addition, the studio and multimedia facilities support ANG video productions, senior leader conferences and general-to-career field specific training.

== See also ==
- Aerospace Defense Command Fighter Squadrons
