= 134th Air Refueling Wing =

134th Air Refueling Wing

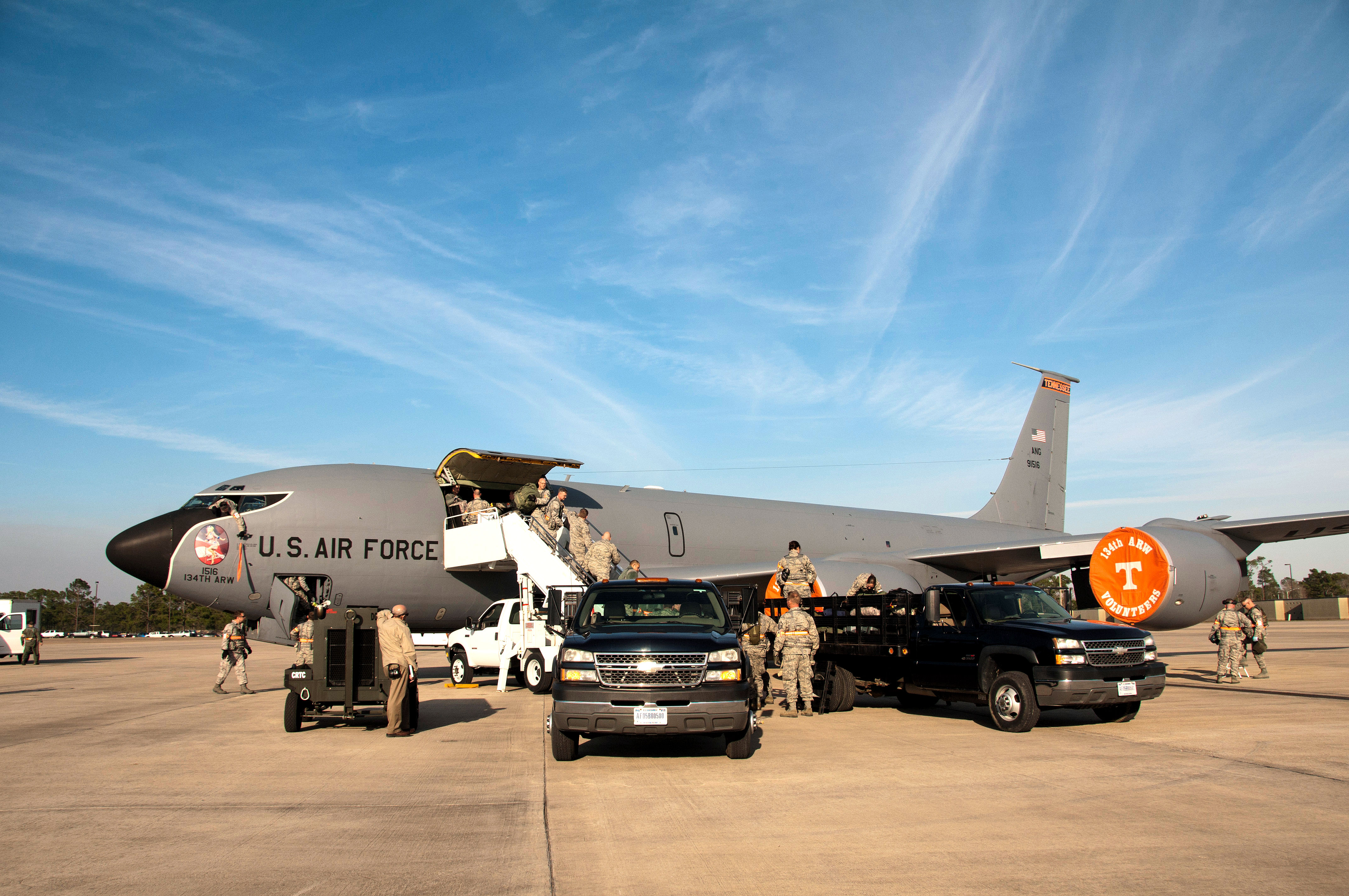
- 151st Air Refueling Squadron Boeing KC-135R-BN Stratotanker 59-1516
- Active: 15 December 1957-Present
- Country: United States
- Allegiance: Tennessee
- Branch: Air National Guard
- Type: Wing
- Role: Aerial refueling
- Part of: Tennessee Air National Guard
- Garrison/HQ: McGhee Tyson Air National Guard Base, Knoxville, Tennessee
- Motto: Volunteer Ready
- Decorations: Air Force Outstanding Unit Award

Insignia
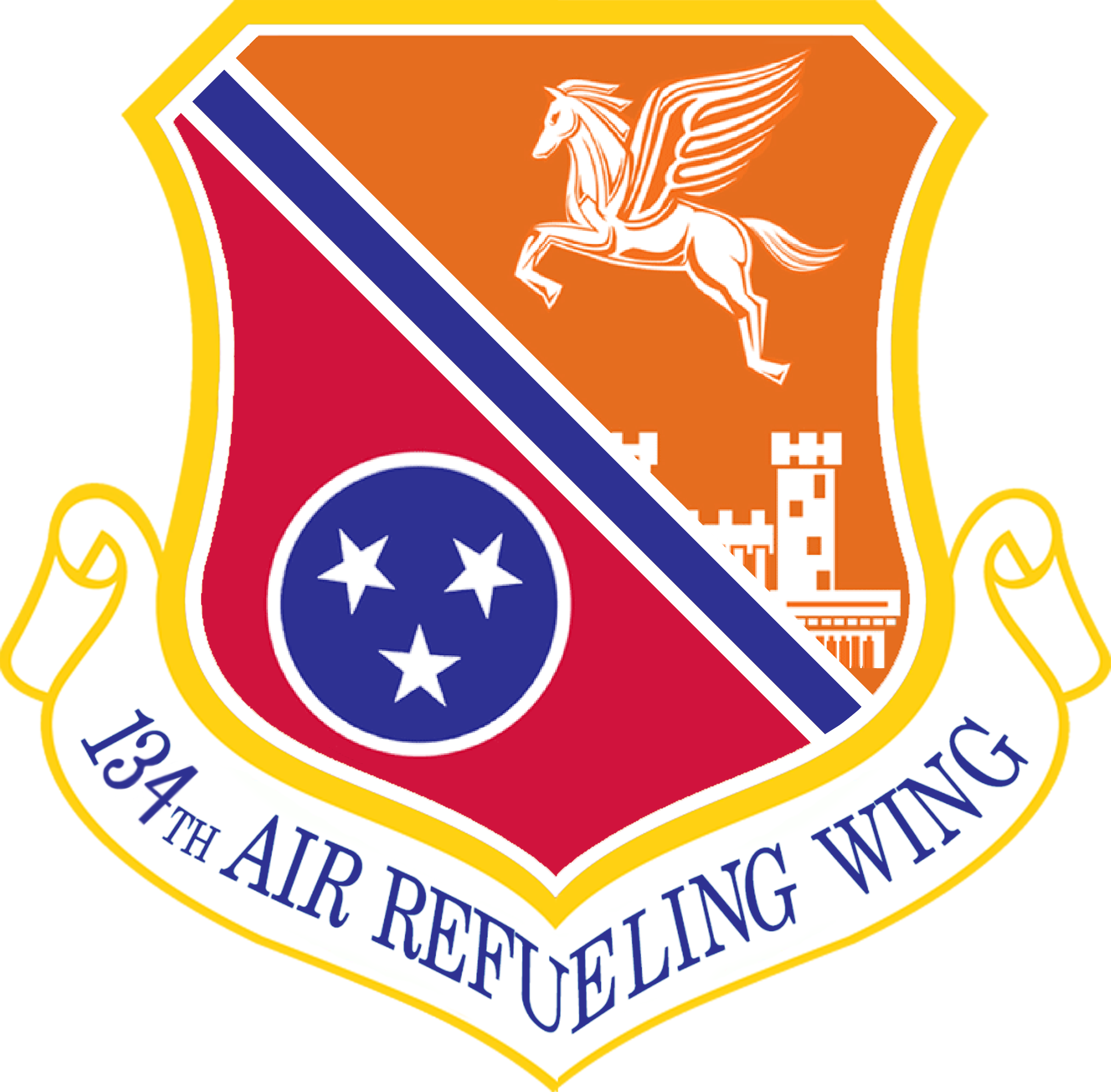
- 134th Air Refueling Wing emblem
- Tail stripe: Black, "Tennessee" in orange letters

The 134th Air Refueling Wing is a unit of the Tennessee Air National Guard, stationed at McGhee Tyson Air National Guard Base, Knoxville, Tennessee. If activated for federal service, the Wing is gained by the United States Air Force Air Mobility Command. The 134th Air Refueling Wing's KC-135 mission is to provide air refueling and airlift, as directed by the Secretary of Defense. It has been stationed at McGhee Tyson Airport since December 1957, though the ANG facility at the airport has been redesignated several times. Their radio callsign is "Soda".

== Mission ==
The winging's function is to provide aerial refueling for the United States Air Force and the Air National Guard. It also provides aerial refueling support to Air Force, Navy, Marine Corps, and allied nation aircraft. The KC-135 is capable of transporting casualties using patient support pallets during aeromedical evacuations.

== Units ==
The 134th Air Refueling Wing consists of the following units:

- 134th Operations Group

151st Air Refueling Squadron

- 134th Maintenance Group
- 134th Mission Support Group
- 134th Medical Group
- 228th Cyber Operations Group

== History ==
Authorized by the National Guard Bureau in 1957 to replace the active-duty 355th Fighter Group (Air Defense) at McGhee Tyson Air Force Base, Knoxville, Tennessee. Extended recognition as a new unit on 15 December 1957 and assigned to the Air Defense Command Montgomery Air Defense Sector.

=== Air Defense ===
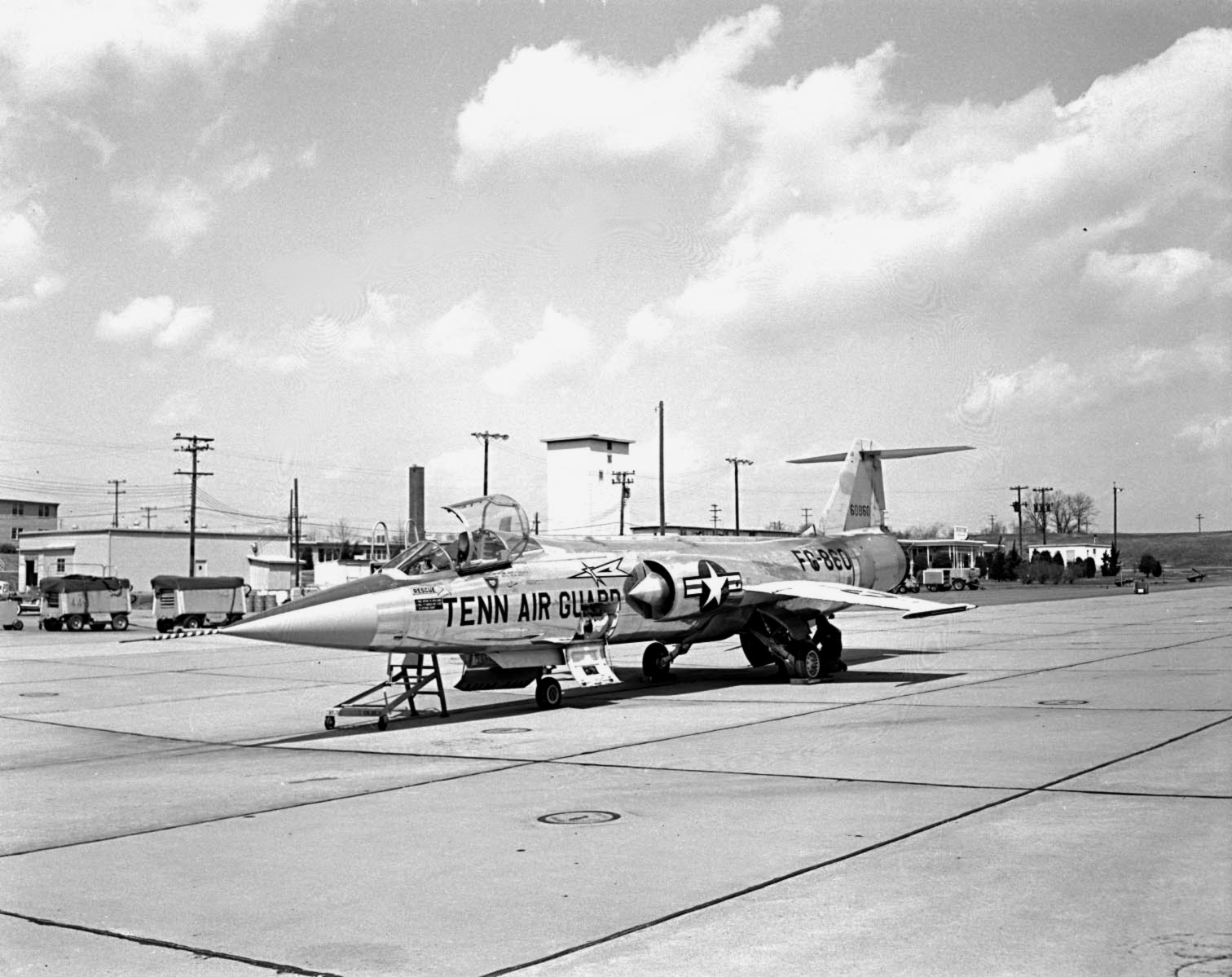
An F-104A in the early 1960s.

The third Tennessee Air National Guard unit was equipped with F-86D Sabre Interceptors with a mission of air defense over the Oak Ridge National Laboratory and the strategic Alcoa aluminum manufacturing facilities in the area. The active-duty Air Force 469th FIS was inactivated on 8 January 1958, with the 151st taking over the ADC daytime readiness alert mission in October, a status that was estimated to take two years. The F-86Ds were replaced by supersonic F-104A Starfighter interceptors in 1960.

The 151st Fighter-Interceptor Squadron was federalized in November 1961 as a result of the 1961 Berlin Crisis, deployed to Ramstein Air Base, West Germany, and assigned to the USAFE 86th Air Division. In May 1962 while still deployed to Ramstein AB, the unit set an All-Time US Air Force jet fighter flying record of 836 hours 5 minutes. In addition, the unit had the highest flying time per aircraft assigned ever recorded in the Air Force for a jet fighter in any one month to that date. Following the defusing of the Berlin crisis, the 151st was returned to Knoxville in August 1962 and reverted to Tennessee state control.

=== Air Refueling ===
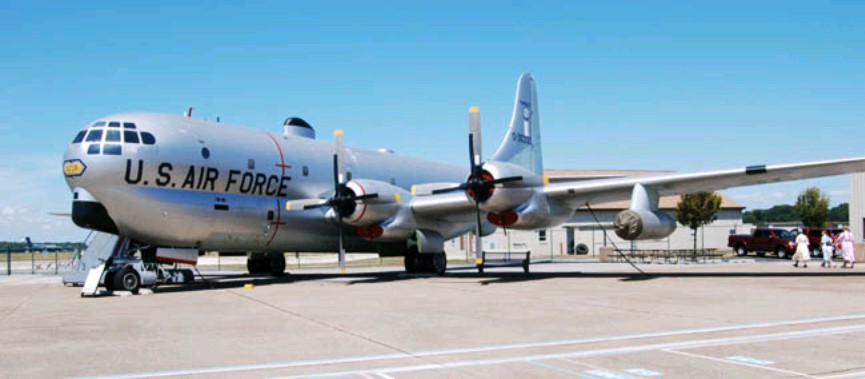
A 134th ARW KC-97L preserved at the Air Mobility Command Museum.

In April 1964 the F-104s were transferred to active ADC squadrons, the 319th and 331st FIS at Homestead AFB, Florida as part of the 32d Air Division. With the transfer of the interceptors, the 134th was transferred from Air Defense Command to Tactical Air Command and was equipped with the Boeing KC-97G Stratotanker, and assumed an air refueling mission. With no previously qualified aircrew or maintenance personnel assigned, the 134th was still the first Air National Guard flying unit equipped with KC-97's to achieve operational status. They did so in eight months, the previous "normal" time for the conversion was two years. In 1966 the squadron began a rotational deployment to Ramstein Air Base in support of Operation Creek Party which provided USAFE an air refueling capability. The Creek Party deployment rotations lasted until 1976, and over the decade the 151st saw millions of pounds of jet fuel off-loaded and millions of miles flown, all accident free.

In July 1976 the KC-97s were retired and the parent 134th was transferred to Strategic Air Command, receiving jet KC-135A Stratotankers. Once again the 134th achieved combat operational status in record time. These aircraft were later upgraded to "E" models in 1982 and finally replaced with "R" models in 2006.

The unit flew 177 sorties and off-loaded 4.5 million pounds of fuel in Operation Desert Shield. During Operation Desert Storm, one hundred and nine members of the unit were activated and deployed to Jeddah, Saudi Arabia and Dubai, United Arab Emirates. There the unit was part of the 1713th Air Refueling Wing, Provisional, commanded by Colonel Frederick H. Forster of the 134th ARW. During Operation Desert Storm, the 1713th ARW(P) flew 568 sorties and off loaded millions of pounds of fuel to combat and support aircraft.

With the inactivation of Strategic Air Command in 1992, the 134th became operationally-gained by the newly established Air Mobility Command (AMC). 60 personnel and three planes from the Air National Guard's 134th Air Refueling Wing based in Knoxville were sent overseas to support the NATO's Operation "Allied Force" in Kosovo in April 1999.

The 134th ARW transitioned to the KC-135E Stratotanker and following the recommendation of the 2005 Base Realignment and Closure Commission action, transitioned to and currently operates the KC-135R Stratotanker aircraft in worldwide support of the U. S. Air Force. The unit provides aerial refueling to all types of U.S. Air Force bomber, fighter, airlift and support aircraft, plus many NATO aircraft, as well as other air mobility support as directed by AMC.

In recent years they have been deployed to Iraq, Kuwait and Afghanistan in support of military operations associated with Operation Iraqi Freedom and the War in Afghanistan. In addition to these operations, members of the 134th are commonly deployed to locations such as Egypt, Germany, South Korea and Curaçao.

=== Lineage ===
- Established as the 134th Fighter Group (Air Defense) and allotted to Tennessee ANG in 1957

Activated and extended federal recognition and activated on 15 December 1957
Redesignated 134th Air Refueling Group, Medium on 1 April 1964
Redesignated 134th Air Refueling Group, Heavy on 1 November 1976
Redesignated 134th Air Refueling Group on 16 March 1992
Redesignated 134th Air Refueling Wing on 1 October 1995

=== Assignments ===
- Tennessee Air National Guard, 15 December 1957 – Present

Gained by: Montgomery Air Defense Sector, Air Defense Command
Gained by: Tactical Air Command, 1 April 1964
Gained by: Strategic Air Command, 1 July 1976
Gained by: Air Combat Command, 1 June 1992
Gained by: Air Mobility Command, 1 June 1993-present

=== Components ===
- 134th Operations Group, 1 October 1995 – present
- 151st Fighter-Interceptor Squadron (later 151st Air Refueling Squadron), 15 December 1957 – 1 October 1995

=== Aircraft ===
- F-86D Sabre Interceptor, 1957-1960
- F-104A Starfighter, 1960-1964
- KC-97G Stratotanker, 1964-1976
- KC-135A Stratotanker, 1976-1982
- KC-135E Stratotanker, 1982-2006
- KC-135R Stratotanker, 2006–Present
- KC-46 Pegasus, 8 planned from 2031

=== Decorations ===
- Air Force Outstanding Unit Award
