= Tennessee Air National Guard =

- Tennessee Air National Guard emblem
- Active: 4 December 1921 - present
- Country: United States
- Allegiance: Tennessee
- Branch: Air National Guard
- Type: State militia, military reserve force
- Role: "To meet state and federal mission responsibilities."
- Part of: Tennessee Military Department; United States National Guard Bureau
- Tennessee Air National Guard, 3041 Sidco Drive, Nashville, Tennessee, 37204: Berry Field Air National Guard Base, Nashville

Commanders
- Civilian leadership: President Donald Trump (Commander-in-Chief); Frank Kendall III (Secretary of the Air Force); Governor Bill Lee (Governor of the State of Tennessee)
- State military leadership: Major General Jeffrey H. Holmes (Adjutant General, Tennessee Military Department); Colonel Brig Gen M. Lee Hartley (Assistant Adjutant General, Air, Tennessee Military Department)

Insignia
- Tennessee Air National Guard logo

Aircraft flown
- Reconnaissance: MQ-9 Reaper
- Transport: C-17 Globemaster III
- Tanker: KC-135 Stratotanker

The Tennessee Air National Guard (TN ANG) is the aerial militia of the State of Tennessee, United States of America. It is, along with the Tennessee Army National Guard an element of the Tennessee National Guard of the larger United States National Guard Bureau and a reserve of the United States Air Force.

As state militia units, the units in the Tennessee Air National Guard are not in the normal United States Air Force chain of command. They are under the jurisdiction of the governor of Tennessee though the office of the Tennessee Adjutant General unless they are federalized by order of the president of the United States. The Tennessee Air National Guard is headquartered at Berry Field Air National Guard Base, Nashville, and its commander is currently Brigadier General M. Lee Hartley.

== Overview ==
Under the "Total Force" concept, Tennessee Air National Guard units are considered to be Air Reserve Components (ARC) of the United States Air Force (USAF). Tennessee ANG units are trained and equipped by the Air Force and are operationally gained by a major command of the USAF if federalized. In addition, the Tennessee Air National Guard forces are assigned to Air Expeditionary Forces and are subject to deployment tasking orders along with their active duty and Air Force Reserve counterparts in their assigned cycle deployment window.

Along with their federal reserve obligations, as state militia units the elements of the Tennessee ANG are subject to being activated by order of the governor to provide protection of life and property, and preserve peace, order and public safety. State missions include disaster relief in times of earthquakes, hurricanes, floods and forest fires, search and rescue, protection of vital public services, and support to civil defense.

Approximately 1,500 personnel are assigned to both HQ, Tennessee Air National Guard and to the 118 AW at Berry ANGB. Approximately 400 are full-time Active Guard and Reserve (AGR) and Air Reserve Technician (ART) personnel, augmented by approximately 1100 traditional part-time air guardsmen. Approximately 100 additional foreign military personnel are also temporarily assigned to the 118 AW at any one time for training in the C-130E or C-130H aircraft.

== Components ==
The Tennessee Air National Guard includes the following units:

- 118th Wing

Established 4 December 1921 (as: 136th Observation Squadron); currently reequipping with: MQ-9 Reaper
Stationed at: Berry Field Air National Guard Base, Nashville
Gained by: Air Combat Command

- 134th Air Refueling Wing

Established 15 December 1957; operates: KC-135R Stratotanker
Stationed at: McGhee Tyson Air National Guard Base, Knoxville
Gained by: Air Mobility Command
The 134th Air Refueling Wing in Knoxville, flying the KC-135 Stratotanker, provides the core aerial refueling capability for the United States Air Force and supports refueling operations throughout the world.

- 164th Airlift Wing

Established 3 February 1947 (as: 155th Fighter Squadron); operate C-17 Globemaster III
Stationed at: Memphis Air National Guard Base, Memphis
Gained by: Air Mobility Command
The 164th Airlift Wing in Memphis, flies the C-17 Globemaster III, a heavy logistics military transport aircraft designed to provide world-wide strategic airlift. .

Support Unit Functions and Capabilities:

- I.G. Brown Air National Guard Training and Education Center

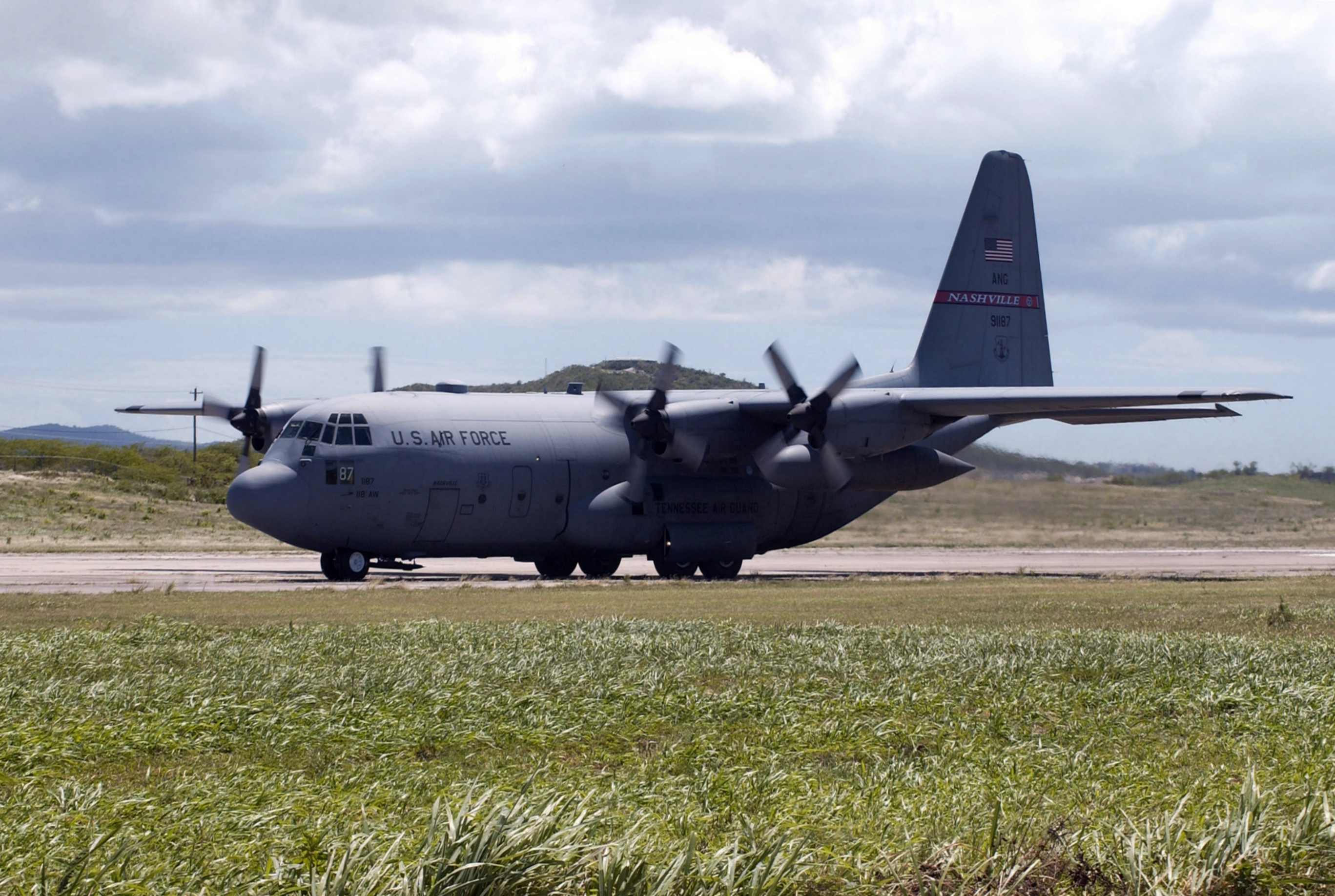
C-130H Hercules of the 105th Airlift Squadron in 2002.

Established in 1968 as the I.G. Brown Professional Military Education Center.
Stationed at McGhee Tyson Airport (tenant activity). It provided extensive leadership training for the Air National Guard. More than 4,200 students per year attend a variety of professional military education courses and skills enhancement training classes in subjects ranging from explosives safety orientation to food services, recruiting, security and expeditionary medical support.

- 119th Combat Air Control Squadron - McGhee Tyson Airport, Knoxville, Tennessee
- 228th Combat Communications Squadron - McGhee Tyson Airport, Knoxville, Tennessee
- 241st Engineering Installation Squadron -Chattanooga, Tennessee.

The 241st Engineering and Installation Squadron mobilizes small detachments of Airmen to deploy alone or with other U.S. Military units. They set up cabling that connects communications, computers, engineering, air traffic control and landing systems at installations worldwide.

== History ==
The Tennessee Air National Guard origins date to 27 August 1917 with the establishment of the 105th Aero Squadron as part of the World War I American Expeditionary Force. The 105th served in France on the Western Front, then after the 1918 Armistice with Germany was demobilized in 1919.

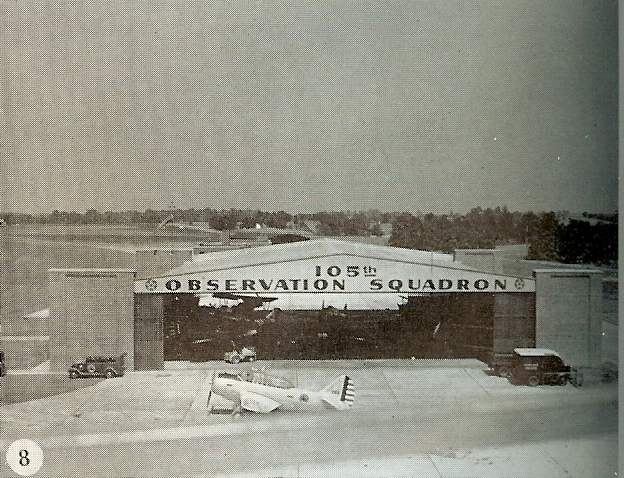
A Curtiss O-52 Owl of the 105th Airlift Observation Squadron in a hangar

The Militia Act of 1903 established the present National Guard system, units raised by the states but paid for by the Federal Government, liable for immediate state service. If federalized by Presidential order, they fall under the regular military chain of command. On 1 June 1920, the Militia Bureau issued Circular No.1 on organization of National Guard air units.

The 105th Aero was reformed on 4 December 1921, as the 105th Observation Squadron and is oldest unit of the Tennessee Air National Guard. It is one of the 29 original National Guard Observation Squadrons of the United States Army National Guard formed before World War II. The squadron was ordered into active service on 16 September 1940 as part of the buildup of the Army Air Corps prior to the United States entry into World War II.

On 24 May 1946, the United States Army Air Forces, in response to dramatic postwar military budget cuts imposed by President Harry S. Truman, allocated inactive unit designations to the National Guard Bureau for the formation of an Air Force National Guard. These unit designations were allotted and transferred to various State National Guard bureaus to provide them unit designations to re-establish them as Air National Guard units.

The modern Tennessee ANG received federal recognition on 3 February 1947 as the 105th Fighter Squadron at Berry Field, Nashville. Also, the 155th Fighter Squadron received federal recognition on 3 February 1947 at Memphis Municipal Airport. Both squadrons were equipped with F-47 Thunderbolts and were assigned to the 118th Fighter Group at Berry Field. The mission of the 118th FG was the air defense of the state. 18 September 1947, however, is considered the Tennessee Air National Guard's official birth concurrent with the establishment of the United States Air Force as a separate branch of the United States military under the National Security Act.

On 15 December 1957, the 151st Fighter-Interceptor Squadron was allotted to the Tennessee ANG and federally recognized at the McGhee Tyson Air Force Base, Knoxville.

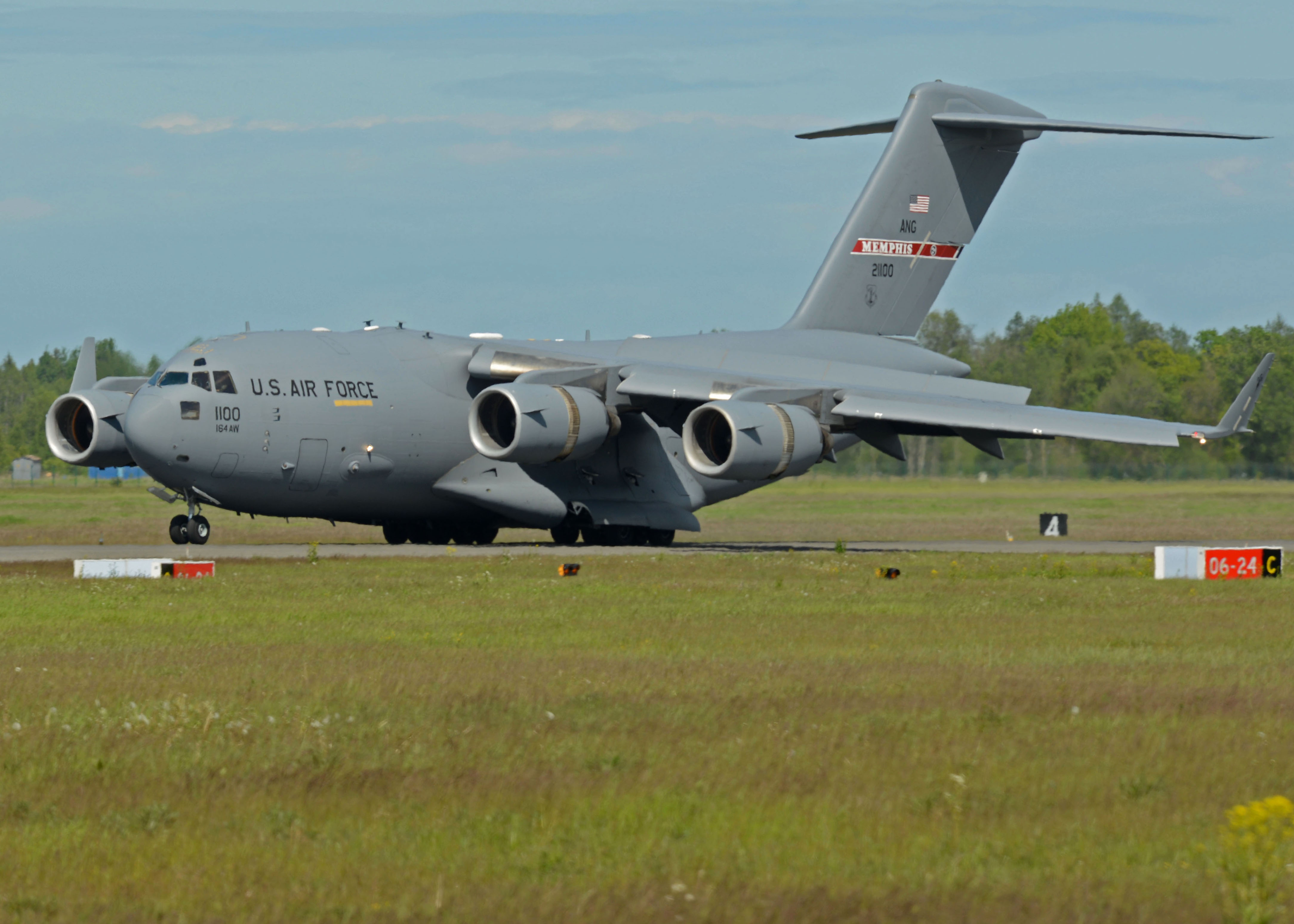
C-17 Globemaster III, assigned to the 164th Airlift Wing, lands at Ämari Air Base, Estonia, June 5, 2015.

On 1 April 1961, the Memphis-based 155th Air Transport Squadron was expanded to a Group level, and the 164th Air Transport Group was federally recognized. On 11 July 1962, the Knoxville-based 151st Fighter-Interceptor Squadron was also expanded and the 134th Fighter-Interceptor Group was federally recognized.

Today, the Nashville-based 118th Airlift Wing (118 AW) is in a transition mode to a new mission employing MQ-9 Remote Piloted Aircraft, also known as the Reaper drone. The Memphis-based 164th Airlift Wing flies the C-5 Galaxy intercontinental airlifter around the world carrying fully equipped combat-ready military units to any point in the world on short notice and then provide field support required to help sustain the fighting force. The Knoxville-based 134th Air Refueling Wing provides worldwide aerial refueling support to Air Force, Navy and Marine Corps and allied nation aircraft.

After the September 11th, 2001 terrorist attacks on the United States, elements of every Air National Guard unit in Tennessee have been activated in support of the global war on terrorism. Flight crews, aircraft maintenance personnel, communications technicians, air controllers and air security personnel were engaged in Operation Noble Eagle air defense overflights of major United States cities. Also, Tennessee ANG units have been deployed overseas as part of Operation Enduring Freedom in Afghanistan and Operation Iraqi Freedom in Iraq as well as other locations as directed.

In 2012, the 118th Airlift Wing began a transition from a C-130 Hercules airlift wing to an MQ-9 Reaper reconnaissance/surveillance wing.

== See also ==
- Tennessee State Guard
- Tennessee Wing Civil Air Patrol
