= McGhee Tyson Airport =

Airport in Alcoa, Tennessee, USA

McGhee Tyson Airport McGhee Tyson Air National Guard Base

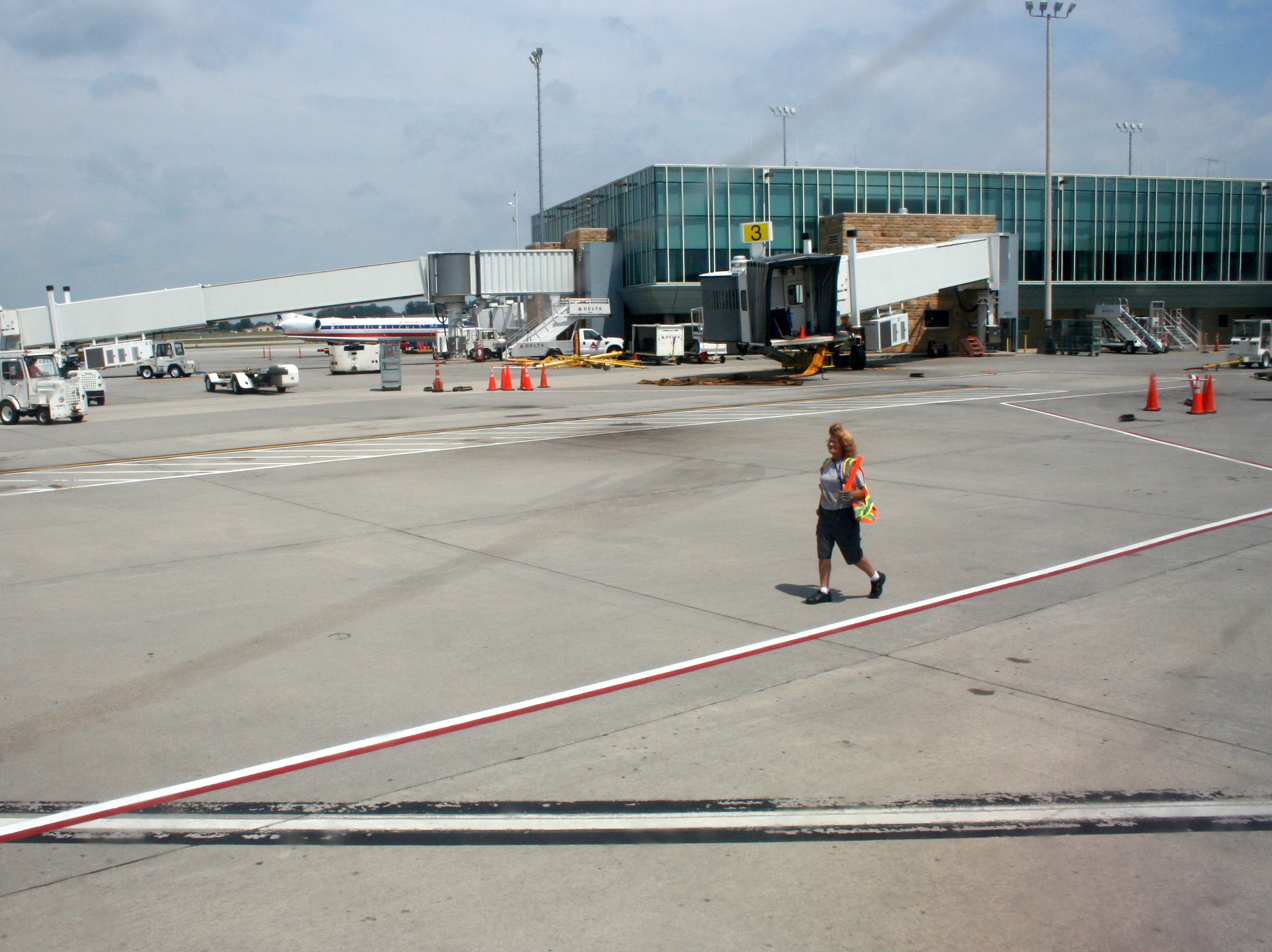
- View of terminal building
- IATA: TYS; ICAO: KTYS; FAA LID: TYS; WMO: 72326

Summary
- Airport type: Public
- Owner: Metropolitan Knoxville Airport Authority
- Serves: Knoxville, Tennessee
- Location: Alcoa, Tennessee, U.S.
- Opened: 1937
- Operating base for: Allegiant Air
- Elevation AMSL: 986 ft (301 m)
- Coordinates: 35°48′40″N 083°59′38″W
- Website: flyknoxville.com

Maps
- FAA airport diagram as of May 2023
- Interactive map of McGhee Tyson Airport

Runways
Direction	Length		Surface
Direction	ft	m	Surface
05L/23R	10,000	3,048	Asphalt
05R/23L	9,000	2,743	Asphalt

Statistics (2025)
- Passengers: 3,630,410 ▲8.70%
- Aircraft operations: 113,849
- Total freight (lbs.): 61,875,096
- Sources: McGhee Tyson Airport

McGhee Tyson Airport (IATA: TYS, ICAO: KTYS, FAA LID: TYS) is a public/military airport 12 miles (19 km) south of Knoxville, in Alcoa, Tennessee. It is named for United States Navy pilot Charles McGhee Tyson, who was killed in World War I.

Owned by the Metropolitan Knoxville Airport Authority, it is served by several major airlines and employs about 2,700 people. It is a 30-minute drive to the Great Smoky Mountains National Park. The airport is the home of McGhee Tyson Air National Guard Base, an air base for the 134th Air Refueling Wing (134 ARW) of the Tennessee Air National Guard.

== History ==
On August 1, 1930, the original McGhee Tyson airport opened, named for Charles McGhee Tyson. It was built on 60 acres (24 ha) in West Knoxville where West High School is now located. In 1935, the city purchased 351 acres (142 ha) in Blount County for the current airport. On July 29, 1937, an American Airlines Stinson Trimotor (about 10 seats) touched down, the first airline flight; before that, American's Stinsons landed at Island Airport on Dickinson Island east of town. The 1938 directory shows a 3,100-foot (940 m) N–S runway and a 4,200-foot (1,300 m) NE-SW runway at McGhee Tyson; the 1939 directory shows 4,000 feet (1,200 m) N–S and 5,000 feet (1,500 m) NE-SW. The city built a control tower in 1941.

The development of TYS helped the City of Alcoa diversify its economy and gain its economic independence from what is today Arconic Inc. (formerly Alcoa Inc.), the world's third largest producer of aluminum. Alcoa Inc. built one of its production plants in Alcoa because of the proximity of dams along the Little Tennessee River which were a hydroelectric energy source for the production of aluminum.

In 1951, the United States Air Force built several facilities on the field and 7,500-foot (2,300 m) runway 5L. The Federal Aviation Administration (FAA) added an Instrument landing system to runways 5L and 23R in 1959. In 1961, with financing by the Tennessee Air National Guard, runway 5L was extended to 9,000 feet (2,700 m). The first scheduled airline jets were Delta DC-9s in December 1965.

In 1968, McGhee Tyson built a new air cargo facility; a new passenger terminal opened in 1974, a few years after runway 18/36 closed. Four years later, the Metropolitan Knoxville Airport Authority (MKAA) was established. In 1990, runway 5R/23L was rebuilt to 9,000 feet (2,700 m). In 1992, the airport authority built a new 21-acre cargo facility on the north side of the airport for Federal Express, UPS and Airborne Express. Buildings were designed to meet the carriers' needs; 90% of the air cargo operations are UPS and Federal Express. Cost of the project was estimated at $9.3 million.

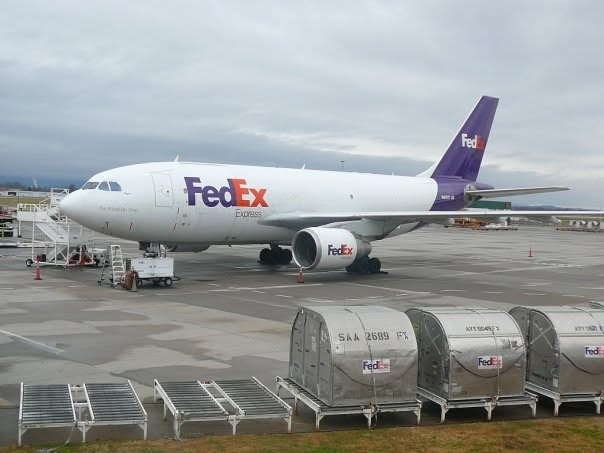
A FedEx Express A310 parked on the airport's cargo ramp

In 2000, improvements to the passenger terminal were finished at a cost of $70 million, including two new concourses, 12 new gates, ticket counters, and a Ruby Tuesday restaurant. In 2002 an aircraft maintenance facility was built for Northwest Airlines, serving as their primary CRJ MRO facility. The now-defunct ExpressJet Airlines built a heavy-maintenance hangar near the air cargo facilities for its fleet. In June 2009, a new food court was completed, featuring Starbucks, Quiznos, Cinnabon, and Zia locations. The Zia location was replaced in April 2013 with an Uno Express Pizza.

In November 2016, the agency that operates McGhee Tyson received a $27.9 million grant from the Federal Aviation Administration to complete the next phase of a multi-year runway expansion, the most expensive project the airport ever has undertaken. The north runway, 5L/23R, is being lengthened to 10,000 feet (3,000 m). During the work, 3,000 feet (910 m) of that runway were demolished while 6,000 feet (1,800 m) remained open for small planes. Airliners still land on Runway 5R/23L, which will remain 9,000 feet (2,700 m) long.

On December 17, 2021, the rebuilt 10,000-foot runway 5L/23R reopened.

In 2025, TYS Airport set an all-time record with 3,630,410 passengers traveling through the airport, an 8.7% increase over 2024.

== Facilities ==
McGhee Tyson Airport covers 2,250 acres (9.1 km^{2}) at an elevation of 986 feet (301 m). It has two parallel runways: 5L/23R is 10,000 by 150 feet (3,048 x 46 m) concrete and 5R/23L is 9,000 by 150 feet (2,743 x 46 m) asphalt.

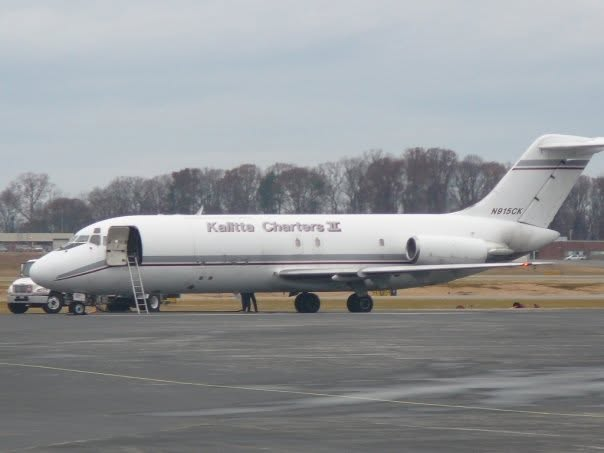
Kalitta Charters DC-9 Freighter at the TAC Air (now Signature Aviation) ramp

The fixed-base operator (FBO) at TYS is Signature Aviation, the parent company of Signature Flight Support. In July 2022 Signature Aviation announced the acquisition of the TAC Air division of TAC (Truman Arnold Companies) and the FBO was rebranded to join the Signature network.

Originally, Tac Air first moved into TYS on April 1, 2005, when it purchased Knox-Air, which had operated in TYS since 1974. Then a month later, on May 5, 2005, TAC Air purchased the only remaining FBO, Cherokee Aviation, which had been in operation since 1954. TAC Air combined these two FBOs under their own name, and they were the sole supplier of aviation fuel for commercial, corporate and general aviation aircraft as well as leased hangar space at the airport.

TYS is home to a maintenance base for Endeavor Air, crew base for Allegiant Air, and delivery, maintenance and training centers for Cirrus Aircraft.

=== Terminal ===
McGhee Tyson Airport has two levels. The top level is accessed via the curbside drop off and the parking garage. The top level has ticket counters, security, gates, restaurants and shops. It is designed with a Smoky Mountain theme, complete with faux waterfalls and wood carvings of bears. The bottom level is used for car rental counters, three baggage claims, airline offices, and airport offices.

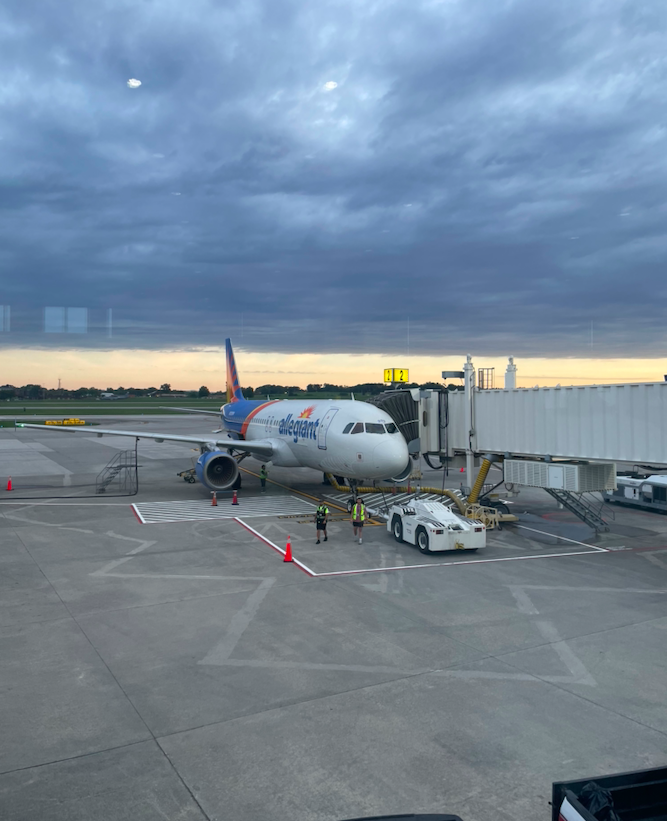
Allegiant Air Airbus A320 at Gate 2 viewed from the terminal

There are 12 gates. On a regular day Gates 2 & 4 are used by Allegiant Air, Gate 6 is a common use gate, Gates 8, 10, & 12 are used by American, Gates 1, 3 & 5 are used by Delta, and Gates 7, 9, & 11 are used by United. Gate assignments can be subject to change.

In July 2023, the airport announced the planning of a six-gate expansion to the terminal, with a target completion date of 2028, to meet the growing needs of the region.

In January 2024, airport officials announced they would be closing part of the airport's long-term parking lot to begin a project to build a new six story garage that would add 3,500 parking spots.

== Airlines and destinations ==
=== Passenger ===
General source

Airlines	Destinations	Refs
Allegiant Air	Austin, Denver, Destin/Fort Walton Beach, Fort Lauderdale, Gulf Shores, Houston–Hobby, Jacksonville (FL), Key West, Las Vegas, Newark, Orlando, Orlando/Sanford, Philadelphia, Phoenix–Sky Harbor, Punta Gorda (FL), Sarasota, St. Petersburg/Clearwater, Washington–Dulles; Seasonal: Boston, Chicago–Midway	
American Airlines	Dallas/Fort Worth; Seasonal: Charlotte, Miami	
American Eagle	Charlotte, Chicago–O'Hare, Dallas/Fort Worth, Miami, Philadelphia, Washington–National	
Avelo Airlines	Seasonal: New Haven	
Delta Air Lines	Atlanta	
Delta Connection	Atlanta, Detroit, Minneapolis/St. Paul, New York–LaGuardia	
Southwest Airlines	Baltimore, Dallas–Love, Nashville, Orlando; Seasonal: Austin, Denver, Las Vegas (begins March 13, 2027) Tampa	
Sun Country Airlines	Chicago–O'Hare (begins May 27, 2027)	
United Airlines	Chicago–O'Hare; Seasonal: Denver	
United Express	Chicago–O'Hare, Houston–Intercontinental, Newark, Washington–Dulles; Seasonal: Denver	

Passenger destinations map
Domestic destinations from McGhee Tyson Airport
Red = Year-round destination
Green = Seasonal destination
Blue = Future destination

== Statistics ==
=== Top destinations ===
Busiest domestic routes from TYS (October 2024 – September 2025)
Rank	Airport	Passengers	Airline
1	(Georgia (U.S. state)) Atlanta, Georgia	280,000	Delta
2	Dallas/Fort Worth, Texas	199,000	American
3	Charlotte, North Carolina	156,000	American
4	Chicago–O'Hare, Illinois	154,000	American, United
5	Denver, Colorado	96,000	Allegiant, Southwest, United
6	Detroit, Michigan	95,000	Delta
7	(New York (state)) New York–LaGuardia, New York	84,000	Delta
8	Fort Lauderdale, Florida	73,000	Allegiant
9	St. Petersburg, Florida	73,000	Allegiant
10	Houston–Intercontinental, Texas	67,000	United

=== Airline market share ===
Largest Airlines at TYS (December 2024 – November 2025)
Rank	Airline	Passengers	Share
1	Allegiant Air	984,000	27.71%
3	American Airlines	435,000	12.25%
2	Endeavor Air	420,000	11.83%
4	Delta Air Lines	388,000	10.91%
5	PSA Airlines	333,000	9.37%
-	Other	985,000	27.94%

=== Annual traffic ===
TYS Airport Annual Passengers and Data 2017–Present
Year	Passengers	Operations	Total Freight (lbs.)
2017	1,988,626	105,605	82,950,774(a)
2018	2,221,137	115,786	81,377,317(a)
2019	2,572,822	123,664	95,026,344
2020	1,161,447	92,406	84,151,936
2021	1,995,197	99,080	89,230,552
2022	2,495,737	102,702	79,334,045
2023	2,835,773	104,459	76,552,366
2024	3,339,757	108,402	69,762,953
2025	3,630,410	113,849	61,875,096

Note:(a) Includes mail in final 2017 and 2018 total freight data.

== Accidents and incidents ==
- On August 6, 1962, American Airlines Flight 414, a Lockheed L-188A Electra attempting to land at TYS in high winds associated with a thunderstorm veered off the right side of runway 04L and struck the raised edge of a taxiway that was under construction, causing the right hand main gear to separate. There were no fatalities and only one minor injury among the 67 passengers and 5 crew, but the aircraft was damaged beyond repair and written off.
- On March 12, 1992, a USAir Express Jetstream 31 crashed on landing after the pilot failed to lower the landing gear. There were no passengers aboard, but the two crew members were killed.
