= East Nashville Magnet High School =

East Nashville Magnet School
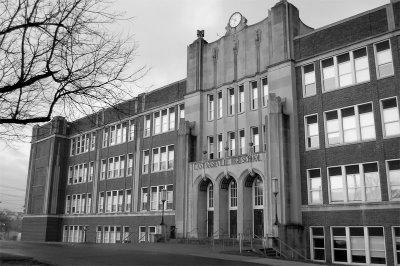

Location
- 110 Gallatin Ave; Nashville, Tennessee 37206; United States
- Coordinates: 36°10′48″N 86°45′04″W

Information
- Former name: East Literature Magnet School
- Type: Magnet high school
- Motto: Come Soar with the Eagles
- Established: 1993; 33 years ago
- School district: Metro Nashville Public Schools
- Principal: Myra Taylor
- Teaching staff: 34.99 (FTE)
- Grades: 9–12
- Enrollment: 547 (2023–2024)
- Student to teacher ratio: 15.63
- Colors: Red and gray
- Athletics: TSSAA – Class AA, District 9
- Mascot: Eagles
- Website: easthigh.mnps.org

East Nashville Magnet High School (formerly East Literature Magnet School and commonly referred to as just East) is a public magnet high school located in Nashville, Tennessee. Students were once enrolled through a lottery process, but the school now has open enrollment. In August 2016, the middle school students were relocated two miles away to what used to be Bailey STEM Magnet School before its closure. However, in August 2019, the middle school students returned to the junior high building.

== History ==
The then-East Literature Magnet School opened in August 1993 inside the campus of East Middle School. The school now occupies the entire campus of the former East Nashville High and East Nashville Junior High Schools. In September 2005, the new campus was dedicated, and the completion of renovation of buildings 'A' and 'B' were celebrated. The school now has separate middle and high school facilities. East became a Paideia curriculum school in 2010. The Paideia philosophy celebrates the fundamental notion that to be fully educated is a lifelong adventure that only begins with an individual's formal schooling. The school name was changed to East Nashville Magnet School in mid-2012.

== Academics ==
Nearly every course offered at East is an honors course, meaning that the teaching is fast-paced, and students are given three extra credit points at the end of each semester. The school also offers many AP courses, including AP Psychology, Art History, Literature and Composition, Physics, and Calculus. Because of the Paideia philosophy the school maintains, students must take part in a class seminar once a month. It ranks as a top high school in Davidson County. The school has met NCLB benchmarks every year.

== Sports ==
East Magnet offers sports such as soccer, football, basketball, wrestling, volleyball, tennis, bowling, golf, football, track and field, softball, baseball, cheerleading, and cross country. The school has enjoyed a significant amount of success in athletics during recent years. The football team was state runner's up three straight years, 2021, 2022, and 2023. The boys' basketball team won the 2A state championship in 2022 and has two state runner's up trophies from 2011 and 2014. Girls' basketball became the first East team since the school's reopening to win a state title with a championship in 2016. The girls' track team has also become one of the most successful programs in Tennessee with state championships in 2017, 2018, 2019, and 2024 along with state runner's up in 2010, 2015, 2016, 2022, and 2023.

== Principals ==
- 1997 – 1999: Tom Ward
- 1999 – 2003: Kaye Schnieder
- 2003 – 2009: Frances Stewart
- 2009 – 2018: Stephen Ball
- 2018 – 2022: Jamie Jenkins
- 2022 – present: Myra Taylor

== Notable alumni ==
- Bill Boner, 1963, the third Mayor of Metropolitan Nashville-Davidson County; U.S. Congressional Representative (5th District of Tennessee)
- Richard Fulton, 1946, second mayor of the Metropolitan Government of Nashville and Davidson County; U.S. Congressional Representative (5th District of Tennessee); Tennessee state Senator
- Sarah McKelley King; 33rd President General of the Daughters of the American Revolution
- Hugh Mott, U.S. Army soldier; captured the Bridge at Remagen, Germany; served as Adjutant General, State of Tennessee, 1968–1971; Chief of Police, Nashville, 1971–1974
- Jacob Phillips, 2017, American Football linebacker for Cleveland Browns
- Bill Porter, 1949, American audio engineer credited with helping shape the Nashville sound
- Frank Sutton, 1941, American actor best remembered for his role as Gunnery Sergeant Vince Carter on the CBS television series Gomer Pyle, U.S.M.C.
- Oprah Winfrey, 1971, American media proprietor, talk show host, actress, producer, and philanthropist
