= Hugh Mott =

American soldier

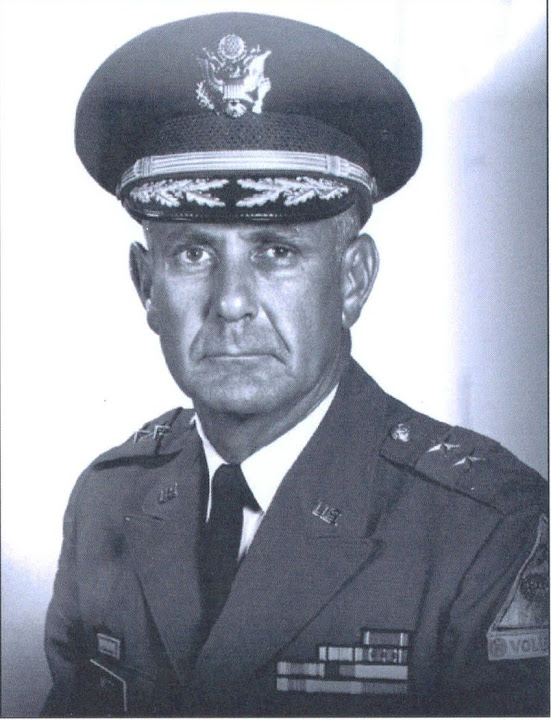
MG Hugh B. Mott '40 of the Tennessee National Guard.

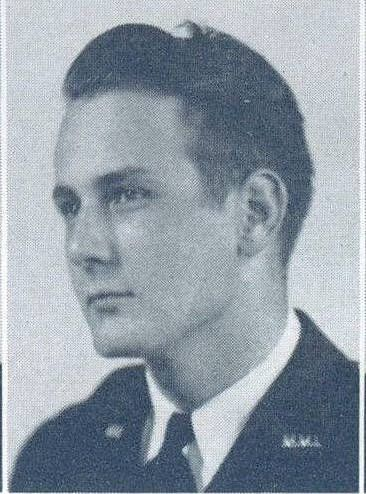
MMI Cadet Corporal Hugh B. Mott of "C" Company, second year ROTC. (Credit: 1940 MIANA, MMI Archives)

Hugh Barbee Mott (August 14, 1920 – June 24, 2005) was a soldier in the US Army. He was awarded the Distinguished Service Cross for his actions as part of the 9th Engineer Battalion in the capture of the Ludendorff Bridge on March 7, 1945.

== Early life and education ==
Mott was born in Nashville, Tennessee and graduated from East Nashville High School in 1939. He then attended the Marion Military Institute for a year in hopes of attaining an appointment to West Point. Instead, Mott worked as a civilian employee of the Army Corps of Engineers installing steel reinforcing rod for the Wolf Creek Dam from August 1940 to January 1941. He then worked 70 hours a week at the Vultee Aircraft factory in Nashville on the construction of Vengeance dive bombers until he enlisted in the Army on November 1, 1942. Mott later attended the Army Command and General Staff College and graduated from a course at the Industrial College of the Armed Forces in 1962.

== Military career ==
Mott reported for basic training at Fort Eustis in Virginia on November 30, 1942. Trained in antiaircraft artillery, he was sent to Artillery Officer Candidate School at Camp Davis in North Carolina. On June 3, 1943, Mott was commissioned as a second lieutenant of artillery. After serving as an artillery officer instructor, he transferred to the Corps of Engineers on February 10, 1944. On March 24, 1944, Mott completed engineering school at Fort Belvoir in Virginia and was assigned to the 9th Armored Division at Camp Polk in Louisiana.

== Action at Ludendorff Bridge ==
On March 7, 1945, during the allied offensive to the Rhine River, Combat Command B of the 9th Armored Division arrived at the town of Remagen, discovering that the Ludendorff Bridge over the Rhine river was intact. A three-man detachment from 2nd Platoon, B Company (Lieutenant Hugh Mott, Staff Sergeant John Reynolds, and Sergeant Eugene Dorland) moved with the first squad of A/27th AIB to reduce the remaining explosives after the first unsuccessful bridge demolition by the Germans. They were the third, fourth, and fifth US soldiers onto the bridge. Crossing with lead elements, Dorland destroyed the main demolition switch box on the far shore. The remainder of B Company, 9th Engineers followed with the rest of A/27th AIB, finding and reducing more explosives on the bridge. After the crossing was initially secured, Lt. Mott led B Company in the hasty bridge repairs that allowed the first Sherman tanks to cross the bridge by 2200 that night.

In tribute to Major General Mott, the U.S. Army Engineer School, located at Fort Leonard Wood, Missouri, named the Bachelor Officer's Quarters building "Mott Hall" in his honor.

== Later life ==
Mott remained in the military as a member of the Tennessee Army National Guard until November 1975. He attained the rank of major general, and commanded the 30th Armored Division from April 1968 to February 1969. Mott also served as the adjutant general of Tennessee from December 1968 to May 1971.

In 1971, Mott was appointed as Special Assistant for Public Safety by Nashville Mayor Beverly Briley. Mott later served briefly as the Chief of the Metropolitan Nashville Police Department.

General Mott died on June 24, 2005, at the age of 84, after spending more than 33 years in the service of his country. He was interred at the Middle Tennessee State Veterans Cemetery.
