= 194th Engineer Brigade =

- 194th Engineer Brigade Shoulder Sleeve Insignia
- Active: 1973 – Present
- Country: United States
- Branch: United States Army National Guard
- Role: Combat Engineers
- Size: Brigade
- Part of: Tennessee Army National Guard
- Website: https://www.tn.gov/military/who-we-are/army-guard/194th-engineer-brigade.html

Commanders
- Current commander: Col. Tony Glandorf
- Command Sergeant Major: CSM Michael Plemons

Insignia
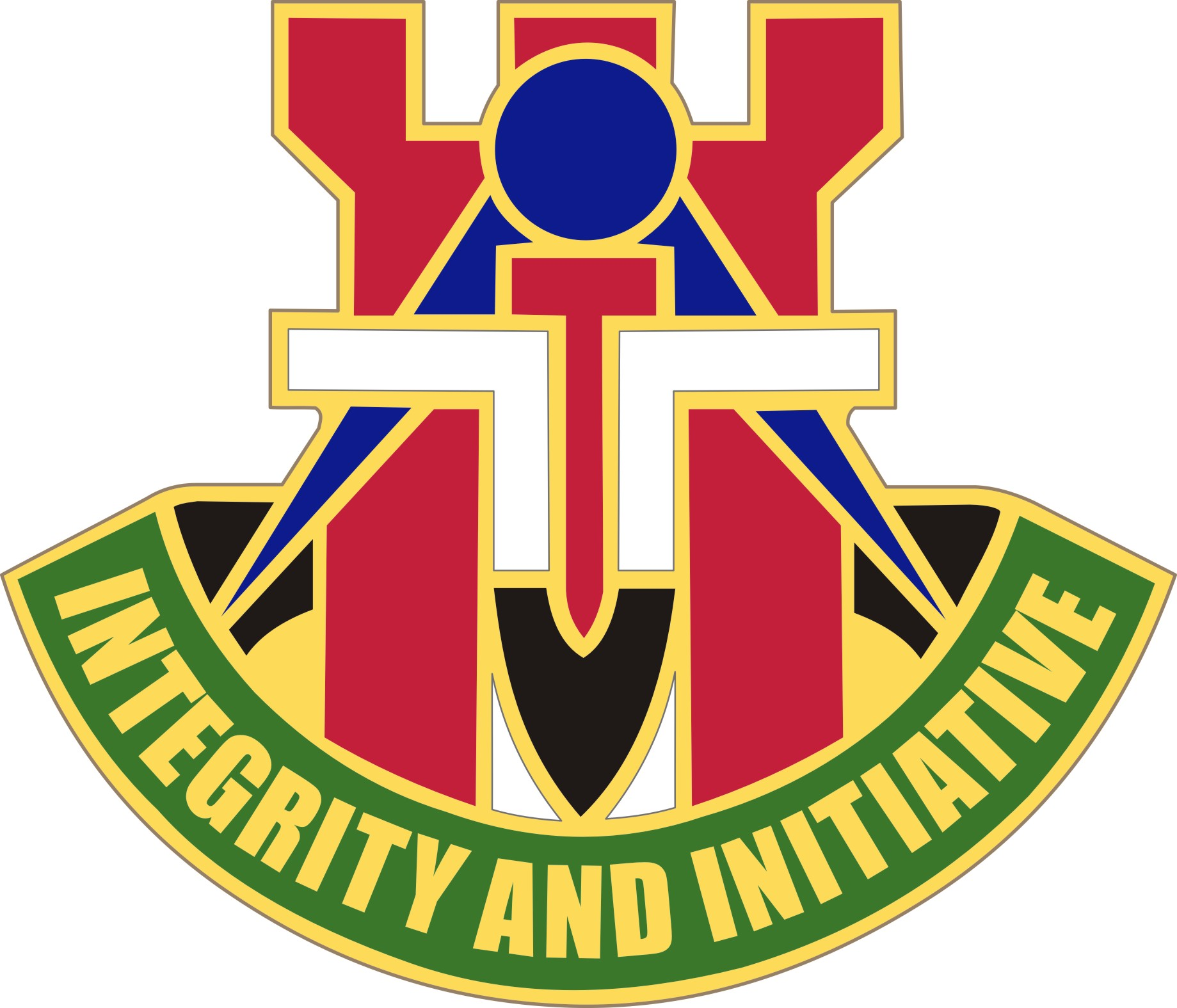
- Distinctive unit insignia

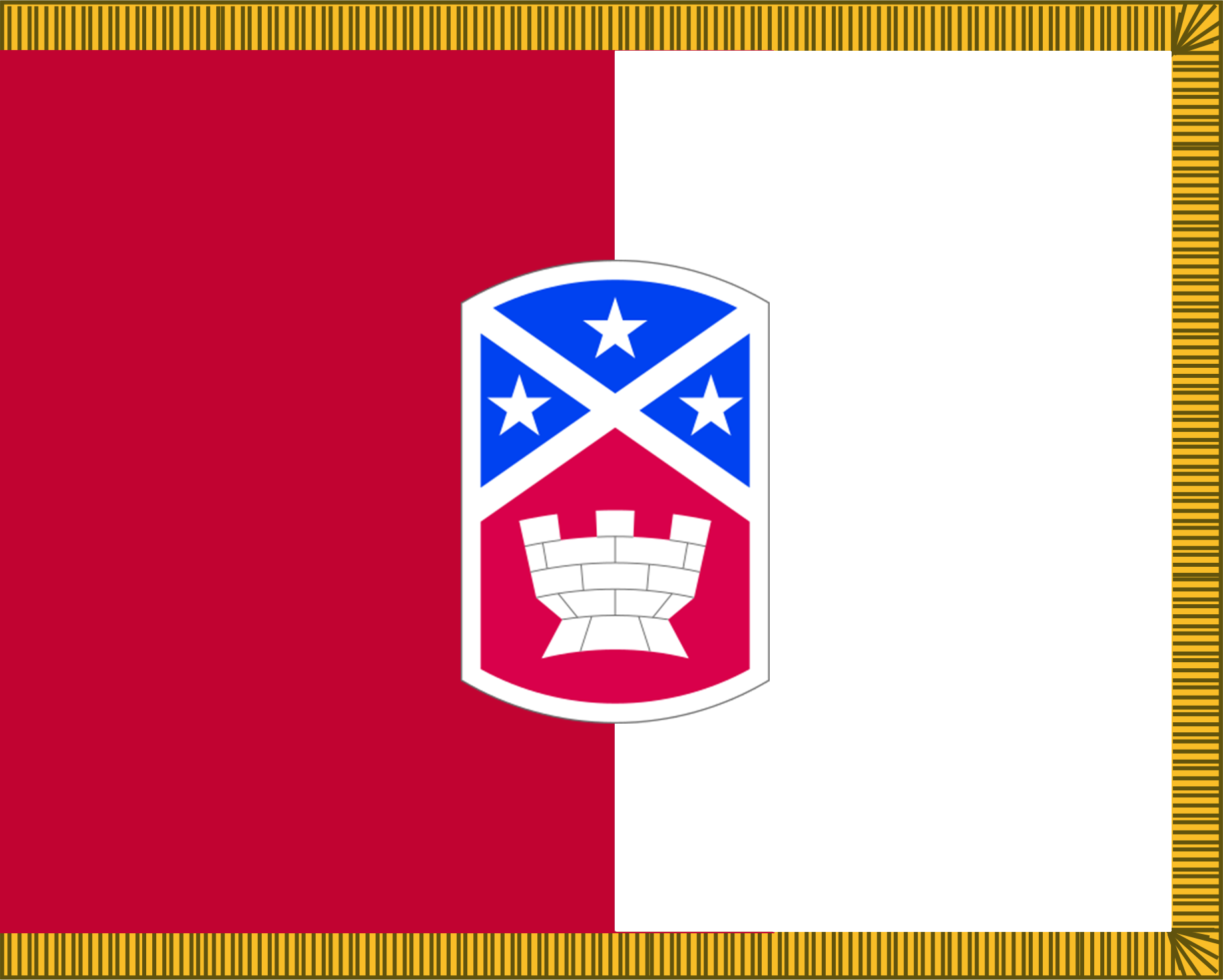
- 194th Engineer Brigade Flag

The 194th Engineer Brigade (Theater Army) is a combat engineer brigade of the United States Army based at Jackson, Tennessee. It is a part of the Tennessee Army National Guard.

The brigade has 19 units throughout Middle and West Tennessee providing engineer support not only to the military but also to Tennessee State Parks. The 194th has two battalions and 4 separate engineer companies and a well drilling detachment that fall under it during peacetime operations. As part of the Tennessee Army National Guard, the 194th Engineer Brigade serves a dual purpose. Under state command, the Brigade may be used to provide assistance and support during natural disasters or quell civil disturbances. As a result, the Brigade must train to meet both Federal and State training requirements.

== Background ==
The mission of the 194th Engineer Brigade (Theater Army) is to command assigned and attached engineer units and coordinate the engineer construction activities with the appropriate command. The peace time mission of the 194th Engineer Brigade (TA), and all assigned units, is training to attain and maintain the highest state of readiness possible, and to provide equipment and manpower in emergencies as directed by the Military Department of Tennessee.

The unit was activated as an entity of the Tennessee Army National Guard on 1 November 1973. This occurred as a result of the major reorganization of the Tennessee Army National Guard, which deactivated the 30th Armored Division. The numerical designation was derived from a former Engineer unit of the Tennessee Army National Guard, the 194th Engineer Battalion, headquartered in Centerville, Tennessee. The National Guard's unique 194th Engineer Combat Battalion was formed specifically to take advantage of Oak Ridgers' mechanical and technical know-how.

This unit was organized under MTOE 5-111GNG01 with authorized strength of 31 Officers, 4 Warrant Officers, and 86 Enlisted pursuant to GO 60, Military Department of Tennessee, dated 15 October 1973. Federal Recognition was granted by GO 13, Military Department of Tennessee, dated 1 March 1974, effective 1 November 1973. The assigned strength on date of inspection of Federal Recognition was 27 Officers, five Warrant Officers and 77 Enlisted personnel. Colonel William R. Kinton Jr. Assumed command per GO 1, Headquarters, 194th Engineer Brigade (Construction), 1 November 1973.

HHC, 194th Engineer Brigade (Corps), Nashville was reorganized under Orders 73–1, as a Theater Brigade, renaming it the 194th Engineer Brigade, with an authorized strength of 43 Officers, 5 Warrant Officers and 98 Enlisted personnel. The reorganization is under MTOE 05602LNGO1, NGO 188, 6 October 1986, effective 1 December 1987, commanded by BG Kenneth E. Wallace. On 1 January 1996, Headquarters, 194th Engineer Brigade relocated to Jackson, Tennessee.

In August 1998, detachments from Naval Mobile Construction Battalion (NMCB) 21, a reserve battalion from Lakehurst, New Jersey, helped renovate a hospital in Bulgaria. Seabees supported the exercise in two 30-person rotations. Active duty and reserve troops from the U.S. and Bulgarian Armed Forces helped renovate the dilapidated hospital, located in the city of Trun. It serves nearly 50 communities in western Bulgaria. The joint engineering exercise, Cornerstone '98, was led by the Tennessee Army National Guard's 194th Engineer Brigade. Air National Guard, active duty Seabees from NMCB-133, from Gulfport, Mississippi; NMCB-21 reserves from Delaware, New Jersey, New York and Pennsylvania; U.S. Air Force 52nd Civil Engineer Squadron specialists, from Spangdahlem Air Base, Germany; and Bulgarian Armed Forces engineering contributed their expertise. Support staff included medical personnel, a chaplain, a civil affairs group, a public affairs team and food service personnel. A base camp for the troops was set up in a former Ministry of Defense building in a nearby village. U.S. and Bulgarian troops mustered, worked, berthed and ate meals together there. The hospital was built in the early 1980s, but fell into disrepair after the end of the former communist government 20 years later. It was selected for renovation due to its compelling need for assistance, and because it provided an optimal training environment for the troops.

Some of the training highlights conducted by these peace time subordinate units during 1999 consisted of a BCST with the brigade's wartrace headquarters, 416th Engineer Command. In preparation for this exercise the brigade staff conducted the military decision-making process (MDMP) after receiving the initial OPORDER brief from the higher headquarters. The 230th Engineer Battalion and the 775th Well Drilling Detachment conducted operations at the Western Kentucky training site. The 230th conducted horizontal en ops while the 775th conducted well drilling ops. The 212th Dump Truck Company conducted haul operations at Fort Knox in support of the 155th Engineer Company. The 230th Signal Battalion attended annual training at Camp Shelby, Mississippi in support of the 196th Field Artillery Battalion. The Battalion also supported units of the 80th Troop Command by installing digital secure voice telephones (DSVT). The DSVT allowed the units to maintain voice communications while conducting a unit BCST. C Company, 46th Engineer Battalion conducted horizontal and vertical operations at Fort Campbell, Kentucky. The vertical platoon built a shoot house that was worked on during and finished during the period. The horizontal platoons built a medical gravel pad. The 913th conducted road repairs in training areas and berm repair on range 46.

The various training highlights conducted by peace time subordinate units during 2000 are as follows. The headquarters of the 194th participated in a BCST with the 416th ENCOM. the 1169th Engineer Group and the 926th Engineer Group participated as subordinate units. The 194th staff completed the MDMP for this exercise with the OPORD brief to the subordinate units in January. The 194th also participated in a warfighter exercise with V Corps in Germany. The 230th Engineer Battalion and 775th Well Drilling Detachment participated in Task Force Grizzly in California. The 230th built roads, fences and culverts along the border and the 775th conducted well drilling operations. The fence was to deter drug trafficking and the roads to expedite arrest procedures. The 212th Dump Truck Company conducted haul operations at Ft Knox in support of the 155th Engineer Company. The 230th Signal Battalion conducted METL training with its subordinate units at Ft Bragg. C co/46th En Bn – the horizontal platoons were at the Western Kentucky training site. The vertical platoons participated in a JRTC rotation with the 46th Engineer Battalion at Ft Polk, Louisiana.

In 2014, several National Incident Management System (NIMS)-certified instructors from the 1st Regiment of the Tennessee State Guard provided NIMS training to 29 members of the 194th Engineer Brigade over a two-day training period.

In 2015 a US military investigation concluded that nineteen members of the 775th Engineer Detachment (194th Engineer Brigade, Tennessee Army National Guard), had sex with prostitutes at an off-base residence in Djibouti. Sex trafficking in, and around, Camp Lemonnier, Djibouti has been a persistent problem.

== Structure ==
- 194th Engineer Brigade, in Jackson
  - Headquarters and Headquarters Company, 194th Engineer Brigade, in Jackson
  - 117th Military Police Battalion, in Athens
    - Headquarters and Headquarters Detachment, 117th Military Police Battalion, in Athens
    - 252nd Military Police Company (Combat Support), in Cleveland
      - Detachment 1, 252nd Military Police Company (Combat Support), in Oneida
    - 253rd Military Police Company (Combat Support), in Lenoir City
      - Detachment 1, 253rd Military Police Company (Combat Support), in Bristol
    - 269th Military Police Company (Combat Support), in Murfreesboro
  - 168th Military Police Battalion, in Dyersburg
    - Headquarters and Headquarters Detachment, 168th Military Police Battalion, in Dyersburg
    - 251st Military Police Company (Combat Support), in Lexington
      - Detachment 1, 251st Military Police Company (Combat Support), in Bolivar
    - 267th Military Police Company (Combat Support), in Dickson
      - Detachment 1, 267th Military Police Company (Combat Support), in Waverly
    - 268th Military Police Company (Combat Support), in Ripley
      - Detachment 1,268th Military Police Company (Combat Support), in Alamo
  - 230th Engineer Battalion, in Trenton
    - Headquarters and Headquarters Company, 230th Engineer Battalion, in Trenton
    - Forward Support Company, 230th Engineer Battalion, in Trenton
    - 190th Engineer Company (Mobility Augmentation Company), in Russellville
      - Detachment 1, 190th Engineer Company (Mobility Augmentation Company), in Jefferson City
    - 212th Engineer Company (Vertical Construction Company), in Paris
      - Detachment 1, 212th Engineer Company (Vertical Construction Company), in Camden
    - 255th Engineer Detachment (Asphalt), in Tennessee Ridge
    - 890th Engineer Company (Sapper), in Huntingdon
    - 913th Engineer Company (Engineer Construction Company), in Union City

== Unit Awards ==
- Meritorious Unit Commendation (Army), Streamer embroidered IRAQ 2004–2005
