= Tennessee–Bulgaria National Guard Partnership =

Tennessee-Bulgaria State Partnership
- Part of the U.S. European Command State Partnership Program
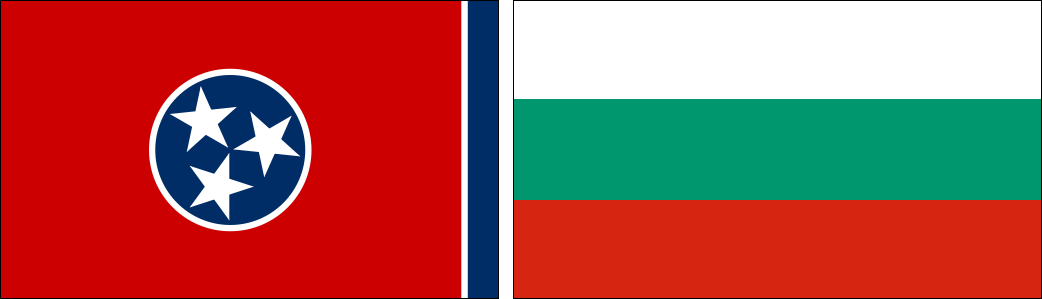
- Origin: 1993
- Country president: Rumen Radev
- Prime minister: Galab Donev
- Minister of defense: Anyu Angelov
- Ambassador to U.S.: Tihomir Stoytchev
- Ambassador to Bulgaria: Hero Mustafa
- Adjutant general: Terry M. Haston
- 1993 - 2013 Engagements: 1000+ events
- NATO member: Yes (2004)
- EU member: Yes (2007)

Bulgaria

The Tennessee–Bulgaria National Guard Partnership is one of 25 (through 2023) European partnerships that make up the U.S. European Command State Partnership Program and one of 88 (through February 2023) worldwide partnerships that make up the National Guard State Partnership Program. The Republic of Bulgaria joined by signing a bilateral affairs agreement with the U.S. Department of Defense and the state of Tennessee in 1993. Since 2015, Bulgaria also contributed troops to the Resolute Support Mission as a member of NATO.

Tennessee and Bulgaria were paired because they share similar geographical and cultural features. During the years since 1993, they have exchanged hundreds of soldiers on traveling contact teams and familiarization visits. Tennessee soldiers have also participated in major military exercises in Bulgaria sponsored by the U.S. Air Force and the U.S. Army in Europe, such as Cornerstone, Bulwark, etc. Many Bulgarian villages have been influenced in a positive way through Humanitarian Assistance initiatives in conjunction with military-to-military interaction.

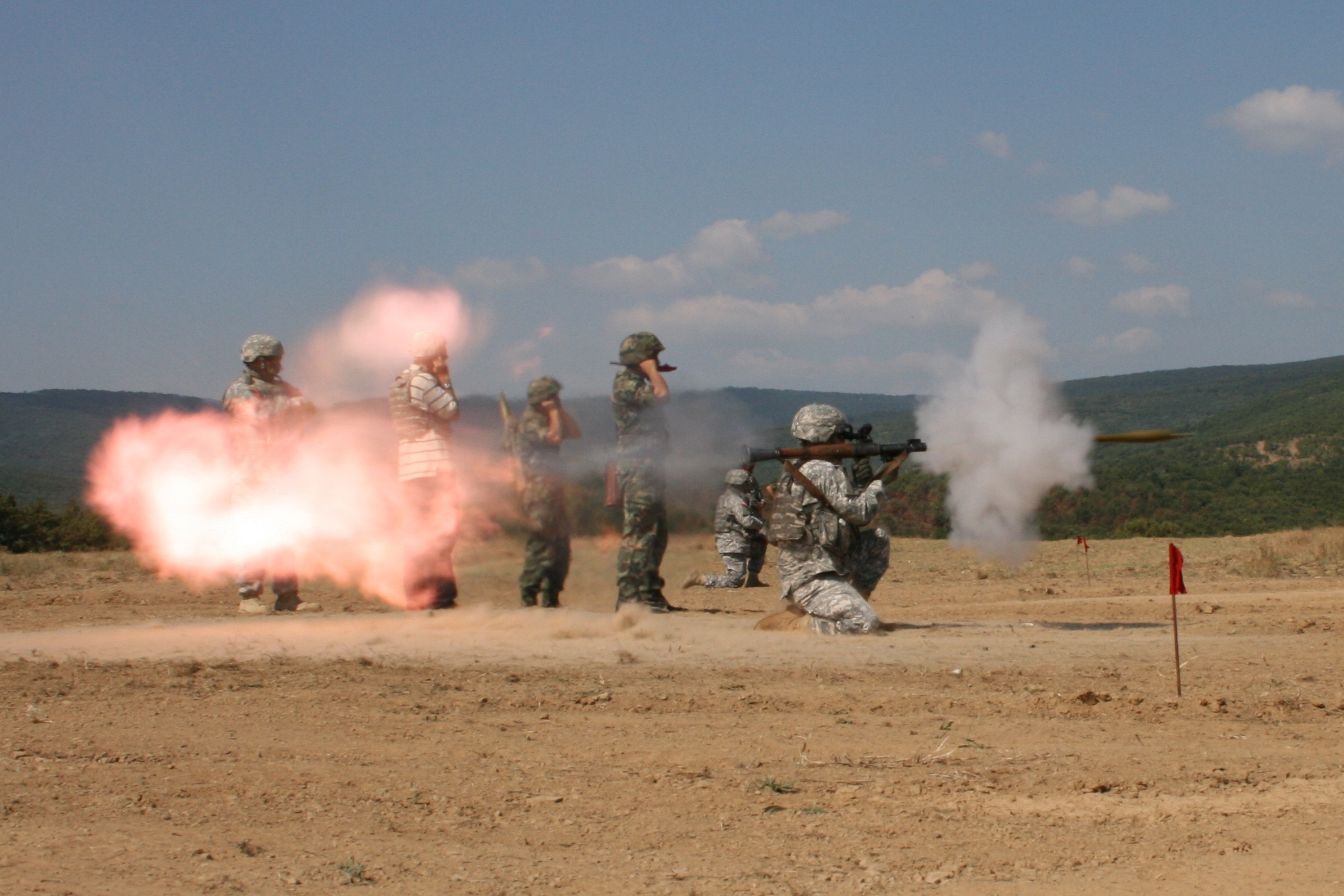
A Tennessee National Guard Soldier fires a rocket-propelled grenade at a shooting range in Bulgaria.

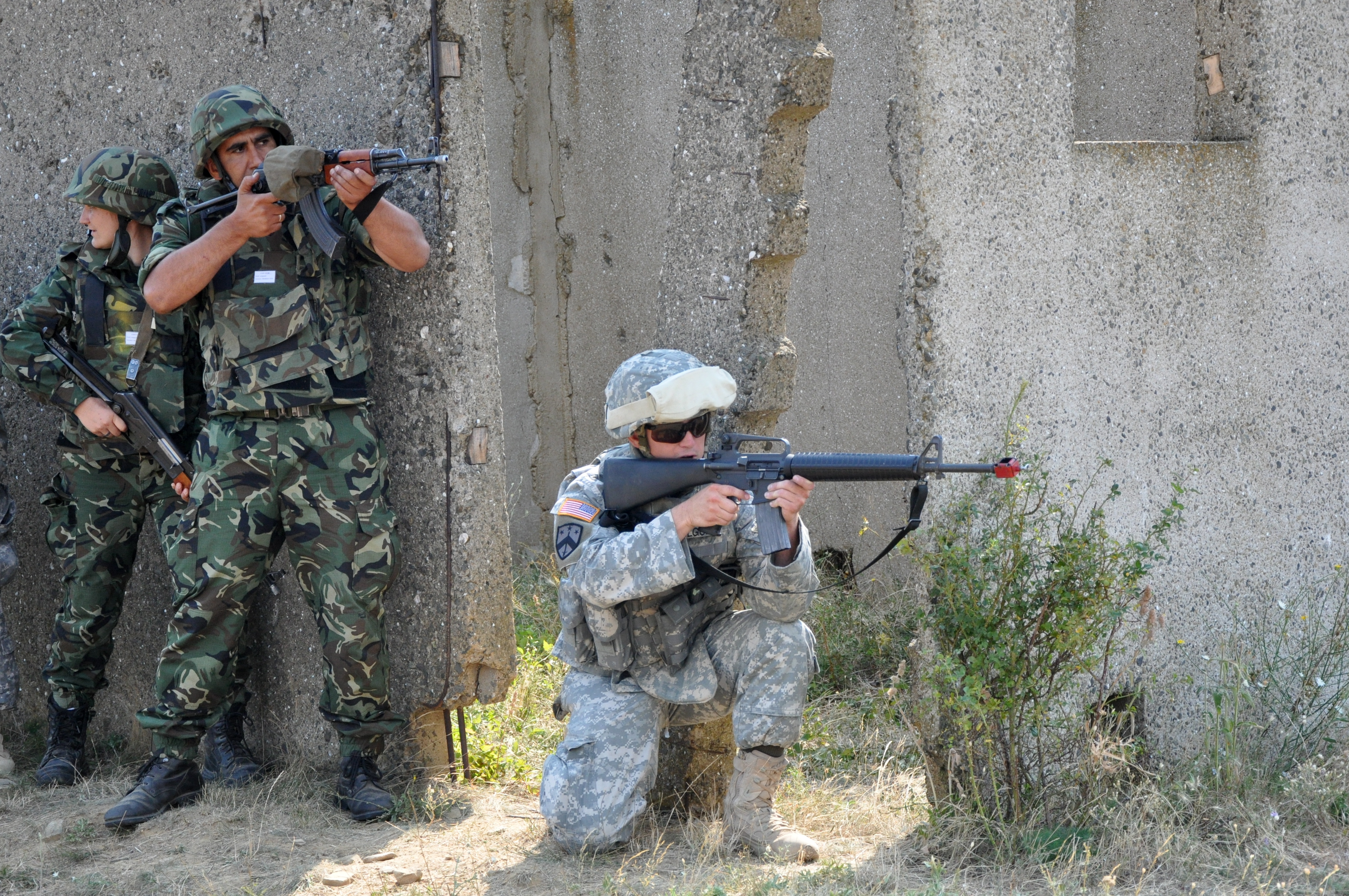
Soldiers from Tennessee and Bulgaria provide security for other service members as they sweep through a mock village during a training exercise.

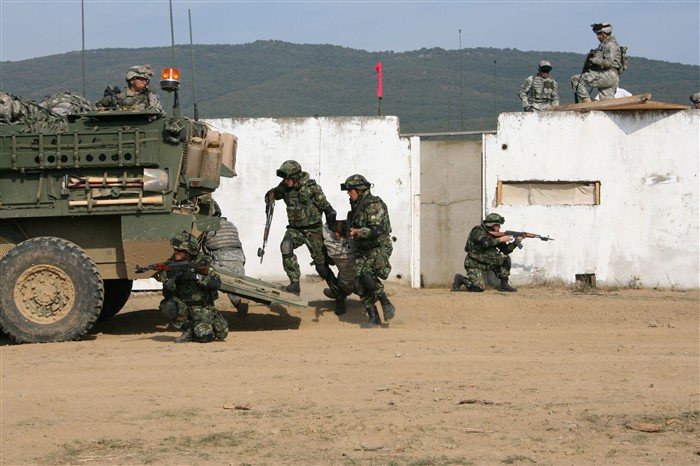
Soldiers from Bulgaria and Tennessee capture a high-value target during bilateral training conducted in Bulgaria.

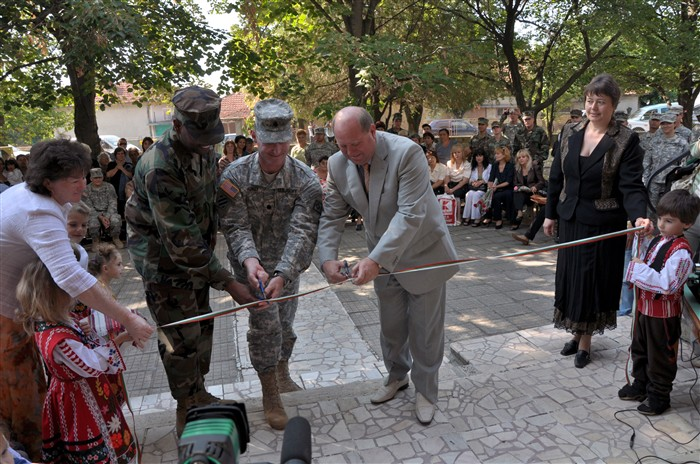
Soldiers from Tennessee participate in a ribbon-cutting ceremony marking the reopening of a kindergarten they helped renovate in Bulgaria.

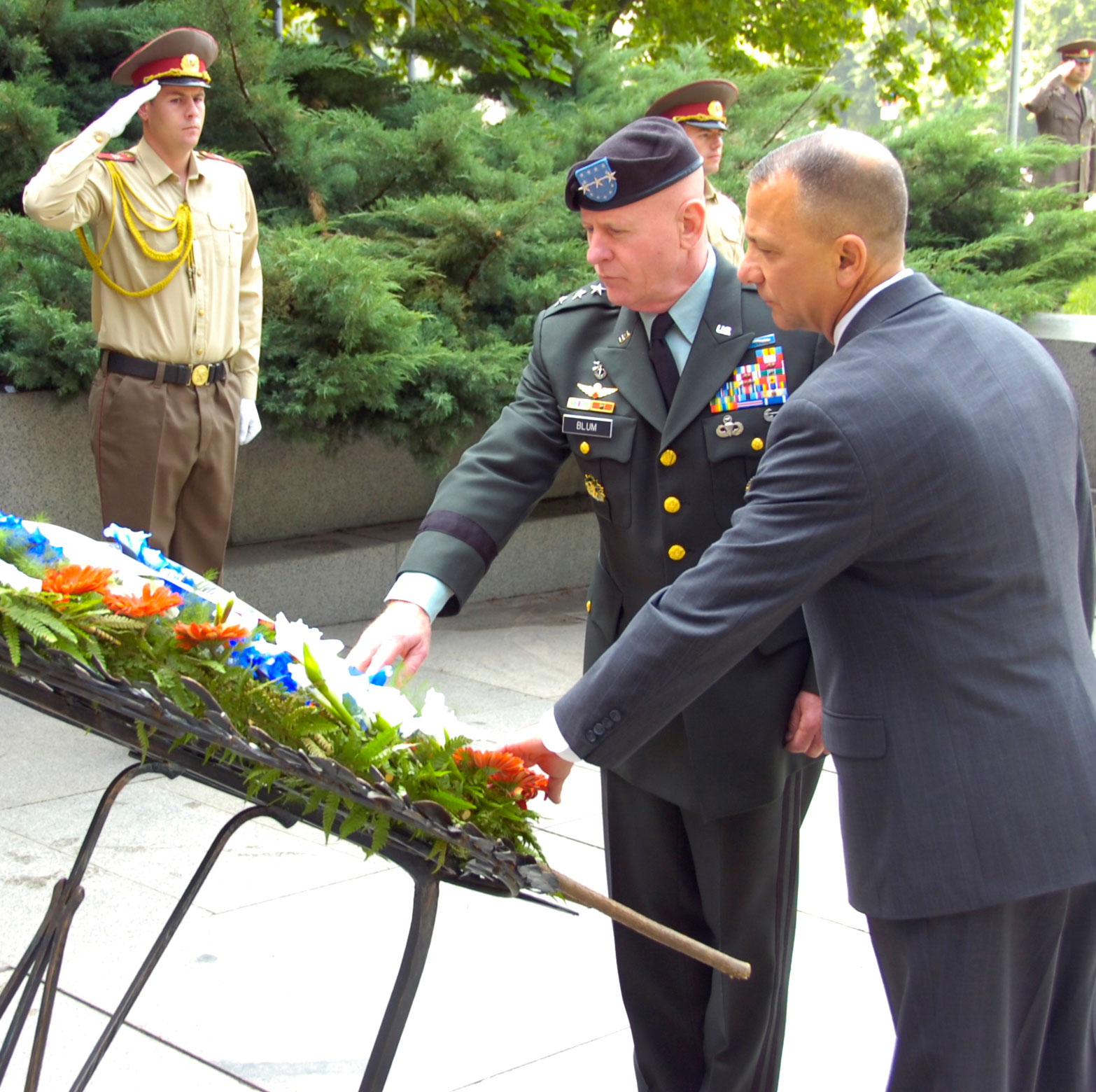
Chief of the National Guard Bureau Deputy Assistant Secretary of Defense for Homeland Security Integration, pay their respects during a wreath-laying ceremony at the Bulgarian Tomb of the Unknown Soldier in Sofia, Bulgaria, on June 2, 2008.

== History ==
=== Prelude to the partnership ===
On November 15, 1990, the People's Republic of Bulgaria was voted out of existence by the 7th Grand National Assembly, a special convocation of representatives from the entire nation for purposes of making Constitutional changes. It had been convoked by the Bulgarian Constitutional Assembly election, 1990, on June 10 and 17. Of the 400 seats, the Bulgarian Socialist Party, a mutation of the former Bulgarian Communist Party, won a majority of 210.

Having abolished the People's Republic, the Grand Assembly created the Republic of Bulgaria on July 12, 1991. Its Constitution was the 4th in its history. It was defined to be a unitary parliamentary republic.

The People's Republic of Bulgaria had belonged to the Soviet-Union dominated Warsaw Pact, an alliance of Eastern-bloc nations founded to counter the North Atlantic Treaty Organization (NATO). Due to the loss of numbers, the Warsaw Pact declared itself disbanded on July 1, 1991, shortly before the creation of the Republic of Bulgaria. The Soviet Union dissolved itself on December 25 of that year.

Russia and some states loyal to it went their own way with the Collective Security Treaty Organization of May 15, 1992. Most of the former Warsaw Pact nations were left hanging in the balance militarily; that is, the nature and function of their military establishments were uncertain. Russian forces had withdrawn or were withdrawing.

=== Initiation of the partnership ===
The first members of the Military Liaison Team arrived in Bulgaria in late July 1993. The team chief was Colonel Gary G. Chamberlin, accompanied by three more US military personnel. Their arrival caused something of a stir. On August 13, 1993, Duma, the Sofia daily newspaper, reported that: "four unidentified American Specialists have been roaming about Sofia for about 10 days. Without the approval of the government and not known by whose invitation, the guests with US epaulets are staying in the capital’s hotel, Shipka. What they are doing here is not fully clear.

The liaison team's first task upon arrival was to develop a country work plan, a trying event. The plan, completed in November 1993, contained a list of 16 quarterly events, a plan for the next quarter of 44 events, and a yearly work plan of 15 core events. Although all of the first-quarter events could not be completed, the staff did schedule most of them during the remainder of 1994. The interoperability, mutual trust, and understanding began to improve.

=== The partnership under NATO membership ===
Joint Contact teams continue to mature after Bulgaria's accession into NATO in 2004. EUCOM, Tennessee, and Bulgaria wanted to explore moving to the next step of complexity in engagement activities with respect to the State Partnership Program. The events that EUCOM proposed were to be the first time Tennessee National Guard units were to conduct their annual training in Bulgaria independent of a larger exercise. Several major SPP events need to be highlighted that have impacted either side in a significant way. Vigilant Sentry is an exercise that combined the efforts of both the 118th TN Medical group and the 168th Military Police Battalion. The Medical part objectives were to provide medical, dental, and pediatric care to the rural population in a joint effort with the Bulgarian Ministry of Defense and through the Military Academy, and in cooperation with the Military of Health. Sentry Lion is another interesting event that took place in 2006 at the third Bulgarian AF base at Graf Ignatievo. In this event, the TN Air Guard provided C-5 Cargo Transports to move the logistical equipment and support personnel from Oregon to Bulgaria.

Since the inception of the Tennessee-Bulgaria State Partnership Program, the following are notable accomplishments:

- More than 420 events have been executed since 1993.
- 31 SPP events have been executed since fiscal year 2009.
- 4 Operational Mentor and Liaison Team rotations
- Military Police NATO Combat Readiness Evaluation (CREVAL)
- Enriched military experiences and adopting new military concepts for both sides
- The Bulgarian Armed Forces realized the importance of the NCOs and started implementing a new policy that empowers the non-commissioned officers with a greater level of responsibilities.

== FY2012 highlights ==
In FY12, the Army Reserve Cadet Command executed the Culture and Language Proficiency Program. This is the very first time that American cadets have come to Bulgaria to interact with their Bulgarian counterparts. The event has contributed to the increased adaptability of the U.S. participants when in a new environment and enriched their skill set to cope with a different and unknown cultural context. On the other hand, the Bulgarian General Harizanov, who runs the National Military University, has conveyed in his letter of gratitude to MG Haston, that his students and NCOs’ marks were dramatically improved and gives the credit to this bilateral event in particular. Furthermore, the very same event will be executed in FY13, and this time there will be three rotations of American cadets who will be at three different military installations.

Ten SPP events have been executed:

- Visit of the TN Adjutant General to Bulgaria
- Crew resources management
- Combat readiness evaluation staff training
- Pre-deployment preparation
- Airdrop procedures
- Bulgarian Ministry of Defense senior enlisted visit
- Air Operations Center introduction and operations
- Non-commissioned officers' visit to TN Air Force bases
- Culture and language proficiency program event, including an ADVON visit

== Partnership focus ==
The following are EUCOM's stated areas of focus for the Tennessee-Bulgaria partnership:

- Foster national stability within the NATO framework
- Increase the Bulgarian coalition contribution through the Bulgarian Battle Group
- Put the stress on military police events and interaction
- More culture and language proficiency program rotations
- Leadership and non-commissioned officers developments
- Emergency management and disaster response

== ISAF Cooperation and OMLT teams ==
The Tennessee-Bulgaria State Partnership Program has accomplished a great deal in just 20 years. One of the most fruitful and unique initiatives is the so-called Operational Mentoring and Liaison Team (OMLT). Those rotations are part of the SPP portfolio. Its main objective was to bring together American and Bulgarian militaries and to train together, spreading out their knowledge to their Afghan counterparts. There were a total of three Garrison OMLT rotations from 2009 to 2011, and one C55 OMLT. The initial training took place in the National Military University in the town of Veliko Tarnovo, Bulgaria, and then continued in the Joint Multinational Readiness Center (JMRC) in Hohenfels, Germany. JMRC conducts several OMLT rotations each year, training multinational partners to ensure they are prepared for rotation to Afghanistan with the ability to train, advise, and enable the Afghan National Army while possessing skills to survive on the battlefield. The Bulgarians have accomplished their objectives in ISAF – led Core Training through executing different types of classes, such as IED training, M16 range, ANA doctrine, Log planning, CFF, and CAS, which were very useful for them. Different types of TTPs were rehearsed during those OMLT rotations, and many valuable skills have been acquired during this interaction, such as TSPs, reacting to ambushes, patrol drills, vehicle rollover training procedures, IED training, CAS, MEDEVAC, and call for fire.

One of the major engagements through SPP was the Bulgarian contingent in Afghanistan which consisted of 474 military personnel. They were involved in a wide range of military activities, such as a mechanized company embedded into the Italian Battle Group (Kabul) – 122 military personnel. The major tasks were patrolling and security of Invicta base and Kabul Airport; Security (guarding) platoon – 45 military personnel (protection of Waterhouse base and escort of logistical elements); recon team (five people); team for ATC of Kabul airport (two people); medical team (five people) – embedded into the French military hospital; guarding company -266 military personnel (protection and patrolling in the area of Kandahar airport); Bulgarian – US OMLT – Kandahar – seven Bulgarian military personnel; two medical teams (ten people) – embedded into the Spanish military hospital in Herat; two military personnel in the Hungarian PRT. In March 2009, the Bulgarians were withdrawn from that team.
