= 117th Military Police Battalion =

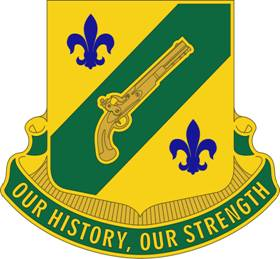
- 117th Military Police Battalion Distinctive Unit Insignia
- Active: 1923–Present
- Country: United States
- Branch: United States Army
- Type: Military Police Corps
- Role: Combat Support
- Size: Battalion
- Part of: Tennessee Army National Guard
- Battalion Headquarters: Athens, Tennessee
- Nickname: Call Sign: "Warriors"
- Mottos: "Our History, Our Strength"
- Colors: Green and Gold
- Engagements: World War II; Operation Desert Storm; Operation Iraqi Freedom; Operation Enduring Freedom

Commanders
- Battalion Commander: LTC Mitchell A. Thompson
- Command Sergeant Major: CSM Matthew J. Prieur

Insignia
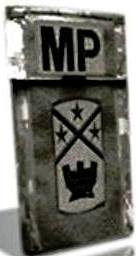
- Left Shoulder Sleeve Insignia

The 117th Military Police Battalion Combat Support (CS), is a military police battalion of the Tennessee Army National Guard (TNARNG) and the United States Army Military Police Corps with its headquarters located in Athens, Tennessee. When not mobilized or deployed, the 117th MP BN is task organized as a subordinate battalion of the Tennessee Army National Guard's 194th Engineer Brigade located in Jackson, Tennessee.

== Subordinate units ==
HHD 117th MP BN Athens, TN

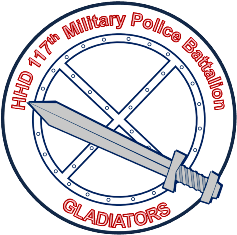
- Call Sign: Gladiator

252nd MP Company Cleveland, TN

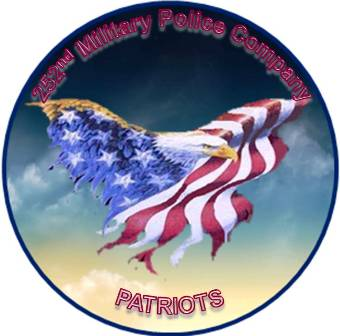
- Call Sign: Patriot

Detachment 1, 252nd MP Company Oneida, TN

253rd MP Company Lenoir City, TN

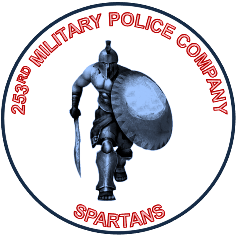
- Call Sign: Spartan

Detachment 1, 253rd MP Company Bristol, TN

269th MP Company Murfreesboro, TN

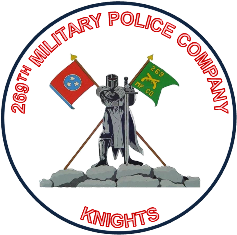
- Call Sign: Knight

== Mission summary ==
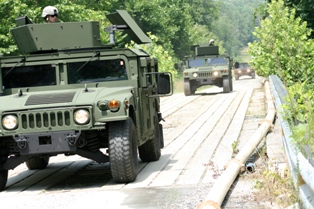
A convoy of the battalion

- The 117th Military Police Battalion (CS) can mobilize and deploy anywhere in the world as a multifunctional, full spectrum military police combat support force in support of U.S. military contingency operations. The BN can also be deployed within the U.S. and its territories in support of Department of Homeland Security operations and can provide Defense Support to Civil Authorities (DSCA) in the event of national, state, or local emergencies and natural or man-made disasters.
- The 117th MP BN provides command, control, and coordination for military police (MP) elements assigned or attached while facilitating the rapid deployment of organic tactical military police companies for combat operations, homeland security contingencies, and DSCA missions. On order, units of the BN provide security and mobility support, area security, law enforcement, internment and resettlement operations, police intelligence operations, protective services, antiterrorism functions, and support to federal, state, and local authorities under the direction of the United States Department of Defense (DOD) and the Tennessee Military Department

== History ==
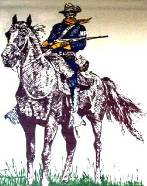

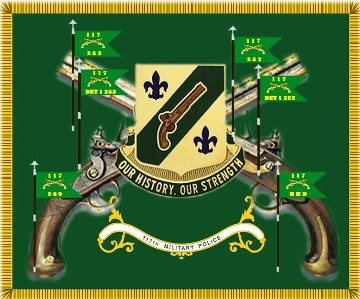

The motto of the 117th MP BN is "Our History, Our Strength". The painting of "Old Bill" (pictured above), wearing an MP brassard, symbolizes the history of the unit and resides on the drill hall wall of the Tennessee Army National Guard armory in Athens, TN. The painting is derived from the original drawing by noted artist Frederic Remington portraying a cavalryman mounted on his horse in the Great American West during the late 1800s. Old Bill is the adopted mascot of the United States Cavalry and is known throughout the U.S. Army's Armor and Cavalry communities as the symbol of mobile warfare. This depiction of Old Bill wearing an MP brassard represents the long shared history and lineage between the 117th MP BN (and its subordinate units in East Tennessee) with the 278th Armored Cavalry Regiment. The MP brassard was added to the painting (on Old Bill's left shoulder) during a ceremony in September 2006 when the unit in Athens (formerly Headquarters and Headquarters Troop, 1st Squadron, 278th Armored Cavalry Regiment) was reorganized and redesignated to its current designation as Headquarters and Headquarters Detachment, 117th Military Police Battalion.

== Lineage and honors ==
- Lineage

Organized and Federally recognized on 30 April 1923 in the Tennessee Army National Guard at Athens as Company E, 117th Infantry, an element of the 30th Division (later redesignated as the 30th Infantry Division)

Redesignated on 30 April 1938 as Company B, 117th Infantry

Inducted into Federal service on 16 September 1940 at Athens, TN.

Inactivated on 18 November 1945 at Fort Jackson, South Carolina, and relieved from assignment to the 30th Infantry Division

Reorganized and Federally recognized on 1 September 1947 in the Tennessee National Guard at Athens, TN as Headquarters and Headquarters Company, 1st Battalion, 278th Infantry

Ordered into active Federal service on 1 September 1950 at Athens, TN.

(Headquarters and Headquarters Company, 278th Infantry National Guard of the United States, organized and Federally recognized on 4 September 1952 at Athens, TN)

Released from active Federal service on 8 October 1954 and reverted to state control as Headquarters and Headquarters Company, 278th Infantry; concurrently, Federal recognition withdrawn from Headquarters and Headquarters Company, 278th Infantry (NGUS)

Reorganized and redesignated on 11 October 1954 as Headquarters and Service Company, 278th Armored Infantry Battalion

Assigned on 27 October 1954 to the 30th Armored Division

Consolidated on 1 March 1959 with the Medical Detachment, 278th Armored Infantry Battalion (organized and Federally recognized on 2 August 1955 at Athens, TN) and consolidated unit designated as Headquarters and Headquarters Company, 2d Armored Rifle Battalion, 117th Infantry, an element of the 30th Armored Division

Reorganized and redesignated on 1 April 1963 as Headquarters and Headquarters Company, 2d Battalion, 117th Infantry

Relieved on 1 November 1973 from assignment to the 30th Armored Division

Consolidated on 1 May 1977 with Detachment 1, Support Company, 2d Battalion, 117th Infantry (see ANNEX), and consolidated unit converted, reorganized, and redesignated as Headquarters and Headquarters Troop, 1st Squadron, 278th Armored Cavalry Regiment

Ordered into active Federal service on 22 June 2004 at Athens, TN; released from active Federal Service on 4 January 2006 and reverted to state control

Converted, reorganized, and redesignated on 1 September 2006 as Headquarters and Headquarters Detachment, 117th Military Police Battalion

- Lineage Annex

Organized and Federally recognized on 1 April 1947 in the Tennessee National Guard at Etowah, TN as Company A, 278th Infantry

Ordered into active Federal service 1 September 1950 at Etowah, TN

(Company A, 278th Infantry [NGUS], organized and Federally recognized on 5 September 1952 at Etowah, TN)

Released from active Federal service on 8 October 1954 and reverted to state control; concurrently, Federal recognition withdrawn from Company A, 278th Infantry (NGUS)

Reorganized and redesignated on 11 October 1954 as Company A, 278th Armored Infantry Battalion, an element of the 44th Armored Division

Reorganized on 1 March 1959 as Company A, 2d Armored Rifle Battalion, 117th Infantry

Redesignated on 1 April 1963 as Company A, 2d Battalion, 117th Infantry

Reorganized and redesignated on 1 February 1968 as the Ground Surveillance Section, Battalion Scout Platoon, Battalion Heavy Mortar Platoon, and Battalion Anti-Tank Platoon, Headquarters and Headquarters Company, 2d Battalion, 117th Infantry

Reorganized and redesignated on 1 March 1970 as Detachment 1, Headquarters and Headquarters Company, 2d Battalion, 117th Infantry

Reorganized and redesignated on 1 February 1972 as Support Company, 2d Battalion, 117th Infantry

Reorganized and redesignated on 1 October 1975 as Detachment 1, Support Company, 2d Battalion, 117th Infantry

Location changed 1 January 1977 to Athens, TN

Home Station: Athens, Tennessee

- Decorations

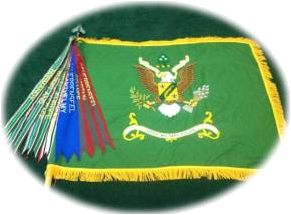

Presidential Unit Citation (Army), Streamer embroidered ST. BARTHELMY

Presidential Unit Citation (Army), Streamer embroidered SCHERPENSEEL

French Croix de Guerre with Palm, World War II, Streamer embroidered FRANCE

French Croix de Guerre with Palm, World War II, Streamer embroidered MORTAIN

French Croix de Guerre with Silver Star, World War II, Streamer embroidered SCHERPENSEEL

Belgian Fourragere 1940

Cited in the Order of the Day of the Belgian Army for action in Belgium

Cited in the Order of the Day of the Belgian Army for action in the Ardennes

- Campaign Participation Credit

World War II

Normandy

Northern France

Rhineland

Ardennes-Alsace

Central Europe

- Global War on Terrorism

Iraq (Iraqi Governance)

(Subordinate Units of the 117th MP BN have participated in the following:)

Iraq (Operation Desert Storm and Operation Iraqi Freedom) Afghanistan (Operation Enduring Freedom)

== Heraldry ==
- Distinctive Unit Insignia

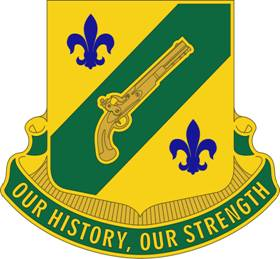

Description: A Gold color metal and enamel device 1 3/16 inches (3.02 cm) in width overall consisting of a shield blazoned as follows: Or, on a bend sinister Vert between two fleurs-de-lis Azure, a pistol, muzzle upward of the first. Attached below the shield a Green scroll inscribed “OUR HISTORY, OUR STRENGTH” in Gold.

- Symbolism: Yellow and green are the colors traditionally associated with Military Police units. The bend sinister signifies security. The fleurs-de-lis represent the Battalion's campaign credit during World War I and World War II. Blue indicates the unit's past affiliation in the Infantry branch. The pistol illustrates the mission of Military Police.
- Background: The distinctive unit insignia was approved on 7 May 2009.
- Motto: OUR HISTORY, OUR STRENGTH.
- Coat of Arms

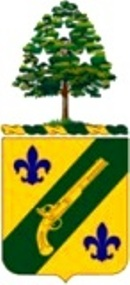

Blazon Shield: Or, on a bend sinister Vert between two fleurs-de-lis Azure, a pistol, muzzle upward, of the first. Crest: That for the regiments and separate battalions of the Tennessee Army National Guard: From a wreath Or and Vert, upon a mount of the second a hickory tree Proper charged with three mullets one and two Argent. Symbolism Shield: Yellow and green are the colors traditionally associated with Military Police units. The bend sinister signifies security. The fleurs-de-lis represent the Battalion's campaign credit during World War I and World War II. Blue indicates the unit's past affiliation in the Infantry branch. The pistol illustrates the mission of Military Police. Crest: The crest is that of the Tennessee Army National Guard. Background: The coat of arms was approved on 7 May 2009.
