= Jacob Phillips =

American football player (born 1999)

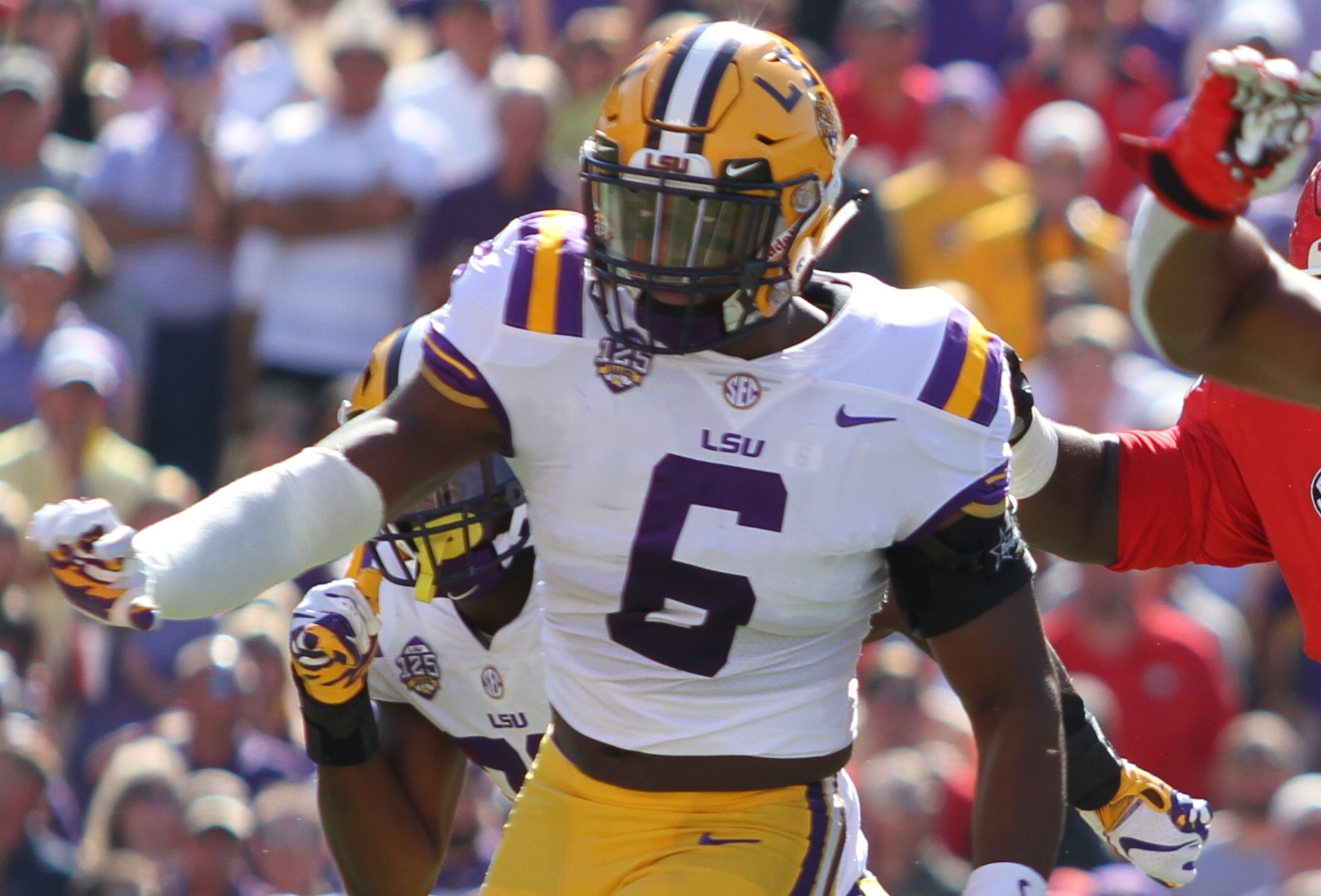
- Phillips with the LSU Tigers in 2018

Profile
- Position: Linebacker

Personal information
- Born: April 1, 1999 (age 27); Nashville, Tennessee, U.S.
- Listed height: 6 ft 3 in (1.91 m)
- Listed weight: 228 lb (103 kg)

Career information
- High school: East Nashville
- College: LSU (2017–2019)
- NFL draft: 2020: 3rd round, 97th overall pick

Career history
- Cleveland Browns (2020–2023); Houston Texans (2024)*; Indianapolis Colts (2025)
- * Offseason or practice squad member only

Awards and highlights
- CFP national champion (2019)

Career NFL statistics as of 2024
- Total tackles: 88
- Sacks: 3
- Pass deflections: 5
- Stats at Pro Football Reference

Jacob Phillips (born April 1, 1999) is an American professional football linebacker. He played college football for the LSU Tigers (LSU) and was selected by the Cleveland Browns in the third round of the 2020 NFL draft.

== Early life ==
Phillips attended East Nashville Magnet High School in Nashville, Tennessee. As a senior in 2016, he was selected Tennessee Mr. Football and played in the U.S. Army All-American Bowl. He was a semifinalist for the 2016 Butkus Award, which is given to the nation's top high school linebacker. A five-star recruit, Phillips was originally committed to play college football at the University of Oklahoma but later flipped his commitment to Louisiana State University (LSU).

== College career ==
As a true freshman at LSU in 2017, Phillips played in 12 games, recording 18 tackles. As a sophomore in 2018, he started 11 of 12 games and finished the season with 87 tackles and a sack. Phillips returned as a starter his junior year in 2019. Following a junior season where he led the team in tackles, Phillips announced that he would forgo his senior year and declared for the 2020 NFL draft.

== Professional career ==
Pre-draft measurables
Height	Weight	Arm length	Hand span	40-yard dash	10-yard split	20-yard split	20-yard shuttle	Three-cone drill	Vertical jump	Broad jump
6 ft 3 in (1.91 m)	229 lb (104 kg)	32 3/8 in (0.82 m)	10 in (0.25 m)	4.66 s	1.63 s	2.71 s	4.33 s	7.38 s	39.0 in (0.99 m)	10 ft 6 in (3.20 m)
All values from NFL Combine

=== Cleveland Browns ===
Phillips was selected by the Cleveland Browns in the third round with the 97th overall pick of the 2020 NFL draft. The Browns previously acquired this selection from the Houston Texans by trading Duke Johnson to Houston. Phillips was placed on the reserve/COVID-19 list by the team on December 26, 2020, and activated on December 31.

On September 1, 2021, Phillips was placed on injured reserve with a biceps injury. He was activated on December 11.

Phillips entered the 2022 season as the backup middle linebacker behind Anthony Walker. He became the starter in Week 4 following an injury to Walker. He started the next four games before being placed on injured reserve on October 26, 2022, after suffering a pectoral injury in Week 7.

On August 13, 2023, Phillips was placed on injured reserve.

=== Houston Texans ===
On April 23, 2024, Phillips signed a one-year contract with the Houston Texans for $1.15 million. He was released by the Texans on August 27.

=== Indianapolis Colts ===
On January 7, 2025, Phillips signed a reserve/future contract with the Indianapolis Colts. He was placed on season-ending injured reserve on August 18.

== NFL career statistics ==
=== Regular season ===
Year	Team	Games		Tackles					Interceptions						Fumbles	
Year	Team	GP	GS	Comb	Solo	Ast	Sack	Sfty	PD	Int	Yds	Avg	Lng	TD	FF	FR
2020	CLE	9	3	25	15	10	0.0	0	1	0	0	0.0	0	0	0	0
2021	CLE	4	1	17	14	3	1.0	0	3	0	0	0.0	0	0	0	0
Career		13	4	42	29	13	1.0	0	4	0	0	0.0	0	0	0	0
