= Tennessee Army National Guard =

Component of the US Army and military of the U.S. state of Tennessee

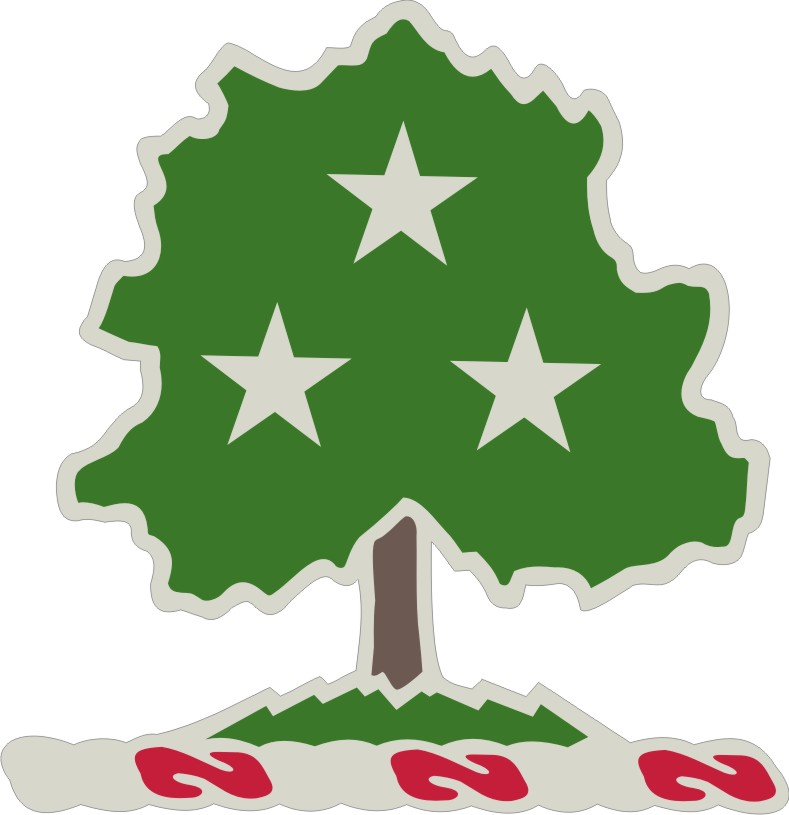
- Tennessee Army National Guard Headquarters DUI
- Active: 1903-present
- Country: United States
- Allegiance: Tennessee
- Branch: United States Army
- Type: Army
- Role: United States Army National Guard
- Size: 10,700+
- Part of: Tennessee Military Department
- Garrison/HQ: Nashville, Tennessee

Commanders
- Commander in Chief (Title 10 USC): President Donald Trump (when federalized); Major General Max Haston
- Commander in Chief (Title 32 USC): Governor Bill Lee
- Adjutant General: Major General Warner A. Ross II
- Director of the Joint Staff: Brigadier General Mark Tyndall

Insignia
- Tennessee Army National Guard Crest

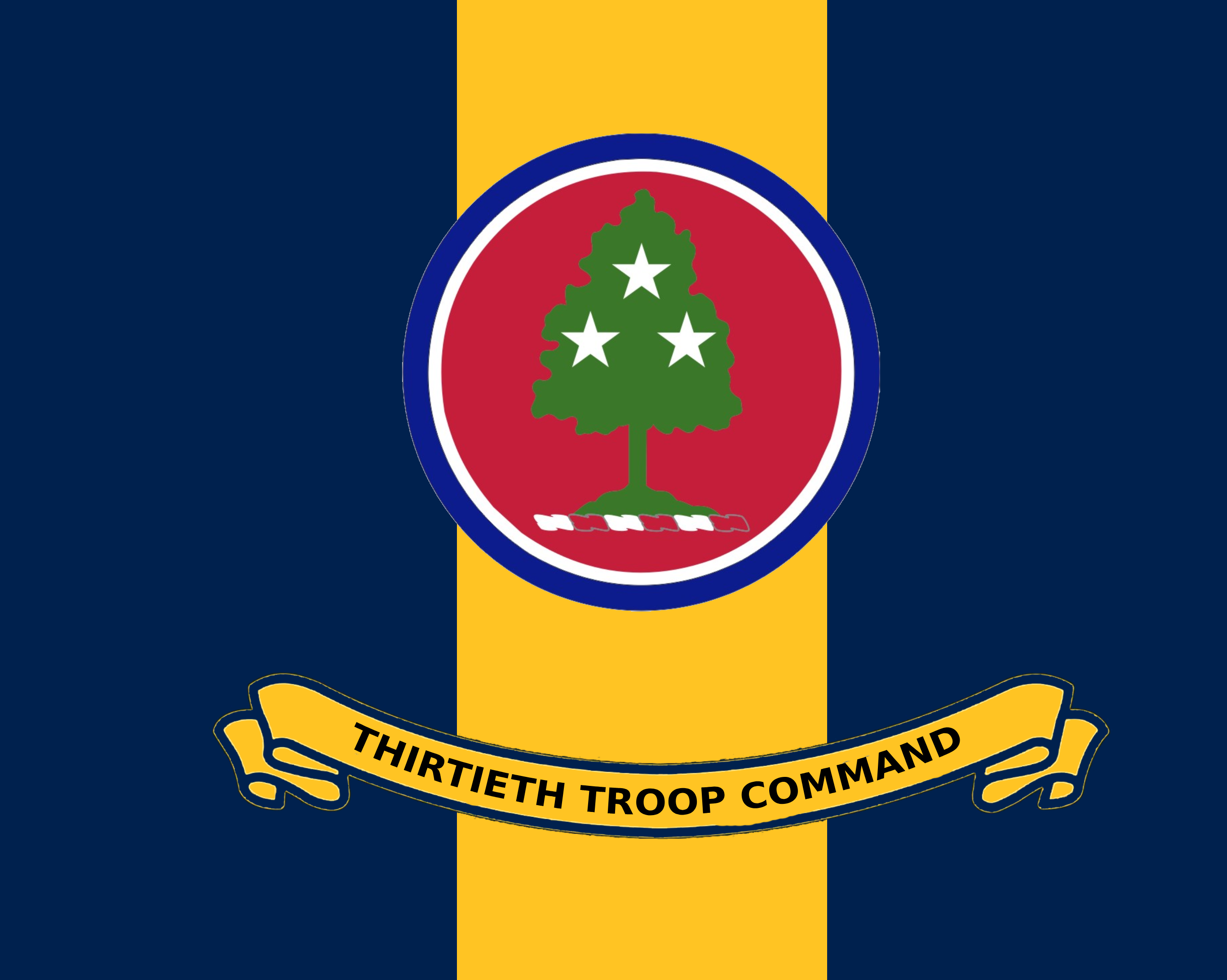
- Tennessee Army National Guard 30th Troop Command Flag

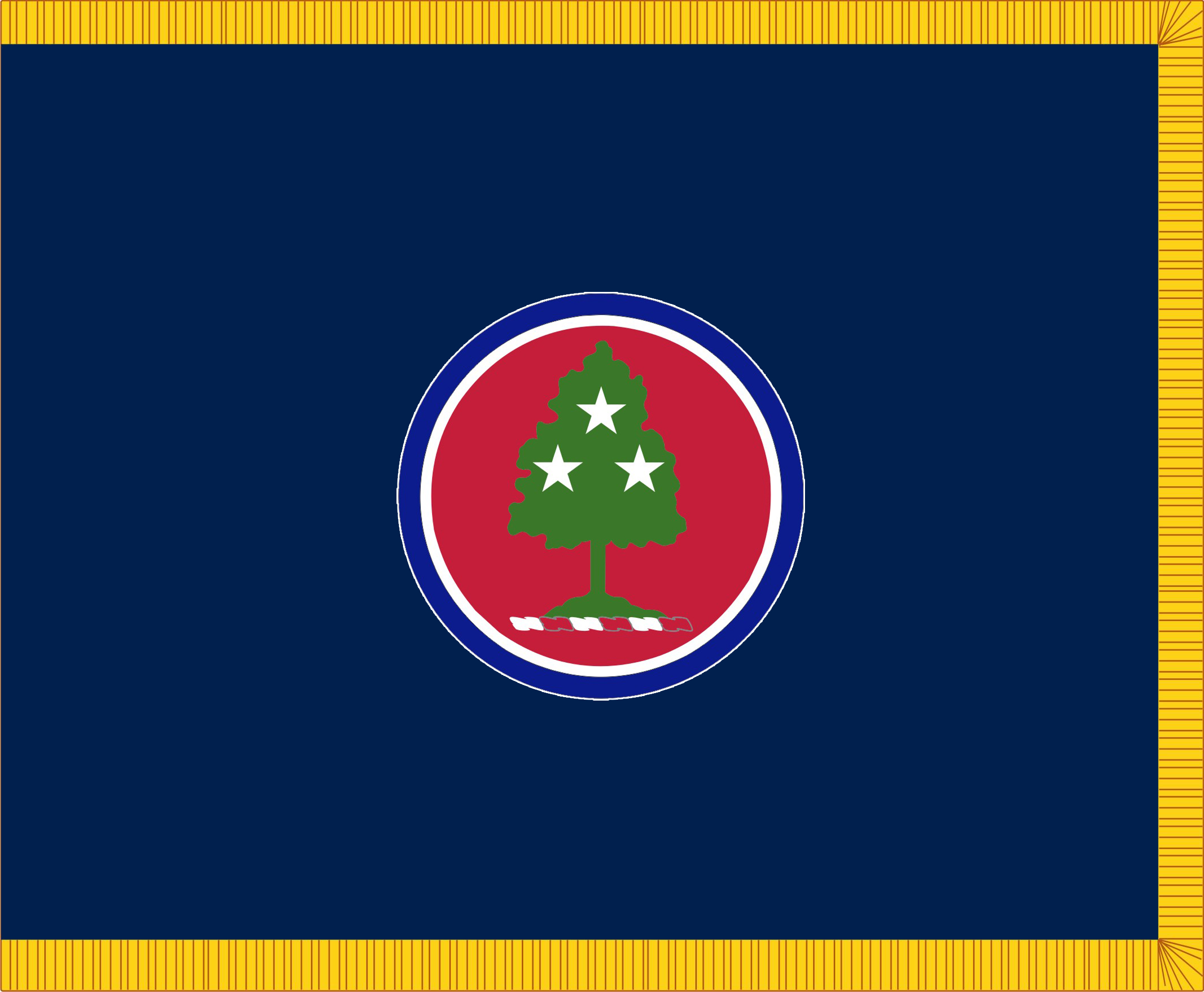
- Tennessee Army National Guard Headquarters Flag

The Tennessee Army National Guard is a component of the United States Army and the United States National Guard. It is administered by the Tennessee Military Department. National coordination of various state National Guard units are maintained through the National Guard Bureau.

Tennessee Army National Guard units are trained and equipped as part of the United States Army. The same ranks and insignia are used and National Guardsmen are eligible to receive all United States military awards. The Tennessee Guard also bestows a number of state awards for local services rendered in or to the state of Tennessee.

== History ==
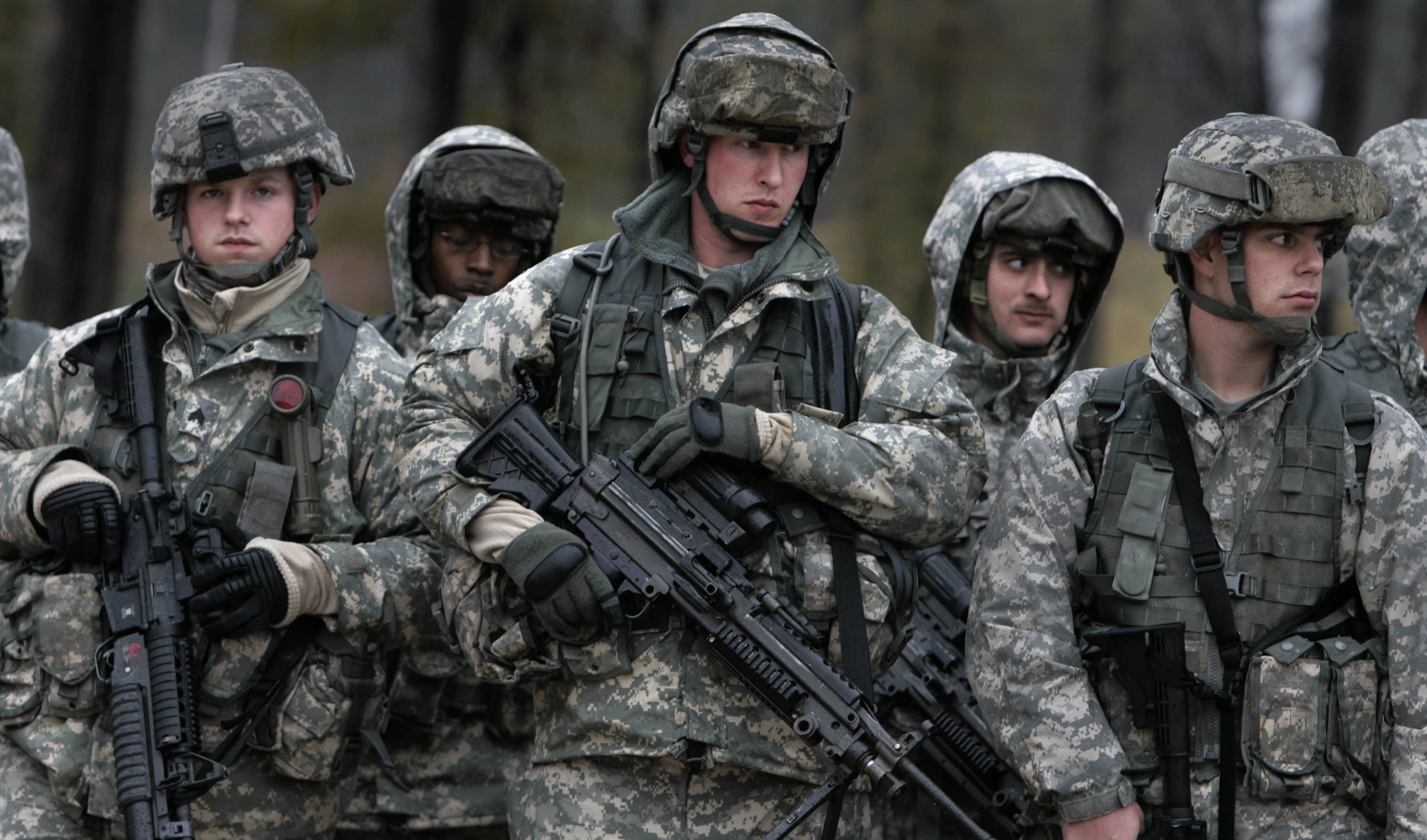
Tennessee Army National Guardsmen participating in training in preparation for deployment to Iraq, 2009

Tennessee's 45th General Assembly in 1887 established the Tennessee National Guard, as it is known today. State lawmakers set up the basic conditions under which the force would operate. Tennessee was among the first states to offer her full quota of soldiers for the Spanish–American War. The equipped Tennessee Guard units were mobilized. Four regiments were created, but only the 1st and 4th Regiments deployed overseas. In World War I, the 30th Infantry Division was deployed overseas. Tennessee personnel made up the 117th Infantry Regiment, the 114th and 115th Field Artillery, and the 114th Machine Gun Battalion.

After World War One, platoons of the Tennessee National Guard participated in the Knoxville riot of 1919. The Guard, which at one point fired two machine guns indiscriminately into the neighborhood, eventually dispersed the rioters.

When the 30th Infantry Division reorganized on 11 September 1947 it was composed of Guard units from North Carolina and Tennessee. In 1954 it was reorganized as a North‑South Carolina division with the Tennessee portion reorganized and redesignated as the 30th Armored Division. The 30th Armored Division was inactivated on 1 December 1973, with its lineage carried by the 30th Armored Brigade and the 30th Support Group, TN ARNG.

The 194th Engineer Brigade was activated as an entity of the Tennessee Army National Guard on 1 November 1973. This occurred as a result of the major reorganization of the Tennessee ARNG which inactivated the 30th Armored Division. The numerical designation was derived from a former engineer unit of the Tennessee Army National Guard, the 194th Engineer Battalion, headquartered in Centerville, Tennessee.

On 1 April 1979 the 670th Air Traffic Control Platoon was organized and Federally recognized in the Tennessee Army National Guard.

More than 3,600 Tennessee Guardsmen were mobilized for federal service ahead of the Gulf War (Operations Desert Shield and Desert Storm). The 196th Field Artillery Brigade (including the 1st Battalion, 181st Field Artillery) was one of only two Army Guard combat units to see actual combat. The Tennessee Army National Guard deployed 17 units during the conflict. A few days prior to G-Day, Tennessee's 212th Engineer Company, attached to the 101st Airborne Division (Air Assault), broke through the border berm into enemy territory, building a six-lane road. The unit traversed six miles before the ground war began, becoming the first unit of the 101st into Iraq and one of the first U.S. units to breach the Iraqi defensive zones.

The 30th Armored Brigade (Separate) furled its colors in Jackson, Tennessee in the early 1990s. The colors were passed to the 230th Area Support Group in Dyersburg, TN. The 230th has been inactivated since its return from Camp Arifjan, Kuwait.

The 670th Air Traffic Control Platoon was reorganized on 1 September 1996 in the Tennessee Army National Guard as the 107th Aviation, a parent regiment under the United States Army Regimental System, to consist of Company E. In 2005 it became the 107th Aviation Regiment.

== Organization ==
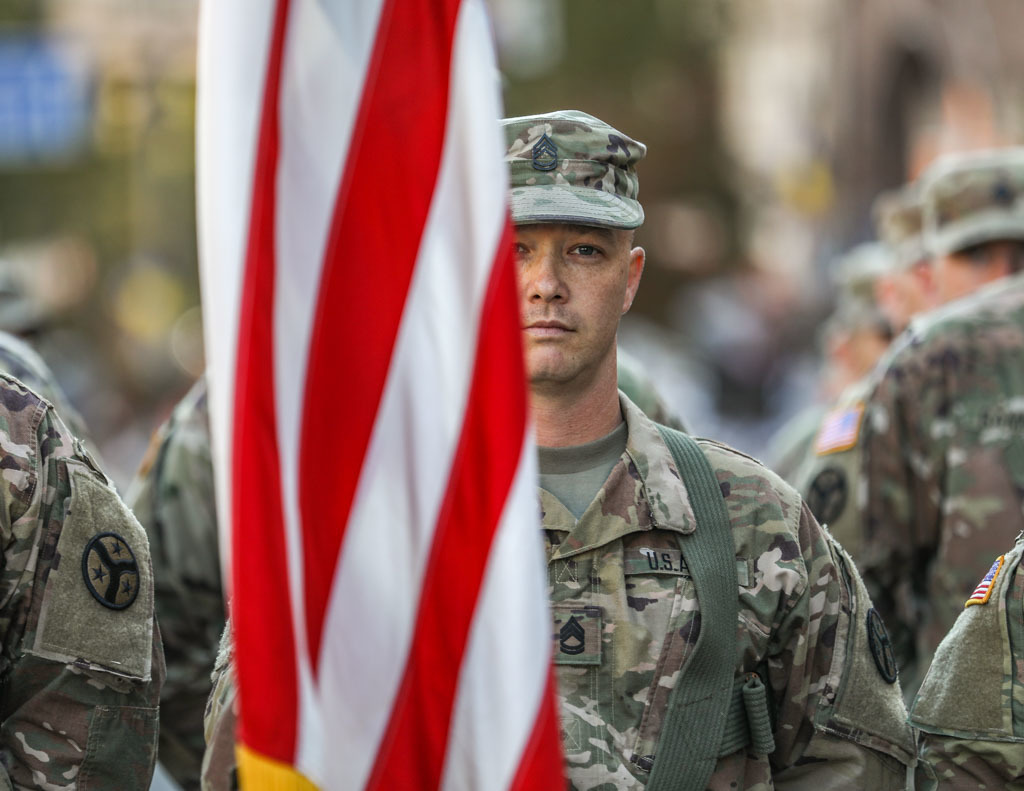
Sfc. Brian Lamm of the Tennessee Army National Guard stands in formation during the Ukrainian Independence Day parade in Kyiv, August 24, 2018

- Joint Force Headquarters-Tennessee, Army Element, in Nashville
  - Headquarters and Headquarters Company, Joint Force Headquarters-Tennessee, Army Element, in Nashville
  - Tennessee Recruiting & Retention Battalion, in Smyrna
  - Tennessee Medical Detachment, in Nashville
  - 45th Civil Support Team (WMD), in Nashville
  - Milan Volunteer Training Site, in Lavinia
  - Smyrna Volunteer Training Site, in Smyrna
  - Army Aviation Support Facility #1, at Smyrna Airport (TN)
  - Army Aviation Support Facility #2, at McGhee Tyson Airport (TN)
  - Army Aviation Support Facility #3, at Jackson Airport (TN)
  - Combined Support Maintenance Shop #1, in Smyrna
  - Unit Training Equipment Site #1, in Lavinia
  - Unit Training Equipment Site #2, at Fort Campbell
  - Field Maintenance Shop #1, in Smyrna
  - Field Maintenance Shop #2, in Louisville
  - Field Maintenance Shop #3, in Jackson
  - Field Maintenance Shop #6, in Lebanon
  - Field Maintenance Shop #7, in Tullahoma
  - Field Maintenance Shop #8, in Winchester
  - Field Maintenance Shop #9, in Nashville
  - Field Maintenance Shop #11, in Martin
  - Field Maintenance Shop #18, in Camden
  - 30th Troop Command, in Tullahoma
    - Headquarters and Headquarters Company, 30th Troop Command, in Tullahoma
    - 1st Battalion (Airfield Operations), 107th Aviation Regiment, at Smyrna Airport (part of 204th Theater Airfield Operations Group)
      - Headquarters and Headquarters Company, 1st Battalion (Airfield Operations), 107th Aviation Regiment, at Smyrna Airport
      - Airfield Management Element, 1st Battalion (Airfield Operations), 107th Aviation Regiment, at Smyrna Airport
      - Company A (ATS), 1st Battalion (Airfield Operations), 107th Aviation Regiment, at Smyrna Airport
    - 1st Battalion, 181st Field Artillery Regiment, in Chattanooga (M142 HIMARS) (part of 142nd Field Artillery Brigade)
      - Headquarters and Headquarters Battery, 1st Battalion, 181st Field Artillery Regiment, in Chattanooga
      - Battery A, 1st Battalion, 181st Field Artillery Regiment, in Lawrenceburg
      - Battery B, 1st Battalion, 181st Field Artillery Regiment, in Pulaski
        - Detachment 1, Battery B, 1st Battalion, 181st Field Artillery Regiment, in Fayetteville
      - 181st Forward Support Company, in Athens
        - Detachment 1, 181st Forward Support Company, in Dayton
    - 1st Battalion (Assault), 230th Aviation Regiment, at Smyrna Airport
      - Headquarters and Headquarters Company, 1st Battalion (Assault), 230th Aviation Regiment, at Smyrna Airport
        - Detachment 1, Headquarters and Headquarters Company, 1st Battalion (Assault), 230th Aviation Regiment, at Johnstown–Cambria County Airport (PA) — (Pennsylvania Army National Guard)
      - Company A, 1st Battalion (Assault), 230th Aviation Regiment, at Jackson Airport (UH-60M Black Hawk)
      - Company B, 1st Battalion (Assault), 230th Aviation Regiment, at Smyrna Airport (UH-60M Black Hawk)
      - Company C, 1st Battalion (Assault), 230th Aviation Regiment, at Johnstown–Cambria County Airport (PA) (UH-60M Black Hawk) — (Pennsylvania Army National Guard)
      - Company D (AVUM), 1st Battalion (Assault), 230th Aviation Regiment, at Smyrna Airport
        - Detachment 1, Company D (AVUM), 1st Battalion (Assault), 230th Aviation Regiment, at Johnstown–Cambria County Airport (PA) — (Pennsylvania Army National Guard)
        - Detachment 2, Company D (AVUM), 1st Battalion (Assault), 230th Aviation Regiment, at Jackson Airport
      - Company E (Forward Support), 1st Battalion (Assault), 230th Aviation Regiment, at Smyrna Airport
        - Detachment 1, Company E (Forward Support), 1st Battalion (Assault), 230th Aviation Regiment, at Johnstown–Cambria County Airport (PA) — (Pennsylvania Army National Guard)
        - Detachment 2, Company E (Forward Support), 1st Battalion (Assault), 230th Aviation Regiment, at Jackson Airport
      - Detachment 1, Company G (MEDEVAC), 1st Battalion (General Support Aviation), 111th Aviation Regiment, at Jackson Airport(HH-60L Black Hawk)
        - Detachment 6, Company D (AVUM), 1st Battalion (General Support Aviation), 111th Aviation Regiment, at Jackson Airport
        - Detachment 7, Company E (Forward Support), 1st Battalion (General Support Aviation), 111th Aviation Regiment, at Jackson Airport
      - Detachment 1, Company C (MEDEVAC), 2nd Battalion (General Support Aviation), 135th Aviation Regiment, at McGhee Tyson Airport (HH-60L Black Hawk)
        - Detachment 3, Company D (AVUM), 2nd Battalion (General Support Aviation), 135th Aviation Regiment, at McGhee Tyson Airport
        - Detachment 3, Company E (Forward Support), 2nd Battalion (General Support Aviation), 135th Aviation Regiment, at McGhee Tyson Airport
      - Detachment 1, Company C, 2nd Battalion (Security & Support), 151st Aviation Regiment, at Joint Base Berry Field (UH-72A Lakota)
      - Detachment 6, Company A, 2nd Battalion (Fixed Wing), 641st Aviation Regiment (Detachment 25, Operational Support Airlift Activity), at Smyrna Airport (C-12 Huron)
      - Detachment 3, Company B (AVIM), 628th Aviation Support Battalion, at McGhee Tyson Airport
    - 301st Troop Command Battalion, in Nashville
      - Headquarters and Headquarters Detachment, 301st Troop Command Battalion, in Nashville
      - 105th Human Resources Company, in Nashville
      - 118th Mobile Public Affairs Detachment, in Nashville
      - 129th Army Band, in Nashville
      - Detachment 2, Cyber Protection Team 175, in Nashville
      - 230th Medical Company (Area Support), in Smyrna
      - 230th Signal Company (Tactical Installation/Networking), in Nashville
      - 230th Digital Liaison Detachment, in Smyrna
      - 1128th Financial Management Support Detachment, in Nashville
      - 1957th Support Detachment (Contracting Team), in Nashville
  - 35th Division Sustainment Brigade, in Chattanooga
    - 35th Division Sustainment Troops Battalion, in Chattanooga
      - Headquarters and Headquarters Company, 35th Division Sustainment Brigade, in Chattanooga
      - 155th Signal Company, in Chattanooga
      - Company A (Composite Supply Company), 169th Division Sustainment Support Battalion, in Memphis
        - Detachment 1, Company A, 169th Division Sustainment Support Battalion, in Erwin
    - 30th Combat Sustainment Support Battalion, in Humboldt
      - Headquarters and Headquarters Company, 30th Combat Sustainment Support Battalion, in Humboldt
      - 1172nd Transportation Company (Medium Truck) (Cargo), in Memphis
        - Detachment 1, 1172nd Transportation Company (Medium Truck) (Cargo), in Waynesboro
      - 1175th Transportation Company (Combat HET), in Tullahoma
        - Detachment 1, 1175th Transportation Company (Combat HET), in Brownsville
    - 176th Combat Sustainment Support Battalion, in Johnson City
      - Headquarters and Headquarters Company, 176th Combat Sustainment Support Battalion, in Johnson City
      - 776th Ordnance Company (Support Maintenance), in Elizabethton
        - Detachment 1, 776th Ordnance Company (Support Maintenance), in Mountain City
      - 777th Ordnance Company (Support Maintenance), in Smyrna
      - 1176th Transportation Company (Light-Medium Truck), in Dresden
        - Detachment 1, 1176th Transportation Company (Light-Medium Truck), in Jacksboro
        - Detachment 1, 1176th Transportation Company (Light-Medium Truck), in Smyrna
  - 194th Engineer Brigade, in Jackson
    - Headquarters and Headquarters Company, 194th Engineer Brigade, in Jackson
    - 117th Military Police Battalion, in Athens
      - Headquarters and Headquarters Detachment, 117th Military Police Battalion, in Athens
      - 252nd Military Police Company (Combat Support), in Cleveland
        - Detachment 1, 252nd Military Police Company (Combat Support), in Oneida
      - 253rd Military Police Company (Combat Support), in Lenoir City
        - Detachment 1, 253rd Military Police Company (Combat Support), in Bristol
      - 269th Military Police Company (Combat Support), in Murfreesboro
    - 168th Military Police Battalion, in Dyersburg
      - Headquarters and Headquarters Detachment, 168th Military Police Battalion, in Dyersburg
      - 251st Military Police Company (Combat Support), in Lexington
        - Detachment 1, 251st Military Police Company (Combat Support), in Bolivar
      - 267th Military Police Company (Combat Support), in Dickson
        - Detachment 1, 267th Military Police Company (Combat Support), in Waverly
      - 268th Military Police Company (Combat Support), in Ripley
        - Detachment 1,268th Military Police Company (Combat Support), in Alamo
    - 230th Engineer Battalion, in Trenton
      - Headquarters and Headquarters Company, 230th Engineer Battalion, in Trenton
      - Forward Support Company, 230th Engineer Battalion, in Trenton
      - 190th Engineer Company (Mobility Augmentation Company), in Russellville
        - Detachment 1, 190th Engineer Company (Mobility Augmentation Company), in Jefferson City
      - 212th Engineer Company (Vertical Construction Company), in Paris
        - Detachment 1, 212th Engineer Company (Vertical Construction Company), in Camden
      - 255th Engineer Detachment (Asphalt), in Tennessee Ridge
      - 890th Engineer Company (Sapper), in Huntingdon
      - 913th Engineer Company (Engineer Construction Company), in Union City
  - 278th Armored Cavalry Regiment, in Knoxville
    - Headquarters and Headquarters Troop, 278th Armored Cavalry Regiment, in Knoxville
    - 1st Squadron, 278th Armored Cavalry Regiment, in Henderson
      - Headquarters and Headquarters Troop, 1st Squadron, 278th Armored Cavalry Regiment, in Henderson
      - Troop A (Tank), 1st Squadron, 278th Armored Cavalry Regiment, in Milan
      - Troop B (Tank), 1st Squadron, 278th Armored Cavalry Regiment, in Ashland City
      - Troop C (Mechanized Infantry), 1st Squadron, 278th Armored Cavalry Regiment, in Clarksville
    - 2nd Squadron, 278th Armored Cavalry Regiment, in Cookeville
      - Headquarters and Headquarters Troop, 2nd Squadron, 278th Armored Cavalry Regiment, in Cookeville
        - Detachment 1, Headquarters and Headquarters Troop, 2nd Squadron, 278th Armored Cavalry Regiment, in Gallatin
      - Troop E (Mechanized Infantry), 2nd Squadron, 278th Armored Cavalry Regiment, in Jamestown
        - Detachment 1, Troop E (Mechanized Infantry), 2nd Squadron, 278th Armored Cavalry Regiment, in Livingston
      - Troop F (Mechanized Infantry), 2nd Squadron, 278th Armored Cavalry Regiment, in McMinnville
      - Troop G (Tank), 2nd Squadron, 278th Armored Cavalry Regiment, in Crossville
    - 3rd Squadron, 278th Armored Cavalry Regiment, in Temple (TX) — (Texas Army National Guard)
      - Headquarters and Headquarters Troop, 3rd Squadron, 278th Armored Cavalry Regiment, in Temple
      - Troop I (Tank), 3rd Squadron, 278th Armored Cavalry Regiment, at Fort Hood
      - Troop K (Tank), 3rd Squadron, 278th Armored Cavalry Regiment, in Temple
      - Troop L (Mechanized Infantry), 3rd Squadron, 278th Armored Cavalry Regiment, in Temple
    - 4th Squadron, 278th Armored Cavalry Regiment, in Mount Carmel
      - Headquarters and Headquarters Troop, 4th Squadron, 278th Armored Cavalry Regiment, in Mount Carmel
      - Troop N, 4th Squadron, 278th Armored Cavalry Regiment, in Sweetwater
      - Troop O, 4th Squadron, 278th Armored Cavalry Regiment, in Newport
      - Troop P, 4th Squadron, 278th Armored Cavalry Regiment, in Greeneville
      - Troop Q (Tank), 4th Squadron, 278th Armored Cavalry Regiment, in Rockwood
    - Field Artillery Squadron, 278th Armored Cavalry Regiment, in Winchester
      - Headquarters and Headquarters Battery, Field Artillery Squadron, 278th Armored Cavalry Regiment, in Winchester
      - Battery A, Field Artillery Squadron, 278th Armored Cavalry Regiment, in Maryville
        - Detachment 1, Battery A, Field Artillery Squadron, 278th Armored Cavalry Regiment, in Pigeon Forge
      - Battery B, Field Artillery Squadron, 278th Armored Cavalry Regiment, in Covington
      - Battery C, Field Artillery Squadron, 278th Armored Cavalry Regiment, in Sparta
    - Regimental Engineer Squadron, 278th Armored Cavalry Regiment, in Lebanon
      - Headquarters and Headquarters Troop, Regimental Engineer Squadron, 278th Armored Cavalry Regiment, in Lebanon
      - Troop A (Combat Engineer), Regimental Engineer Squadron, 278th Armored Cavalry Regiment, in Dunlap
        - Detachment 1, Troop A (Combat Engineer), Regimental Engineer Squadron, 278th Armored Cavalry Regiment, in Monteagle
      - Troop B (Engineer Support), Regimental Engineer Squadron, 278th Armored Cavalry Regiment, in Russellville
      - Troop C (Signal), Regimental Engineer Squadron, 278th Armored Cavalry Regiment, in Knoxville
      - Troop D (Military Intelligence), Regimental Engineer Squadron, 278th Armored Cavalry Regiment, in Nashville
        - Detachment 1, Troop D (Military Intelligence), Regimental Engineer Squadron, 278th Armored Cavalry Regiment, at Naval Air Station Patuxent River (MD) (RQ-28A UAV) — (Maryland Army National Guard)
    - Regimental Support Squadron, 278th Armored Cavalry Regiment, in Columbia
      - Headquarters and Headquarters Troop, Regimental Support Squadron, 278th Armored Cavalry Regiment, in Columbia
      - Troop A (Distribution), Regimental Support Squadron, 278th Armored Cavalry Regiment, in Lobelville
        - Detachment 1, Troop A (Distribution), Regimental Support Squadron, 278th Armored Cavalry Regiment, in New Tazewell
      - Troop B (Maintenance), Regimental Support Squadron, 278th Armored Cavalry Regiment, in Centerville
      - Troop C (Medical), Regimental Support Squadron, 278th Armored Cavalry Regiment, in Louisville
      - Troop D (Forward Support), Regimental Support Squadron, 278th Armored Cavalry Regiment, in Clinton — attached to 4th Squadron
      - Troop E (Forward Support), Regimental Support Squadron, 278th Armored Cavalry Regiment, in Smyrna — attached to Regimental Engineer Squadron
      - Troop F (Forward Support), Regimental Support Squadron, 278th Armored Cavalry Regiment, in Lewisburg — attached to Field Artillery Squadron
      - Troop G (Forward Support), Regimental Support Squadron, 278th Armored Cavalry Regiment, in Humboldt — attached to 1st Squadron
        - Detachment 1, Troop G (Forward Support), Regimental Support Squadron, 278th Armored Cavalry Regiment, in Parsons
      - Troop H (Forward Support), Regimental Support Squadron, 278th Armored Cavalry Regiment, in Temple (TX) — attached to 3rd Squadron (Texas Army National Guard)
      - Troop I (Forward Support), Regimental Support Squadron, 278th Armored Cavalry Regiment, in Lafayette — attached to 2nd Squadron
        - Detachment 1, Troop I (Forward Support), Regimental Support Squadron, 278th Armored Cavalry Regiment, in Gordonsville
  - 117th Regiment, Regional Training Institute, in
    - 1st Battalion (Military Police)
    - 2nd Battalion (Armor)
    - 3rd Battalion (Quartermaster)

Aviation unit abbreviations: MEDEVAC — Medical evacuation; AVUM — Aviation Unit Maintenance; AVIM — Aviation Intermediate Maintenance

== See also ==
- Tennessee Air National Guard
- Tennessee State Guard
- Tennessee Military Department
