= Humanitas =

Latin noun

Humanitas (from the Latin hūmānus, "human") is a Latin noun meaning human nature, civilization, and kindness. It has uses in the Enlightenment, which are discussed below.

== Classical origins of term ==
The Latin word humanitas corresponded to the Greek concepts of philanthrôpía (loving what makes us human) and paideia (education) which were amalgamated with a series of qualities that made up the traditional unwritten Roman code of conduct (mos maiorum). Cicero (106–43 BCE) used humanitas in describing the formation of an ideal speaker (orator) who he believed should be educated to possess a collection of virtues of character suitable both for an active life of public service and a decent and fulfilling private life; these would include a fund of learning acquired from the study of bonae litterae ("good letters", i.e., classical literature, especially poetry), which would also be a source of continuing cultivation and pleasure in leisure and retirement, youth and old age, and good and bad fortune.

Insofar as humanitas corresponded to philanthrôpía and paideia, it was particularly applicable to guiding the proper exercise of power over others. Hence Cicero's advice to his brother that "if fate had given you authority over Africans or Spaniards or Gauls, wild and barbarous nations, you would still owe it to your humanitas to be concerned about their comforts, their needs, and their safety." Echoing Cicero over a century later, Pliny the Younger (61–112 CE) defined humanitas as the capacity to win the affections of lesser folk without impinging on greater.

== Revival in Early Italian Renaissance ==
The concept was of great importance during the re-discovery of classical antiquity during the Renaissance by the Italian umanisti, beginning with the illustrious Italian poet Petrarch, who revived Cicero's injunction to cultivate the humanities, which were understood during the Renaissance as grammar, rhetoric, poetry, history, and moral philosophy.

In 1333, in Liège, Belgium, Petrarch found and copied out in his own hand a manuscript of Cicero's speech, Pro Archia, which contained a famous passage in defense of poetry and litterae (letters):

Haec studia adolescentiam alunt, senectutem oblectant, secundas res ornant, adversis perfugium ac solacium praebent, delectant domi, non impediunt foris, pernoctant nobiscum, peregrinantur, rusticantur.

— Pro Archia paragraph 16.
Translation:

These studies nourish youth, entertain old age, enhance prosperity, offer refuge and solace too in adversity, delight us at home, not hindering us out of doors, spend the night with us, go abroad, and live in the countryside.

Petrarch liked this quotation and referred to it often, and where Cicero used the phrase "litterarum lumen", "the light of literature", Petrarch in the margin wrote lumen litterarum alongside and drew a sketch of a lamp or candle. The Liège manuscript is lost and so is Petrarch's copy, but Petrarch's copy "can be shown to be behind all but one of the later manuscripts" and preserves Petrarch's marginal annotations. Petrarch, in many respects a medieval man, regretted that Cicero had not been a Christian and believed that he certainly would have been one had he not died before the birth of Jesus. To Petrarch and the Renaissance umanisti who immediately followed him, Cicero's humanitas was not seen as in conflict with Christianity or a Christian education. In this they followed the fifth century Church fathers such as Jerome and Augustine, who taught that Greek and Roman learning and literature were gifts of God and models of excellence, provided, of course, they were filtered and purified in order to serve Christianity.

== Humanitas during the French Enlightenment ==
According to historian Peter Gay, the eighteenth-century French philosophes of the Enlightenment found Cicero's eclectic, Stoic-tinged paganism congenial:

The ideal of humanitas was first brought to Rome by the philosophic circle around Scipio and further developed by Cicero. For Cicero, humanitas was a style of thought, not a formal doctrine. It asserted man's importance as a cultivated being, in control of his moral universe. The man who practiced humanitas was confident of his worth, courteous to others, decent in his social conduct, and active in his political role. He was a man, moreover, who faced life with courageous skepticism: he knows that the consolations of popular religion are for more credulous beings than himself, that life is uncertain, and that sturdy pessimism is superior to self-deceptive optimism. Man becomes man as he refines himself; he even becomes godlike: “Deus est mortali iuvare mortalem,” wrote Pliny, translating a Greek Stoic, “To help man is man's true God.” Finally, the man who practiced humanitas cultivated his aesthetic sensibilities as he listened to his reason: "Cum musis,” wrote Cicero, “id est, cum humanitate et doctrina habere commercium". Virtue, Cicero insisted, is nothing but nature perfected and developed to its highest point, and there is therefore a resemblance between man and God: "Est autem virtus nihil aliud quam in se perfecta et ad summum perducta natura; est igitur homini cum deo similitudio"...

Cicero's humanitas... reappeared in the first century in Seneca's claim – made in the midst of a lament over Roman bestiality – that man is a sacred thing to man: “homo res sacra homini”; and reappeared once more in the eighteenth century in Kant's call for human autonomy and in Voltaire's stern injunction: “Remember your dignity as a man.” In the beginning of his Meditations, the Emperor Marcus Aurelius elaborated a veritable catalog of qualities which, all together, made up the virtues which Cicero had called humanitas and which the philosophes hoped they possessed in good measure: modesty, self-control, manliness, beneficence, practicality, generosity, rationality, tolerance, and obedience to the dictates of nature.

== Revival in 18th- and 19th-century Germany ==
During the Aufklärung (the German version of the eighteenth-century Enlightenment), the term "Humanität" was used to designate the intellectual, physical, and moral formation of "a better human being" (or Humanism). It was used, for example, by theologian Johann Gottfried Herder in his Briefe zur Beförderung der Humanität (Letters for the Advancement of Humanity), 1792, and by Friedrich Schiller, among others.

Herder's Humanität is a broad concept he defines variously as the gradual fulfillment of best human potential, the achievement of reason and fairness in all classes and in all affairs of men, and the joint product of the creative actions of legislators, poets, artists, philosophers, inventors, and educators through the ages.

Although Herder is considered the originator of ethnic nationalism, he was no chauvinist. He maintained that each person loves his own nation, family, language, and customs not because they are better than other peoples' but because they are his. Love for one's own individuality ought to lead to respect for that of others. For Herder, the image of God was imprinted in each human being, along with an internal impulse for self-improvement and growth. Historian William McNeil writes that Herder boldly proclaimed that:

each age and every people embody ideals and capacities peculiar to themselves, thus allowing a fuller and more complete expression of the multiform potentialities of humankind than could otherwise occur. Herder expressly denied that one people or civilization was better than another. They were just different, in the same way that the German language was different from the French.

== Humanitas as benevolence ==
In Roman humanism, benevolence (benevolentia) was considered a feature of humanitas. This is particularly emphasized in the works of Cicero and Seneca. In this context, benevolence drives the idea of humaneness and is understood as a feeling either of love or tenderness that makes "someone willing to participate, at the level of feeling, in whatever is human." Such participation entails a willingness to engage both in human suffering and joy. This was echoed in the Kantian position on love, which cited a so-called rational benevolence driven by natural sympathetic joy and pity.

Others have also discussed benevolence in modern humanism. Max Scheler, for example, used it in his discourse on sympathy. In one of his works, he linked benevolence and the concept of "fellow-feeling," which allows self-love, self-centred choice, solipsism, and egoism" to finally be wholly overcome. Scheler equated benevolence with humanitarianism, explaining that these concepts — along with fellow-feeling — embrace all men, "simply because they are men."

Humanitas as benevolence is also a cornerstone of the credo of Freemasonry and constituted one of the bases for its position that nationality and religion do not matter, only universal humanity. Some orders of Freemasonry are called "Humanitas".

== See also ==
- Humanities – Academic disciplines that study society and culture
- Liberal arts – Traditional academic course in Western higher education
- Paideia – Educational model once used in Athens
