= 107th Aviation Regiment (United States) =

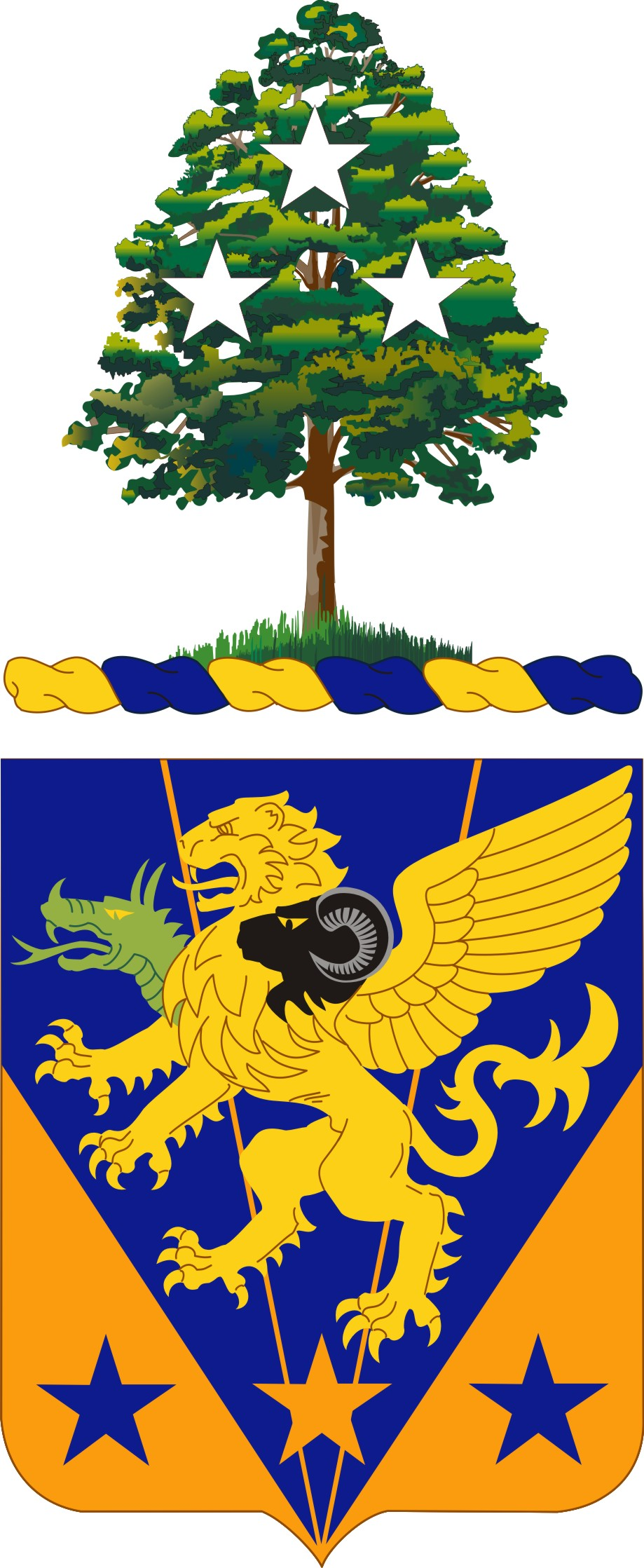
Unit crest

The 107th Aviation Regiment is an aviation regiment of the United States Army, primarily provided by the Army National Guard.

The regiment was organized and Federally recognized 1 April 1979 in the Tennessee Army National Guard as the 670th Air Traffic Control Platoon. It was reorganized 1 September 1996 in the Tennessee Army National Guard as the 107th Aviation, a parent regiment under the United States Army Regimental System, to consist of Company E.

Redesignated 1 October 2005 as the 107th Aviation Regiment.

The 1st Battalion, 107th Aviation, is an air operations battalion in the Tennessee Army National Guard. It is part of the 30th Troop Command. In August 2021, they were deployed to the Horn of Africa.

== Organization ==
- 1st Battalion (Airfield Operations), 107th Aviation Regiment, at Smyrna Airport (TN)
  - Headquarters and Headquarters Company, 1st Battalion (Airfield Operations), 107th Aviation Regiment, at Smyrna Airport (TN)
  - Airfield Management Element, 1st Battalion (Airfield Operations), 107th Aviation Regiment, at Smyrna Airport (TN)
  - Company A (ATS), 1st Battalion (Airfield Operations), 107th Aviation Regiment, at Smyrna Airport (TN)
