= Paideia =

Educational model once used in Athens

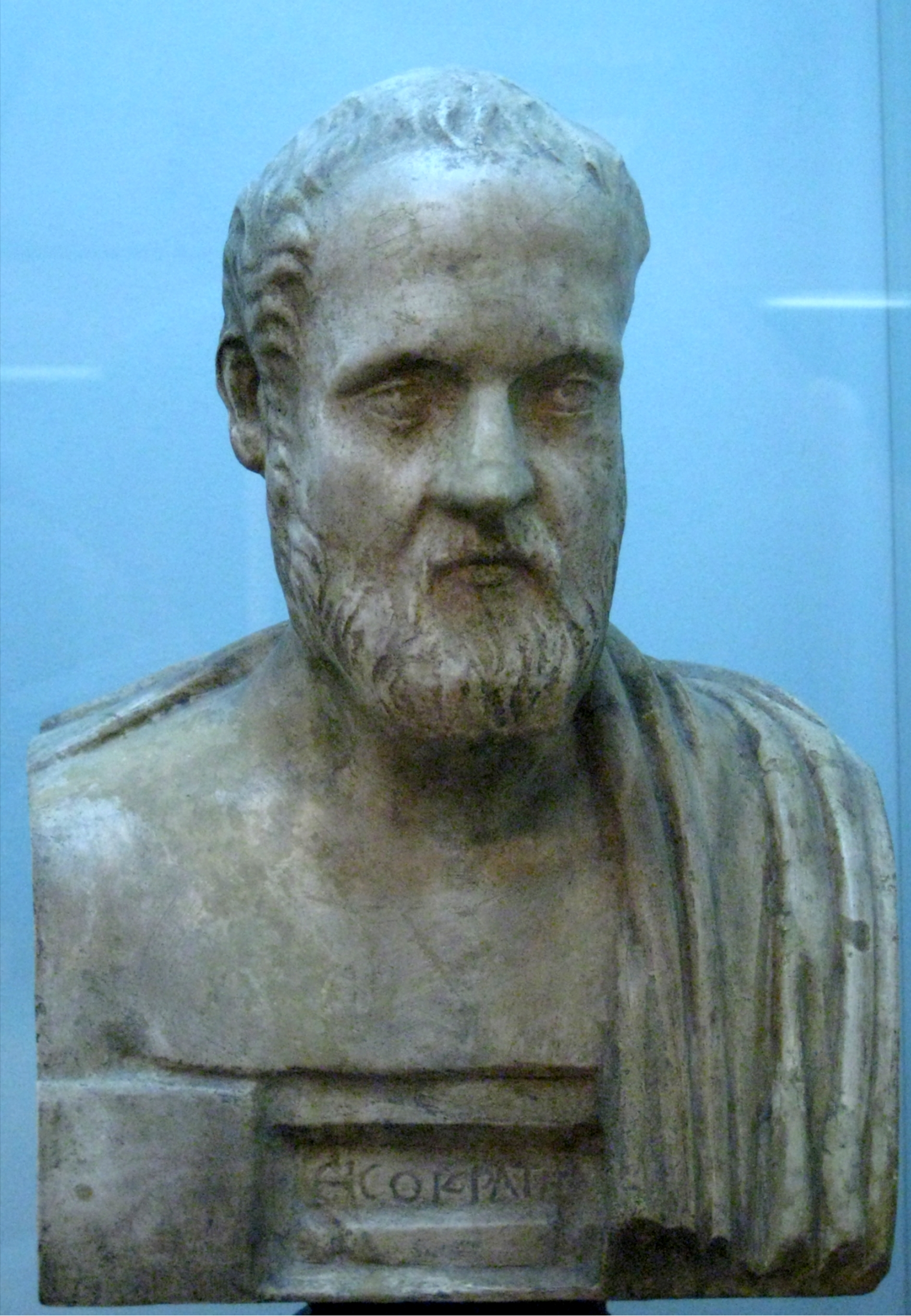
Isocrates, shown here in a copy of a bust from Villa Albani in Rome, was one of the foremost thinkers about paideia.

Paideia (/paɪˈdeɪə/; also spelled paedeia; Greek: παιδεία) referred to the rearing and education of the ideal member of the ancient Greek polis or state. These educational ideals later spread to the Greco-Roman world at large, and were called humanitas in Latin.

Paideia was meant to instill aristocratic virtues in the young citizen men who were trained in this way. An ideal man within the polis would be well-rounded, refined in intellect, morals, and physicality, so training of the body, mind, and soul was important. Both practical, subject-based schooling as well as a focus upon the socialization of individuals within the aristocratic order of the polis were a part of this training.

The practical aspects of paideia included subjects within the modern designation of the liberal arts (e.g. rhetoric, grammar, mathematics, and philosophy), as well as scientific disciplines like medicine. Gymnastics and wrestling were valued for their effect on the body alongside the moral education which was imparted by the study of music, poetry, and philosophy.

This approach to the rearing of a well-rounded Greek male was common to the Greek-speaking world, with the exception of Sparta, where agoge was practiced.

== The idea of paideia in ancient and modern cultures ==
The Greeks considered paideia to be carried out by the aristocratic class, who tended to intellectualize their culture and their ideas. The culture and the youth were formed to the ideal of kalos kagathos ("beautiful and good").

Aristotle gives his paideia proposal in Book VIII of the Politics. In this, he says that, "education ought to be adapted to the particular form of constitution, since the particular character belonging to each constitution both guards the constitution generally and originally establishes it..." As a result, Aristotle argues that education should be a public system, not left up to individuals. He goes on to deliberate about what a proper education should entail, weighing different subjects, such as music and drawing, against their benefit towards cultivating virtue. He lists the ways he believes that gymnastic training should be carried out, bringing up some Spartan practices in order to see the benefits and drawbacks of their system. He talks extensively about music and its place in education, ultimately concluding that it should be included, but that there should be specific instruction, "in what times and what rhythms they should take part, and also what kinds of instruments should be used in their studies, as this naturally makes a difference."

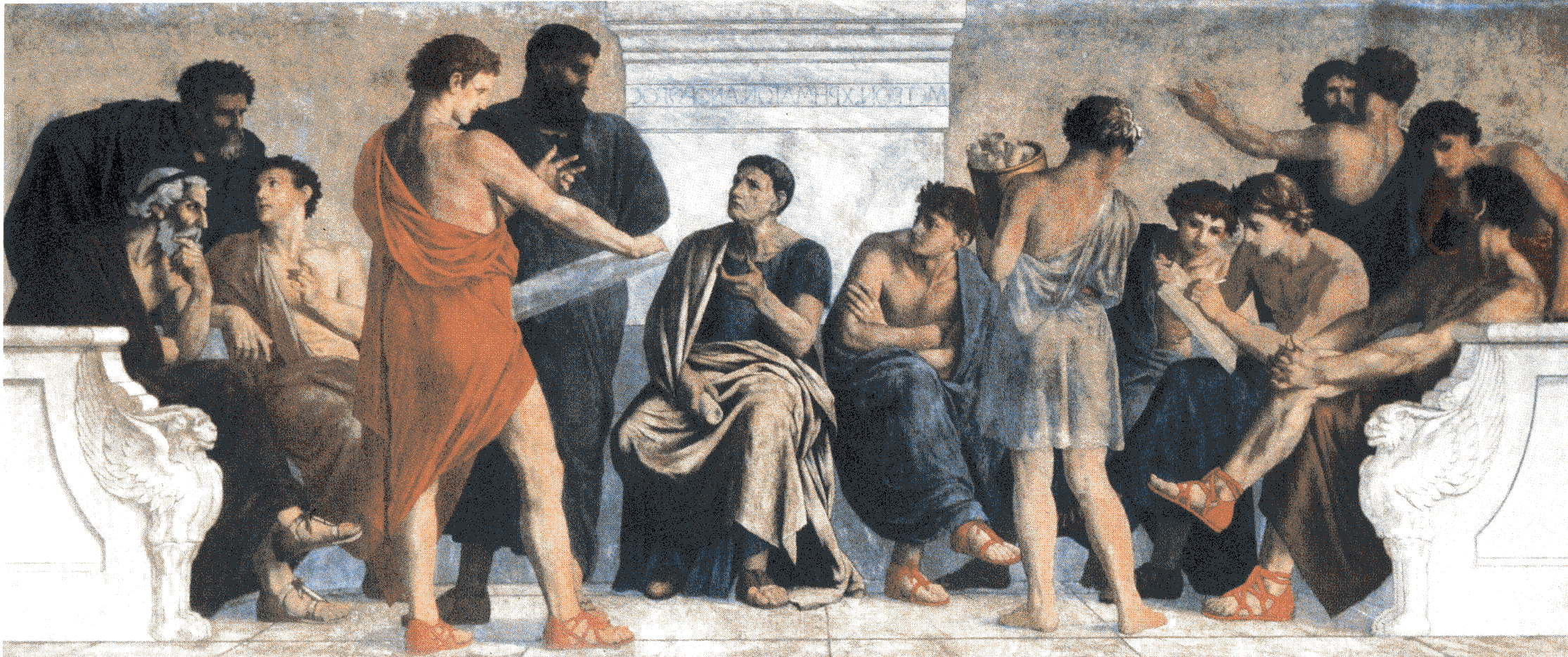
The School of Aristotle, by Gustav Adolph Spangenberg

The German-American classicist Werner Jaeger used the concept of paideia to trace the development of Greek thought and education from Homer to Demosthenes in Paideia: The Ideals of Greek Culture, Aristotelian philosopher Mortimer Adler gives a paideia proposal in his criticism of contemporary Western educational systems.

== Isocrates' influence ==
Isocrates' paideia was quite influential, particularly in Athens. Its goal was to construct a practice of education and politics that brought validity in the democratic deliberative practice while remaining intellectually respectable. Isocrates sought to encourage a love of wisdom in his audience by making them apply principles of intellectual consistency to their lives. The fundamental aspect of his paideia was consistency on the individual, civic, and panhellenic levels.

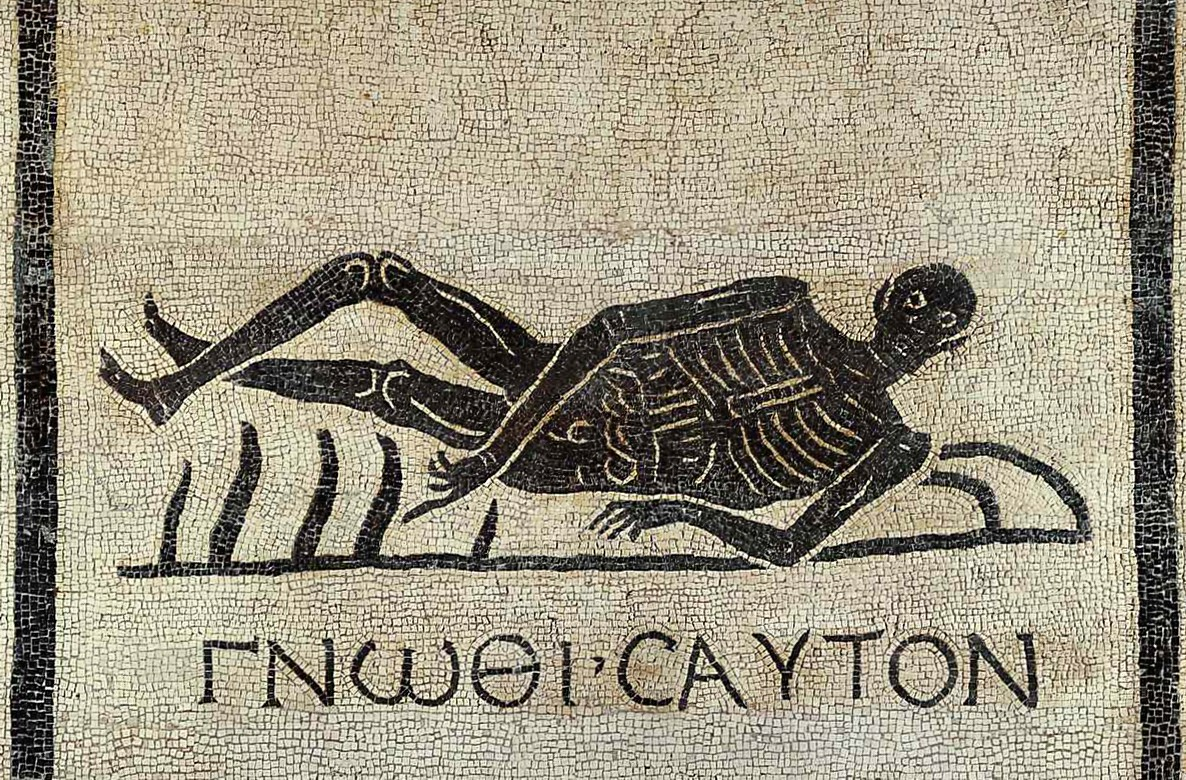
A memento mori mosaic from excavations in the convent of San Gregorio in Rome, featuring the Greek motto "γνῶθι σεαυτόν", meaning "Know thyself".

== Sayings and proverbs that defined paideia ==
- "Know thyself" and "Nothing in excess"
- "Hard is the Good."

== See also ==
- Arete
- Classical education
- The Paideia School
