= Paideia Proposal =

Educational reform plan

- Author: Mortimer J. Adler
- Publication date: 1982
- Website: paideia.org

The Paideia Proposal is a K–12 educational reform plan first proposed in 1982 by Mortimer Adler. Adler was a prolific author, and references to the Paideia proposal for educational reform can be found in a number of his books listed in the references below.

== The proposal ==
The Paideia Proposal is a system of liberal education intended for students of all ages, including those who will never attend a university. It was a response to what Adler characterized as the United States' antidemocratic or undemocratic educational system, a holdover from the 19th century, when the understanding of universal suffrage and basic human rights fell short of 20th century expectations. Adler further believed that a system oriented primarily for vocational training has as its objective the training of slaves, not free men, and that the only preparation necessary for vocational work is to learn how to learn, since many skilled jobs would be disappearing.

As the Paideia Proposal developed, the original Paideia Group gave way to a National Center for the Paideia Program. That organization, which eventually became the National Paideia Center, formulated a Declaration of Principles:

We believe...

1. that all children can learn;
2. that, therefore, they all deserve the same quality of schooling, not just the same quantity;
3. that the quality of schooling to which they are entitled is what the wisest parents would wish for their own children, the best education for the best being the best education for all;
4. that schooling at its best is preparation for becoming generally educated in the course of a whole lifetime, and that schools should be judged on how well they provide such preparation;
5. that the three callings for which schooling should prepare all Americans are, (a) to earn a decent livelihood, (b) to be a good citizen of the nation and the world, and (c) to make a good life for oneself;
6. that the primary cause of genuine learning is the activity of the learner’s own mind, sometimes with the help of a teacher functioning as a secondary and cooperative cause;
7. that the three types of teaching that should occur in our schools are didactic teaching of subject matter, coaching that produces the skills of learning, and Socratic questioning in seminar discussion;
8. that the results of these three types of teaching should be (a) the acquisition of organized knowledge, (b) the formation of habits of skill in the use of language and mathematics, and (c) the growth of the mind’s understanding of basic ideas and issues;
9. that each student’s achievement of these results should be evaluated in terms of that student’s competencies and not solely related to the achievements of other students;
10. that the principal of the school should never be a mere administrator, but always a leading teacher who should be cooperatively engaged with the school’s teaching staff in planning, reforming, and reorganizing the school as an educational community;
11. that the principal and faculty of a school should themselves be actively engaged in learning;
12. that the desire to continue their own learning should be the prime motivation of those who dedicate their lives to the profession of teaching.

Adler stressed that the proposal is much more than just a return to the basic skills of reading, writing and arithmetic. It is not simply a return to the values of classical civilization, but a return to what is of enduring value. It is a democratic proposal intended for the education of all, and not an elitist program as some have alleged. He also believed that individual differences, especially with respect to the natural endowments and natural environments from which children come, must be compensated by remedial or supplementary instruction and preschool tutoring, as needed.

He proposed a curriculum framework within which each state or school district could pluralistically vary constituent areas of study. The curriculum of the Paideia Proposal was divided into six broad categories, with the first four being conventionally intellectual. The fifth involved manual skills (not for a vocational purpose, but to acquire the mental agility of learning with one's hands), and the sixth category introduced students to the world of work:

1. Language, Literature and the Fine Arts;
2. Mathematics and Natural Science;
3. History, Geography and Social Studies;
4. Foreign Language;
5. Physical Education (12 years), and Manual Training including cooking, sewing, typing, machine repair (6 years);
6. A general introduction to the world of work (last 2 years).

== Teaching and learning styles ==
The essence of the proposal involved three necessary types of learning and respective types of teaching: knowing what, knowing how, and knowing why: One of these was lacking from present-day practice after kindergarten and first grade.

Didactic instruction (traditional lecturing) was by and large the primary mode of teaching being applied in the traditional system. Its purpose was for the acquisition of organized knowledge or facts. Adler placed the least value on this form of knowledge, arguing that it generally fades away with time, asserting for example that he had forgotten almost all of the information imparted to him in this fashion.

Coaching is performed so that the student may acquire the skills of learning, such as reading, writing, speaking, listening, calculating, problem-solving, estimating, measuring, and exercising critical judgement. Skills are habits, not memories, thus are much more durable than memories, especially memories not based upon understanding. Skills must also be maintained to remain sharp, and are less durable than the understanding achieved through the Socratic method.

The Socratic seminar (extended discussion) is the only path to understanding basic ideas and values. This cannot be acquired through didactic teaching or coaching. The basis of discussion cannot be textbooks, but must be works of art or text that deal with ideas and values. Adler states that our teachers are totally untrained for this. Seminars would be constructed in two dimensions. In the vertical dimension, the teacher would provide and order questions aimed at the development of understanding ideas (not for covering predetermined ground). In a horizontal dimension, discussion would be open to all possible answers from students in response to the questions. If a seminar is too open in both dimensions, or focused primarily within the horizontal dimension, it may become loose and undirected. When it is directed and controlled in both dimensions or focused primarily on the vertical dimension, it becomes didactic and dogmatic. Seminar styles would vary widely depending on subject matter and participants, but Adler felt that any teacher who follows his prescription and is also a superior learner, cannot fail to allow his students to also become inspired and lifelong learners.

== See also ==
- Philosophy of education

== Notes ==
- Adler, Mortimer J. (1982). The Paideia Proposal: An Educational Manifesto. New York: Simon & Schuster. ISBN 0-684-84188-6.
- Adler, Mortimer J. (1983). Paideia Problems and Possibilities: A Consideration of Questions Raised by The Paideia Proposal. New York: Macmillan Publishing Company. ISBN 0-02-013050-3. (pbk.)
- Adler, Mortimer J. (1984). The Paideia Program: An Educational Syllabus: Essays by the Paideia Group. ISBN 0-02-013040-6.
- Adler, Mortimer J.; Geraldine Van Doren (1988). Reforming Education: The Opening of the American Mind. New York: Macmillan. ISBN 0-02-500551-0.
- Adler, Mortimer J. (1992). A Second Look in the Rearview Mirror: Further Autobiographical Reflections of a Philosopher at Large. New York: Macmillan. ISBN 0-02-500571-5. See Chapter 4, "Educational Reform: The Paideia Project" (pp. 61–121).
