= 168th Military Police Battalion =

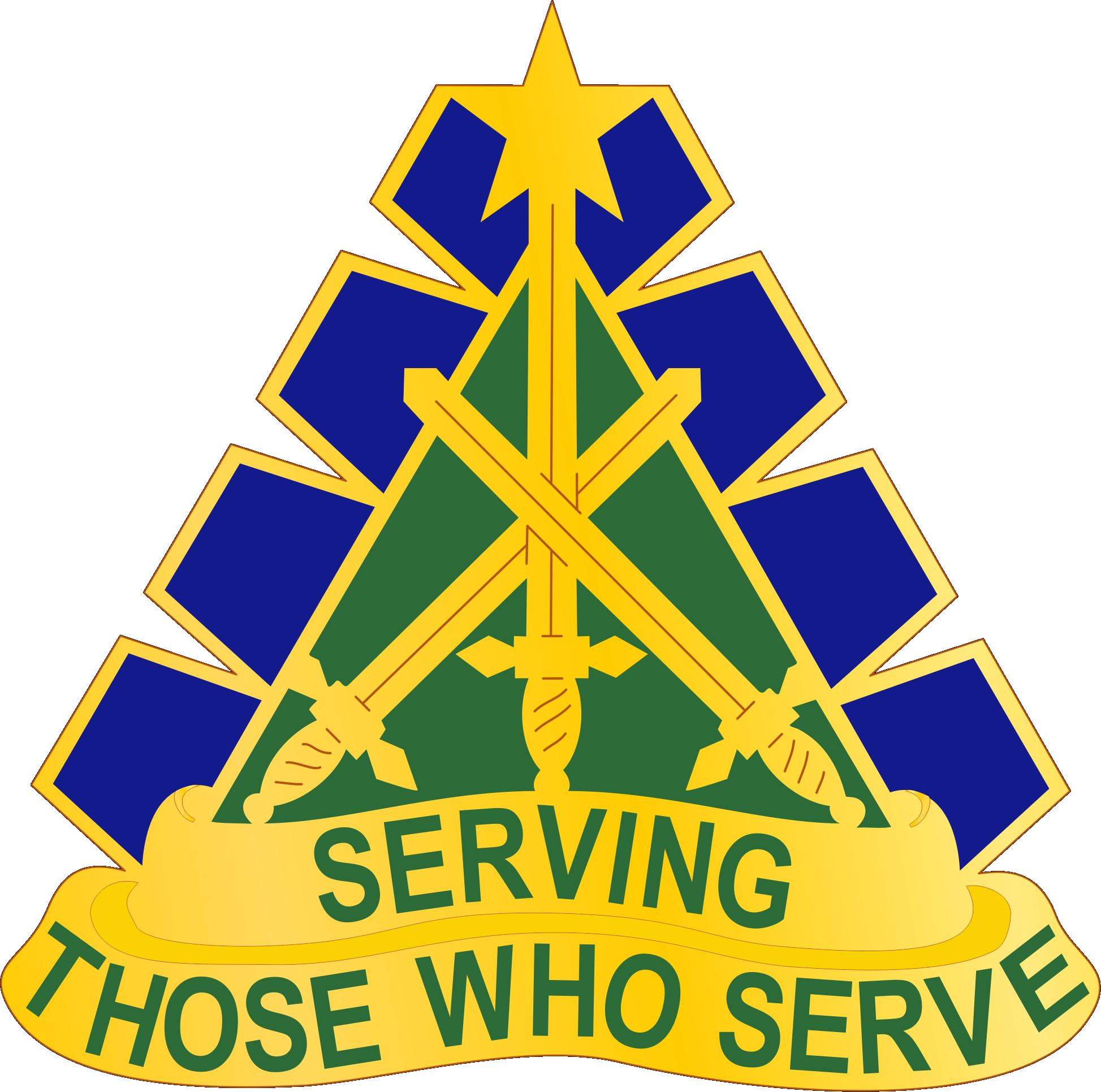
- 168th Military Police Battalion distinctive unit insignia
- Active: 1968–
- Country: United States
- Branch: Army National Guard
- Type: Military Police
- Role: Combat Support
- Size: Battalion
- Part of: Tennessee Army National Guard
- Battalion Headquarters: Dyersburg, Tennessee
- Nickname: Titans
- Motto: "Serving those who serve"
- Engagements: Operation Iraqi Freedom
- Decorations: Valorous Unit Award, Streamer embroidered IRAQ 2003–2004 Meritorious Unit Commendation, Streamer embroidered IRAQ 2008–2009

Commanders
- Battalion Commander: LTC Robert E Crowley
- Command Sergeant Major: CSM Brian M Goode

The 168th Military Police Battalion (CS) is a military police battalion of the United States Army based in Dyersburg, Tennessee. It is a subordinate unit of 194th Engineer Brigade and the Tennessee Army National Guard.

== Missions ==
- State Mission

On Order and in conjunction with State and local government agencies, provide logistical services, life support, and protection of human life in response to natural or man-made disasters.

- Federal Mission

On Order, the 168th Military Police Battalion (CS) mobilizes and deploys to a contingency area and provides Command, Control and Coordination for the MP elements assigned or attached.

== Battalion lineage ==
- Organized and Federally recognized 18 April 1932 in the Tennessee National Guard as Company I, 117th Infantry, an element of the 30th Division (subsequently the 30th Infantry Division) at Dyersburg, Tennessee
- Inducted into Federal service 16 September 1940 at Dyersburg
- Inactivated 17 November 1945 at Fort Jackson, South Carolina
- Expanded, reorganized, and Federally recognized 15 July 1947 as Headquarters Company, 3rd Battalion, 117th Infantry, and Company I, 117th Infantry, elements of the 30th Infantry Division, at Dyersburg, Tennessee
- Headquarters Company, 3rd Battalion and Company I, 117th Infantry, consolidated, reorganized and redesignated 27 October 1954 as Headquarters and Service Company, 117th Armored Infantry Battalion, an element of the 30th Armored Division
- Reorganized and redesignated 27 October 1954 as Headquarters and Service Company, 117th Armored Infantry Battalion, an element of the 30th Armored Division
- Reorganized and redesignated 1 March 1959 as Headquarters and Headquarters Company, 3rd Armored Rifle Battalion, 117th Infantry, an element of the 30th Armored Division
- Reorganized and redesignated 1 April 1963 as Headquarters and Headquarters Company, 3rd Battalion, 117th Infantry
- Converted and redesignated 1 February 1968 as Headquarters and Headquarters Detachment, 168th Military Police Battalion; concurrently relieved from assignment to the 30th Armored Division
- Ordered into active Federal Service 15 March 2003; released from active Federal service 13 November 2004 and reverted to state control
- Ordered into active Federal Service 22 October 2008; released from active Federal service 8 October 2009 and reverted to state control.

== Distinctive unit insignia ==
- Description:

A gold color metal and enamel device 1 and 1/8 inches in height overall consisting of three gold swords, hilts to base, one vertical between two crossed saltirewise, extending over the top of a green equilateral triangle pointed up and base concavely arched, and extending from the horizontal arms of a gold star at the apex above the sword a series of blue truncated pyramids with tops outward and forming a border on the left and right terminating at the sides of a gold scroll curved across the base inscribed "Serving," all above a longer parallel gold scroll inscribed "Those Who Serve."

- Symbolism:

The organization served as Infantry in World War II. Blue, the color for Infantry is also the color of the Presidential Unit Citation streamer awarded the unit for action in penetrating the Siegfried Line, symbolized by the truncated pyramids simulating tank obstacles ("Dragon's Teeth"). The gold swords over the truncated pyramids denote the French and Belgian awards. The five points of the star allude to the unit's participation in five campaigns, World War II, the colors green and yellow (gold) are used for the Military Police Corps.

- Background: The distinctive unit insignia was approved on 1972-01-21.

== Honors ==
=== Campaign participation credit ===
==== World War II ====
- Normandy
- Northern France
- Rhineland
- Ardennes-Alsace
- Central Europe

==== Global War on Terror ====
- Iraq 2003–2004
- Iraq 2008–2009
- Iraq 2020-2021
- Mexican Border 2024-2025

=== Decorations ===
- Presidential Unit Citation (Army), Streamer embroidered Ubach (3rd Bn/117th Inf cited)
- French Croix de Guerre with Palm, World War II, Streamer embroidered FRANCE (117th Inf cited)
- French Croix de Guerre with Silver Star, World War II, Streamer embroidered SCHERPENSEEL (117th Inf cited)
- Belgian Fourragere 1940 (117th Inf cited)
- Citied in the Order of the Day of the Belgian Army for action in BELGIUM (Companies I&K/117th Inf cited)
- Valorous Unit Award, Streamer embroidered IRAQ 2003–2004
- Meritorious Unit Commendation, Streamer embroidered IRAQ 2008–2009
