= 30th Armored Division (United States) =

- Shoulder sleeve insignia
- Active: 1954–73
- Country: United States
- Branch: United States Army
- Type: Armored
- Nickname: Volunteers

Commanders
- Notable commanders: MG Hugh Mott

Insignia
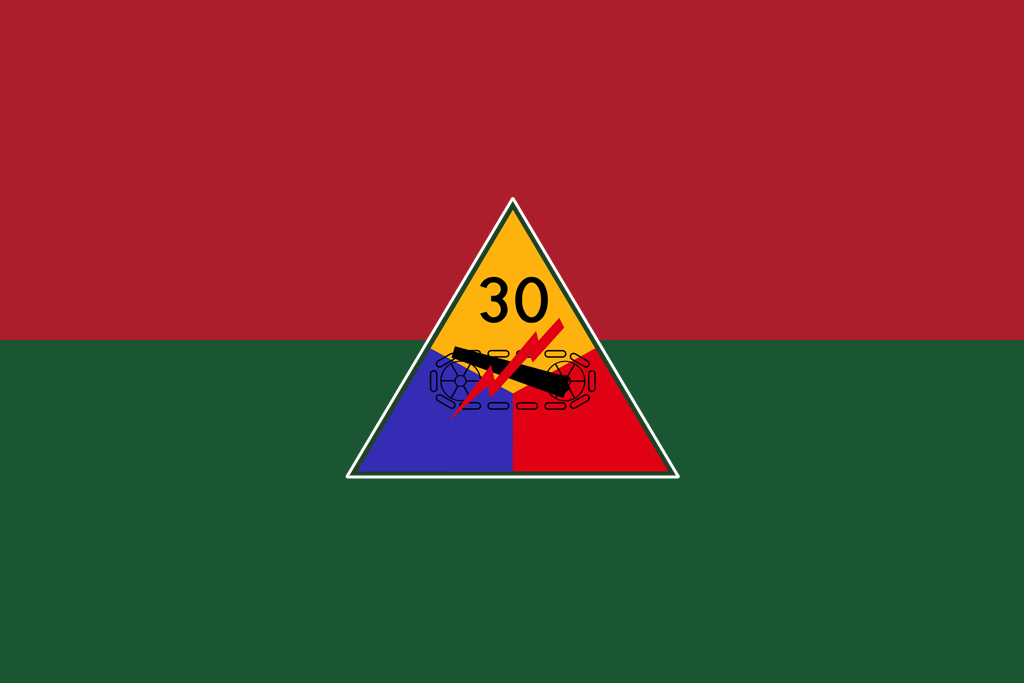
- Flag of the United States Army 30th Armored Division

The 30th Armored Division was a Tennessee-based unit of the Army National Guard from the 1950s to the 1970s.

== Activation and service ==
In 1954 the 30th Infantry Division was reorganized, with units in North Carolina and South Carolina constituting the 30th Infantry Division, and units in Tennessee forming the nucleus of the new 30th Armored Division.

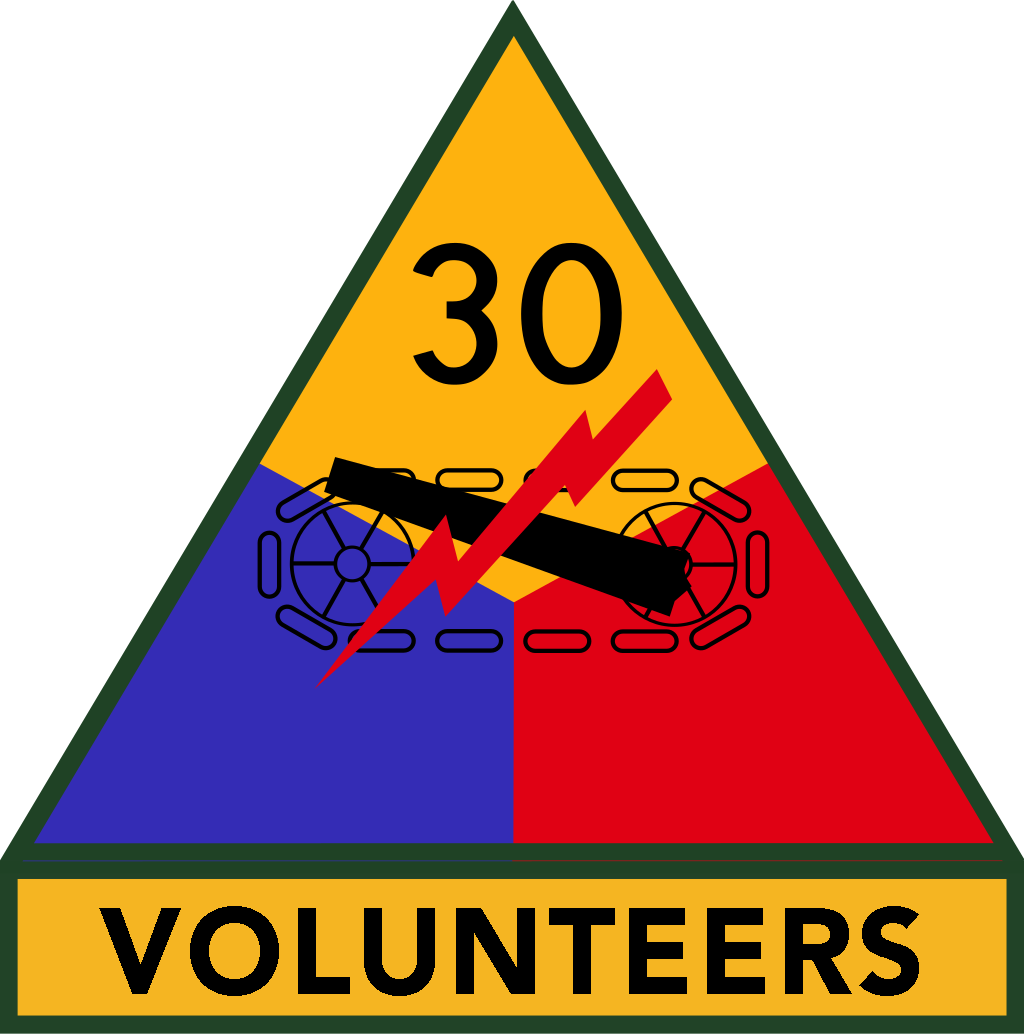
Unauthorized Nickname SSI

Though never federalized during wartime, the 30th Armored Division (called "Volunteers," for Tennessee's "Volunteer State" nickname) was activated for support to law enforcement, including responses to civil disturbances in Memphis and Nashville after the assassination of Martin Luther King Jr.

In 1968 the headquarters of the Mississippi Army National Guard's 108th Armored Cavalry Regiment was reorganized as 1st Brigade, 30th Armored Division. (The brigade was subsequently designated the 155th Separate Armored Brigade.) In addition, in 1968, units from the Florida Army National Guard and Alabama Army National Guard formerly part of the 31st Infantry Division also became part of the 30th Armored Division.

The 30th Armored Division was inactivated in December, 1973.

== Commanders ==
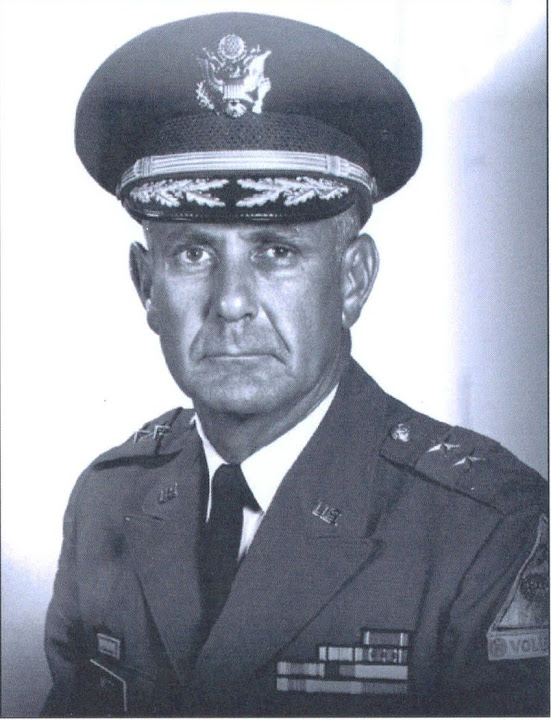
Hugh B. Mott as commander of 30th Armored Division.

The following officers served as commander of the 30th Armored Division:

- MG Paul H. Jordan, 1954-1957
- MG Robert E. Frankland, 1957-1959
- MG Warren C. Giles, 1959-1962
- MG Clarence B. Johnson, 1962-1963
- MG William R. Douglas, 1963-1966
- MG Thomas G. Wells Jr., 1966-1968
- MG Hugh B. Mott, 1968-1969
- MG Glynn C. Ellison, 1969-1971
- MG Carl M. Lay, 1971-1973
- MG John M. Calhoun, 1973

== Lineage ==
During its existence the 30th Armored Division was never deployed as an organization, and received no combat honors. Several members volunteered individually to join regular Army units during the Vietnam War.

The 30th Armored Division's lineage was carried by the Tennessee Army National Guard's 30th Armored Brigade until the brigade's inactivation in 1996.
