= Donald J. Strait =

United States Air Force general

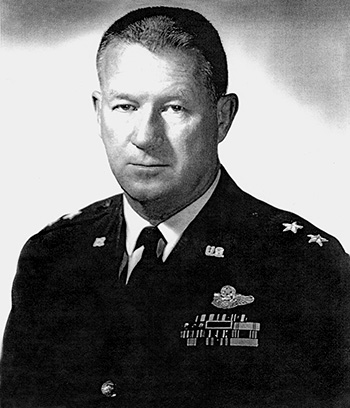
- Born: April 28, 1918; East Orange, New Jersey, U.S.
- Died: March 30, 2015 (aged 96); Pinehurst, North Carolina
- Military career
- Allegiance: United States of America
- Branch: United States Army Air Forces; United States Air Force; New Jersey Air National Guard
- Service years: 1940–1976
- Rank: Major General
- Nickname: "The Jersey Jerk"
- Unit: 356th Fighter Group
- Commands: 361st Fighter Squadron; 119th Fighter Squadron; 108th Fighter Group; 108th Fighter Wing; 108th Fighter-Bomber Group; 108th Tactical Fighter Wing; New Jersey Air National Guard
- Conflicts: World War II
- Awards: Silver Star; Legion of Merit; Distinguished Flying Cross (3); Air Medal (15); Department of the Air Force Decoration for Exceptional Civilian Service

Donald Jackson Strait (April 28, 1918 – March 30, 2015) was a major general who served as a career officer in the United States Air Force and was a flying ace with the 356th Fighter Group during World War II.

== Early life and education ==
Strait was born in East Orange, New Jersey, on April 28, 1918, and was raised in Verona, New Jersey. He played prep baseball at Verona High School, graduating in 1936.

In his teens, Strait had an interest in model aircraft and would ride his bicycle 8 miles (13 km) to the Caldwell Wright Airport, where he would watch the planes flying and speak to pilots and workers at the facility. He went to work for Public Service Electric and Gas and then Prudential Insurance after graduating from high school.

== Military career ==
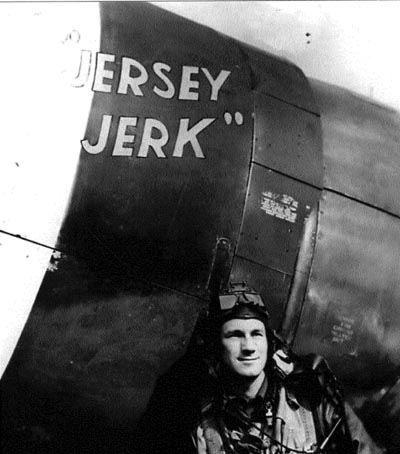
Strait standing next to his plane the "Jersey Jerk"

He enlisted with the New Jersey National Guard in 1940, serving with the 119th Observer Squadron, flying observation planes. He entered the United States Army's aviation cadet program in 1942. Commissioned as a second lieutenant in the United States Army Air Force, he completed his training in March 1943 on the P-47 Thunderbolt in Connecticut. Assigned to combat duty in England, he flew with the 356th Fighter Group, flying his first mission in October 1943 in a P-47 Thunderbolt he named the "Jersey Jerk", a reference to the state where he grew up, after finding that the name he had wanted, Jersey Bounce, was already taken; Reluctant to include the word "Jerk" in the name of his plane, he relented after his crew chief told him "Sir, let me tell you why we want to name it that. Any guy that would take off in a single engine airplane, cross the North Sea in the wintertime and take a chance of getting his ass shot off by the Luftwaffe or by anti-aircraft fire has got to be a jerk." He later gave the same name to his newest plane the P-51 Mustang. Based at Martlesham Heath Airfield, he was awarded the Silver Star. He was assigned to lead the 361st Squadron in October 1944 and continues in that role for the remainder of the war. During World War II, he flew 122 missions and earned 13 1/2 kills (including 7 1/2 Messerschmitt Bf 109s), earning distinction as one of two National Guard pilots to achieve ace status.

He was hired by Fairchild-Republic in 1968, where he was involved in the development of the A-10 Thunderbolt II.

In 1989, Strait was recognized with induction into the Aviation Hall of Fame and Museum of New Jersey.

== Death ==
Strait died on March 30, 2015. His wife, the former Louise Lyons, died in 2001, after 55 years of marriage.
