= 118th Wing =

118th Wing

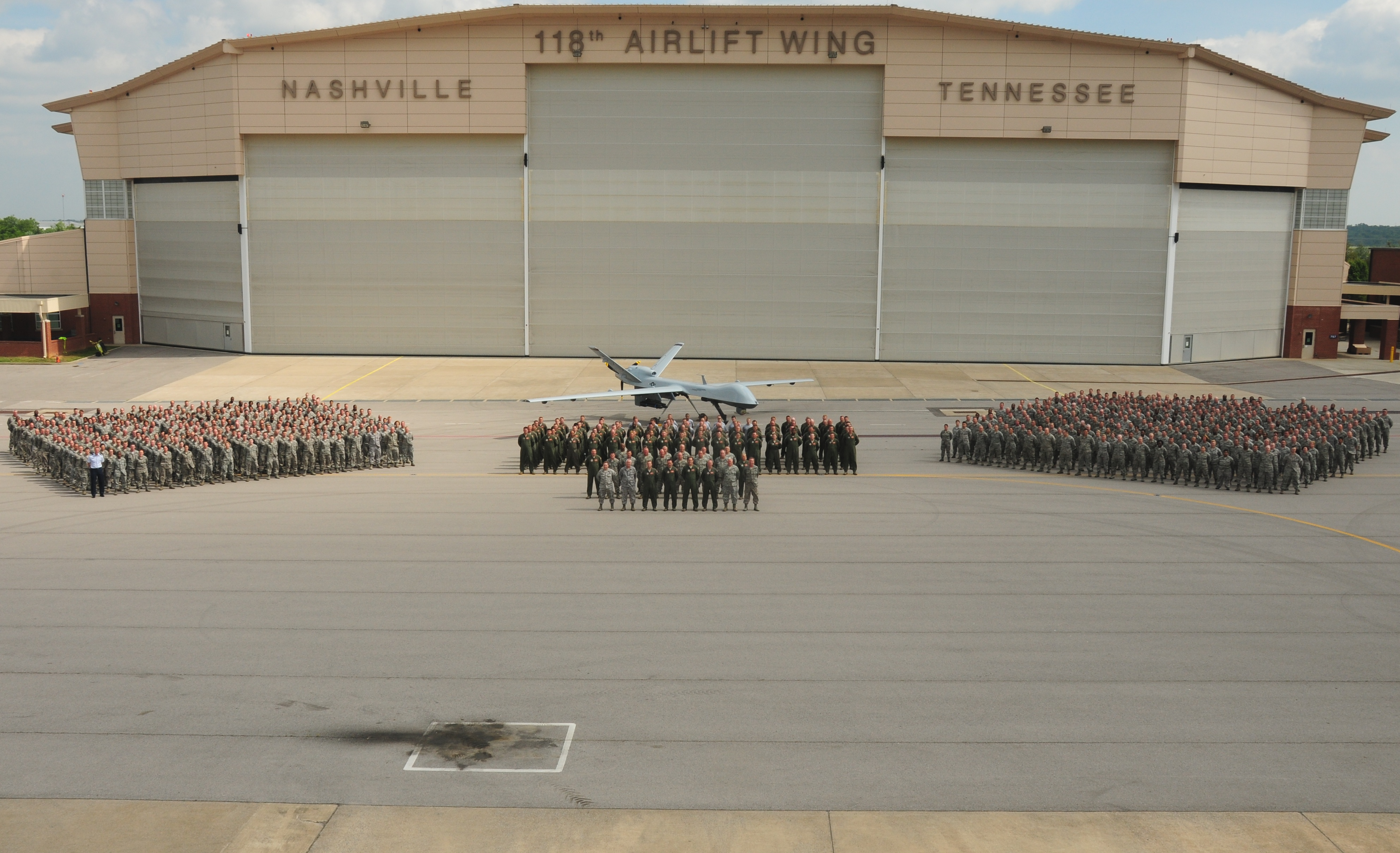
- Personnel of the 118th Wing with an MQ-9 Reaper at Berry ANGB
- Active: 1950–1953; 1953–1971; 1971–present
- Country: United States
- Allegiance: Tennessee
- Branch: Air National Guard
- Type: Wing
- Role: Intel, Cyber, Remotely Piloted Aircraft
- Part of: Tennessee Air National Guard
- Garrison/HQ: Berry Field Air National Guard Base, Nashville, Tennessee

Insignia
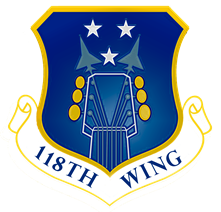
- 118th Wing emblem

- Tail stripe
- Tail code: TN

The 118th Wing is a unit of the Tennessee Air National Guard, stationed at Joint Base Berry Field, formerly Berry Field Air National Guard Base, Nashville, Tennessee. The 118th is equipped with the MQ-9 Reaper. If activated to federal service, it is gained by the United States Air Force Air Combat Command.

The 105th Attack Squadron, assigned to the wing's 118th Operations Group, is a descendant organization of the World War I 105th Aero Squadron, established on 27 August 1917. It was reformed on 4 December 1921, as the 136th Squadron (Observation), and is one of the 29 original National Guard Observation Squadrons of the United States Army National Guard formed before World War II.

== Mission ==
The 118th Wing MQ-9 Reaper Remotely Piloted Aircraft (RPA) mission is to provide close air support (CAS), air interdiction, intelligence, surveillance and reconnaissance (ISR), and attack to eliminate threats when present. The multi-role capabilities of these RPAs allows Combat Search and Rescue operations and extended time over targets to locate, track, target, strike, and assess time sensitive targets

The plan also calls for the 118th Wing to get a cyber-security unit and expand their intelligence squadron.

== Units ==
- 118th Operations Group

105th Attack Squadron - (MQ-9 Reaper)

- 118th Mission Support Group
- 118th Intelligence Surveillance and Reconnaissance Group
- 218th Intelligence Surveillance and Reconnaissance Group
- 118th Medical Group

== History ==
See 118th Operations Group for related history information

=== Tennessee Air National Guard ===
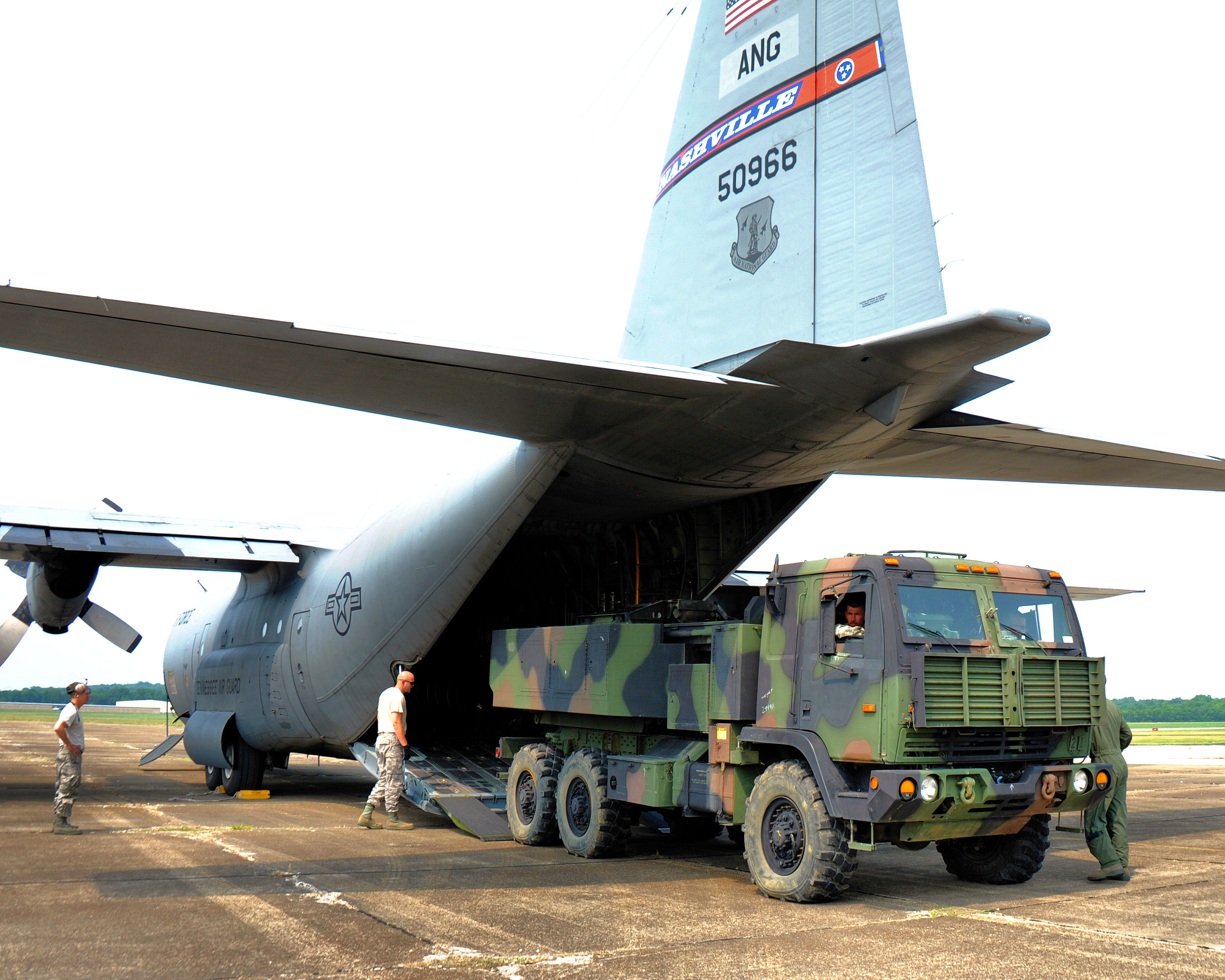
A High Mobility Artillery Rocket System (HIMARS) vehicle is loaded into one of four C-130 aircraft from the 118th Airlift Wing 4 June 2011 as the Tennessee Army National Guard's 1/181st Field Artillery Battalion headed to Fort Chaffee, Ark. for two weeks of annual training.

On 1 September 1950, wing was established as the 118th Composite Wing and activated, with wing headquarters at Berry Field. It was assigned the 118th Composite Group. On 1 February 1951, the 118th Composite Wing, 118th Composite Group and 105th Fighter Squadron were redesignated the 118th Tactical Reconnaissance Wing, Group and Squadron respectively.

The 118th Tactical Reconnaissance Wing and Group were activated for federal service 1 February 1951. On 13 April 1951, the 118th TRW was reassigned to Tactical Air Command, (TAC), Langley Air Force Base, Virginia, and operated from the municipal airport at Memphis, TN. On 3 August 1951, the 118th TRW was released from assignment to TAC and reassigned and transferred to Headquarters Ninth Air Force, Shaw Air Force Base, South Carolina.

1 January 1953, the 118th Tactical Reconnaissance Wing returned to Berry Field with the following assigned units: 118th Tactical Reconnaissance Group, 105th Tactical Reconnaissance Squadron, 155th Tactical Reconnaissance Squadron at Memphis, and the 154th Tactical Reconnaissance Squadron at Little Rock, AR. The units were equipped with the RF-51 Mustang from 1953 – 1954, the Lockheed RF-80C Shooting Star from 1954 – 1956, and the Republic RF-84F Thunderflash from 1956 to early 1961.

In April 1961 the Wing converted to an airlift mission flying the C-97G Stratofreighter. On 12 May 1961, the 118th Air Transport Wing (Heavy) was gined by Eastern Transport Air Force (EASTAF), Military Air Transport Service (MATS). In January 1966, MATS was renamed Military Airlift Command (MAC). As a result, the 118th Air Transport Wing, Group and Squadron were redesignated the 118th Military Airlift Wing, Group and Squadron. The 118th converted to the C-124C Globemaster II transport and received the first of eight of these aircraft 6 April 1967.

Operating from Nashville during the Vietnam War, the 118th MAW supported global airlift requirements of U.S. military forces. The Wing became Executive Agent for ANG Airlift Support in conjunction with the Vietnam effort in 1965. This function now resides at the Air National Guard Readiness Center at Andrews Air Force Base, Maryland. A well-trained group of officers and airmen at Berry Field operating 24 hours a day, seven days a week, coordinated the airlift of equipment and personnel by 18 Military Airlift Groups in 15 states. Beginning in December 1965, the 105th MAS flew more than 100 missions to South Vietnam in a period of approximately a year and a half.

In March 1971, the Wing converted to the C-130A Hercules aircraft and became the 118th Tactical Airlift Wing. The Wing was gained by Ninth Air Force, Tactical Air Command. Ultimately five ANG tactical airlift groups were assigned to the Wing by 9 June 1973: the 145th TAG, Charlotte, NC, the 166th TAG, New Castle, DE, the 167th TAG Martinsburg, WV, the 170th TAG, McGuire AFB, NJ, and the 118th TAG at Nashville. 1 December 1974, the 118th Tactical Airlift Wing was transferred from 9th Air Force, Tactical Air Command (TAC), to 21st Air Force, MAC On 9 February 1975, the 118th Tactical Airlift Group was inactivated. In June 1978 the Wing was recognized for its achievements and was awarded the Air Force Outstanding Unit Award. In 1979, the Wing was enlarged from eight to sixteen C-130A Aircraft.

Since acquiring the C-130 airframe, the unit has supported a worldwide tactical airlift mission. Participation in exercises such as Brave Shield, Brim Frost and Red Flag were accomplished with some of the oldest aircraft in the inventory (1954–1957 A models). Rotations to Panama in support of Volant Oak beginning in 1977 became routine.

=== Post-Cold War ===
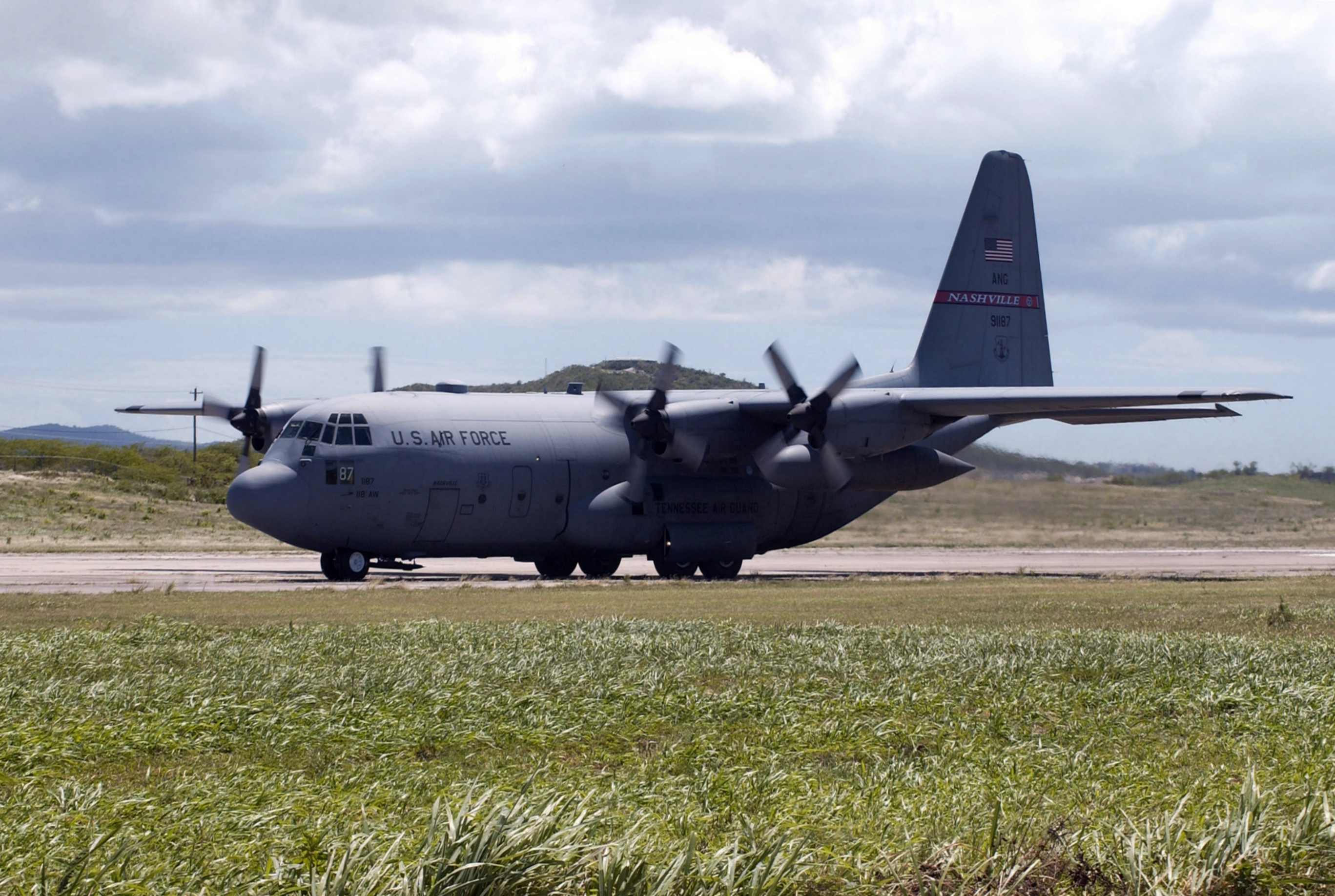
C-130 Hercules

The Wing mobilized 462 personnel during 21 deployments for Operation Desert Shield and Operation Desert Storm in southwest Asia and flew a record 7239 flying hours. In 1992, MAC was replaced by the Air Mobility Command (AMC). As a part of this reorganization, the wing became the 118th Airlift Wing. With sixteen C-130H aircraft and 1406 personnel at Nashville, the wing was one of the largest flying units in the Air National Guard at that time.

Following 11 September 2001, the operational tempo increased. Over one-third of the Wing was activated for one year or more to supporting the National Homeland Security Plan (Operation Noble Eagle), which included deploying aircraft and personnel to bases inside the United States for several months, then assigned a home station alert mission. Shortly after the Wing completed the Noble Eagle mission, the Wing was selected to deploy to Southwest Asia in support CENTCOM Operations.

=== Operation Enduring Freedom/Operation Iraqi Freedom ===
In 2003, the 118th deployed ten C-130’s and over 320 personnel to the Middle East in direct support of combat operations at the beginning of Operation Iraqi Freedom. While living in austere conditions in tents, enduring the desert heat and sand storms, the men and women of the 118th supported combat operations into and out of Baghdad and surrounding areas of Iraq. The 118th was the lead wing in establishing a bare base in support of the largest contingent of C-130’s ever based in a combat environment, over 46 C-130’s located at a single base. The unit supported CENTCOM at various locations in Iraq, Kuwait, Oman and Saudi Arabia. The unit returned home at different times in late 2003 as U.S. forces were drawn down and rotated to meet the changing requirements. In late 2003, the Wing again deployed to Uzbekistan supporting Operating Enduring Freedom in Afghanistan.

=== BRAC 2005 and the C-130 International Training Center ===
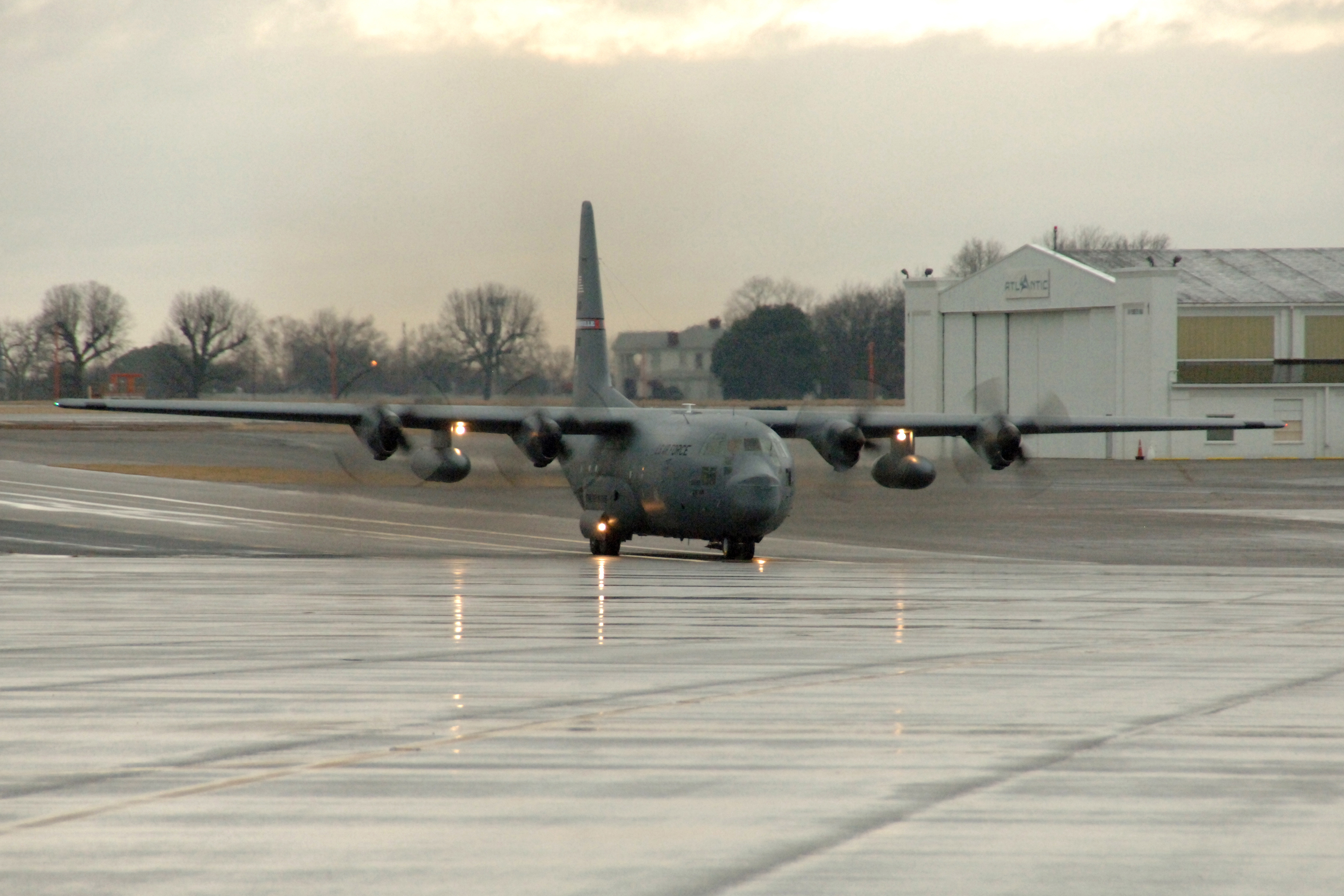
A 118th Airlift Wing WC-130H at Nashville in January 2010.

As part of BRAC 2005, the Department of Defense was recommended to realign Berry Field Air National Guard Base. This recommendation would distribute the C-130H aircraft of the 118th Airlift Wing to the 182d Airlift Wing of the Illinois Air National Guard at Greater Peoria Airport Air National Guard Station, IL (four aircraft), and the 123d Airlift Wing of the Kentucky Air National Guard at Louisville IAP Air National Guard Station, KY (four aircraft). Flying related ECS (aerial port and fire fighters) would move to Memphis Air National Guard Base and the aeromedical squadron from Nashville would move to NAS JRB Fort Worth, TX. Other ECS would remain in place at Nashville. Nashville had a low military value ranking and was near other ANG bases keeping or gaining aircraft.

In October 2007, it was announced that as an amendment to the BRAC 2005 decision, the 118 AW would continue to retain a flying mission, transitioning from an AMC-gained unit to that of a training organization operationally gained by the Air Education and Training Command (AETC). As the C-130 International Training Center, the 118 AW assumed a new role in support of DoD Foreign Military Sales, training up to 150 international military C-130E and C-130H flight crew and maintenance students annually. Although its C-130H2 aircraft were transferred to other Air National Guard airlift wings, the 118 AW did gain six WC-130H aircraft that had been retired from weather reconnaissance duties with the Air Force Reserve Command's 403d Wing at Keesler Air Force Base, Mississippi. The first class of international C-130 students (from Poland) trained by the 118 AW graduated in October 2008.

Shortly after transitioning to the C-130 International Training Center, the 118th Airlift Wing was again reorganized as the 118th Wing.

=== Unmanned aerial vehicle operations ===
The 118th is now tasked with supporting global unmanned aircraft intelligence, surveillance, and reconnaissance operations. The wing converted to MQ-9 Reaper Remotely Piloted Aircraft during 2012.

== Lineage ==
118th Military Airlift Wing

- Constituted as the 118th Composite Wing in October 1950

Activated on 1 November 1950
Redesignated 118th Tactical Reconnaissance Wing on 1 February 1951
Ordered to active duty on 1 April 1951
Inactivated on 1 January 1953
Activated in the Air National Guard on 1 January 1953
Redesignated 118th Air Transport Wing, Heavy on 1 April 1961
Redesignated 118th Military Airlift Wing on 1 January 1966
Inactivated on 25 March 1971
Consolidated with the 118th Tactical Airlift Wing as the 118th Tactical Airlift Wing on 18 August 1987

118th Wing
Constituted as the 118th Tactical Airlift Wing on 1 March 1971
Activated on 25 March 1971
Consolidated with the 118th Military Airlift Wing on 18 August 1987
Redesignated 118th Airlift Wing on 16 March 1992
Redesignated 118th Wing on 1 September 2012

=== Assignments ===
- Tennessee Air National Guard, 1 October 1950
- Fourteenth Air Force, 1 April 1951
- Tactical Air Command, 12 April 1951
- Ninth Air Force, August 1951 – 1 January 1953
- Tennessee Air National Guard, 1 January 1953 – 25 March 1971
- Tennessee Air National Guard, 25 March 1971 – present

Gained by: Tactical Air Command
Gained by: Military Air Transport Service, 1 April 1961
Gained by: Military Airlift Command, 8 January 1966
Gained by: Tactical Air Command, 1 March 1971
Gained by: Military Airlift Command, 1 December 1973
Gained by: Air Mobility Command, 1 June 1992
Gained by: Air Education and Training Command, 1 June 2007 – September 2012
Gained by: Air Combat Command, September 2012

=== Components ===
- 118th Composite Group (later 118th Tactical Reconnaissance Group, 118th Air Transport Group, 118th Military Airlift Group, 118th Tactical Airlift Group, 118th Operations Group, 1 November 1950 – 1 January 1953, 1 January 1953-25 March 1971, 25 March 1971 – 26 February 1975, 1 January 1993 – present,
- 145th Tactical Airlift (later Airlift) Group, 15 May 1971 – 1 October 1995 (GSU at Charlotte, NC)
- 164th Air Transport (later Military Airlift, Tactical Airlift, Airlift) Group, 1 April 1961 – 1 October 1995 (GSU at Memphis TN)
- 166th Tactical Airlift (later Airlift) Group, 12 May 1971 – 10 January 1995 (GSU at New Castle, DE)
- 167th Tactical Airlift (later Airlift) Group, 1 July 1972 – 1 October 1995, (GSU at Martinsburg, WV)
- 170th Tactical Airlift Group, 1 July 1973 – 1 April 1977, (GSU at McGuire AFB, NJ)
- 105th Tactical Airlift Squadron, 26 February 1975 – 1 January 1993
- 236th Intelligence Squadron, 2009 – present

=== Stations ===
- Westover Field, Massachusetts, 12 December 1942
- Groton Army Airfield, Connecticut, 11 March 1943
- Mitchel Field, New York, 30 May 1943
- Grenier Field, New Hampshire, 4 Jul-19 Aug 1943
- RAF Goxhill (AAF-345), England, 26 August 1943
- RAF Martlesham Heath (AAF-359), England, 12 Oct 1943 – 4 Nov 1945
- Camp Kilmer, New Jersey, 9–10 Nov 1945
- Berry Field, Nashville, Tennessee, 2 October 1947
- Memphis Municipal Airport, Tennessee, 12 April 1951
- Shaw Air Force Base, South Carolina, 15 January 1952 – 1 January 1953
- Berry Field, Tennessee, 1 January 1953 – 25 March 1971
- Berry Field, Tennessee, 25 March 1971 – present

Designated: Berry Field Air National Guard Base, 199

=== Aircraft ===
- F-51D Mustang, 1953–1955
- RF-80A Shooting Star, 1954–1956
- RF-84F Thunderflash, 1956–1961
- C-97G Stratofreighter, 1961–1967
- C-124C Globemaster II, 1967–1971
- C-130A Hercules, 1971–1990
- C-130H Hercules, 1990–2008
- WC-130H Hercules, 2008–2012
- MQ-9 Reaper, 2012–Present

=== Operations and decorations ===
- Combat Operations: World War II
- Campaigns:

Air Offensive, Europe
Normandy
Northern France
Rhineland
Ardennes-Alsace
Central Europe
Operation Volant & Operation Coronet Oak- airlift support for SOUTHCOM in Central & South America
Operation Brim Frost – airlift support to Alaska in 1985, 1987, 1989
Operation Arctic Warrior – airlift support to Alaska, early 1990s
Operation Amalgam Warrior – airlift support to Alaska, late 1990s
Operation Amalgam Virgo – airlift support to Alaska, late 1990s
Operation Creek Resolve – airlift support in Turkey
Operation Desert Shield & Operation Desert Storm – deployments of Forces in support of CENTCOM in Southwest Asia

Operation Distant Haven – humanitarian operations for Haitian refugees in Suriname
Operation Provide Relief – humanitarian airlift into Somalia
Operation Provide Promise – airlift into Sarajevo and airdrops over Bosnia
Operation Support Hope – humanitarian operations in or near Rwanda
Operation Uphold Democracy – supporting military forces in Haiti
Operation Southern Watch – enforcing the no-fly zone over southern Iraq
Operation Joint Guard – supporting peacekeeping operations in Yugoslavia
Operation Joint Endeavor – supporting peacekeeping operations in Bosnia
Operation Noble Eagle – supporting the National Homeland Security Plan
Operation Enduring Freedom – deployment of forces in support of CENTCOM
Operation Iraqi Freedom – deployment of forces in support of CENTCOM operations in Iraq

- Decorations:

Air Force Outstanding Unit Award
