= Georgetown County Airport =

Airport in South Carolina

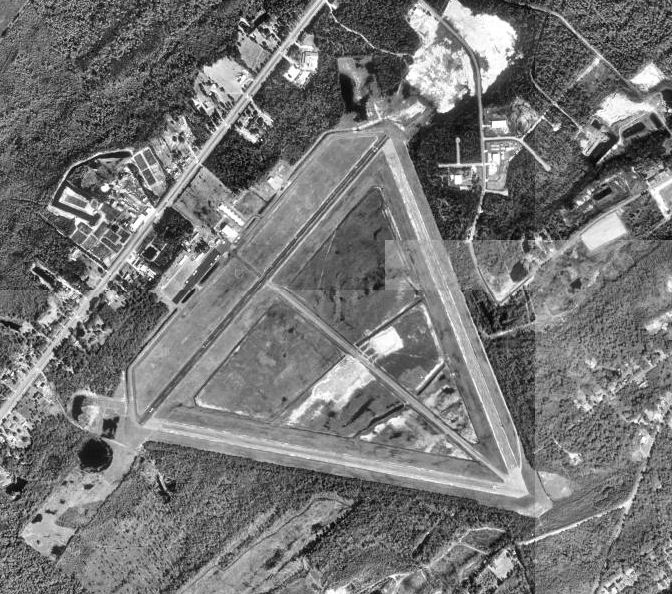
- USGS 1995 orthophoto
- IATA: GGE; ICAO: KGGE; FAA LID: GGE

Summary
- Airport type: Public
- Owner: Georgetown County
- Serves: Georgetown, South Carolina
- Elevation AMSL: 40 ft (12 m)
- Coordinates: 33°18′41″N 79°19′13″W

Map
- Location of airport in South Carolina

Runways
Direction	Length		Surface
Direction	ft	m	Surface
5/23	6,000	1,829	Asphalt
11/29	4,539	1,383	Asphalt

Statistics (2012)
- Aircraft operations: 48,000
- Based aircraft: 31
- Source: Federal Aviation Administration

Georgetown County Airport (IATA: GGE, ICAO: KGGE, FAA LID: GGE) is a county-owned, public-use airport located three nautical miles (6 km) south of the central business district of Georgetown, a city in Georgetown County, South Carolina, United States. It is included in the National Plan of Integrated Airport Systems for 2011–2015, which categorized it as a general aviation facility. The airport does not have scheduled commercial airline service.

== History ==
Georgetown airport was built in 1941 by the United States Navy and was used by the United States Marine Corps during World War II as an auxiliary airfield assigned to Parris Island Airfield. Georgetown Marine Corps Airfield (OLF) was also used by the United States Army Air Force light observation squadrons (105th, 112th) flying antisubmarine patrols over the Atlantic from May 1942 until August 1942.

The airport was turned over to civil authorities in June 1944, and it was developed into a public airport

== Facilities and aircraft ==
Georgetown County Airport covers an area of 680 acres (275 ha) at an elevation of 40 feet (12 m) above mean sea level. It has two asphalt paved runways: 5/23 is 6,000 by 100 feet (1,829 x 30 m) and 11/29 is 4,539 by 150 feet (1,383 x 46 m).

For the 12-month period ending February 22, 2012, the airport had 48,000 aircraft operations, an average of 131 per day: 97% general aviation, 2% air taxi, and 1% military. At that time there were 31 aircraft based at this airport: 77% single-engine, 16% multi-engine, and 7% jet.

== See also ==
- South Carolina World War II Army Airfields
- List of airports in South Carolina
