= 105th Attack Squadron =

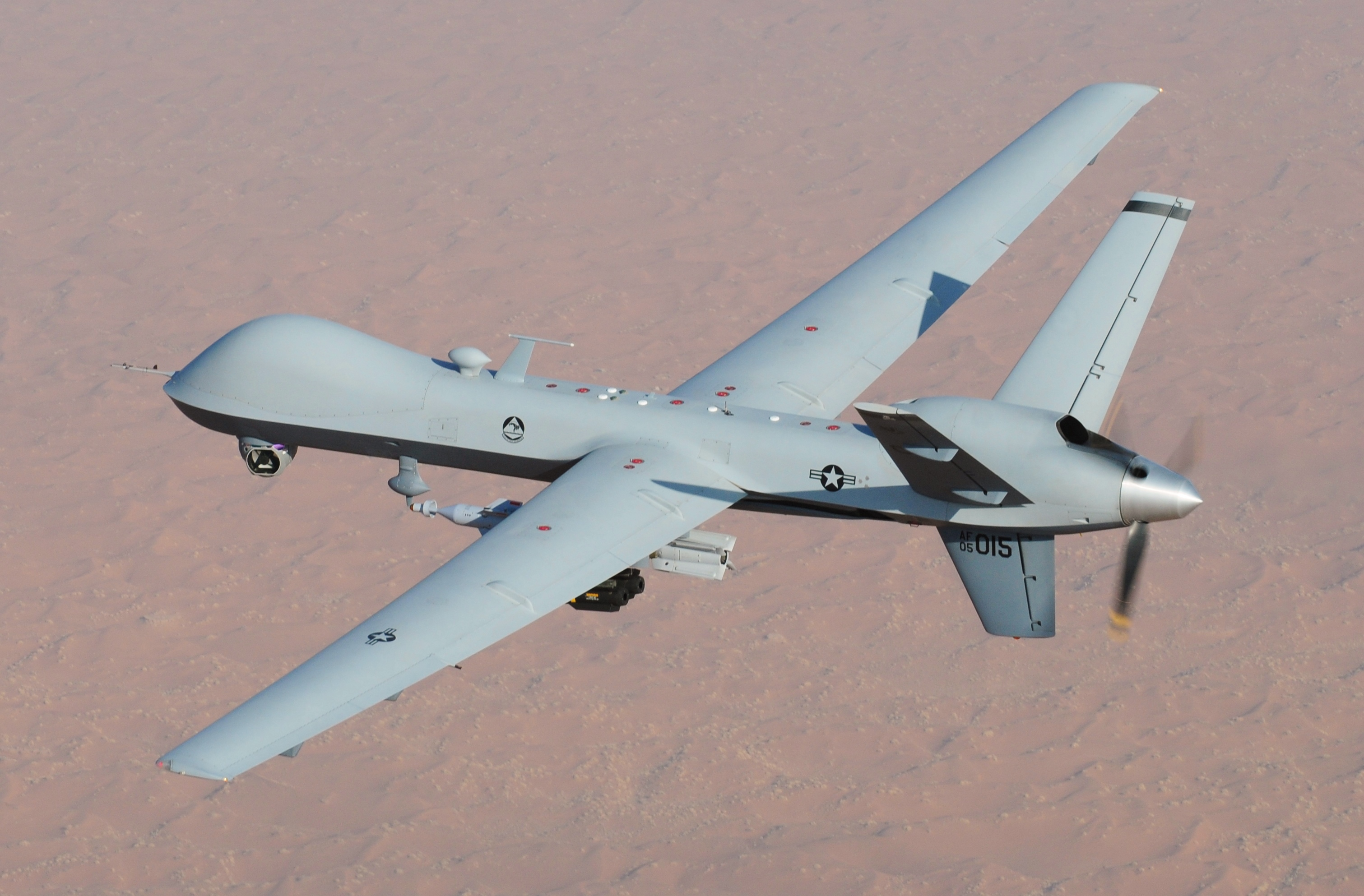
- U.S. Air Force MQ-9A Reaper
- Active: 27 August 1917-Present
- Country: United States
- Allegiance: Tennessee
- Branch: Air National Guard
- Type: Squadron
- Role: long-endurance, high-altitude surveillance, hunter-killer UAV
- Part of: Tennessee Air National Guard
- Garrison/HQ: Berry Field Air National Guard Base, Nashville, Tennessee
- Tail Code: Dark Red tail stripe, "Nashville" in white letters

Insignia
- 105th Airlift Squadron emblem

Aircraft flown
- Attack: MQ-9 Reaper

The 105th Attack Squadron (105 ATKS) is a unit of the Tennessee Air National Guard 118th Wing (118 WG). It is assigned to Berry Field Air National Guard Base in Nashville, Tennessee, and was previously equipped with the C-130H Hercules aircraft. It has since transitioned to the MQ-9 Reaper, with its parent organization, the former 118th Airlift Wing (118 AW), having recently been redesignated as the 118th Wing. The 105th has been redesignated as the 105th Attack Squadron (105 ATKS).

The squadron is a descendant organization of the World War I 105th Aero Squadron, established on 27 August 1917. It was reformed on 4 December 1921, as the 105th Observation Squadron, and is one of the 29 original National Guard Observation Squadrons of the United States Army National Guard formed before World War II.

== History ==
=== World War I ===
The 105th Airlift Squadron traces its origins to 27 August 1917 with the organization of the 105th Aero Squadron at Kelly Field, Texas. There, the squadron was assigned to indoctrination training, with the men taken up by drills, hikes, physical training and other exercises. Also the men attended various lectures about military courtesies and customs. In late October, the 105th received orders for overseas duty, and was transferred to the Aviation Concentration Center, Garden City, Long Island. It arrived at Mineola Field on 4 November 1917 where it was prepared and equipped for overseas duty. On 22 November the squadron was transferred to the New York Port of Embarkation, Hoboken, New Jersey, where it boarded the former White Star Liner RMS Baltic for the trans-Atlantic crossing. After an uneventful voyage, the squadron arrived in Liverpool, England on 8 December.

Upon arrival in England, the squadron was transferred to a Rest Camp near Winchester, where three weeks were spent waiting for movement orders. Finally, on 23 December, orders were received to proceed to France, arriving in Le Havre on Christmas Day. From Le Havre, the squadron was ordered to proceed to Air Service Supply Depot #1, Clichy, Hauts-de-Seine, near Paris. The depot grew to be the largest supply and equipment depot in the AEF.

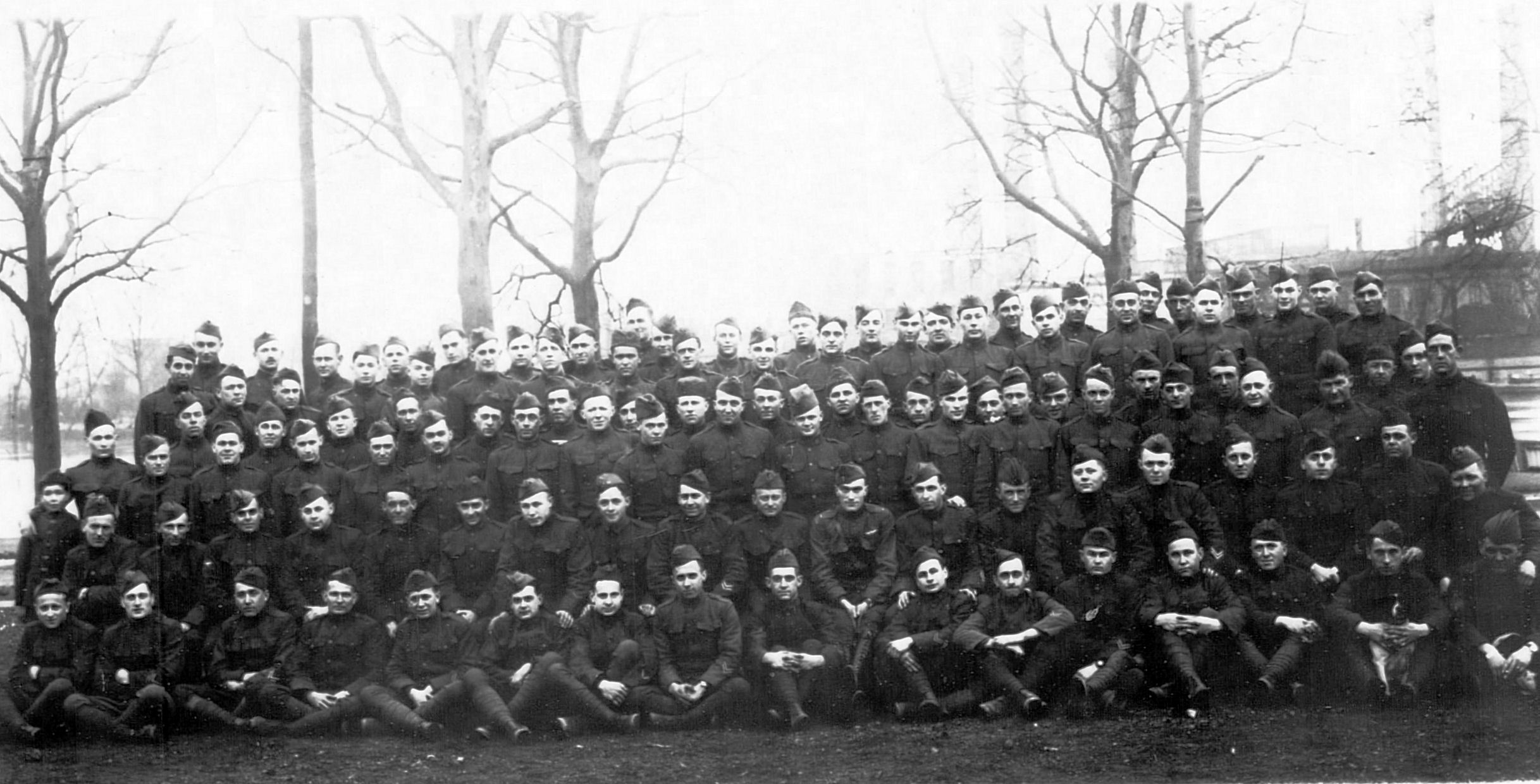
105th Aero Squadron, Air Service Supply Depot #1, Clichy, Hauts-de-Seine, France, November 1918.

It was there that the squadron experienced its first exposure to combat, when the Germans attacked with an air raid on 30 January 1918. A memorable date was on 15 March when the very earth itself trembled with a shock. News came that the largest munitions factory in France had blown up. This factory was at nearby La Courneuve. Personnel from the squadron marched to the town to help, and upon arrival the town was still filled with a cloud of smoke. Also the town was nothing but a ruined mass of buildings. Unexploded shells were numerous and the ground was also covered completely by unexploded hand grenades. The men of the squadron did their best to find the injured bodies and also to keep an eager crowd of people back from the still exploding shells, while others assisted in loading a large bunch of airplane engines that were to be taken to the Depot for storage. Not long afterwards, the reports of the German "Big Bertha" long range artillery gun shelling Paris began, and during the day the squadron could hear the sounds of artillery at the front. Also the squadron saw the night air raids by German bombers over Paris.

However, despite the danger, Clichy was much less dangerous than serving at the front lines. Regular work proceeded as usual, broken from time to time with leaves to Paris. The squadron remained at the Depot until after the Armistice with Germany in November 1918. It returned to the United States in late April 1918. Arrived at Mitchel Field, New York, where the squadron members were demobilized and returned to civilian life.

=== Tennessee National Guard ===
On 1 October 1920, Adjutant General Baxter Sweeney gave formal recognition to the First Squadron, Air Service, Tennessee National Guard. Tennessee's unit was the first in the entire South. Only two similar units existed in the country at the time, one in California and one in New York.

Veterans began recruiting efforts and conducting drills (without pay). They raised funds ($3,000) and H.O. Blackwood donated a farm adjacent to Andrew Jackson's Hermitage. The farm was converted to a 100-acre flying site complete with a World War I hangar moved from Memphis and was known as Blackwood Field. On 4 December 1921, the unit received federal recognition and was designated the 136th Air Observation Squadron, flying four new Curtiss JN-6HG "Jennys" and one DH-4B DeHavilland aircraft.

On 20 July 1923, the 136th Observation Squadron was redesignated as the 105th Observation Squadron. In the next fifteen years the Squadron developed strength and stature. It received O-2 observation airplanes in 1926.

Beginning 29 November 1927, it occupied McConnell Field, west of downtown Nashville, named after Lt. Brewer McConnell who was killed in a training accident. The old McConnell field is the current home of Nashville's McCabe Municipal Golf Course. The years 1928 - 1938 were characterized by frequent changes in assigned aircraft. The 0-11 Falcon and 0-17 aircraft were received in 1928, 0-38 aircraft in 1931, 0-25 aircraft in 1935 and 0-47 aircraft in 1938.

On 25 November 1930, the 105th Observation Squadron was disbanded and the aircraft and equipment were moved to Memphis Municipal Airport, Memphis, TN. This was necessary in order to comply with the requirement by the Militia Bureau for National Guard air units to operate from an A-1 airport. At the time there were only two such airports in the state, Sky Harbor, near Murfreesboro, and Memphis Municipal. The squadron had been using Sky Harbor on a temporary basis for some months, but its distance from Nashville made it a less desirable National Guard port. Memphis did not have facilities at the time of the squadron's transfer and the program for supplying them faltered.

On 23 March 1931 the squadron transferred back to Nashville, at Sky Harbor, where it could share hangar space with American Airways (now American Airlines). After relocation to Sky Harbor, the Militia Bureau accepted the recommendations of the inspecting officers and again extended federal recognition to the squadron 10 April 1931.

Finally, on 1 January 1938, the squadron completed its move to its present home on a tract of land purchased by the City of Nashville. With financial assistance from the state and the Works Progress Administration (WPA), a modern airport was constructed and named Berry Field after WPA Administrator Colonel Harry S. Berry, who directed the airport construction. Today this site is known as the Nashville International Airport.

=== World War II ===
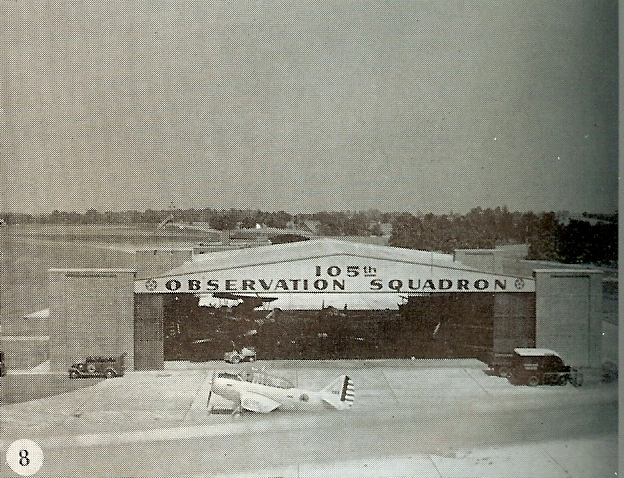
105th Airlift Observation Squadron hangar with Curtiss O-52 Owl

In September 1940, after summer maneuvers in Louisiana, the squadron was called to active duty. It was sent to Ft. Jackson, South Carolina, and assigned to the newly organized 65th Observation Group which was equipped with O-52 aircraft. Members of the 105th became a ready source of trained personnel and seasoned pilots as our nation entered World War II. The 105th was inactivated 18 October 1942, but its personnel and aircraft were absorbed into the 521st Bombardment Squadron (Heavy). Then on 29 November 1942, this organization was redesignated the 16th Antisubmarine Squadron. On 9 April 1943, the 105th Observation Squadron (Inactive) was redesignated the 105th Reconnaissance Squadron (Bombardment). The 16th Antisubmarine Squadron was redesignated the 820th Bombardment Squadron (Medium) on 24 September 1943.

Members of the 105th flew a variety of missions - observation, antisubmarine patrol, reconnaissance and bombardment. They found themselves switching organizations frequently and flying different aircraft as follows; the twin engine Martin B-10 Bomber, the Vega B-34 Ventura, the B-25G Mitchell Bomber, and the four engine B-24J Liberator Bomber.

=== Postwar formation of the Tennessee Air National Guard ===
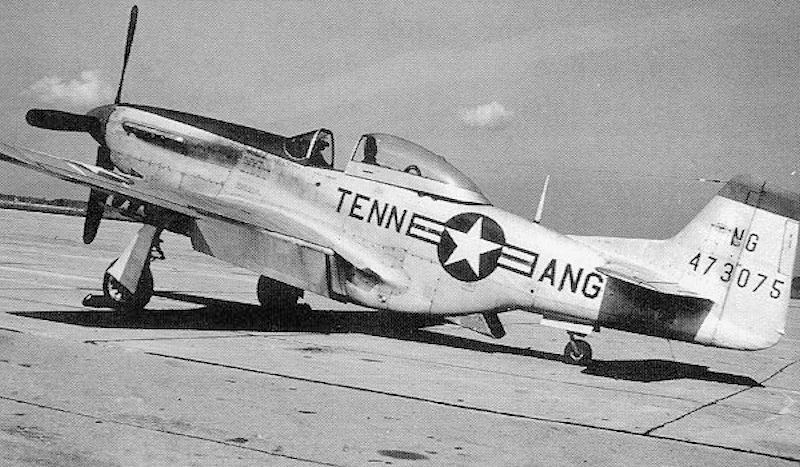
105th Fighter Squadron - North American F-51D-25-NA Mustang 44-73075

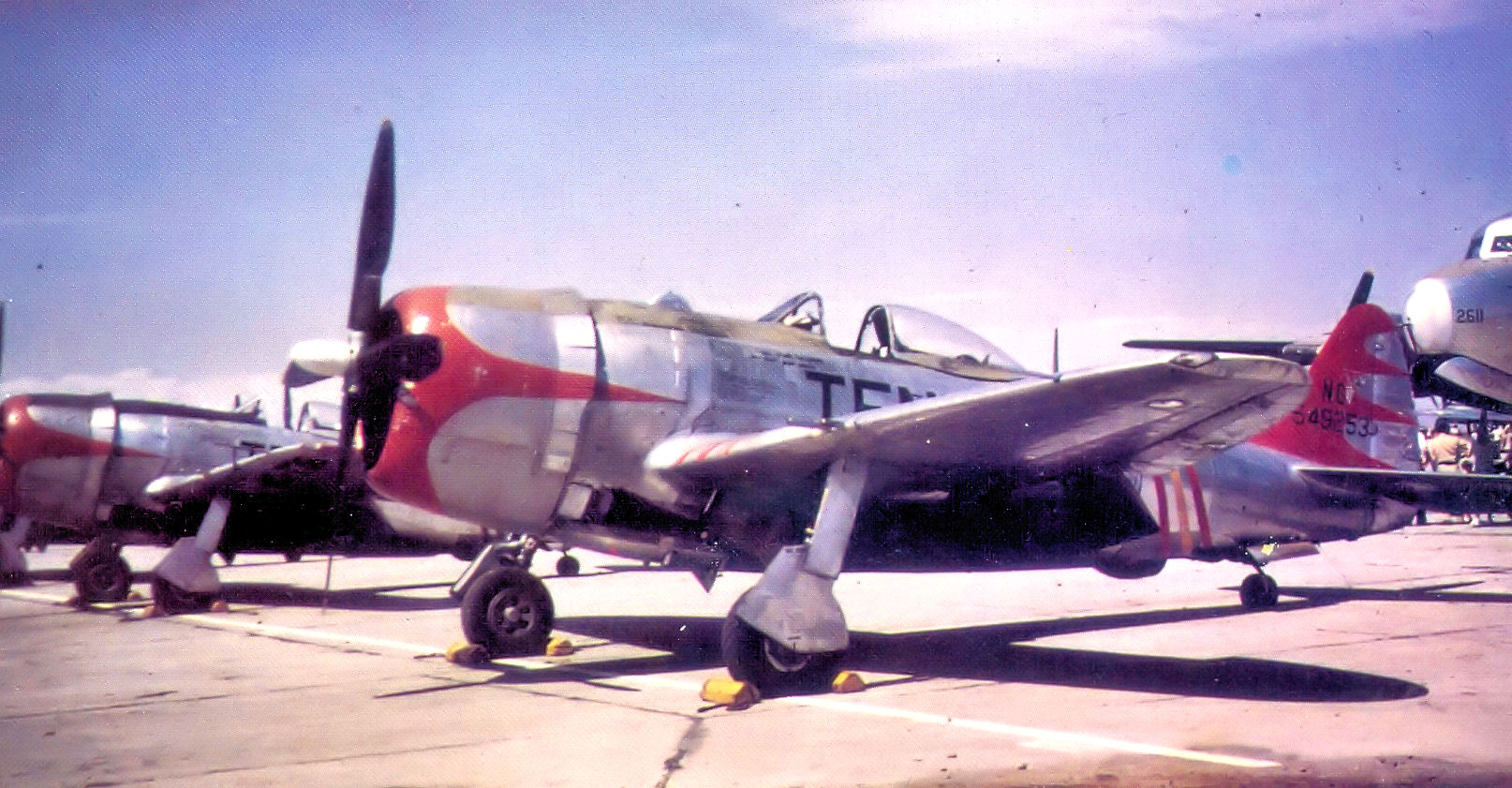
A 105th Fighter Squadron P-47N 45-49253, about 1948

In June 1945, the 105th Reconnaissance Squadron (Bombardment) was reconstituted on the inactive list. 24 May 1946, the squadron was reorganized at Berry Field and assigned to the 54th Fighter Wing, Fourteenth Air Force. 26 November 1946, the 105th Reconnaissance Squadron (B) was redesignated the 105th Fighter Squadron. 3 February 1947, the 118th Fighter Group and the 105th Fighter Squadron were federally recognized with the 105th Fighter Squadron assigned to the 118th Fighter Group flying the P-47 Thunderbolt aircraft.

On 1 September 1950, the 118th Composite Wing was constituted and on 1 November 1950, it was federally recognized. It was assigned to Fourteenth Air Force, Continental Air Command, with Wing Headquarters at Berry Field. The 118th Fighter Group was redesignated the 118th Composite Group and along with the 105th Fighter Squadron was absorbed by the 118th Composite Wing. 1 February 1951, the 118th Composite Wing, 118th Composite Group and 105th Fighter Squadron were redesignated the 118th Tactical Reconnaissance Wing, Group and Squadron respectively.

=== Korean War ===
The 105th Tactical Reconnaissance Squadron was activated for federal service 1 February 1951. The 105th Tactical Reconnaissance Squadron stayed at Berry Field. It was redesignated as the 105th Fighter Interceptor Squadron on 1 March 1951 and assigned to Air Defense Command. While on active duty, it operated two geographically separated units; Detachment 1 flying P-47 Thunderbolt aircraft, from McGhee-Tyson Airport at Knoxville, Tennessee, provided air defense for the Atomic Energy Commission at Oak Ridge, and Detachment 2 was the 4674th Ground Observer Squadron, Smyrna, Tennessee.

=== Cold War ===
On 1 January 1953 the squadron was released from Federal Service and returned to the control of the State of Tennessee. Again assigned to the 118th Tactical Reconnaissance Wing at Berry Field, The unit was equipped with the RF-51 Mustang from 1953 - 1954, the Lockheed RF-80C Shooting Star from 1954 - 1956, and the Republic RF-84F Thunderflash from 1956 to early 1961.

In April 1961 the Wing converted to an airlift mission gained by the Military Air Transport Service. It was equipped with the C-97G Stratofreighter. The 118th MAW converted to the C-124C "Globemaster" transport and received the first of eight of these aircraft 6 April 1967.

Operating from Nashville during the Vietnam War, the squadron supported global airlift requirements of U.S. military forces. A well-trained group of officers and airmen at Berry Field operating 24 hours a day, seven days a week, coordinated the airlift of equipment and personnel by 18 Military Airlift Groups in 15 states. Beginning in December 1965, the 105th MAS flew more than 100 missions to South Vietnam in a period of approximately a year and a half.

In March 1971, the Wing converted to the C-130A Hercules aircraft, and on 9 February 1975, the 118th Tactical Airlift Group was inactivated, and the 105th was assigned directly to the 118th TAW. In June 1978 the Wing was recognized for its achievements and was awarded the Air Force Outstanding Unit Award. In 1979, the squadron was enlarged from eight to sixteen C-130A Aircraft.

Since acquiring the C-130 airframe, the unit has supported a worldwide tactical airlift mission. Participation in exercises such as Brave Shield, Brim Frost and Red Flag were accomplished with some of the oldest aircraft in the inventory (1954-1957 A models). Rotations to Panama in support of Volant Oak beginning in 1977 became routine.

=== Modern era ===
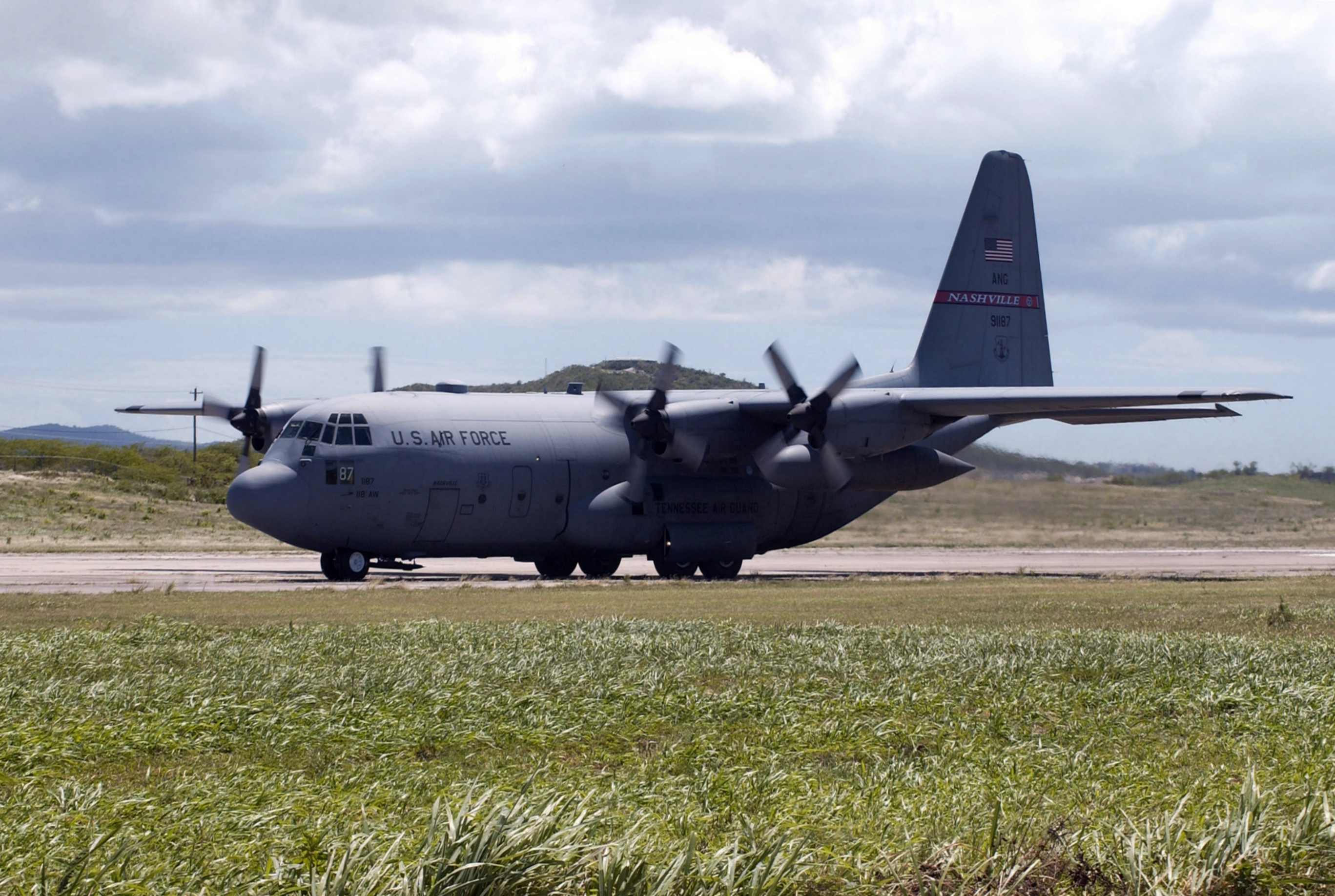
A 105th Airlift Squadron C-130H Hercules, Berry Field ANGB, Nashville, in 2002

1990 was the start of another conversion process. The 105th received a total of sixteen new C-130H2 Hercules aircraft from Lockheed at Marietta, Georgia. The Iraqi invasion of Kuwait in August 1990, placed the largest demand upon 105th personnel in almost 40 years. The Wing mobilized 462 personnel during 21 deployments for Operations Desert Shield/Desert Storm in southwest Asia and flew a record 7,500 flying hours.

On 1 January 1993, the 118th Tactical Airlift Wing became the 118th Airlift Wing as a result of the Wing implementing an internal reorganization to the new Air Force directed objective wing structure. With the objective wing structure, the 105th Airlift Squadron, was assigned to the new 118th Operations Group.

The 105th Airlift Squadron deployed three aircraft, six air crews and 65 maintenance and support personnel to Rhein-Main Air Base, Germany from 27 December 1993 to 7 May 1994 in support of Operation Provide Promise in Bosnia-Herzegovina. The 118 AW was deployed in support of this operation for seven of thirteen consecutive months. This commitment was in addition to six two-week CORONET OAK rotations to Panama and a normal schedule of local training, Guardlift and AMC week-long floater missions.

=== Lineage ===
- Organized as the 105th Aero Squadron (Service) on 27 August 1917

Demobilized on 8 May 1919

- Reconstituted and consolidated (1936) with 136th Squadron which, having been allotted to the Tennessee National Guard, was organized on 4 December 1921

Re-designated as: 136th Observation Squadron on 25 January 1923
Re-designated as: 105th Observation Squadron in 1923
Re-designated as: 105th Observation Squadron (Medium) on 13 January 1942
Re-designated as: 105th Observation Squadron on 4 July 1942
Inactivated on 18 October 1942

- Activated on 1 March 1943

Re-designated as: the 105th Reconnaissance Squadron (Bombardment) on 2 April 1943
Disbanded on: August 1943

- Reconstituted as: 105th Reconnaissance Squadron (Bombardment) on 1 June 1945 (Remained inactive)

Re-designated as: 105th Fighter Squadron and allotted to Tennessee ANG, on 24 May 1946
Re-designated as: 105th Fighter Squadron, 26 November 1946

- Extended federal recognition and activated on 3 February 1947

Re-designated as: 105th Tactical Reconnaissance Squadron, 1 February 1951
Federalized and placed on active duty, 2 March 1951
Re-designated as: 105th Fighter Squadron (Single Engine), 2 March 1951
Released from active duty and returned to Tennessee state control, 1 December 1952
Returned to 105th Tactical Reconnaissance Squadron designation, 1 December 1952
Re-designated as: 105th Air Transport Squadron , 1 July 1961
Re-designated as: 105th Military Airlift Squadron , 8 January 1966
Re-designated as: 105th Tactical Airlift Squadron , 1 March 1971
Re-designated as: 105th Airlift Squadron, 10 March 1992
Re-designated as: 105th Attack Squadron, 2015

=== Assignments ===
- Post Headquarters, Kelly Field, 27 August – 4 November 1917
- Aviation Concentration Center, 4–23 November 1917
- Air Service Supply Depot No. 1, AEF, 27 December 1917
- Air Service Production Center No. 2, AEF, 21 November 1918
- Air Service Spares Depot, AEF, c. January-c. March 1919
- Unknown, c. March-27 April 1919
- Post Headquarters, Michel Field, 27 April – 8 May 1919
- Tennessee National Guard, 4 December 1921

Originally intended as corps air service, served as divisional aviation, 30th Division

- Fourth Corps Area, 16 September 1940
- First Army, 3 October 1940
- I Army Corps, c. November 1940
- 65th Observation Group, 1 September 1941 – 18 October 1942
- 65th Observation (later Reconnaissance) Group, 1 March – 15 August 1943
- 54th Fighter Wing, 24 May 1946
- 118th Fighter Group, 3 February 1947
- 118th Composite Group, 1 September 1950
- 52d Fighter-Interceptor Wing, 2 March 1951
- 4709th Defense Wing, 1 February 1952
- 35th Air Division, 5 August 1952
- 118th Tactical Reconnaissance Group, 1 December 1952
- 118th Air Transport Group, 1 April 1961
- 118th Military Airlift Group, 8 January 1966
- 118th Tactical Airlift Group, 1 March 1971
- 118th Tactical Airlift Wing, 9 February 1975
- 118th Operations Group, 1 January 1993

=== Aircraft ===
- Included Curtiss JN-4, Consolidated TW-3, Consolidated PT-1, BT-1, 0-2, 0-11, and O-17 Courier during period 1921-1933
- Douglas O-38, C. 1932-1935
- Douglas O-25, C. 1935-1938
- Douglas O-38, C. 1938-1941
- North American O-47, C. 1939-1942
- O-52 Owl, 1941–1942
- Martin B-10, 1942
- Douglas O-46, 1942
- Included O-49 Vigilant and L-2 Grasshopper during period 1941-1942
- B-25 Mitchell, 1943
- P-47 Thunderbolt (1947–1954)
- F-51D Mustang (1953–1955)
- RF-84F Thunderflash (1956–1961)
- RF-80A Shooting Star (1954–1956)
- C-97G Stratofreighter (1961–1967)
- C-124C Globemaster II (1967–1971)
- C-130A Hercules (1971–1990)
- C-130H Hercules (1990–2012)
- MQ-9 Reaper (2015–Present)

=== Stations ===
- Kelly Field, Texas; 27 August 1917
- Aviation Concentration Center, Garden City, New York; 4–23 November 1917
- Winchester, England; 8–23 December 1917
- Clichy, Hauts-de-Seine, Paris; 27 December 1917, c. January – c. March 1919
- Romorantin Aerodrome, France; 21 November 1918
- Mitchel Field, New York; c. 27 April – 8 May 1919
- Blackwood Field, Old Hickory, Tennessee; 4 December 1921
- McConnell Field, Nashville, Tennessee; 1927, April 1931
- Memphis Municipal Airport, Memphis, Tennessee; November 1930
- Sky Harbor Airport, Murfreesboro, Tennessee; 1932
- Berry Field, Nashville, Tennessee; c. March 1937, 1947–present
- Lexington County Airport, South Carolina; 24 September 1940
- Langley Field, Virginia; 26 December 1941

Operated from Cherry Point Marine Corps Airfield, North Carolina; 28 April – 12 May 1942

- Georgetown Marine Corps Airfield (OLF), Georgetown, South Carolina; 24 May 1942
- Charleston AAF, South Carolina; 29 August 1942
- Birmingham Airport, Birmingham, Alabama; 18 October 1942
- Columbia AAB, South Carolina; 1 March 1943
- Florence AAF, South Carolina; 12 April – 15 August 1943.

Operated from McGhee Tyson Air Force Base, Tennessee; 1 July – 1 December 1952 (Federalized Service)

== See also ==
- List of American Aero Squadrons
- List of United States Army National Guard Observation Squadrons
