= 461st Flight Test Squadron =

US Air Force squadron, part of Air Force Materiel Command

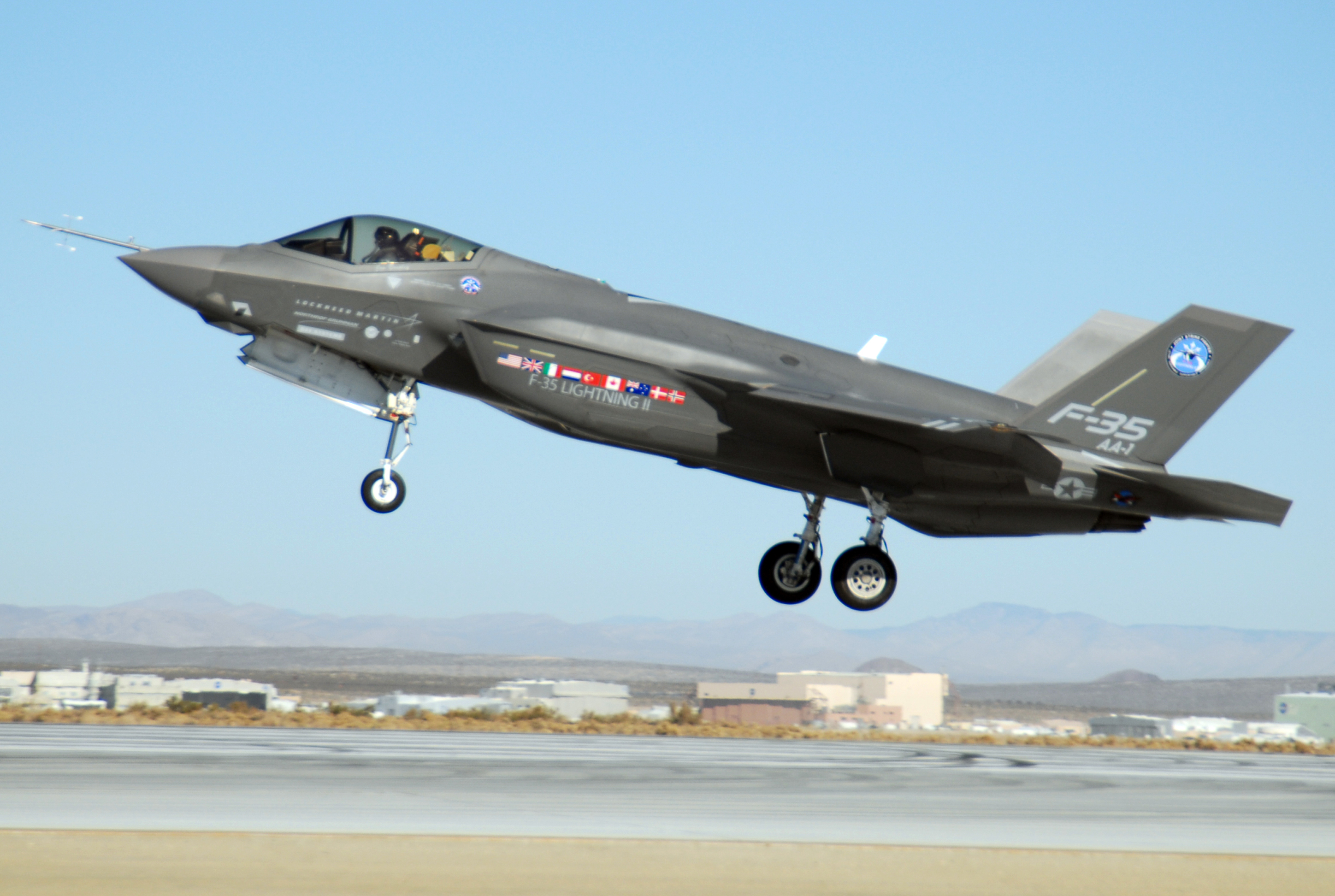
- An F-35 Lightning II, marked AA-1, lands at Edwards Air Force Base
- Active: 12 December 1942 – Present
- Country: United States
- Branch: United States Air Force
- Type: Squadron
- Role: Flight Testing
- Part of: Air Force Materiel Command
- Garrison/HQ: Edwards Air Force Base, California
- Mottos: Caveant Caelum Nostrum Latin Beware, Our Sky
- Engagements: Operation Market Garden
- Decorations: Distinguished Unit Citation; Air Force Outstanding Unit Award

Insignia
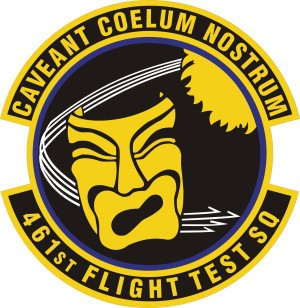
- 461st Flight Test Squadron emblem (approved 27 August 1957)

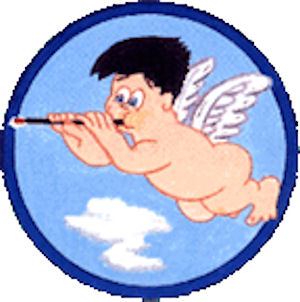
- unofficial 361st Fighter Squadron emblem prior to 1945
- World War II Squadron Fuselage Code: QI
- 412th Wing Tail Code: ED

Aircraft flown
- Fighter: F-35 Lightning II

The 461st Flight Test Squadron is a United States Air Force squadron, assigned to the 412th Operations Group of Air Force Materiel Command, and is stationed at Edwards Air Force Base, California. The Squadron performs flight testing on the Lockheed Martin F-35 Lightning II.

The squadron's origins can be traced to the 361st Fighter Squadron, which flew combat in the European Theater of Operations, where it won a Distinguished Unit Citation before inactivating in 1945.

In 1985, the 361st Squadron was consolidated with the 461st Tactical Fighter Training Squadron. The 461st had been activated in 1956 as the 461st Fighter-Day Squadron and served as a fighter unit in Europe until 1959. It served as a training unit in Arizona starting in 1977. The consolidated unit was inactivated in 1994, but was activated again in its current role in 2006.

== Overview ==
The 461st Squadron tests aircraft systems at Edwards Air Force Base.

== History ==
=== World War II ===
The squadron was organized and trained in the Northeast United States by First Air Force. During training it was a part of the northeast air defense, linking it to the New York and Boston Fighter Wings.

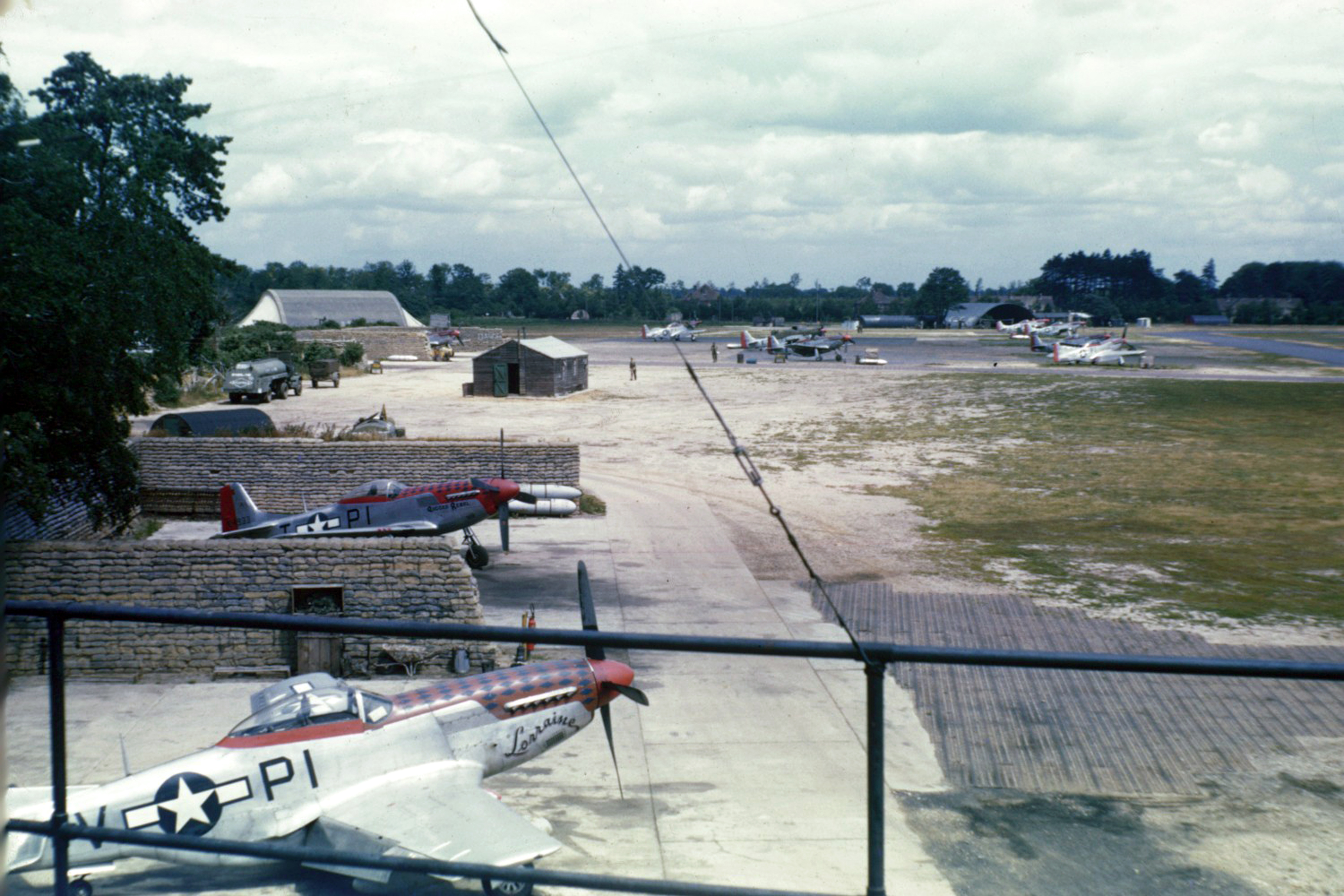
North American P-51s of the 361st Fighter Squadron in protective revetments at RAF Martlesham Heath, England, 1944.

The 461st Squadron was deployed to England aboard the RMS Queen Elizabeth and served in combat as a part of the VIII Fighter Command from October 1943 to May 1945. The 461st ran operations in preparation for the invasion of the European continent; they supported the landings in Normandy and the Allied drive across France and Germany. The squadron flew Republic P-47 Thunderbolts until they were replaced by North American P-51 Mustangs in November 1944. Aircraft of the 461st were identified by a magenta/blue diamond pattern around their cowling, carrying fuselage code QI.

From October 1943 until January 1944 the squadron operated as escort for Boeing B-17 Flying Fortress and Consolidated B-24 Liberator bombers that attacked industrial areas, missile sites, airfields, and communications.

Fighters from the 461st engaged primarily in bombing and strafing missions after 3 January 1944. Its targets included U-boat installations, barges, shipyards, aerodromes, hangars, marshaling yards, locomotives, trucks, oil facilities, flak towers, and radar stations. The 461st bombed and strafed the Arnhem, Netherlands area on 17, 18, and 23 September 1944 in order to neutralize enemy gun emplacements that were providing support to Allied ground forces during Operation Market-Garden. In early 1945, the squadron's Mustangs clashed with German Messerschmitt Me 262 jet aircraft. The squadron flew its last combat mission, escorting B-17's dropping propaganda leaflets, on 7 May 1945.

The squadron remained in the United Kingdom during the balance of 1945, most personnel were demobilized and returned to the United States, with aircraft being sent to storage facilities in the UK. The squadron was inactivated at Camp Myles Standish, Massachusetts on 10 November 1945.

=== Fighter operations in Europe ===
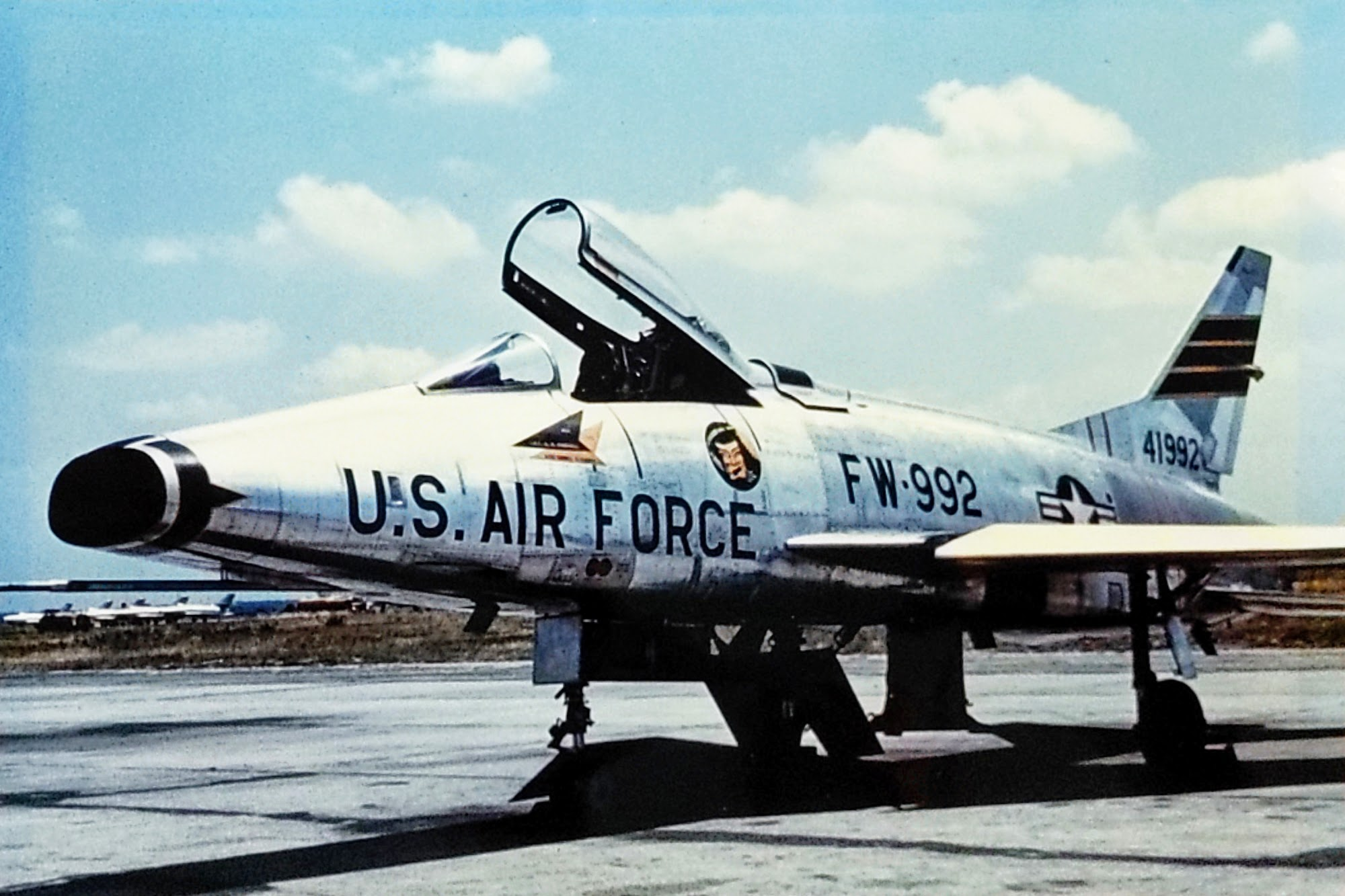
461st FDS F-100C at Hahn AFB

The 461st Fighter-Day Squadron was reactivated at Hahn Air Base, West Germany during February 1956, equipped with North American F-100 Super Sabres, being one of the first United States Air Forces Europe squadrons equipped with supersonic jet aircraft. The aircraft carried three black diagonal stripes on the tail. Between 1956 and 1959, it conducted air superiority and general support missions as directed by Twelfth Air Force and, later by United States Air Forces in Europe. It also maintained and trained forces for a limited fighter-bomber capability with basic air-to-air weapons. The squadron was inactivated in August 1959.

=== Fighter training ===
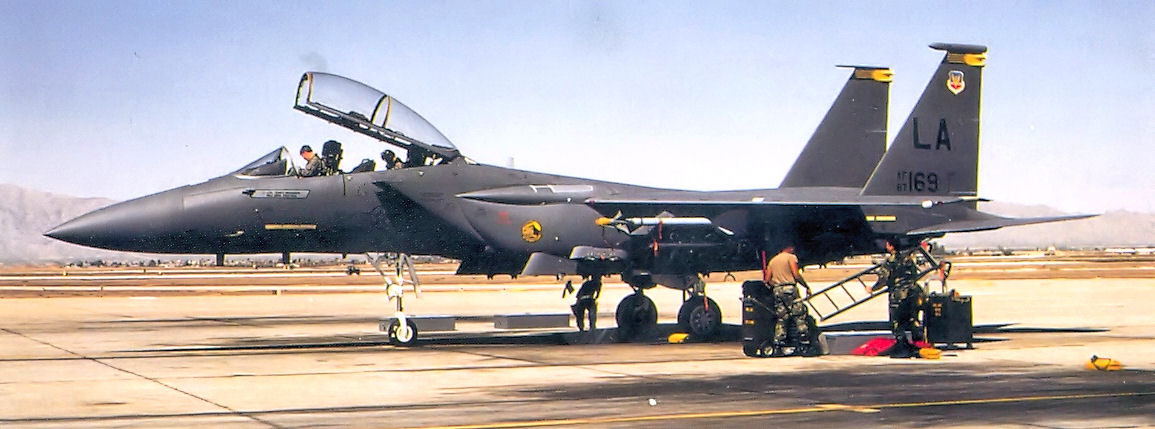
461st Squadron F-15E Strike Eagle (Note: Aircraft is McDonnell Douglas F-15E-43-MC Strike Eagle serialk 87-169.)

The 461st was reactivated on 1 July 1977 at Luke Air Force Base, Arizona as a Replacement Training Unit (RTU) for the McDonnell Douglas F-15A Eagle, conducting fighter aircraft aircrew training for pilots. The improved F-15C/D model arrived in 1982 for pilot training. In 1985 the Air Force consolidated the 461st Tactical Fighter Training Squadron with the World War II 361st Fighter Squadron, giving the squadron a combat heritage and lineage.

In the late 1980s, the F-15E Strike Eagle dual-role version of the F-15C arrived at Luke. The 461st received the first new F‑15E on 12 April 1988. The squadron continued to gain aircraft and the first F‑15E transition class graduated on 24 February 1989. Once qualified, the crews were reassigned to an operational squadron at the 4th Tactical Fighter Wing at Seymour Johnson Air Force Base, North Carolina. It was inactivated on 5 August 1994 as part of the phase-down of F-15 training at Luke.

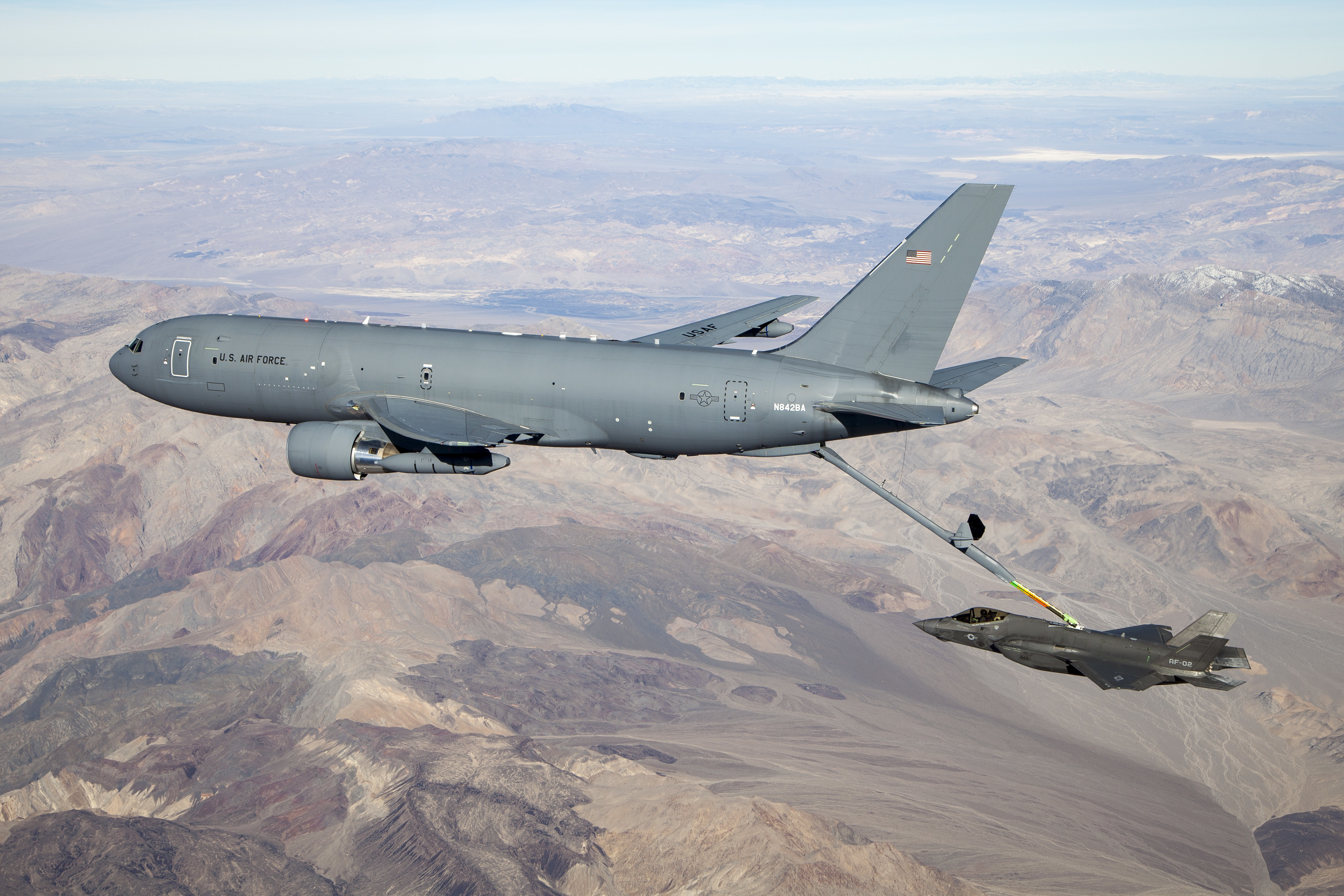
A KC-46A Pegasus connects with a 461st Squadron F-35 Lightning II in the skies over California 22 January 2019

=== Flight test ===
The squadron was reactivated at Edwards Air Force Base, California, in 2006. Its mission is flight testing aircraft, primarily the F-35 Lightning II.

On 22 January 2019, a Boeing KC-46 Pegasus from the 418th Flight Test Squadron made connection with an F-35A from the 461st Flight Test Squadron. It is the first time the KC-46 connected with a fifth-generation jet fighter.

== Lineage ==
361st Fighter Squadron

- Constituted as the 361st Fighter Squadron on 8 December 1942

Activated on 12 December 1942
Redesignated 361st Fighter Squadron, Single Engine on 20 September 1944
Inactivated on 11 November 1945

- Consolidated with the 461st Tactical Fighter Training Squadron as the 461st Tactical Fighter Training Squadron on 19 September 1985

461st Flight Test Squadron

- Constituted as the 461st Fighter-Day Squadron on 30 December 1955

Activated on 8 February 1956
Redesignated 461st Tactical Fighter Squadron on 8 July 1958
Inactivated on 1 August 1959

- Redesignated 461st Tactical Fighter Training Squadron on 15 July 1976

Activated on 1 July 1977

- Consolidated with the 361st Fighter Squadron on 19 September 1985

Redesignated 461st Fighter Squadron on 1 November 1991
Inactivated on 5 August 1994

- Redesignated 461st Flight Test Squadron on 23 October 2006

Activated on 27 October 2006

=== Assignments ===
- 356th Fighter Group, 12 December 1942 – 10 November 1945
- Army Service Forces, Port of Embarkation, 10–11 November 1945
- 36th Fighter-Day Group, 8 February 1956 (attached to 86th Fighter-Interceptor Group until 2 May 1956, 36th Fighter-Day Wing after 1 October 1956)
- 36th Fighter-Day Wing (later 36th Tactical Fighter Wing), 8 December 1957 – 1 August 1959
- 58th Tactical Training Wing, 1 July 1977
- 405th Tactical Training Wing, 29 August 1979
- 58th Operations Group, 1 October 1991
- 56th Operations Group, 1 April – 5 August 1994
- 412th Operations Group, 27 October 2006 – present

=== Stations ===
- Westover Field, Massachusetts, 12 December 1942
- New Haven Army Air Field, Connecticut, 2 March 1943
- Bradley Field, Connecticut, 19 April 1943
- Suffolk County Army Air Field, New York, 8 June 1943
- Grenier Field, New Hampshire, 4 July 1943
- Camp Myles Standish, Massachusetts, 15–20 August 1943
- RAF Goxhill (AAF-345), England, 27 August 1943
- RAF Martlesham Heath (AAF-369), England, 9 October 1943 – 28 October 1945
- Camp Myles Standish, Massachusetts, 10–11 November 1945
- Landstuhl Air Base, West Germany, 8 February 1956
- Hahn Air Base, West Germany, 2 May 1956 – 1 August 1959
- Luke Air Force Base, Arizona, 1 July 1977 – 5 August 1994
- Edwards Air Force Base, California, 27 October 2006 – present

=== Aircraft ===
- Republic P-47 Thunderbolt (1943–1944)
- North American P-51 Mustang (1944–1945)
- North American F-86 Sabre (1956)
- North American F-100 Super Sabre (1956–1959)
- Lockheed T-33 Shooting Star (1956)
- McDonnell Douglas F-15A Eagle (1977–1988)
- McDonnell Douglas F-15E Strike Eagle (1988–1994)
- Lockheed Martin F-35 Lightning II (2006–present)

== See also ==
- List of United States Air Force test squadrons
