= Amalgam Virgo =

Counter-terrorist and field training exercise held in Florida, US

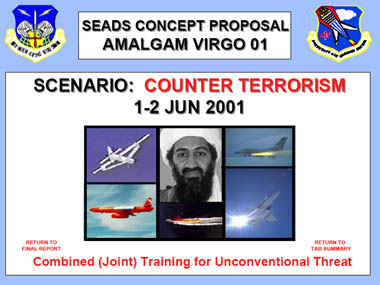
Amalgam Virgo 01 (1–2 June / 2001) Click PDF

Operation Amalgam Virgo was a United States military and counterterrorist exercise conducted in early June 2001 in the state of Florida.

The Amalgam Virgo exercise involved the hypothetical scenario of a cruise missile or unmanned aerial vehicle (drone) attack launched against the U.S. by a terrorist group. The North American Aerospace Defense Command (NORAD) sponsored the multi-service and multi-agency counterterrorism and field training exercise. The exercise was carried out at Tyndall Air Force Base, Florida, from June 1-2, 2001.

Key military players in the exercise included personnel from the 1st U.S. Air Force battalion, the U.S. National Guard, the U.S. Reserve forces, and the U.S. Navy.

Navy ships including the USS Yorktown (CG-48), an Aegis-equipped cruiser, were dispatched to the Gulf of Mexico as part of the exercise. Personnel from the 1st Air Force also gathered radar information on low-level targets by using the Joint-Based Expeditionary Connectivity Center (JBECC), a deployable mobile shelter, while providing early warning signals of cruise missile attacks.
