= 118th Operations Group =

118th Operations Group

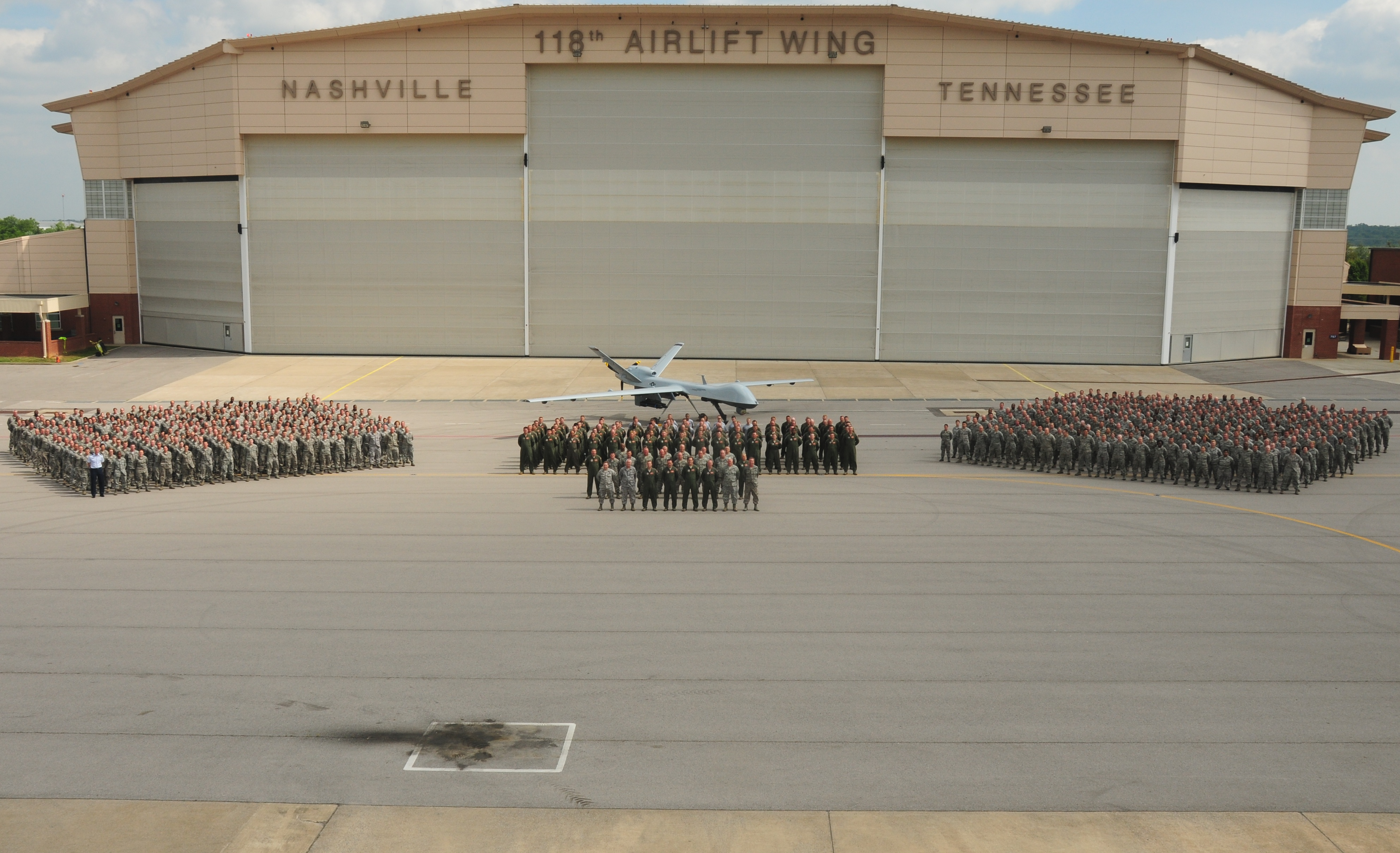
- Group members and MQ-9 Reaper on the ramp
- Active: 1942–1945, 1947–1953, 1953–1961; 1961–1975, 1993–present
- Country: United States
- Allegiance: Tennessee
- Branch: Air National Guard
- Role: Aerial reconnaissance
- Part of: Tennessee Air National Guard
- Garrison/HQ: Joint Base Berry Field
- Nicknames: The Blue Diamonds, The Martlesam Playboys (World War II)
- Engagements: European Theater of Operations
- Decorations: Distinguished Unit Citation

Commanders
- Notable commanders: Colonel Einar Axel Malmstrom

Insignia
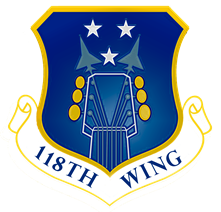
- 118th Operations Group emblem (Note: While assigned to the 118th Wing, the group uses the wing emblem with the group designation on the scroll. AF Instruction 84-105, Organizational Lineage, Honors and History, 27 April 2017, paragraph 3.3.3.)

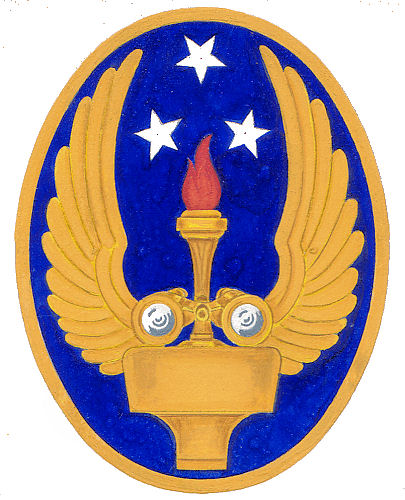
- 118th Tactical Reconnaissance Group emblem (Note: Approved 5 January 1954. Description: On a blue oval with a yellow border an aerial camera supporting binoculars and a torch, the whole group winged, all yellow with flame proper and lenses blue and white, above the torch and between the tips of the wings three white stars.)

The 118th Operations Group is an active unit of the Tennessee Air National Guard, stationed at Joint Base Berry Field, where it operates General Atomics MQ-9 Reaper unmanned aerial vehicles.

The group was first activated during World War II as the 356th Fighter Group. After training in the United States, it deployed to England in the summer of 1943 as an element of VIII Fighter Command. It engaged in combat operations until the spring of 1945, earning a Distinguished Unit Citation for its actions during Operation Market Garden. After V-E Day, it returned to the United States for inactivation.

In May 1946, the group was allotted to the National Guard as the 118th Fighter Group, organizing at Berry Field the following year. In 1951, it converted to an aerial reconnaissance unit as the 118th Tactical Reconnaissance Group and was called to active duty for the Korean War. It trained reconnaissance units until returning to the Air National Guard (ANG) in 1953. The group continued with the reconnaissance mission until 1961, when it became the 118th Air Transport Group, an airlift unit. In 1975, it was inactivated when the ANG discontinued its operational groups located on the same bases as their parent wings. When the Air Force reorganized under the Objective Wing Model, the group was again activated as the 118th Operations Group in 1993.

== History ==
=== World War II ===
==== Organization and training in the United States ====
The group was first activated at Westover Field, Massachusetts in December 1942 and assigned the 359th, 360th, and 361st Fighter Squadrons. The group soon equipped with Republic P-47 Thunderbolts and trained with them, while also performing service in the air defense of the northeastern United States. The group's ground echelon deployed to England from Camp Myles Standish, Massachusetts on 15 August aboard the RMS Queen Elizabeth. (Note: The group's pilots sailed separately,and a few of the group's Thunderbolts were ferried to England via the North Atlantic ferry route. Freeman, p. 251.)

==== Combat in Europe ====
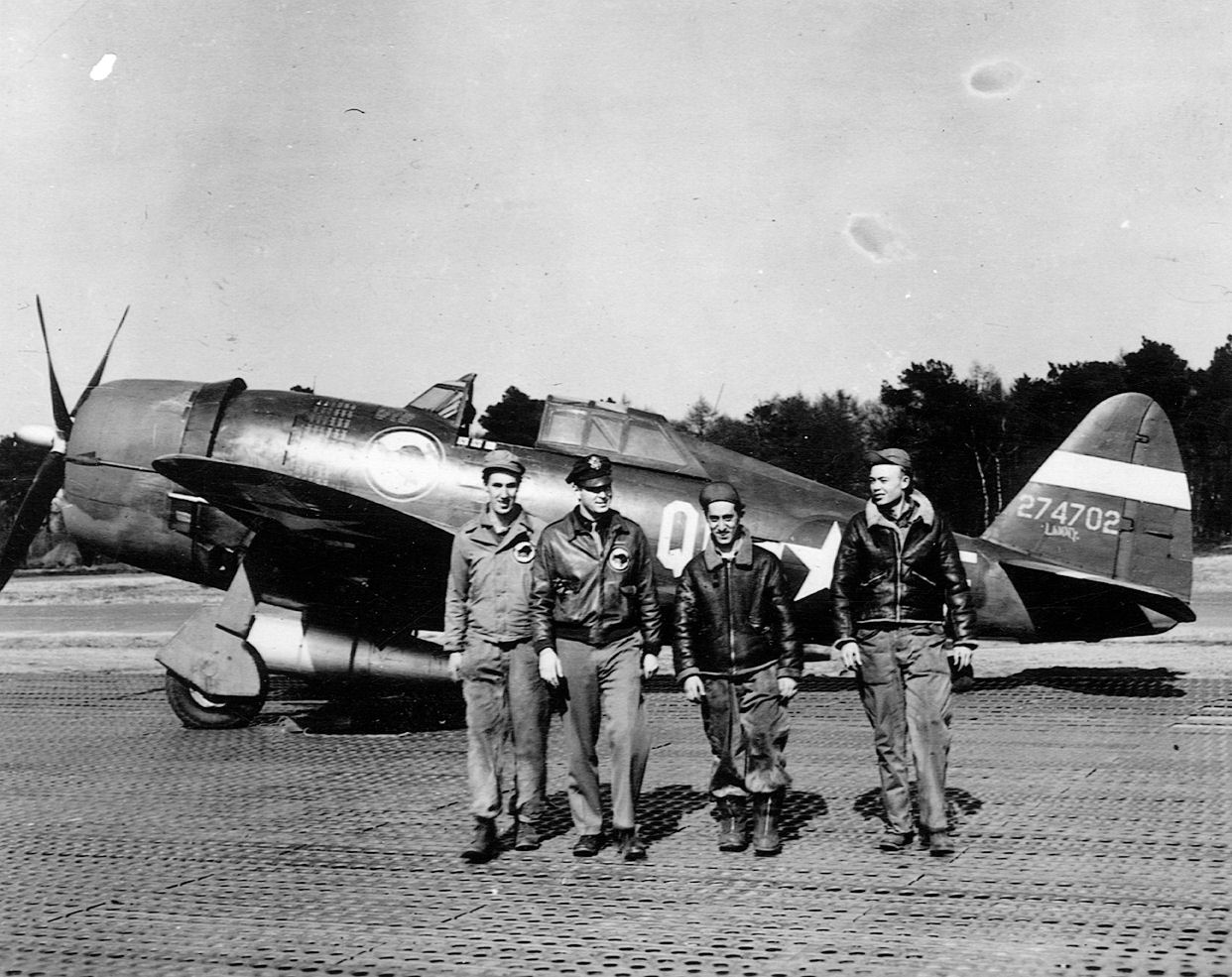
Group P-47 at RAF Goxhill (Note: Aircraft is Republic P-47D-6-RE Thunderbolt, QI-F, serial 42-74702, Clarkie of the 361st Fighter Squadron. Dirkx, Marco (13 May 2024). "1942 USAF Serial Numbers". Joe Baugher’s Serial Number List.)

The group arrived at RAF Goxhill in late August 1943. After preparing for combat, it moved to RAF Martlesham Heath in October and entered combat on 15 October. Through January 1944, it engaged primarily in missions escorting heavy bombers attacking industrial areas, missile sites, airfields and lines of communications. The 356th engaged primarily in bombing and strafing missions after late January 1944, with targets including submarine pens, barges, shipyards, airfields, marshalling yards, locomotives, trucks, vehicles, oil facilities, flak towers, and radar stations.

During Operation Market Garden, the group bombed and strafed in the Arnhem area on 17, 18, and 23 September 1944 to neutralize enemy flak emplacements, reducing the danger for troop carriers resupplying the paratroopers. Lead elements acted as "flak bait" and once German defenses opened up would peel away so following elements could attack with guns and bombs. On the first day, this tactic successfully silenced nearly all the defenses. The group received a Distinguished Unit Citation for this contribution to the airborne attack on the Netherlands.

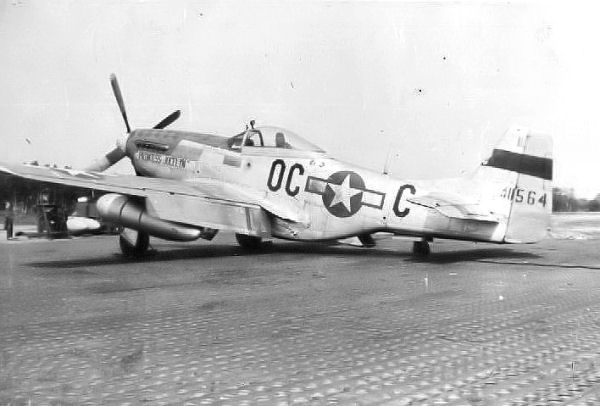
359th Fighter Squadron P-51 (Note: Aircraft is North American P-51K-5-NT Mustang, serial 44-11564 Princess Jocelyn of the 359th Fighter Squadron. Dirkx, Marco (18 August 2025). "1944 USAF Serial Numbers". Joe Baugher’s Serial Number List.)

In November 1944, the group transitioned into North American P-51 Mustangs. In one of its first engagements using the Mustang, on 26 November, the group claimed 23 enemy aircraft destroyed for no losses. In early 1945, group Mustangs clashed with German Arado 234 jet aircraft. The group flew its last combat mission on 7 May 1945, escorting Boeing B-17 Flying Fortresses dropping propaganda leaflets. The group claimed 201 enemy aircraft destroyed in the air and an additional 75 1/2 on the ground for the loss of 122 fighters. The highest scoring ace of the group was D.J. Strait of the 361st Squadron with 13 1/2 victories. During its period in combat, the group suffered the highest rate of loss compared to its claims of enemy aircraft destroyed of any fighter group in Eighth Air Force.

The 356th remained in England after V-E Day until November. In August and September, it transferred its planes to depots and most of its personnel were assigned to other units. The remainder of the group sailed aboard the RMS Queen Mary on 4 November 1945 for Camp Kilmer, New Jersey, where it was inactivated on 10 November 1945.

=== Air National Guard ===
==== Initial organization and mobilization for the Korean War ====
The group was allotted to the National Guard as the 118th Fighter Group on 24 May 1946. It was organized on 1 September 1947 at Berry Field, Tennessee and federally recognized a month later. It was assigned the 105th Fighter Squadron, which had been part of the Tennessee National Guard in the inter-war years, along with two of its World War II squadrons, now numbered the 155th and 156th Fighter Squadrons. The 105th was stationed with group headquarters, while the 155th was located at Memphis Municipal Airport, Tennessee, and the 156th at Morris Field, North Carolina.

In the fall of 1950, the Air National Guard reorganized to the Wing Base Organization system, which placed operational and support organizations under a single wing. On 1 November, the group was redesignated the 118th Composite Group and assigned to the newly-activated 118th Composite Wing. Three months later, however both the wing and the group became reconnaissance units, with the group redesignating as the 118th Tactical Reconnaissance Group.

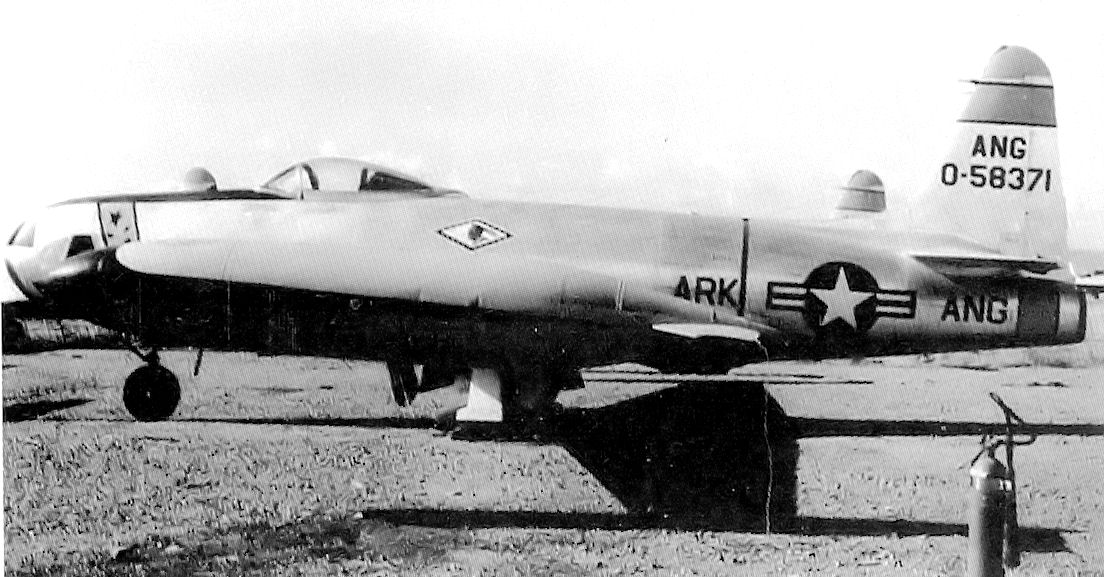
Group RF-80 Shooting Star (Note: Aircraft is Lockheed RF-80A-5-LO Shooting Star, serial 45-8371 of the 106th Tactical Reconnaissance Squadron. Sent to the Military Aircraft Storage and Disposition Center (MASDC) on 23 April 1958. Dirkx, Marco (9 June 2025). "1945 USAF Serial Numbers". Joe Baugher’s Serial Number List.)

On 1 April 1951, the 118th Wing, including the group, was called to active duty for the Korean War. The group moved to Memphis Municipal Airport, where its squadrons were equipped with a mix of North American RF-51 Mustangs, Lockheed RF-80 Shooting Stars, and Douglas RB-26 Invaders. In January 1952, the group moved to Shaw Air Force Base, South Carolina. On 1 January 1953, the group was released from active duty and returned to the Tennessee Air National Guard. Its personnel and equipment remained at Shaw, transferring to the 66th Tactical Reconnaissance Group, which was activated the same day.

==== Reconnaissance operations ====
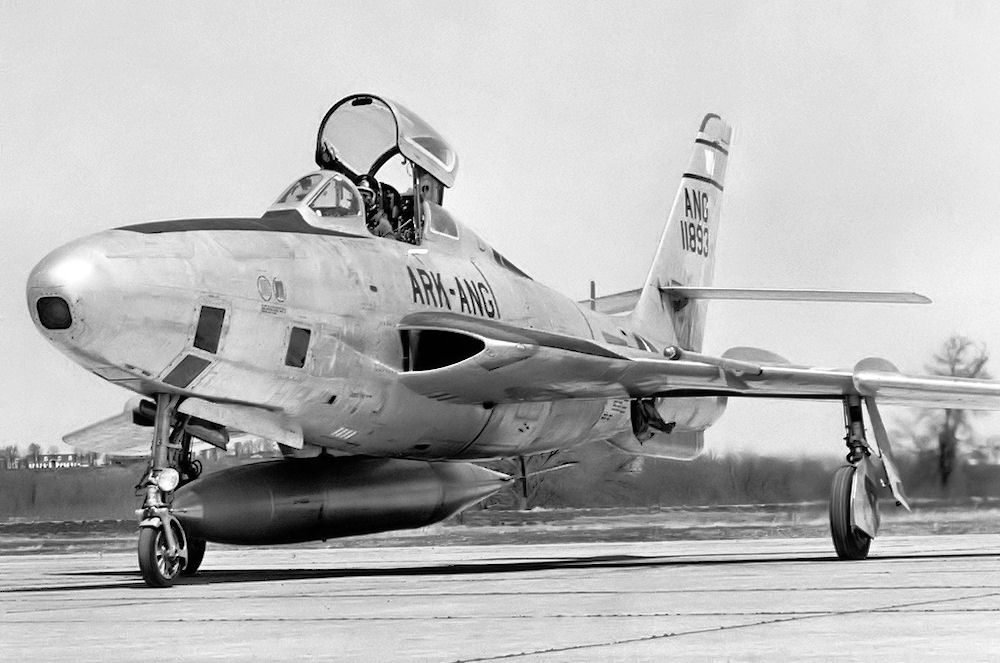
Group RF-84F Thundeflash (Note: Aircraft is Republic RF-84F-10-RE Thunderflash, serial 51-1893 of the 184th Tactical Reconnaissance Squadron. Sent to MASDC on 1 October 1970, sold for scrap on 26 January 1977. Dirkx, Marco (28 July 2025). "1951 USAF Serial Numbers". Joe Baugher’s Serial Number List.)

After returning to the Guard, the group's squadrons included the 105th and 155th Squadrons assigned to it prior to its period on active duty, but also the 154th Tactical Reconnaissance Squadron at Little Rock Air Force Base, Arkansas and the 184th Tactical Reconnaissance Squadron at Fort Smith Regional Airport, Arkansas. In 1955, the group became an all-jet unit when it equipped with Lockheed RF-80 Shooting Stars, and by 1957, its squadrons were flying Republic RF-84F Thunderflashs. In September 1957, in response to the Little Rock School Crisis of 1957, President Eisenhower federalized the Arkansas National Guard, including the 154th and 184th Squadrons. The squadrons were returned to state control the following month..

==== Airlift operations ====
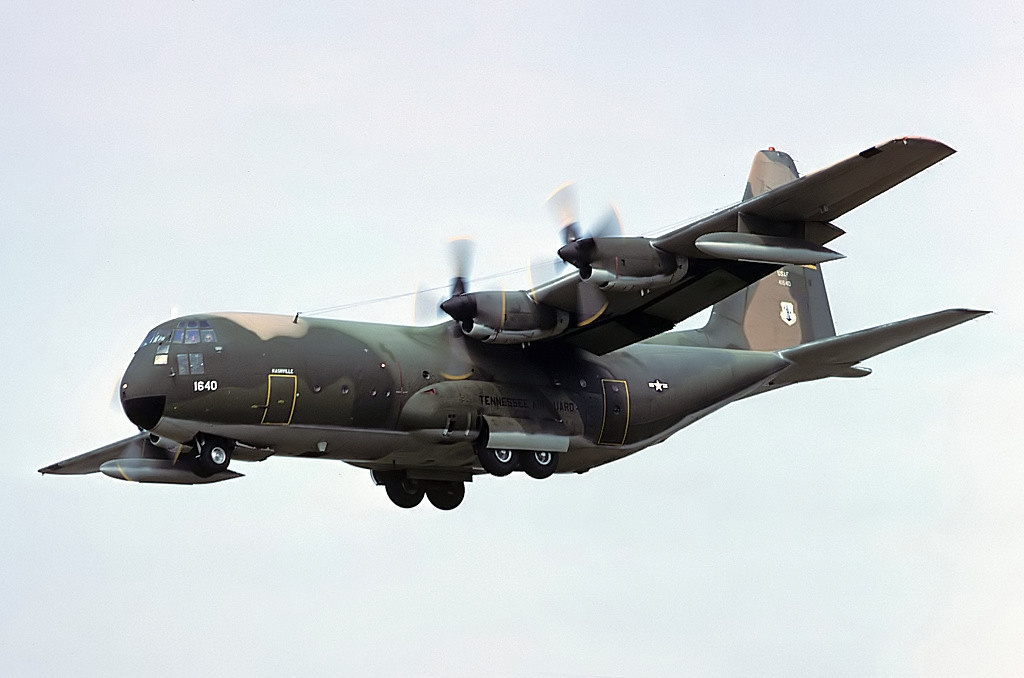
Group Lockheed C-130A Hercules (Note: Aircraft is Lockheed C-130A-LM, serial 54-1640 of the 105th Tactical Airlift Squadron. Sent to Fort Bragg as a ground trainer, then to MASDC on 23 April 1990. Dirkx, Marco (30 July 2025). "1954 USAF Serial Numbers". Joe Baugher’s Serial Number List.)

In April 1961, the group's mission changed as it equipped with Boeing C-97 Stratofreighters, becoming the 118th Air Transport Group. Along with the change in mission came a change in organization. The 118th Group's operational squadrons were located on bases as “augmented squadrons” containing support elements needed to sustain operations. By the law at the time Guardsmen could only be activated as members of a mobilized unit. This meant that, even if only operational and maintenance elements were needed for mobilization, the entire “augmented squadron” had to be called to active duty, including unneeded administrative personnel. The response was to replace the “augmented squadron” with a group including functional squadrons that could be mobilized as a group, or individually. This meant that while the group retained only its 105th Squadron as a flying element, it added an air base squadron, an aeromedical evacuation squadron and a dispensary.

In January 1966, the squadron was redesignated 118th Military Airlift Group with no change in mission or aircraft. The following year, it replaced its Stratofreighters with Douglas C-124 Globemaster IIs. In 1971, its mission changed from strategic to tactical airlift as it became the 118th Tactical Airlft Group and equipped with the Lockheed C-130 Hercules. In the 1970s, the Air National Guard decided that flying groups located on the same bases as their parent wings constituted an additional layer of management. In this elimination of operational groups, the 118th was inactivated on 26 February 1975 and its elements reassigned directly to the 118th Wing.

==== Reactivation ====
Nearly eighteen years later, on 1 January 1993, the group was again activated as the 118th Operations Group, as the ANG implemented the Air Force's Objective Wing reorganization. Once again, the group's 105th Airlift Squadron was flying the C-130 Hercules, although the newer C-130H, rather than the C-130A it flew in 1975. In 2003, the group deployed most of its aircraft to Southwest Asia to support Operation Iraqi Freedom. In 2007, it exchanged its C-130Hs for Lockheed WC-130s as its mission changed from airlift to international training.

Following an announcement in 2012 that the group would lose its piloted aircraft mission, it converted to operating the General Atomics MQ-9 Reaper.

== Lineage ==
- Constituted as the 356th Fighter Group on 8 December 1942

Activated on 12 December 1942
Inactivated on 10 November 1945
Redesignated 118th Fighter Group, Single Engine and allotted to the National Guard on 24 May 1946
Activated on 1 September 1947
Federally recognized on 2 October 1947
Redesignated 118th Composite Group on 1 November 1950
Redesignated 118th Tactical Reconnaissance Group on 1 February 1951
Ordered to active duty on 1 April 1951
Inactivated on 1 January 1953
Activated in the Tennessee Air National Guard on 1 January 1953
Inactivated on 1 April 1961
118th Air Transport Group, Heavy, constituted on 13 March 1961, activated on 1 April 1961
Redesignated 118th Military Airlift Group on 1 January 1966
Redesignated 118th Tactical Airlift Group on 26 March 1971
Inactivated on 26 February 1975
Redesignated 118th Operations Group
Activated on 1 January 1993

=== Components ===
Operational squadrons

- 105th Fighter Squadron (later 105th Tactical Reconnaissance Squadron, 105th Air Transport Squadron, 105th Military Airlift Squadron, 105th Tactical Airlift Squadron, 105th Airlift Squadron, 105th Attack Squadron), 1 September 1947 – 1 March 1951, 1 January 1953 – 1 April 1961, 1 April 1961 – 26 February 1975, 1 January 1992 – present
- 106th Tactical Reconnaissance Squadron, 1 February 1951 – 1 August 1951, 1 January 1952 – 1 January 1953
- 153d Fighter Squadron, 1 October 1950 – 1 February 1951
- 154th Tactical Reconnaissance Squadron, 1 January 1953 – September 1957, October 1957 – c. June 1958
- 155th Fighter Squadron, Tactical Reconnaissance Squadron (see 359th Fighter Squadron)
- 156th Fighter Squadron (see 360th Fighter Squadron)
- 174th Tactical Reconnaissance Squadron, c. 10 April 1958 – c. 29 April 1961
- 180th Tactical Reconnaissance Squadron, 10 April 1958 – c. 14 April 1961
- 184th Tactical Reconnaissance Squadron, c. 15 October 1953 – September 1957, October 1957 – c. April 1961
- 185th Tactical Reconnaissance Squadron, 1 April 1951 – 1 January 1953
- 359th Fighter Squadron (later 155th Fighter Squadron, 155th Tactical Reconnaissance Squadron), 12 December 1942 – 10 November 1945, 1 September 1947 – 1 January 1953, 1 January 1953 – 1 April 1961
- 360th Fighter Squadron (later 156th Fighter Squadron), 12 December 1942 – 10 November 1945, 1 September 1947 – 1948
- 361st Fighter Squadron, 12 December 1942 – 10 November 1945

Support elements

- 118th USAF Dispensary, 29 April 1961 – 25 March 1971
- 118th Aeromedical Evacuation Squadron, 29 April 1961 – 26 February 1975
- 118th Air Base Squadron, 29 April 1961 – 1 October 1963
- 118th Consolidated Aircraft Maintenance Squadron, 1 January 1966 – 26 February 1975
- 118th Materiel Squadron, 1 October 1963 – 1 January 1966
- 118th Operations Support Squadron, 1 January 1993 – present
- 118th Supply Squadron, 1 January 1966 – 26 February 1975
- 118th Support Squadron (later 118th Combat Support Squadron), 1 October 1963 – 26 February 1975
- 118th Aerial Port Flight (later 118th Mobile Aerial Port Flight), 13 June 1966 – 26 February 1975
- 118th Civil Engineering Flight, 1 November 1969 – 26 February 1975
- 118th Communications Flight, 13 June 1966 – 26 February 1975
- 118th Mobility Support Flight, 25 March 1971 – 26 February 1975
- 118th Weapons System Support Flight, 25 March 1971 – 26 February 1975

=== Assignments ===
- Boston Air Defense Wing, 12 December 1942
- I Fighter Command, 28 January 1943
- New York Air Defense Wing 30 May 1943
- Boston Fighter Wing, 4 July 1943
- 65th Fighter Wing, by October 1943 (Note: Freeman dates this assignment from 26 August 1943.)
- 67th Fighter Wing, 8 August 1944
- Army Service Forces, New York Port of Embarkation (for inactivation), 4–10 November 1945
- 54th Fighter Wing, 1 September 1947
- 118th Composite Wing (later 118th Tactical Reconnaissance Wing), 1 November 1950 – 1 January 1953
- 118th Tactical Reconnaissance Wing, 1 January 1953 – 1 April 1961
- 118th Air Transport Wing (later 118th Military Airlift Wing, 118th Tactical Airlift Wing), 1 April 1961 – 26 February 1975
- 118th Airlift Wing (later 118th Wing), 1 January 1993 – present

=== Stations ===
- Westover Field, Massachusetts, 12 December 1942
- Groton Army Air Field, Connecticut, 12 March 1943
- Mitchel Field, New York, 30 May 1943
- Grenier Field, New Hampshire, 4 July – 15 August 1943
- RAF Goxhill (Station 345), England, 27 August 1943
- RAF Martlesham Heath (Station 369), England, 5 October 1943 – 4 November 1945
- Camp Kilmer, New Jersey, 9–10 November 1945
- Berry Field, Tennessee, 1 September 1947
- Memphis Municipal Airport, Tennessee, 12 April 1951
- Shaw Air Force Base, South Carolina, 15 January 1952 – 1 January 1953
- Berry Field, Tennessee, 1 January 1953 – 1 April 1961
- Berry Field Air National Guard Base, Tennessee, 1 April 1961 – 26 February 1975
- Joint Base Berry Field, Tennessee, 1 January 1993 – present

=== Aircraft ===
- Republic P-47 Thunderbolt, 1943-1944, 1947-1951
- Republic RF-47 Thunderbolt, 1951-1953
- North American P-51 Mustang,1944-1945
- North American RF-51 Mustang, 1951-1953, 1953-1955
- Lockheed RF-80 Shooting Star, 1951-1953, 1955-1956
- Douglas RB-26 Invader, 1951-1953
- Republic RF-84F Thunderflash, 1957-1961
- Boeing C-97 Stratofreighter, 1961-1967
- Douglas C-124 Globemaster II, 1967-1971
- Lockheed C-130A Hercules, 1971-1975
- Lockheed C-130H Hercules, 1993-2007
- Lockheed WC-130 Hercules, 2007-2015
- General Atomics MQ-9 Reaper, 2015-present

=== Awards and campaigns ===
Award streamer	Award	Dates	Notes
	Distinguished Unit Citation	17, 18, 23 September 1944	356th Fighter Group, Holland

Campaign Streamer	Campaign	Dates	Notes
	Air Offensive, Europe	27 August 1943–5 June 1944	356th Fighter Group
	Normandy	6 June 1944–24 July 1944	356th Fighter Group
	Northern France	25 July 1944–14 September 1944	356th Fighter Group
	Rhineland	15 September 1944–21 March 1945	356th Fighter Group
	Ardennes-Alsace	16 December 1944–25 January 1945	356th Fighter Group
	Central Europe	22 March 1944–21 May 1945	356th Fighter Group

== See also ==
- Cresswell Perrin Memorial
- List of C-130 Hercules operators
- List of A-26 Invader operators
