= RAF Martlesham Heath =

Former RAF station 1917–1963

RAF Martlesham Heath USAAF Station 369
- Woodbridge, Suffolk in England
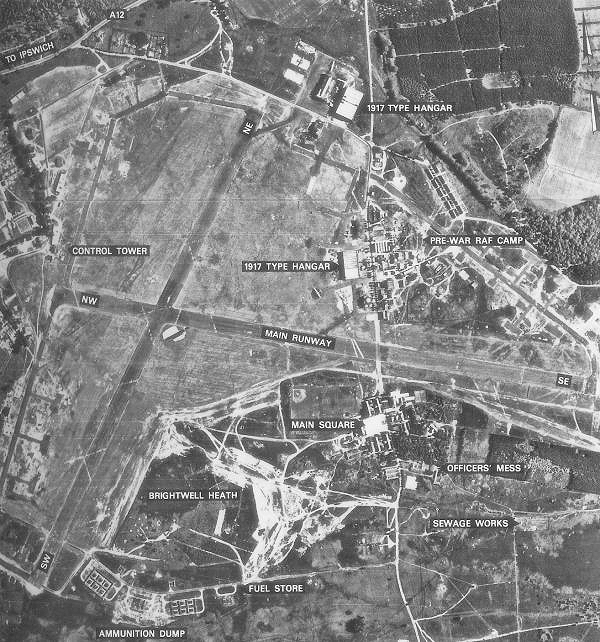
- Martlesham Heath Airfield - 9 July 1946

Site information
- Type: Royal Air Force station
- Code: MH
- Owner: Air Ministry
- Operator: Royal Flying Corps; Royal Air Force; United States Army Air Forces
- Controlled by: RAF Fighter Command * No. 11 Group RAF; 1939-43; Eighth Air Force

Location
- Shown within Suffolk RAF Martlesham Heath (the United Kingdom)
- Coordinates: 52.058°N 1.266°E

Site history
- Built: 1917
- In use: January 1917 - 1963
- Battles/wars: First World War; European theatre of World War II; Cold War

Airfield information
- Elevation: 27 metres (89 ft) AMSL
Runways
Direction	Length and surface
00/00	Concrete/Tarmac
00/00	Concrete/Tarmac

Royal Air Force Martlesham Heath or more simply RAF Martlesham Heath is a former Royal Air Force station located 1.5 miles (2.4 km) southwest of Woodbridge, Suffolk, England. It was active between 1917 and 1963, and played an important role in the development of airborne radar.

== History ==
=== RFC/RAF prewar use ===
Martlesham Heath was first used as a Royal Flying Corps airfield during the First World War. In 1917 it became home to the Aeroplane Experimental Unit, RFC which moved from Upavon with the site named as the Aeroplane Experimental Station, next became the Aeroplane Experimental Establishment (Home) in 1920 and then the Aeroplane and Armament Experimental Establishment (A&AEE) in 1924. The A&AEE carried the evaluation and testing of many of the aircraft types and much of the armament and other equipment that would later be used during the Second World War.

No. 22 Squadron RAF and No. 15 Squadron RAF were present during the 1920s. No. 64 arrived in the 1930s.

=== RAF Fighter Command use ===
The A&AEE moved to RAF Boscombe Down on 9 September 1939 at the outbreak of the Second World War and Martlesham then became the most northerly station of No. 11 Group RAF, Fighter Command. Squadrons of Bristol Blenheim bombers, Hawker Hurricanes, Supermarine Spitfires and Hawker Typhoons operated from this airfield, and among the many pilots based there were such famous men as Robert Stanford Tuck, and Squadron Leader Douglas Bader, there as Commanding Officer of 242 Squadron. Ian Smith, the post-war Rhodesian prime minister, was at Martlesham for a time.

During the Battle of Britain, Anti-Aircraft (AA) defence for the area was the responsibility of the Harwich Gun Defence Area (GDA), manned by 99th (London Welsh) Heavy Anti-Aircraft Regiment, Royal Artillery. The GDA's main focus was on the Port of Harwich, and in July 1940 there were almost daily attacks on shipping off the East Coast, but 302 Heavy AA Battery also had a detachment stationed at Martlesham. The Luftwaffe began its offensive against RAF Fighter Command airfields in August.

On 15 August the experimental Fighter-bomber unit Erprobungsgruppe 210 attacked RAF Martlesham Heath and a neighbouring signal station. The Hurricanes of No. 17 Squadron stationed at Martlesham were some 20 miles (32 km) out to sea looking for the raid among the many traces being plotted by the radar stations. The raiders (nearly 40 mixed ground attack aircraft with fighter escort) slipped through and spent five minutes over the target, bombing and Strafing, while the HAA gun detachment got off five rounds of Shrapnel shell, which was all they had to use against low-level attack. The raiders then got away without loss, despite being engaged by the Harwich AA guns while withdrawing. The equivalent of seven Fighter Command squadrons had been ordered to intercept, but only a few reached Martlesham as the attackers were leaving. The damage to the airfield was extensive and took a full day to repair.

On 27 October 1940 another daylight raid was made on Martlesham by about 40 Messerschmitt Bf 109 fighter-bombers, which were engaged by the HAA guns on their way in and out. 99th HAA Regiment claimed that the raiders were disrupted by the fire, and the bomb damage was slight.

- No. 71 (Eagle) Squadron a squadron formed of American volunteers operated from the station in the middle and end of 1941.
- Air Sea Rescue Flight RAF, Martlesham Heath (1941) became 'A' Flight, No. 277 Squadron RAF.

=== USAAF use ===
In 1943, Martlesham Heath became one of a group of grass-surfaced airfields earmarked for use by fighters of the United States Army Air Forces (USAAF) Eighth Air Force. The airfield was assigned USAAF designation Station 369.

==== 356th Fighter Group ====
The airfield was opened in May 1943 and was first used by the United States Army Air Forces Eighth Air Force 356th Fighter Group, arriving from RAF Goxhill on 5 October 1943. The group was under the command of the 67th Fighter Wing of the VIII Fighter Command. Aircraft of the 356th were identified by a magenta/blue diamond pattern around their cowling.

The group consisted of the following squadrons:

- 359th Fighter Squadron (OC)
- 360th Fighter Squadron (PI)
- 361st Fighter Squadron (QI)

The 356th FG served in combat from October 1943, participating in operations that prepared for the invasion of the Continent, and supporting the landings in Normandy and the subsequent Allied drive across France and Germany.

The group flew Republic P-47 Thunderbolts until they were replaced by North American P-51 Mustangs in November 1944. From October 1943 until January 1944, they operated as escort for Boeing B-17 Flying Fortress/Consolidated B-24 Liberator bombers that attacked such objectives as industrial areas, missile sites, airfields, and communications.

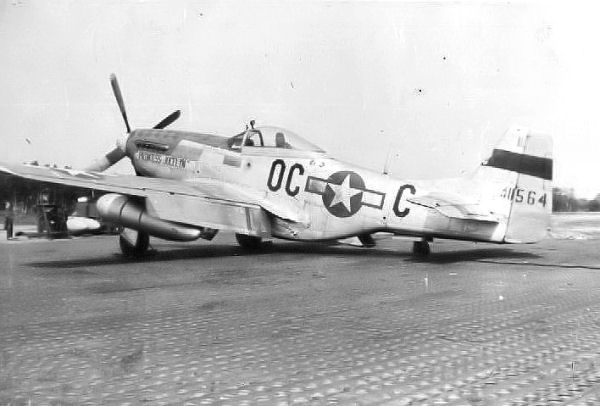
North American P-51 Mustang of the 359th Fighter Squadron at Martlesham Heath.

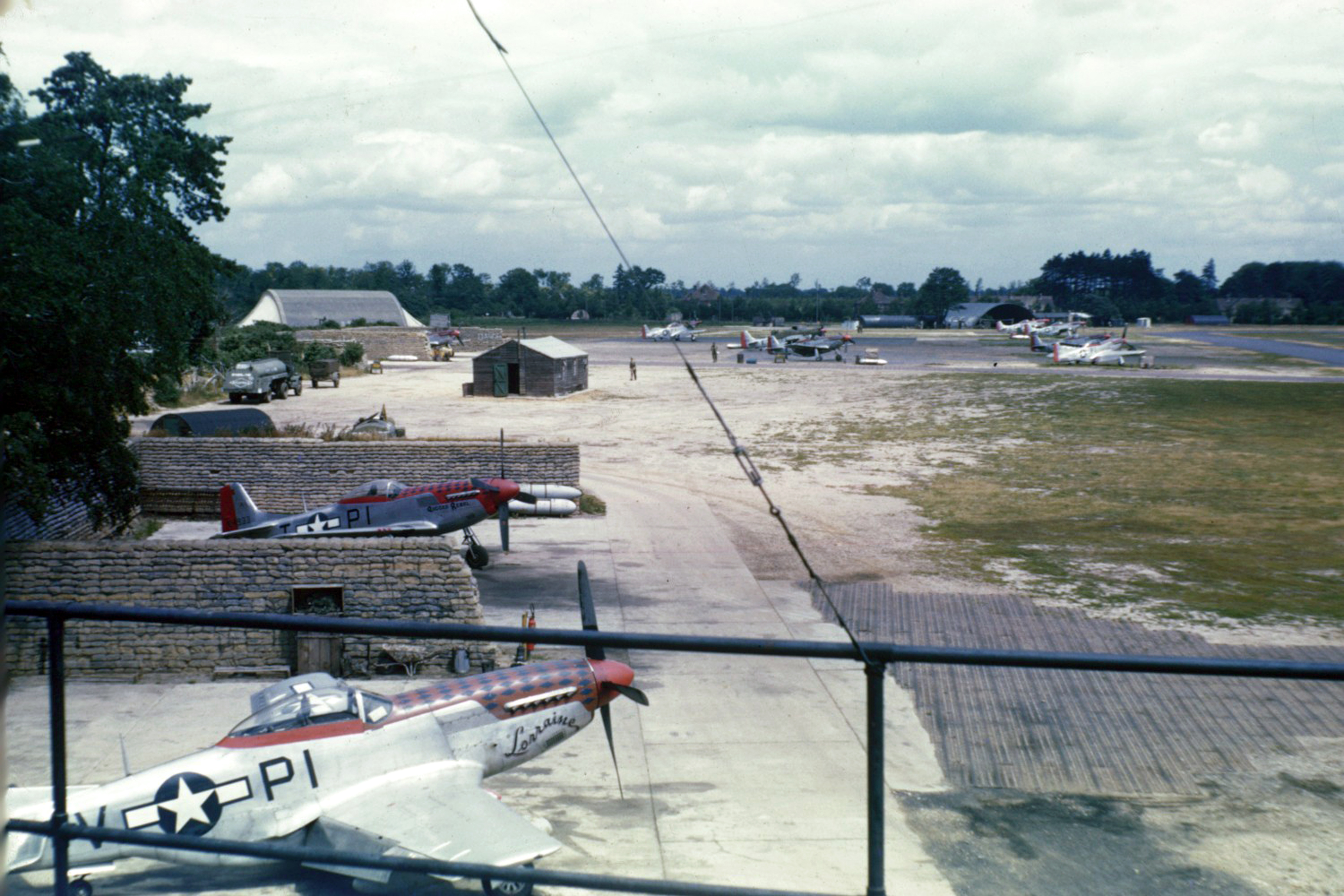
North American P-51s of the 360th Fighter Squadron in protective revetments at Martlesham Heath, 1944.

Fighters from the 356th engaged primarily in bombing and strafing missions after 3 January 1944, with its targets including U-boat installations, barges, shipyards, aerodromes, hangars, marshalling yards, locomotives, trucks, oil facilities, flak towers, and radar stations. Bombed and strafed in the Arnhem area on 17, 18, and 23 September 1944 to neutralize enemy gun emplacements, and received a Distinguished Unit Citation for this contribution to the airborne attack on the Netherlands.

The group flew its last combat mission, escorting B-17's dropping propaganda leaflets, on 7 May 1945. It returned to Camp Kilmer New Jersey and was inactivated on 10 November 1945.

=== Postwar RAF Fighter Command use ===
With the departure of the USAAF, the airfield reverted to the RAF. In the immediate postwar years, Fighter Command squadrons were in residence at Martlesham but the proximity to Ipswich and the physical limitations on lengthening the runways restricted jet operation. In an effort to improve the station the main runway was extended in 1955.

Early in 1946, the Bomb Ballistics and Blind Landing Unit moved in which, in 1950, was rechristened the Armament and Instrument Experimental Unit (A&IEU) remaining at Martlesham until disbanding in 1957.

An RAF Police flight had also occupied the station from 1951–1953. The following year, the A&IEU was disbanded and the station was retained in reserve status during which time an Air Sea Rescue helicopter unit was in residence.

In 1958, another Reserve Flight arrived and a Station HQ formed; No. 11 Group Communications flight moved in to be followed by HO No. 11 Group. These units were deactivated by the end of 1960. The Battle of Britain Memorial Flight moved to the airfield in 1958 and left in 1961. After this the airfield reverted to care and maintenance status before the Air Ministry closed the facility on 25 April 1963.

The USAF Radio Relay Station & R/T Exchange

In 1961 the US 3rd Air Force set up a radio signal station near the south-west corner of the airfield, just within Kesgrave parish, officially also called "Martlesham Heath". It relayed radio communication between the USAF and other US bases in the USA, Iceland, and the UK on the one hand, and Germany and Italy on the other. It linked via SHF voice and morse radio to Hillingdon, West London, and via large UHF tropo-scatter dishes to the ballistic early warning base at Fylingdales (Yorkshire), Flobecq (Belgium) and the Hook of Holland. Eventually, with additional capacity in mind, it acquired six steel masts. Its personnel were supplied from the nearby Bentwaters airbase. From 1966 its main building housed one of the two "AUTOVON" (US radio telephone automatic exchanges) in the UK. In June 1980, because of AFCC realignment in the UK, the squadron designation changed from Detachment 7,2130 Communications Squadron under RAF Croughton to Detachment 1,2164 Communications Squadron under RAF Bentwaters. Between 1988 and 1990 it progressively shut down, though the buildings and 3 masts remain. It is presently the home of the Suffolk Aviation Heritage Group Museum.

(Sources: 2130 & 2164 Comms Sq. Record Books at US Air Force Maxwell base; US Technical Defense Information Center website online Honeywell tropo-scatter studies; UK Home Office radio frequency records at UK National Archive; East Suffolk Aviation Society websites, including USAF veterans' contributions; East Anglian Daily Times).

- 'A' Flight & 'H' Flight of No. 1 Anti-Aircraft Co-operation Unit RAF
- No. 11 (Fighter) Group RAF
- No. 25 (Base) Defence Wing RAF
- No. 104 Gliding School RAF
- No. 612 Gliding School RAF
- No. 1488 (Fighter) Gunnery Flight RAF
- No. 1616 (Anti-Aircraft Co-operation) Flight RAF
- No. 2735 Squadron RAF Regiment
- No. 2787 Squadron RAF Regiment
- No. 2798 Squadron RAF Regiment
- No. 3203 Servicing Commando
- No. 3204 Servicing Commando
- No. 3206 Servicing Commando
- No. 3208 Servicing Commando
- No. 4025 Anti-Aircraft Flight RAF Regiment
- Autogiro Unit RAF part of No. 24 Squadron RAF
- Blind Landing Experimental Unit RAF
- Bomb Ballistics Unit RAF
- 'D' Flight RAF
- Experimental Armament Squadron RAF
- Experimental Co-operation Unit RAF (1938)
- Rapid Landing Flight RAF (1950-)
- Testing Squadron RAF (-1917)

== Current use ==
With the end of military control, Martlesham Heath has now become an industrial and dormitory satellite of Ipswich and the four prewar hangars and technical site buildings are now used for light industry and storage. Nearby, on the old RAF parade ground, stands a memorial erected to the memory of those members of the 356th Fighter Group who lost their lives in World War II. Part of the site of the airfield now contains the main headquarters building of the Suffolk Constabulary. The control tower from the airfield is maintained as a museum. In July 2017, a commemorative stone was unveiled on the village green outside the Douglas Bader public house. During the event, a Hurricane and Spitfire flew over the crowd to music by Vera Lynn.

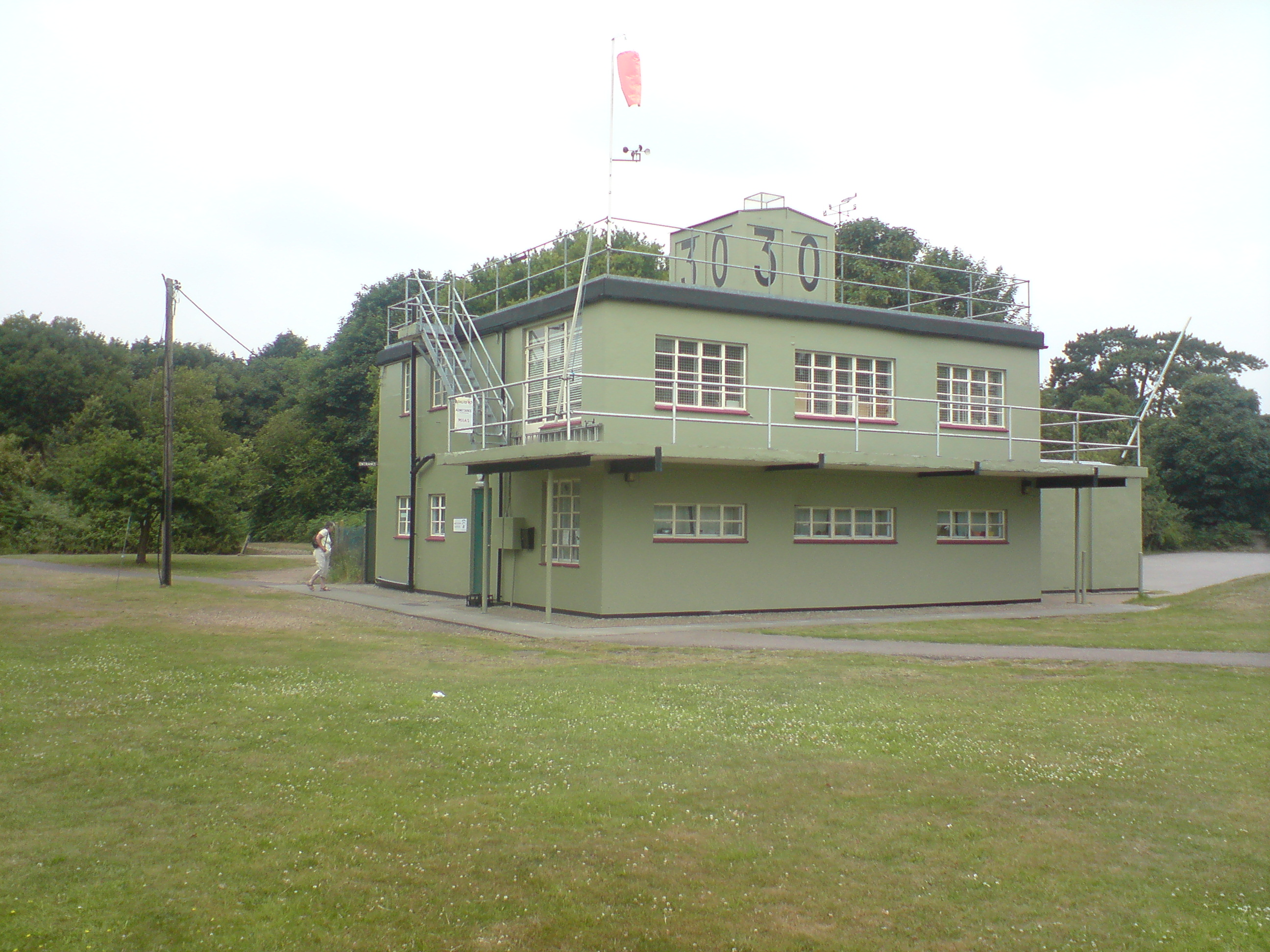
The control tower is now a museum.

== See also ==
- List of former Royal Air Force stations
- Adastral Park science campus
- Prince Obolensky
