= Childers =

Childers is an English surname. Notable people with the surname include:

- Abraham Childers (1750–1849), American politician and pioneer
- Alisa Childers (born 1975), American singer
- Ambyr Childers (born 1988), American actress
- Bob Childers (1946–2006), American country/folk singer-songwriter
- Buddy Childers (1926–2007), American jazz trumpeter
- Buddy Childers (politician) (1938–2026), American politician
- Ernest Childers (1918–2005), American Army officer
- Erskine Barton Childers (1929–1996), Irish UN civil servant
- Erskine Hamilton Childers (1905–1974), 4th President of Ireland (1973–1974)
- Francis Gracey Childers (1860–1921), American politician and general
- Hugh Childers (1827–1896), British and Australian Liberal statesman
- James Glenn Childers (1904–1968), American explorer and landowner
- Jason Childers (born 1975), American Major League baseball player
- Lawrence Childers (born 1944), American politician
- Linda Childers (1946–1970), American murder victim
- Mary Ann Childers, American television reporter
- Marvin Childers (born 1961), American politician, lawyer, and lobbyist
- Matt Childers (born 1978), American major League baseball player
- Michael Childers (1784–1854), British Army officer of the Napoleonic era
- Milly Childers (1866–1922), English painter
- Molly Childers (1875–1964), American-born Irish writer
- Naomi Childers (1892–1964), American silent film actress
- Nessa Childers (born 1956), Irish Member of the European Parliament
- Phillip Childers (1951–2010), American politician
- Rita Childers (1915–2010) First Lady of Ireland
- Robert Caesar Childers (1838–1876), British orientalist
- Robert Erskine Childers (1870–1922), author and Irish nationalist
- Robert L. Childers, Tennessee judge
- Rodney Childers (born 1976), American NASCAR crew chief
- Sam Childers (born 1962), American charity worker
- Thomas Childers (1946–2025), American historian and lecturer
- Travis Childers (born 1958), United States Representative, 1st District of Mississippi
- Tyler Childers (born 1991), American singer and songwriter
- W. D. Childers (born 1933), American politician, Member of the Florida Senate

== See also ==
- Childers, Queensland, a town in the Bundaberg Region, Australia
  - Childers Palace Backpackers Hostel fire
- Childers Hill, Tennessee, an unincorporated community in Hardin County, Tennessee
- Childers House, historic house on the grounds of Fort Campbell
- Childers reforms of the British army
- Flying Childers, undefeated 18th century thoroughbred racehorse
- HMAS Childers, a patrol boat of the Australian Navy
- HMS Childers, the name of five ships of the Royal Navy
- Karl Childers, the fictional protagonist of the film Sling Blade (1996)
