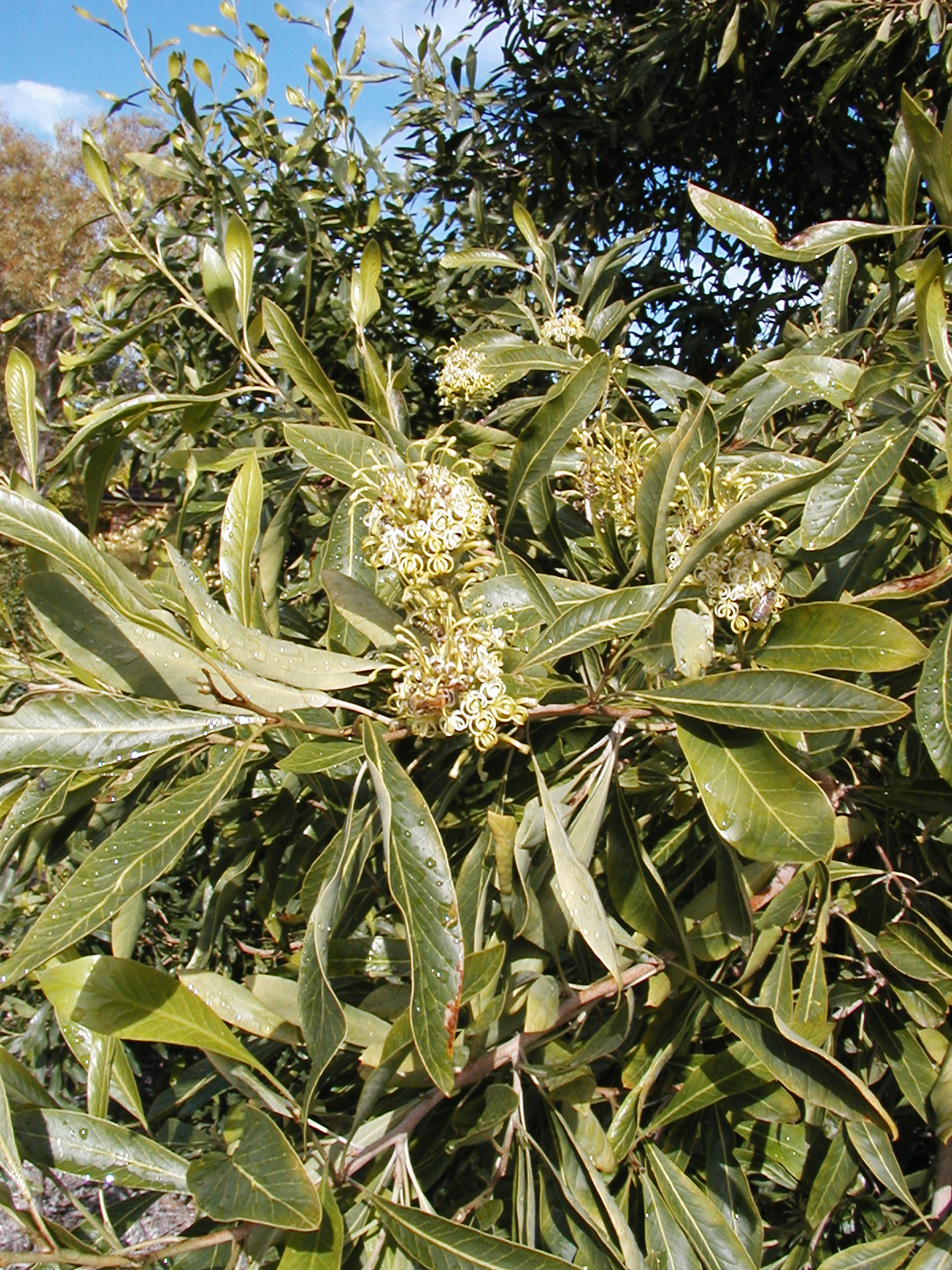

Conservation status
- Least Concern (IUCN 3.1)

Scientific classification
- Kingdom: Plantae
- Clade: Embryophytes
- Clade: Tracheophytes
- Clade: Angiosperms
- Clade: Eudicots
- Order: Proteales
- Family: Proteaceae
- Genus: Grevillea
- Species: G. helmsiae

Binomial name
- Grevillea helmsiae F.M.Bailey

= Grevillea helmsiae =

Species of shrub endemic to Queensland, Australia

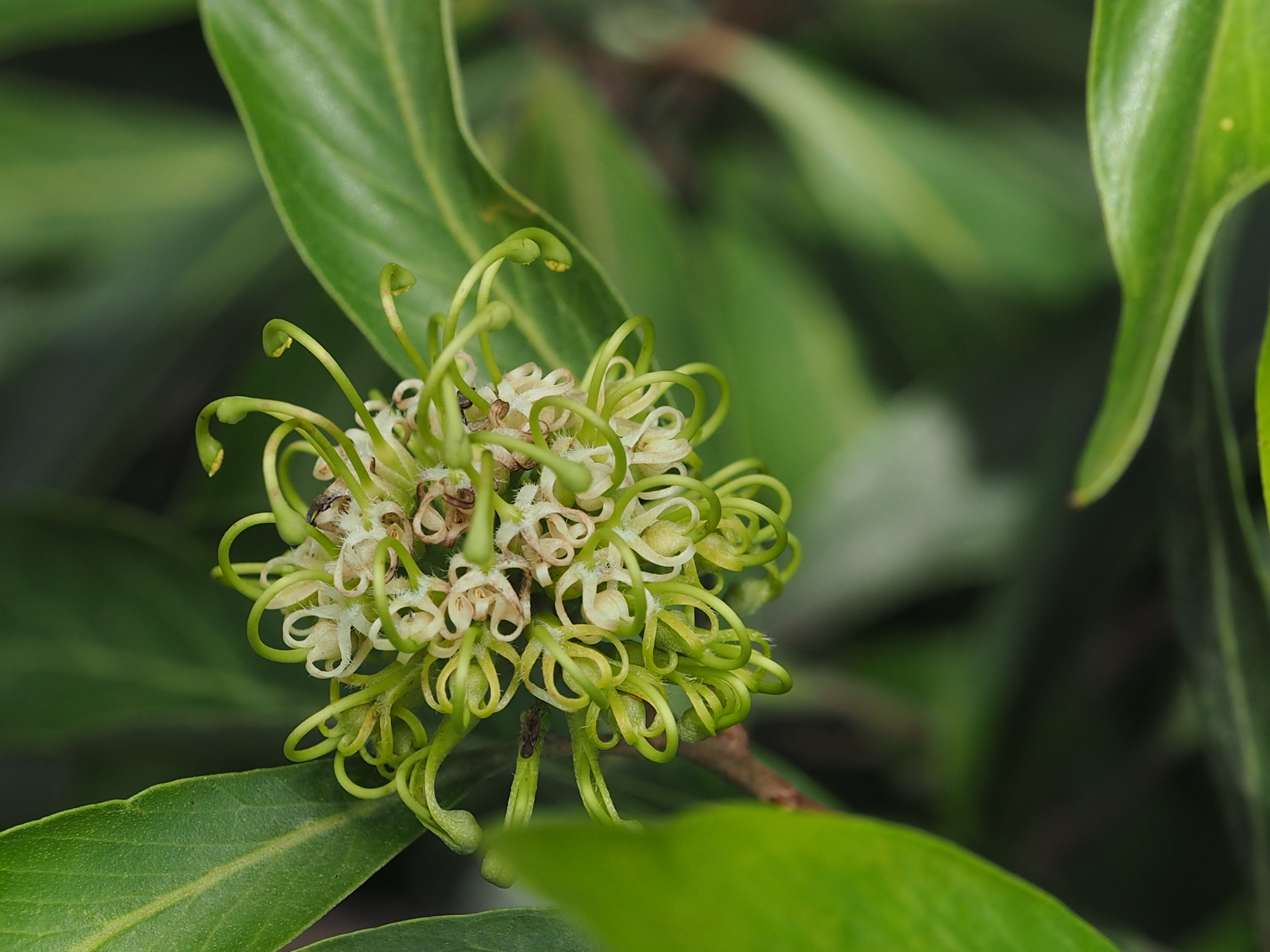
Inflorescence

Grevillea helmsiae, commonly known as Helms' grevillea, is a species of flowering plant in the family Proteaceae and is endemic to Queensland, Australia. It is a shrub or tree with elliptic to narrowly egg-shaped leaves with the narrower end towards the base and small clusters of white to cream-coloured flowers with a green style.

== Description ==
Grevillea helmsiae is a shrub or tree that typically grows to a height of 3–10 m (9.8–32.8 ft). Its leaves are elliptic to narrowly egg-shaped with the narrower end towards the base, 50–200 mm (2.0–7.9 in) long and 7–40 mm (0.28–1.57 in) wide, the lower surface silky-hairy. The flowers are arranged in small clusters 20–45 mm (0.79–1.77 in) long on the ends of branches, the rachis 4–20 mm (0.16–0.79 in) long. The flowers are white to cream-coloured with a green style, the pistil 12.5–20 mm (0.49–0.79 in) long and hairy. Flowering occurs from October to April and the fruit is a flattened elliptic follicle 20–31 mm (0.79–1.22 in) long.

== Taxonomy ==
Grevillea helmsiae was first formally described in 1899 by Frederick Manson Bailey in the Queensland Agricultural Journal from specimens collected near Childers by "Mrs. R. Helms". The specific epithet (helmsiae) honours Sabine Helms, who collected the type specimens.

== Distribution and habitat ==
Helms' grevillea grows on the edges of rainforest, in dry rainforest and brigalow communities in Queensland, south from Rockhampton.

== Conservation status ==
Grevillea helmsiae is currently listed as least concern on the IUCN Red List of Threatened Species, because it has a relatively widespread distribution and can be locally common. Although its population is declining, it is currently not to an extent that would warrant a threatened or near-threatened category. Land clearing for agriculture, hoop pine plantations and especially infrastructure development in the southernmost part of its distribution near Brisbane are responsible for this decline, as well as competition from invasive weeds. As the species is not currently threatened and occurs within multiple protected areas, additional conservation measures are not required.
