= Francis Gracey Childers =

American military officer and politician

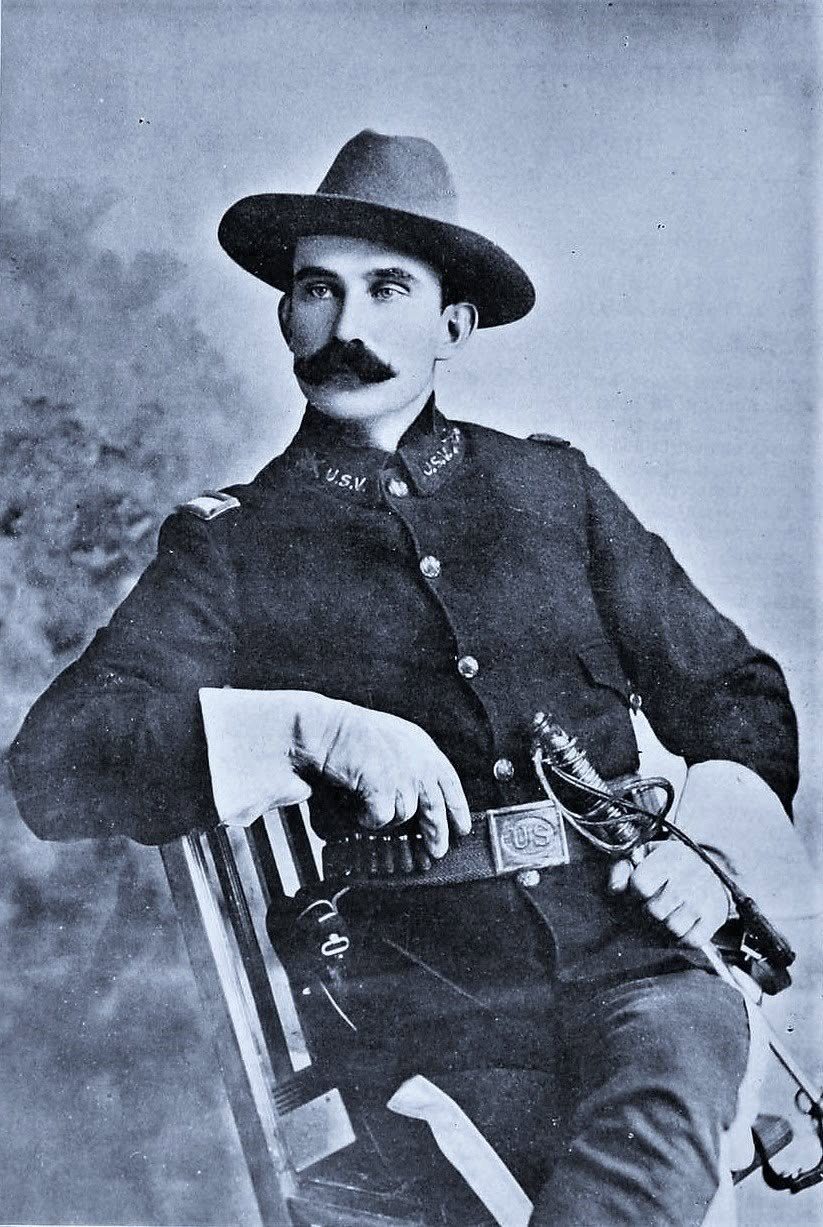
- Childers in uniform, c. 1899

32nd Sheriff of Montgomery County
- In office January 1913 – January 1921
- Preceded by: Robert L. Black
- Succeeded by: Oscar D. Johnson

48th Adjutant General of Tennessee
- In office February 1909 – August 1910
- Governor: Malcolm R. Patterson
- Preceded by: Tully Brown
- Succeeded by: Frank Maloney

Member-elect of the U.S. House of Representatives from Tennessee's 6th district
- Declined to serve
- Preceded by: John W. Gaines
- Succeeded by: Jo Byrns

Member of the Tennessee House of Representatives
- In office 1903–1907

Mayor of Clarksville, Tennessee
- In office 1900–1902
- Preceded by: N. L. Carney
- Succeeded by: W. B. Young

Personal details
- Born: Francis Gracey Childers; July 4, 1860 Eddyville, Kentucky, U.S.
- Died: March 18, 1921 (aged 60) Clarksville, Tennessee, U.S.
- Resting place: Mount Olivet Cemetery
- Party: Democratic
- Spouse: Jane Gray Glenn (m. 1900)
- Children: 3
- Relatives: Abraham Childers (great-grandfather)
- Education: Rhodes College

Military service
- Allegiance: United States
- Branch/service: United States Army
- Years of service: 1888–1910
- Rank: Brigadier General
- Unit: Tennessee Army National Guard
- Commands: Tennessee Military Department; 1st Tennessee Volunteer Infantry Regiment
- Battles/wars: Spanish–American War; Philippine–American War; Battle of Manila; Battle of the Visayas; Tobacco Wars
- Awards: Distinguished Service Cross

Francis Gracey Childers (July 4, 1860 – March 18, 1921) was an American politician, businessman, and U.S. Army officer who served as the 48th adjutant general of Tennessee from 1909 to 1910. A member of the Democratic Party, he previously served as a member of the Tennessee House of Representatives from 1903 to 1907, and as the mayor of Clarksville, Tennessee from 1900 to 1902. Following his death, Childers was described by the Pittsburgh Post-Gazette as "one of the most popular men of the day in Tennessee."

Born and raised in eastern Kentucky, Childers moved to Tennessee and graduated from Rhodes College. After working in the railroad and steamboat industry, he joined the Tennessee Army National Guard as a lieutenant colonel in 1888. He was mustered into regular service during the Spanish–American War and served in combat during the Philippine–American War at the battles of Manila and Visayas. In November 1899, Childers retired from active duty and returned to his plantation in the Appalachian Mountains. In 1900, he published his war memoir, Red Tides of Manila, which garnered widespread popularity and critical acclaim.

After serving for several years in local government, Childers was elected to the Tennessee General Assembly in 1902. He supported segregation, prohibition, and antitrust legislation before retiring from the state legislature in 1907. He was elected to the U.S. Congress in 1908, but declined to take his seat in order to serve as adjutant general of Tennessee. During the 1910 Tennessee elections, Childers was a leading candidate for governor of Tennessee, challenging incumbent Malcolm R. Patterson. Following a contentious primary, Childers and Patterson both withdrew from the race to support a compromise candidate—Robert Love Taylor—who would go on to lose to Republican nominee Ben W. Hooper. From 1912 to 1920, Childers served as Sheriff of Montgomery County, Tennessee. He was appointed by the United States Secretary of War to serve as the presiding officer of the county draft board during World War I. At the time of his death in 1921, Childers was widely considered the front-runner in the 1922 Tennessee gubernatorial election.

== Early life, education, and career ==
Francis Gracey Childers was born on July 4, 1860, in Eddyville, Kentucky, to Reverend James Francis Childers and Lucy (née Gracey) Childers. His paternal grandfather was William C. Childers, son of Abraham Childers. Childers was raised in Kentucky before attending college in Tennessee.

Childers was educated at the Southwestern Presbyterian University (now Rhodes College) in Memphis, Tennessee. After college, he worked for many years at F. P. Gracey & Bro, a grain, steamboat, and railroad company.

Returning from the war, Childers wrote his memoir, Red Tides of Manila, over the course of several months in the Clarksville area. The book was published by Macmillan and became an instant bestseller; notable literary critics positively reviewed the work. After its release, Childers gained national fame for his exploits.

In 1907, Childers established the Childers Ordinance Company, a munitions manufacturing company which supplied the Tennessee National Guard and State Guard.

In 1911, Childers joined the board of directors of The Tennessean, a local newspaper founded by future Senator Luke Lea. He published a monthly column from 1911 to 1913.

== Military service ==
In 1888, Childers accepted a commission in Tennessee's Army National Guard as Lieutenant Colonel of the 1st Tennessee Volunteer Infantry Regiment.

=== Camp Merritt ===
During the Spanish–American War, the 1st Tennessee Infantry was activated by the United States Volunteers, transferred to Camp Merritt, California, and deployed to the Philippines in 1898. During the First Tennessee's five-month assignment in California, the regiment became embroiled in a "series of scandals" regarding the issue of racism. In August 1898, "nearly half the regiment" attempted to lynch a Black San Franciscan man named Daniel Thomas. The regiment was widely condemned by military leadership; General Henry C. Merriam described the events as a "deplorable occurrence" and "a thing never before known in the history of the United States Army." The San Francisco Call published a political cartoon criticizing the regiment, titled: "Fiery Southerners Bring Their Race War to the Golden Gate." Colonel William Crawford Smith issued a public apology for the "unfortunate occurrence," while Lt Colonel Childers defended the soldiers' actions, saying: "The negroes are themselves greatly to blame for the violence bestowed upon one of their number yesterday."

=== Philippine–American War ===
The 1st Tennessee Infantry Regiment arrived in Manila on December 6, 1898. The unit served as part of the Eighth Army Corps. During the Philippine–American War, Childers fought in the Battle of Manila. On February 5, 1899, during the second day of the battle, Childers was promoted to Colonel of the 1st Tennessee Infantry, following the death of Colonel William Crawford Smith. He was formally promoted by Governor Benton McMillin two weeks later. Under his command were 45 officers, 619 enlisted men, 101 prisoners of war, and 24 discharged soldiers. Childers commanded the regiment during combat engagements on the islands of Luzon, Panay, and Cebu. From September 21 to 25, 1899, Childers commanded a five-day expedition into the Cebu mountains and captured seven enemy forts. He also led the regiment during the Battle of the Visayas, capturing Iloilo City.

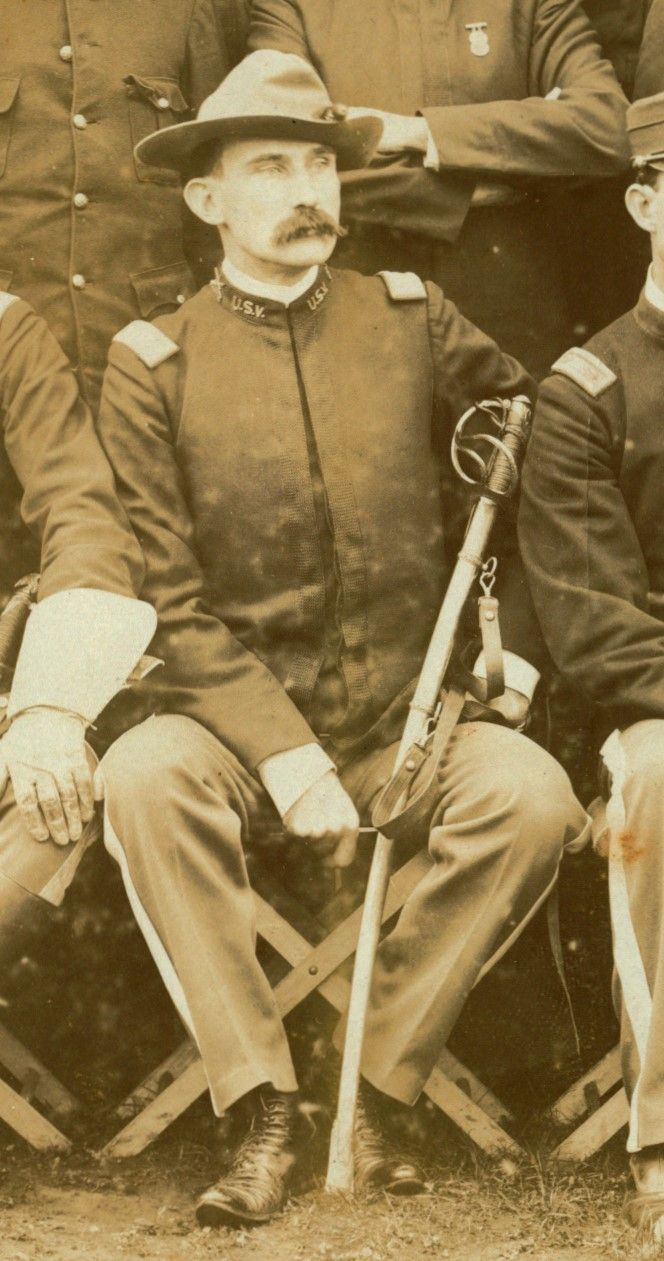
Colonel Childers on deployment in the Philippines, 1899

Childers served as colonel of the 1st Tennessee Infantry Regiment until he was discharged from active duty in San Francisco, California, on November 23, 1899. Upon the regiment's arrival in San Francisco Bay, Childers and his men were greeted by former Governor Henry Markham and Congressman John W. Gaines. Prior to his discharge, Governor McMillin, Senator William B. Bate, Senator Thomas B. Turley, and Robert Love Taylor petitioned President William McKinley to appoint Childers as a brevet brigadier general. During the war, the 1st Tennessee Volunteer Infantry Regiment was the only regiment from the American South to serve in the Philippines, the only regiment from Tennessee to engage in combat, and the last volunteer regiment to leave the Philippine Islands. The San Francisco Chronicle and the El Paso Herald described the First Tennessee as "the most remarkable regiment of the Philippine War."

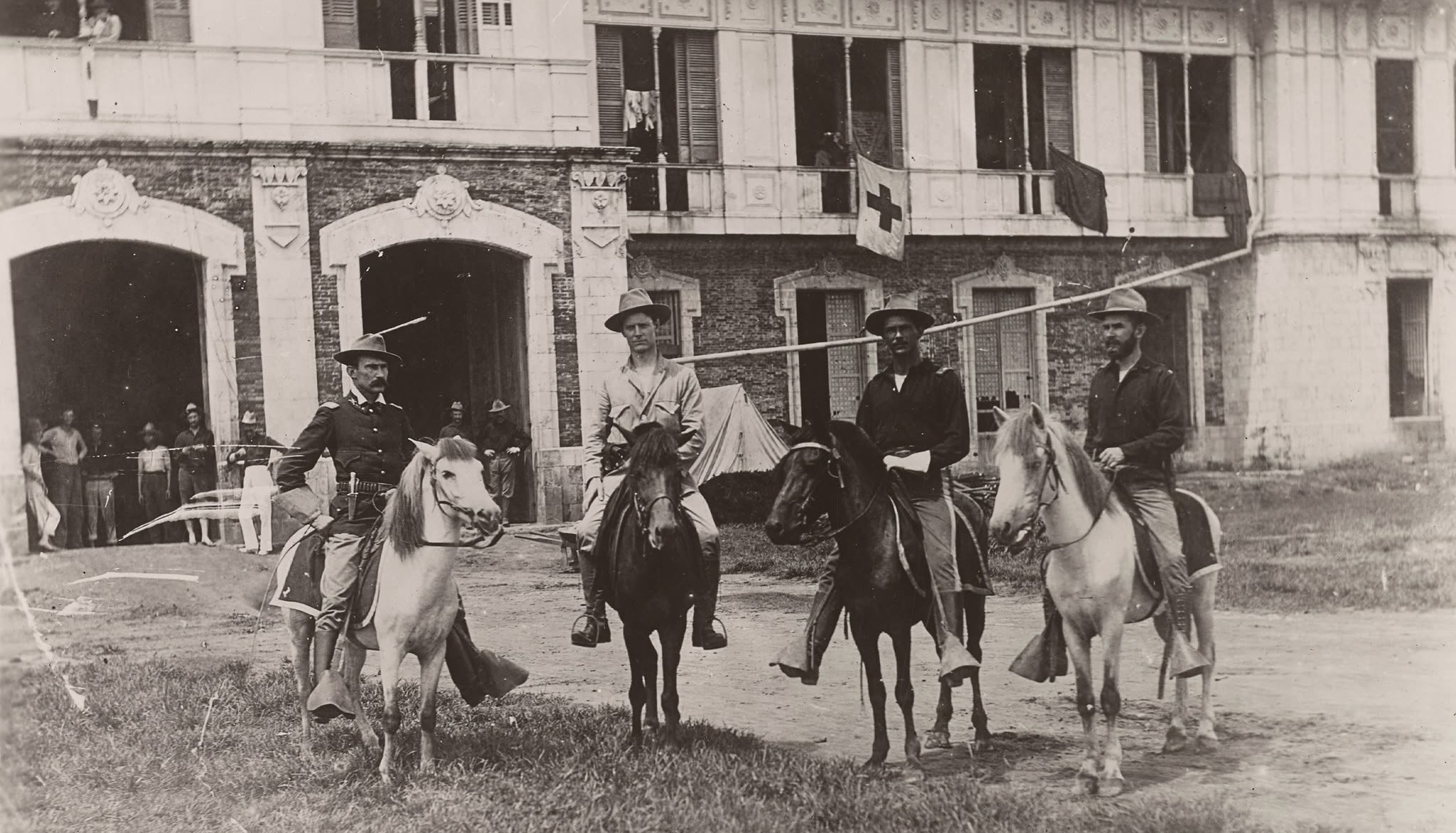
Childers on horseback (far left) with Senator Albert J. Beveridge (second from the left) at the University of San Agustin in Iloilo City, Philippine Islands, c. 1899–1900.

=== Tennessee National Guard leadership ===
During the Tobacco Wars, Childers commanded federal troops against the Night Riders in 1908 and 1909.

In February 1909, Colonel Tully Brown resigned as Tennessee's adjutant general following an investigation into the death of former Senator Edward W. Carmack. That same month, Childers was appointed by Governor Malcolm R. Patterson as the 48th adjutant general of Tennessee. During his tenure, he instituted military exercises to simulate battlefield conditions for infantry units. In August 1910, Childers resigned as adjutant general and was succeeded by Brigadier General Frank Maloney.

Childers was honorably discharged from the Tennessee National Guard in 1910, attaining the rank of brigadier general. During his military service, he received the Certificate of Merit (later the Distinguished Service Cross), the Philippine Congressional Medal, the Philippine Campaign Medal, and the Spanish War Service Medal.

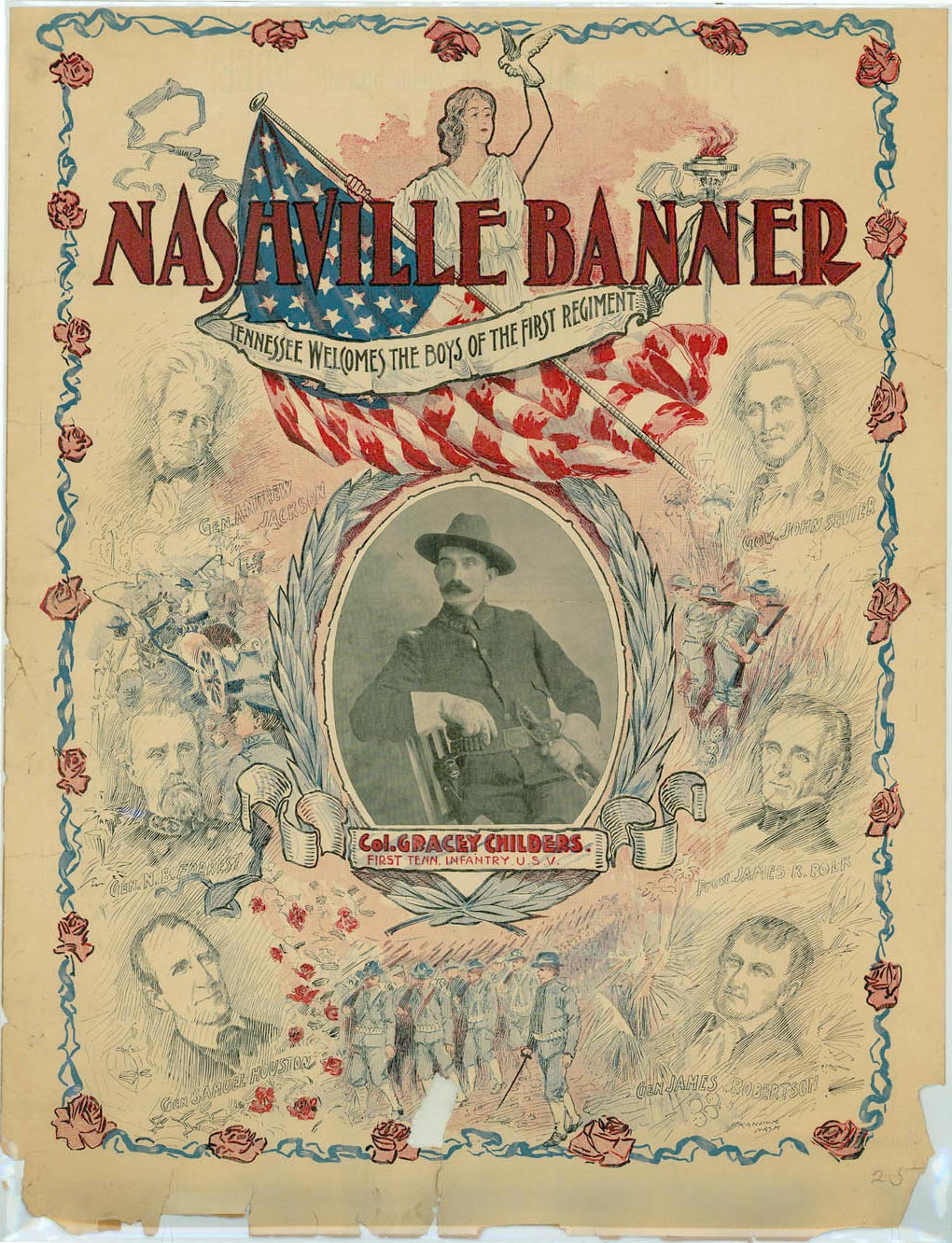
Nashville Banner poster of Childers featured alongside other notable Tennesseans: John Sevier, James K. Polk, James Robertson, Sam Houston, N. B. Forrest, and Andrew Jackson.

In 1901, Childers and other surviving veterans of the 1st Tennessee Volunteer Infantry Regiment were honored at the Tennessee State Capitol. The event was attended by President William McKinley, Governor Benton McMillin, and Bishop Thomas F. Gailor.

== Political career ==
=== Government of Clarksville (1890–1902) ===
Childers first entered elected politics as an alderman of Clarksville, Tennessee. He represented the second ward from 1890 to 1896, and again from 1898 to 1900.

In 1900, Childers was elected as the mayor of Clarksville, succeeding N. L. Carney. He served a singe two-year term before retiring to run for the State House in 1902; he was succeeded by W. B. Young.

=== Tennessee House of Representatives (1903–1907) ===
In 1902, Childers was elected to the Tennessee House of Representatives as a Democrat, taking office in 1903. During his tenure, he voted for legislation supporting racial segregation, school segregation, prohibition, and antitrust law. In April 1905, he voted to adopt the official flag of Tennessee. Childers was re-elected in 1904, but did not seek re-election in 1906.

=== 1908 U.S. House of Representatives election ===
In 1908, Childers won the Democratic nomination for the U.S. House of Representatives in Tennessee's 6th congressional district, defeating incumbent John W. Gaines. In the general election, Childers' only opponent was Socialist Party candidate E. D. Morgan. In November 1908, Childers won the election in a landslide, receiving 97.29% of the vote. During the transition, Childers was offered the military post of state adjutant general and assumed command in February 1909. In accepting the position, Childers declined his seat in the U.S. House of Representatives. His successor, Jo Byrns, was chosen at a state party convention and assumed office at the beginning of the 61st United States Congress—the term Childers was elected to serve.

=== 1910 Tennessee gubernatorial election ===
In 1910, Childers was a candidate for governor of Tennessee as an "independent Democrat," following Governor Patterson's refusal to accept a statewide primary election. During the campaign, the issues of state primaries and prohibition dominated the political discourse. Childers supported both issues and his faction of the state party declined to support Patterson. After negotiations, Patterson and Childers both withdrew from the race, allowing for the nomination of a compromise candidate—Robert Love Taylor—before Election Day. In the aftermath of the highly contested Democratic primary, Republican nominee Ben W. Hooper won the general election, becoming the first Republican elected statewide since 1880.

=== Sheriff of Montgomery County (1913–1921) ===
In 1912, Childers was elected as the 32nd sheriff of Montgomery County, Tennessee, succeeding Sheriff Robert L. Black. He took office in January 1913, and was subsequently elected to four two-year terms as sheriff. During his tenure, he arrested multiple people for bootlegging and was wounded in a shootout with bank robbers in 1916. After choosing to not seek re-election in 1920, Childers was succeeded by Oscar D. Johnson and left office in January 1921.

=== U.S. Department of War ===
Prohibited from active service in World War I due to his age, Childers was appointed by Secretary of War Newton D. Baker as Chairman of the Montgomery County War Board—the countywide draft board. In this position, he was praised by the local press for his "impartiality" in administering the draft.

=== 1922 Tennessee gubernatorial election ===
In January 1921, at the annual reunion dinner of surviving First Tennessee veterans, Childers announced his intention to run for Tennessee governor in 1922; he was considered the likely frontrunner by The Tennessean, Chattanooga Times, Leaf-Chronicle, and Nashville Banner.

== Personal life and death ==
Childers was Methodist. He is a paternal great-grandson of Kentucky senator Abraham Childers. He is also a 2x great-grandson of Colonel James Patton. In 1890, Childers purchased Oak Top mansion in Clarksville. He was a member of the Sons of the American Revolution, Military Order of Foreign Wars, Knights of Pythias, Benevolent and Protective Order of Elks, and United Spanish War Veterans.

On November 14, 1900, Childers married Jane Gray Glenn in Nashville, Tennessee. The couple had three sons, but only one survived childhood: James Glenn Childers.

The community of Childers Hill, Tennessee, was named in honor of Childers. In 1908, a steamship was named in honor of Childers; the Gracey Childers sailed twice weekly from Nashville, Tennessee, to Paducah, Kentucky.

At 7:15 pm on March 18, 1921, Childers died from "malady," aged 60, in Clarksville, Tennessee. He was buried in a military funeral at Greenwood Cemetery in Clarksville. The ceremony was attended by "over one thousand" mourners, including former Governor Albert H. Roberts and U.S. Senator Kenneth McKellar. In 1929, Childers was reinterred at Mount Olivet Cemetery in Nashville.

== See also ==
- Lawrence Tyson
- George W. Gordon
- Theodore Roosevelt
