= Battle of Balantang =

- Part of the Visayan theater of Philippine–American War
Date	March 10, 1899
Location	Balantang, Jaro, Iloilo Philippines
Result	Filipino victory
Territorial changes	Filipino forces retake Jaro

Belligerents
Philippine Republic	United States

Commanders and leaders
Pascual Magbanua; Teresa Magbanua	Unknown

Strength
1,000	600

Casualties and losses
unknown	400 killed and wounded

The Battle of Balantang, also known as the Second Battle of Jaro, was fought in the early stages of the Philippine–American War. It was an organized counterattack by Filipino forces on U.S. forces that was executed on March 10, 1899, which resulted in the retaking the town of Jaro on the island of Panay in the Philippines. Filipino revolutionaries led by General Pascual Magbanua together with his sister Teresa Magbanua launched an attack, despite the disadvantages in training and equipment. The battle resulted in Philippine forces retaking Jaro from U.S forces. The number of Filipino casualties was not recorded. Because of her valor, Teresa Magbanua was given a prominent place in the celebration, and led her troops into the city while riding upon a white horse.
