= Robert L. Childers =

American judge

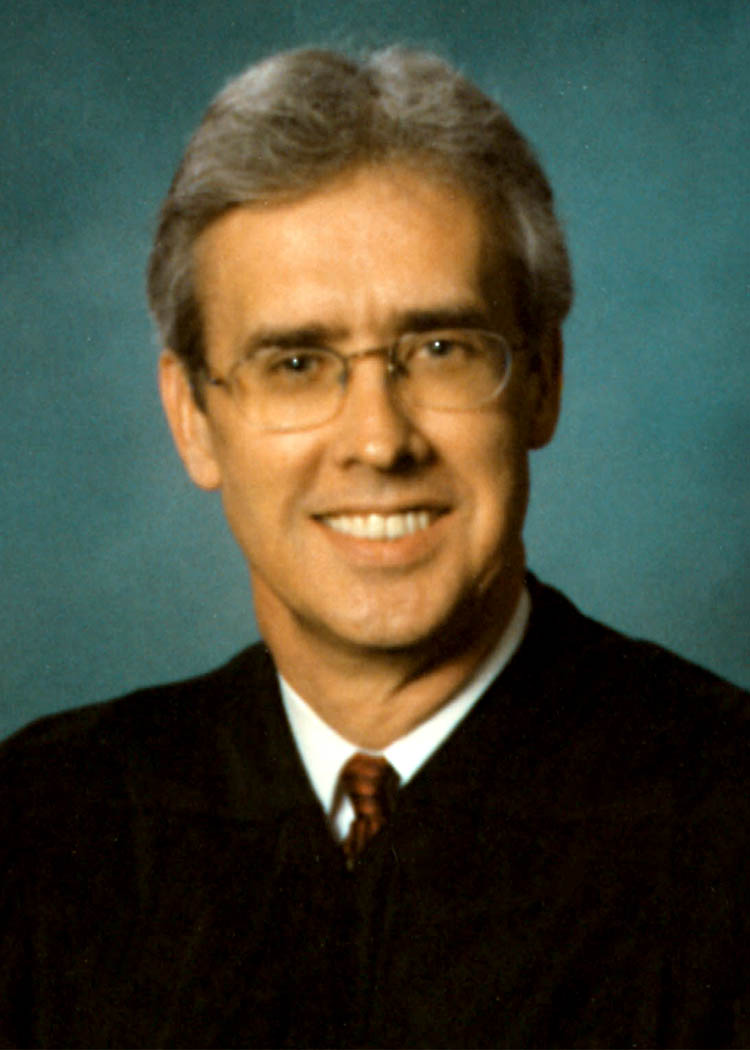
- Official portrait, 2012

Judge of the Tennessee Circuit Court
- In office 1984 – June 30, 2017

Personal details
- Born: March 12, 1948 (age 78) Tennessee, U.S.
- Party: Independent
- Spouse: Amy Amundsen
- Education: University of Memphis (BBA, JD)

Robert L. Childers (born March 12, 1948) is an American lawyer and retired jurist who served as a judge of the Tennessee Circuit Court for the 30th Judicial District in Memphis from 1984 to 2017.

== Early life and education ==
Childers was born on March 12, 1948, in Tennessee. He graduated from the University of Memphis with a bachelor of Business Administration in 1971. Childers earned his Juris Doctor from the Cecil C. Humphreys School of Law in 1974.

== Career ==
Prior to his election to the state bench, Childers worked as an attorney in private practice from 1975 to 1984.

In 1984, Childers was elected to the 30th Judicial District of the Tennessee Circuit Court as an independent, representing Shelby County, Tennessee. He was re-elected in 1990, 1998, 2006, and 2014.

From 1989 to 1990, and again from 1997 to 1998, Childers served as the Presiding Judge of the 30th Judicial District, elected by his fellow judges.

In 2003, Judge Childers was designated by the Tennessee Supreme Court to preside over the widely publicized Anna Mae He case. In a controversial ruling, Childers terminated the birth parents' parental rights. The ruling was subsequently affirmed by a majority in the Tennessee Court of Appeals, but was reversed by the Tennessee Supreme Court in 2007.

Childers retired from the bench on June 30, 2017.

== Personal life ==
Childers is married to his wife, Amy J. Amundsen. He is a patrilineal descendant of Abraham Childers and grandson of Francis Gracey Childers.
