= Sabine Helms =

Danish amateur botanist (1866–1929)

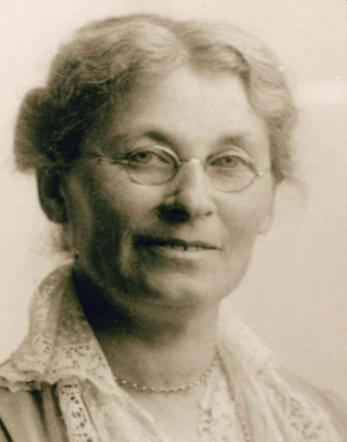
Sabine Helms.

Sabine Helms (née Hannemann; 1866-1929) was a Danish amateur botanist who engaged in the study and illustration of the local flora after emigrating to Australia. Two Australian plant species and the Helms Scrub Reserve are named after her.

== Biography ==
Sabine Helms was born in Middelfart, Denmark. She was the daughter of Daniel Wilhelm Rudolph Hannemann (1829-1875) and Johanne Jeanette Bernhardine Hannemann (née Løw, 1841–1919). Her father, an engineer, worked on the construction of the Funen–Jutland railway when she was born. He would later serve as secretary of the Royal Danish Agricultural Society. She married Rudolph Andreas Christian Helms (1854-1940). He was the son of pharmacist in Varde and on Fanø Andreas Fridsch Helms (1808-1880) and Margrethe Adamine Juliane (née Holst, 1828–1857).

Sabine Helms moved to Huxley (near Childers) in the Isis district of Queensland in 1895 when her husband was appointed the first manager of the CSR sugar mill. They remained in the area until 1912. Together, they had three children.

Prior to their departure, Helms had followed lectures in botany at the University of Copenhagen. After moving to Queensland she engaged in the study of the local flora, both as a collector and illustrator. She made scientific illustrations of over 90 plant species and left a herbarium of over 4,000 specimens.

== Legacy ==
Two plant species, Grevillea helmsiae and Geigers helmsiae, were named for her by Frederick Manson Bailey. A painting by her of Geigera was used by him as an illustration in The Queensland Flora (1899-1902). Helms Scrub Reserve has been named in honour of Mrs Helms by Isis Shire Council. Some of her work as a botanical artist is kept at the Royal Botanic Gardens Library in Sydney.
