= Battle of the Visayas (1899) =

- Part of Philippine–American War
Date	March 10, 1899 – March 5, 1901
Location	Visayas
Result	American victory
Territorial changes	The Americans occupied the Visayas region

Belligerents
1899–1901; United States: (United States) Military Government of the Philippine Islands	1899; Federal State of the Visayas: Visayas District; Bohol; Negros; Cebu; 1899–1901; Philippine Republic: Negros Republic

Commanders and leaders
(United States) Gracey Childers (United States) Frank Ross McCoy (United States) J. T. Sweeney (United States) Thomas W. Connell	Dionisio Seguela (First Philippine Republic) Pacsual Magbanua (First Philippine Republic) Teresa Magbanua (First Philippine Republic) Vicente Lukbán (First Philippine Republic) Domingo Rebadulla (First Philippine Republic) Captain Gregorio Casenas

Strength
Unknown	Unknown

Casualties and losses
Not defined	Not defined

The Battle of the Visayas (1899) (Filipino: Labanan sa Visayas, Cebuano: Gubat sa Visayas, Hiligaynon: Gubat sang Visayas, Spanish: Batalla de las Visayas) was fought between the Philippine Republic and the United States from March 10, 1899 to March 5, 1901 and this is part of the Philippine–American War. The battle was waged to capture the Visayas region in the Philippine Islands by the Americans.

== See also ==
- Negros Revolution
- History of the Philippines
