= Tennessee Emergency Management Agency =

- Tennessee Emergency Management Agency logo (2003-2016)

Agency overview
- Preceding agency: Office of Civil Defense
- Jurisdiction: State of Tennessee
- Headquarters: 3041 Sidco Dr. Nashville, TN 37204-1502
- Motto: "Failure is Not an Option"
- Employees: 140 (FY2025)
- Annual budget: $21,844,600 (FY25)
- Agency executive: Patrick C. Sheehan, TEMA Director
- Parent department: Tennessee Military Department

The Tennessee Emergency Management Agency (TEMA) is an agency of Tennessee government tasked with coordinating the state government's preparation for, response to, and recovery from natural and man-made disasters across the state of Tennessee. The agency is headquartered in Nashville, Tennessee, with four regional offices in Jackson, Nashville, Knoxville, and Chattanooga. TEMA is a component of the Tennessee Military Department, along with the Tennessee National Guard (Tennessee Army National Guard and Tennessee Air National Guard) and the Tennessee State Guard.

In July 2026, TEMA will become the Department of the Tennessee Emergency Management Authority, a Cabinet-level department of state government.

== History ==
The Office of Civil Defense (OCD) was established in 1951 with the primary purpose of preparing civil defense plans in the event of nuclear weapons being detonated in Tennessee during a hypothetical war between the United States and the Soviet Union. This continued to be the main focus of the agency through the 1960s as the OCD prepared the Tennessee Plan for the Management of Resources, a plan designed to manage resources after a nuclear strike. In 1984, after the Waverly, Tennessee, tank car explosion, the Office of Civil Defense was renamed the Tennessee Emergency Management Agency and assigned its first civilian director.

During the 2026 legislative session, the Tennessee General Assembly approved legislation to establish the Department of the Tennessee Emergency Management Authority (TEMA), moving TEMA out of the Department of the Military and elevating it to Cabinet-level status. This change will make the Director of TEMA the Commissioner of TEMA. The change will take effect on July 1, 2026.

== Organizational structure ==
=== Executive Office ===
The Executive Office is composed of the Director of TEMA and the Director's Administrative Assistant. The Director is responsible for setting the Agency's overall policies, goals, and objectives and ensuring their achievement. The Director is appointed by the Governor. When TEMA is not activated, the Director reports to the Tennessee Adjutant General as Commissioner of the Department of the Military. When activated, however, the Director reports directly to the Governor, coordinating with the Adjutant General when the Military Department's assistance is required. By statute, the Director is the State Coordinating Officer and Governor's Authorized Representative during a federally declared disaster. While the Governor may declare a state of emergency through executive order, the Director may also do so by activating the Tennessee Emergency Management Plan.

=== Executive Command Staff ===
The executive command staff is composed of five executive positions given the following roles:

- Chief of Staff / Assistant Director for Administration and Mission Support: The Chief of Staff coordinates the Agency's daily operations. As Assistant Director for Administration and Mission Support, the Chief of Staff oversees the teams responsible for administrative actions, finances, human resources, and operational support. Specific duties include logistics and telecommunications.
- Assistant Director for Operations and Field Services
- Assistant Director for Mitigation and Recovery
- Assistant Director for Preparedness
- Executive Officer for Communications & External Affairs: This individual is responsible for ensuring accurate, reliable information is communicated to the public in the preparation for, response to, and recovery from an emergency. The position takes the lead on developing campaigns for public awareness and education, and works with the Governor's Office and other state agencies to provide a unified messaging effort during an emergency situation.

=== TEMA Divisions and Branches ===
TEMA is divided into four divisions, which each contain several branches, sections, and teams within them.

==== PREPAREDNESS DIVISION ====
The division handles the planning and implementation of exercises and simulations designed to prepare first responders both inside and outside of the agency for emergency situations. The division also provides training on specific emergency management skills.

===== Planning Branch =====
This branch is responsible for updating and maintaining the Tennessee Emergency Management Plan (TEMP), reviewing local hazard mitigation and basic emergency operations plans, assisting state and local entities with creating and maintaining emergency plans, and conducting an annual assessment of the State's emergency preparedness. Planning staff are also located in each regional office to assist local governments in their planning efforts.

===== Training Branch =====
The Training Branch creates and manages the statewide emergency management training program for state, local, and other stakeholders.

===== Exercise Branch =====
The Exercise Branch runs TEMA's exercise programs. This includes creating the program and other regular exercises and preparing the after-action report to identify shortcomings and successes and plan how to improve moving forward.

===== Technical Hazards Branch =====
This branch is responsible for the statewide coordination of radiological protection activities. It also coordinates response plans for TVA sites at Watts Bar and Sequoyah and the Oak Ridge National Laboratory.

==== OPERATIONS AND FIELD SERVICES DIVISION ====
This division provides and manages the networks necessary to provide support and assistance to local officials during the response to an emergency. It is divided into three branches.

===== Operations Branch =====
This branch's main function is to ensure a central network for providing assistance to and communications with local governments. It includes the State Watch Point, staffed 24/7/365. The Watch Point acts as the state's central point for local governments reporting can emergency event or activity and will ensure the relevant individuals are notified in the event of an incident.

===== Field Services Branch =====
This branch includes TEMA's field staff assigned as liaisons to local governments statewide. These individuals are the Agency's first line of support in for preparation and education or the event of an incident. Field services staff work out of the Agency's four regional offices in Jackson (West Region), Nashville (Middle Region), Chattanooga (Southeast Region), and Knoxville (East Region).

==== MITIGATION AND RECOVERY DIVISION ====
The Mitigation and Recovery Division includes three branches: Public Assistance, Hazard Mitigation, and Unmet Recovery Needs.

===== Public Assistance Branch =====
This branch is responsible for managing the state's portion of the Public Assistance program, which provides assistance to local governments, state agencies, and private non-profits in the aftermath of a federally-declared disaster.

===== Hazard Mitigation Branch =====
This branch administers the Hazard Mitigation Grant Program (HMGP), Pre-Disaster Mitigation (PDM) grant, and Flood Mitigation Assistance (FMA) grant.

===== Unmet Recovery Needs Branch =====
This branch manages any state relief programs not covered under the federal Stafford Act.

==== ADMINISTRATION AND MISSION SUPPORT DIVISION ====
This division has two main focal points: Administration and Operations.

===== Administration Branch =====
This branch includes sections for Human Resources, finances, and facilities. The Finance Section is responsible for monitoring grant programs, overseeing contracts and purchasing, and coordinating state and federal audits. The Facilities Section provides maintenance and upkeep of the Agency's facilities.

===== Operations Branch =====
This branch supports the Agency's operations through two sections. The Communications Section is responsible for maintaining a statewide wireless radio system to ensure an interoperable communications network during an emergency. The Logistics Section manages and tracks the Agency's equipment, including acquiring and maintaining it.
