= Battle of Barrio Yating =

Historic event

Battle of Yating
- Part of the Philippine Revolution
Date	3 December 1898
Location	Pilar, Capiz
Result	Filipino victory

Belligerents
First Philippine Republic	(Spain) Spanish Empire

Commanders and leaders
Roque Lopez; Martin Delgado; Perfecto Poblador; Teresa Magbanua	(Spain) Diego de los Rios (Spain) Juan Lopez y Herrero

Strength
Unknown	~Cazadores and infanteria from Provincia de Capiz

Casualties and losses
Unknown	Unknown

The Battle of Yating (Filipino: Labanan sa Yating, Hiligaynon: Inaway sa Yating, Spanish: Batalla de Yating) occurred on 3 December 1898 in Mount Yating, Pilar, Capiz province, between the colonial forces of the Spanish Empire and that of Ejercito Libertador of Provisional Revolutionary Government of Visayas under the Visayan Teresa "Nay Isa" Magbanua. The Ejercito Libertador were victorious in this battle. Teresa Magbanua and her troops would later be victorious in the battle of Sapong Hills in Sara, District of Concepcion (now part of Iloilo Province).

== See also ==
- Battle of Tres de Abril
- Battle of Sapong Hills
