= Oak Top =

- U.S. National Register of Historic Places
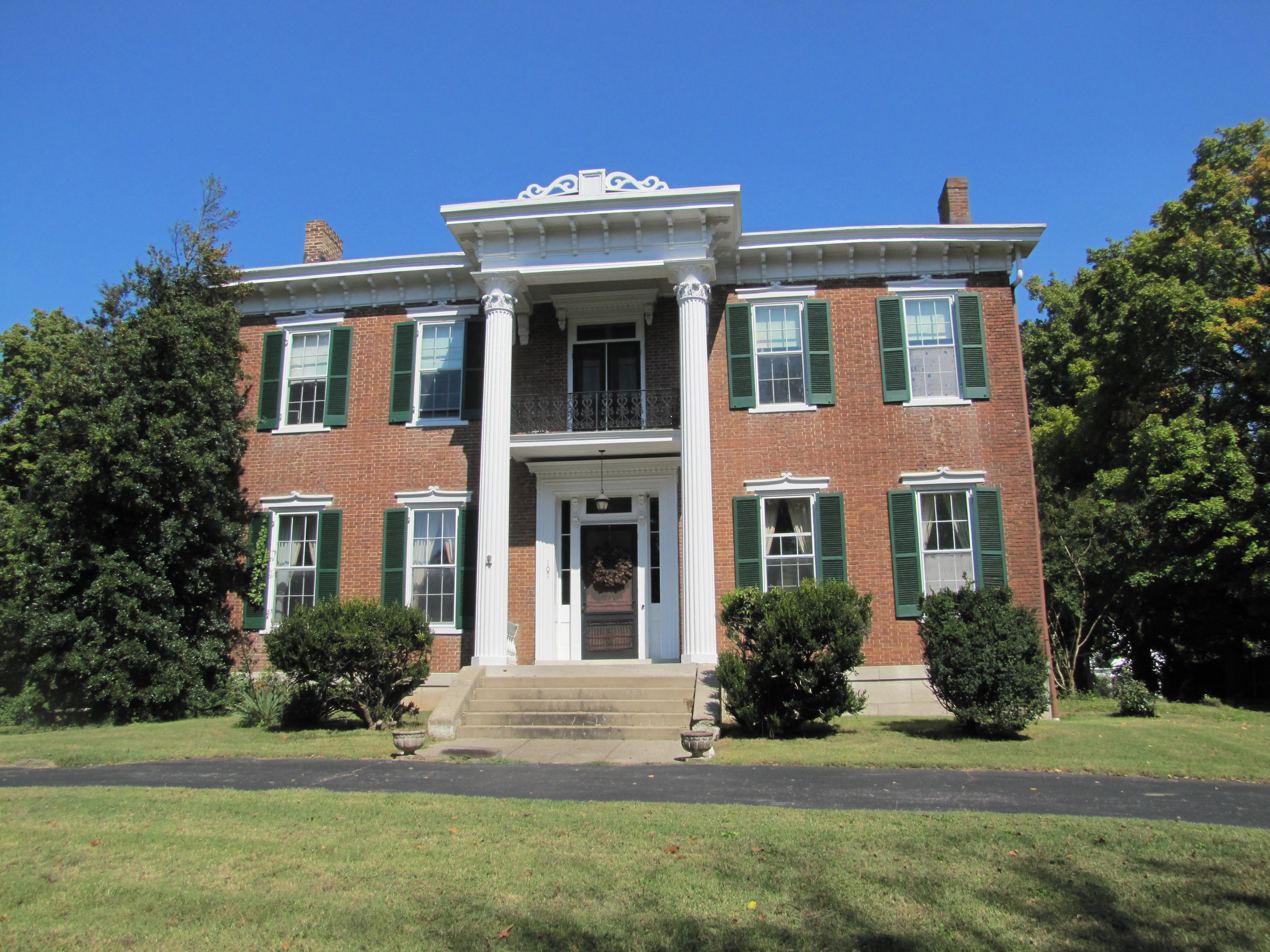

- Location within Tennessee Location within the United States
- Location: 107 Madison Terrace, Clarksville, Tennessee
- Coordinates: 36°31′21″N 87°20′15″W
- Area: 1 acre (0.40 ha)
- Built: 1850s
- Architectural style: Greek Revival
- NRHP reference No.: 80003850
- Added to NRHP: July 8, 1980

Oak Top, also known as The Smith Place, is a historic mansion in Clarksville, Tennessee, U.S.. It was built in the 1850s for Thomas W. Wisdom, a county judge. From 1869 to 1890, it was owned by Sterling Beaumont, a tobacco industrialist and banker.

The house was designed in the Greek Revival architectural style. It has been listed on the National Register of Historic Places since July 8, 1980.

== Notable owners ==
- Francis Gracey Childers (1890–1921)
