= Tennessee Wing Civil Air Patrol =

- Tennessee Wing of Civil Air Patrol

Associated branches
- United States Air Force

Command staff
- Commander: Col Tracy D Scantland

Current statistics
- Cadets: 608
- Seniors: 698
- Total Membership: 1,306
- Website: tnwg.cap.gov
- Statistics as of 28 June 2026

The Tennessee Wing Civil Air Patrol (CAP) is the highest echelon of Civil Air Patrol in the state of Tennessee. The Wing headquarters are located near Signature Flight Services (FBO) on McGhee Tyson airport in Alcoa, Tennessee. The Tennessee Wing consists of over 1,000 cadet and adult members at over 30 locations across the state.

== Mission ==
The Tennessee Wing performs all three missions of the Civil Air Patrol: providing emergency services; offering cadet programs for youth; and providing aerospace education for both CAP members and the general public.

=== Emergency services ===
Always prepared, both in the air and on the ground, members of Civil Air Patrol perform emergency services for state and local agencies as well as the federal government as the civilian auxiliary of the U.S. Air Force and for states/local communities as a nonprofit organization.

In 2022, Tennessee wing provided support to FEMA and other agencies following the spring tornadoes in eastern Kentucky and later, in August, after the severe flooding in western Kentucky.

=== Cadet programs ===
Civil Air Patrol’s cadet program transforms youth into dynamic Americans and aerospace leaders through a curriculum that focuses on leadership, aerospace, fitness, and character. As cadets participate in these four elements, they advance through a series of achievements, earning honors and increased responsibilities along the way. Many of the nation’s astronauts, pilots, engineers, and scientists first explored their careers through CAP. It shapes the experiences and aspirations of youth age 12-21, both in and outside CAP’s cadet program. Squadrons with cadets can be found across Tennessee, as shown in the list below.

=== Aerospace education ===
Civil Air Patrol’s awarding-winning aerospace education program promotes aerospace, aviation, and STEM-related careers with engaging, standards-based, hands-on curriculum and activities. It provides training to the members of CAP, and also offers workshops for youth and educators across the nation through schools and at public aviation events. Tennessee CAP holds annual professional development classes for teachers working with grades K-12, and also provides both published materials and STEM kits to homeschool groups.

== Organization ==
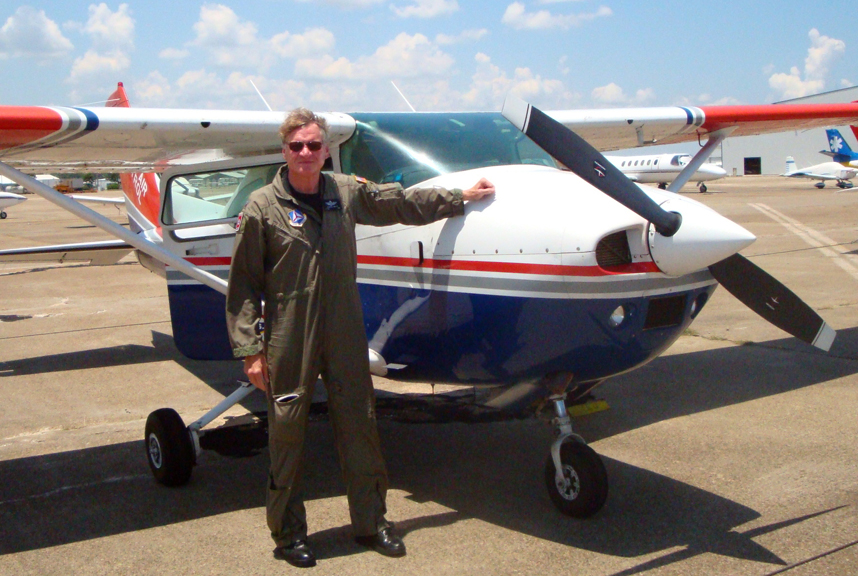
Charlie Smith, an ATA senior engineer and mission pilot for the Civil Air Patrol's Tennessee Wing, poses alongside the Cessna 182 that he flew in support of the Deep Water Horizon Mission from Mobile Alabama.

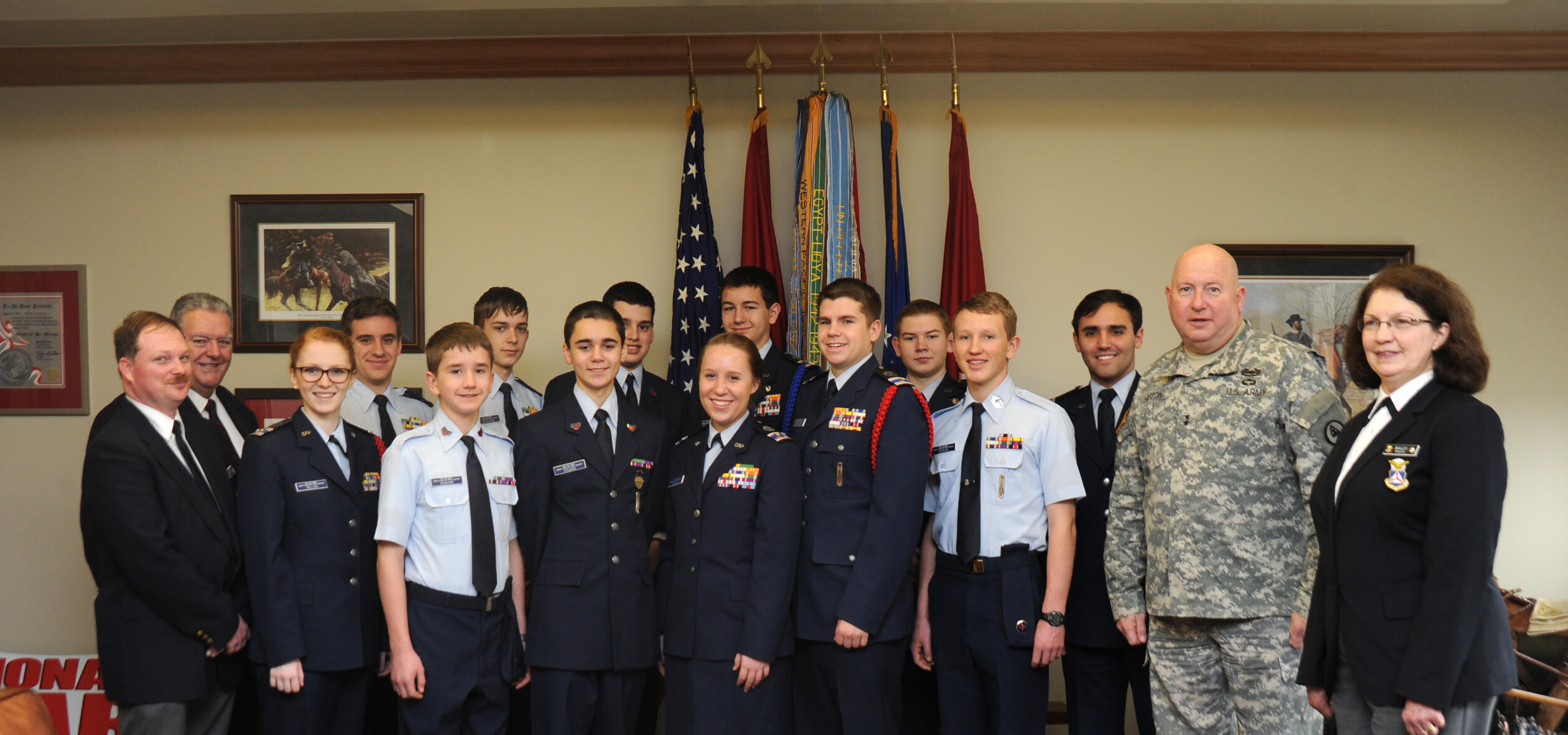
Cadets and senior members with the Tennessee Wing Civil Air Patrol got a chance to sit down and talk with Maj. Gen. Haston, Adjutant General of the Tennessee Military Department.

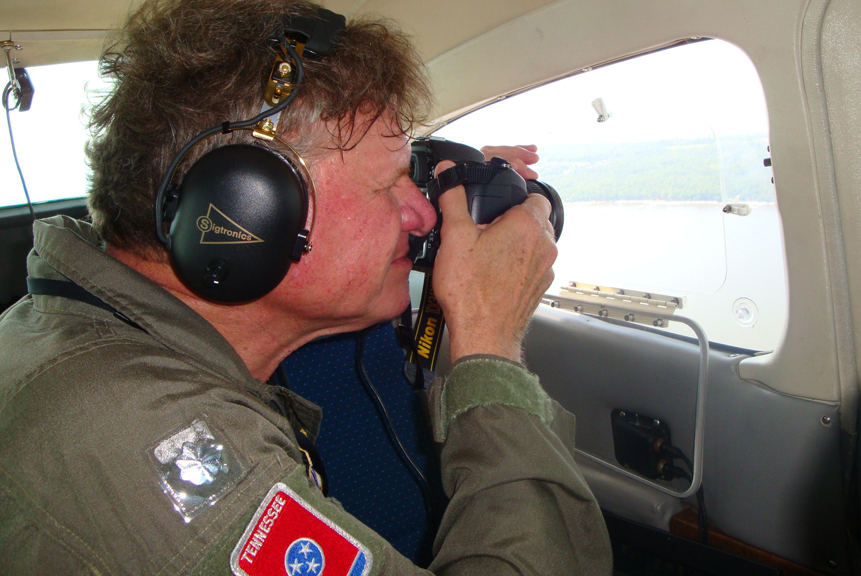
Charlie Smith, an ATA senior engineer and mission pilot for the Civil Air Patrol, lines up a photo out of the rear-seat swing window during an oil spill surveillance mission.

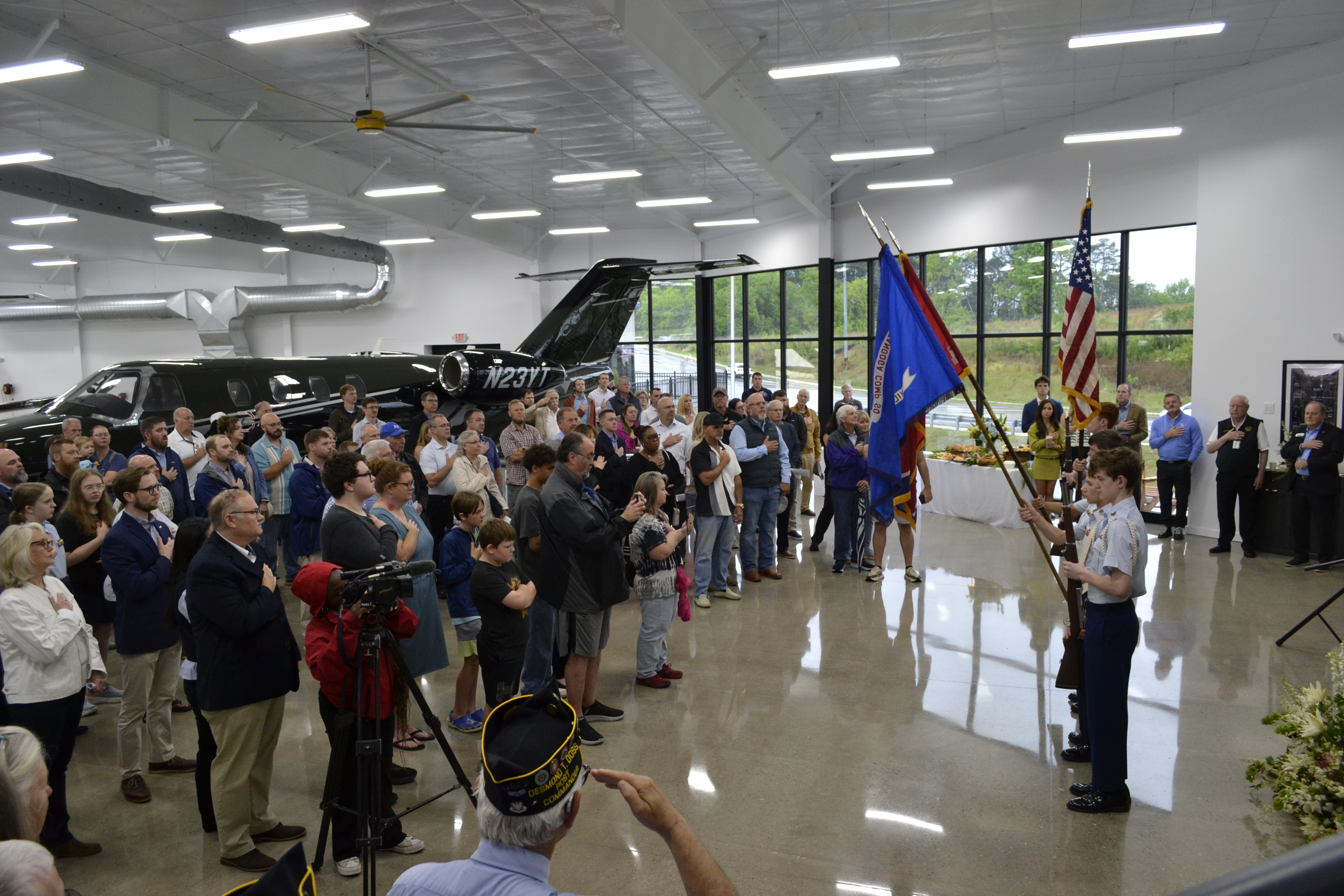
Cadets of TN-187 present the colors at the opening ceremony for the Skyboss hangar in Collegedale, TN, on 18 May 2026.

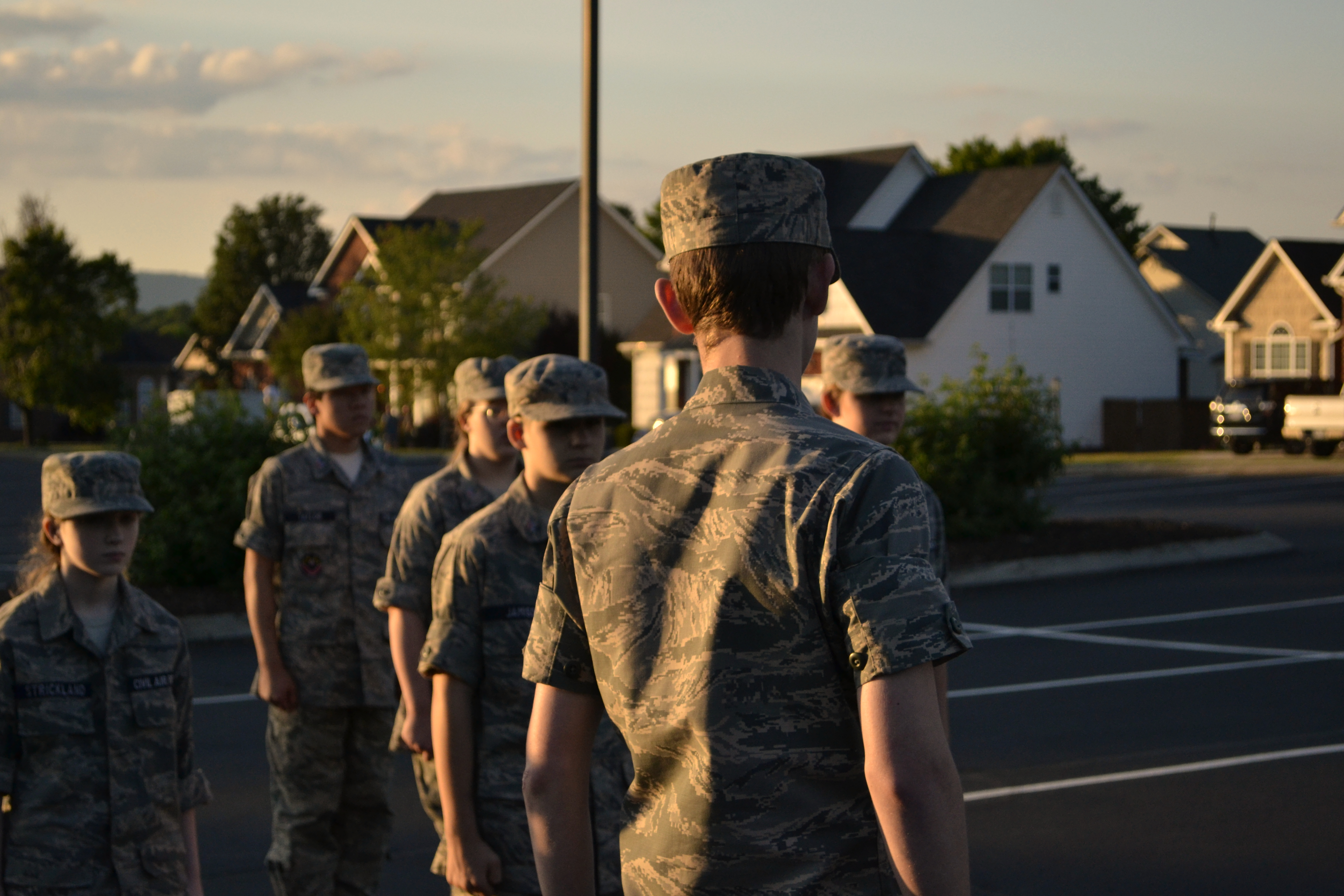
A Chattanooga Cadet Squadron (SER-TN-187) performs drill instruction during a meeting on 12 May 2026. Note the ABU uniform, which is still worn by many current cadets, despite currently being phased out in favor of the OCP uniform.

Squadrons of the Tennessee Wing
Designation	Squadron Name	Location	Notes
TN001	Tennessee Wing Headquarters	Alcoa	
TN004	Tri-Cites Composite Squadron	Blountville	
TN005	Smyrna Composite Squadron	Smyrna	
TN014	Memphis Belle Composite Squadron	Millington	
TN015	Greeneville Composite Squadron	Greeneville	
TN019	Morristown Composite Squadron	Morristown	
TN036	Tullahoma Composite Squadron	Tullahoma	
TN080	Henry County Composite Squadron	Paris	2001 Squadron of Merit, 2003 Squadron of Merit, 2004 Squadron of Merit
TN087	Knoxville Senior Squadron	Knoxville	
TN093	Sevier County Composite Squadron	Sevierville	
TN114	Southern Middle Tennessee Flight	Lewisburg	
TN119	Jackson Madison County Senior Squadron	Jackson	
TN120	Crossville Senior Squadron	Crossville	
TN133	Middle Tennessee Senior Squadron	Ashland City	
TN148	McGhee-Tyson Composite Squadron	Knoxville	
TN160	Sumner County Cadet Squadron	Madison	
TN162	Murfreesboro Composite Squadron	Murfreesboro	
TN170	Oak Ridge Composite Squadron	Oak Ridge	
TN173	Cleveland Composite Squadron	Cleveland	
TN176	Rhea County Flight	Dayton	
TN185	Music City Composite Squadron	Nashville	Squadron of Merit 2003, 2008, 2020, 2022 Squadron of Distinction 2020 Quality Cadet Unit Award 2014, 2016 - 2022 Unit Citation May 2019 and June 2021
TN187	Chattanooga Cadet Squadron	Chattanooga	The only squadron in the nation to issue the "Drill Cord" for outstanding drill performance.
TN191	Hendersonville Cadet Squadron	Hendersonville	
TN192	Choo Choo Senior Squadron	Chattanooga	
TN193	Williamson County Cadet Squadron	Thompson Station	
TN194	Hardeman County Cadet Squadron	Rossville	
TN195	Union City Composite Squadron	Union City	
TN218	Dickson County Composite Squadron	Dickson	
TN300	Frog Jump Composite Squadron	Frog Jump	
TN330	Sequoyah Cadet Squadron	Madisonville	
TN333	Maury County Composite Squadron	Mt Pleasant	
TN393	Cumberland Composite Squadron	Gainesboro	
TN395	Portland Flight	Portland	
TN582	Sunsphere Cadet Squadron	Knoxville	
TN583	Big Fork Cadet Squadron	Big Fork	
TN999	Tennessee Legislative Squadron	Nashville	

== Legal protection ==
Civil Air Patrol members employed within the borders of Tennessee are guaranteed unpaid leave from their place of work without "loss of time, pay not specifically related to leave of absence time, regular leave or vacation, or impairment of efficiency rating" whenever they are activated for duty or training, under TN Code § 8-33-110 and § 42-7-102 (2021).

== See also ==
- Awards and decorations of the Civil Air Patrol
- Tennessee Air National Guard
- Tennessee State Guard
