= Custody battle for Anna Mae He =

2001–07 United States child custody case

Anna Mae He (simplified Chinese: 贺梅; traditional Chinese: 賀梅; pinyin: Hè Méi or He Sijia) was born on January 28, 1999, in the United States and was the subject of a custody battle between her Chinese biological parents, Jack and Casey He, and her white foster parents, Jerry and Louise Baker. The case, revolving around the Bakers' claim that the Hes had abandoned their rights to the child when they signed a temporary custody order, lasted seven years and received national media attention in the United States.

== Background ==
Anna Mae He's father, Jack (simplified Chinese: 贺绍强; traditional Chinese: 賀紹強; pinyin: Hè Shàoqiáng), came to the United States in 1995 on a student visa to attend Arizona State University. In 1997 he enrolled in the University of Memphis, receiving a scholarship and a stipend to work as a graduate assistant. Anna Mae's mother, Casey (simplified Chinese: 罗秦; traditional Chinese: 羅秦; pinyin: Luó Qín), obtained a visa as Jack's wife and shortly after coming to the United States became pregnant with Anna Mae.

The university terminated Jack from his position due to an allegation of sexual assault by a student, though an investigation by the university determined the allegation to be false, resulting in the loss of his stipend and health insurance. Jack was charged with attempted rape but was acquitted by a jury in February, 2002. The couple was later involved in an altercation with the alleged rape victim and the alleged victim's husband in a grocery store. Casey was knocked down and suffered vaginal bleeding, leading to a $12,000 hospital bill. The couple had difficulties with repaying the charge with no stable income and sought help from Mid-South Christian Services. Mid-South agreed to place the baby in a foster home with Jerry and Louise Baker for three months. They additionally looked for someone to take Anna Mae back to China to be cared for by relatives, but were unable to find anyone.

== Disagreement ==
The Hes decided to let Anna Mae remain in the Bakers' custody due to their lack of financial ability to care for her. The Bakers expressed interest in adopting Anna Mae but received pushback from the Hes. An agreement was reached that would give the Bakers temporary custody and let the Hes retain parental rights. The Bakers claim there was also an oral agreement that the Bakers would raise Anna Mae until she was eighteen years old. But the Hes contend that they did not agree to this and that the arrangement was only temporary. A juvenile court officer's testimony supports the Hes' claim.

On June 2, 1999, Jack He and the Bakers met with a Mid-South Christian Services attorney, who told Jack it would be necessary to go to court to regain custody if all parties did not agree to a change in custody.

On June 4, 1999, the Hes and the Bakers went to the Shelby County Juvenile Court to obtain the consent order transferring custody to the Bakers. Without the knowledge of either party, the juvenile court officer typed a guardianship provision into the consent order. Since Casey He did not speak or read English very well, she was unable to read the documents and had to rely on an interpreter for their meaning. The juvenile court officer, along with three witnesses and the interpreter, testified that she was "adamant that at some point she wanted her child back". She was told that signing the consent order was necessary for Anna Mae to obtain health insurance and the interpreter testified that she signed the order believing custody to be temporary.

The Hes continued to visit Anna Mae regularly, though soon they began to have disagreements about the number of visitations with the Bakers, where the Bakers wrote that they "would like to get visits every other week", but that Casey would like to increase the number of visitations. In November 1999, Jack He told Jerry Baker they wanted to regain custody of Anna Mae, but the Bakers declined this request. The Hes contacted the juvenile court officer several times during these months complaining about problems with visitation and their intention to regain custody.

In May 2000, the Hes petitioned the Juvenile Court for custody. The petition was denied.

Jack found work in Georgia and Casey continued to visit Anna Mae until one day she refused to leave the Bakers' home. The police were called. Jack quit his job in Georgia after the Bakers told him that Casey was not allowed to visit Anna Mae by herself.

The Hes continued to visit Anna Mae until January 28, 2001, when an argument occurred at the Bakers' home. The Hes wanted to take Anna Mae to a photography studio for a family portrait on her second birthday, but the Bakers refused. The Bakers subsequently called the police. The Hes were told that they could not return to the Bakers' home, which was interpreted with contradiction. The police officer later testified that he said they could not return to the Bakers' house that day. The Hes believed they were being told that they never return to the Bakers' home. The Hes did not see Anna Mae again for years.

== Case history ==
The Hes filed to regain custody in April 2001, but since only Casey signed, the petition was refiled on May 29. A hearing was set for June 6 but was rescheduled to June 22 so that the Bakers' lawyer could attend. Meanwhile, the Bakers were advised by their attorney to file to revoke the Hes' parental rights. On June 20, 2001, they filed a petition for adoption and termination of parental rights in the Chancery Court of Shelby County, citing abandonment and lack of financial support from the Hes.

In May 2004, after a 10-day trial, Judge Robert L. Childers, a Tennessee circuit judge, terminated the Hes' parental rights on grounds of willful abandonment, despite the Hes persistent effort to regain custody via Juvenile Court. This decision was later affirmed by a majority in the Tennessee Court of Appeals on November 23, 2005. The Hes subsequently appealed to the Tennessee Supreme Court.

The final state verdict to revert Anna Mae He to her biological parents

In October 2006, the Hes argued at the Tennessee Supreme Court that the trial court was biased in terminating their parental rights. They contended that the facts did not support a finding of willful abandonment, as their repeated effort to seek custody via juvenile court was a clear attempt to visit Anna Mae. The Hes submitted a motion pro se to the Tennessee Supreme Court, asking the high court to rule on the custody issue directly. On how to interpret the word "temporary", in their pro se motion to the Tennessee Supreme Court, the Hes maintained that the temporary nature of the custody arrangement hinged on the temporary nature of the situation they experienced at the time of the arrangement. The Hes argued that they had parental rights over the custody dispute, as the exception laid out in a Tennessee Supreme Court decision based on Blair v. Badenhope should apply.

In January 2007, the Tennessee Supreme Court, in a unanimous decision authored by Chief Justice William M. Barker, reversed the ruling by the state Court of Appeals and ordered that Anna Mae He be returned to her biological parents. In its ruling, the Court said: "We hold that the parents of Anna Mae He did not voluntarily transfer custody and guardianship of Anna Mae He to the Bakers with knowledge of the consequences and, therefore, are entitled to superior rights to custody" and "the evidence does not support a 'willful failure to visit' as a ground for abandonment." The Bakers were ordered to pay all legal fees associated with the case.

The Bakers motioned for a rehearing of the case and the retainment of custody on February 2, 2007, to the Tennessee Supreme Court, which was declined on February 9, 2007. The Bakers then petitioned the U.S. Supreme Court for the same request. The Supreme Court declined the Bakers' request.

The U.S. Supreme Court denied Bakers' petition for a writ of certiorari in mid-2007.

== Transfer of custody ==
After the final decision of the Tennessee Supreme Court, Anna Mae He was returned to her biological parents. The Bakers were not granted any residual rights over Anna Mae. The Bakers petitioned for appeal at the U.S. Supreme Court. The Court denied the Bakers' petition and their applications to stop the custody transfer. The Bakers then filed a lawsuit in Federal district court against the juvenile court and the attorney general of Tennessee; the court dismissed that suit for lack of subject matter jurisdiction.

On February 21, 2007, the Bakers released videos of Anna Mae, showing what they explained as Anna Mae He's rejection of her Chinese heritage, saying she would rather live in the United States over China, would not eat Chinese food anymore, and told people that she was Mexican. According to a report from USA Today dated February 21, 2007, Jerry Baker paid Anna Mae US$5 for each question she answered, such as "Where do you want to grow up United States or China?" and "What do you want your last name to be, Baker or He?" The USA Today article noted that she refused to answer the question about her last name. Juvenile Court Judge Curtis Person threatened to issue a gag order to the Bakers if the media coverage continued.

On March 15, 2007, in a two-hour visit at an undisclosed location that included a court-appointed psychologist, Anna Mae visited the Hes for the first time. Judge Curtis Person said that the psychologist will be responsible for arranging a series of meetings over a period of four weeks, with the visits increasing in duration and frequency. A second meeting took place on March 18, 2007, also at an undisclosed location. A court-appointed guardian went to Jerry and Louise Bakers' Memphis home on July 20, 2007, to pick up Anna Mae He, and she was officially placed with her biological parents on July 23, 2007.

Child advocacy specialist, Debbie Grabarkiewicz, working with A Child's Best Interest, a national child advocacy organization, argued for Anna Mae to stay with the Bakers and for Anna Mae to remain in the U.S., stating that "Anna Mae was 'inconsolable' when she was moved and felt she had lost all control over her life". The Hes said she was initially hostile to them and was angry and withdrawn, refused to eat or sleep in her own bed, and was afraid that the Hes were going to poison her. She was afraid of going to China, which she thought was remote and strange. The Hes said she began to warm up to them after her mother said they never agreed to give her up. Later her parents agreed to let her play with the Bakers' daughter, Aimee, whom she was close friends with. She then began calling the Hes Baba ("Daddy" in Chinese) and Mama ("Mom in Chinese). The Hes invited the Bakers to attend Anna's ninth birthday party on January 28, 2008, on the condition that the Bakers not cry and that they not refer to themselves as Anna's parents. They accepted the invitation

The He family's legal residence in the U.S. was based on Jack He's student visa, which has long since expired. They were allowed to stay in the U.S. during the custody battle. The He family agreed to go back to China to avoid deportation after the custody battle, although Anna Mae had lived in the U.S. her entire life and could not speak Chinese. The Hes arrived in China on February 11, 2008. The Hes told Anna that they were going on vacation. When the family was interviewed by an ABC News crew at an airport in China and was asked how long they would be staying there, Anna said they would stay for two days and said Jack's new job in Hunan was in Tennessee.

== Life in China ==
The Hes hoped to enroll Anna in an international school that teaches in English. Jack He became an associate professor at the Hunan Vocational College of Science and Technology and was appointed director of the college's international exchange program. In 2008, he resigned for undisclosed personal reasons.

On July 31, 2008, local Memphis television station WMC-TV published an article stating that Jack He wanted to move back to the U.S. with his family, and that his children were not happy in China. He disagreed with the statements in an interview with the Chinese newspaper Y Weekend, and suggested that the article "made things up". In an issued statement, the reporter claimed that Jack He had asked for help returning to the United States "several times".

In the interview, Jack further elaborated on Anna's upbringing with the Bakers. He said that while he felt the Bakers "subjectively love" Anna, the "actual effect" of her being with the Bakers "[has] not been good". He alleged that the Bakers told Anna that the Hes were "illegal aliens who crossed...from...Mexican border and who [had] disappeared since," and that they told a USA Today reporter that Anna was "abandoned by her natural parents" whereas they "saved this abandoned child or else she would be sent back to the horrible place known as China".

In October 2008, local Memphis television Fox 13 reported on the separation of Jack and Casey He, with Casey having sole custody of the children, including Anna Mae. Casey stated that all three of the children are in private schools where both Chinese and English are spoken. Casey does not know where Jack is and does not have his contact information.

On November 29, 2008, an Associated Press story indicated that Anna Mae and her siblings attend a boarding school in Chongqing, China, during the week and visit their mother on weekends, when they also receive extra lessons in Chinese, art, and piano. Their maternal uncle pays the tuition for the children's boarding school and also owns the two-bedroom apartment where the children live with their mother. Casey He told the reporter that sending the children to boarding school was a difficult decision, but her brother persuaded her it would be too difficult to manage the children's schoolwork and daily schedule if she did not. She visits them at the school three times a week in addition to seeing them on weekends. Anna Mae, who is a year behind in school because of her limited Chinese, told the reporter she doesn't like living at her boarding school and doesn't talk to her teachers or classmates because they can't understand her. The report stated that she couldn't think of anything she liked about China, but said the best thing about school is going home to her mother. Anna Mae told the reporter she doesn't miss her father. Jack He told the reporter he hopes to reconcile with his wife, but he has filed for divorce and custody of all three of the children. As of November 2008, he had not seen Anna Mae or her siblings since July. Anna Mae speaks with her former foster parents, the Bakers, on the telephone once a week and they also send her packages filled with some of her favorite foods. Casey He spoke to the reporter about returning to the United States with the children but said it would be difficult for her to find work there because of her limited English. She hopes that she might be able to eventually afford to send the children to an international day school in Chongqing.

In February 2010, Anna told an American ABC News reporter that she missed her classmates in Tennessee. She said she now considers herself both American and Chinese. In China, she said she tells everyone that her mother is Casey He and does not mention Louise Baker because it is too complicated to explain her relationship to the Bakers, whom she still talks to regularly via telephone and over the Internet. Anna said "I would say it's fair and it's not fair" when the reporter asked if it was fair she had to move to China.

In the summer of 2011, Anna and her two siblings went to the U.S. for summer vacation without their parents. They stayed at the Bakers' house. On August 15, 2011, Anna and her siblings returned to China.

== Back to the US ==
In 2014, Anna's mother contacted the Bakers, who agreed to host Anna and her siblings to go to schools in the US. Later Anna's brother went back to China, while Anna and her sister stayed in the US. From 2018 to 2022, Anna studied Political Science and Government in St. Lawrence University in New York. In 2022, Anna graduated with a bachelor's degree, with the name Anna Mae-He Baker on her certificate.

== See also ==
- Haigui
- Interracial adoption
