= Battle of Sapong Hills =

- Part of the Philippine Revolution
Date	December, 1898
Location	Sara, Iloilo
Result	Filipino victory

Belligerents
First Philippine Republic	(Spain) Spanish Empire

Commanders and leaders
Teresa Magbanua	(Spain) Primo de Rivera

Strength
1,000 men	400–450 infantry

Casualties and losses
43 killed	106 killed, hundreds more wounded

The Battle of Sapong Hills (Filipino: Labanan sa mga burol ng Sapong, Hiligaynon: Gubat sang Pukadtod sang Sapong, Spanish: Batalla de las colinas de Sapong) was fought in Sara, Iloilo province, between the forces of Spanish colonial government and Visayan revolutionaries led by the "female General" Teresa Magbanua. The Filipino revolutionaries decisively won the battle, and in this battle where Teresa herself was considered the "Visayan Joan of Arc".

== See also ==
- Battle of Tres de Abril
- Battle of Barrio Yoting
