= Teresa Magbanua =

Filipina educator and revolutionary

- Born: Teresa Magbanua y Ferraris; October 13, 1868; Pototan, Iloilo, Captaincy General of the Philippines, Spanish Empire
- Died: August 1947 (aged 78); Pagadian, Zamboanga, Philippines
- Relatives: Juan Magbanua (father); Alejandra Ferraris (mother); Alejandro Balderas (husband); Perfecto Poblador (uncle); Pascual Magbanua (brother); Elias Magbanua (brother)
- Military career
- Allegiance: First Philippine Republic; Katipunan: Visayan Region
- Branch: Philippine Revolutionary Army
- Service years: 1896–1900
- Rank: Brigadier General (disputed)
- Nicknames: Nanay Isa; Nay Isa; Visayan "Joan of Arc"
- Commands: Bolo Battalion
- Conflicts: Philippine Revolution: Battle of Barrio Yoting; Battle of Sapong Hills; Philippine–American War: Battle of Iloilo City; Battle of Balantang; World War II: Philippine Resistance (1941–45)

Teresa Magbanua y Ferraris (October 13, 1868 – August 1947), better known as Teresa Magbanua and dubbed as the "Visayan Joan of Arc", was a Filipino schoolteacher and military leader. Born in Pototan, Iloilo, Philippines, she retired from education and became a housewife shortly after her marriage to Alejandro Balderas, a wealthy landowner from Sara, Iloilo. When the 1896 Philippine Revolution against Spain broke out, she became one of only a few women to join the Panay-based Visayan arm of the Katipunan, the initially secret revolutionary society headed by Andrés Bonifacio.

Despite opposition from her husband, Magbanua followed her two younger brothers and took up arms against the Spaniards, leading troops into combat and winning several battles under the command of General Martin Delgado. Magbanua is credited as the only woman to lead troops in the Visayan area during the Revolution. Shortly thereafter, Magbanua shifted to fighting American colonial forces during the Philippine–American War.

She is one of the few Filipinos to have participated in all three resistance movements against the three major colonizers: Spain (in the Philippine Revolution), the United States (in the Philippine–American War), and Japan (in World War II).

== Early life and career ==
Magbanua's date of birth is variously reported as 13 October 1863, 13 October, 1868, or 4 November 1871. She was born in Pototan, Iloilo, Philippines, to affluent parents. Don Juan Magbanua, a judge, sat on the Court of First Instance in Iloilo City, while Doña Alejandra Ferraris was the daughter of Captain Benito Ferraris. Teresa was the Magbanua's second child, joining her sisters María and Paz, and younger brothers Manuel, Pascual and Elias. Magbanua was recorded to have been a precocious child, remembered by one of her sisters as a "dynamic personality, restless, and unafraid of any man."

Magbanua studied teaching in college, first at the Colegio de San José in Jaro, Iloilo, and later in Manila, where she studied at three different girls' schools: Colegio de Santa Rosa (1894), Santa Catalina College (1886), and Colegio de Doña Cecilia. She earned a teaching certificate at Colegio de Doña Cecilia in 1894 and a master's degree soon after from the University of Santo Tomás. She then returned home to Pototan and began teaching, where her students knew her as a disciplinarian. After four years of teaching in Pototan, Magbanua moved north to Sara, Iloilo, and became a schoolteacher there, meeting Alejandro Balderas whom she married in 1898. Balderas was a wealthy landowner, and after she married, Magbanua quit her teaching job and became a housewife. While working on her husband's lands, Magbanua learned how to shoot a pistol and ride a horse. Her horseback skills improved to the point that she would ride on horseback from Sara to her hometown of Pototan, a 30 kilometres (19 mi) distance over rugged terrain.

== Philippine Revolution ==
War broke out between the Filipinos and Spanish in 1896, and Magbanua became a member of the Katipunan revolutionaries. While the Katipunan "largely excluded (women) from the revolutionary army", the movement also recognized the role women had played in the struggle against the Spanish, so much so that the Katipunan organized a women's chapter as early as 1893.

In October 1898, the war entered Iloilo province and two of her brothers joined the revolutionary army. While Magbanua wanted to help out the war effort, her husband was against it. Magbanua did not listen; however, and went to her uncle, Major General Perfecto Poblador, who commanded the Northern Zone at the time. Magbanua asked him to join the Army and who would later take charge of the Administrative Division. While hesitant at first, General Poblador eventually gave in to his niece and gave Magbanua command of a battalion of bolo troops.

Magbanua fought in several key battles during the revolution. On 3 December 1898, her forces fought and defeated Spanish troops at the Battle of Barrio Yating, which took place in Pilar, Capiz. She led her troops into this, her first battle, on horseback. Her efforts during the Battle of Barrio Yating earned Magbanua the nickname "Visayan Joan of Arc". She was also affectionately known among her troops as "Nanay Isa" or "'Nay Isa" (Nanay being the Visayan word of "mother", and "Isa", a shortening of her name.)

On 3 December 1898, Magbanua led her troops against Spanish forces at the Battle of Sapong Hills near Sara. Magbanua prevailed, despite the odds being heavily in favor of the Spanish. After these battles, Magbanua's forces were joined by revolutionary forces from Antique, under the command of General Leandro Fullon, for a march on Iloilo City.

On 24 December 1898, Magbanua participated in the liberation of Iloilo City, alongside Generals Martin Delgado, Roque Lopez, Quintin Salas and others. Along with the other generals, Magbanua helped encircle Iloilo City, allowing General Delgado to enter and retake the city from the Spanish.

== Philippine–American War ==
During the Philippine–American War, Magbanua participated in several battles against American forces, as did her brothers. Her brothers were both ranking officers—Pascual was a general while Elias was a major. On 11 February 1899, Magbanua fought in the Second Battle of Iloilo City. Along with General Martin Delgado, Magbanua defended Iloilo City against the advancing forces of Brigadier General Marcus Miller. This battle ended in defeat for Magbanua and Delgado, as American forces took Iloilo without a single reported casualty. On 10 March 1899, Magbanua participated in the Battle of Balantang, Jaro, along with her brother Pascual. This battle resulted in Philippine forces retaking Jaro from the Americans. For her valor, Magbanua was given a prominent place in the celebration that followed, and led her troops into the city while riding a white horse. Also in 1899, Magbanua participated in the defense of the Balantang-Tacas-Jiabo-an line.

The celebrations would not last long, and Magbanua soon suffered personal tragedy. General Pascual Magbanua died in December 1899 at the age of 24, under mysterious circumstances. Her other brother, Major Elias Magbanua, also died mysteriously at the age of 19, and both deaths dealt a blow to Magbanua. She began using guerrilla tactics after the Filipino forces' regional headquarters in Santa Barbara fell to the Americans. She surrendered her troops to the American forces in 1900 and returned to farming.

There is no official record that proves Magbanua was a commissioned officer; however, she is referred to by the honorific "general" in many texts.

== World War II ==
While not an active fighter during World War II, Magbanua did what she could to resist Japanese forces during the Japanese occupation of the Philippines. She sold her personal belongings to purchase food and supplies, which she would then give to the local guerrillas. Shortly after the outbreak of the war, her husband Alejandro Balderas died, and Magbanua sold her property in Iloilo to help finance the guerrillas.

== Later life and death ==
Magbanua moved to Pagadian in Zamboanga after the end of World War II and lived there with her sister Maria. She never remarried after Baldaras' death, and their marriage produced no children. Magbanua died on an unknown date in August 1947. Her burial was attended only by her close friends; there were no announcements made of her death at the time.

== Legacy ==
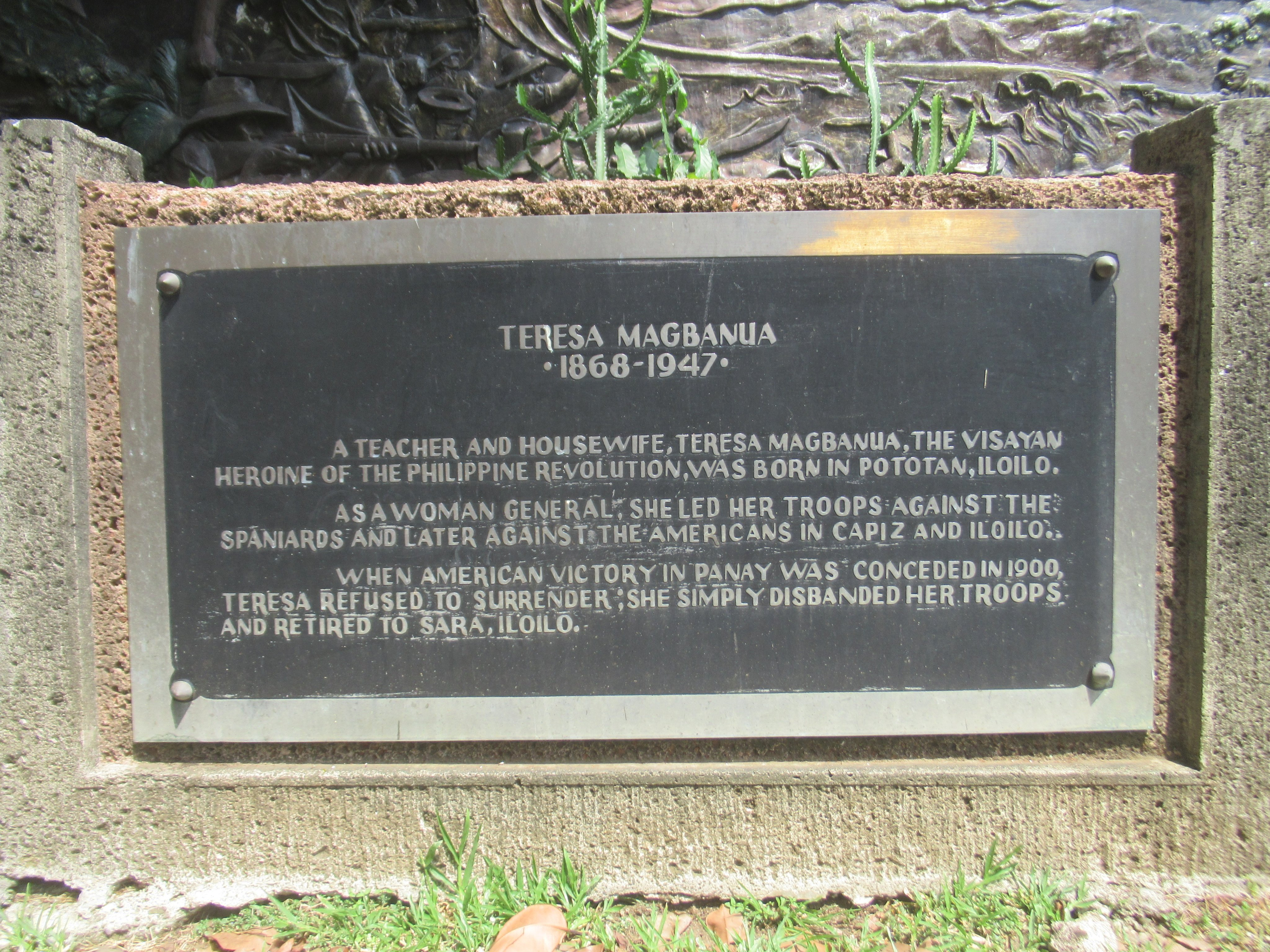
Magbanua's memorial marker at the Himlayang Pilipino Memorial Park (Quezon City).

While not as well known as her brothers, Magbanua was recognized for her courage and service. There are streets named after Magbanua in Pototan and Iloilo City. Several awards are also given out in her name, including the Gawad Teresa Magbanua Award given to teachers in Davao, and the Teresa Magbanua award for women's and children's rights given to Ilonggos in Iloilo. October 13 is officially Teresa Magbanua Day in Pototan; it was first observed in 2006. A Philippine Coast Guard vessel was named after her, the BRP Teresa Magbanua.

== Media Portrayal ==
- Portrayed by Chin Chin Gutierrez in the 1996 TV series, Bayani.

== See also ==
- List of Filipino generals in the Philippine Revolution and the Philippine–American War

== Sources ==
- Antoja, M. (1998). My Country and My People 4. Rex Bookstore, Inc. p. 233. ISBN 9789712322532.
- Cook, Bernard A. (2006). Women and War: A Historical Encyclopedia from Antiquity to the Present. ABC-CLIO. p. 465. ISBN 978-1-85109-770-8.
- Lanzona, Vina A. (April 22, 2009). Amazons of the Huk Rebellion: Gender, Sex, and Revolution in the Philippines. University of Wisconsin Press. p. 131. ISBN 9780299230937.
- NCC, National Centennial Commission (1999). Philippine revolution: the making of a nation : papers from the regional conferences held in Cebu City, Davao City, Baguio City, and Dapitan City. National Centennial Commission (Philippines). p. 190. ISBN 9789719201878.
- Serag, Sebastian Sta. Cruz (1997). The Remnants of the Great Ilonggo Nation. Rex Bookstore, Inc. p. 268. ISBN 9789712321429.
