= Childers Hill, Tennessee =

- Unincorporated community
- Location within Tennessee Location within the United States
- Coordinates: 35°04′42″N 88°19′30″W
- Country: United States
- State: Tennessee
- County: Hardin

Area
  - Total: 1.20 sq mi (3.12 km^{2})
  - Land: 1.20 sq mi (3.12 km^{2})
  - Water: 0 sq mi (0.00 km^{2})
- Elevation: 525 ft (160 m)

Population (2020)
  - Total: 100
  - Density: 82.9/sq mi (32.01/km^{2})
- Time zone: UTC-6 (Central (CST))
  - Summer (DST): UTC-5 (CDT)
- Area code: 731
- GNIS feature ID: 1280451

Childers Hill is a census-designated place (CDP) and unincorporated community in Hardin County, Tennessee. Childers Hill is located south of Savannah and west of the Tennessee River.

== History ==
Childers Hill is named for Francis Gracey Childers, a Tennessee politician and Army general.

== Geography ==
Childers Hill has a total area of 3.12 km2 (1.2 sq mi), all land.

== Demographics ==
Historical population
Census	Pop.	Note	%±
2020	100		—
U.S. Decennial Census

As of the 2020 census, Childers Hill had a population of 100. The racial makeup of the CDP in 100% White.
