= HMS Childers =

Five ships of the Royal Navy have borne the name HMS Childers:

- HMS Childers (1778) was a 14-gun brig-sloop launched in 1778 and broken up in 1811.
- HMS Childers (1812) was an 18-gun Cruizer-class brig-sloop launched in 1812 and broken up in 1822.
- HMS Childers (1827) was a 16-gun Cruizer-class brig-sloop launched in 1827 and sold in 1865.
- HMVS Childers was a torpedo boat launched in 1883, assigned to the colonial naval forces in Australia, and sold in 1918.
- HMS Childers (R91) was a C-class destroyer launched in 1945 and scrapped in 1963.

== See also ==
- HMAS Childers
