= Childers House =

Official residence in Tennessee, United States

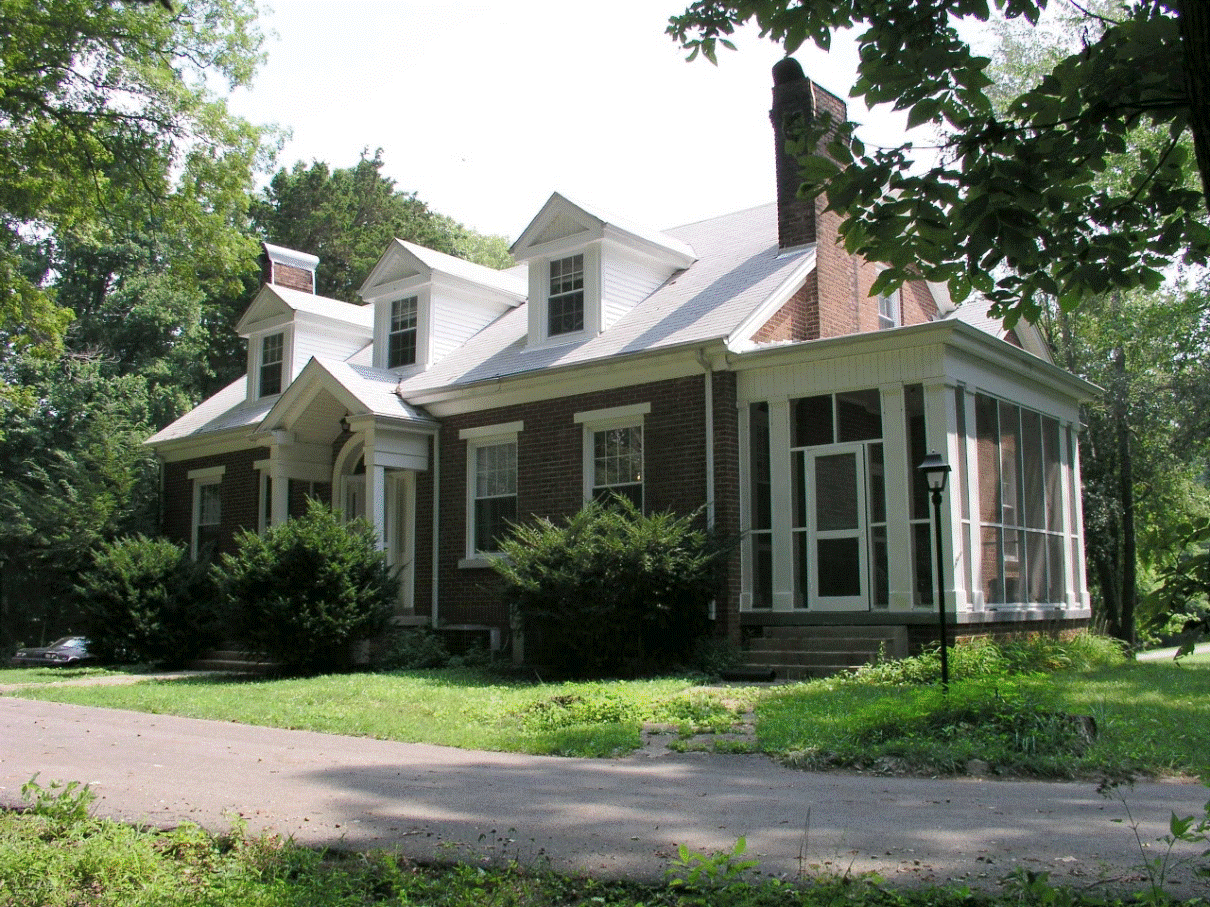
- Childers House in the 2010s

- Location within Tennessee

General information
- Type: Official residence
- Architectural style: Colonial Revival
- Location: Fort Campbell, Montgomery County, Tennessee, United States
- Coordinates: 36°35′0.0″N 87°31′20.2″W
- Current tenants: MG David W. Gardner
- Named for: James Glenn Childers
- Construction started: 1938
- Completed: 1939
- Owner: United States Department of the Army

Childers House is the official residence of the base commander of Fort Campbell, a major United States Army installation. The house is located on the grounds of Fort Campbell along the Kentucky–Tennessee border. It was originally built for the Childers family in the 1930s.

In 1997, the house was designated by the Tennessee Historical Commission as an eligible property for listing on the National Register of Historic Places (NRHP) under Criterion C.

== History ==
Between 1938 and 1939, the house was built for James Glenn Childers (1904–1968), a wealthy landowner and son of General Francis Gracey Childers. The family had lived in the area since the end of the American Civil War. During the construction, Childers imported Italian marble and bronze fixtures from Spain. The house was constructed in Montgomery County, Tennessee, and cost US$50,000 during the Great Depression. Childers lived in the home until 1941. The U.S. Army used eminent domain to purchase the property for the war effort during the construction of Camp Campbell.

During World War II, German POWs built a fence around the property; the U.S. government required Childers to pay the prisoners higher wages than African American workers.

From March 2014 to October 2017, the Childers House was vacated due to construction on nearby range safety areas.

== Architectural significance ==
The Childers House is built in the Colonial Revival architectural style. The home is a modern replica of Gunston Hall in Mason Neck, Virginia. The house is maintained by the United States Army Corps of Engineers.

In 1977, the building was deemed ineligible for the National Register of Historic Places; however, the Tennessee Historical Commission formally determined the Childers House was eligible for listing on the NRHP under Criterion C for its architectural significance.

== Notable tenants ==
- James Glenn Childers
- John F. Campbell
- Joseph P. McGee

== See also ==
- Quarters 1
- Tingey House
- Tennessee Residence
