= Tennessee State Guard =

- The Tennessee State Guard insignia
- Active: 1915 – 1917; 1941 – 1947; 1985 – present
- Country: United States
- Allegiance: Tennessee
- Type: State Military
- Role: Military reserve force
- Size: ~500
- Part of: Tennessee Military Department
- Garrison/HQ: Nashville, TN
- Nickname: TNSG
- Website: TNSG Official Website

Commanders
- Commander-in-Chief: Governor Bill Lee
- Adjutant General: Major General Warner A. Ross II
- Commanding General: Brigadier General Kevin Stewart
- Command Sergeant Major: Command Sergeant Major Heath Young

The Tennessee State Guard (TNSG) is the state defense force of the state of Tennessee. The TNSG is organized as a military reserve force whose members drill once per month unless called to active duty. The TNSG is a branch of the Tennessee Military Department, alongside the Tennessee Army National Guard, the Tennessee Air National Guard, and the Tennessee Emergency Management Agency. The State Guard acts as a force multiplier for the state's National Guard. As a state defense force, the Tennessee State Guard cannot be federalized, and is not deployed outside the borders of Tennessee, as it is a purely state-level unit. It answers solely to the Governor of Tennessee, unlike the dual federal and state controlled National Guard. The creation of a state military force is recognized under Tennessee Code Annotated 58-1-401.

== History ==
=== Origins ===
The Tennessee State Guard traces its origins to the American Revolution. During the Battle of King's Mountain, approximately four hundred volunteers from the area known today as Tennessee crossed the mountains into North Carolina to fight against the British Army and Loyalist militias. They contributed significantly to the Patriot victory.

Tennessee militias served in battle again in the War of 1812 under Andrew Jackson. After participating in the Battle of Horseshoe Bend, they served with distinction in the Battle of New Orleans, a major American victory in the conflict.

During the Mexican–American War, the nickname "The Volunteer State" became associated with Tennessee. When asked by President Polk to provide two infantry regiments and one cavalry regiment, Tennessee provided approximately ten times that number of volunteers.

On May 7, 1861, in the early months of the American Civil War, The State of Tennessee entered into a military league with the Confederate States of America. The Tennessee General Assembly authorized Governor Isham G. Harris to organize and equip a provisional force of volunteer state troops. The organization of the force took place on May 9, 1861. The General Assembly resolved June 29, 1861 that the Governor was authorized to place at the disposal of the Confederate States the volunteer forces of Tennessee, and to place the defense of the state in the hands of the President of the Confederacy. July 31, 1861 the Governor ordered the officers of the provisional army should muster their commands for the inspection of senior officers from the Confederacy. Rolls of companies and regiments were to be turned over to the Confederate inspectors, which would act as a formal transfer of the troops from the State of Tennessee to the Confederate States. The transfer was concluded on August 7, 1861. The Provisional Army of Tennessee formed the core of the Confederate Army of Tennessee.

=== Reconstruction Era ===
During the Reconstruction Era, violent activity by the white supremacist Ku Klux Klan (KKK) and former Confederate partisans led Governor William G. Brownlow to establish the Tennessee State Guard as a state militia to counter these anti-Reconstruction efforts. The Tennessee State Guard was a coalition drawn from white Unionists and Radical Republicans, as well as black freedmen; seven companies contained black soldiers, including one commanded entirely by black officers. During the Reconstruction Era, the Tennessee State Guard was used "to police elections, protect recently enfranchised freedmen, and thwart the operations of paramilitary groups such as the Ku Klux Klan."

=== World War I ===
In 1915, to replace the Tennessee National Guard after the National Guard was federalized, Tennessee created a paramilitary unit, the Tennessee Rangers, which was organized as a constabulary unit and fell under the authority of the adjutant general. In 1916, the Rangers were deployed to end the burning and destruction of properties in Stewart County by the Ku Klux Klan. The Rangers helped maintain order during World War I while the National Guard was deployed abroad until their disbandment in 1923.

=== World War II ===
In 1941, prior to the United States' entrance into World War II, the Tennessee State Guard was reinstated by Governor Prentice Cooper. The State Guard received training and direction from the federal military, with approximately 100 officers spending two weeks training under army officers at Fort Oglethorpe in Georgia. Within a year, Tennessee's State Guard became the fifth largest in the United States, the largest in the South and the largest state guard in proportion to its population. One famous Tennessean, Alvin York, belonged to the World War II-era Tennessee State Guard, accepting a commission as a colonel in 1941. The State Guard was activated numerous times, including guarding a Boeing B-17 Flying Fortress which was forced to make an emergency landing outside of Pulaski, Tennessee; maintaining peace after a riot in Bristol, Tennessee; performing relief effort following a train crash in Jellico, Tennessee; and assisting in the pursuit and capture of three escaped German prisoners from Camp Forrest. By 1947, with National Guard units returning home, the State Guard went inactive.

=== 1985-present ===
In 1985, the Tennessee Defense Force was reactivated to provide a trained military reserve force for the Governor to call upon in times of emergency, and, in 1998, the name was changed by the legislature to the Tennessee State Guard. In 1993, the TNSG was deployed to assist in recovery operations following a series of tornadoes which touched down in Tennessee. After the attacks of September 11, 2001, state guard members were called up to guard the Naval Support Activity Mid-South base in Millington, Tennessee. In 2004, during the Iraq War, members of the Tennessee State Guard were activated to assist the 278th Armored Cavalry Regiment with pre-mobilization processing. In 2005, Governor Phil Bredesen activated the Tennessee State Guard to assist with relief efforts from Hurricane Katrina.

In April 2020, members of the Tennessee State Guard were activated to State Active Duty in response to the COVID-19 pandemic. Members were tasked with providing medical support to Tennessee's COVID-19 Medical Joint Task Force. Soldiers of the Medical Expeditionary Group (MEG), composed of members of the 61st MEDCOM and other members of the TNSG, were honored in August 2021 by the Tennessee National Guard for their 17 months of State Active Duty service during the COVID pandemic. Over 110 TNSG soldiers participated in the response to support the people of Tennessee.

== Duties ==
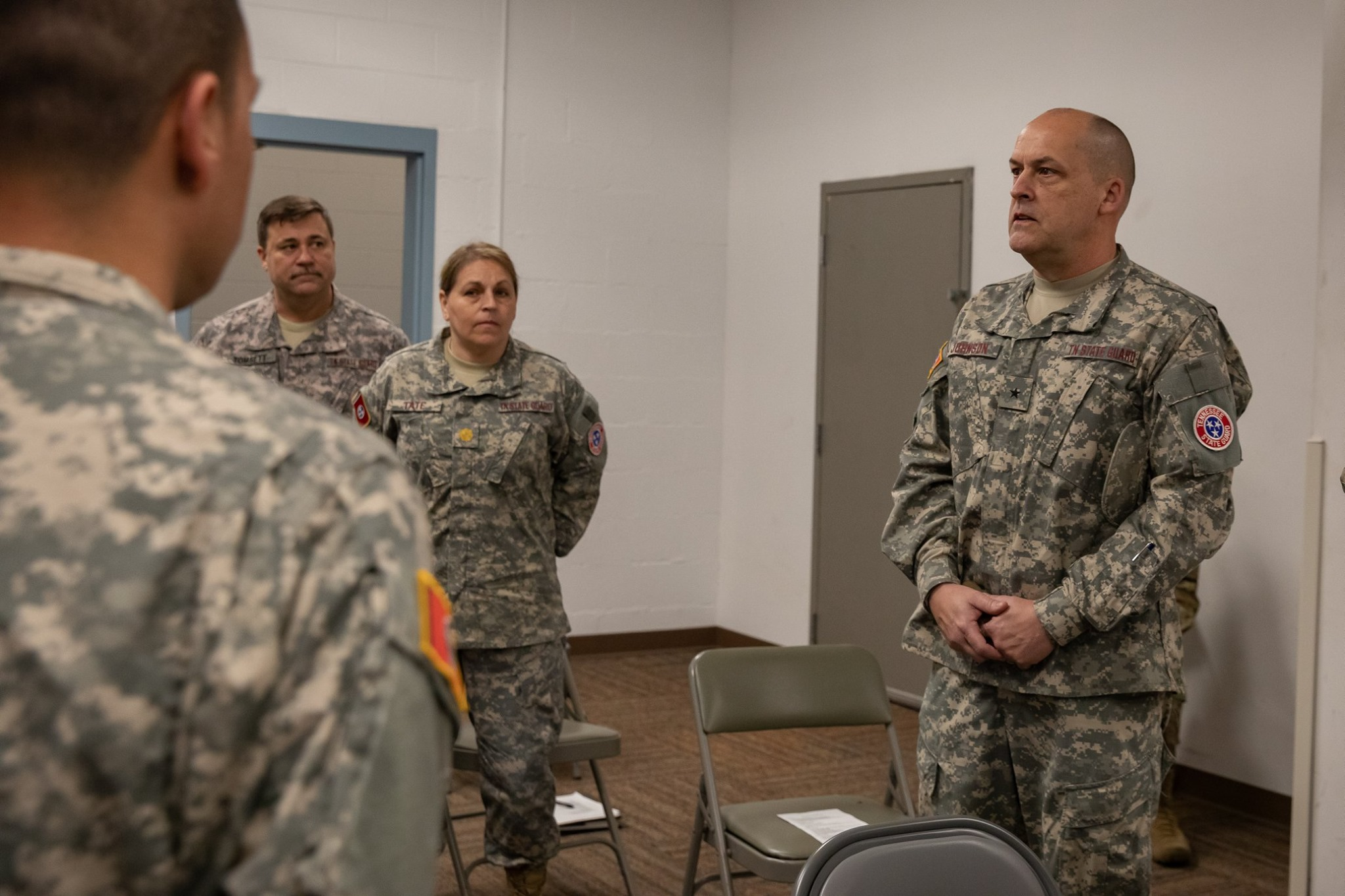
Tennessee State Guard members prepare for deployment in response to the 2020 coronavirus pandemic.

The organization's responsibilities are summarized in the mission statement of the Tennessee State Guard, namely: "The purpose of the Tennessee State Guard is to provide a professional complement of personnel to support the State mission of the Tennessee National Guard, by assisting the Tennessee Army National Guard as a force multiplier, and at the direction of the Adjutant General, to assist civil authorities with disaster relief, humanitarian causes, ceremonial service, religious and medical support for the well being and safety of the citizenry of Tennessee."

The Tennessee State Guard can be used to augment National Guard units in times of emergency, provide medical aid, security, funeral honors, high frequency (HF) communications and perform other stateside responsibilities generally performed by the Tennessee National Guard. The State Guard can serve as first responders to a natural or man-made disaster, and may integrate emergency response plans with local community emergency response teams. Aside from deploying to aid victims of Hurricane Katrina, and guarding military installations in the aftermath of the September 11 attacks, State Guardsmen, in preparing for their role as emergency response personnel, also participated in Operation Vigilant Guard in a disaster response drill organized as a mock earthquake disaster zone. Since the state guard is not a federal force, it is not prohibited from engaging in law enforcement by the Posse Comitatus Act, unlike federal military units. As the Tennessee State Guard generally provides non-combat support for the National Guard or state civilian authorities, guardsmen are not armed during duty, although no law exists which prevents them from being armed on the governor's orders.

Although the TNSG performs unarmed support roles during deployment, members of the TNSG regularly compete in the Mid-South Guard & Reserve Association M16 rifle and Beretta M9 pistol marksmanship competitions against Army, Navy, Air Force, Marine Corps, and Coast Guard reservists as well as members of the National Guard.

In 2014, at the request of the 194th Engineer Brigade of the Tennessee Army National Guard, several National Incident Management System (NIMS)-certified instructors from the 1st Regiment of the Tennessee State Guard provided NIMS training to members of the 194th Engineer Brigade over a two-day training period. The State Guard plans to continue providing emergency management training to National Guardsmen based in other cities.

In 2019, the 61st Medical Company (MEDCOM) participated in Operation Ardent/Shaken Fury, an eight state cooperative exercise responding to a large earthquake along the Mississippi River. As part of the exercise, the 61st MEDCOM trained to triage, treat and transport disaster victims in coordination with other participating entities.

== Membership ==
Any able-bodied citizen with a high school diploma or GED, who is a resident of Tennessee, and has no criminal record is eligible for membership, although preference is given to honorably discharged members of all six branches from the United States military. Civilians with specific professional skill sets, such as doctors, attorneys, chaplains or engineers, may be given preference for membership without prior military service. All officers must have at minimum earned a bachelor's degree.

== Training ==
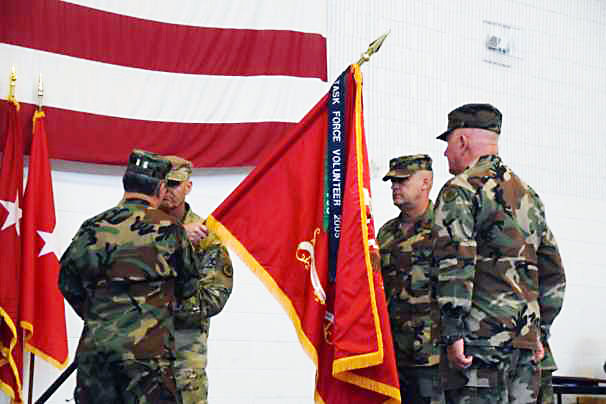
Brig. Gen. Kenneth Takasaki (L) relinquishes the colors to Brig. Gen. Tommy Baker, Assistant Adjutant General-Army, Tennessee National Guard.

New personnel with no prior military service are required to attend Initial Entry Training (IET) during their first year, usually held concurrently with Annual Training (AT). Prospective members are required to take several free online emergency management classes offered by the Federal Emergency Management Agency in order to earn the Military Emergency Management Specialist Badge. Tennessee State Guard training includes classes from the Tennessee Emergency Management Agency (TEMA). The Tennessee State Guard also provides online training courses through the SGAUS PME Academy. Training is conducted during drill days, which are held one day per month, and during an annual three-day drill during the summer.

All of the TNSG basic non-commissioned officer and basic officer courses are approved through the United States Army Training and Doctrine Command at Fort Monroe, Virginia. In 2015, the Tennessee State Guard initiated in-residence courses to include Advanced Leaders Course (ALC), Officer Basic Course (OBC) and Warrant Officer Basic Course (WOBC). These courses are generally conducted once per year concurrently with Annual Training (AT).

In 2010, the Tennessee State Guard launched a four-month military police class, with regiments from East Tennessee taking part in the pilot program taught at the Knoxville Police Headquarters.

== Uniforms ==
The TNSG uses the Army Combat Uniform (ACU) in the UCP pattern as its uniform. In the event that Tennessee State Guardsmen are assigned to work with the Tennessee National Guard as members of a flight crew, Guardsmen are authorized to wear the aircrew battle dress uniform (ABDU) if prescribed by the commander. For formal events, including military funerals and award ceremonies, the Dress Blue or Army Service Uniform (ASU) is optional for Guardsmen.

== Organization ==
The Tennessee State Guard is organized as a Directorate Headquarters with four regiments. The headquarters are in Nashville, Tennessee. Offices and directorates reporting directly to headquarters include:

- Directorate of Personnel Administration
- Directorate of Plans, Operations and Training
- Directorate of Security and Intelligence
- Directorate of Logistics
- Directorate of Civil/Military Support
- Directorate of Communications
- Directorate of Engineering Services
- Directorate of Training, Doctrine and Force Development
- Directorate of Information Services
- Headquarters Commandant
- Headquarters Surgeon Section
- Secretary to the General Staff
- Judge Advocate General Staff
- Office of the Inspector General
- Provost Marshal
- TNSG Academy
- Public Information Office
- Chaplains

The battalions of the TNSG are organized into four larger units: the 1st Tennessee Regiment, based in Millington; the 2nd Brigade Support team, based in Nashville; the 3rd Tennessee Regiment, based in Knoxville; and the 4th Tennessee Regiment, based in Chattanooga.

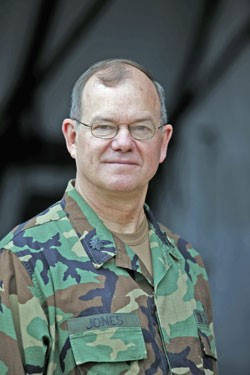
Lt. Col. Terry Jones, 1st Regiment, Tennessee State Guard, shown wearing the TNSG uniform.

The TNSG also includes the 61st Medical Company (MEDCOM) that provides medical command and support.

Battalions of the Tennessee State Guard
Regiment/Brigade	Battalion Name	Location
First Regiment	1st Infantry Battalion	Millington
	2nd Military Police Battalion	Jackson
	3rd Military Police Battalion	Trenton
	4th Military Police Battalion	Paris
Second Brigade Support Team	51st Forward Support Battalion	Nashville
3rd Tennessee Regiment	1st Infantry Battalion	Gray
	2nd Military Police Battalion	Jefferson City
	3rd Military Police Battalion	Kingsport
	4th Military Police Battalion	Maryville
4th Tennessee Regiment	1st Infantry Battalion	Chattanooga
	2nd Military Police Battalion	Cleveland
	3rd Military Police Battalion	McMinnville
	4th Military Police Battalion	Winchester

== Legal protection ==
Like National Guardsmen and federal reservists, state guard members receive protection from termination or other forms of discipline from their employers as a result of being called into active duty or drill status under Tennessee Code Annotated § 8-33-110.

== Awards and decorations ==
In addition to several ribbons issued by the TNSG, Tennessee State Guardsmen are allowed to wear decorations issued by other military institutions, including ribbons, decorations, and badges issued by the following institutions in order of precedence:

- Awards from the eight Uniformed services of the United States, which includes the six branches of the United States Armed Forces (both federal and reserve), the United States Public Health Service, and the National Oceanographic and Atmospheric Administration
- Awards from foreign nations approved for wear by the U.S. Armed Forces
- Awards issued by the Tennessee Army or Air National Guard, or a different state's National Guard
- Tennessee State Guard awards
- Civil Air Patrol awards
- Coast Guard Auxiliary awards
- Awards from other authorized state defense forces (pending approval from the TNSG commanding general)
- Awards from the State Guard Association of the United States

State Guardsmen who have earned the Combat Infantry Badge, the Parachutist Badge, the Ranger tab, the Pilot Wings, the Air Crewman Wings, the Submarine Warfare insignia, the Diver insignia, the SEAL Trident, or other awards or badges while in federal service may wear them on the TNSG uniform as prescribed by the United States Army uniform regulations.

=== Individual ribbons ===
The Tennessee State Guard issues the following awards:

- TNSG Valor Ribbon
- TNSG Alvin C. York Ribbon
- TNSG Distinguished Service Ribbon
- TNSG Meritorious Service Ribbon
- TNSG Com. Gen. Letter of Commendation Ribbon
- TNSG Commendation Ribbon
- TNSG Wound Ribbon
- TNSG Life Saving Ribbon
- TNSG Officer Achievement Ribbon
- TNSG Enlisted Achievement Ribbon
- TNSG TN Defense Service Ribbon
- TNSG Search & Rescue Ribbon
- TNSG Aid to Civil Authority Ribbon
- TNSG Operation Desert Storm/Shield Ribbon
- TNSG Operation Enduring Freedom Ribbon
- TNSG Operation Task Force Volunteer Ribbon
- TNSG Community Volunteer Service Ribbon
- TNSG Soldier of the Year Ribbon
- TNSG Good Conduct Ribbon
- TNSG Officer Training
- TNSG NCO Training Ribbon
- TNSG Basic Entry Level Training
- TNSG Chaplain's Ribbon
- TNSG Volunteer Service Ribbon
- TNSG Recruitment Achievement Ribbon
- TNSG Recruiter's Ribbon
- TNSG Military Readiness Ribbon
- TNSG Service Ribbon

== See also ==
- Naval militia
- Tennessee Air National Guard
- Tennessee Wing Civil Air Patrol
- United States Coast Guard Auxiliary
