= Tennessee Military Department =

Military component for the state of Tennessee; includes National Guard and State Guard

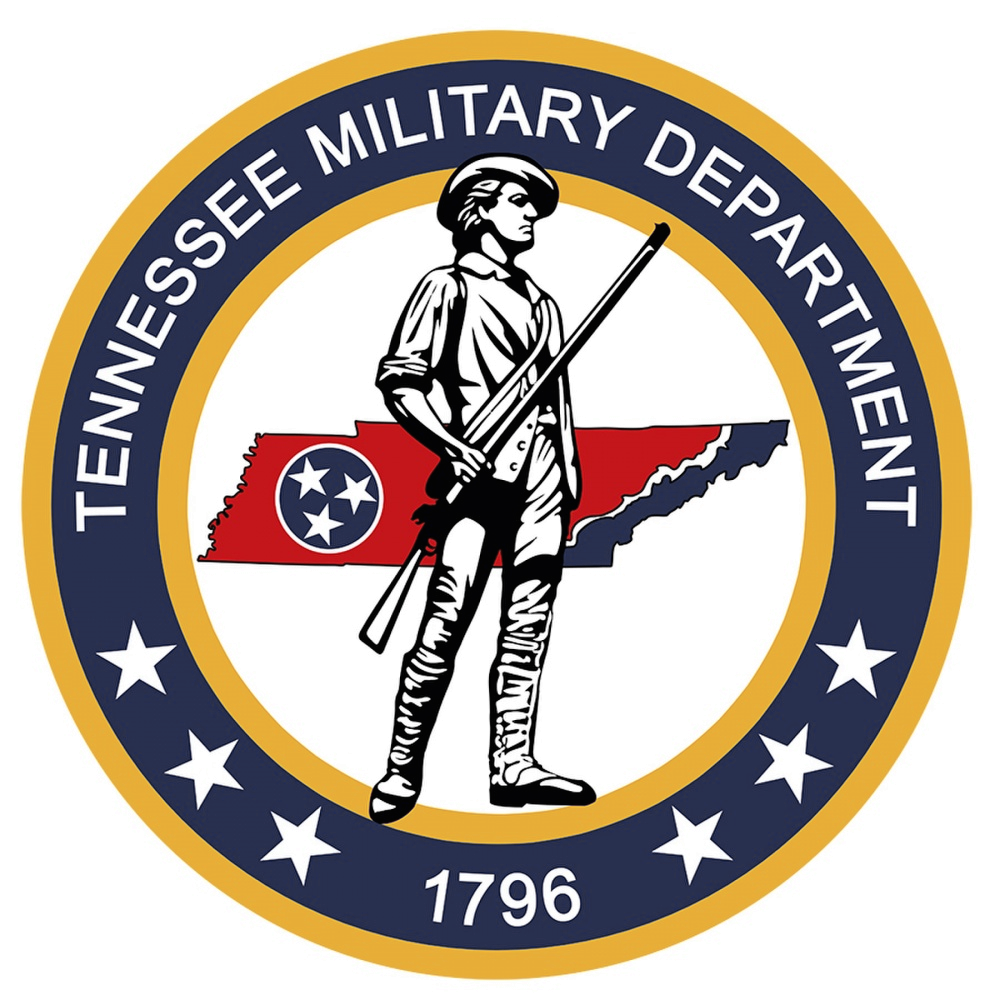
- Seal of the Tennessee Military Department

Agency overview
- Jurisdiction: Tennessee
- Headquarters: Nashville, Tennessee; 36.099207°N 86.756892°W
- Motto: "Always there when you need us."
- Employees: 12,000+ full-time federal employees 550+ state employees 16,000+ traditional Guard members
- Annual budget: $450,000,000
- Agency executives: Major General Jeffrey H. Holmes, Adjutant General, Tennessee Military Department; Major General Tommy H. Baker, Assistant Adjutant General, Army, Tennessee Military Department; Colonel Jason W. Glass, Assistant Adjutant General, Air, Tennessee Military Department
- Child agencies: Tennessee Army National Guard; Tennessee Air National Guard; Tennessee State Guard; Tennessee Emergency Management Agency

The Tennessee Military Department is a department within the Executive Branch of Tennessee State Government with four major components. The Tennessee Army National Guard and the Tennessee Air National Guard constitute the National Guard in Tennessee. The Tennessee Emergency Management Agency (TEMA), and the Tennessee State Guard are the other major components of the Military Department.

The Tennessee Army National Guard includes the 230th Sustainment Brigade, 278th Armored Cavalry Regiment, 194th Engineer Brigade, and the 30th Troop Command.

The Tennessee Air National Guard includes the 118th Wing, the 134th Air Refueling Wing, the 164th Airlift Wing and the 119th Command and Control Squadron.

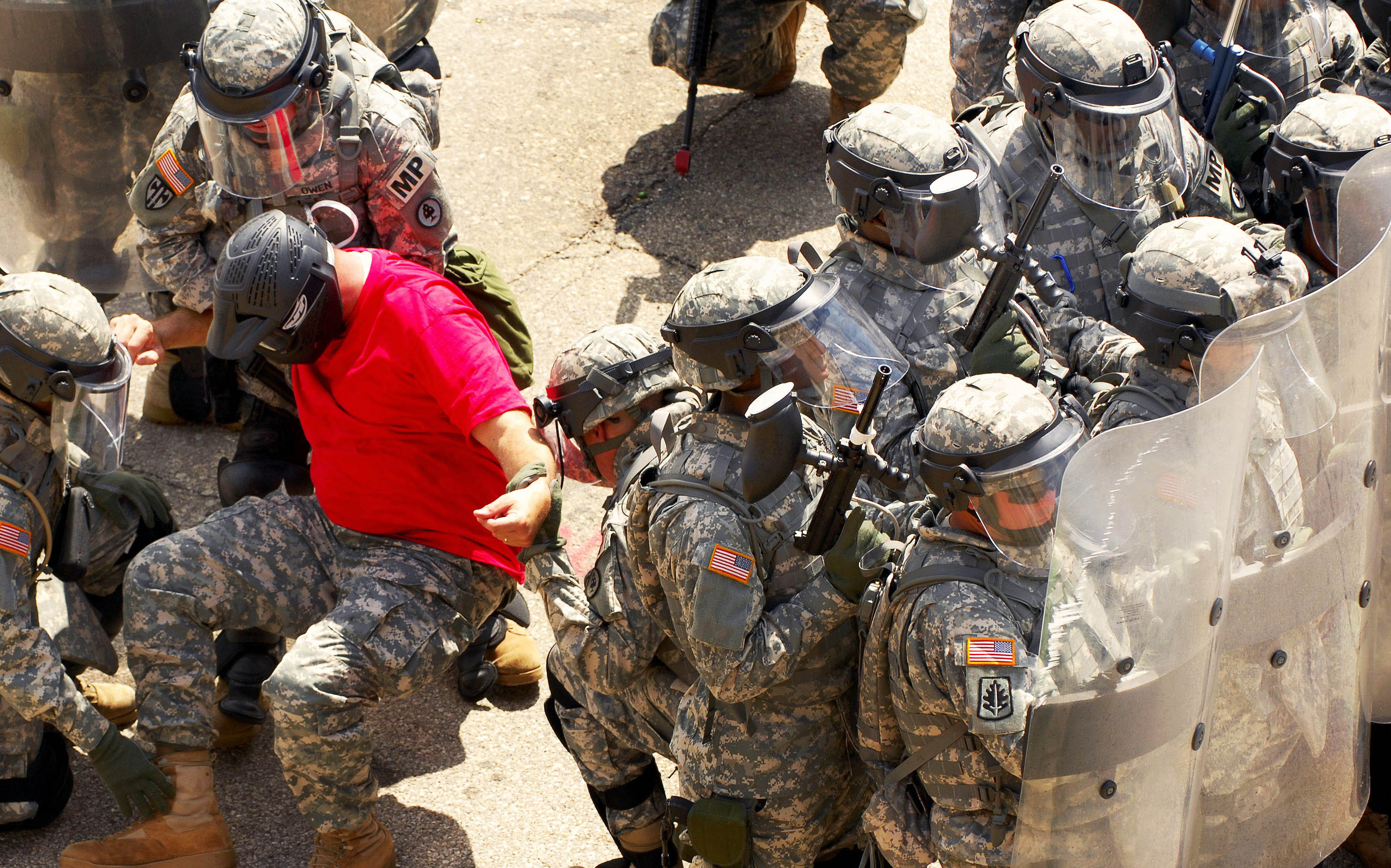
Tennessee National Guardsmen conducting riot training

The Tennessee Emergency Management Agency (TEMA) provides state-level emergency management, coordinating federal assistance through FEMA, tasking state agencies for resources, and supporting local government emergency management agencies.

The Tennessee State Guard is a state defense force, a volunteer reserve force which may be activated whenever any part of the Tennessee National Guard is in active federal service.

The department has over 550 state employees plus over 12,000 federal employees. The five Guard components have over 16,000 officers and enlisted personnel with a $450+ million dollar budget. The adjutant general heads the department and is appointed by the governor. Beside the five commands, the Bureau of War Records reports to the adjutant general. The Joint Public Affairs Office maintains the organization's social media presence, official website and magazine

The Military Department headquarters is located in Nashville, Tennessee. Guard units and state armories are located in each county. TEMA has staff and facilities located across the state.

The military department, through the National Guard, runs the Tennessee National Guard Volunteer ChalleNGe Academy.
