= Abraham Childers =

American politician and pioneer

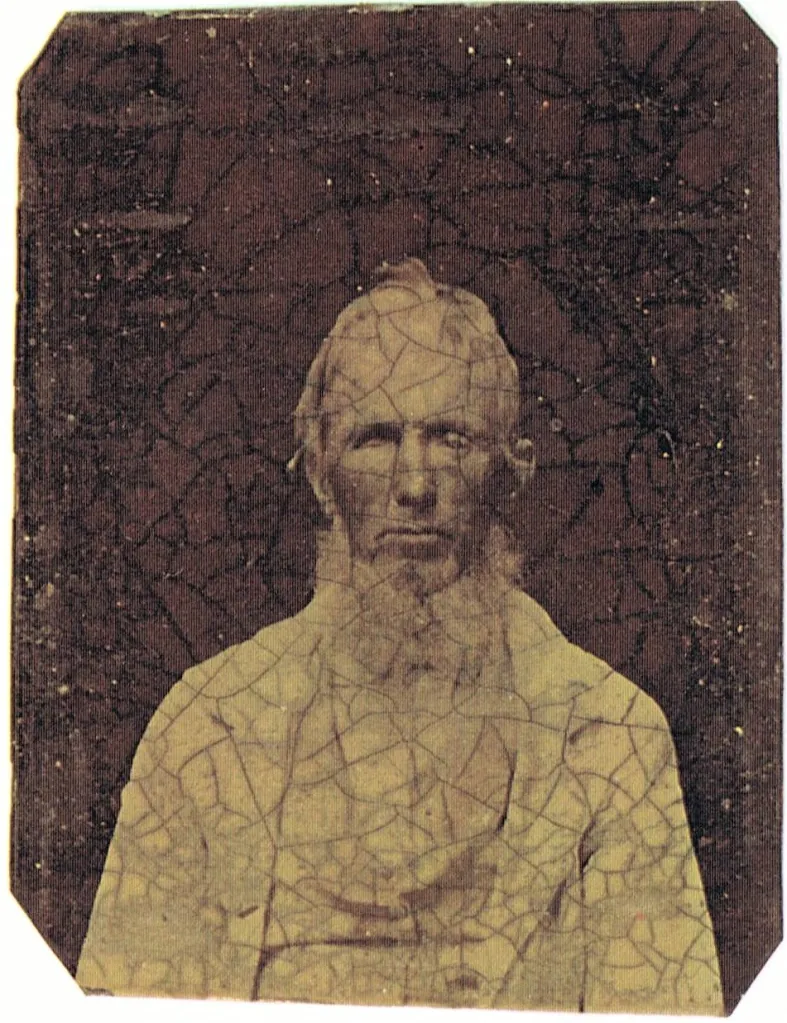
- Childers c. 1840s

Member of the Kentucky Senate
- In office 1804–1806

Personal details
- Born: Abraham Childers V November 15, 1750 Buckingham County (later Albemarle County), Colony of Virginia, British America
- Died: May 6, 1849 (aged 98) Letcher County, Kentucky, U.S.
- Party: Democratic-Republican
- Spouse: Elizabeth Roberts (m. 1786; died 1833)
- Children: 10
- Occupation: Planter; soldier; politician; surveyor; frontiersman

Military service
- Allegiance: United States
- Branch/service: Continental Army
- Years of service: 1777–1781
- Rank: Corporal
- Unit: 5th Virginia Regiment
- Battles/wars: American Revolutionary War; Battle of Brandywine; Philadelphia campaign; Battle of Guilford Court House

Abraham Childers V (November 15, 1750 – May 6, 1849) was an American pioneer, planter, politician, and Continental Army soldier who served as the personal cook to General George Washington during the American Revolutionary War. A member of the Democratic-Republican Party, he served in the Kentucky Senate from 1804 to 1806.

Born into the American gentry in colonial Virginia, Childers was raised on a slave plantation in western Virginia. In 1777, he enlisted in the Continental Army and was wounded at the Battle of Brandywine. After serving as a cook, he fought in the Battle of Guilford Court House and was discharged in 1781. In 1797, Childers traveled the Wilderness Road through the Cumberland Gap and settled his family in Kentucky. From 1801 to 1804, he served as Justice of the Peace of Perry County and was later elected to the Kentucky General Assembly.

== Early life ==
Abraham Childers V was born on November 15, 1750, in Buckingham County (later Albemarle County), Colony of Virginia, British America, to Abraham Henry Childers and Susannah Goolsby. His paternal ancestors descend from Abraham Childers I, an English immigrant who settled along the James River, near Curles Neck, in the mid-1600s. Childers was raised at his father's plantation on the Tye River in Amherst County, Virginia. He was educated in surveying.

== Military service ==
In March 1777, Childers enlisted in the Continental Army during the American War of Independence. He served in the 5th Virginia Regiment of the Virginia Line under Captain Samuel Jordan Cabell. Childers was wounded in action at the Battle of Brandywine while fighting alongside his brother, Moseby Childers, who was killed in action.

During the war, Childers served as a military cook to General George Washington, assigned to the headquarters of the Commander-in-Chief. He served in the position for approximately 18 months during the Philadelphia campaign.

Following his service as a cook, Childers saw action in the Carolinas at the Battle of Guilford Court House in 1781. Attaining the rank of corporal, he was discharged from service in Winchester, Virginia, one month after the surrender of Lord Cornwallis at Yorktown.

=== Pension disputes ===
In October 1832, Childers applied for a federal veteran's pension. His application faced severe bureaucratic hurdles and scrutiny; affidavits provided by local neighbors and his son, William Childers, revealed that while Abraham was "a man of truth when sober," he was frequently "addicted to drink and upon public occasions he most generally got so drunk he was not capable of attending to any business." Due to procedural inconsistencies, lost company rosters, and his inability to secure living witnesses from his regiment, his pension application was ultimately rejected—a common outcome for many veterans of the American Revolution.

== Kentucky frontier ==
Following the war, Childers married Elizabeth Roberts in Russell County, Virginia, in 1786. Elizabeth was the daughter of Cornelius Roberts, a prominent militia leader who was later killed by Native Americans in 1788. In July 1797, Childers sold his holdings in Russell County and moved to eastern Kentucky in Appalachia. The family travelled the Wilderness Road through the Cumberland Gap and initially settled in Floyd County, before relocating to a section of Perry County that would later be organized into Letcher County.

In 1801, Childers was elected as Justice of the Peace of Perry County, serving until 1804. A member of the Democratic-Republican Party, he was elected to the Kentucky State Senate, serving from 1804 to 1806.

== Personal life and death ==
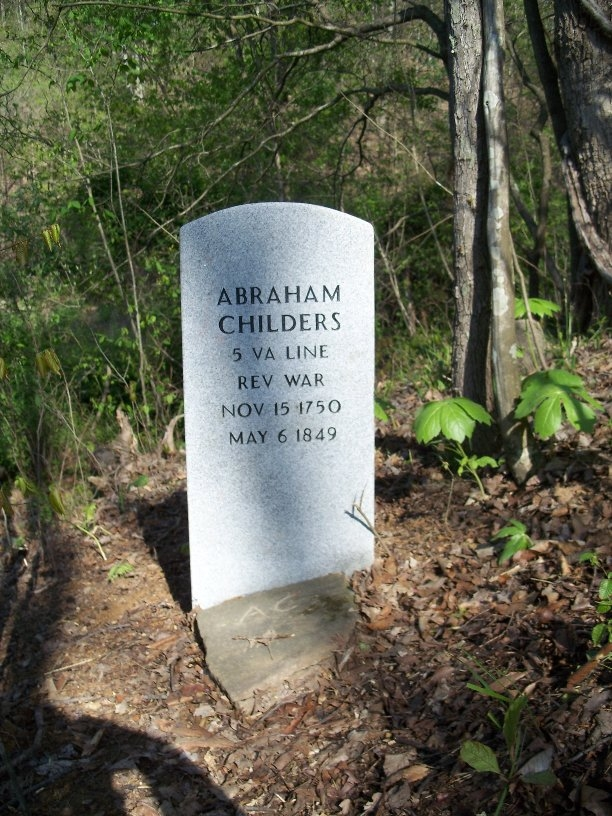
Childers' grave in 2024

Childers was Protestant. He married his wife, Elizabeth Roberts, in 1786; she died in 1833. They had at least ten children; one of their sons served in the Confederate States Army.

Childers died on May 6, 1849, at the age of 98, in Letcher County, Kentucky. He was interred at the Breeding Creek Cemetery in Knott County, Kentucky.

On April 24, 2008, local historical preservationists and the Colonel Ben Caudill Camp of the Sons of Confederate Veterans installed an official military tombstone at his gravesite to honor his contributions to American independence.

== See also ==
- John Allen
- Thomas Posey
- Richard Stephens
