= Evelyn Sharp =

Evelyn Sharp may refer to:

- Evelyn Sharp (aviator) (1919–1944), American aviator
- Evelyn Sharp (businesswoman) (died 1997), American hotelier
- Evelyn Sharp (suffragist) (1869–1955), British suffragist and author
- Evelyn Sharp, Baroness Sharp (1903–1985), British civil servant
- Evelyn Sharp / Artemis, a fictional character from Arrow
