= J. Sussman, Inc. =

J. Sussman, Inc
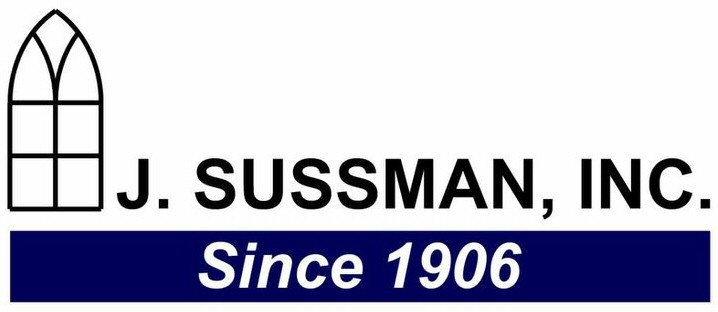
- Industry: Architectural Windows
- Founded: 1906
- Founder: Isadore Sussman
- Headquarters: Jamaica, Queens, New York City, New York, United States
- Area served: International (mainly North America)
- Key people: Isadore Sussman, Jack Sussman, Steven Sussman, David Sussman
- Products: Custom Architectural Aluminum Windows
- Services: Manufacturers of custom architectural aluminum windows, skylights, sun-rooms. Glass and Metal bending services
- Subsidiaries: Sunbilt Creative Sunrooms
- Website: J. Sussman Inc.

J. Sussman, Inc. is a family business established in 1906 that manufactures custom windows and specializes in aluminum extrusions for the stained and leaded art glass trade. The business is also known for bending aluminum and glass. It is located in Jamaica, Queens, a neighborhood of New York City. J. Sussman, Inc. relies on solar energy to power its factory. They have one of the largest solar panel installations in the Queens area.

== History ==
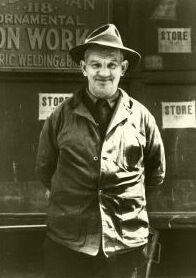
Isadore Sussman, founder

J. Sussman, Inc. was founded by Isadore Sussman in 1906. Isadore learned the iron working trade in Poland before moving to England where he learned to make windows. When he arrived in America, Isadore set up shop in the living room of his apartment on the Lower East Side of Manhattan. Isadore convinced a nearby stained glass studio into letting him make some windows for a church they were working on. Isadore quickly developed a reputation in New York City for building church windows. His work is still present in many of New York's cathedrals.

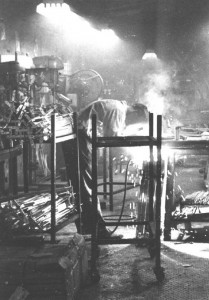
Isadore's son, Jack, welding in the factory.

In the late 40s, Isadore's son Jack took over and continued the business. Although they had long ago moved out of Isadore's living room, the business still consisted of Isadore working with a hammer, anvil and forge and several apprentices making windows. Jack took it a step further: he combined new processes with his father's traditional techniques, and for the first time they advertised. Isadore and Jack brought the business from a regional to a national company.

In the 1950s, Jack Sussman designed aluminum extrusions specifically for stained glass windows. It was a big investment for a small metal shop but the gamble paid off. Jack was able to produce a better window for less money. His company became one of the leading church window manufacturers in the country. With experience in bending metal, J. Sussman Inc. started bending glass too. As the demand for custom windows increased, J, Sussman Inc. started making custom architectural windows for commercial buildings.

In the '70s, David and Steven Sussman—Isadore's grandchildren—joined the business and brought it a step further. They developed thermally broken windows and opened up markets in sloped glazing applications such as skylights and greenhouses. Besides bending architectural systems, they were bending handrails, lighting fixtures, signs, shower doors, furniture and a host of other products for numerous industries. In the 1990s, the fourth generation of Robin, Jake, Jon and Josh came into the family business. The thermal window lines were updated to the advanced thermal strip technology and new lines of historical replication windows and equal sitelines with concealed ventilators windows were introduced.

== Projects ==
=== Windows ===
J. Sussman, Inc's work can be seen in St. Patrick's Cathedral, the Hoover Dam, the former American Airlines building at JFK Airport, and in the Chagall Windows at the Hadassa Medical Center in Jerusalem. Many of their projects have been installed across the world. However, much of J. Sussman's work can be seen around southeast Queens. They made windows for the recently renovated Jamaica Performing Arts Center and for the Jamaica Market. The company also worked on windows for St. Thomas Moore Church at St. John's University, and St. David's Episcopal Anglican Church in Cambria Heights. J. Sussman also made the windows for the Paramount Building on 1501 Broadway.

=== Solar panels ===
In September 2010, they installed more than 550 solar panels onto its roof, stretching across roughly 13,000 square feet. This makes it one of the largest solar panel installations in Queens. The idea came from the Greater Jamaica Development Corporation, which approached them in early 2010. The development group helped Sussman ferret out city, state and federal tax credits, incentives and grants. The programs brought the tab of the project down from 619,000 to just 62,000.

The Sussman family believed that because their business was spending about 20,000 a year to power the plant, the Solar Power System will pay itself off in about 3 years. Steven Sussman said "It's going to virtually all of our electric needs, we've done the numbers and we expect it to pay off in 3 years." He also said "Energy is getting so expensive it becoming prohibitive to do manufacturing in New York" David Sussman added, "I love that we can get our energy from a renewable resource instead of destroying the environment. It's a win-win situation." The panels were installed by Brooklyn-based Solar Energy Systems and are made of silicon cells sheathed in glass. Richard Werber, director of Business Services at Greater Jamaica, said "J.Sussman is the poster child for other companies in southeast Queens."

=== Sunbilt Creative Sunrooms ===
An affiliated company of J. Sussman, Inc., Sunbilt Solar Products, manufactures custom sunrooms and greenhouses.

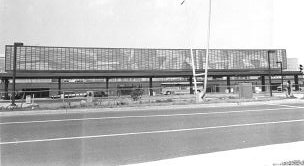
American Airlines Building, JFK Airport

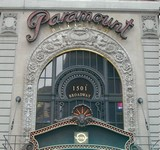
The Paramount Building, Times Square

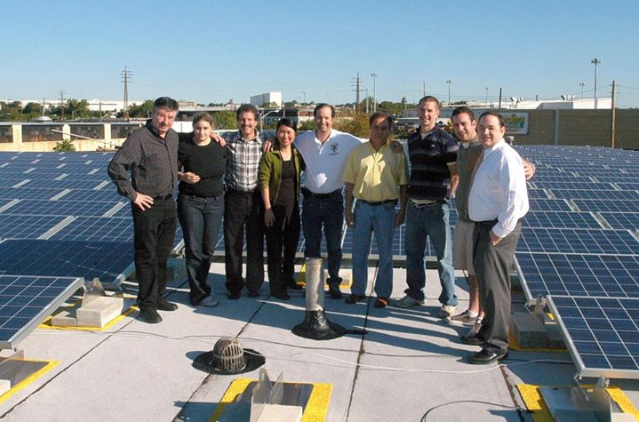
The crew of J. Sussman, Inc. stands in front of the solar panel installation

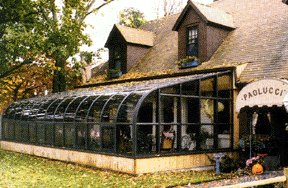
Commercial Built Sunroom

== Award ==
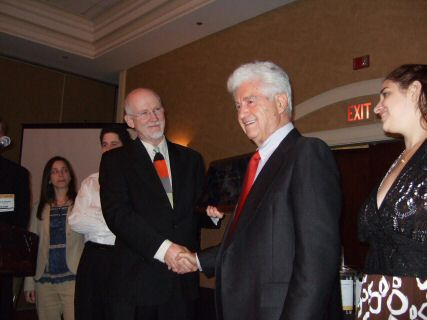
Jack Sussman being handed the 2007 Lifetime Achievement Award by the Stained Glass Association of America

Jack Sussman was awarded a lifetime achievement award from the Stained Glass Association of America in the summer of 2007.
