= GTY =

GTY could refer to:

- Gatley railway station, England, station code
- Gettysburg Regional Airport, Pennsylvania, US, IATA airport code
