= Susquehanna Area Regional Airport Authority =

The Susquehanna Area Regional Airport Authority (SARAA) is the governing authority of the Harrisburg International Airport, Capital City Airport, Franklin County Regional Airport and Gettysburg Regional Airport in south-central Pennsylvania. SARAA was incorporated on September 9, 1997, and officially took over control of the MDT and CXY airports from the Commonwealth of Pennsylvania on January 1, 1998.

== History ==
SARAA was the culmination of an effort that began in the 1990s by the counties of Cumberland, Dauphin, and York and the cities of Harrisburg and York. The counties and cities placed a major emphasis on air transportation that led to a study of the aviation needs of the region. In 1996, the results of the study led to the formation of the Airport Divestiture Group (ADG, chaired by Robert F. Frazier) to negotiate the divestiture of both Harrisburg International Airport (MDT) and Capital City Airport (CXY) from the Pennsylvania Department of Transportation Bureau of Aviation to an independent regional entity. The recipient of these airports was the Susquehanna Area Regional Airports Authority (SARAA, initially chaired by Frazier) which assumed title to, and operation of, the initial pair of airports (MDT and CXY) on and after January 1, 1998.

In 2004, the Franklin County Regional Airport, located near Chambersburg, Pennsylvania, was bought by the airport authority. SARAA now operates four airports in the greater Harrisburg metropolitan area.

On August 25, 2006, SARAA acquired the Gettysburg Regional Airport (GRA), formerly identified as the Gettysburg Airport and Travel Center. GRA opened in 1926 and had been a privately operated general aviation service airport. It is located on roughly 47 acres (190,000 m^{2}) just outside Gettysburg, Adams County, Pennsylvania.

== See also ==
- List of airports in Pennsylvania
