= Capital City Airport (Pennsylvania) =

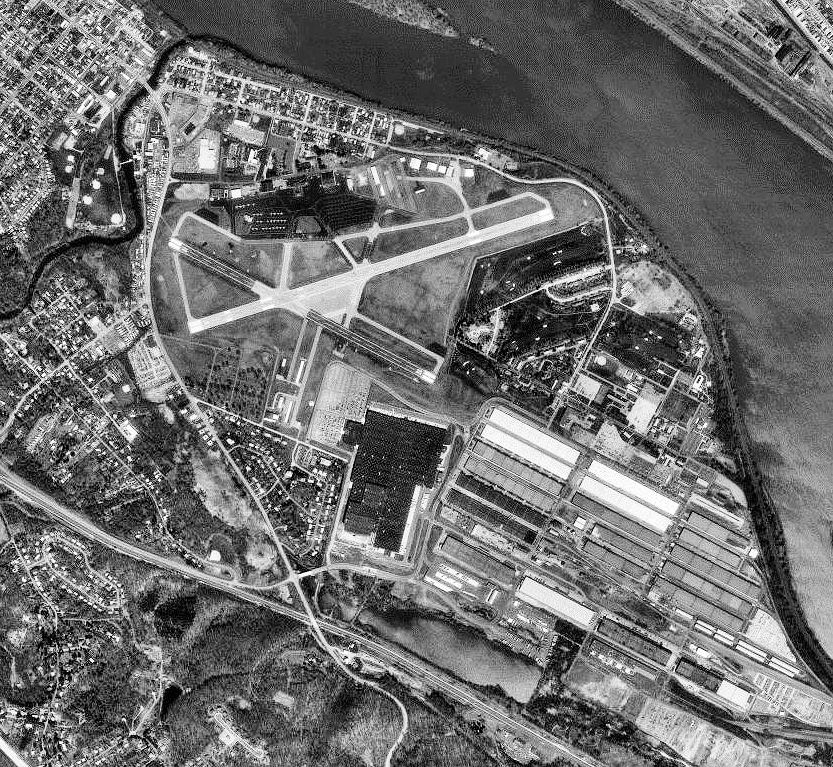
- IATA: HAR; ICAO: KCXY; FAA LID: CXY

Summary
- Airport type: Public
- Owner/Operator: Susquehanna Area Regional Airport Authority
- Serves: Harrisburg, Pennsylvania
- Location: Fairview Township, York County, near New Cumberland, Pennsylvania
- Elevation AMSL: 347 ft (106 m)
- Coordinates: 40°13′02″N 076°51′05″W
- Website: www.flycxy.com

Maps
- FAA diagram
- Location within Pennsylvania Location within the United States

Runways
Direction	Length		Surface
Direction	ft	m	Surface
8/26	5,000	1,524	Asphalt
12/30	3,778	1,152	Asphalt

Statistics (2023)
- Aircraft operations (year ending 5/3/2023): 27,348
- Based aircraft: 97
- Source: Federal Aviation Administration

Capital City Airport (IATA: HAR, ICAO: KCXY, FAA LID: CXY) is a public airport in Fairview Township, York County, Pennsylvania, three miles (5 km) southeast of Harrisburg, the capital of Pennsylvania.

Most U.S. airports use the same three-letter location identifier for the FAA and IATA, but Capital City Airport is CXY to the FAA and HAR to the IATA (which assigned CXY to Cat Cays Airport, Bimini Islands, Bahamas.)

== Overview ==
The airport is the home airport for the Pennsylvania Bureau of Aviation and the Pennsylvania State Police. It averages more than 57,000 corporate, charter, and private aircraft operations a year. Owned and operated by the Susquehanna Area Regional Airport Authority (SARAA), Capital City Airport is the designated reliever and sister airport of Harrisburg International Airport, and serves Dauphin, Cumberland, and York counties.

A study by the PA Department of Transportation in 2000 concluded that Capital City Airport related activities generate nearly $24 million a year in economic output.

== Facilities ==
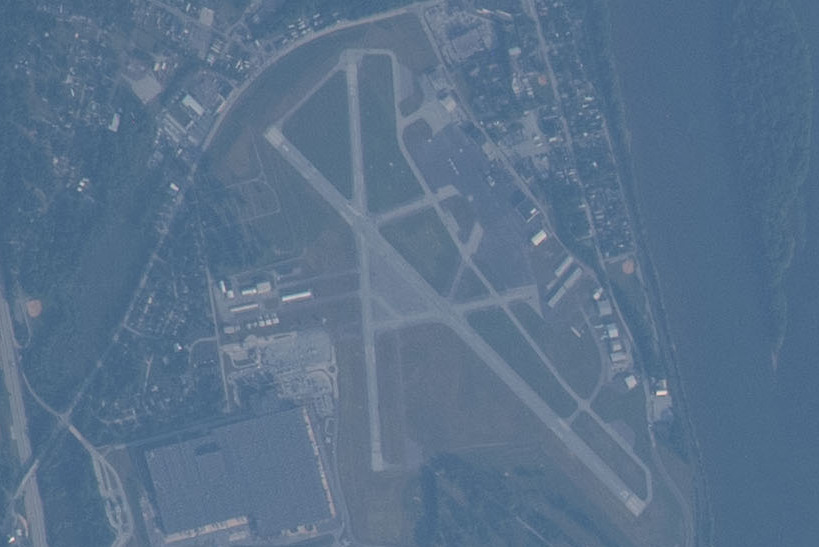
Cropped from the photo underneath; north is oriented towards the right

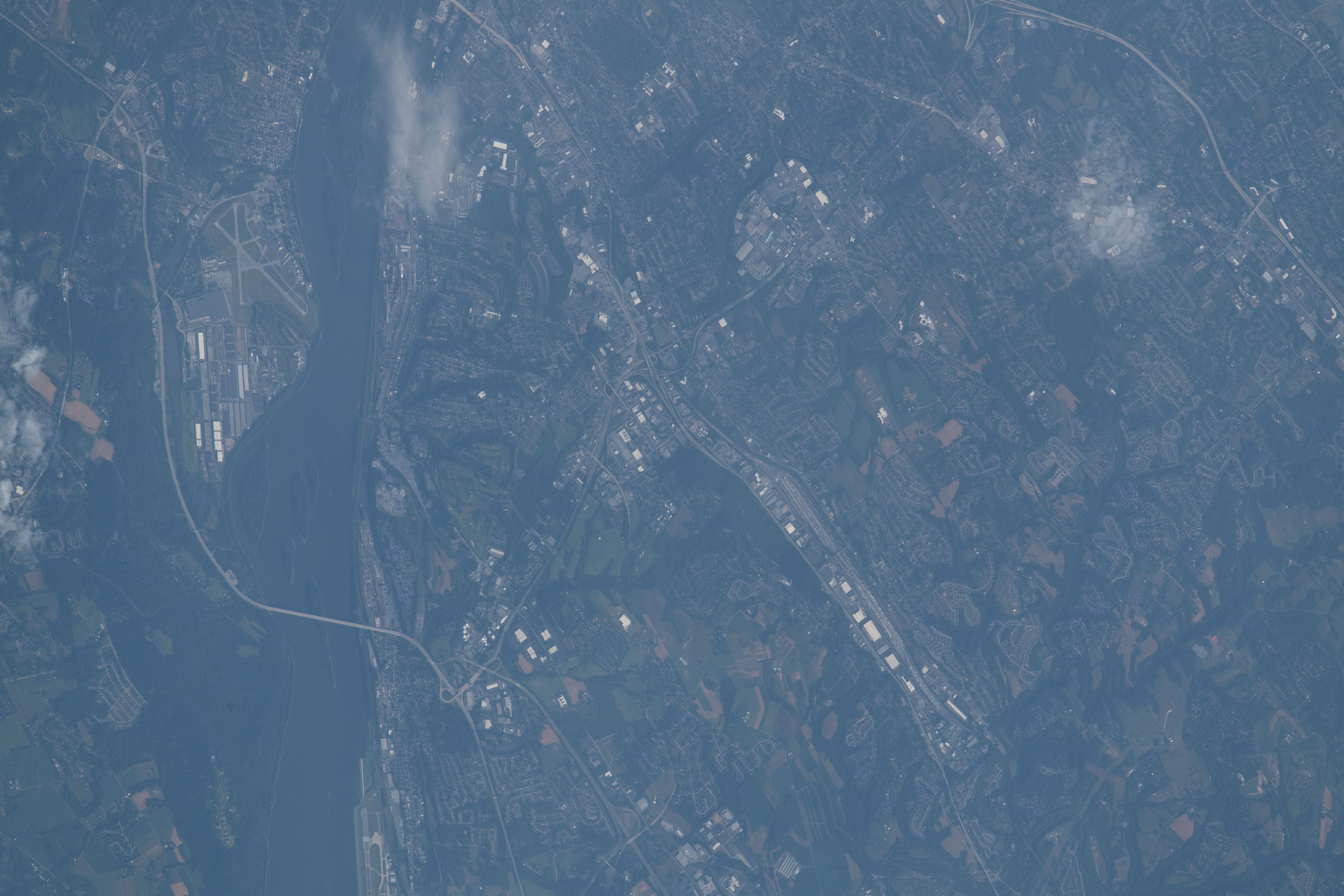
The airport (upper left) and vicinity on July 6, 2022; taken from the International Space Station with north oriented towards the right.

Capital City Airport covers 320 acres (130 ha) and has two asphalt runways: 8/26 is 5,000 x 150 ft (1,524 x 46 m) and 12/30 is 3,778 x 100 ft (1,152 x 30 m).

In the year ending May 3, 2023, the airport had 27,348 aircraft operations, average 75 a day: 88% general aviation, 10% military, and 2% air taxi. 97 aircraft were based at the airport: 74 single-engine, 13 multi-engine, 6 jet, and 4 military.

== History ==
Originally Capital Landing Field, the airport opened in mid-1930 and was Harrisburg's first airline airport. On October 25, 1930, a Ford Trimotor airplane flying the first transcontinental air mail stopped at the airport. In 1934 the Commonwealth of Pennsylvania purchased it and renamed it Harrisburg-York State Airport. It was a stop on longer air routes, principally between Pittsburgh and Philadelphia. The airline was Transcontinental and Western Airlines which became TWA and remained until 1968. (DC-9s replaced TWA's last Constellations in 1967; the 4970-ft runway was one of the shortest in the country to see airline jets.) Allegheny and Capital/United appeared in the 1940s; United pulled out in 1966.

In the 1940s the airport handled war materials for the former adjacent New Cumberland Army Depot and hosted the Naval Photographic Reconnaissance Training School. The Army Air Corps stationed the 101st and 103d Observation Squadrons at Harrisburg early in the war to train pilots in observation and aerial photography. Later the Army Air Force formed the 6th Fighter Wing and 47th Bombardment Wing at the airport before their deployment overseas. New Cumberland Army depot remains although it has gone through several name changes over the years. It has been known as Defense Distribution Center (DDC) New Cumberland, Defense Distribution Region East (DDRE), and the Defense Distribution Supply Point (DDSP) Susquehanna. Currently it is known as the Defense Logistics Agency (DLA) Susquehanna, one of the largest military distribution centers for supplies and equipment for the U.S. Armed Forces

Olmsted Air Force Base, just across the river in Middletown was also close, and in 1968 Allegheny and TWA moved there to newly named Harrisburg International Airport. Capital City Airport then got its current name and became a general aviation airport.

Since 1999 Capital City Airport has been owned and operated by the Susquehanna Area Regional Airport Authority (SARAA). CXY is the designated reliever and sister airport of Harrisburg International Airport, and serves Dauphin, Cumberland, and York counties.

== Accidents near CXY ==
- On April 3, 1944, a Lockheed P-38 Lightning crashed northwest of the airport just after takeoff. The P-38 experienced an engine failure and made a "pancake" landing that thrust the landing gear into the cockpit, killing the pilot - Evelyn Genevieve "Sharpie" Sharp - instantly. The crash occurred on what is now the Peiffer Memorial Arboretum and Nature Preserve which contains memorials to Sharp, including one at the crash site.
- On December 25, 1944, a USAAF Douglas C-47 crashed on approach when it flew into the side of a hill, 5km (3.1 miles) SW of CXY. Twelve occupants out of 27 on board were killed.

== See also ==
- List of airports in Pennsylvania
- Pennsylvania World War II Army Airfields
