= Melstone, Montana =

- Town
- Location in Musselshell County and the state of Montana
- Coordinates: 46°35′49″N 107°52′21″W
- Country: United States
- State: Montana
- County: Musselshell

Area
  - Total: 0.61 sq mi (1.59 km^{2})
  - Land: 0.61 sq mi (1.59 km^{2})
  - Water: 0 sq mi (0.00 km^{2})
- Elevation: 2,914 ft (888 m)

Population (2020)
  - Total: 126
  - Density: 204.9/sq mi (79.13/km^{2})
- Time zone: UTC-7 (Mountain (MST))
  - Summer (DST): UTC-6 (MDT)
- ZIP code: 59054
- Area code: 406
- FIPS code: 30-49000
- GNIS feature ID: 2412981

Melstone is a town in Musselshell County, Montana, United States. The population was 126 at the 2020 census. The town was established in 1908 as a base for operating crews on the Chicago, Milwaukee, St. Paul and Pacific Railroad, then under construction in Montana. Although the railroad was abandoned in 1980, Melstone survives as a community center for farmers and ranchers in the lower Musselshell River valley.

Melstone was named for Melvin Stone, a journalist for the Chicago Tribune. He happened to be on a train where the person sitting next to him, the railroad president, asked his name and impulsively decided to name the community after him.

The Melstone Oil Field west of town developed in the 1950s and saw renewed production in the 1990s.

== Geography ==
Melstone is located on the north side of the Musselshell River valley in eastern Musselshell County, about 2 miles (3 km) west of the Rosebud County line. U.S. Route 12 passes through the town, leading west-southwest 35 miles (56 km) to Roundup, the Musselshell county seat, and southeast 67 miles (108 km) to Forsyth.

According to the U.S. Census Bureau, Melstone has an area of 0.62 square miles (1.61 km^{2}), all land.

=== Climate ===
According to the Köppen Climate Classification system, Melstone has a semi-arid climate, abbreviated "BSk" on climate maps.

Climate data for Melstone, Montana, 1991–2020 normals, extremes 1909–present
Month	Jan	Feb	Mar	Apr	May	Jun	Jul	Aug	Sep	Oct	Nov	Dec	Year
Record high °F (°C)	70 (21)	77 (25)	81 (27)	92 (33)	97 (36)	108 (42)	111 (44)	110 (43)	106 (41)	99 (37)	80 (27)	71 (22)	111 (44)
Mean maximum °F (°C)	57.9 (14.4)	60.9 (16.1)	71.2 (21.8)	80.3 (26.8)	87.4 (30.8)	95.4 (35.2)	100.9 (38.3)	99.8 (37.7)	95.1 (35.1)	84.4 (29.1)	69.1 (20.6)	58.0 (14.4)	102.4 (39.1)
Mean daily maximum °F (°C)	34.8 (1.6)	38.0 (3.3)	48.7 (9.3)	58.6 (14.8)	67.8 (19.9)	77.6 (25.3)	87.6 (30.9)	86.8 (30.4)	75.5 (24.2)	59.9 (15.5)	45.8 (7.7)	35.7 (2.1)	59.7 (15.4)
Daily mean °F (°C)	24.6 (−4.1)	27.4 (−2.6)	36.6 (2.6)	45.9 (7.7)	55.1 (12.8)	64.4 (18.0)	72.6 (22.6)	71.1 (21.7)	60.8 (16.0)	47.3 (8.5)	35.1 (1.7)	26.0 (−3.3)	47.2 (8.5)
Mean daily minimum °F (°C)	14.4 (−9.8)	16.7 (−8.5)	24.6 (−4.1)	33.3 (0.7)	42.4 (5.8)	51.2 (10.7)	57.5 (14.2)	55.5 (13.1)	46.0 (7.8)	34.8 (1.6)	24.5 (−4.2)	16.2 (−8.8)	34.8 (1.5)
Mean minimum °F (°C)	−14.0 (−25.6)	−8.8 (−22.7)	1.0 (−17.2)	18.2 (−7.7)	27.9 (−2.3)	39.5 (4.2)	47.4 (8.6)	43.0 (6.1)	31.1 (−0.5)	15.6 (−9.1)	0.7 (−17.4)	−9.8 (−23.2)	−23.7 (−30.9)
Record low °F (°C)	−43 (−42)	−51 (−46)	−35 (−37)	−10 (−23)	8 (−13)	23 (−5)	35 (2)	32 (0)	18 (−8)	−9 (−23)	−30 (−34)	−43 (−42)	−51 (−46)
Average precipitation inches (mm)	0.51 (13)	0.44 (11)	0.77 (20)	1.8 (46)	2.92 (74)	2.77 (70)	1.54 (39)	1.10 (28)	1.18 (30)	1.32 (34)	0.59 (15)	0.53 (13)	15.47 (393)
Average snowfall inches (cm)	8.7 (22)	6.5 (17)	6.9 (18)	3.6 (9.1)	1.0 (2.5)	0.0 (0.0)	0.0 (0.0)	0.0 (0.0)	0.1 (0.25)	2.5 (6.4)	5.6 (14)	8.0 (20)	42.9 (109.25)
Average precipitation days (≥ 0.01 in)	5.1	4.5	6.2	8.6	9.9	10.9	7.3	5.4	5.6	5.9	4.5	4.3	78.2
Average snowy days (≥ 0.1 in)	4.3	3.4	3.3	1.8	0.6	0.0	0.0	0.0	0.0	1.0	2.7	3.5	20.6
Source 1: NOAA
Source 2: National Weather Service

== Demographics ==
Historical population
Census	Pop.	Note	%±
1920	477		—
1930	215		−54.9%
1940	203		−5.6%
1950	195		−3.9%
1960	266		36.4%
1970	227		−14.7%
1980	238		4.8%
1990	166		−30.3%
2000	136		−18.1%
2010	96		−29.4%
2020	126		31.3%
U.S. Decennial Census

=== 2010 census ===
As of the census of 2010, there were 96 people, 52 households, and 24 families residing in the town. The population density was 139.1 inhabitants per square mile (53.7/km^{2}). There were 75 housing units at an average density of 108.7 per square mile (42.0/km^{2}). The racial makeup of the town was 96.9% White, 2.1% African American, and 1.0% from two or more races. Hispanic or Latino of any race were 1.0% of the population.

There were 52 households, of which 19.2% had children under the age of 18 living with them; 40.4% were married couples living together, 3.8% had a female householder with no husband present, 1.9% had a male householder with no wife present, and 53.8% were non-families. 51.9% of all households were made up of individuals, and 28.8% had someone living alone who was 65 years of age or older. The average household size was 1.85 and the average family size was 2.79.

The median age in the town was 50 years. 20.8% of residents were under the age of 18; 3.3% were between the ages of 18 and 24; 17.7% were from 25 to 44; 33.2% were from 45 to 64; and 25% were 65 years of age or older. The gender makeup of the town was 46.9% male and 53.1% female.

=== 2000 census ===
As of the census of 2000, there were 136 people, 56 households, and 38 families residing in the town. The population density was 198.8 inhabitants per square mile (76.8/km^{2}). There were 87 housing units at an average density of 127.2 per square mile (49.1/km^{2}). The racial makeup of the town was 95.59% White, 0.74% Native American, 0.74% Asian, 1.47% from other races, and 1.47% from two or more races. Hispanic or Latino of any race were 1.47% of the population.

There were 56 households, out of which 28.6% had children under the age of 18 living with them, 53.6% were married couples living together, 10.7% had a female householder with no husband present, and 32.1% were non-families. 30.4% of all households were made up of individuals, and 16.1% had someone living alone who was 65 years of age or older. The average household size was 2.43 and the average family size was 3.03.

In the town, the population was spread out, with 25.7% under the age of 18, 6.6% from 18 to 24, 25.0% from 25 to 44, 27.2% from 45 to 64, and 15.4% who were 65 years of age or older. The median age was 41 years. For every 100 females there were 86.3 males. For every 100 females age 18 and over, there were 90.6 males.

The median income for a household in the town was $31,250, and the median income for a family was $33,438. Males had a median income of $36,250 versus $12,083 for females. The per capita income for the town was $15,027. There were no families and 5.8% of the population living below the poverty line, including no under eighteens and 10.7% of those over 64.

== Education ==
Melstone Public Schools educates students from kindergarten through 12th grade. Melstone High School's team name is the Broncs.

In 2006, Melstone made history by winning the State Boys Basketball Championship, being the smallest school ever to win. The Melstone Broncs defeated the defending state champion Gardiner Bruins in an overtime win.

== Media ==
The newspaper providing local news is the Roundup Record-Tribune. It is published weekly and serves Musselshell County and the neighboring counties.

== Notable residents ==
- Evelyn Genevieve Sharp, early American aviator
