= Peiffer Memorial Arboretum and Nature Preserve =

Nature preserve and memorial site in Cumberland County, Pennsylvania

Coordinates: 40°13′15″N 76°53′00″W

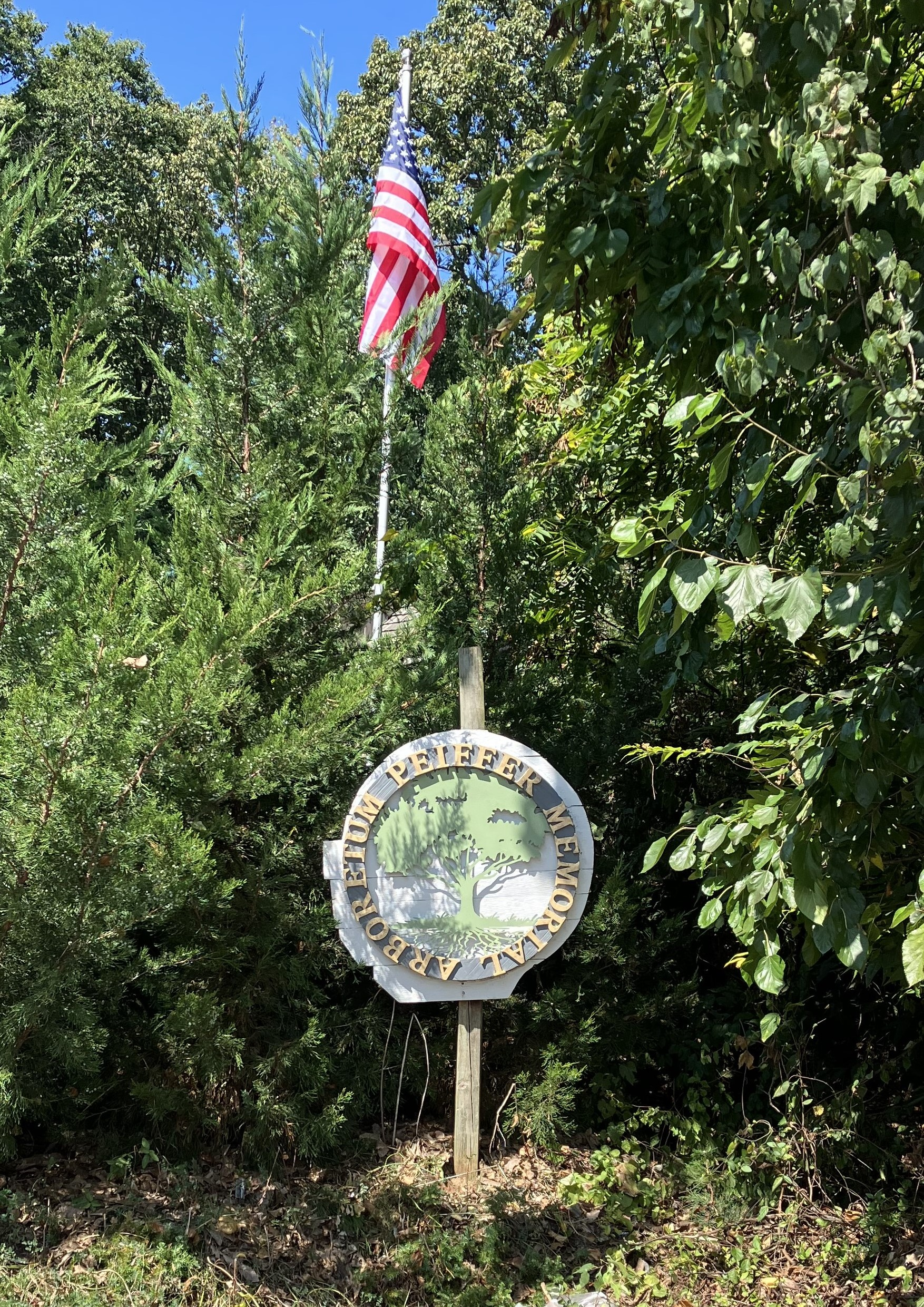
Entrance to the Peiffer Memorial Arboretum and Nature Preserve

The Peiffer Memorial Arboretum and Nature Preserve is a 35 acres (14 ha) nature preserve and memorial site in Cumberland County, Pennsylvania, U.S. The arboretum features woodlands, hiking trails, memorials to a World War II aviator who crashed on the site, and a Path of Leadership honoring past leaders of the local community.

The arboretum is located at 1841 Brookview Drive in New Cumberland. The property is bounded by the Yellow Breeches Creek to the south, Interstate 83 to the west, the Beacon Hill development to the east and Simson Ferry Road to the north. It is open to the public daily from dawn until dusk.

== Arboretum founding ==
The arboretum was founded by David H. Peiffer in July 2013. Peiffer was familiar with the property as he had grown up next to it and had attended nearby Cedar Cliff High School. His mother, Rosemarie Peiffer, was active in local politics. She served on the New Cumberland Borough Council and was the first woman to serve as a commissioner in Cumberland County.

The arboretum property was slated for development as part of the Foxlea housing project. Peiffer acquired the property in 2010 to preserve what remained of the old forest, wildlife, and streams. He initially intended to establish the non-profit arboretum to honor his mother and his father Howard, for their commitment to land preservation and agriculture. After acquiring the property, Peiffer learned of an airplane crash on the site in 1944 that killed Evelyn Sharp – a young aviator for the U.S. Army. He decided to also memorialize Sharp in the arboretum.

The arboretum was dedicated on August 5, 2018, officially honoring Rosemarie Peiffer and Evelyn Sharp.

== History of the land ==
In pre-colonial times, the area was home to the Shawnee people.

On March 4, 1681, King Charles II signed the Charter of Pennsylvania. The charter granted William Penn lands between the 39th and 42nd degrees of north latitude and from the Delaware River westward for five degrees of longitude, roughly the territory between Lord Baltimore's Province of Maryland and the Duke of York's Province of New York. The grant was largely given to pay off a £16,000 debt owed to Penn, money which his late father Admiral Sir Penn had lent the king.

Named for Cumberland, England, Cumberland County was officially founded on January 27, 1750.

By 1764, the property was part of the Manor of Lowther, which was a 7551-acre area of land that was bound on the north by the Conodoguinet Creek, on the east by the Susquehanna River and to the south by the Yellow Breeches Creek.

In 1774, the property became part of the William Black Homestead, a 267-acre tract.

On April 3, 1944, a Lockheed P-38 Lightning military aircraft crashed on the site (see: Airplane crash section below).

By the late 1950s, the site was part of Drexel Hills, New Cumberland and the adjacent John Fox Estate/Foxlea farm in Lower Allen Township. In the late 1960s the site was threatened with residential development.

In the 1970s, developer Sidney Cohen obtained a sales agreement to purchase and develop parts of the William Black Homestead, adjacent to the arboretum site. Cohen's plan was criticized by local residents who would be impacted by the development, including Peiffer's parents. Cohen eventually went bankrupt.

Parcels of the land were later developed in the 1990s and 2000s by various builders featuring townhouses and single family homes.

In 2010, Peiffer purchased the last undeveloped acreage of the former William Black Homestead to establish the arboretum.

== Path of Leadership award ==
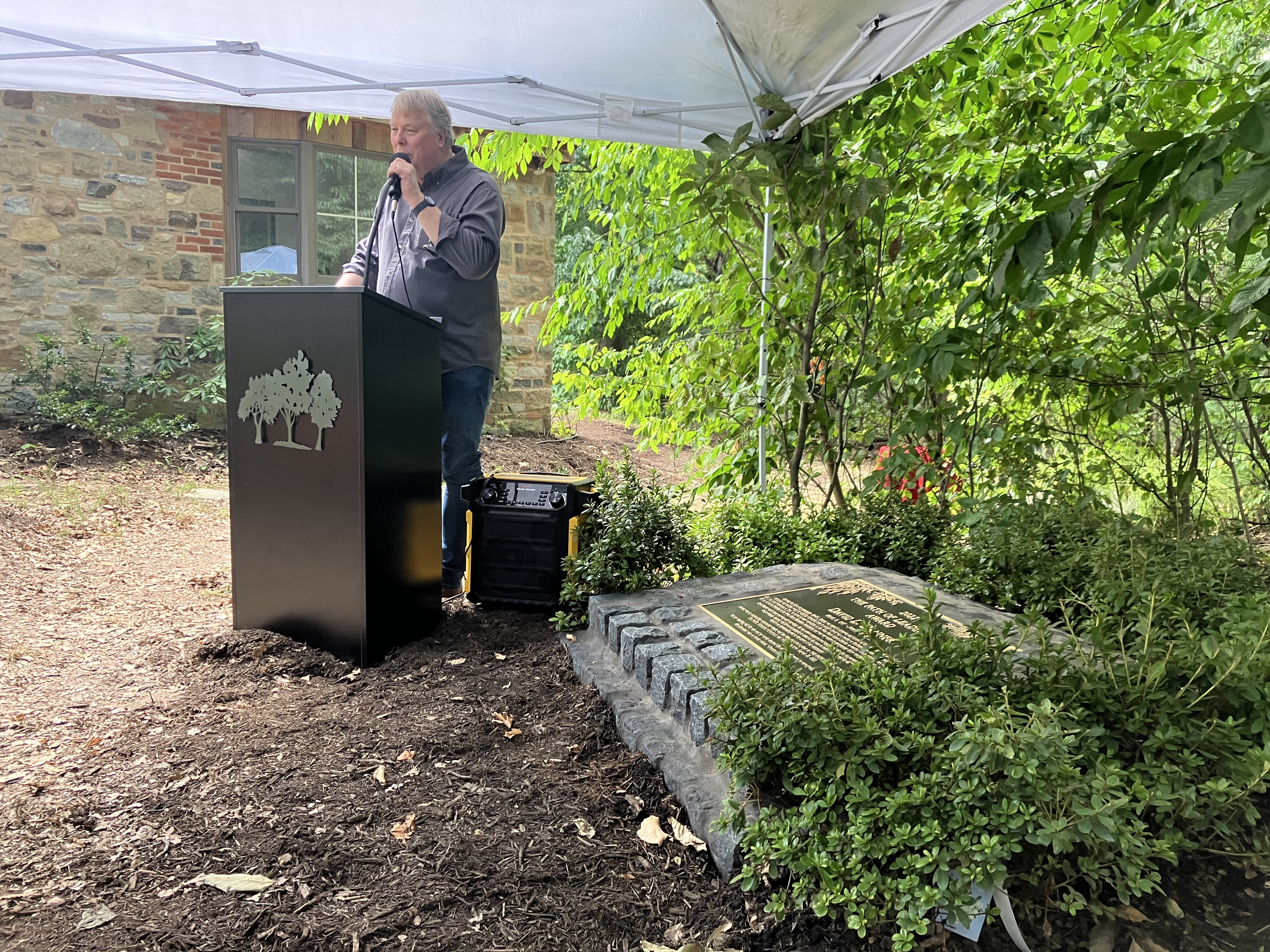
Induction of David L. Danner on the Path of Leadership, August 28, 2022

Not long after dedication, in 2019, the arboretum established a Path of Leadership award to posthumously recognize contributions made by leaders of the local community (particularly in Cumberland County) to improve the lives of others in their community. Honorees are typically inducted in August of each year, and are memorialized with a plaque set in small granite square stones around a path to the north side of the main house. Each marker is included in the Historical Marker Database.

Persons honored (with link to plaque photo and inscription) include:

| Year | Honoree | Description |
|---|---|---|
| 2019 | Jon E. Lafavaer' | Lifelong resident of New Cumberland and president of the West Shore School Board in the 1970–80s |
| 2020 | Dr. Gerald S. Brinton | Longtime resident of New Cumberland, very involved with the Cumberland County Historical Society and was a nationally known expert on the Civil War |
| 2021 | Mary L. Landis' | Longtime resident of New Cumberland who served on Borough Council for over 30 years and was vice president |
| 2022 | David L. Danner' | Raised in Lemoyne and served in many capacities in the West Shore School District, including teacher, coach, principal, and student adviser |
| 2023 | John (Jack) R. Murray' | Public servant and community leader who served as Council President in the Borough of New Cumberland for 44 years |
| 2024 | Dorothy "DJ" Landis' | Teacher in the West Shore School District for thirty-two-years, and former New Cumberland Borough Council member and mayor |
| 2025 | Maxine Bixler' | Longtime volunteer and librarian in New Cumberland who devoted her life in service to others |
| 2026 | None | |

== Replica of the 1683 Caleb Pusey House ==
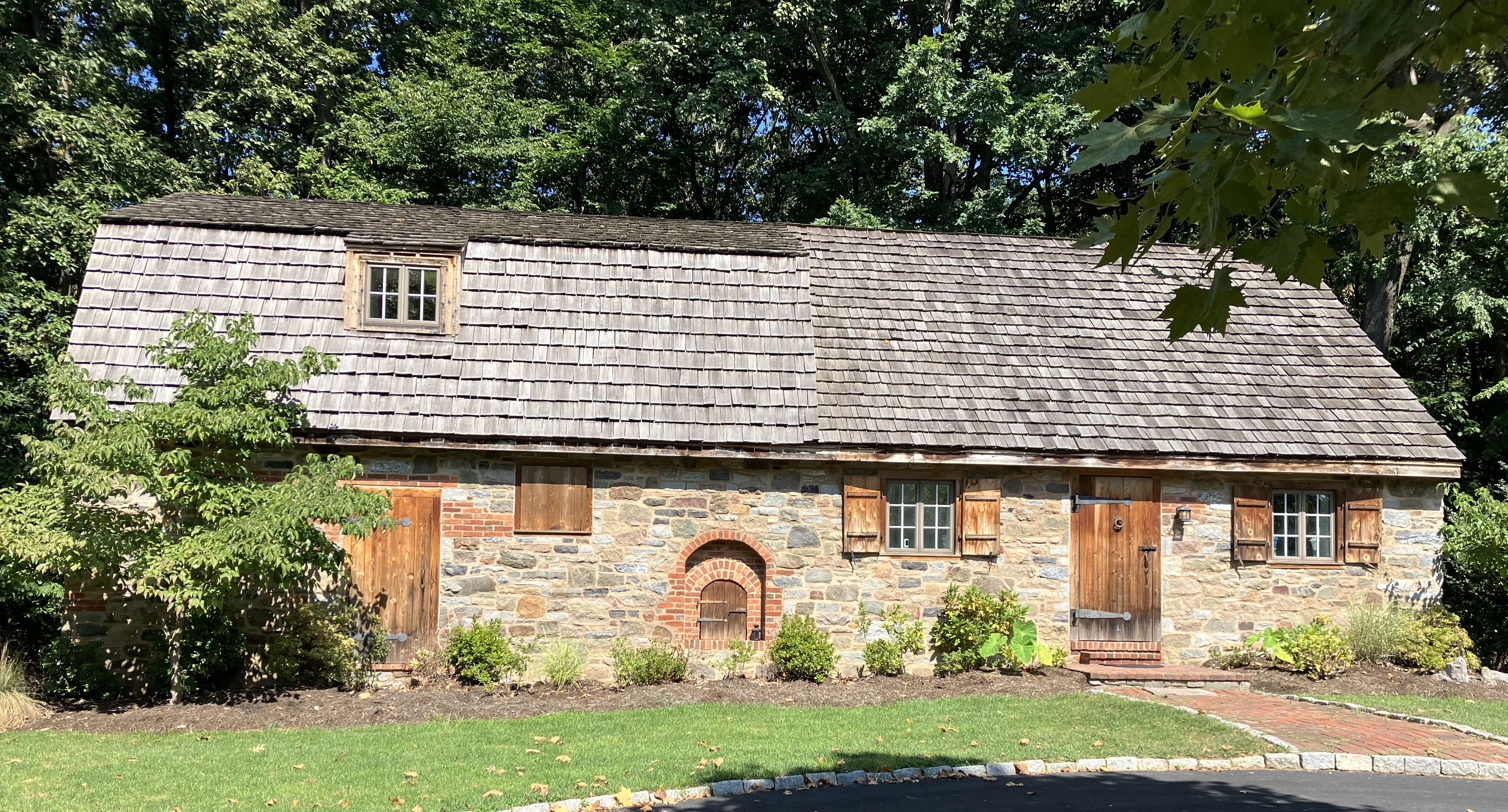
The Welcome Center - designed after the historic Caleb Pusey House

The Welcome Center is designed after the historic Caleb Pusey House built in 1683 in Upland, Pennsylvania. The Caleb Pusey House is the oldest English-built house in Pennsylvania. It is the only remaining house that William Penn, the founder of Pennsylvania, is known to have visited. Pusey was a friend and business partner of Penn's.

== Airplane crash ==
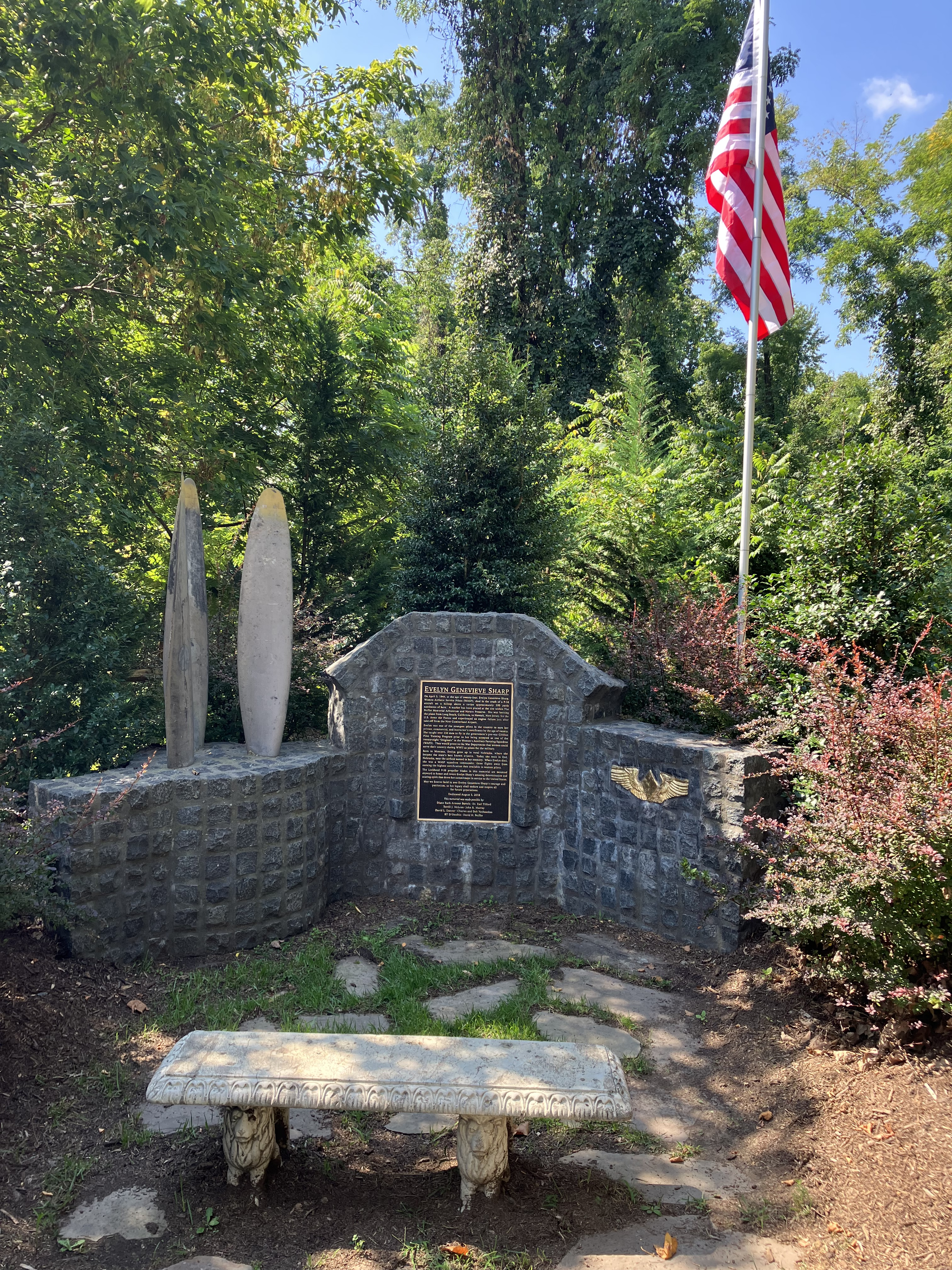
Memorial to Evelyn Sharp at the Arboretum entrance

On April 3, 1944, a Lockheed P-38 Lightning crashed on the site. The twin-engine aircraft was on a ferry flight from Long Beach, California, to Newark, New Jersey, and had made several stopovers along the way. On the last leg to Newark, the 24-year-old pilot – Evelyn Genevieve "Sharpie" Sharp – took off from New Cumberland Airport (now Capital City Airport/CXY). The aircraft experienced an engine failure on takeoff and Sharp attempted to land on what was then an open field – now a forested area atop the hiking trail on the northwest side of the Arboretum. The P-38 made a "pancake" landing that thrust the landing gear into the cockpit, killing Sharp instantly.

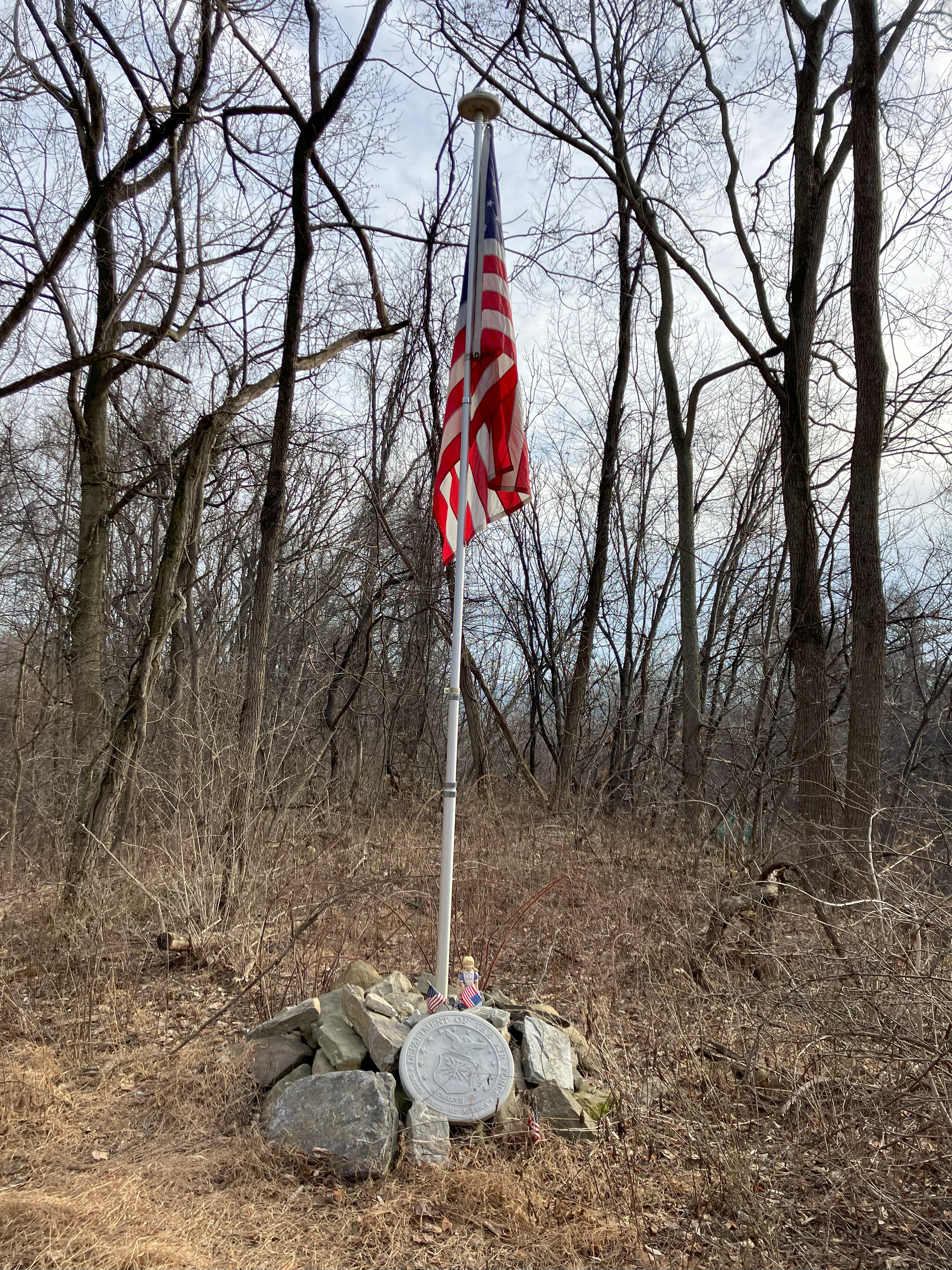
Memorial to Evelyn Sharp at the approximate site of the plane crash

Sharp was one of the original Women's Auxiliary Ferrying Squadron (WAFS) pilots, with over 3,000 flight hours logged when she joined. The WAFS were soon merged with the Women's Flying Training Detachment to form the Women Airforce Service Pilots (WASPs). Sharp was the only WASP to die in a P-38 accident.

The arboretum contains two memorials to Sharp – one at the front entrance, which includes original P-38 propeller blades (although not from the accident aircraft), and another atop the west-side hiking trail at the approximate site of the crash, marked by a pile of field stones and an American flag. Woodlands have since replaced the open field that existed at the time of the crash.

== Howard and Rosemarie Peiffer grave sites ==
Peiffer's parents – Howard R. Peiffer (1931–2004) and Rosemarie C. Peiffer (1936–2013) – are buried at the arboretum. Their grave sites are located just to the north of the Welcome Center house and are on a ridge overlooking the stream and woodlands below.

== William Black Spring House ==
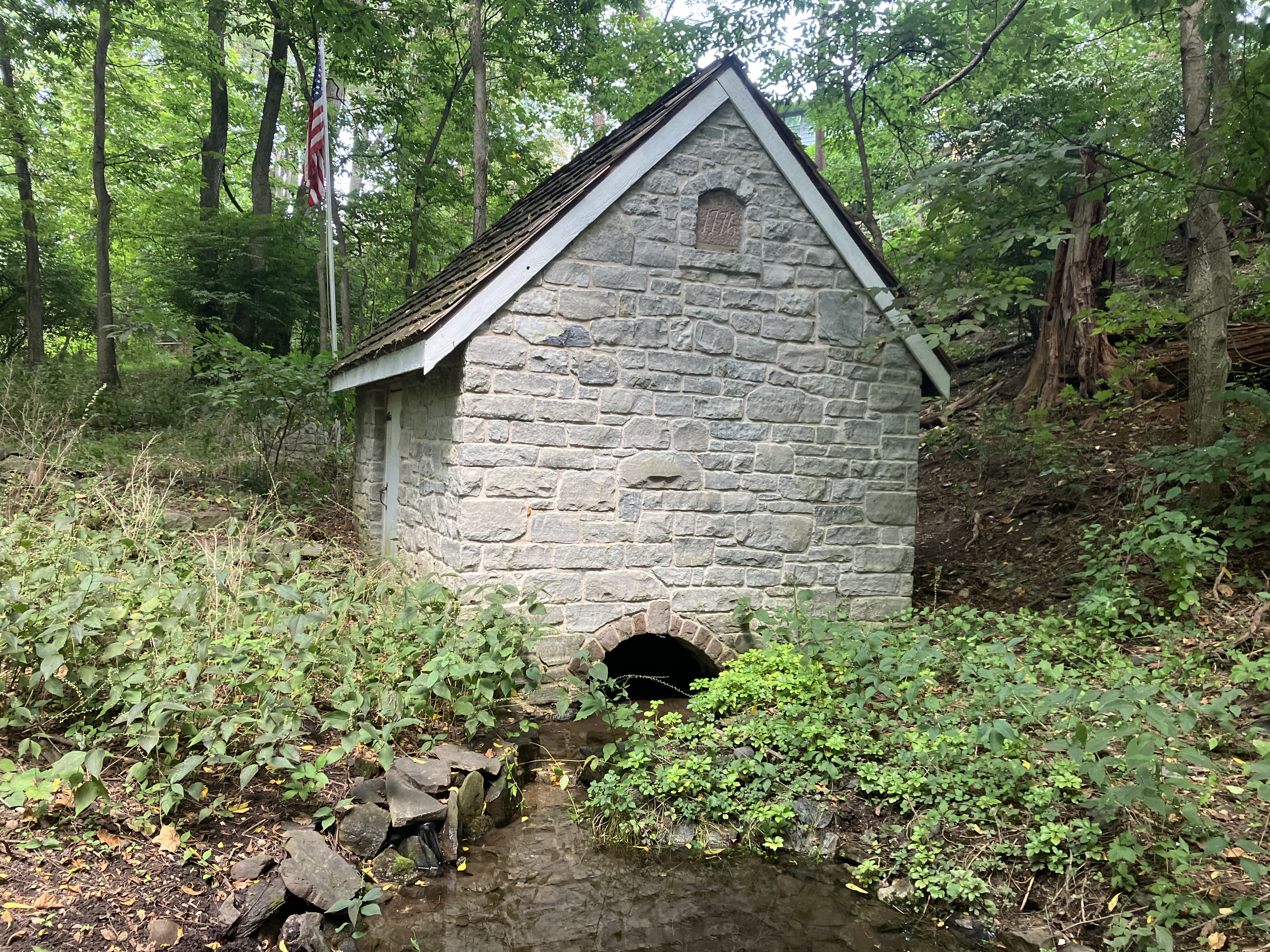
The reconstructed William Black Spring House

The arboretum contains a reconstruction of a spring house that was originally part of the William Black estate, built circa 1776. The spring house was used for cold storage in the 18th and 19th centuries, as the spring below it seeped water at a relatively cool temperature year-round. In 2013, Peiffer began a restoration, and the reconstructed spring house was dedicated on August 16, 2014.
