= Beverly Wilshire Hotel =

- U.S. National Register of Historic Places
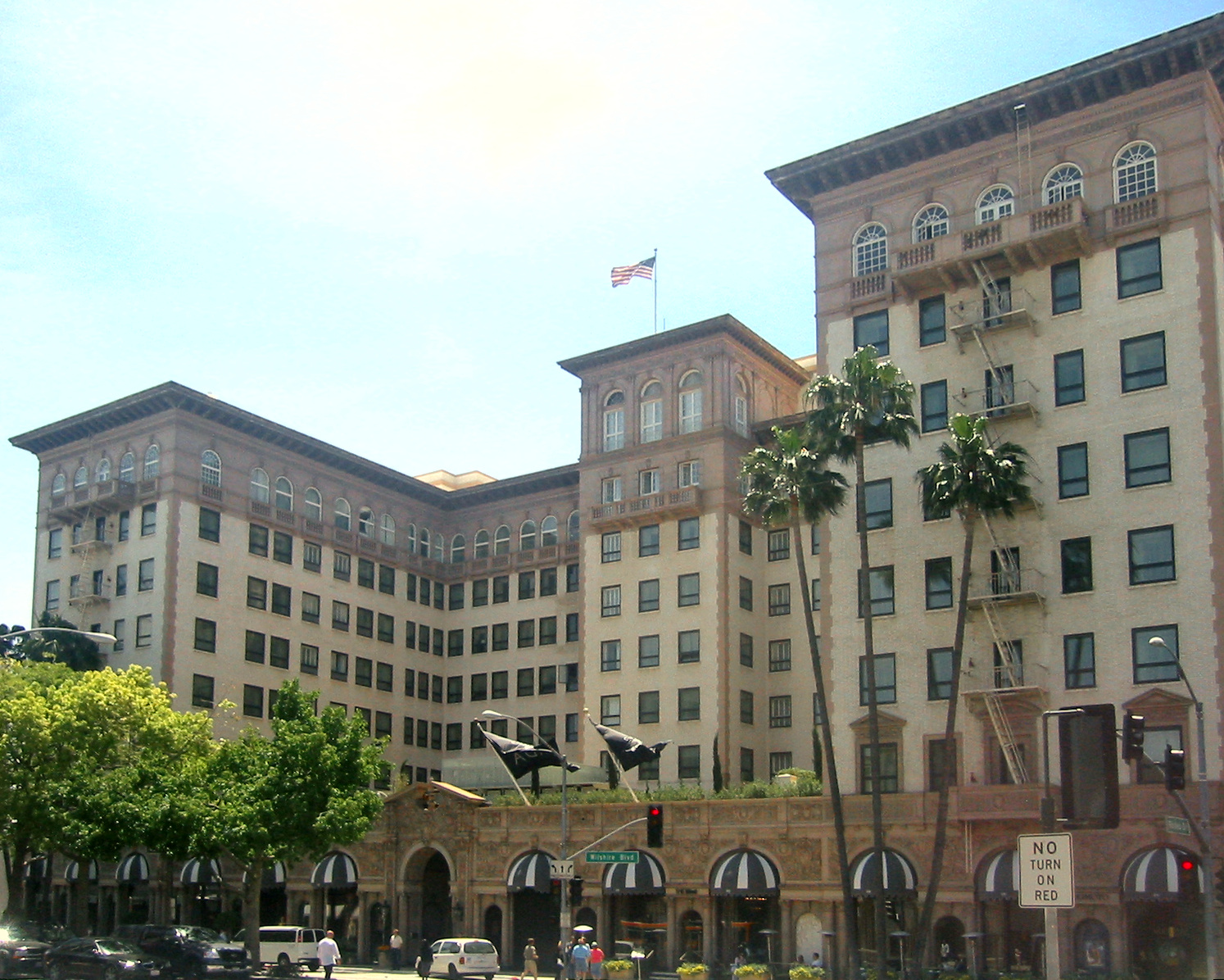
- The Beverly Wilshire Hotel in 2007

- Location within the Los Angeles metropolitan area Location within the United States
- Location: Beverly Hills, California, USA
- Coordinates: 34°4′1″N 118°24′3″W
- Built: 1928
- Architect: Walker & Eisen
- NRHP reference No.: 87000908
- Added to NRHP: June 12, 1987

The Beverly Wilshire, A Four Seasons Hotel, commonly known as the Beverly Wilshire Hotel, is a historic, luxury hotel in Beverly Hills, California, located at the intersection of Wilshire Boulevard and Rodeo Drive. It was completed in 1928 and has been used as a shooting location for films and television series.

== History ==
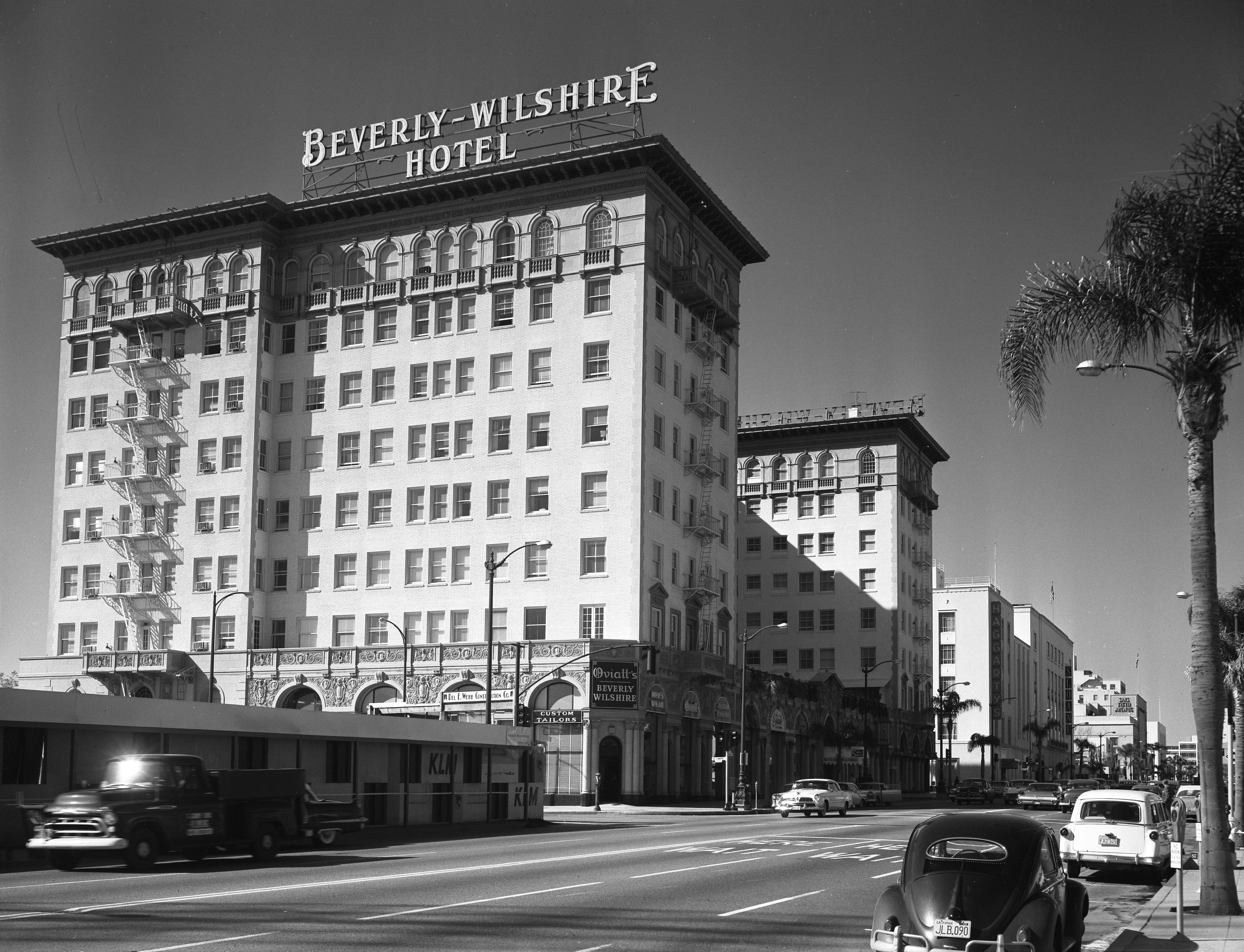
The Beverly Wilshire Hotel in 1959

The Beverly-Wilshire Apartment Hotel opened on January 1, 1928. It was constructed by real estate developer Walter G. McCarty on the site of the former Beverly Hills Speedway. At the time, the city had fewer than 18,000 residents. The E-shaped structure was built of Tuscan stone and Carrara marble in the Italian Renaissance style. It was soon after renamed The Beverly Wilshire Hotel.

McCarty sold the hotel on November 1, 1944 for $2.25 million to Arnold Kirkeby, who made it part of his Kirkeby Hotels chain. Between 1946 and 1957, the hotel was renovated in stages, to designs by noted African American architect Paul Revere Williams. A ballroom was added to accommodate the popular big bands of the day. An Olympic-sized swimming pool was built and championship tennis courts were added, with tennis champion Pancho Gonzalez as tennis director.

Kirkeby sold the hotel in 1955 to Evelyn Sharp. She sold the hotel in 1961 to William Zeckendorf's Webb and Knapp firm, along with the Gotham Hotel and the Stanhope Hotel in New York for $25 million. Later that same year, the hotel was sold again to a group of investors headed by Hernando Courtright, a Zeckendorf executive who had been in charge of the redevelopment of the Twentieth Century-Fox backlot as Century City. The hotel was rebranded as Hernando Courtright's Beverly Wilshire Hotel. Courtright added a new tower wing in 1971, on the site of the old swimming pool, doubling the size of the hotel.

In 1985, just months before his death, Courtright sold the hotel for $125 million to Hong Kong-based Regent International Hotels, which renamed it The Regent Beverly Wilshire. In 1986, Regent International Hotels was bought by EIE, part of the business empire of flamboyant Japanese billionaire developer Harunori Takahashi. Regent gutted and renovated the historic Wilshire Wing in 1988 at a cost of $100 million, to designs by Gruen Associates. The newer Beverly Wing in the rear was renovated in 1989 for a further $60 million. In 1992, EIE sold Regent International Hotels to Four Seasons Hotels and Resorts and the hotel was renamed The Regent Beverly Wilshire, a Four Seasons Hotel, though its ownership remained with EIE subsidiary Hotel Investment Corp.

In February 1996, Hotel Investment Corp sold the hotel for $100 million to BW Hotel LLC, a Hong Hong consortium of eight companies, led by Lai Sun. In 2006, the hotel was again renamed following a renovation, dropping the Regent affiliation and becoming Beverly Wilshire, A Four Seasons Hotel. In January 2025, Four Seasons and BW Hotel LLC, owner of Beverly Wilshire, jointly announced that Four Seasons would conclude management of the hotel at the end of the term of its management agreement in December 2028, after which date the hotel will operate independently as The Beverly Wilshire.

== Notable guests and events ==
On Saturday, October 9, 1937, F. Scott Fitzgerald lunched at the Beverly Wilshire with Ginevra King whom he'd known from his youth and who is believed to have been a model for Daisy Buchanan, a character from his novel The Great Gatsby.

In July 1940, the Beverly Wilshire agreed to accommodate Paul Robeson at the then "exorbitant" rate of $100 per night and only if he would register under an assumed name. Robeson was about to perform at the Hollywood Bowl accompanied by the Los Angeles Philharmonic Orchestra. He accepted the hotel's terms but then "defiantly" spent every afternoon sitting in the lobby, where he was widely recognized. Los Angeles hotels lifted their restrictions on black guests soon after.

On November 18, 1966, Sandy Koufax, star pitcher for the Los Angeles Dodgers, announced his sudden retirement from baseball at the age of 30 due to his ailing arm in a press conference at the Beverly Wilshire.

Elvis Presley and later Warren Beatty spent a number of years in the hotel. It was the home of John Lennon, when he was separated for several months from his wife Yoko Ono.

The American socialite and heiress Barbara Hutton lived her last years in the hotel and died there in May 1979.

In 1990, the Beverly Wilshire was the primary setting for the movie Pretty Woman, though most interior scenes were shot at the defunct Ambassador Hotel nearby. Clueless, Escape from the Planet of the Apes, and HBO's Entourage television series were also filmed at the hotel. Beyoncé filmed her music video for "7/11" inside the hotel's Beverly Presidential Suite in 2014.

Scottish author Andrew O'Hagan related, in the London Review of Books, that he was once seated next to then 73-years old Joan Didion in some event at a "weird Italian-Japanese restaurant," when she beckoned him closer. "Hoping," he wrote, "for a deathless secret of the sort once whispered to her by Ernest Hemingway or Greta Garbo," he heard Didion say emphatically, "Whenever you're in Los Angeles, you must always stay at the Beverly Wilshire." And that was it.
