= Franklin County Regional Airport =

- IATA: none; ICAO: none; FAA LID: N68

Summary
- Airport type: Public
- Owner: Susquehanna Area Regional Airport Authority
- Location: Chambersburg, Pennsylvania
- Elevation AMSL: 697 ft / 212.4 m
- Coordinates: 39°58′19.6″N 77°38′35.7″W
- Interactive map of Franklin County Regional Airport

Runways
Direction	Length		Surface
Direction	ft	m	Surface
6/24	3,300	1,006	Asphalt

Statistics (2015)
- Aircraft operations: 11,910
- Based aircraft: 16
- Source: AOPA

Franklin County Regional Airport (FAA LID: N68), formerly known as Chambersburg Municipal Airport, is a general aviation airport located three miles (5 km) north of the Borough of Chambersburg, in Franklin County, Pennsylvania, USA. The airport is situated approximately 45 miles southwest of Harrisburg.

In 2004, the Susquehanna Area Regional Airport Authority (SARAA) bought Franklin County Regional Airport and formed a Study Advisory Group (SAG) to develop a list of recommended improvements at the airport. Those improvements included: rehabilitation of the runway, taxiway, ramp area and other landside faculties, additional parking, signage, hangars, an automated weather observation station (AWOS) and a fueling service. The improvements will be made on a priority basis and as grant monies become available.

== History ==
Franklin County Regional Airport was opened in July 1970.

In 2014, the Federal Aviation Administration (FAA) awarded Franklin County Regional Airport a $720,000 grant to construct a parallel taxiway to runway 6/24, which will eliminate the need for aircraft to turn around at the end of the runway and taxi back down the runway to the main taxiway. The parallel taxiway will be approximately 700 feet long, and will terminate at an intersection with the main taxiway that's used to get to and from the aircraft apron.

== Facilities ==
Franklin County Regional Airport has one runway:

- Runway 8/26: 3,300 x 75 ft. (1,006 x 23 m), Surface: Asphalt

== Statistics ==
There are 16 aircraft based at Franklin County Regional Airport (15 single engine aircraft & 1 multi engine aircraft). In 2015, there were a total of 11,910 aircraft movements at the airport.

== See also ==
- List of airports in Pennsylvania
