= Evelyn Sharp (businesswoman) =

American businesswoman

- Born: Manhattan, New York, U.S.
- Died: April 16, 1997; Manhattan, New York, U.S.
- Education: Columbia University
- Occupations: Businesswoman; art collector
- Known for: Owner of the Beverly Wilshire and Stanhope Hotels
- Children: Peter Jay Sharp; Mary Sharp Cronson

Evelyn Sharp (died April 16, 1997) was an American hotelier, philanthropist, and art collector. She was the owner of the Beverly Wilshire and Stanhope hotels.

== Biography ==
Sharp was a native of Manhattan and attended Columbia University School of Journalism, where she married her husband, real estate investor Jesse Sharp, who built a number of hotels including the Stanhope Hotel, located opposite the Metropolitan Museum of Art.

After her husband died in 1941, Sharp, who was then an interior decorator, took over the business and enriched the family real estate portfolio with her own. She sold 14 properties owned by her husband and added the Gotham Hotel, the Saranac Inn, and the Beverly Wilshire Hotel. Her portfolio also included Delmonico's, the Ritz Tower, The Carlyle, the Beaux Arts Apartments and the Paramount Building in Manhattan, and the St. Francis Hotel in San Francisco.

She eventually sold most of her holdings and devoted her time to charities in New York and Los Angeles and to her art collection, which went on display at the Solomon R. Guggenheim Museum in 1978. She and her son also donated the Sharp Gallery at the Metropolitan Museum of Art.

In 1952, Sharp endowed the Evelyn Sharp Foundation to support the performing and fine arts, museum arts, and arts education in New York City. She also endowed a graduate fellowship at Caltech and served as a trustee. She was also a founder of the Los Angeles Music Center, a trustee of the Menninger Foundation, a past chairwoman of the Martha Graham Dance Company, and La Maison Française at New York University.

== Personal life and family ==
Sharp had two children: Peter Jay Sharp, and Mary Sharp Cronson. A past member of the Forbes 400, Peter Jay Sharp was in charge of the Carlyle Hotel and developed 450 Park Avenue and was the namesake of several Peter Jay Sharp Theaters in New York City. He was also a past chairman of New York City Opera and was designated chairman of the Juilliard School before his death in 1992. Sharp's daughter, Mary S. Cronson, was a past trustee of the Solomon R. Guggenheim Museum and helped found the Works & Process performing arts series at the Guggenheim. Her grandson, Paul Cronson is also a trustee of the Guggenheim.

Sharp died on April 13, 1997, at Lenox Hill Hospital. She was a resident of the Gotham Hotel and the Carlyle Hotel.
