= Evelyn Sharp (aviator) =

American aviator

Evelyn Genevieve Sharp
- Evelyn Sharp sitting on a Vultee basic trainer plane on 7 March 1943
- Born: Lois Genevieve Crouse; October 1, 1919; Melstone, Montana, U.S.
- Died: April 3, 1944 (aged 24); Cumberland County, Pennsylvania, U.S.
- Cause of death: Plane crash
- Occupation: Aviator
- Parent(s): John and Mary Sharp

Evelyn Genevieve "Sharpie" Sharp (October 1, 1919 – April 3, 1944) was an American aviator. She was a member of the Women Airforce Service Pilots (WASP). Sharp died at age 24, when the plane she was flying lost an engine during takeoff.

== Early life ==
Sharp was born Lois Genevieve Crouse on October 1, 1919, in Melstone, Montana, to Elsie Adelie Haeske Crouse and Orla Crouse. She was adopted by John and Mary Sharp two months later, on December 22, 1919, and her name was changed to Evelyn Genevieve Sharp.

The Sharps moved to Ord, Nebraska, in 1924 and opened a grocery store. In 1928, Orla Sharp purchased a ranch and tried ranching for a time, but within a year sold the ranch and returned to Ord, where he opened a cafe and offered rooms to let.

== Introduction to aviation ==
In 1935, when Sharp was sixteen, Jack Jefford opened a flying school in Ord and rented a room from the Sharps. Unable to pay his rent at one point, he offered to teach Sharp how to fly instead. After 25 lessons over the course of 13 months, she flew solo in an Aeronca C-3 on March 4, 1936.

At age eighteen, she received her commercial pilot's license and acquired her first airplane with the help of local businessmen. Sharp repaid them with money she earned from barnstorming. She became an airplane instructor at age 20. Over 350 men learned to fly under her instruction.

While not the first American female airmail pilot (Katherine Stinson), she was certainly among the first.

== World War II ==
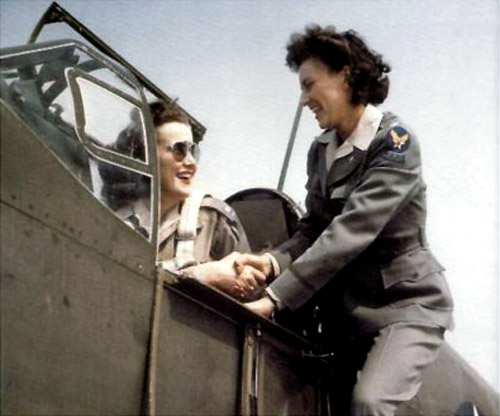
L-R, WAFS Barbara London prepares to take off in the P-51 Mustang, Evelyn Sharp wears the gabardine WAFS uniform. The WAFS were disappointed when they had to exchange their uniform for the Santiago Blues worn by the WASPs.

Sharp was one of the original Women's Auxiliary Ferrying Squadron (WAFS) pilots, with over 3,000 flight hours logged when she joined. The WAFS (under Nancy Love) were soon merged with the Women's Flying Training Detachment (under Jacqueline Cochran) to form the Women Airforce Service Pilots (WASP).

Sharp died on April 3, 1944, in Cumberland County, Pennsylvania, when the P-38 Lightning she was ferrying lost an engine on takeoff from New Cumberland Airport and crashed. She was 24 years old.

== Legacy ==
At the time of her death she was a squadron commander, only three flights from her fifth rating, the highest certificate then available to women.

She is buried in Ord, Nebraska, where a public airfield, the Evelyn Sharp Field Airport, has been named for her. Every June, Ord celebrates Evelyn Sharp Days in her honor.

In 1992, Sharp was inducted into the Nebraska Aviation Hall of Fame.

In 2018, a memorial to Sharp was dedicated at the Peiffer Memorial Arboretum and Nature Preserve in Cumberland County, Pennsylvania, at the site of the plane crash.

On August 26-27, 2023, a pair of Sharp's earrings in the shape of tiny P-38 aircraft were worn at the Guardians of Freedom Air Show in Lincoln, Nebraska, by Air Force Capt. Aimee “Rebel” Fiedler — an F-16C fighter pilot with the Viper Team.

== See also ==
- Women Airforce Service Pilots (WASP)
- United States Army Air Forces
