= 1501 Broadway =

Office skyscraper in Manhattan, New York

- Paramount Building
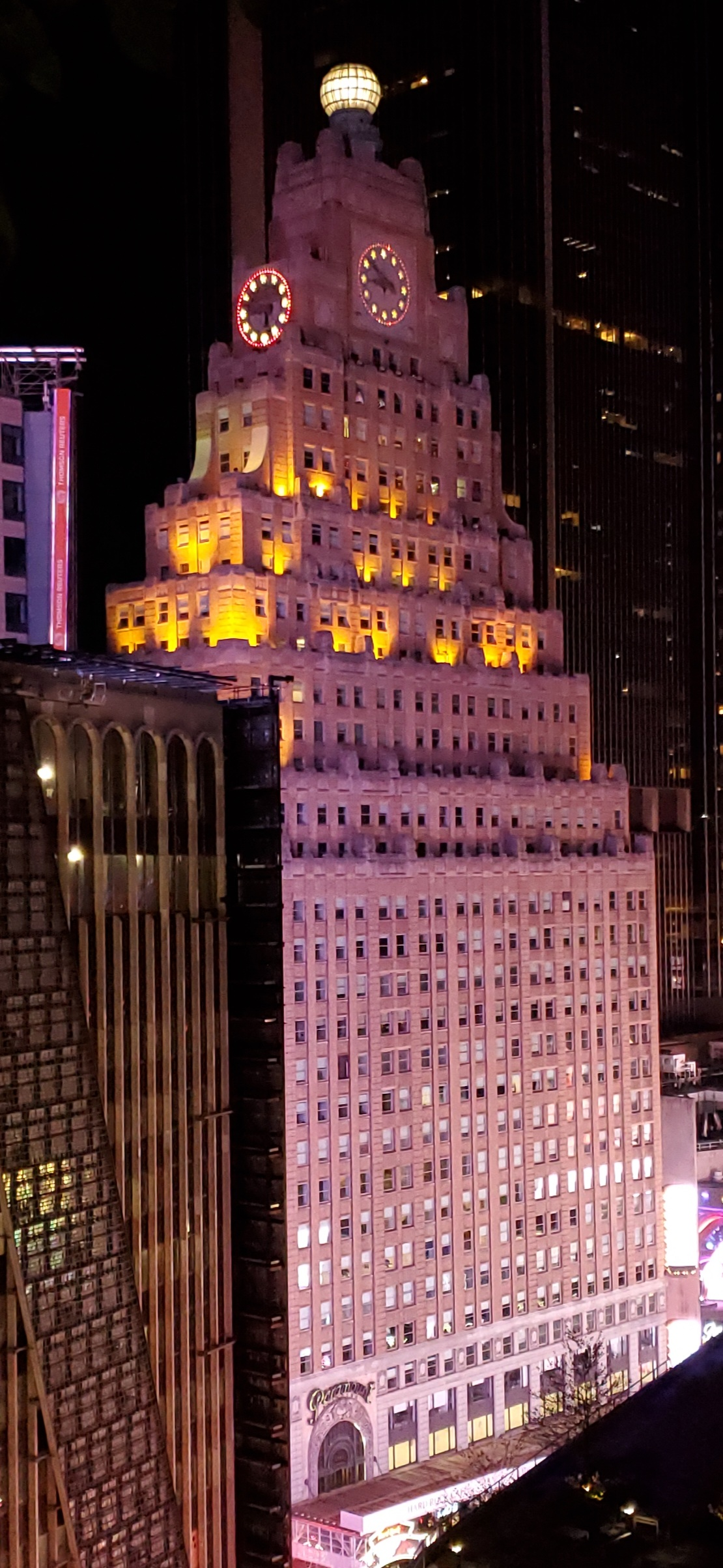
- Seen from Broadway and 42nd Street
- Etymology: Paramount Pictures

General information
- Type: Office
- Architectural style: Beaux-Arts; Art deco
- Location: Times Square, 1501 Broadway, Manhattan, New York, United States
- Coordinates: 40°45′26″N 73°59′11″W
- Current tenants: Multiple including Hard Rock Café
- Named for: Paramount Pictures
- Groundbreaking: 1926
- Topped-out: August 2, 1926
- Completed: 1927
- Cost: $13.5 million
- Client: Paramount Pictures
- Owner: Paramount Leasehold

Height
- Architectural: 455 ft (139 m)
- Antenna spire: 431 ft (131 m)
- Roof: 391 ft (119 m)
- Top floor: 330 ft (100 m)

Technical details
- Material: Steel
- Floor count: 33
- Floor area: 686,603 ft^{2} (63,787.5 m^{2})
- Lifts/elevators: 22
- Grounds: 41,586 ft^{2} (3,863.5 m^{2})

Design and construction
- Architects: C.W. and George L. Rapp
- Architecture firm: Rapp and Rapp
- Developer: Famous Players–Lasky
- Engineer: R. E. Hall & Co.
- Main contractor: Thompson-Starrett Company

New York City Landmark
- Official name: Paramount Building
- Designated: November 1, 1988
- Reference no.: 1566

1501 Broadway, also known as the Paramount Building, is a 33-story office building on Times Square between West 43rd and 44th Streets in the Theater District neighborhood of Manhattan in New York City. Designed by Rapp and Rapp, it was erected from 1925 to 1927 as the headquarters of Paramount Pictures. The building is designed in the Art Deco and Beaux-Arts styles. The office wing on Times Square contains numerous setbacks as mandated by the 1916 Zoning Resolution, while the rear wing housed the Paramount Theatre from 1926 to 1967.

The facade is mostly designed with brick walls, though the first five stories are ornamented with limestone piers. The main entrance is on 43rd Street. There is also a five-story arch on Broadway, facing Times Square, which leads to a Hard Rock Cafe; it is an imitation of the former Paramount Theatre entrance. Atop the building is a four-faced clock, with two large faces and two small faces, as well as an illuminated globe that could display the time. The ground floor historically had an ornate lobby leading to the theater, which had 3,664 seats over four levels. The modern building contains office space in both the original office wing and the theater wing.

Paramount predecessor Famous Players–Lasky proposed the theater in 1922, but Rapp and Rapp had revised the plans to include an office tower by 1924. The theater opened on November 19, 1926, though the offices did not open until the following year. The clock and globe on the roof were blacked out during World War II. A group led by David Rosenthal converted the theater to offices in 1967 and removed the grand arch on the facade, which was part of the theater's original entrance. The Paramount Building's facade became a New York City designated landmark in 1988. The arch, clock, and globe were restored starting in the late 1990s, and the main entrance was relocated in another renovation in the 2010s.

== Site ==
The Paramount Building is at 1501 Broadway, between 43rd and 44th Streets, at Times Square in the Midtown Manhattan neighborhood of New York City, New York, U.S. While the building carries a Broadway address, it is actually on the west side of Seventh Avenue. The section of Broadway and Seventh Avenue between 43rd and 45th Streets is officially listed on city maps as "Times Square", (Note: As the two roads intersect at a very shallow angle, they are nearly parallel through Times Square. Broadway is west of Seventh Avenue to the north of 45th Street and east of Seventh Avenue to the south of 44th Street. Because Broadway between 42nd and 47th Streets was closed in the 2010s, the Paramount Building only faces Seventh Avenue.) but the adjoining section of Broadway was converted into a permanent pedestrian plaza in the 2010s. The Paramount Building's rectangular land lot covers 41,586 square feet (3,863.5 m^{2}), with a frontage of 200 feet (61 m) on Broadway and 207 feet (63 m) on 43rd and 44th Streets.

The surrounding area is part of Manhattan's Theater District and contains many Broadway theatres. 1501 Broadway shares the block with 229 West 43rd Street, the Hayes Theater, and the St. James Theatre to the west. Other nearby buildings include the Majestic Theatre, the Broadhurst Theatre, and the Shubert Theatre to the northwest; One Astor Plaza to the north; 1530 Broadway to the northeast; 1500 Broadway to the east; 4 Times Square and One Times Square to the southeast; 3 Times Square to the south; the American Airlines Theatre, Lyric Theatre, and New Victory Theater to the southwest.

Prior to the development of the Paramount Building, the eastern portion of the site had been occupied by the Putnam Building, a six-story commercial structure. It was named after American Revolutionary War general Israel Putnam, who had passed through the site in 1776 during the war. The Putnam Building had long been occupied by theatrical agencies and, before its demolition in 1925, had a large electric sign measuring 200 by 50 feet (61 by 15 m) on its facade. The western part of the site was occupied by a group of brownstones, operated by the Astor family as a set of apartments called Westover Court. The Astor family had owned the land since 1803. Until about 1850, the vicinity had also been known as the "Eden Farm" a title that came from a previous landowner.

== Architecture ==
1501 Broadway was designed by brothers Cornelius Ward Rapp and George Leslie Rapp, of the firm Rapp and Rapp, in the Beaux-Arts and Art Deco styles. It was constructed from 1925 to 1927 as the headquarters of Paramount Pictures, one of the major American motion picture companies in the 1920s. R. E. Hall & Co. were the construction engineers, and Thompson–Starrett Co. was the general contractor; numerous other engineers, contractors, and suppliers were involved in the building's construction. 1501 Broadway contains 33 stories, although early reports cite the structure as containing 35 stories. It measures 372 feet (113 m) tall to its roof and 455 feet (139 m) to its pinnacle. At the time of its completion, the Paramount Building was the tallest building in Times Square, as well as Broadway's tallest building north of the Woolworth Building.

=== Form ===
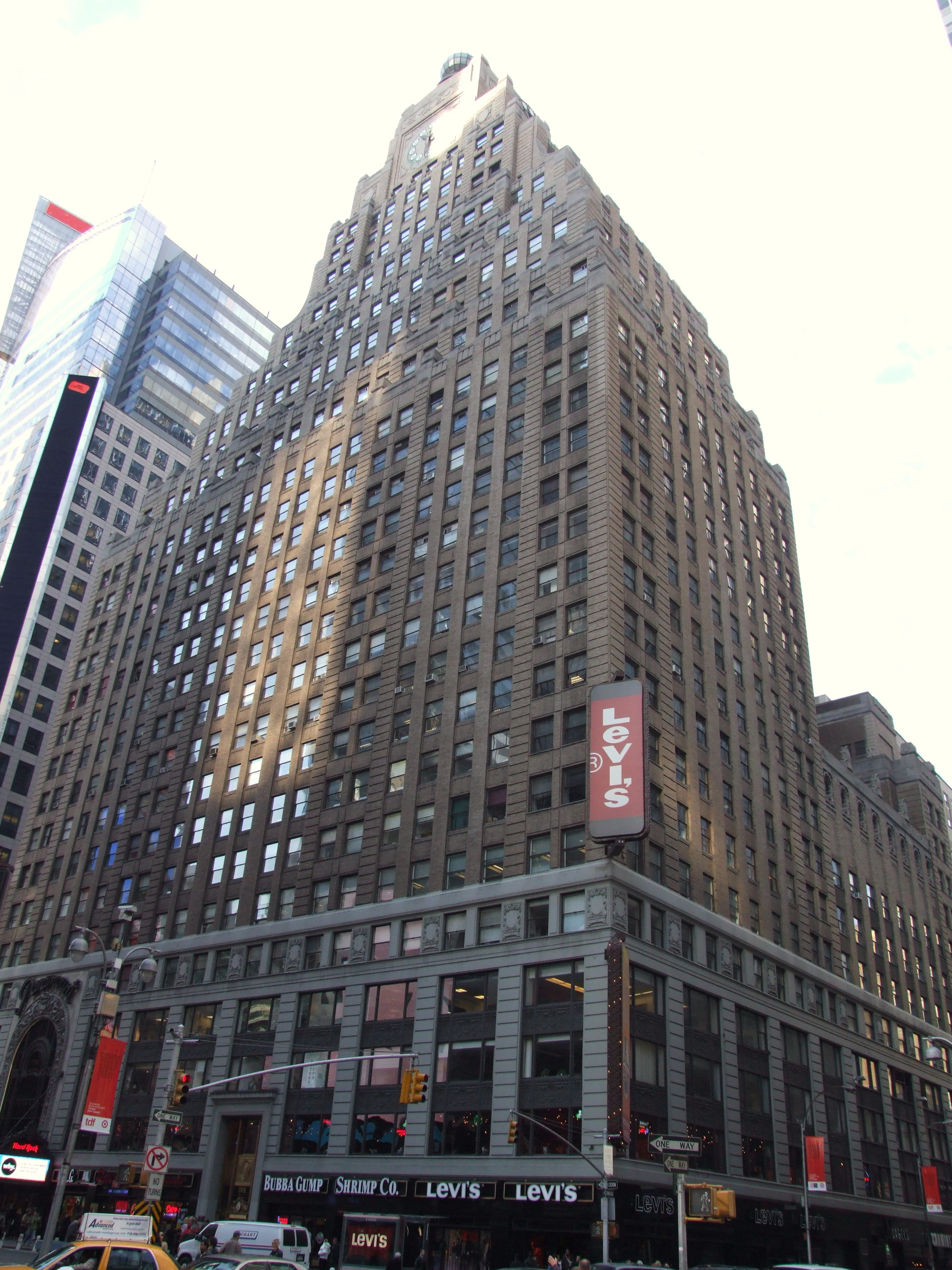
Seen from 44th Street

1501 Broadway was designed in two parts: the 33-story office section in the front, along Broadway, and a shorter wing in the rear, which formerly housed the Paramount Theatre. This was typical of New York City theater buildings, where the theater was relegated to cheaper lots on side streets, while the office space took up the more valuable frontage on the main avenues. While the building had initially been planned with a 29-story office section, this was changed in the middle of construction. The office tower's decorative details was influenced by the Beaux-Arts style, while the theater was designed in a Neo-Renaissance style. The Art Deco decoration was limited largely to the massing.

1501 Broadway contains eight setbacks, seven of which are above the theater wing. The setbacks are placed on all sides as mandated under the 1916 Zoning Resolution. On 43rd Street, the theater wing is twelve stories tall. On 44th Street, the theater wing is nine stories tall, except for the westernmost bay, which is fourteen stories tall with a setback on the 12th story. Along the office wing, the setbacks on the north, east, and south elevations start above the 18th story; there are six setbacks on these elevations, placed at regular intervals. Each setback is separated by two or three stories. The office wing's west elevation rises above the roof of the theater wing, with a small setback on the 26th story and a deeper setback on the 28th story. The top section of 1501 Broadway rises above the 28th story and is two bays deep. The massing was intended to resemble that of a pyramid or a mountain as depicted in the Paramount Pictures logo.

=== Facade ===
==== Base ====
The first five stories of both wings are clad in limestone and constitute the building's base. The ground story contains storefronts. The main entrance since 2018 is on 43rd Street, with bronze doors and a bronze marquee sign. The 2nd through 4th stories are divided into bays, containing three-story window openings flanked by rusticated piers. The windows on each story are separated by iron spandrels and are divided by vertical iron mullions. The spandrels are ornamented with classical motifs, as well as theatrical icons such as masks, scrolls, and festoons. The 5th story contains one-over-one sash windows with metal frames. Between the 5th-story windows are oval cartouches.

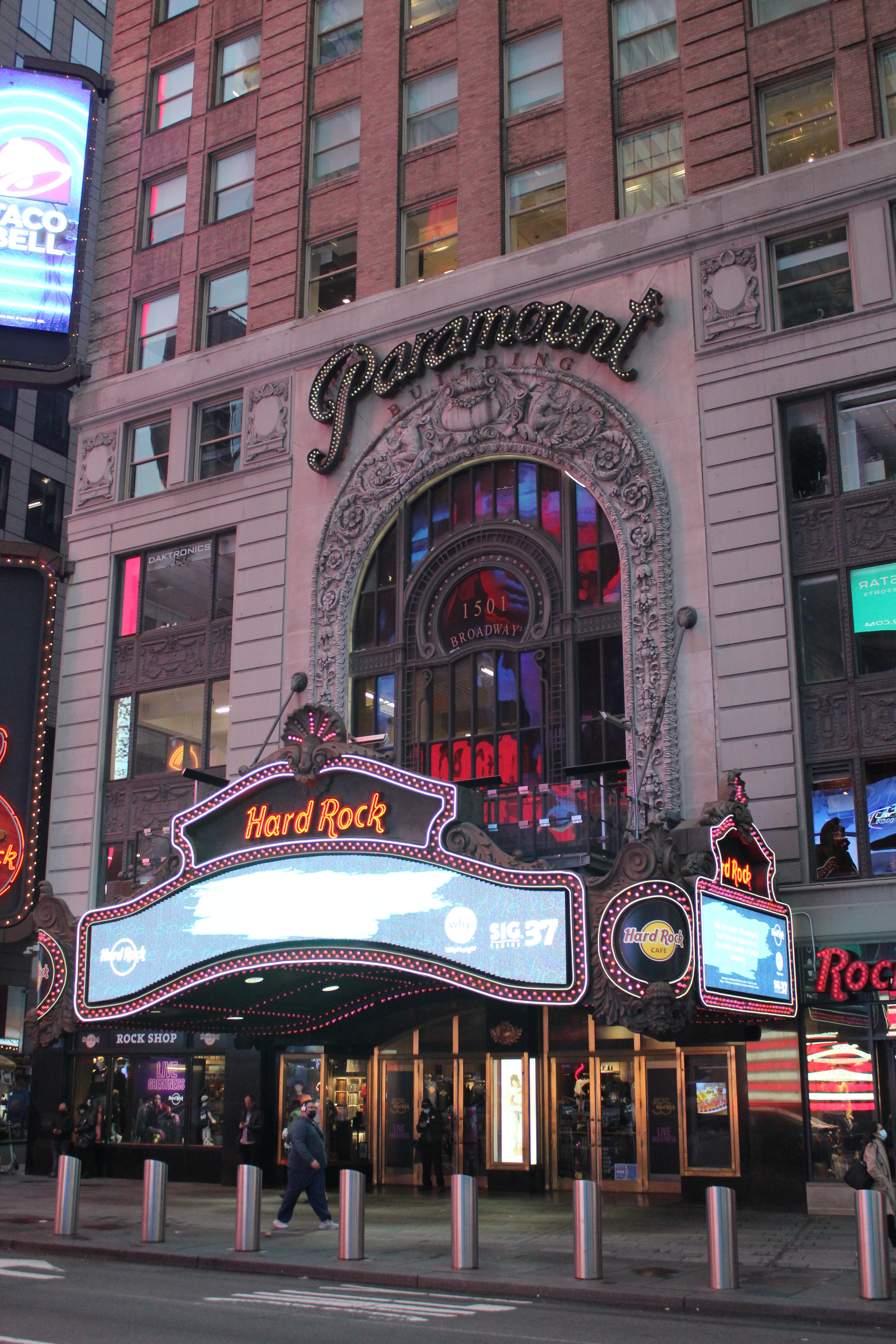
The Paramount arch on Times Square, a replica of the original

The theater entrance was near the south end of the eastern elevation, facing Broadway. Originally, it had a five-story archway and an elaborate curved marquee. The original archway was removed in the late 1960s and replaced with windows and rusticated piers, which were taken from the 43rd Street elevation. The only indication of the former archway was the presence of blank limestone panels instead of windows on the 5th story. The arch was restored in 2001 and is constructed of concrete reinforced with glass fibers. The archway is surrounded by a frame with scrolls, rosettes, and lyre players, attached to a steel frame. The replica marquee, measuring 39 feet (12 m) wide, is made of three glass panels, reinforced with plastic and finished in bronze. The marquee includes a curved LED display but was otherwise designed to match historical specifications. A sign with the name "Paramount" is mounted over the archway and contains 400 lights.

Prior to 2018, the main office entrance was just north of the center bay along Broadway; the opening still exists but leads to a retail space. It contains a double-height limestone frame with a lintel above the second floor. The doorway is divided vertically into a large center section flanked by two narrower sections. At ground level, the entrance includes a set of double doors, flanked by a single door, all made of brass and glass. Above the center doors is a clock flanked by brackets. There are windows above the remainder of the ground floor, as well as another set of windows on the 2nd story. The ground and 2nd stories of the doorway are separated by decorative iron spandrels; the center panel has an oval motif. The spandrels contain other motifs including theater masks, instruments, and branches. The building's cornerstone is placed in a niche within the former main entrance. The cornerstone includes copper boxes with several newspapers' front pages, gold coins, film reels, and a news reel showing Richard E. Byrd's 1926 North Pole flight.

==== Office stories ====
Starting on the 6th story of the office tower, the window openings generally contain one-over-one windows, which are grouped into bays. The bays are divided by alternating narrow and wide piers. The narrow piers are plain, while the wide piers are either rusticated or plain. The rusticated piers project slightly from the facade. The rear wing on 43rd and 44th Streets has double-hung windows separated by plain piers. On 44th Street, there are oval openings at the ninth story, which are surrounded by festoons. The top of the rear wing on 44th Street is decorated with acroteria.

The setbacks of the office tower contain parapets. Below the parapets were floodlights that originally illuminated the setbacks at night to emphasize the jagged massing. Over one thousand lights were used in the setbacks' lighting system. Trapezoidal finials, designed to resemble obelisks, are placed at the setback level atop many of the rusticated piers. On the 28th through 30th stories, there are oversized consoles on the north and south elevations.

==== Clock and globe ====
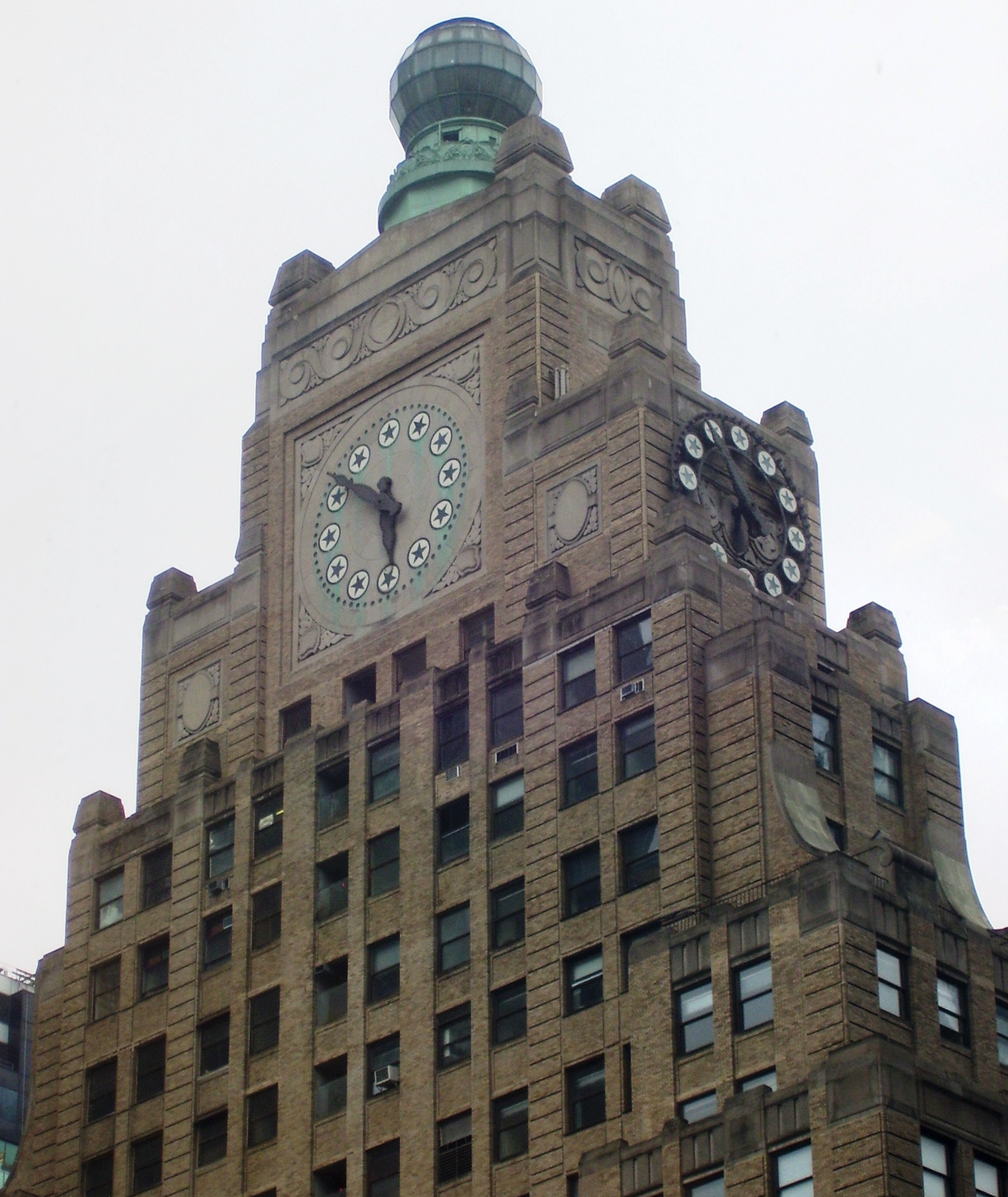
The top of the building, featuring the clock and globe, as seen from the west

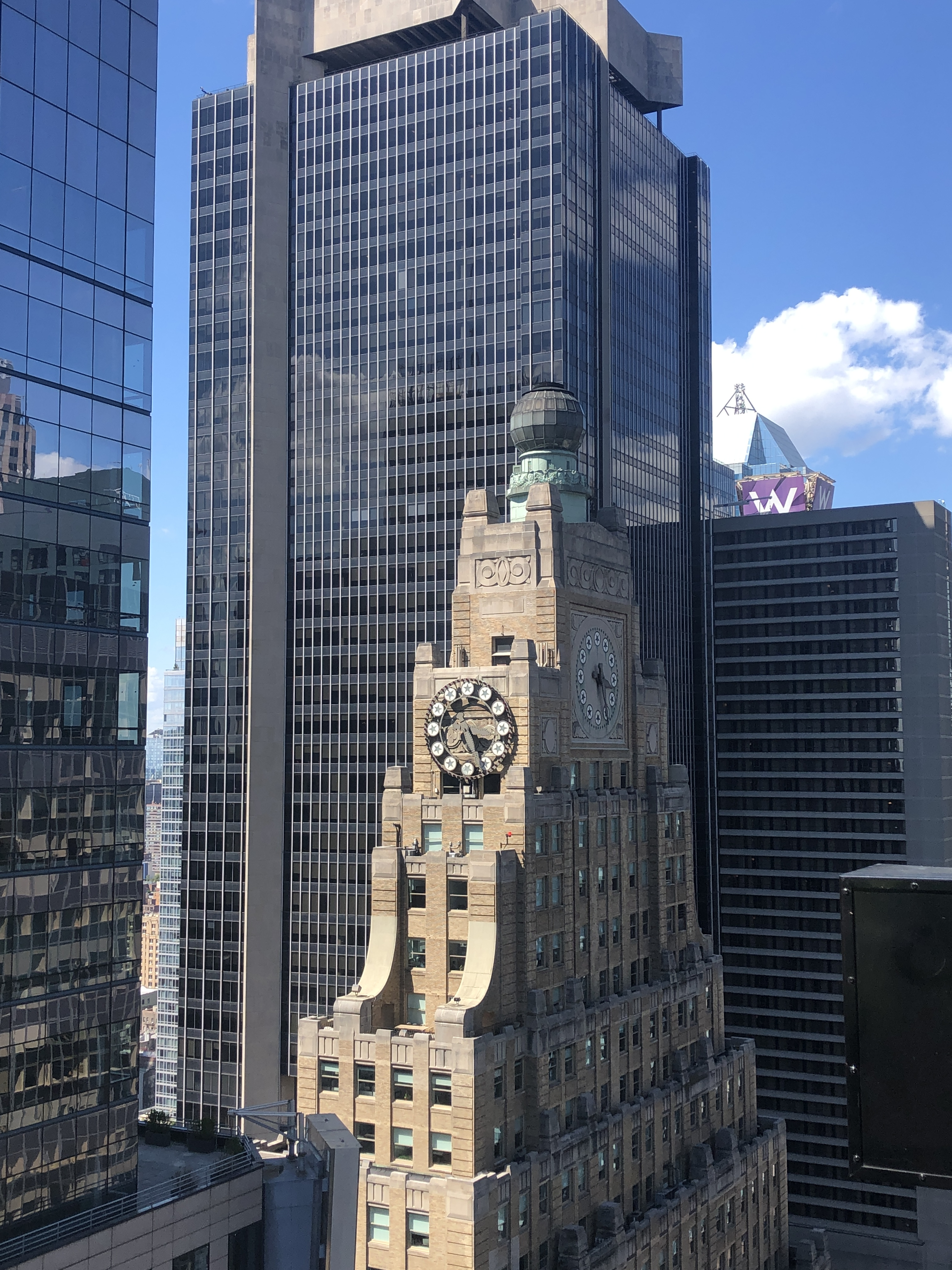
The clock and globe, as seen from One Times Square

The Paramount Building has a large four-faced clock above its 30th story. The clock faces on the west and east are made of limestone, with metal minute and hour hands. The west and east clock faces measure about 25 feet (7.6 m) wide. (Note: The New York Times gives a width of 25 feet (7.6 m), while The Yonkers Herald gives a width of 26 feet (7.9 m) for the larger faces. The New York Herald Tribune says the larger faces are 30 feet (9.1 m) wide and the smaller faces are 26 feet wide.) Inset within the stone are twelve circular glass panels, which measure 4 feet (1.2 m) high and denote the hours. These panels contain five-pointed stars, forming a circle of stars as used in the Paramount Pictures logo. The hour and minute hands were originally illuminated. (Note: When the clock was installed in 1926, the hour hands of the larger faces were 12 feet (3.7 m) long and the minute hands were 17 feet (5.2 m) long. The arms were replaced in 1936 with hour hands measuring 10 feet (3.0 m) long and minute hands measuring 14 feet (4.3 m) long.) Flanking these faces is a pair of setback pavilions with oval cartouches and rusticated piers. The north and south clock faces are placed on these setback pavilions. They are made with metal frames and are smaller than those on the west and east. The clock faces were mechanically operated from the building's completion.

Above the clock faces is a stone frieze and trapezoidal corner obelisks. The top of the building contains a copper pedestal with an ornamental glass and copper sphere measuring 19 feet (5.8 m) across. The sphere is made of 90 square panels, originally decorated with a map of the world. A smokestack is placed within the globe, measuring 2.5 feet (0.76 m) wide, with a maintenance ladder and catwalks inside. The globe was intended to signify Paramount predecessor Famous Players–Lasky, and it originally illuminated once every 15 minutes. (Note: The red light flashed at the following intervals: once at 15 minutes past the hour, twice at 30 minutes past the hour, and three times at 45 minutes past the hour. Every hour on the hour, the red light flashed four times, then the white light flashed the number of hours. For instance, 10:00 p.m. would be signified by four red flashes followed by ten white flashes.) In its early years, the globe could be seen from several miles away at night. During World War II, the globe and clock were painted black to maintain blackout conditions for fear of an enemy invasion. They were restored in 1996. After its restoration, the globe was lit a constant white after dusk, with red pulses every 15 minutes to signify the time, as well as bell chimes. (Note: The red lights flash at the following intervals: once at 15 minutes past the hour, twice at 30 minutes past the hour, three times at 45 minutes past the hour, and four times on the hour.)

In November 1927, a rooftop observation deck opened above the clock at a height of 450 feet (140 m). It included glass-enclosed rooms on either side of the clock. Adults were charged 50 cents for admission, while children paid 25 cents. The observation deck has since been closed. The observation area is narrow, though urban explorers have climbed onto the deck.

=== Interior ===
The central entrance on Broadway led to the offices, while the ornate arched entrance on the south end of the Broadway elevation led to the Paramount Theatre. At ground level, a large amount of space was occupied by the theater's entrance, and other space was taken up by seven storefronts. There was also store space in the basement, as well as a foundation that extended 52 feet (16 m) deep. In total, the building had 6,000 square feet (560 m^{2}) of stores and 2,000 square feet (190 m^{2}) of basements. The office section of the building originally comprised 250,000 square feet (23,000 m^{2}) or 265,000 square feet (24,600 m^{2}). The entire building was served by an emergency staircase, and there were toilets on every floor.

==== Lobby and elevators ====
The original Broadway lobby was relatively small; no one had to travel more than 35 feet (11 m) between the street and any elevator. The space had a travertine floor and polished black-veined marble walls. There was a tenant directory facing the main entrance, as well as a mail chute on the wall between the directory and the entrance. The lobby had a shallow vaulted ceiling with low-relief ornamentation, a gold finish, and bronze chandeliers. Inset into the walls were bronze elevator doors. Originally, the lobby was served by six local and six express elevators. The local elevators traveled only to the 18th floor, while the express elevators skipped some intermediate stories and traveled to the 28th floor. Visitors to the observation deck had to take an express elevator, then transfer to a lift that served the upper offices.

On one side of the lobby was a broad travertine staircase, which led to a second-story banking room occupied by the Chemical National Bank. This banking room was finished with a terrazzo floor and marble base, while all the trim and the counter screens were made of wood. The lower part of the counter screen, and the wainscoting on the walls, were composed of molded wood paneling. which was painted white. The upper part of the counter screen was framed in walnut with a natural finish, and all of the furniture and fixtures of the officers' platform were also made of walnut. Above the woodwork, the walls and ceiling were finished in white-tinted plaster.

In 2018, a third-story sky lobby was completed. The sky lobby includes a two-story escalator atrium and an additional elevator from the entrance on 43rd Street. The offices were originally served by twelve elevators that could travel at up to 700 feet per minute (210 m/min). As of 2021, there are 22 elevators in the building.

==== Former theater space ====
The interior of the theater was decorated with French detailing. The arch connected to a domed rotunda measuring 50 feet (15 m) tall, supported by veined-marble columns on black-and-gold bases. A "Hall of Nations" was just past the rotunda. The Hall of Nations had rocks from 37 countries, accompanied by explanatory plaques, as well as a bust of Thomas Edison. Past that was a grand hall along 43rd Street, which was modeled on the Versailles chapel and measured 150 feet (46 m) long by up to 50 feet (15 m) wide. The hall's design features were also inspired by that of the Paris Opera House's foyer, with white marble columns, balustrades, and a grand staircase flanking the hallway. The vaulted ceiling rose to a height of 50 feet (15 m) and had a mural of the Sun King. Elevators connected with the Paramount Theatre's mezzanine levels and with a basement lounge. An enormous crystal chandelier was hung from the hall.

The 3,664-seat auditorium was at the rear of the building. It was 10 stories tall, with three levels of balcony seats, as well as a promenade for visitors to look down at the theater from overhead. The orchestra was at the south end, while the stage was at the north end. The theater was decorated in rose, turquoise, and ivory colors, with red and gold draperies, as well as a cyclorama-style wall at the rear of the stage. Fountains flanked the proscenium arch above the stage. The height of the theater was emphasized by decorated vertical panels on either side of the proscenium. The theater housed a large organ built by the Wurlitzer company. The railings were manufactured from brass. There were Greek statues and busts carved in wall niches, while the restrooms and waiting rooms were grandiose in style in comparison to cathedrals at the time. In addition to the auditorium, there was a music room and three rehearsal rooms. Various rooms were decorated with artwork, and there were seating lounges and a tea gallery as well. The side rooms were given names, such as the Elizabethan Room, a mixed-gender lounge paneled in walnut.

The theater space was converted to offices in 1967, requiring the installation of 64 steel columns within the auditorium shell. The former auditorium is spanned by eight trusses, each measuring 122 feet (37 m) and weighing 144 short tons (129 long tons; 131 t). The former theater lobby's space is occupied by a Hard Rock Cafe restaurant, spread across 5,500 square feet (510 m^{2}) on the ground floor and 35,000 square feet (3,300 m^{2}) in the basement, as well as a Hard Rock Cafe store measuring 1,500 square feet (140 m^{2}). The restaurant can fit 600 diners or 1,000 concertgoers.

==== Offices ====
The offices were decorated with similar French motifs as the rest of the building. The fourth through twelfth stories, originally occupied by Famous Players–Lasky, included 65 executive offices that were finished in walnut, and some rooms contained veneers of burled walnut, The veneers contained carvings of figures that matched the burled surfaces of the wood. The private offices of Famous Players–Lasky cofounders Adolph Zukor and Jesse L. Lasky were decorated with walnut-paneled walls, separated by wide moldings. These offices had large ceiling beams, which were clad with walnut panels and separated by plaster coffers; the casement windows in these offices contained stained glass panels.

The stories below the 18th floor each contained 16,000 square feet (1,500 m^{2}), while the upper stories were smaller because of the setbacks, tapering to 2,100 square feet (200 m^{2}) at the top. As a result of the setbacks, the floors were also built in eleven different sizes. The smaller upper stories were advertised as being suitable for companies that wanted to consolidate their offices on a full story and occupy it for themselves. Another 190,000 square feet (18,000 m^{2}) or 220,000 square feet (20,000 m^{2}) of office space was added in the late 1960s with the renovation of the former theater wing. The conversion created floor plates of up to 37,000 square feet (3,400 m^{2}) on the lowest stories.

== History ==
Times Square became the epicenter for large-scale theater productions between 1900 and the Great Depression. Famous Players–Lasky, the predecessor to the Paramount Corporation, had been formed in 1916. The company formed a subsidiary, the 1493 Broadway Corporation, to buy the Putnam Building and Westover Court on Times Square in 1919. During the 1920s, Famous Players–Lasky president Adolph Zukor had acquired a controlling interest in the Chicago-based Balaban and Katz theatre chain, operated by Sam Katz, who became the head of Paramount's theatre division. Balaban and Katz had a long working relationship with Chicago architectural firm Rapp and Rapp, which had designed numerous theaters for Katz's company in the Midwest.

=== Development ===
==== Planning ====
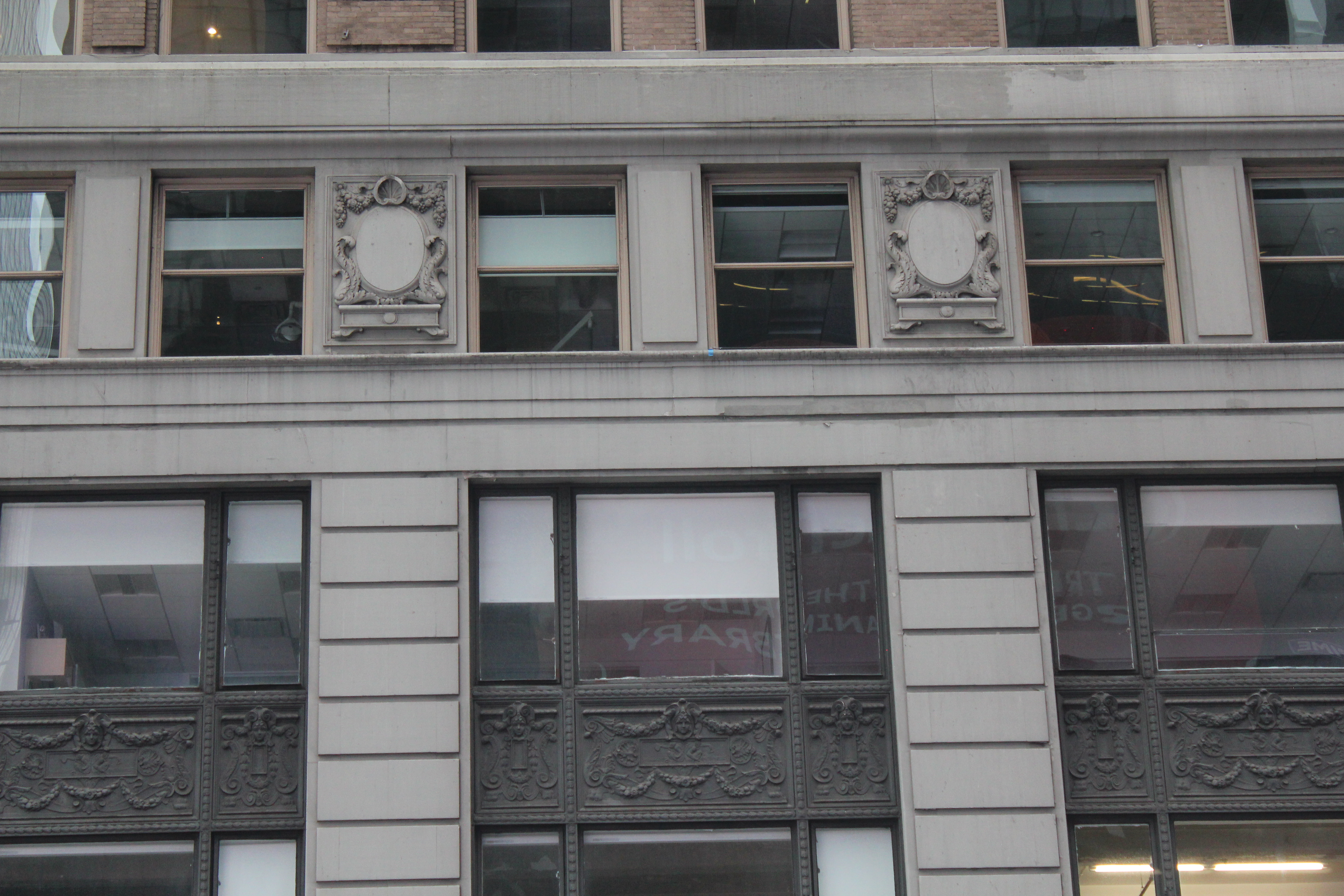
Detail of windows at base

In June 1922, Famous Players–Lasky received a $5.5 million loan from the Prudence Bonds Corporation, and it planned to spend $2.5 million on a 4,000-seat movie theater behind the Putnam Building. Rapp and Rapp were hired to design the new theater. Shortly afterward, Famous Players–Lasky signed a 21-year lease with the 1493 Broadway Corporation. Though Famous Players–Lasky had encountered difficulties in funding its motion pictures by late 1923, Zukor said the corporation would proceed once the lease on Westover Court expired the following year. The size of the site would have allowed a theater with up to 7,000 seats, but this would have required an extremely crowded seating arrangement. Famous Players–Lasky had raised $2 million toward funding the building's construction when it had run into financial issues. Ultimately, the company implemented a financing plan, wherein it cleared the debt from the bond issues. After Famous Players–Lasky's financial issues were resolved, in October 1924, Zukor announced that the company would construct the theater and an office tower.

Early in 1925, Zukor appointed a special committee to oversee the development of the office tower and the as-yet-unnamed theater. That April, Famous Players–Lasky announced that it would erect the 29-story Paramount Building and an adjoining theater for $13.5 million, and Rapp and Rapp filed building plans. The land alone was valued at $4.24 million, an increase from $3.2 million in 1917. In addition to the theater, the building would include ground-story stores, Famous Players–Lasky's offices, a radio broadcasting station, a private rehearsal theater, and a children's nursery. The theater would be operated as part of Famous Players–Lasky's Publix chain. The lowest two stories and the 16th through 31st stories would be rented out, except to theatrical agents, who would instead be offered space at Paramount Studios in Queens. The theater was planned to be completed first, followed by the office tower. The tenants of Westover Court were asked to leave the site by the beginning of June 1925, and the Putnam Building was to be demolished by that October.

==== Construction ====
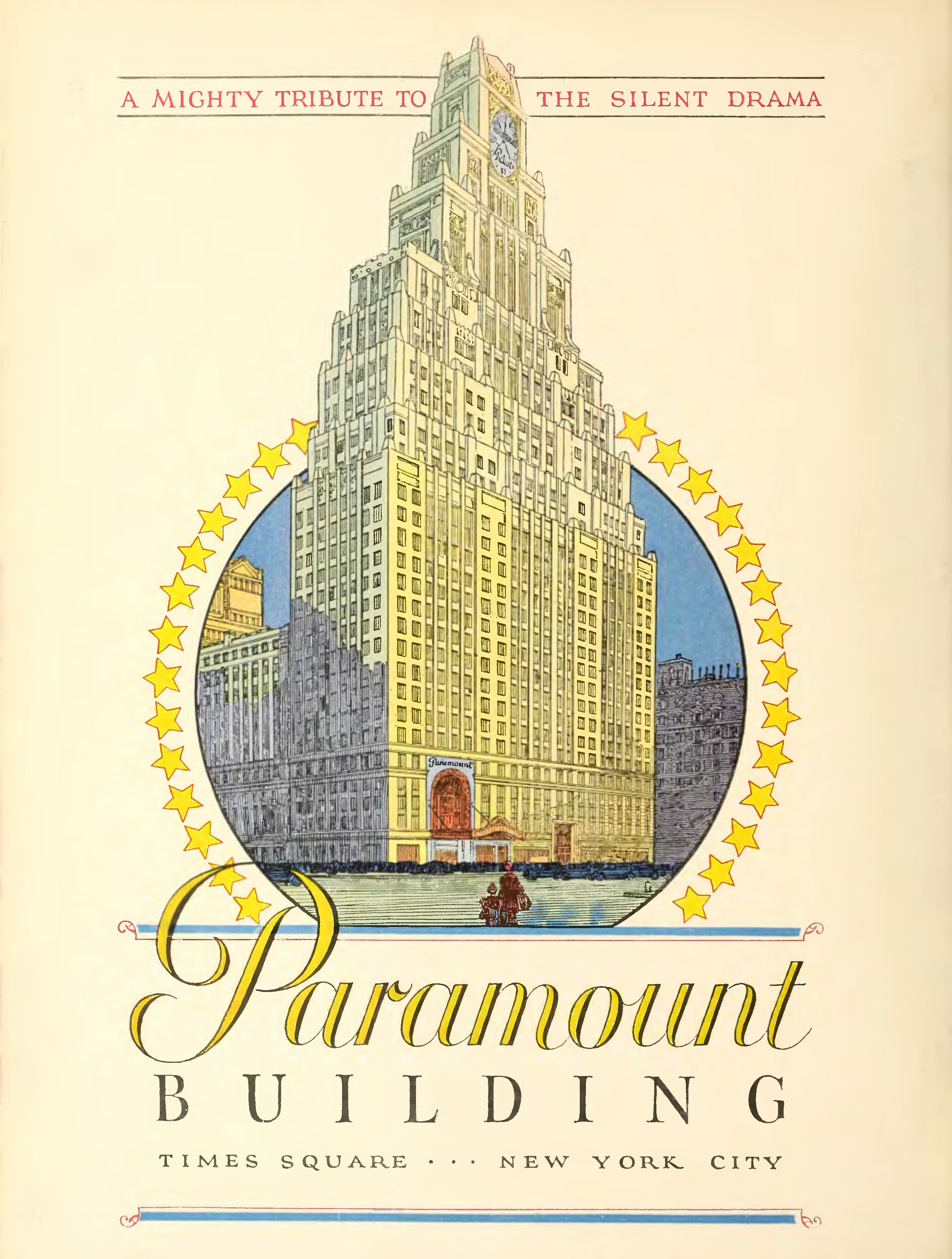
Paramount Building ad in Motion Picture News, 1926

Demolition contracts were awarded in May 1925. Famous Players–Lasky kept a film record of the work, starting with the demolition of Westover Court. To celebrate the project, Famous Players–Lasky held a barbecue in the nearby Hotel Astor that August, serving oxen and lamb that had been roasted over Westover Court's ruins. By September, the Putnam Building was slated to be demolished. In January 1926, the Paramount Broadway Corporation issued a first mortgage consisting of $10 million in bonds with a maturity of 25 years. The same month, the Paramount Broadway Corporation leased the building to Famous Players–Lasky for 25 years at an annual rental of $807,500. By then, the site's valuation had increased to $6 million, making it one of the most valuable sites in the neighborhood. The Broadway Association was tasked with arranging a dedication ceremony for the Paramount Building.

The excavations descended about 53 feet (16 m) into the underlying layer of bedrock. During excavations in February 1926, a water main and a gas main broke, flooding the site. Later that month, the Thompson-Starrett Company began erecting the steel trusses above the auditorium. Traveling derricks were used for the process, which was captured on film and which attracted a large crowd. Inclement weather during that month led to slight delays, prompting Thompson-Starrett to hire contractors for overnight shifts to make up for the lost time. By the end of March, the auditorium's trusses were completed and the steel for the office tower was being erected. In addition, the offices on the first 13 stories had been completely rented, as were much of the 18th through 23rd stories.

Mayor Jimmy Walker laid the ceremonial cornerstone on May 19, 1926, at a ceremony attended by Paramount's cofounders (Zukor and Jesse L. Lasky), as well as various producers and actors. One of the building's architects, C. W. Rapp, died the following month during the construction. The office tower topped out on August 2, 1926, with the raising of the U.S. flag 450 feet (140 m) above street level. The same month, Roman governor Filippo Cremonesi presented an eagle from a Roman palace, on behalf of Italian leader Benito Mussolini, for the theater's Hall of Nations. At that point, a variety of firms had leased space at the building, including Rapp and Rapp, the Western Union Telegraph Company, and the Educational Film Corporation of America. In mid-November 1926, the New York Building Congress distributed craftsmanship awards to 21 construction workers.

=== Early and mid-20th century ===
==== Opening and 1920s ====
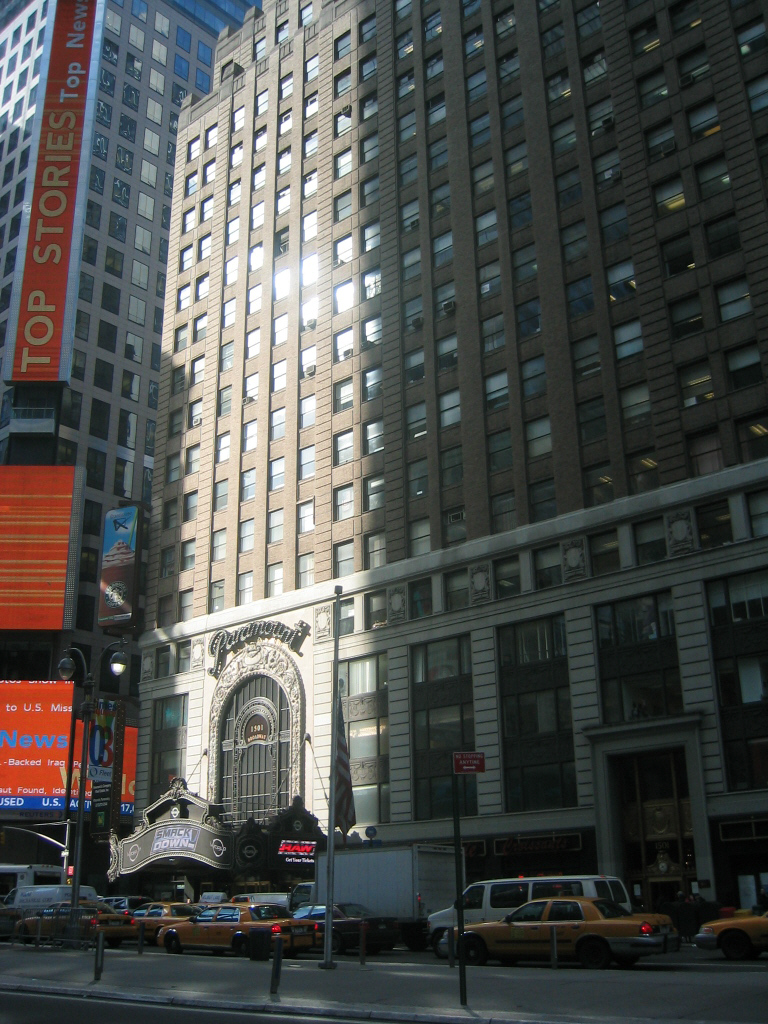
Viewed from across Times Square

The Paramount Theatre opened on November 19, 1926, with a ceremony including thousands of guests. This was part of a three-day celebration of Broadway's 300th anniversary, which included an event in which thousands of balloons were released from the roof of the office tower. To date, $17 million had been spent on the entire project, including $3 million on the theater alone. Within a week of the theater's opening, Famous Players–Lasky estimated that the theater would earn $20,000 a week in net profit. The retail tenants included Chemical Bank, Childs Restaurants, the Knox Hat Company, and the Sarnoff-Irving Hat Store, while the office tenants included four firms listed on the New York Stock Exchange. William A. White & Sons managed the leasing for the Paramount Building. Zukor had the top-story office for himself.

By January 1927, the building was 35 percent rented; the office structure was completed early that year. Some of the storefronts began opening that May, including a barber shop and the Chemical Bank branch. Rapp and Rapp filed plans in July 1927 to convert the basement to a restaurant, and the observation deck opened that November. The building's retail tenants paid rent to Paramount based on a percentage of each tenants' gross profits. Paramount executives frequently patronized the shops, including a 3rd-story barbershop, the Childs Restaurant in the basement, and a Walgreens pharmacy at ground level. Rapp and Rapp filed plans for further alterations in late 1928. By then, Famous Players–Lasky was officially known as the Paramount Famous Lasky Corporation; that company, in turn, became Paramount Publix in 1930.

==== 1930s to 1950s ====
The office tower received several new tenants in the 1930s, including Fusion Party campaign offices, advertisers Donahue & Coe, and Prudential Insurance. By February 1933, Publix was in receivership and seeking to reduce its rent payments; in so doing, the firm moved to downsize its space. A bankruptcy court agreed to reorganize the Paramount Building's debt in May 1934. The yearly interest rate on the bonds was lowered temporarily until half the principal of the bonds was paid off. Paramount Broadway also sued to have the tax assessment for the building reduced by $3 million. Despite opposition by bondholders, Paramount Publix reorganized as Paramount Pictures Inc. in April 1935 and restructured its subsidiary, the Paramount Broadway Corporation. Paramount Pictures owned all stock in Paramount Broadway. The Paramount Theatre at the base closed for one week in 1934, the only extended closure in the theater's history. The next year, the clock faces were refurbished after the hands had become badly corroded.

Paramount Broadway continued to post losses in the years after the reorganization. Conversely, the Paramount Theatre at the building's base became highly popular, especially for live musical performances, hosting performers such as Buddy Holly and Frank Sinatra. William A. White & Son prepared the building for air raids at the beginning of World War II, which led the building to earn an award for air-raid readiness in 1943. In addition, the Paramount Building's tenants collected scrap paper for the war effort, and the globe and clock atop the building were blacked out. By the end of 1944, Paramount Broadway had paid off a $6 million mortgage on the building. Paramount attempted to sell the office building in 1948. After marketing the building for a few months and failing to find a buyer, the company listed it publicly that September for $13 million. The clock faces were repaired in mid-1949.

In 1949, Paramount Pictures' board of directors voted to split the theater unit to a separate company, United Paramount Theatres (UPT). The building became the UPT's headquarters, and UPT leased the theater from Paramount Pictures. In addition, Paramount received a $9 million loan from Prudential Insurance in September 1950, including a $7 million mortgage on the Paramount Building. After UPT's merger with ABC in 1953, the building continued as American Broadcasting-Paramount Theatres (AB-PT)'s headquarters. The Child's Restaurant and Walgreens store at the base, which had occupied the building since its completion, were closed in 1957. AB-PT relocated its headquarters to the ABC studios on 66th Street in 1959, though ABC's film syndication units remained at the Paramount Building. The theater had dropped its stage-show policy in 1952 but was still popular, though it faced increasing competition from television.

=== Late 20th century to present ===
==== Sale and annex conversion ====
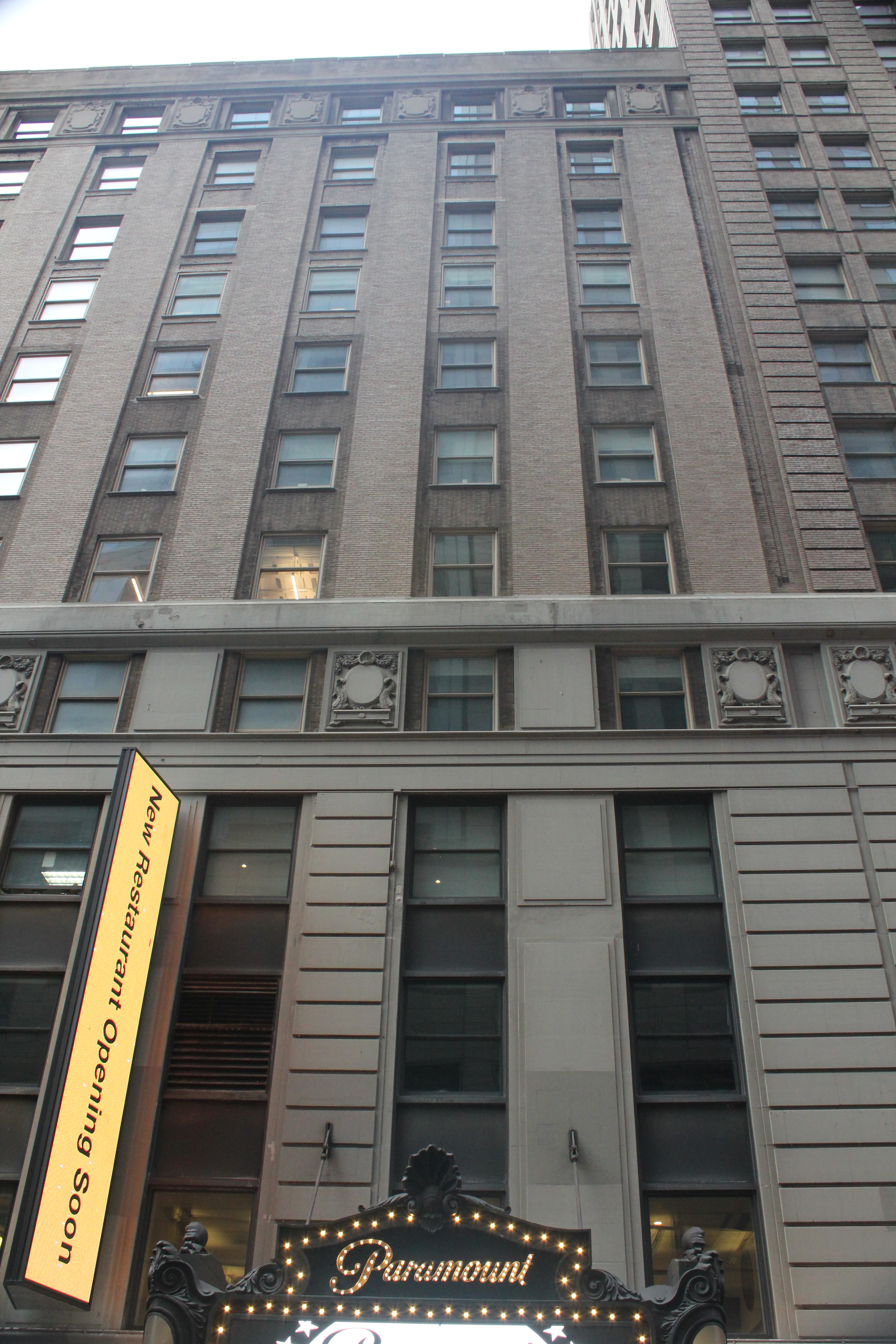
Former theater annex on 43rd Street

William Zeckendorf Jr. of the firm Webb & Knapp offered to buy 1501 Broadway in June 1964, with plans to replace the Paramount Theatre with an exhibit hall and office space. A Webb & Knapp subsidiary had made a $150,000 down payment, with a promise to pay $350,000 before the sale's closing and $10 million at closing. The theater shuttered on August 4, 1964, though it temporarily reopened the next month. Paramount Pictures indicated it would remain in the building. The conclusion of the sale was postponed to October, then to November, when the theater's art was auctioned. 1501 Broadway was finally purchased in December 1964 by Paramount Building Associates, an affiliate of Webb & Knapp, for $10.5 million. By then, Webb & Knapp was financially troubled and was selling off property to pay off debts. The Paramount Theatre was leased for stage/screen programs in March 1965 but closed again that June after failing to attract guests.

Paramount Building Associates contracted to resell 1501 Broadway in May 1965 to Evelyn Sharp, who paid $9 million and planned to renovate the building. Mortimer M. Caplin had been appointed as trustee for Webb & Knapp's operations, and he sought to delay the sale of the building to Sharp. The property title was to have been transferred in June 1965, but Caplin objected to the transfer at the last minute. Caplin presumably wanted Webb & Knapp's $500,000 deposit on the building to be returned to his client. This led Sharp to withdraw from the proposed sale, allowing Caplin to proceed with selling the building at a foreclosure auction. Though the auction garnered no buyers, the building was sold that September to David Rosenthal, Joseph E. Levine, and Philip J. Levin. ABC moved to 1330 Avenue of the Americas afterward, while Paramount moved out after becoming part of the Gulf & Western conglomerate.

The owners planned to build a garage at ground level with offices above. The group began renovating the Paramount Building in January 1967. As part of the renovation, the Paramount Theatre was dismantled and turned into office space, and the archway leading to the theater was removed. That March, Rosenthal and Levine sold their ownership stakes to Levin and Arlen Properties, who split ownership equally between them. Existing tenants were not disrupted by the demolition of the old theater, which had been completed by that October. A branch of the New York Bank for Savings opened in the base in early 1968, while construction was still ongoing, forcing the tellers to wear hard hats.

==== 1970s to 1990s ====
Newmark & Company managed the building on behalf of Arlen, signing ten-year leases for the expanded office stories. Major tenants in the newly converted offices included The New York Times, the Offtrack Betting Corporation, Lane Bryant, and the Metropolitan Diagnostic Institute. The newly converted office space was not fully leased until the mid-1970s. By the end of that decade, many lower-story tenants had chosen not to renew, including the Times and Lane Bryant, but Newmark had added other tenants, including the Internal Revenue Service and Hardesty & Hanover. By contrast, the upper stories were fully rented. In addition to the larger tenants, the Paramount Building hosted smaller offices such as those of the National Endowments for the Arts and Humanities. All of the space in the building had been rented by the mid-1980s.

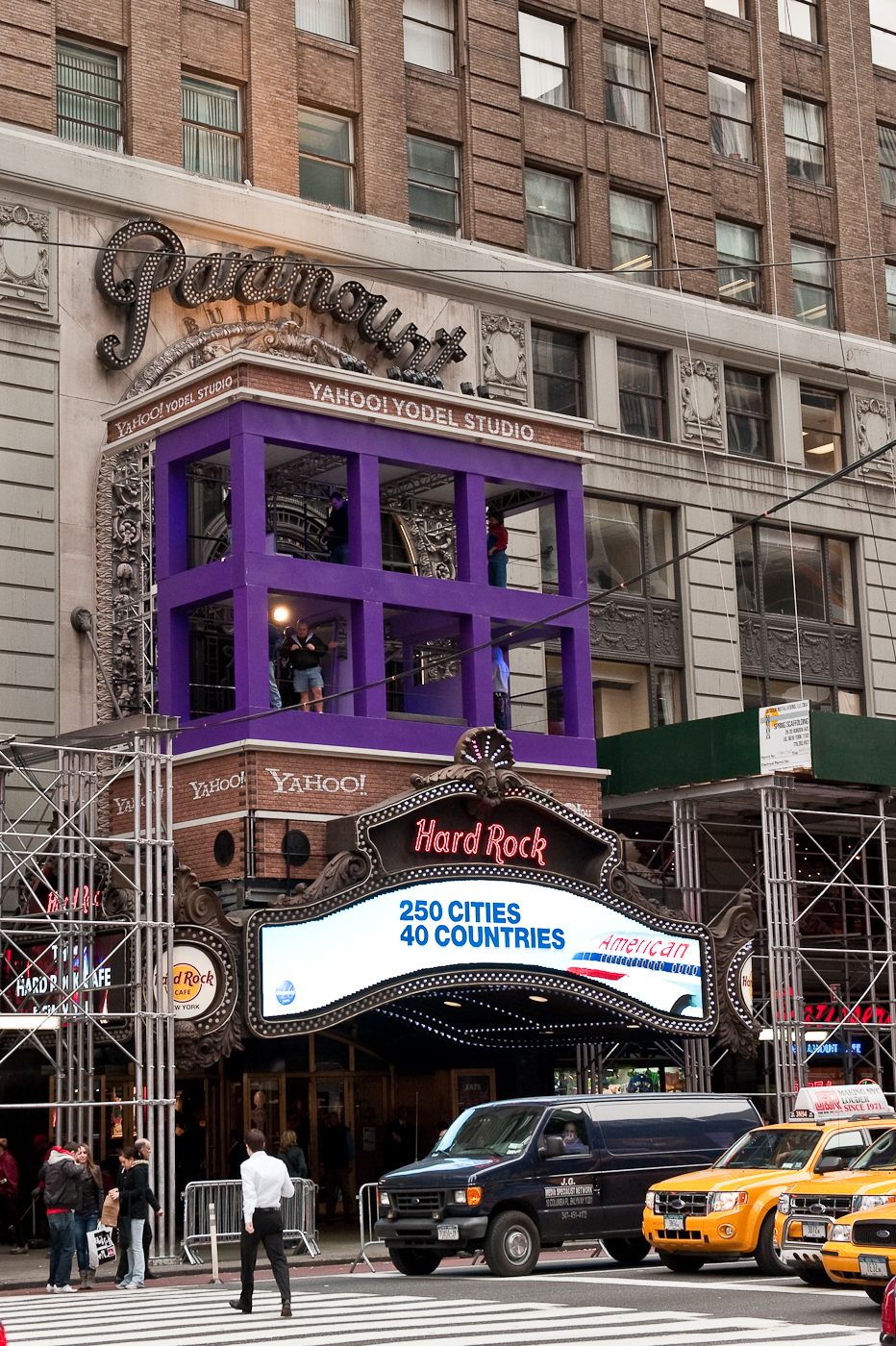
Hard Rock Cafe

The New York City Landmarks Preservation Commission (LPC) designated the Paramount Building as a city landmark in November 1988. The building was designated for its historical importance to the motion-picture industry and for its architectural importance as an Art Deco skyscraper. In 1996, Newmark received permission from the LPC to restore the clock and globe atop the building and the large arch on Broadway. An imitation of the original marquee was to be placed in front of the arch. This was part of the company's effort to attract a retailer to the basement. Planet Hollywood, which planned to lease the basement, was to pay for the restoration. The restoration of the clock and globe involved changing the power supply and rebuilding the clock mechanism. The clock and globe were restored at the end of 1997.

Planet Hollywood spent $13 million on renovating 1501 Broadway's ground-floor space into a venue for live music. Tobin Parnes was the restoration architect. The project entailed lowering the basement by 7 feet (2.1 m), removing three support columns, and lengthening nine more columns. Following Planet Hollywood's financial troubles, it sold the basement and first-floor space to World Wrestling Federation Entertainment (WWF; later WWE) in July 1999 for $9 million. WWF planned to open a theme restaurant at the base, known as WWF New York, and the company spent $7.5 million.

==== 2000s to present ====
WWF New York opened in November 1999. That May, the LPC approved the addition of an LED marquee after initially hesitating to do so. The new marquee was unveiled with an American flag display on September 12, 2001, one day after the September 11 attacks. WWE closed its store and restaurant (renamed to The World) in early 2003, only three years after opening the restaurant. Bubba Gump Shrimp Company opened a restaurant in the building that year. Hard Rock Cafe decided to move into the WWE space in 2004, citing the improvements that WWE had already made. Numerous retailers took space at 1501 Broadway in the early 2010s including Ben & Jerry's and the New York Yankees.

Paramount Leasehold LP, the building's owner, obtained a $130 million mortgage from Cantor Commercial Real Estate in 2013. Paramount Leasehold planned to spend $50 million on renovating the building; it also considered adding an entrance on 43rd Street. At the time, 1501 Broadway was 70 percent occupied, and its tenants included entertainment companies and attorneys. The LPC approved the renovation project in 2016. The lobby was moved from Broadway to 43rd Street, and a tenant lounge was installed on the third story. In addition, elevators and escalators were added, while hallways, restrooms, and windows were upgraded. The contractors replicated the historical features using plaster moldings, and some original architectural details were salvaged and relocated. A specialty contractor provided the custom cast-bronze pieces and an Italian quarry supplied marble for the renovation.

The lobby relocation was completed in mid-2018, after which Newmark signed leases with tenants such as the KIPP Foundation and the American Federation of Musicians. The entire renovation was completed in 2019. JPMorgan Chase gave Levin and Newmark a $200 million loan for 1501 Broadway in early 2020, and the owners began adding a tenant lounge on the third story that year. Ticketing platform TodayTix moved to 1501 Broadway in 2022, and the Martha Graham Dance Company leased space there in 2025, with plans to renovate one floor.

== Critical reception ==
When the Paramount Building was completed, architect Francisco Mujica wrote that the building exemplified how setback skyscrapers resembled "the primitive pyramids of America". H. I. Brock of The New York Times wrote that the Paramount Building was "the most extraordinary pile in New York". Conversely, Lewis Mumford said "the posters describe it as the greatest palace that shadows have built", a phrase that had been created by film industry promoters, "but it is in fact the greatest shadow that shadows have built". While Mumford characterized the exterior as something that nobody could see, he called the interior "the reminiscence of a grandiose nightmare that might follow a rather arduous day of sightseeing in Paris". George Shepard Chappell, writing in The New Yorker under the pseudonym "T-Square", wrote that he could not "conscientiously give the building anything except size"; in Chappell's view, this fit with the "concentrated tawdriness" of Times Square.

In the 1980s, The New York Times wrote that Times Square's skyline was characterized by "the beautiful Astor Hotel, the sleekly new Paramount Building and, of course, Times Tower". The Times wrote that despite 1501 Broadway's location at the middle of Times Square, "some New Yorkers have never bothered craning their necks to see" the building's attributes, including its globe and clock. 1501 Broadway was also significant in the film industry. Years after the destruction of the theater and the relocation of Paramount itself, Variety magazine said that "1501 Broadway will always be a symbol of 'where the action was'".

== See also ==
- Architecture of New York City
  - Art Deco architecture of New York City
- List of buildings and structures on Broadway in Manhattan
- List of New York City Designated Landmarks in Manhattan from 14th to 59th Streets
