= Gettysburg Regional Airport =

- IATA: GTY; ICAO: none; FAA LID: W05

Summary
- Airport type: Public
- Owner: Susquehanna Area Regional Airport Authority
- Location: 1130 Chambersburg Road, PA 17325, Adams County Gettysburg Pennsylvania
- Elevation AMSL: 590 ft (180 m)
- Coordinates: 39°50′39″N 77°16′18″W
- Interactive map of Gettysburg Regional Airport

Runways
| Direction | Length | | Surface |
| Direction | ft | m | Surface |
|---|---|---|---|
| 6/24 | 3,100 | 945 | Asphalt |

Gettysburg Regional Airport (IATA: GTY, FAA LID: W05), formerly known as the Gettysburg Airport and Travel Center and as Doersom Airport, is a general aviation airport located two miles (4 km) west of Gettysburg, in Cumberland Township, Adams County, Pennsylvania. The airport is situated approximately 38 miles (61 km) south of Harrisburg. The airport is roughly 47 acres (190,000 m^{2}) in area.

== History ==
The airport was established by Charles Francis Doersom in 1928. Doersom hoped to attract commercial services, but initially the field opened as a general aviation facility supporting parachute operations, flight training and aircraft maintenance. It is located on roughly 47 acres (190,000 m^{2}) in Cumberland Township, Pennsylvania. On August 25, 2006, the Susquehanna Area Regional Airport Authority acquired the airport and changed its official name.

=== Doug Hughes gyrocopter flight ===
On April 15, 2015 postal worker Douglas Hughes towed a gyrocopter to the airport and took off on a flight to the United States Capitol. He carried 535 letters which he intended to deliver to each member of Congress in protest over campaign financing corruption. Hughes was arrested on landing, prompting the United States Secret Service and large numbers of law enforcement officers to swarm the airport, seizing Hughes' vehicle and trailer. The incident highlighted serious concerns about the security of and monitoring of protected airspace as Hughes was able to take-off from Gettysburg undetected, prompting a Joint Senate Committee to call for changes to penalties and procedures in the event of intentional incursions.

== Facilities ==
Gettysburg Regional Airport has one runway:

- Runway 6/24: 3,100 x 60 ft (945 x 18 m), Surface: Asphalt
- Partial taxiway on either side of the runway provides access to the hangar areas and fuel farm.
- Landside facilities include four hangar units, 18,682 sq ft (2,075.8 sq yd; 1,735.6 m^{2}) of hangar space.

== Accidents and incidents ==
On April 15, 2015 postal worker Douglas Hughes towed a gyrocopter to the airport and took off on a flight to the United States Capitol. He carried 535 letters which he intended to deliver to each member of Congress in protest over campaign financing corruption. Hughes was arrested on landing, prompting the United States Secret Service and large numbers of law enforcement officers to swarm the airport, seizing Hughes' vehicle and trailer.

== Statistics ==
- 9,600 total aircraft operations for 2005

== See also ==
- List of airports in Pennsylvania
