= 573d Bombardment Squadron =

573d Bombardment Squadron (Later 573d Tactical Air Support Squadron)
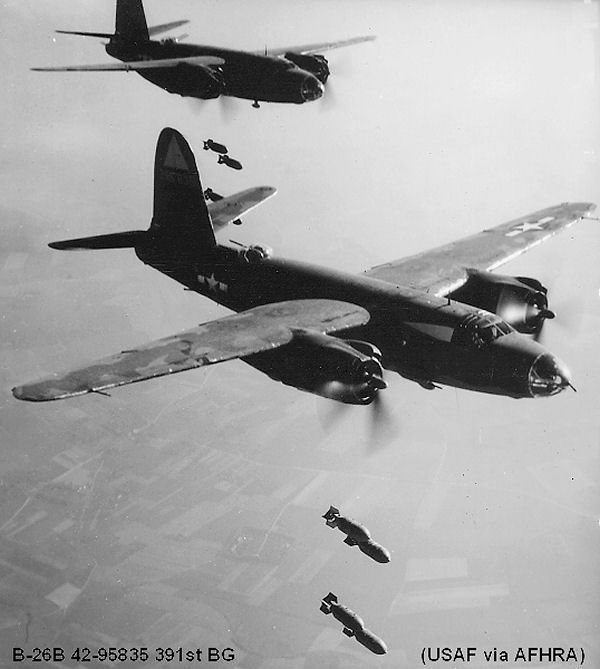
- Martin B-26 Marauders of the 391st Bombardment Group (Note: Aircraft in foreground is Martin B-26B-50-MA Marauder, serial 42-95835.)
- Active: 1943-1945; 1956
- Country: United States
- Branch: United States Air Force
- Role: Light bomber
- Engagements: European Theater of Operations
- Decorations: Distinguished Unit Citation

Insignia
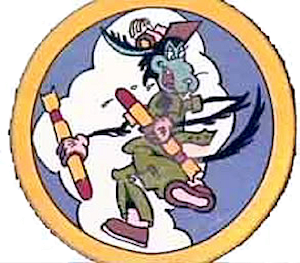
- 573d Bombardment Squadron emblem
- World War II fuselage code: T6

The 573d Tactical Air Support Squadron is an inactive United States Air Force unit. It was formed by the consolidation of two earlier units bearing the number 573, but has not been active since the consolidation.

The first predecessor of the squadron is the 573d Bombardment Squadron, a World War II unit assigned to the 391st Bombardment Group. After training in the United States, the squadron moved to England, and participated in operations against Germany from there and the European Continent as part of IX Bomber Command. It earned a Distinguished Unit Citation for its combat actions. Following V-E Day, the squadron returned to the United States and was inactivated at the port of embarkation.

The squadron's second predecessor is the 573d Fighter-Day Squadron, which formed part of the 342d Fighter-Day Wing, when the Air Force reopened Myrtle Beach Air Force Base. A few months after it was activated, the squadron transferred its personnel and equipment to another squadron and was inactivated. The two squadrons were consolidated in 1985.

== History ==
=== World War II ===
The first predecessor of the squadron, the 573d Bombardment Squadron, was activated at MacDill Field, Florida on 21 January 1943 as one of the four original squadrons of the 391st Bombardment Group. After training with Martin B-26 Marauder in the United States, it departed for the European Theater of Operations in December 1943.

The squadron gathered at RAF Matching, its first combat station in theater, in late January 1944 and flew its first combat mission on 15 February. It initially concentrated on attacks to support Operation Overlord, the invasion of Normandy, by attacking airfields, bridges and marshalling yards. It attacked V-1 flying bomb and V-2 rocket launch sites as part of Operation Crossbow. On D-Day and the next day it struck German coastal defenses near the invasion beaches.

Until September, the squadron continued attacks from its English base. It supported Operation Cobra, the breakout at Saint Lo in late July by attacking fuel dumps and troop concentrations, then hit transportation and communications targets to slow the German retreat eastward. In late September it moved to Roye-Amy Airfield, France to be closer to the advancing ground forces it was supporting and extending its targets into Germany. From its continental bases, it hit bridges, railroads, highways, ammunition dumps and other targets. The unit was also tasked on occasion to drop propaganda leaflets.

During the Battle of the Bulge, it attacked heavily defended bridges and viaducts. Performing these attacks without fighter escort in the face of heavy flak and overwhelming attacks by enemy fighters earned the squadron a Distinguished Unit Citation for the period between 23 December and 26 December 1944. On 23 December, it attacked a rail viaduct at Ahrweiler. Although its fighter escort failed to arrive due to adverse weather, the squadron continued its attack, despite the loss of both pathfinder planes leading the attack. More than 60 Luftwaffe fighters attacked the 391st Group's formations while it was on its bomb run. The 391st Group lost 16 of its Marauders on this attack. The following day, the squadron destroyed the railroad viaduct at Konz-Karthaus.

The squadron continued its attacks, concentrating on German transportation and communications systems. It converted to the Douglas A-26 Invader in April and flew its last combat mission on 3 May 1945. The squadron left Europe in September 1945 and was inactivated on arrival at the port of embarkation, Camp Myles Standish, Massachusetts, on 13 October 1945.

=== Training for tactical fighter operations ===
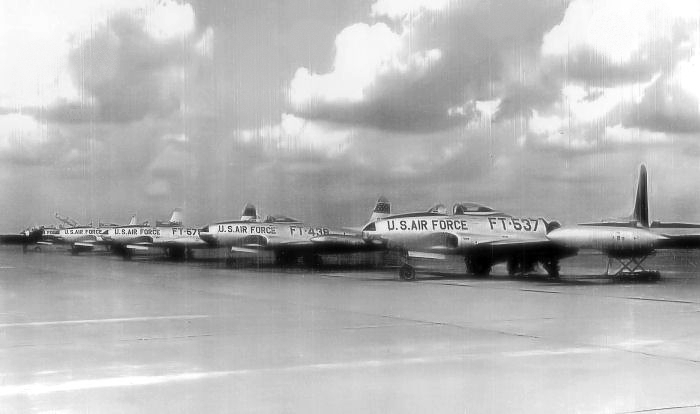
342d Fighter-Day Group F-80s and T-33s on Myrtle Beach AFB ramp] (Note: The first three are Lockheed F-80C-5-LO Shooting Star. serial 47-537 (later converted to RF-80C), and Lockheed F-80A-5-LO Shooting Starss 44-85434 and 44-85440 (upgraded to F-80A-11-LO). Baugher, Joe (10 March 2023). "1944 USAF Serial Numbers". Joe Baugher.. Baugher, Joe (20 April 2023). "1946 to 1948 USAF Serial Numbers". Joe Baugher.. In the background is a two seat Lockheed T-33A T-Bird.)

The squadron's second predecessor is the 573d Fighter-Day Squadron, which was activated in July 1956 as part of the 342d Fighter-Day Group when the Air Force re-opened Myrtle Beach Air Force Base, South Carolina. The squadron began training with Lockheed T-33 T-Bird advanced jet trainers in preparation for equipping with the North American F-100 Super Sabre. However, before the squadron could reach operational status, it was inactivated and its personnel and equipment were transferred to the 356th Fighter-Day Squadron.

The 573d Fighter-Day Squadron and 573d Bombardment Squadron were consolidated as the 573d Tactical Air Support Squadron on 19 September 1985, but the consolidated unit has not been active.

== Lineage ==
573d Bombardment Squadron

- Constituted as the 573d Bombardment Squadron (Medium) on 15 January 1943

Activated on 21 Jan 1943
Redesignated 573d Bombardment Squadron, Medium c. 9 October 1944
Redesignated 573d Bombardment Squadron, Light on 23 June 1945
Inactivated on 29 Oct 1945
Consolidated with 573d Fighter-Day Squadron as the 573d Tactical Air Support Squadron on 19 September 1985

573d Tactical Air Support Squadron

- Constituted as the 573d Fighter-Day Squadron on 7 May 1956

Activated on 25 July 1956
Inactivated on 19 November 1956
Consolidated with 573d Bombardment Squadron as the 573d Tactical Air Support Squadron on 19 September 1985

=== Assignments ===
- 391st Bombardment Group, 21 January 1943 – 25 October 1945
- 342d Fighter-Day Group, 25 July–19 November 1956

=== Stations ===
-

- MacDill Field, Florida, 21 January 1943
- Myrtle Beach Bombing and Gunnery Range, South Carolina, 23 May 1943
- Godman Field, Kentucky, 8 September–31 December 1943
- RAF Matching (AAF-166), England 26 January 1944
- Roye-Amy Airfield (A-73), France c. 1 October 1944
- Asch Airfield (Y-29), Belgium c. 20 April 1945
- Vitry-En-Artois Airfield (A-67), France, 27 May 1945
- Laon-Athies Airfield (A-69), France, 27 July–23 September 1945
- Camp Myles Standish, Massachusetts, 12–13 October 1945
- Myrtle Beach Air Force Base, South Carolina, 25 July–19 November 1956

=== Aircraft ===
- Martin B-26 Marauder, 1943-1945
- Douglas A-26 Invader, 1945
- Lockheed T-33 T-Bird, 1956

=== Awards and campaigns ===
Award streamer	Award	Dates	Notes
	Distinguished Unit Citation	23-26 December 1944	573d Bombardment Squadron

Campaign Streamer	Campaign	Dates	Notes
	Air Offensive, Europe	26 January 1944 – 5 June 1944	573d Bombardment Squadron
	Air Combat, EAME Theater	26 July 1943 – 11 May 1945	573d Bombardment Squadron
	Normandy	6 June 1944 – 24 July 1944	573d Bombardment Squadron
	Northern France	25 July 1944 – 14 September 1944	573d Bombardment Squadron
	Rhineland	15 September 1944 – 21 March 1945	573d Bombardment Squadron
	Ardennes-Alsace	16 December 1944 – 25 January 1945	573d Bombardment Squadron
	Central Europe	22 March 1944 – 21 May 1945	573d Bombardment Squadron
