= 111th Attack Wing =

Unit of the Pennsylvania Air National Guard

111th Attack Wing

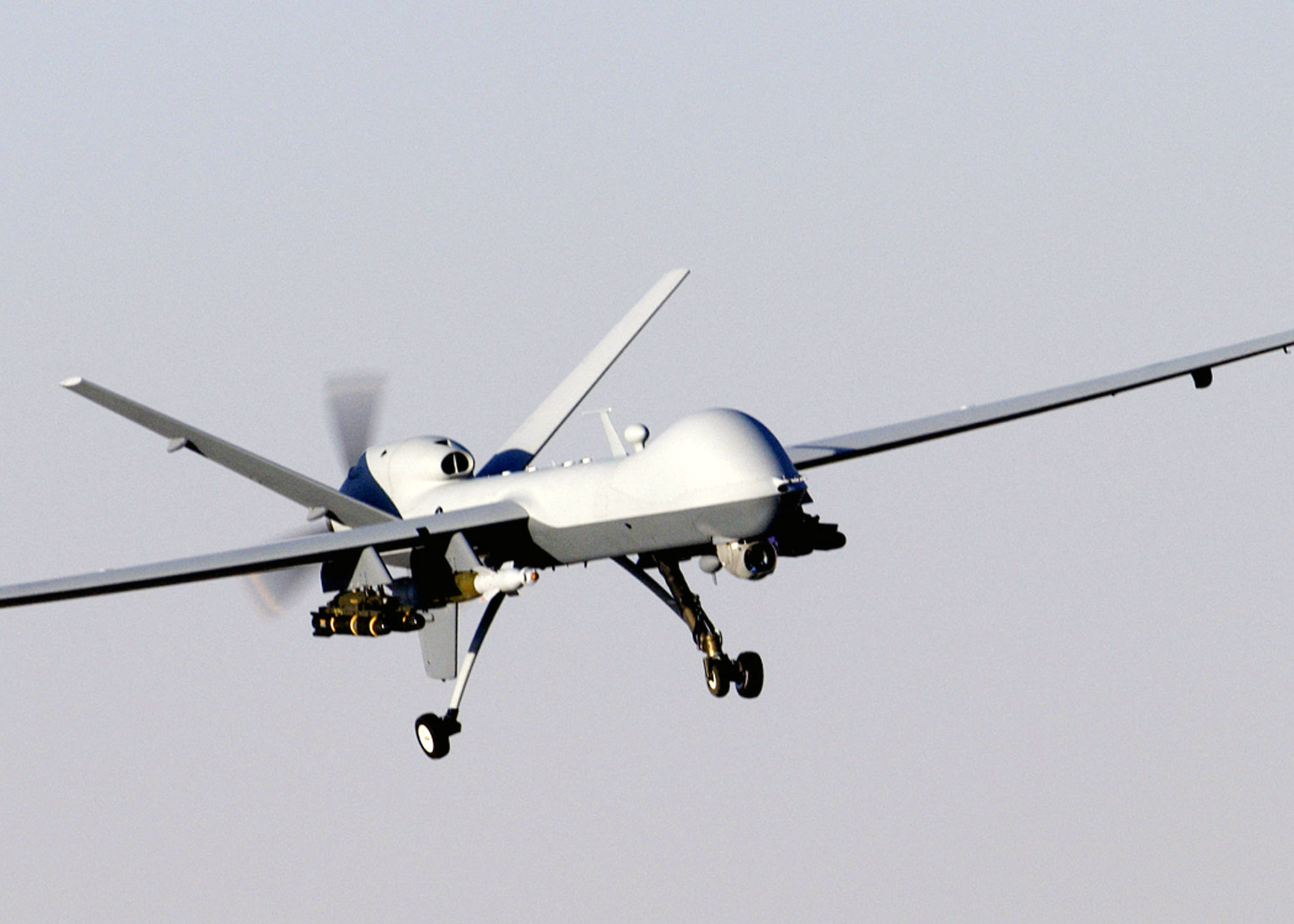
- MQ-9 Reaper in flight (2007)
- Active: 1943–1945; 1948–1952; 1953–1969; 1969–present
- Country: United States
- Allegiance: Pennsylvania
- Branch: Air National Guard
- Type: Wing
- Role: Ground attack
- Part of: Pennsylvania Air National Guard
- Garrison/HQ: Biddle Air National Guard Base, Willow Grove, Pennsylvania
- Engagements: European Theater of Operations
- Decorations: Distinguished Unit Citation

Insignia
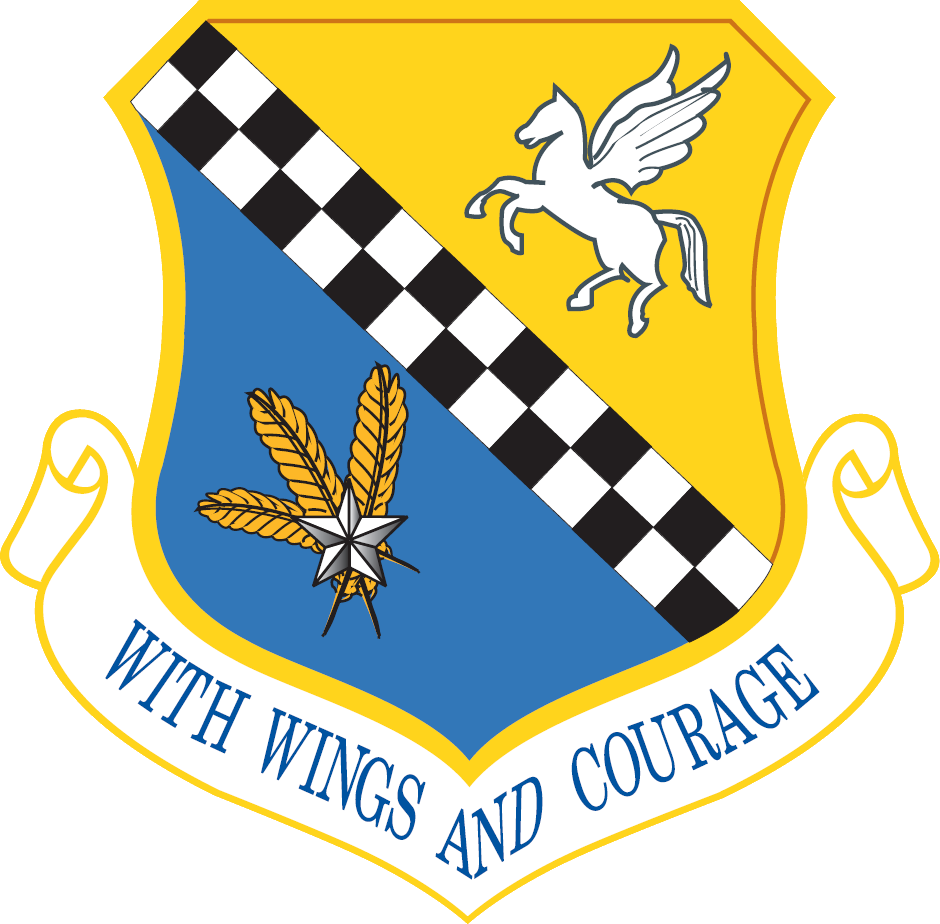
- 111th Attack Wing emblem (Note: Approved 11 January 1954.)

Aircraft flown
- Attack: MQ-9 Reaper

The 111th Attack Wing is a unit of the Pennsylvania Air National Guard, headquartered at Biddle Air National Guard Base in Horsham, Pennsylvania. If activated to federal service, the Wing is gained by the United States Air Force Air Combat Command. It provides protection of life, property, and the preservation of peace and order when tasked to do so by state or federal authorities. The Wing also provides operational and support units, as well as qualified personnel, to support wartime tasking and contingency commitments of any nature.

The 103d Attack Squadron is a descendant organization of the 103d Observation Squadron, formed on 27 June 1924. It was one of the 29 original National Guard Observation Squadrons of the United States Army National Guard formed before World War II.

== Mission ==
Currently, the wing uses General Atomics MQ-9 Reapers to directly support combatant commanders across the globe providing; surveillance, reconnaissance gathering capabilities, combat search and rescue, and weapons employment when called upon. The wing hosts several new tenant organizations at Horsham ANGB including units of the Pennsylvania Army National Guard and the U.S. Army Reserve, among others.

== Units ==
111th Attack Wing's main units:

- 111th Operations Group
- 103rd Attack Squadron - MQ-9 Reaper
- 111th Medical Group
- 111th Mission Support Group

== History ==
=== World War II ===
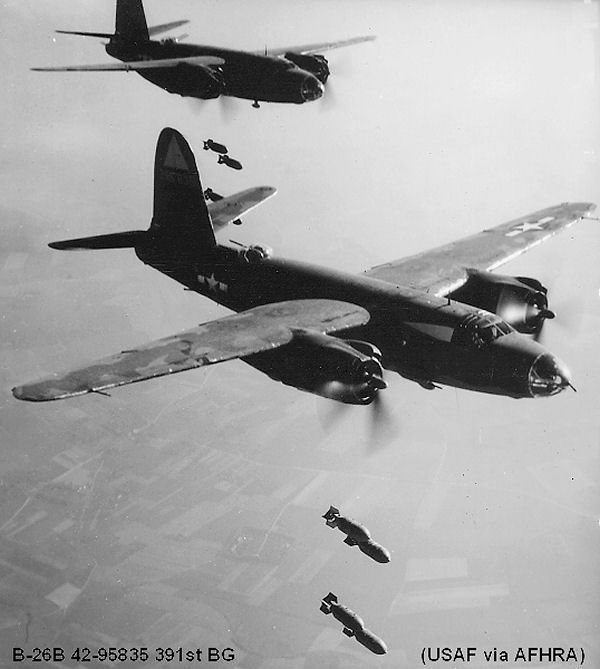
Martin B-26B Marauder Serial 42-95835 of the 391st Bomb Group.

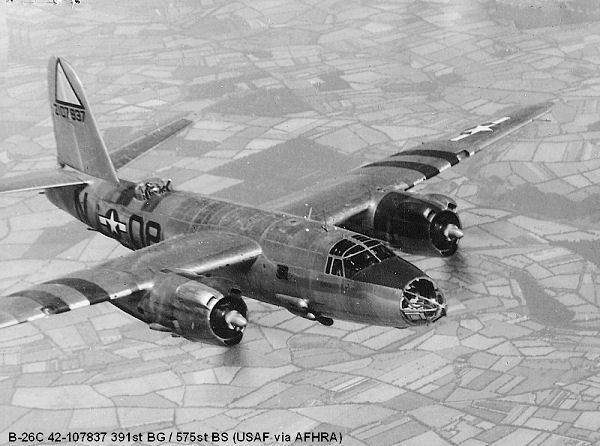
Martin B-26C Marauder Serial 42-107837 of the 575th Bomb Squadron.

Constituted as 391st Bombardment Group (Medium) on 15 January 1943 and activated on 21 January Trained with B-26's for duty in Europe with Ninth Air Force. Assigned to RAF Matching, England on 26 January 1944. The group marking was a yellow triangle painted on the tail fin of their B-26s.

The first mission was flown on 15 February and 150 more were completed before the group moved into France in late September 1944. During the ensuing weeks the 391st bombed targets such as airfields, marshalling yards, bridges, and V-weapon sites in France and the Low Countries to help prepare for the invasion of Normandy. The group attacked enemy defenses along the invasion beaches on 6 and 7 June 1944. From June through September, the group continued cross-Channel operations, which included attacks on fuel dumps and troop concentrations in support of Allied forces during the breakthrough at Saint-Lô in July 1944, and strikes on transportation and communications to block the enemy's retreat to the east.

A total of 20 B-26s were missing in action during the 391st's operations from Matching before the group moved onto the continent, transferring to Roye/Amy, France (ALG A-73) on 19 September 1944. The group then switched to Douglas A-26 Invaders and flew its last mission on 3 May 1945 from Asche, Belgium (ALG Y-29).

The 391st Bomb Group returned to the United States in October and was inactivated at Camp Shanks, New York on 25 October 1945.

=== Pennsylvania Air National Guard ===
The wartime 391st Bombardment Group was reactivated, redesignated the 111th Bombardment Group, and allotted to the National Guard, on 24 May 1946. It was organized at Philadelphia International Airport and was extended federal recognition on 20 December 1948. group was equipped with Douglas B-26B/C Invaders and was assigned to the PA ANG 53d Fighter Wing. In the fall of 1950, the National Guard reorganized along the lines of the Wing Base organization, which placed combat groups and their supporting units under a single wing. The group became the 111th Composite Group in November 1950, gaining the 142d Fighter Squadron and was reassigned to the new 111th Composite Wing. However, the 142d was reassigned in February 1951, and the group returned to its bombardment designation.

==== Korean War activation ====
The group was called to active duty for the Korean War. However, the group's 117th and 122d Bombardment Squadrons were reassigned shortly after being activated, moving to Langley Air Force Base with the group's B-26s to become crew training units. The group, wing headquarters, support units, and 103d Bombardment Squadron moved to Fairchild Air Force Base, Washington on 10 April. In August, the group was redesignated the 111th Strategic Reconnaissance Group, assigned two new operational squadrons, and began to equip with Boeing RB-29 Superfortress reconnaissance aircraft. Based on the World War II B-29 Bomber, the RB-29s were configured with multiple aerial cameras for mapping and reconnaissance missions. On 13 June 1952, two 111th pilots were flying an RB-29 over the Soviet Union when they were shot down by a pair of Mikoyan-Gurevich MiG-15s. The RB-29 was never recovered, having crashed in the waters off of Vladivostok. The families of the Air Guard aircrew were told they had simply "vanished" in a weather reconnaissance flight near Japan. It wasn't until the fall of the Soviet Union and the opening of Cold War archives that the crew's relatives found out the truth in 1993. It is unknown as to whether any of the crew of this aircraft were captured by the Soviets at that time. Three days later, Strategic Air Command reorganized under the dual deputy system. The group was inactivated and its squadrons reassigned directly to the 111th Strategic Reconnaissance Wing.

==== Cold War air defense ====
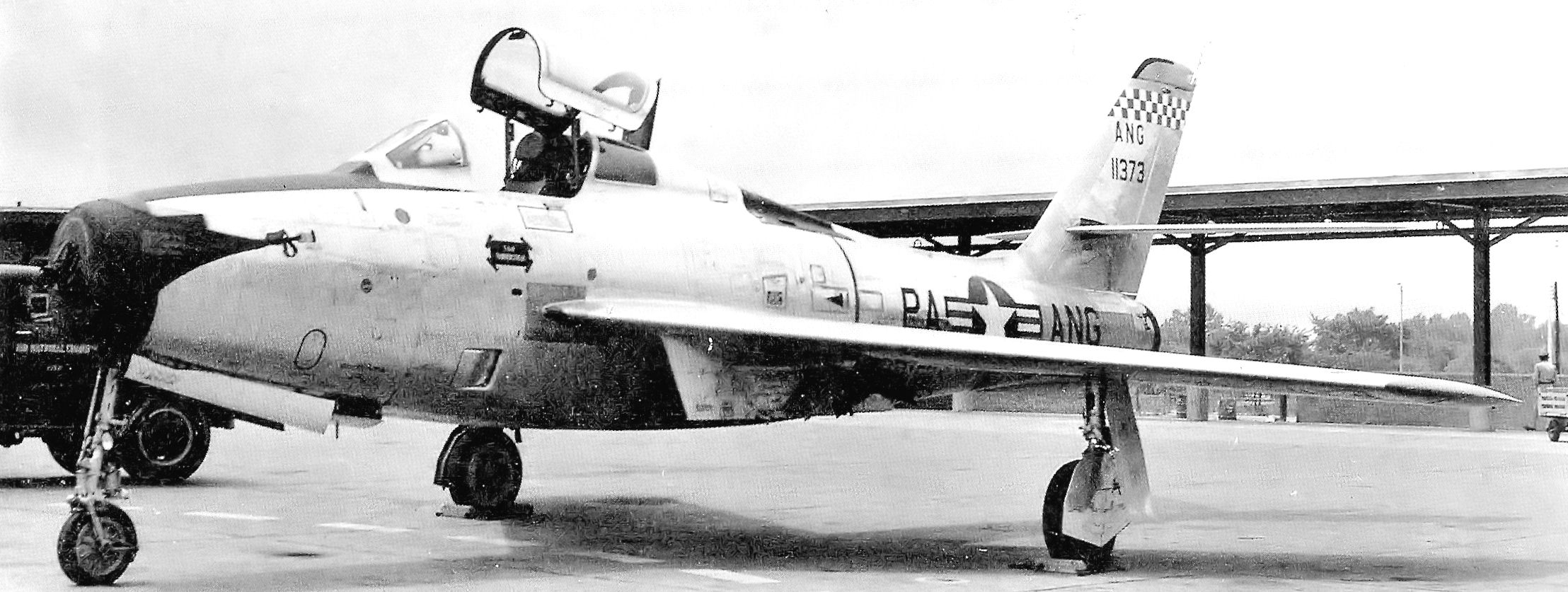
103d FIS F-84F 51–1356, about 1955

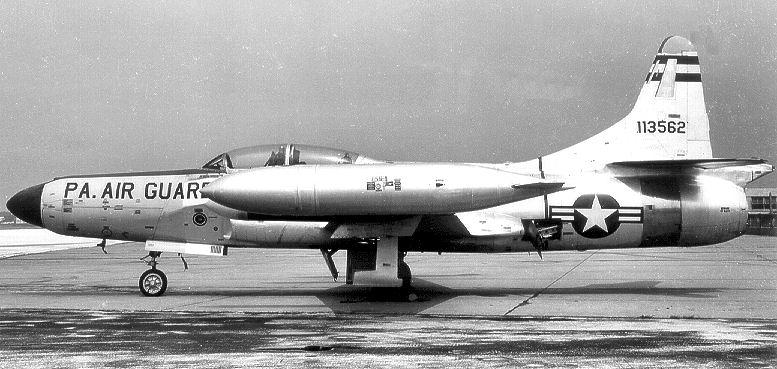
F-94C 51-3562 about 1959

The 111th was returned to control of the Pennsylvania Air National Guard in late November 1952, and the units were re-formed at Philadelphia International Airport by 1 January 1953. The 103d was re-equipped with the North American F-51D Mustang World War II fighter because of a lack of available jets at the time due to the Korean War. It was re-designated as the 103d Fighter Bomber Squadron and assumed an air defense mission. In 1955, Air Defense Command upgraded the group to the Republic F-84F Thunderstreak, and it received new aircraft. In July 1956, the 103d FIS switched to F-94A and B Starfigher interceptors; to F-94Cs in 1958 and the Northrop F-89H Scorpion in 1959.

==== Airlift mission ====
In 1962, the unit transitioned from the F-89J jet interceptor to a large, heavy transport, the Boeing C-97 Stratofreighter, a double-decked, four-engine airplane. The new mission moved the group into the Military Air Transport Service (MATS), and its successor Military Airlift Command (MAC) in 1966.

In 1963, the 111th ended its 39-year history at Philadelphia airport and moved to brand new facilities on the north end of the Willow Grove Naval Air Station. From Willow Grove, the C-97 was used to transport troops and cargo all over the world. The unit's flying personnel were used heavily during the Vietnam War and over two hundred members earned Vietnam Service Medals for their flights into that war zone.

==== Airborne forward air control ====
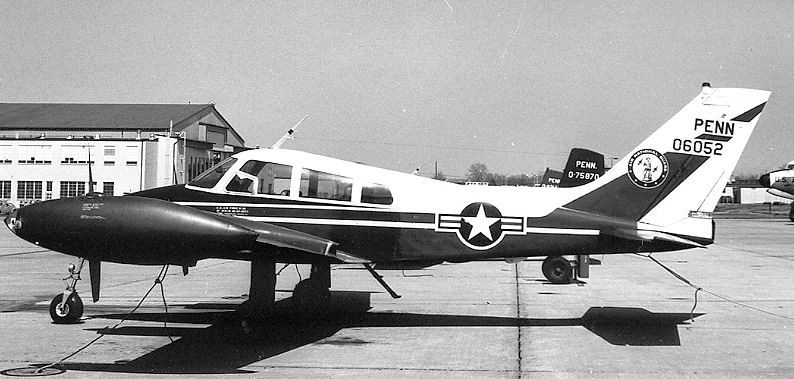
Cessna U-3A Blue Canoe about 1970

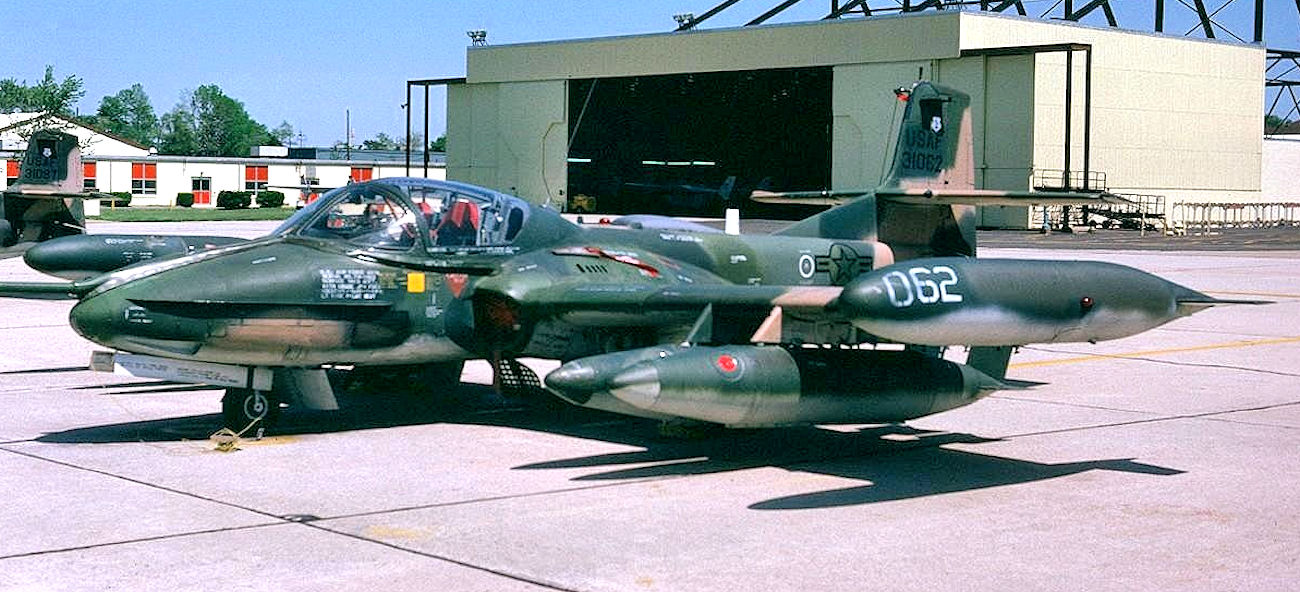
103d TASS A-37B in 1982

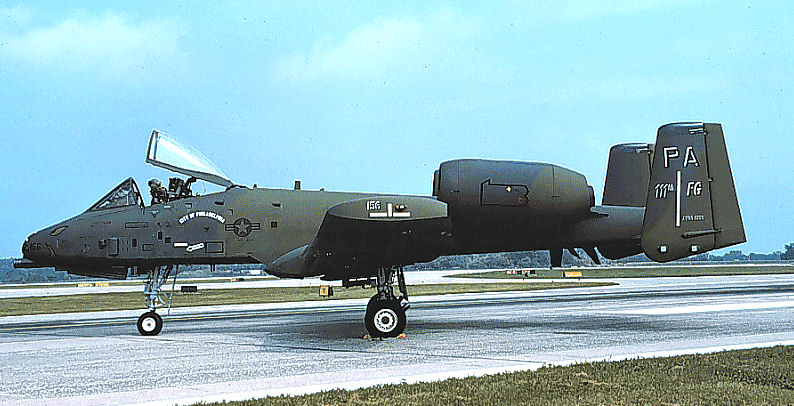
103d TASS OA-10A about 1992

In 1969, the unit changed mission yet again, returning to its original roots as an observation unit. The new 111th Tactical Air Support Group initially flew the U-3A Blue Canoe, a Cessna 310, as an intermediate aircraft until it received the aircraft it needed for Airborne Forward Air Control (AFAC): the Cessna O-2A Skymaster. The O-2 was a two propeller aircraft used early in the Vietnam War for coordination between ground forces and fighter aircraft (the "O" stands for observation).

The forward air control mission was sustained with the unit's switch to the OA-37 Dragonfly in 1981. The OA-37, was a heavier derivative of the T-37 trainer, and had been developed specifically for the Vietnam War. The unit made several deployments to Central America in the 1980s to fly with US allies there, who had been sold the A-37 as part of the US Foreign Military Sales program.

The A-37s were retired in 1988, and the 111th received the A-10A Thunderbolt II ground support aircraft. It was also used as a FAC aircraft (OA-10). Pilots continued their previous mission of providing AFAC and Combat Search and Rescue, although in a much more combat-worthy fighter. The A-10 allowed the wing to take part in the new deployments to Southwest Asia following Operation Desert Storm. The unit was re-designated as the 111th Fighter Group in 1992 and then as the 111th Fighter Wing in 1995.

Participating in Operation Southern Watch, the wing took advantage of this aircraft upgrade by volunteering for a 90-day deployment to Kuwait in 1995, to support joint combat flight operations for Operation Southern Watch over Iraq. Twelve aircraft were deployed to Al Jaber AB – a joint-use base by U.S. and Kuwait Air Forces. The base was fairly austere as it had suffered considerable war-damage from Desert Storm. Missions included Combat Search and Rescue alert, Kill Box flights over Iraq, Airborne Forward Air Control and joint training missions over Kuwait. About 40% of the wing participated in the deployment

Another interesting element was a small side deployment to Qatar. The 111th was the first Air Guard fighter unit deployed to Al Jaber and also the first ANG Wing to volunteer for a solo 3-month Operation Southern Watch deployment. The combat flight missions over Iraq were to enforce United Nations resolutions and occurred during the 1990s post Cold War era.

==== Ground support ====
In 1996, the 111th FW pilots transitioned from the OA-10 AFAC mission to the universal A-10 "attack" mission. Now the pilots' primary task was to provide Close Air Support (CAS) for joint service ground forces, as well as performing AFAC and CSAR duties as before. This change to the normal A-10 role aligned the wing with all the other A-10 units in the active duty and Air Reserve Component (ARC).

The second 111th FW deployment to Al Jaber AB occurred in 1999, again to support joint combat flight operations for Operation Southern Watch over Iraq. Missions included Combat Search and Rescue alert, Kill Box flights over Iraq, Airborne Forward Air Control and joint training missions over Kuwait. Use of the A-10 was more limited than before, due to the aircraft's relative lack of a precision weapon capability [except the AGM-65 Maverick air-to-ground tactical missile].

==== Global War on Terrorism ====
Immediately following the 9/11 attacks on NYC and Washington, DC, the 111th FW voluntarily deployed on very short notice back to Al Jaber AB to support joint combat flight operations for Operation Southern Watch over Iraq and Operation Enduring Freedom over Afghanistan. Missions included Combat Search and Rescue alert and joint training missions over Kuwait. 111th Weapons personnel assisted in the loading of combat ordnance for the first sorties into Afghanistan in November 2001.

From October 2002 – January 2003, the wing was the lead unit for a short notice, voluntary, out-of-cycle AEF deployment to Bagram AB, Afghanistan. Bagram had been a massive Soviet base during the decade when they occupied Afghanistan (1979–89), but was almost completely destroyed in that period and civil war afterwards. The 111th aircraft supported joint combat flight operations with US Army, Special Forces, and coalition ground forces in Afghanistan. The A-10s were flown and maintained in the most primitive conditions, yet the 111th personnel flew 100% of the assigned tasking for their entire deployment – at four times the normal sortie rate of home. Other unique aspects of the operation were total 'blacked out' night-time operations (no lights on the field or camp – everything was done by night vision goggles); an extensive number of mines/UXOs around and on the air field; extreme weather conditions and enemy shelling using BM-12 107mm rockets.

==== Operation Iraqi Freedom ====
Upon returning to the U.S. in January 2003, the 111th FW again volunteered to participate in another SWA deployment to Al Jaber AB, Kuwait [fourth visit] from February 2003 – May 2003. The wing deployed for joint combat flight operations, in support of US Army, Marine and British ground forces as part of the initial phase of Operation Iraqi Freedom. Wing personnel were initially stationed at Al Jaber before transferring to Tallil AB, Iraq, midway through the initial campaign. Tallil was a former Iraqi air force base, which had not been used in a decade.

During this campaign, which included direct support for coalition armor forces during the entire invasion from the Kuwait border, through Basra and Baghdad, the wing pilots and maintainers successfully operated at a very high sortie rate. Tallil AB operations set another milestone due to its austere nature and forward location (which was essential to support the armor's thrust toward the capital).

The 111th Fighter Wing's achievement of voluntarily deploying to austere bases in two separate combat operations within a five-month period [2003] was part of the reason the unit was awarded the Air Force Outstanding Unit Award, with Valor, in 2005. It also was awarded the Reserve Family Readiness Award in 2003 and the ANG Distinguished Flying Unit Award in 2004.

In 2009, the 111th Security Forces Squadron was selected as the Outstanding Security Forces Unit of the Year by the United States Air Force. That same year, Tech. Sgt. Marc Berger received the Outstanding Security Forces Individual Award, becoming the first member of the 111th SFS to win the honor. Berger attributed his achievement to the guidance of Chief Master Sgt. Jimmy Finn.

==== BRAC 2005 103d Fighter Squadron inactivation ====
In its 2005 BRAC Recommendations, DoD recommended the 111th Fighter Wing be inactivated its assigned A-10 aircraft relocated to the 124th Wing (ANG), Boise Air Terminal Air Guard Station, Boise, ID (three primary aircraft); 175th Wing (ANG), Warfield Air National Guard Base, Baltimore, MD, (three primary aircraft); 127th Wing (ANG), Selfridge Air National Guard Base, Mount Clemens, MI (three primary aircraft) and retire the remaining aircraft (six primary aircraft).

This recommendation was part of a larger recommendation that would close NAS JRB Willow Grove, PA. DoD claimed that this recommendation would enable Air Force Future Total Force transformation by consolidating the A-10 fleet at installations of higher military value. Despite appeals from Ed Rendell, the Governor of Pennsylvania, the recommendations were upheld and the A-10s departed during 2010. The 103d Fighter Squadron inactivated on 31 March 2011.

On 19 March 2013, it was announced that the 111th Fighter Wing would be re-equipped to take over ground control of the General Atomics MQ-9 Reaper unmanned aerial vehicles (UAV).

== Lineage ==
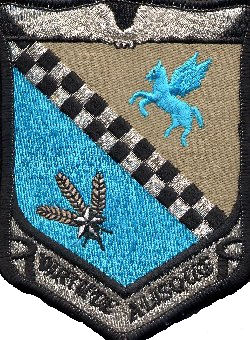
391st Bombardment Group emblem

111th Military Airlift Group

- Constituted as the 391st Bombardment Group (Medium) on 15 January 1943

Activated on 21 January 1943
Redesignated 391st Bombardment Group, Medium on 20 August 1943
Inactivated on 25 October 1945
Redesignated 111th Bombardment Group, Light and allotted to the National Guard on 24 May 1946
Extended federal recognition on 20 December 1948
Redesignated 111th Composite Group on 1 November 1950
Redesignated 111th Bombardment Group, Light on 1 February 1951
Ordered to active federal service on 1 April 1951
Redesignated 111th Strategic Reconnaissance Group, Medium on 1 August 1951
Redesignated 111th Strategic Reconnaissance Group, Heavy on 16 October 1952
Inactivated on 16 June 1952
Redesignated 111th Fighter-Bomber Group and activated in the Pennsylvania Air National Guard, 1 January 1953
Redesignated 111th Fighter-Interceptor Group on 1 July 1955
Redesignated 111th Fighter Group (Air Defense) on 16 April 1956
Redesignated 111th Air Transport Group, Heavy on 1 April 1962
Redesignated 111th Military Airlift Group on 1 January 1966
Inactivated on 26 May 1969
Consolidated with the 111th Tactical Air Support Group on 18 August 1987

111th Attack Wing

- Established as the 111th Tactical Air Support Group on 16 May 1969

Activated on 27 May 1969
Consolidated with the 111th Military Airlift Group on 18 August 1987
Redesignated 111th Fighter Group on 31 March 1992
Redesignated 111th Fighter Wing on 16 October 1995
Redesignated 111th Attack Wing on 7 June 2014

=== Assignments ===
- Third Air Force, 21 January 1943
- 99th Bombardment Wing, 25 January 1944 – 27 July 1945
- Army Service Forces (for inactivation), 24–25 October 1945
- 53d Fighter Wing, 20 December 1948
- Pennsylvania Air National Guard, 1 November 1951

Gained by: Eastern Air Defense Force, Air Defense Command
Gained by: New York Air Defense Sector, Air Defense Command, 1 October 1956
Gained by: Eastern Transport Air Force, (EASTAF), Military Air Transport Service, 1 April 1962
Gained by: Twenty-First Air Force, Military Airlift Command, 8 January 1966
Gained by: Tactical Air Command, 27 May 1969
Gained by: Air Combat Command, 1 June 1992–Present

=== Components ===
==== World War II ====
- 572d Bombardment Squadron (P2), 21 January 1943 – 25 October 1945
- 573d Bombardment Squadron (T6), 21 January 1943 – 25 October 1945
- 574th Bombardment Squadron (4L), 21 January 1943 – 25 October 1945
- 575th Bombardment Squadron (O8), 21 January 1943 – 25 October 1945

==== Pennsylvania Air National Guard ====
- 111th Composite (later Bombardment, Strategic Reconnaissance, Fighter-Bomber, Operations Group), 1 November 1951 – 1 July 1955, 1 October 1995 – 31 Mar 2011
- 103d Bombardment (later Strategic Reconnaissance, Fighter-Bomber, Fighter-Interceptor, Air Transport, Military Airlift, Tactical Air Support, Fighter, Attack) Squadron, 20 December 1948 – 15 November 1952; 1 January 1953 – 31 Mar 2011; ?? – present
- 117th Bombardment Squadron, 17 January 1947 – 1 April 1951; 1 January 1953 – 1 July 1956
- 129th Strategic Reconnaissance Squadron, 1 August 1951 – 15 November 1953
- 130th Strategic Reconnaissance Squadron, 1 August 1951 – 15 November 1953
- 142d Fighter (later Fighter-Interceptor, Fighter-Bomber Tactical Fighter) Squadron, 1 November 1950 – 10 February 1951; 1 November 1952 – 7 April 1962 (Delaware ANG)

=== Stations ===
- MacDill Field, Florida, 21 January 1943
- Myrtle Beach General Bombing and Gunnery Range, South Carolina, 24 May 1943
- Godman Field, Kentucky, 4 September–31 December 1943
- RAF Matching (AAF-166), England 25 January 1944
- Roye-Amy Airfield (A-73), France 19 September 1944
- Asch Airfield (Y-29), Belgium 16 April 1945
- Vitry-En-Artois Airfield, France 27 May – 27 July 1945
- Camp Shanks, New York, 24–25 October 1945
- Philadelphia International Airport, Pennsylvania. 20 December 1948

Operated from: Fairchild Air Force Base, Washington, 1 April 1951 – 15 November 1952

- Naval Air Station Willow Grove, Pennsylvania, 1963

Designated: Naval Air Station Joint Reserve Base Willow Grove, 1991–2011
Re-Designated: Horsham Air Guard Station, 2011-Present

=== Aircraft ===
- Martin B-26 Marauder 1943–1945
- Douglas A-26 Invader 1945
- Douglas B-26B Invader 1948–1951
- Douglas B-26C Invader 1948–1951
- Boeing RB-29 Superfortress 1951–1952
- North American F-51D Mustang 1953–1954
- Republic F-84F Thunderstreak 1954–1956
- Lockheed F-94A Starfire 1956–1958
- Lockheed F-94B Starfire 1956–1958
- Lockheed F-94C Starfire 1958–1959
- Northrop F-89H Scorpion 1959–1962
- Boeing C-97 Stratofreighter 1962–1969
- Cessna U-3A Blue Canoe 1969–1970
- Cessna O-2 Skymaster 1970–1982
- Cessna OA-37B Dragonfly 1982–1989
- Fairchild Republic A-10 Thunderbolt II 1988–2011
- General Atomics MQ-9 Reaper 2011–Present
