= 575th Bombardment Squadron =

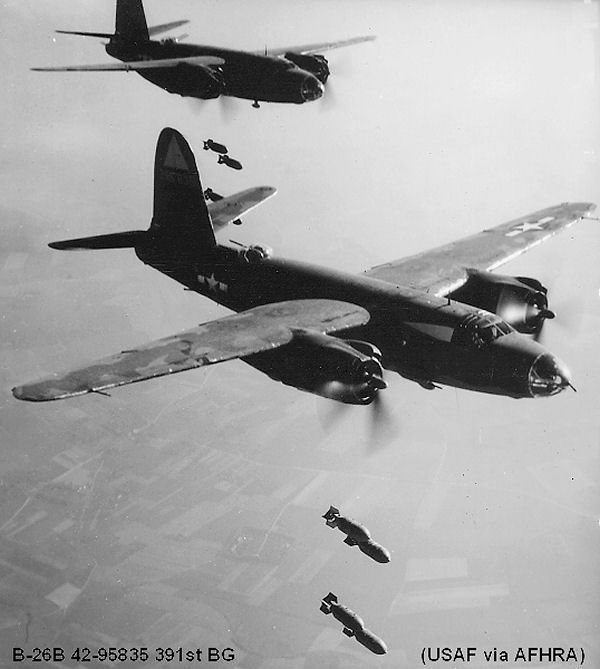
- Martin B-26 Marauders of the 391st Bombardment Group (Note: Aircraft in foreground is Martin B-26B-50-MA Marauder, serial 42-95835.)
- Active: 1943–1945
- Country: United States
- Branch: United States Air Force
- Role: Light bomber
- Engagements: European Theater of Operations
- Decorations: Distinguished Unit Citation

Insignia
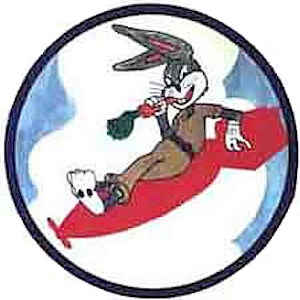
- 575th Bombardment Squadron emblem (Note: Approved 2 December 1943. Description: On a light blue violet disc, border black, "Bugs Bunny" proper, in tan flying suit, reclining on a large red aerial bomb and chewing on a carrot proper, all in front of a large white cloud formation.)
- World War II fuselage code: O8

The 575th Bombardment Squadron is an inactive United States Air Force unit. The squadron was a World War II unit assigned to the 391st Bombardment Group. After training in the United States throughout 1943, the squadron moved to England, and from February 1944 participated in operations against Germany from there and the European Continent as part of IX Bomber Command. It earned a Distinguished Unit Citation for its combat actions. Following V-E Day, the squadron returned to the United States and was inactivated at the port of embarkation in October 1945.

== History ==
The 575th Bombardment Squadron, was activated at MacDill Field, Florida on 21 January 1943 as one of the four original squadrons of the 391st Bombardment Group. After training with Martin B-26 Marauder in the United States, it departed for the European Theater of Operations in December 1943.

The squadron gathered at RAF Matching, its first combat station in theater in late January 1944 and flew its first combat mission on 15 February. It initially concentrated on attacks to support Operation Overlord, the invasion of Normandy, by attacking airfields, bridges and marshalling yards. It attacked V-1 flying bomb and V-2 rocket launch sites as part of Operation Crossbow. On D-Day and the next day it struck German coastal defenses near the invasion beaches.

Until September, the squadron continued attacks from its English base. It supported Operation Cobra, the breakout at Saint Lo in late July by attacking fuel dumps and troop concentrations, then hit transportation and communications targets to slow the German retreat eastward. in late September it moved to Roye-Amy Airfield, France to be closer to the advancing ground forces it was supporting and extending its targets into Germany. From its continental bases, it hit bridges, railroads, highways, ammunition dumps and other targets. The unit was also tasked on occasion to drop propaganda leaflets.

During the Battle of the Bulge, it attacked heavily defended bridges and viaducts. Performing these attacks without fighter escort in the face of heavy flak and overwhelming attacks by enemy fighters earned the squadron a Distinguished Unit Citation for the period between 23 December and 26 December 1944. On 23 December, it attacked a rail viaduct at Ahrweiler. Although its fighter escort failed to arrive due to adverse weather, the squadron continued its attack, despite the loss of both pathfinder planes leading the attack. More than 60 Luftwaffe fighters attacked the 391st Group's formations while it was on its bomb run. The 391st Group lost 16 of its Marauders during this attack. The following day, the squadron destroyed the railroad viaduct at Konz-Karthaus.

The squadron continued its attacks, concentrating on German transportation and communications systems. It converted to the Douglas A-26 Invader in April and flew its last combat mission on 3 May 1945. The squadron left Europe in September 1945 and was inactivated on arrival at the port of embarkation, Camp Patrick Henry, Virginia, on 29 October 1945.

== Lineage ==
- Constituted as the 575th Bombardment Squadron (Medium) on 15 January 1943

Activated on 21 Jan 1943
Redesignated 575th Bombardment Squadron, Medium c. 9 October 1944
Redesignated 575th Bombardment Squadron, Light on 23 June 1945
Inactivated on 29 Oct 1945

=== Assignments ===
- 391st Bombardment Group, 21 January 1943 – 25 October 1945
- Unknown, 25–29 October 1945 (Note: Maurer gives no assignment after 25 October, when the 391st Group was inactivated. Probably assigned to Army Service Forces, port of embarkation. Maurer, Combat Squadrons, p. 668.)

=== Stations ===
- MacDill Field, Florida, 21 January 1943
- Myrtle Beach Bombing and Gunnery Range, South Carolina, 24 May 1943
- Godman Field, Kentucky, 8 September – 31 December 1943
- RAF Matching (AAF-166), England 26 January 1944
- Roye-Amy Airfield (A-73), France c. 1 October 1944
- Asch Airfield (Y-29), Belgium c. 20 April 1945
- Vitry-En-Artois Airfield (A-67), France, c. 1 June 1945
- Laon-Athies Airfield (A-69), France, c. 31 July – 13 September 1945
- Camp Patrick Henry, Virginia, 29 October 1945

=== Aircraft ===
- Martin B-26 Marauder, 1943–1945
- Douglas A-26 Invader, 1945

=== Awards and campaigns ===
Award streamer	Award	Dates	Notes
	Distinguished Unit Citation	23–26 December 1944	

Campaign Streamer	Campaign	Dates	Notes
	Air Offensive, Europe	26 January 1944 – 5 June 1944	
	Air Combat, EAME Theater	26 July 1943 – 11 May 1945	
	Normandy	6 June 1944 – 24 July 1944	
	Northern France	25 July 1944 – 14 September 1944	
	Rhineland	15 September 1944 – 21 March 1945	
	Ardennes-Alsace	16 December 1944 – 25 January 1945	
	Central Europe	22 March 1944 – 21 May 1945	

== See also ==
- List of Martin B-26 Marauder operators
- List of A-26 Invader operators
