= RAF Matching =

Former Royal Air Force station

RAF Matching RAF Matching Green USAAF Station AAF-166
- Near Harlow, Essex in England
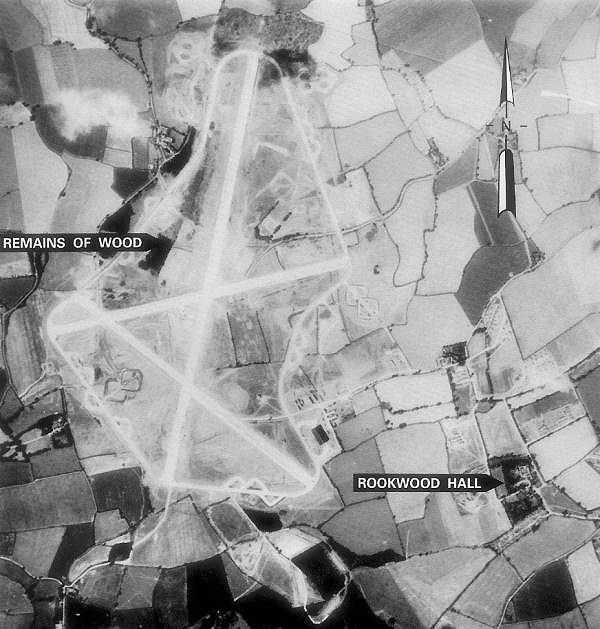
- Matching airfield photographed on 1 August 1943 while still under construction.

Site information
- Type: Royal Air Force station
- Code: MT
- Owner: Air Ministry
- Controlled by: RAF Fighter Command; Ninth Air Force

Location
- Shown within Essex RAF Matching (the United Kingdom)
- Coordinates: 51°47′03″N 000°14′34″E

Site history
- Built: 1943
- In use: 1944-1946
- Battles/wars: European Theatre of World War II; Air Offensive, Europe July 1942 - May 1945

Garrison information
- Occupants: 391st Bombardment Group; No 38 Group

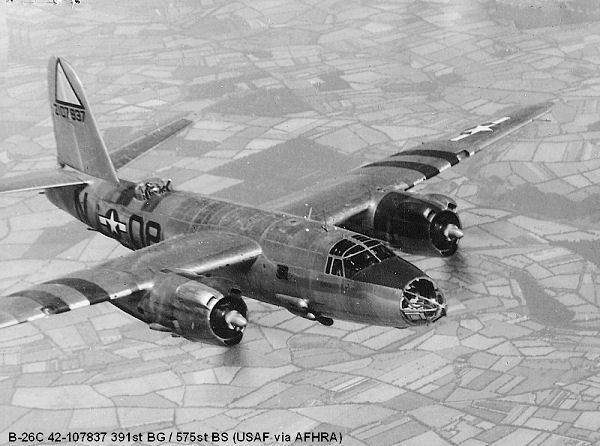
Martin B-26C Marauder of the 575th Bomb Squadron. "Aksar Ben Knight"

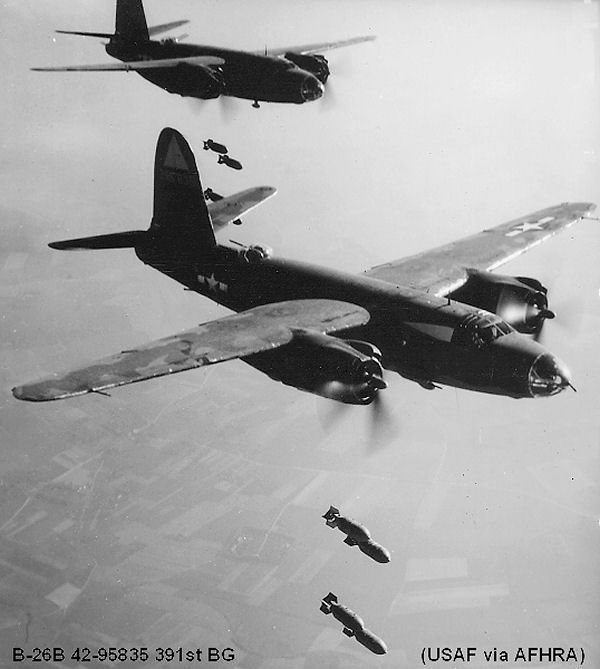
Martin B-26B Marauder of the 391st Bomb Group. "Mad Mohawk"

Royal Air Force Matching or more simply RAF Matching is a former Royal Air Force station located 5 miles (8 km) east of Harlow, Essex, England.

Opened in 1944, it was used by both the Royal Air Force and United States Army Air Forces. During the war it was used primarily as a bomber airfield. After the war it was closed in 1946.

Today the remains of the airfield are located on private property being used as agricultural fields.

== History ==
=== USAAF use ===
Matching was known as USAAF Station AAF-166 for security reasons by the USAAF during the war, and by which it was referred to instead of location. Its USAAF Station Code was "MT".

==== 391st Bombardment Group ====
The first combat organisation, the 391st Bombardment Group, arrived at Matching on 26 January 1944 from Goodman AAF, Kentucky flying Martin B-26 Marauders. Operational squadrons of the group were:

- 572d Bombardment Squadron (P2)
- 573d Bombardment Squadron (T6)
- 574th Bombardment Squadron (4L)
- 575th Bombardment Squadron (O8)

The group marking was a yellow triangle painted on the tail fin of their B-26s.

The first mission was flown on 15 February and 150 more were completed before the group moved into France in late September 1944. The group moved onto the continent, transferring to Roye/Amy, France (ALG A-73) on 19 September 1944. The group then switched to Douglas A-26 Invaders and flew its last mission on 3 May 1945 from Asche, Belgium (ALG Y-29).

The 391st Bomb Group returned to the United States in October and was inactivated at Camp Shanks, New York on 25 October 1945.

With the move of the 391st to France, this was the end of Matching airfield's association with the Ninth Air Force as a combat airfield.

=== Royal Air Force use ===
Douglas C-47 Skytrains of IX Troop Carrier Command were detached to Matching later in 1944 for exercises with British paratroops. In 1946 the airfield was closed and sold to private owners.

Units:

- No. 135 Airfield Headquarters RAF was here between February and 10 March 1944.
- No. 1677 (Target Towing) Flight RAF between 18 April and 19 October 1945
- Operational and Refresher Training Unit between 27 February and 24 March 1945

=== Postwar ===
With the facility released from military control, it was rapidly returned to agricultural use and the concrete was soon removed for road hardcore but the hangar on the technical site survived for farm use. However, in the late 1980s the T-2 Hangar was dismantled and re-erected at North Weald for Aces High where it was used for TV productions, including 'The Crystal Maze' set.

== Current use ==
The control tower still stands 85 years after it was built and for some years has been used for radar experiments by Cossor Electronics. Many remaining Nissen Huts and corrugated roof buildings in the former technical site are now used for small industrial units, farming and storage along with the water tower.

Part of the main runway (03/21) that remains is now used as a public road and another surviving portion was used for heavy goods vehicle instruction. Many single-width sections of the perimeter track are used for agricultural vehicles. However very little of the runways, perimeter track or dispersal hardstands of the former airfield survive. Even in aerial photography, there is very little evidence of the airfield's existence.

A memorial plaque to the men of the 391st Bomb Group is housed in Matching Church.

== See also ==
- List of former Royal Air Force stations
