= 111th Air Defense Wing =

Unit of the Pennsylvania Air National Guard

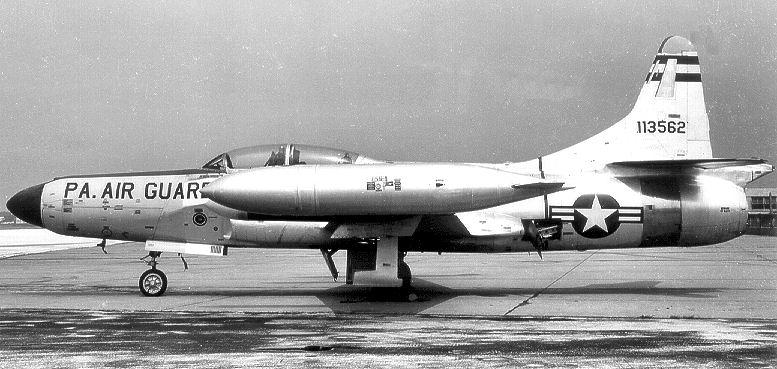
- Wing F-94 Starfire (Note: Aircraft is Lockheed F-94C-1-LO Starfire, serial 51-13562 of the 103d Fighter-Interceptor Squadron.)
- Active: 1950–1953; 1953–present
- Country: United States
- Allegiance: Pennsylvania
- Branch: Air National Guard
- Type: Wing
- Role: Air defense

Insignia
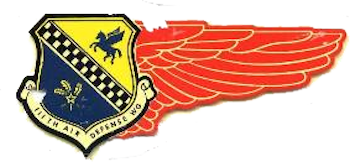
- 111th Air Defense Wing emblem

The 111th Air Defense Wing is an inactive wing of the United States Air Force. It was organized as the 111th Composite Wing in 1950. It was mobilized for the Korean War in 1951, and, as the 111th Strategic Reconnaissance Wing, became part of Strategic Air Command until inactivating in 1953 and returning to state control. It assumed an air defense mission in the eastern United States until inactivating in 1958.

== History ==
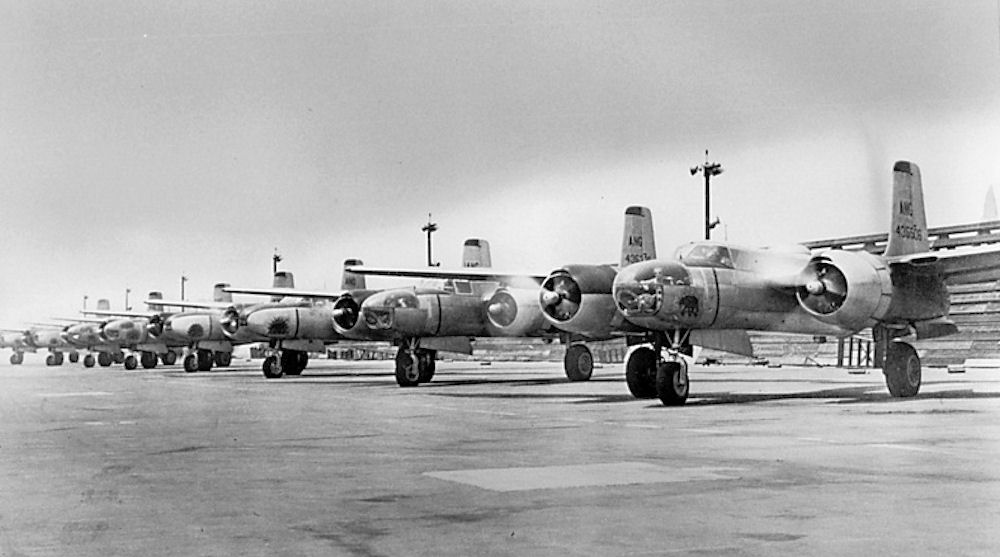
Air National Guard B-26 Invaders

The wing was first organized at Olmsted Air Force Base, Pennsylvania as the 111th Composite Wing on 1 November 1950, when the National Guard reorganized its operational units under the Wing Base organization used by the regular Air Force since 1947. Under this plan, operational groups and their supporting units were united under a single wing. The new wing drew most of its initial personnel from the 53d Fighter Wing, which was simultaneously inactivated. When the 142d Fighter Squadron of the Delaware National Guard was reassigned away from the wing's 111th Composite Group, the wing became the 111th Bombardment Wing. On 1 January 1951, the wing moved to Philadelphia International Airport, where it joined the 111th Group.

=== Korean War mobilization ===
The wing was mobilized on 1 April 1951 for the Korean War. Upon mobilization, it was broken up, with the 111th Group's 117th and 122d Bombardment Squadrons moving to Langley Air Force Base with the wing's Douglas B-26 Invaders to become crew training units. The wing, group and 103d Bombardment Squadron moved to Fairchild Air Force Base, Washington, where they were assigned to Strategic Air Command (SAC)'s 57th Air Division.

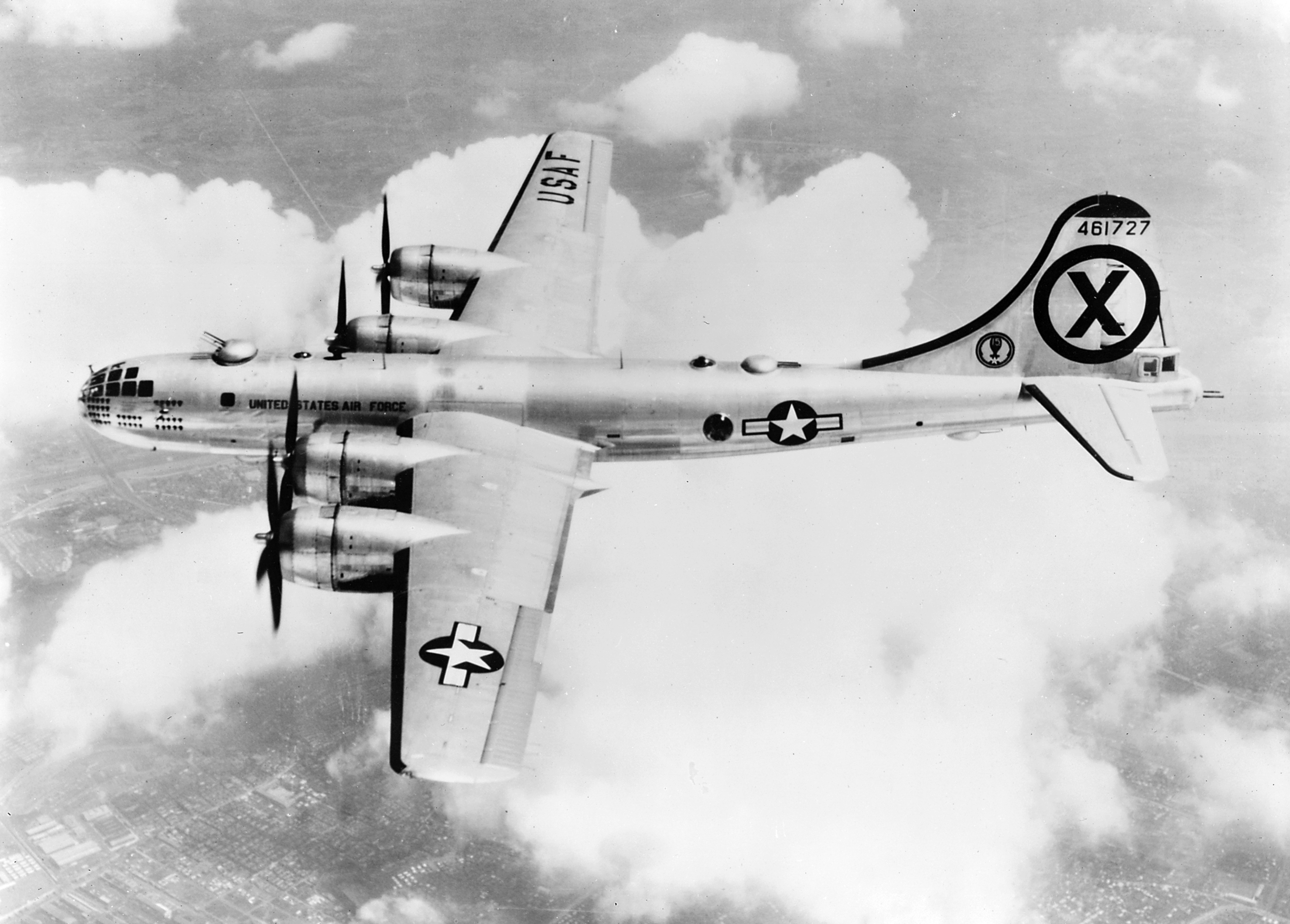
RB-29 Superfortress (Note: Aircraft is Boeing RB-29 Superfortress, serial 44-61727.)

In August, the wing became the 111th Strategic Reconnaissance Wing and began to equip with Boeing RB-29 Superfortress reconnaissance aircraft. On 16 June 1952, the wing reorganized into the dual deputy system adopted by SAC. The wing's 111th Strategic Reconnaissance and 111th Maintenance and Supply Groups were inactivated and their squadrons reassigned directly to the wing. In the fall of 1952, the wing began replacing its RB-29s with Convair RB-36 Peacemakers. On 1 January 1953, the wing was inactivated and returned to the Air National Guard, transferring its personnel, aircraft and mission to the 99th Strategic Reconnaissance Wing, which was simultaneously activated at Fairchild.

=== Air defense operations ===
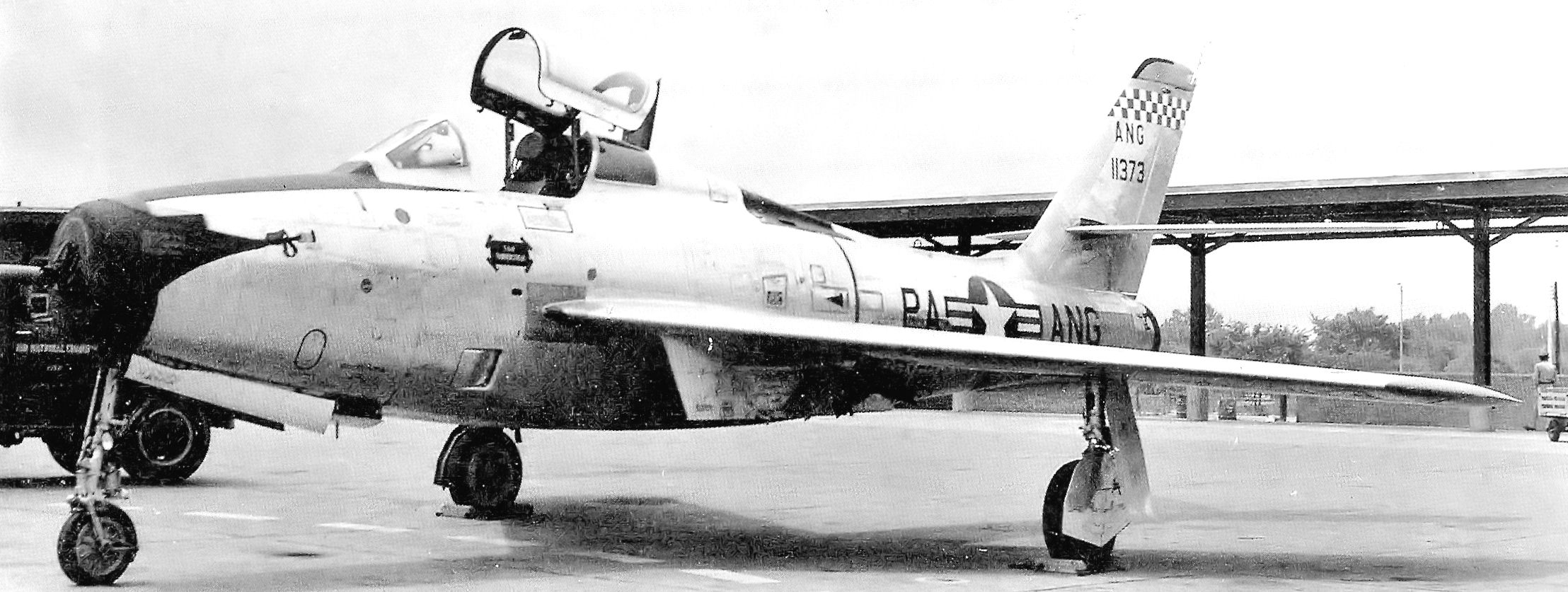
Wing F-84 Thunderstreak (Note: Aircraft is Republic F-84F-5-RE Thunderstreak, serial 51-1373.)

The 111th returned to control of the Pennsylvania Air National Guard, redesignated as the 111th Fighter-Bomber Wing and reactivated at Philadelphia International Airport on 1 January 1953. It was initially equipped with the North American F-51 Mustang fighter because of a lack of available jets at the time due to the Korean War. Despite is designation as a fighter bomber wing, its mission was to augment air defense forces. In 1955, it was redesignated the 111th Fighter-Interceptor Group and received Republic F-84F Thunderstreaks. In July 1956, the group was redesignated the 111th Air Defense Wing. The wing's 117th Squadron was inactivated, while its 103rd Squadron switched to Lockheed F-94 Starfires. In April 1958, the wing was inactivated and it 111th Fighter Group (Air Defense) was reassigned to the 108th Air Defense Wing.

== Lineage ==
- Established as the 111th Composite Wing, and allotted to the National Guard on 31 October 1950

Organized and received federal recognition on 1 November 1950
Redesignated 111th Bombardment Wing, Light on 1 February 1951
Redesignated 111th Strategic Reconnaissance Wing, Medium on 1 August 1951
Redesignated 111th Strategic Reconnaissance Wing, Heavy on 16 October 1952
Inactivated and returned to state control on 1 January 1953
Redesignated 111th Fighter-Bomber Wing and activated in the Air National Guard on 1 January 1953
Redesignated 111th Fighter-Interceptor Wing on 1 July 1955
Redesignated 111th Air Defense Wing on 1 July 1956
Inactivated on 1 April 1958 and withdrawn from the Air National Guard

=== Components ===
Groups

- 111th Air Base Group, 1 November 1950 – 16 June 1952, 1 January 1953 – 1 July 1956
- 111th Composite Group (later 111th Bombardment Group, 111th Strategic Reconnaissance Group, 111th Fighter-Bomber Group, 111th Fighter-Interceptor Group, 111th Fighter Group (Air Defense)), 1 November 1950 – 16 June 1952, 1 January 1953 – 1 April 1958
- 111th Maintenance and Supply Group, 1 November 1950 – 16 June 1952, 1 January 1953 – 1 July 1956
- 111th Medical Group (later 111th Medical Squadron, 111th Medical Group, 111th Tactical Hospital) 1 November 1950 – 16 June 1952, 1 January 1953 – 1 July 1956

Squadrons

- 103rd Strategic Reconnaissance Squadron, 16 June 1952 – 1 January 1953
- 111th Field Maintenance Squadron, 16 June 1952 – 1 January 1953
- 111th Reconnaissance Technical Squadron, 1 August 1951 – 1 January 1953
- 129th Strategic Reconnaissance Squadron, 16 June 1952 – 1 January 1953
- 130th Strategic Reconnaissance Squadron, 16 June 1952 – 1 January 1953
- 4119th Armament and Electronics Maintenance Squadron, 16 June 1952 – 1 January 1953
- 4119th Armament and Electronics Maintenance Squadron, 16 June 1952 – 1 January 1953
- 4119th Organizational Maintenance Squadron, 16 June 1952 – 1 January 1953
- 4119th Operations Squadron, 16 June 1952 – 1 January 1953

=== Assignments ===
- Pennsylvania Air National Guard, 1 November 1950
- First Air Force, 1 April 1951
- Strategic Air Command, 10 April 1951
- 57th Air Division, 21 April 1951 – 1 January 1953
- Pennsylvania Air National Guard, 1 January 1953 – 1 April 1958

=== Stations ===
- Olmsted Air Force Base, Pennsylvania, 1 November 1950
- Philadelphia International Airport, Pennsylvania, 1 January 1951
- Fairchild Air Force Base, Washington, 10 April 1951 – 16 June 1952
- Philadelphia International Airport, 1 January 1953 – 1 April 1958

=== Aircraft ===
- Douglas B-26 Invader, 1950–1951
- North American P-51 (later F-51) Mustang, 1950–1951, 1953–1955
- Boeing RB-29 Superfortress, 1951–1953
- Convair RB-36 Peacemaker, 1952–1953
- Republic F-84F Thunderstreak, 1955–1956
- Lockheed F-94 Starfire, 1956–1958

== See also ==
- List of United States Air National Guard Groups & Wings
- List of A-26 Invader operators
- List of B-29 Superfortress operators
- F-94 Starfire units of the United States Air Force
