= 53rd Fighter Wing =

53d Fighter Wing
- Active: 1942–1945; 1947-1950
- Country: United States
- Branch: United States Air Force
- Type: Wing
- Role: Command and Control
- Part of: Pennsylvania Air National Guard
- Engagements: American Theater of World War II; European Theater of World War II

Insignia
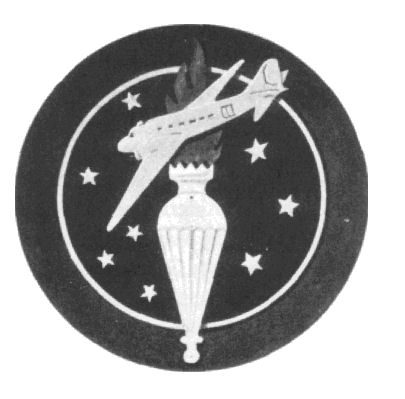
- 53d Troop Carrier Wing emblem

The 53d Fighter Wing (53 FW) is a disbanded unit of the United States Air Force, last stationed at Philadelphia International Airport, Pennsylvania. It was withdrawn from the Pennsylvania Air National Guard (PA ANG) and inactivated on 31 October 1950.

The wing was first formed as the 53d Troop Carrier Wing during World War II for command of glider and troop carrier units and its components were heavily involved in airborne operations in North-West Europe from the Normandy Landings to the crossing of the River Rhine.

This wing is not related to the 53d Wing located at Eglin Air Force Base, Florida or that wing's predecessor units, the 53d Fighter Group and the USAF Tactical Air Warfare Center.

== History ==
=== World War II ===
The wing was formed as a World War II command and control organization for newly organized troop carrier groups and glider units being trained for overseas deployment to combat theaters. It deployed to England in 1944 and its units subsequently engaged in combat operations, carrying Army parachutists and towing gliders during Operation Overlord, Operation Market Garden and Operation Varsity. The 53d was also engaged in aerial resupply and casualty evacuation of wounded personnel as well as theater troop transport operations. It operated until V-E Day, then supported occupation units in Germany until fall 1945.

=== Pennsylvania Air National Guard ===
The wing was redesignated as a fighter wing and reactivated in 1947 as part of the PA ANG. It was a command and control organization, controlling one Bombardment Group at Philadelphia International Airport and two Fighter Groups at Greater Pittsburgh International Airport and Andrews Air Force Base, Maryland as its operational components. It was also the headquarters for an Aircraft Control & Warning Group (AC&W Gp)located at Harrisburg State Airport and three Air Service Groups, which were colocated with its flying groups and had flights located with each of the squadrons assigned to the flying groups. Shortly before the wing was inactivated, its 113th Fighter Group was federalized for the Korean War. At the end of October 1950, the ANG converted to the wing-base (Hobson Plan) organization. As a result, the wing was withdrawn from the Air National Guard and inactivated on 31 October 1950. Its personnel and those of its 211th Air Service Group formed the cadre for the 111th Composite Wing, while its elements in Pittsburgh formed the cadre for the 112th Fighter Wing, which were simultaneously allotted to the ANG and activated. The 153d AC&W Gp was transferred directly to the PA ANG.

== Lineage ==
- Constituted as 53d Troop Carrier Wing On 27 July 1942

Activated on 1 August 1942
Inactivated on 11 October 1945

- Redesignated 53d Fighter Wing, and allotted to the National Guard, on 24 May 1946

Extended federal recognition on 17 January 1947
Inactivated and allotment to the Air National Guard withdrawn on 31 October 1950

- Disbanded on 15 June 1983

=== Assignments ===
- I Troop Carrier Command, 1 August 1942
- IX Troop Carrier Command, 11 March 1944 – 12 August 1945
- Pennsylvania Air National Guard, 17 January 1947 – 31 October 1950

=== Components ===
==== World War II ====
- 61st Troop Carrier Group: 3 November 1942 – 15 February 1943
- 63rd Troop Carrier Group: April 1942 – July 1943
- 89th Troop Carrier Group: 3 November 1942 – 24 December 1942
- 313th Troop Carrier Group: 2 March 1942 – 24 April 1943
- 314th Troop Carrier Group: 30 August – 3 November 1942
- 316th Troop Carrier Group: 14 February – 12 November 1942
- 433rd Troop Carrier Group: 15 April – 2 June 1943
- 434th Troop Carrier Group: 15 April −16 October 1943, 3 March 1944 – July 1945
- 435th Troop Carrier Group: 3 November 1943 – 5 August 1945
- 436th Troop Carrier Group: 15 April – 19 July 1943, 3 March 1944 – August 1945
- 437th Troop Carrier Group: 17 February 1944 – 10 July 1945
- 438th Troop Carrier Group: February 1944-18 July 1945
- 440th Troop Carrier Group: July 1943

==== Air National Guard ====
- 111th Bombardment Group, 20 December 1948 – 31 October 1950
- 112th Fighter Group, 23 April 1949 – 31 October 1950
- 113th Fighter Group, 17 January 1947 – 31 October 1950 (District of Columbia ANG)
- 153d Aircraft Control and Warning Group, ca. Feb 1949 – 31 October 1950
- 211th Air Service Group, 17 Jan 1947 – 31 October 1950
- 212th Air Service Group (Group headquarters apparently not organized, only constituent flights)
- 213th Air Service Group, 17 Jan 1947 – 16 October 1950
- 104th Fighter Squadron, 17 January 1947 – 31 October 1950 (Maryland ANG)
- 142d Fighter Squadron, 17 January 1947 – 31 October 1950 (Delaware ANG)

=== Stations ===
- General Billy Mitchell Field, Wisconsin, 1 August 1942
- Pope Field, North Carolina, 26 August 1942
- Fort Sam Houston, Texas, 15 September 1942
- Bergstrom AAF, Texas, 5 November 1942
- Sedalia AAF, Missouri, 15 April 1943
- Alliance AAF, Nebraska, 25 July 1943
- Laurinburg-Maxton AAB, North Carolina, 19 September 1943
- Pope Field, North Carolina, 20 December 1943 – 19 January 1944
- RAF Greenham Common (AAF-486), England, 11 March 1944
- Voisenon, France, 20 February–October 1945
- Camp Shanks, New York, 10–11 October 1945.
- Philadelphia International Airport, 17 January 1947 – 31 October 1950

=== Awards ===
- American Theater of World War II
- European Theater of World War II
- Campaigns

Normandy
Northern France
Southern France

Rhineland
Ardennes-Alsace
Central Europe

- World War II Army of Occupation
