= 103rd Attack Squadron =

103rd Attack Squadron

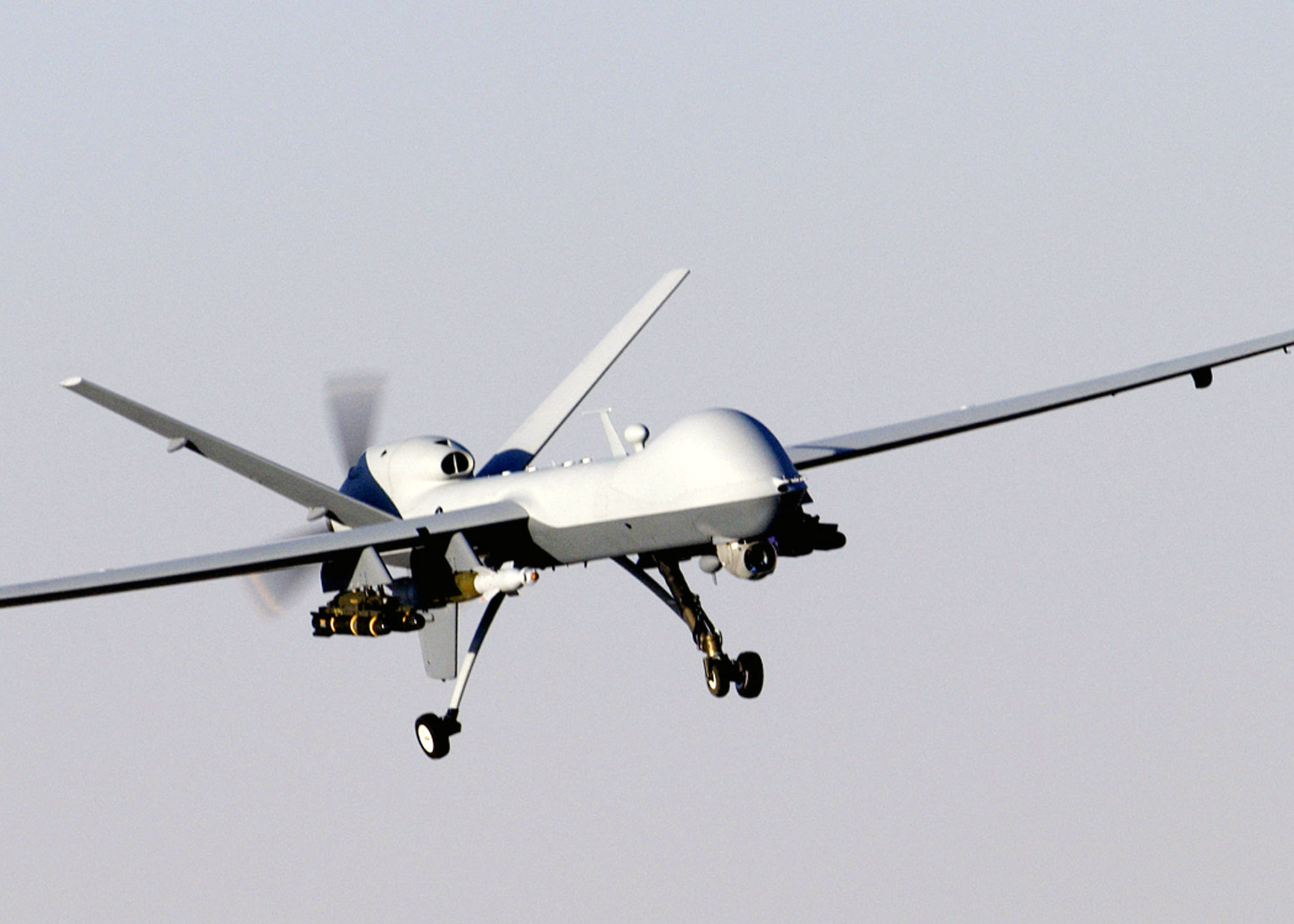
- MQ-9 Reaper in flight
- Active: 1924–1945; 1946–1953; 1953–2011; 2014–present
- Country: United States
- Allegiance: Pennsylvania
- Branch: Air National Guard
- Type: Squadron
- Part of: Pennsylvania Air National Guard
- Garrison/HQ: Biddle Air National Guard Base, Pennsylvania
- Nickname: Black Hogs
- Engagements: China-Burma-India Theater

Insignia
- 103rd Attack Squadron emblem (Note: The emblem remained the same, with the current unit nam on the tab.)

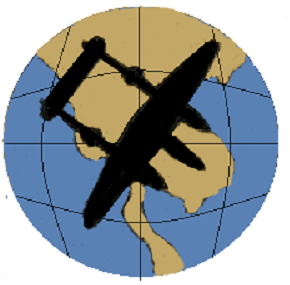
- Unofficial 40th Photographic Reconnaissance Squadron emblem.

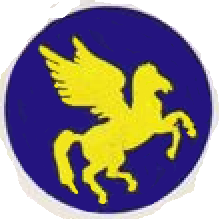
- 103rd Observation Squadron emblem (Note: Approved 10 April 1931.)
- Tail code: PAkins

The 103rd Attack Squadron is an active unit of the Pennsylvania Air National Guard previously known as the 103rd Fighter Squadron. It is assigned to the 111th Attack Wing, stationed at Biddle Air National Guard Base, Pennsylvania. The squadron was inactivated on 31 March 2011 and later reactivated as the 103rd Attack Squadron on the grounds of the former Naval Air Station Joint Reserve Base Willow Grove. Along with these name changes came a change of mission. The 103rd Attack Squadron now flies the General Atomics MQ-9 Reaper Remotely Piloted Aircraft.

The squadron was a descendant organization of the Pennsylvania National Guard 103rd Observation Squadron, formed on 27 June 1924. It was one of the 29 original National Guard Observation Squadrons of the United States Army National Guard formed before World War II.

== History ==
=== Pennsylvania National Guard ===
The Militia board authorized the Pennsylvania National Guard 103rd Observation Squadron in June 1924. The 103rd was founded and eventually commanded by Major Charles J. Biddle, who had flown in World War I as part of the famous American volunteer Lafayette Escadrille. This new National Guard squadron was based on the sod fields of Philadelphia Airport as a unit in the Army 28th Division.

The pilots of the 103rd flew a wide variety of observation aircraft for the next 18 years. The most well-known of these aircraft was the JN-4 Jenny. The Jenny was an open-cockpit bi-plane; but was replaced in the 1930s and early 1940s with metal-skinned, prop-driven observation monoplanes. The list is long but shows the steady improvement in aircraft: PT-1, BT-1, O-1, O-2H, O-11, O-38, O-46,-47A, O-47B, O-49, O-52, O-57 and P434-1. The squadron also flew liaison aircraft such as the L-4 and L-1B.

The squadron conducted summer training at Langley Field, Virginia, 1924–27 and Middletown Air Depot, Pennsylvania, 1928–40. They also flew reconnaissance operations in support of the 28th Division and 5nd Cavalry Brigade during summer training; flew tracking missions for the 213th Coast Artillery Regiment (AA); and flew spotter missions for the 107th, 108th, 109th, and 176th Field Artillery Regiments at Tobyhanna Firing Range. The entire squadron was called up to support flood relief efforts in central and eastern Pennsylvania in March–April 1936.

=== World War II ===
Inducted into active Federal service 17 February 1941 at Philadelphia, and transferred to the Harrisburg Municipal Airport, arriving there 27 February 1941.

In February 1941, as the war in Europe raged, the unit was ordered to active service, performing antisubmarine patrols off the coast of New England. In 1943, the 103rd finally moved into the latest combat aircraft. First, the pilots and maintenance personnel were given steady upgrades in equipment beginning with the P-39 Airacobra, P-40 Warhawks, and then the B-25 Mitchell. Eventually this culminated in training on the photo-reconnaissance variant of the P-38 Lightning called the F-5C. The twin-engine F-5C had all of the P-38's guns replaced by cameras.

After a year's worth of training, the 103rd deployed to the China-Burma-India Theater in 1944 where it operated out of various fields in India and Burma. It was heavily involved in photo reconnaissance activities over Burma, supporting the US Army forces fighting the Japanese in the jungles there. The 103rd personnel stayed in that theater until the end of the war.

=== Pennsylvania Air National Guard ===
The 40th Photographic Reconnaissance Squadron was redesignated the 103rd Bombardment Squadron and allotted to the National Guard on 24 May 1946. It was organized at Philadelphia International Airport, and extended federal recognition on 20 December 1948]. The 103rd Bombardment Squadron was equipped with B-26 Invader light bombers and assigned to the 111th Bombardment Group.

==== Korean War activation ====
The 103rd was federalized on 10 October 1950 along with its parent 111th Composite Wing due to the Korean War. Many of the pilots and maintenance personnel were split off and sent for duty overseas as individuals assigned to other combat units there. Eventually the B-26 bombers were sent as reinforcement aircraft to Far East Air Forces for use in Korea.

On 10 April 1951 the squadron and wing moved to Fairchild Air Force Base, Washington and re-equipped with RB-29 Superfortress reconnaissance aircraft. Based on the World War II B-29 Bomber, the RB-29s were instead configured with multiple aerial cameras for mapping and reconnaissance missions. These RB-29s were used like the reconnaissance satellites of today, except they required actual over flight of the countries to be photographed.

On 13 June 1952, two 111th pilots were flying an RB-29 over the Soviet Union when they were shot down by a pair of MiG-15s. The RB-29 was never recovered, having crashed in the waters off of Vladivostok, Russia. The Pennsylvanian families of the Air Guard pilots were told they had simply "vanished" in a weather-reconnaissance flight near Japan. It wasn't until the fall of the Soviet Union and the opening of communist archives that the relatives found out the truth in 1993. It is unknown as to whether any of the pilots or crew of this aircraft were captured by the Soviets at that time.

==== Cold War air defense ====
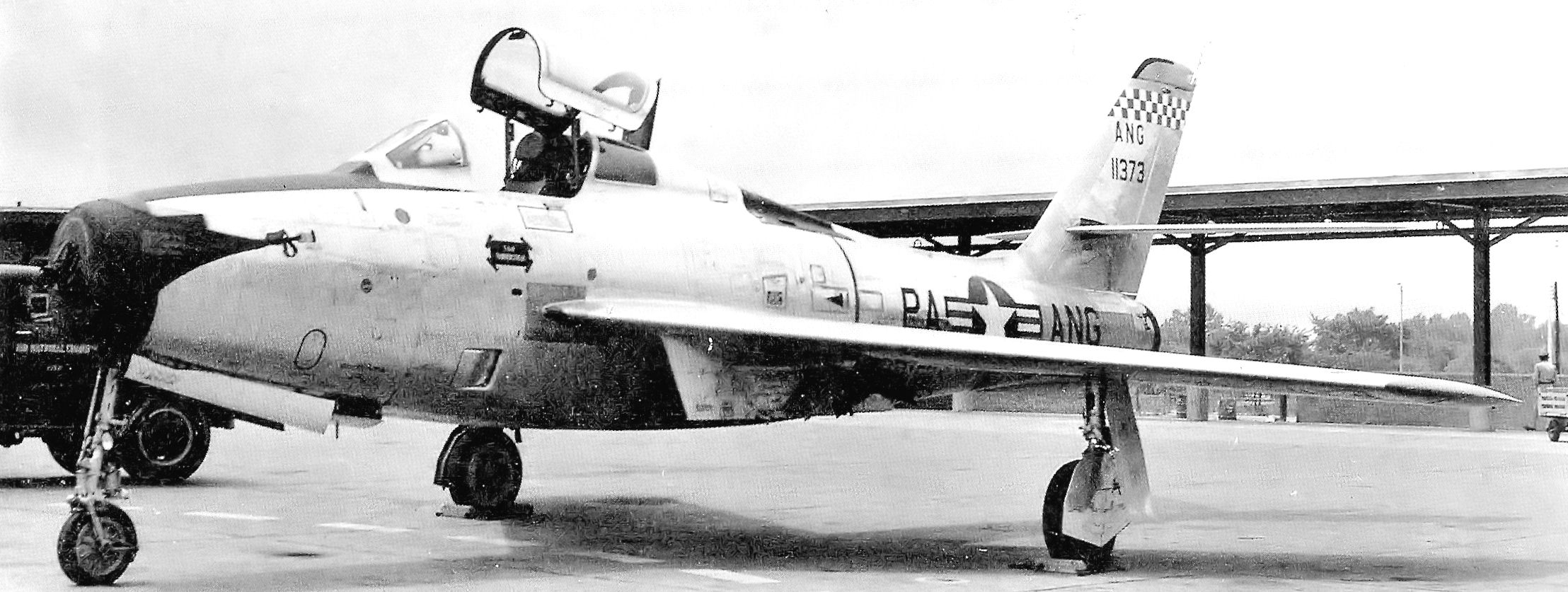
103rd FIS F-84F 51-1356, about 1955

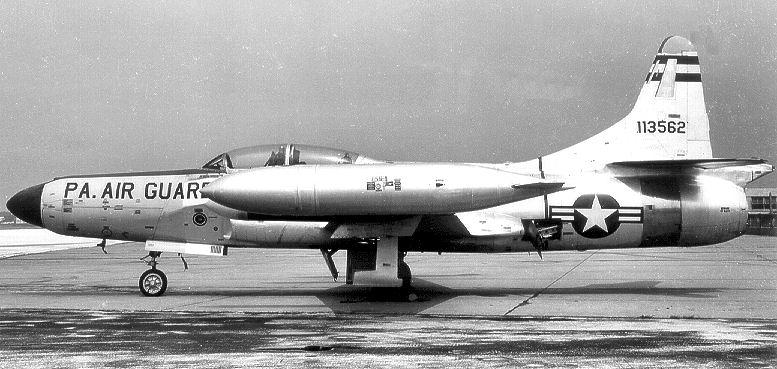
F-94C 51-3562 about 1959

The 103rd and the 111th were returned to control of the Pennsylvania Air National Guard in late November 1952, and the units were re-formed at Philadelphia International Airport by 1 January 1953. The 103rd was re-equipped with the F-51D Mustang World War II fighter because of a lack of available jets at the time due to the Korean War. It was re-designated as the 103rd Fighter Bomber Squadron and assumed an air defense mission. In 1955, Air Defense Command upgraded the group to the F-84F Thunderstreak, and it received new aircraft. In July 1956, the 103rd Fighter-Interceptor Squadron switched to F-94A and B Starfigher interceptors; to F-94Cs in 1958 and the F-89H Scorpion in 1959.

==== Airlift mission ====
In 1962, the unit transitioned from the F-89J jet interceptor to a large, heavy transport, the Boeing C-97 Stratofreighter, a double-decked, four-engine airplane. The new mission moved the wing into the Military Air Transport Service and its successor Military Airlift Command in 1966.

In 1963, the 111th ended its 39-year history at Philadelphia airport and moved to brand new facilities on the north end of the Willow Grove Naval Air Station. From Willow Grove, the C-97 was used to transport troops and cargo all over the world. The unit's flying personnel were used heavily during the Vietnam War and over two hundred members earned Vietnam Service Medals for their flights into that war zone.

==== Airborne forward air control ====
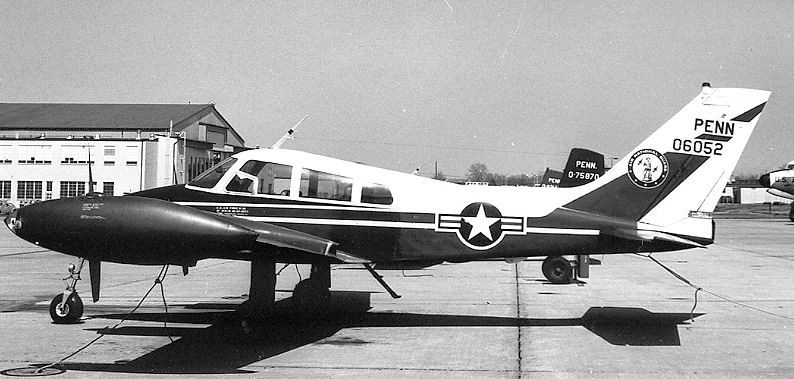
Cessna U-3A Blue Canoe about 1970

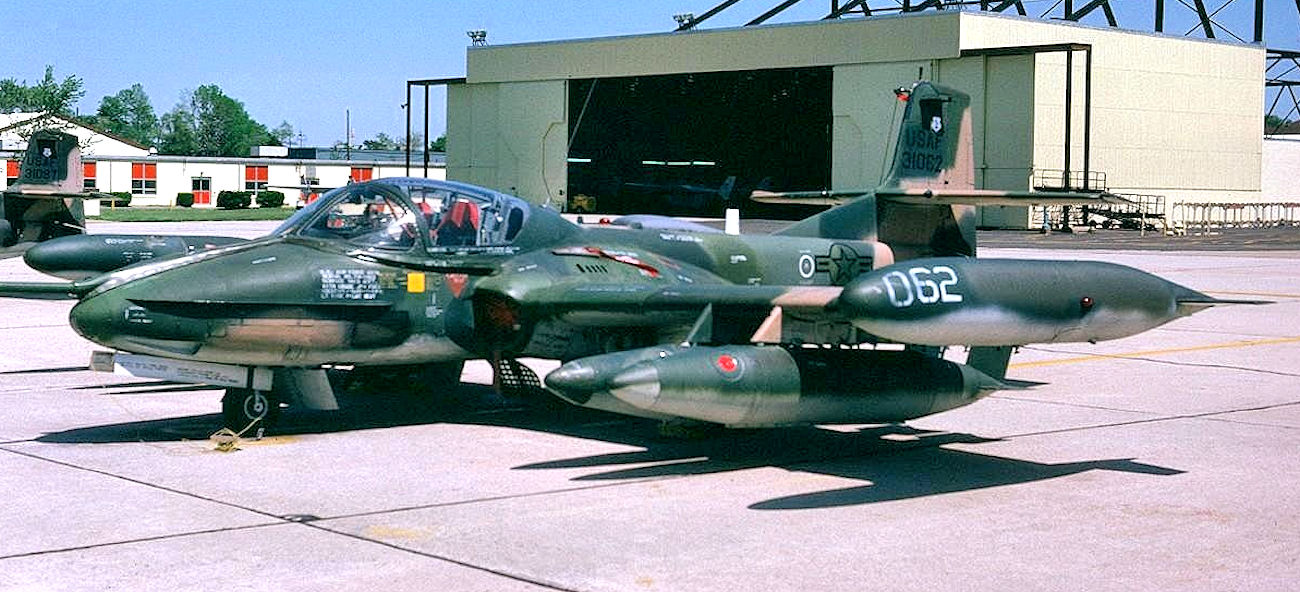
103rd TASS A-37B 73-1062, 1982

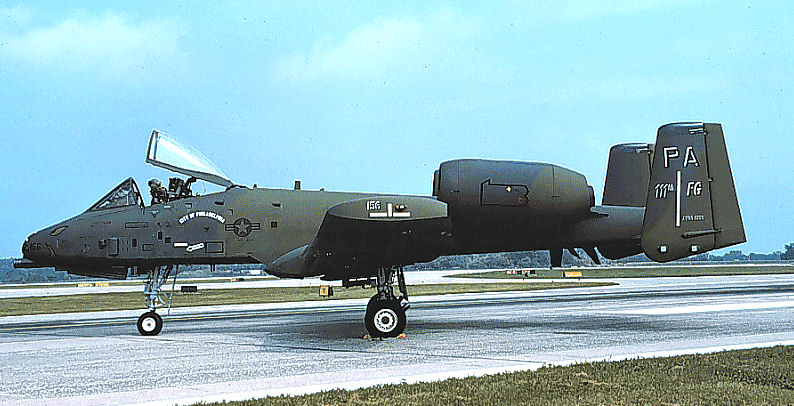
103rd TASS OA-10A about 1992

In 1969, the unit changed mission yet again, returning to its original roots as an observation unit. The new 111th Tactical Air Support Group initially flew the U-3A Blue Canoe, a Cessna-310, as an intermediate aircraft until it received the aircraft it needed for Airborne Forward Air Control (AFAC): the O-2A Skymaster. The O-2 was a two propeller aircraft used early in the Vietnam War for coordination between ground forces and fighter aircraft (the "O" stands for observation).

The Forward Air Control mission was sustained with the unit's switch to the OA-37 Dragonfly in 1981. The OA-37, was a heavier derivative of the T-37 trainer, and had been developed specifically for the Vietnam War. The unit made several deployments to Central America in the 1980s to fly with US allies there, who had been sold the A-37 as part of the US Foreign Military Sales program.

The A-37s were retired in 1988, and the 111th received the A-10A Thunderbolt II ground support aircraft. It was also used as a FAC aircraft (OA-10). Pilots continued their previous mission of providing AFAC and Combat Search and Rescue, although in a much more combat-hardened attack plane. The A-10 allowed the wing to take part in the new deployments to Southwest Asia following Operation Desert Storm. The unit was re-designated as the 111th Fighter Group in 1992 and then as the 111th Fighter Wing in 1995.

Participating in Operation Southern Watch, the wing took advantage of this aircraft upgrade by volunteering for a 90-day deployment to Kuwait in 1995, to support joint combat flight operations for Operation Southern Watch over Iraq. Twelve aircraft were deployed to Ahmad al-Jaber Air Base – a joint-use base by U.S. and Kuwait Air Forces. The base was fairly austere as it had suffered considerable war-damage from Desert Storm. Missions included Combat Search and Rescue alert, Kill Box flights over Iraq, Airborne Forward Air Control and joint training missions over Kuwait. About 40% of the wing participated in the deployment

Another interesting element was a small side deployment to Qatar. The wing was the first Air Guard fighter unit deployed to Al Jaber and also the first ANG Wing to volunteer for a solo three-month Operation Southern Watch deployment. The combat flight missions over Iraq were to enforce compliance with the Iraqi No Fly Zones.

==== Ground support ====
In 1996, the squadron's pilots transitioned from the OA-10 AFAC mission to the universal A-10 "attack" mission. Now the pilots' primary task was to provide Close Air Support (CAS) for joint service ground forces, as well as performing AFAC and CSAR duties as before. This change to the normal A-10 role aligned the wing with all the other A-10 units in the active duty and Air Reserve Component.

The second squadron deployment to Ahmad al-Jaber Air Base occurred in 1999, again to support joint combat flight operations for Operation Southern Watch over Iraq. Missions included Combat Search and Rescue alert, Kill Box flights over Iraq, Airborne Forward Air Control and joint training missions over Kuwait. Use of the A-10 was more limited than before, due to the aircraft's relative lack of precision weapon capability [except the AGM-65 Maverick air-to-ground tactical missile].

==== Afghanistan ====
Immediately following the September 11 terrorist attacks on NYC and Washington, DC, the 111th Wing voluntarily deployed on very short notice back to Ahmad al-Jaber Air Base to support joint combat flight operations for Operation Southern Watch over Iraq and Operation Enduring Freedom over Afghanistan. Missions included Combat Search and Rescue alert and joint training missions over Kuwait. Wing weapons personnel assisted in the loading of combat ordnance for the first sorties into Afghanistan in November, 2001.

From October 2002 – January 2003, the wing was the lead unit for a short notice, voluntary, out-of-cycle AEF deployment to Bagram Air Base, Afghanistan. Bagram had been a massive Soviet base during the decade when they occupied Afghanistan (1979–89), but was almost completely destroyed in that period and civil war afterwards. The 111th aircraft supported joint combat flight operations with US Army, Special Forces, and coalition ground forces in Afghanistan. The A-10s were flown and maintained in the most primitive conditions, yet the 111th personnel flew 100% of the assigned tasking for their entire deployment – at four times the normal sortie rate of home. Other unique aspects of the operation were total 'blacked out' night-time operations (no lights on the field or camp – everything was done by night vision goggles); an extensive number of mines/UXOs around and on the air field; extreme weather conditions and enemy shelling using BM-12 107mm rockets.

==== Operation Iraqi Freedom ====
Upon returning to the U.S. in January 2003, the 111th FW again volunteered to participate in another SWA deployment to Ahmad al-Jaber Air Base, Kuwait [fourth visit] from February 2003 – May 2003. The wing deployed for joint combat flight operations, in support of US Army, Marine and British ground forces as part of the initial phase of Operation Iraqi Freedom. Wing personnel were initially stationed at Al Jaber before transferring to Tallil Air Base, Iraq, midway through the initial campaign. Tallil was a former Iraqi air force base, which had not been used in a decade.

During this campaign, which included direct support for coalition armor forces during the entire invasion from the Kuwait border, through Basra and Baghdad, the wing pilots and maintainers successfully operated at a very high sortie rate. Tallil AB operations set another milestone due to its austere nature and forward location (which was essential to support the heavy forces' attack toward the capital).

The 111th Fighter Wing's achievement of voluntarily deploying to austere bases in two separate combat operations within a five-month period [2003] was part of the reason the unit was awarded the Air Force Outstanding Unit Award, with Combat "V" device, in 2005. It also was awarded the Reserve Family Readiness Award in 2003 and the ANG Distinguished Flying Unit Award in 2004.

==== Transition to UAVs, 2011-2013 ====
In its 2005 Base Realignment and Closure Commission recommendations, DoD recommended the 111th Fighter Wing be inactivated and its assigned A-10 aircraft reassigned to the 124th Wing (three primary aircraft); 175th Wing, (three primary aircraft); 127th Wing (three primary aircraft) and retire the remaining aircraft (six primary aircraft).

This recommendation was part of a larger recommendation that would close NAS JRB Willow Grove. DoD claimed that this recommendation would enable Air Force Future Total Force transformation by consolidating the A-10 fleet at installations of higher military value. Despite appeals from Ed Rendell, the Governor of Pennsylvania, the recommendations were upheld and the A-10s departed during 2010. The 103d Fighter Squadron inactivated on 31 March 2011.

On 7 June 2014, during the Pennsylvania ANG's annual Flight of Freedom event, the 103rd Fighter Squadron became the 103rd Attack Squadron.

The renamed 103rd Squadron reached initial operational RPA capability with the launch of its first combat air patrol sortie at Horsham AGS on 3 April 2016.

== Lineage ==
- Constituted and allotted to the National Guard in 1921 as the 103rd Squadron (Observation)

Redesignated 103rd Observation Squadron on 25 January 1923
Organized and extended federal recognition on 27 June 1924
Ordered to active service on 17 February 1941
Redesignated 103rd Observation Squadron (Medium) on 13 January 1942
Redesignated 103rd Observation Squadron on 4 July 1942
Redesignated 103rd Reconnaissance Squadron (Fighter) on 2 April 1943
Redesignated 103rd Tactical Reconnaissance Squadron on 11 August 1943
Redesignated 40th Photographic Reconnaissance Squadron on 21 October 1943
Inactivated on 2 November 1945

- Redesignated 103rd Bombardment Squadron, Light and allotted to the National Guard on 24 May 1946

Extended federal recognition on 20 Dec 1948
Ordered into active service on 1 April 1951
Redesignated 103rd Strategic Reconnaissance Squadron, Medium, Photographic on 1 August 1951
Redesignated 103rd Strategic Reconnaissance Squadron, Medium on 16 June 1952
Redesignated 103rd Strategic Reconnaissance Squadron, Heavy on 16 October 1952
Relieved from active duty and returned to state control. on 1 January 1953

- Redesignated 103rd Fighter-Bomber Squadron and activated on 1 January 1953

Redesignated 103rd Fighter-Interceptor Squadron on 1 May 1955
Redesignated 103rd Air Transport Squadron Heavy on 1 April 1962
Redesignated 103rd Military Airlift Squadron on 1 January 1966
Redesignated 103rd Tactical Air Support Squadron on 27 May 1969
Redesignated 103rd Fighter Squadron on 15 Mar 1992
Inactivated on 31 March 2011
Redesignated 103rd Attack Squadron
Activated c. 7 June 2014

=== Assignments ===
- 28th Division Air Service (later 28th Division Aviation), 27 June 1924
- 315th Observation Group, 15 February 1929 (attached to 28th Division)
- 43rd Observation Group, 1 October 1933 (attached to 28th Division)
- II Corps, 17 February 1941
- 59th Observation Group, 1 September 1941
- 26th Observation Group (later 26th Reconnaissance Group, 26th Tactical Reconnaissance Group), 18 October 1942
- III Reconnaissance Command, 21 October 1943
- I Tactical Air Division (later III Tactical Air Division), 18 April 1944
- Army Air Forces, India-Burma Sector, 3 June 1944
- Tenth Air Force, 5 July 1944
- 8th Photographic Group (later 8th Reconnaissance) Group), 18 July 1944 – 2 November 1945
- 111th Bombardment Group (later 111th Composite Group, 111th Bombardment Group, 111th Strategic Reconnaissance Group), 20 December 1948
- 111th Strategic Reconnaissance Wing, 16 June 1952 – 1 January 1953
- 111th Fighter-Bomber Group (later 111th Fighter-Interceptor Group, 111th Fighter Group, 111th Air Transport Group, 111th Military Airlift Group, 111th Tactical Air Support Group, 111th Fighter Group, 111th Operations Group), 1 January 1953 – 31 March 2011
- 111th Operations Group, c. 7 June 2014

=== Stations ===
- Philadelphia Airport, Pennsylvania, 27 June 1924
- Pitcairn Field, Pennsylvania, 1936
- Harrisburg Municipal Airport, Pennsylvania, 27 February 1941
- Hillsgrove Army Air Field, Rhode Island, 23 December 1941
- Hyannis Army Air Field, Massachusetts, 9 June 1942
- Fort Devens Army Air Field, Massachusetts, 20 August 1942
- Reading Army Air Field, Pennsylvania, 8 June 1943
- Birmingham Army Air Field, Alabama, 20 November 1943
- Will Rogers Field, Oklahoma, 11 February – 11 May 1944
- Guskhara Airfield, India, 10 July 1944
- Alipore Airfield, Calcutta, India, 9 August 1944

Detachment at Cox's Bazaar Airfield, India, after c. 10 December 1944

- Cox's Bazaar Airfield, India, 18 January 1945
- Akyab Airfield, Burma, 14 February 1945
- Alipore Airfield, Calcutta, India, C. 15 May 1945
- Kanchrapara Airfield, India, September–c. 4 October 1945
- Camp Kilmer, New Jersey, 1–2 November 1945
- Philadelphia International Airport, Pennsylvania, 20 December 1948
- Fairchild Air Force Base, Washington, 1 April 1951 – 1 January 1953
- Philadelphia International Airport, Pennsylvania, 1 January 1953
- Naval Air Station Willow Grove (later Naval Air Station Joint Reserve Base Willow Grove), Pennsylvania, c. January 1963 – 31 Mar 2011
- Horsham Air Guard Base (later Biddle Air National Guard Base), Pennsylvania, c. 7 June 2014 - present

=== Aircraft ===
- Curtiss JN-6H, 1924
- Operated: PT-1, BT-1, O-1, O-2H, O-11; O-38, 1924–1941
- Douglas O-46, 1941–1942
- North American O-47, 1941–1942
- O-49 Vigilant, 1941–1942
- O-57 Grasshopper, 1941–1942
- F-5 Lightning, 1944–1945
- B-26B/C Invader, 1946–1951
- RB-29 Superfortress, 1951–1952
- F-51D Mustang, 1953–1954
- F-84F Thunderstreak, 1954–1956
- F-94A/B Starfire, 1956–1958
- F-94C Starfire, 1958–1959
- F-89H Scorpion, 1959–1962
- C-97 Stratofreighter, 1962–1969
- U-3A Blue Canoe, 1969–1970
- O-2 Skymaster, 1970–1982
- OA-37B Dragonfly, 1982–1989
- A-10 Thunderbolt II, 1988–2011
- MQ-9 Reaper, 2014–present

== See also ==
- List of United States Army National Guard Observation Squadrons
