= 342nd Fighter-Day Group =

United States Air Force military unit

342nd Fighter Day Group
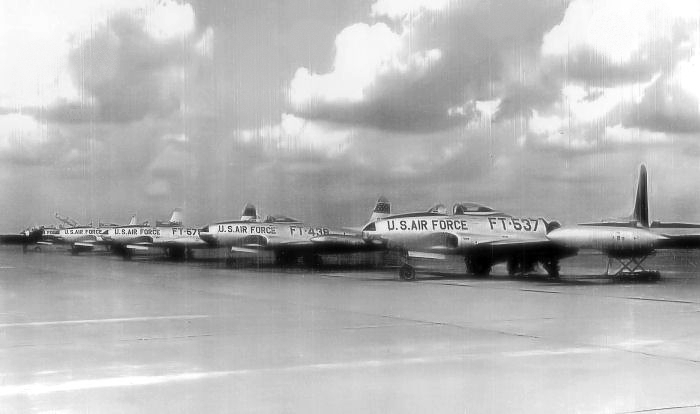
- Group F-80 Shooting Stars at Myrtle Beach AFB (Note: Lockheed F-80C-LO, serial 47-537 is in the foreground.)
- Active: 1942–1944; 1956
- Country: United States
- Branch: United States Air Force
- Role: Fighter
- Engagements: European Theater of Operations

The 342nd Fighter-Day Group is an inactive United States Air Force unit. It was last assigned to the 342nd Fighter-Day Wing at Myrtle Beach Air Force Base, South Carolina, where it was inactivated on 18 November 1956, when its personnel and equipment were transferred to another unit, which was simultaneously activated.

The group was first activated in September 1942 as the 342d Composite Group. It participated in the defense of Iceland until it was disbanded in March 1944.

== History ==
=== World War II ===
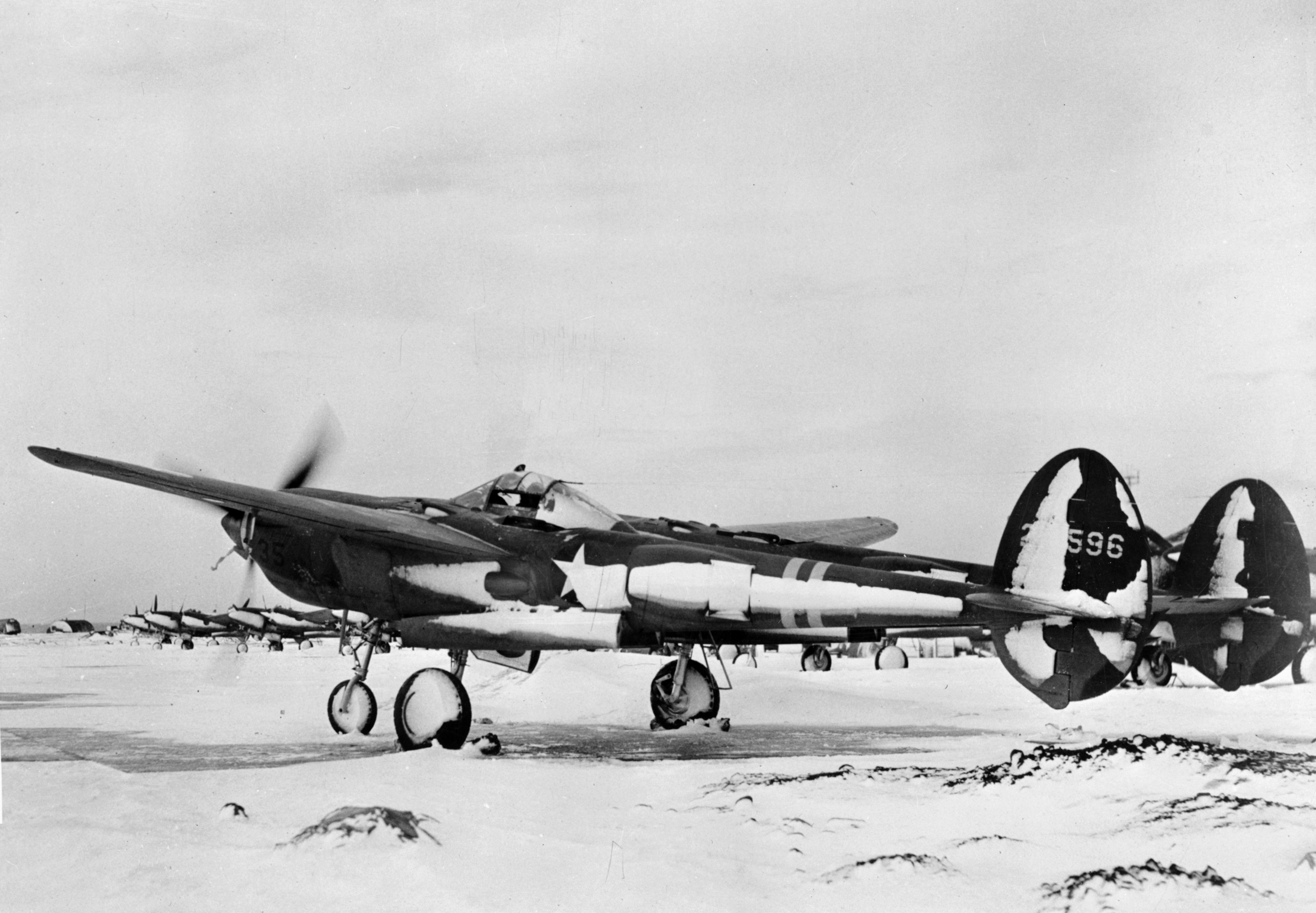
P-38F Lightning of the 50th Fighter Squadron in Iceland (Note: Aircraft is Lockheed P-38F-5-LO Lightning, serial 42-12596 in 1942.)

The group was first activated at Meeks Field, Iceland in September 1942 as the 342d Composite Group. It was to act as a headquarters for fighter aircraft squadrons defending Iceland. The group initially included the 33d and 337th Fighter Squadrons. The 33d Squadron had deployed to Iceland in August 1941, prior to the formal entry of the United States into World War II and flew Bell P-39 Airacobras. the 337th Fighter Squadron was activated along with the group and was equipped with Lockheed P-38 Lightnings.

The 50th Fighter Squadron, flying Lightnings, had diverted from its deployment to England and had begun operating from Iceland in August 1942, although formally stationed in England. In November, its duty station became Iceland and it was assigned to the group, replacing the 337th Squadron, which moved to the United States later that month.

The group's participation in the defense of Iceland was intercepting German long range aircraft attempting to attack Iceland. It also attacked enemy planes in their area of responsibility that were on reconnaissance missions. An American plane had been the first to destroy an enemy plane in Iceland. On the morning of 14 August 1942 two American fighter pilots intercepted and destroyed a Focke-Wulf Fw 200 Condor about ten miles north of Reykjavík. It was the first German plane of the war to be shot down by the Army Air Forces.

During the next two months American fighter planes shot down two more German planes and intercepted others.A few planes appeared during the winter, but none was intercepted and only two came under antiaircraft fire. A Junkers Ju 88 bomber, was shot down in April 1943 by two planes of the 50th Fighter Squadron. On 5 August, American planes shot down another German bomber, the fifth and last enemy plane to be destroyed over Iceland.

The group also conducted antisubmarine patrols in the North Atlantic and provided cover for convoys on the run to Murmansk", Soviet Union.

After the summer of 1943, little German activity was noted over the North Atlantic skies. The enemy was on the defensive, and the American defensive outposts in the Atlantic were shifting to secondary roles. In February 1944, the 50th Squadron became non operational and was transferred from the group. With only a single squadron remaining, the group was disbanded in March 1944, and the 33d Squadron was transferred to the 24th Composite Wing.

=== Jet fighter training ===
The group was reconstituted, designated the 342d Fighter-Day Group, and activated in July 1956 as part of the 342d Fighter-Day Wing when the Air Force re-opened Myrtle Beach Air Force Base, South Carolina. The group began training with Lockheed T-33 T-Bird advanced jet trainers and reconnaissance versions of the single seat Lockheed F-80 Shooting Stars in preparation for equipping with the North American F-100 Super Sabre. However, before the group could reach operational status, it was inactivated and its personnel and equipment were transferred to the 354th Fighter-Day Group.

== Lineage ==
- Constituted as the 342nd Composite Group on 29 August 1942

Activated on 11 September 1942
Disbanded on 18 March 1944

- Reconstituted and redesignated 342nd Fighter-Day Group on 7 May 1956

Activated on 25 July 1956
Inactivated on 18 November 1956

=== Assignments ===
- Iceland Base Command, 11 September 1942
- 24th Composite Wing, 25 December 1942 – 18 March 1944
- 342nd Fighter-Day Wing, 25 July 1956 – 18 November 1956

=== Components ===
- 33d Fighter Squadron (later 33d Fighter-Day Squadron), 11 September 1942 – 18 March 1944, 25 July–19 November 1956
- 50th Fighter Squadron, 14 November 1942 – 1 February 1944
- 337th Fighter Squadron, 11 September–26 November 1942
- 572d Fighter-Day Squadron, 25 July–19 November 1956
- 573d Fighter-Day Squadron, 25 July–19 November 1956

=== Stations ===
- Meeks Field, Iceland 29 August 1942 – 18 March 1944
- Myrtle Beach Air Force Base, South Carolina, 25 July–18 November 1956

=== Aircraft ===
- Lockheed P-38 Lightning (1942–1944)
- Bell P-39 Airacobra (1942–1944)
- Curtiss P-40 Warhawk (1942–1944)
- Douglas B-18 Bolo (1942–1944)
- Lockheed F-80 Shooting Star (1956)
- Lockheed T-33 T-Bird (1956)-
