= Biddle Air National Guard Base =

Pennsylvania Air National Guard facility

- Horsham Township, Pennsylvania in the United States
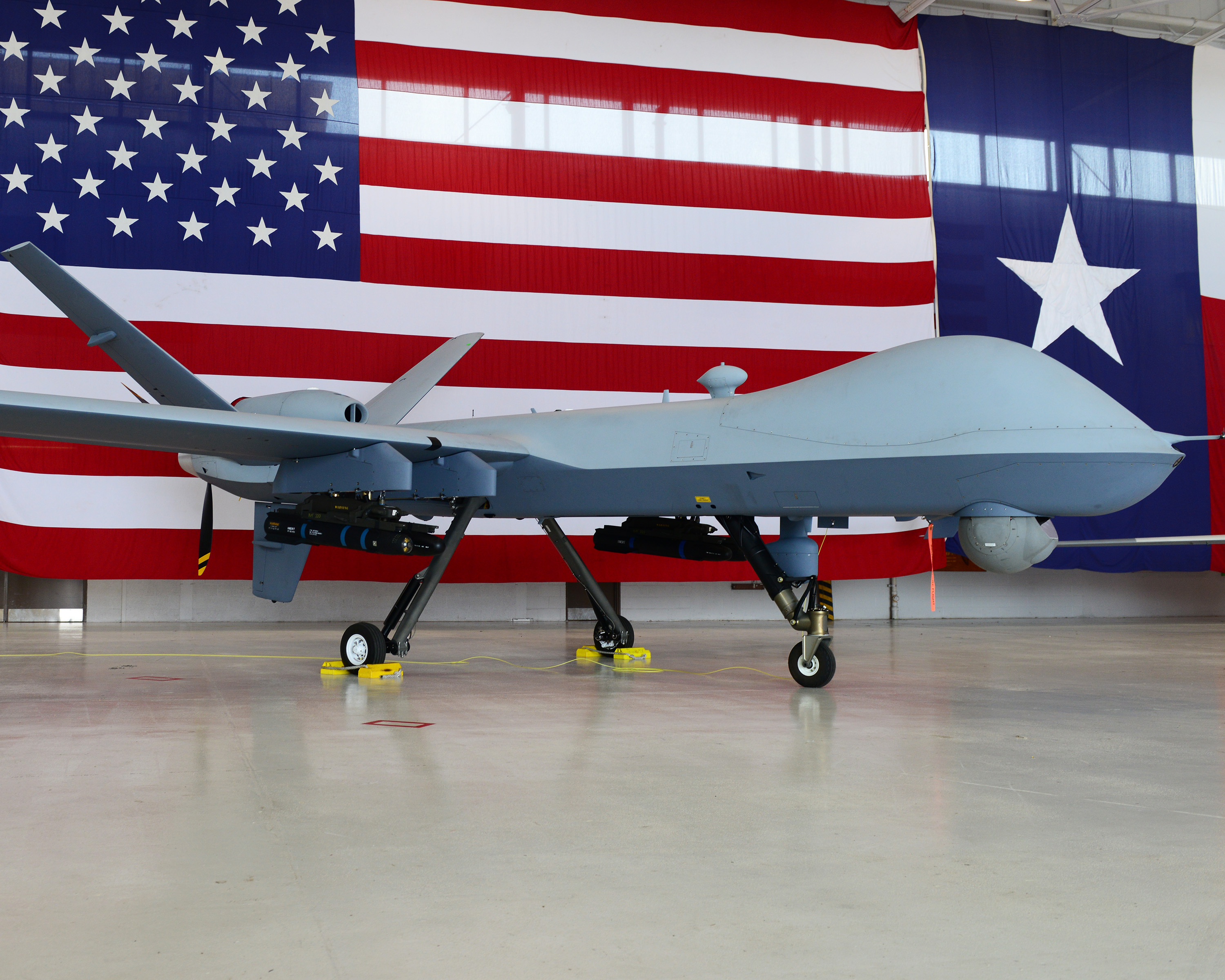
- A General Atomics MQ-9 Reaper unmanned aerial vehicle of the 111th Attack Wing based at Biddle ANGB

Site information
- Type: Air National Guard Base
- Owner: Department of Defense
- Operator: US Air Force
- Controlled by: Pennsylvania Air National Guard
- Condition: Operational
- Website: www.111attackwing.ang.af.mil

Location
- Location within Pennsylvania Location within the United States
- Coordinates: 40.209°N 75.145°W

Site history
- Built: 1928 (as Pitcairn Field No. 2)
- Built by: Pitcairn Aircraft Company
- In use: 1943–2011 (US Navy); 2011–present (US Air Force)

Garrison information
- Garrison: 111th Attack Wing (Host)

Biddle Air National Guard Base (formerly Horsham Air Guard Station, 2011–2021) is owned by the Pennsylvania Air National Guard and located in Horsham Township, Montgomery County, Pennsylvania, United States. The Air National Guard plays host to many different Army Reserve and Army National Guard Units as well as other government agencies. Biddle ANGB is home to the 111th Attack Wing flying the MQ-9 Reaper attack drone.

== History ==
The site was first established as Pitcairn Field No. 2 in 1926. It became Naval Air Station Willow Grove and then later Joint Reserve Base Willow Grove before ownership/stewardship transferred to the Pennsylvania Air National Guard.

In 2021, it was renamed in honor of Charles Biddle, the founder of the Pennsylvania Air National Guard's 103rd Observation Squadron (now, the 103rd Attack Squadron).

== Units ==
Biddle Air National Guard Base is home to the following:

- 111th Attack Wing
- Detachment 1, 201st RED HORSE Squadron
- 270th Engineering Installation Squadron
- 56th Stryker Brigade Combat Team
- 316th Sustainment Command (Expeditionary)
- 412th Engineer Command
- 338th Medical Brigade

== See also ==
- List of United States Air Force installations
