= 342nd Fighter-Day Wing =

342nd Fighter Day Wing
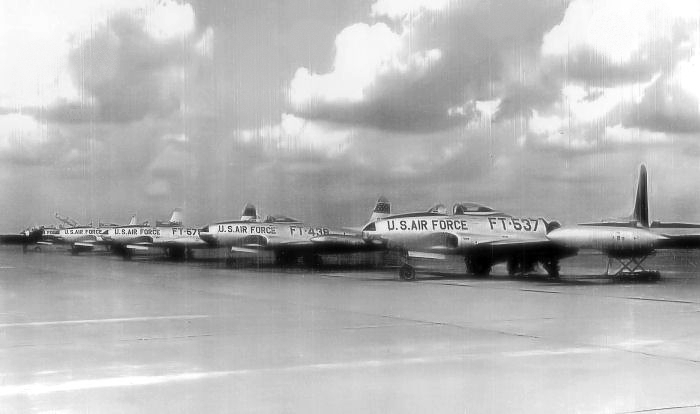
- Wing F-80 Shooting Stars on the Myrtle Beach AFB ramp
- Active: 1956–1956
- Country: United States
- Branch: United States Air Force
- Role: Fighter

Commanders
- Notable commanders: Francis S. Gabreski

The 342nd Fighter-Day Wing (officially 342d) is an inactive United States Air Force wing. It was activated in July 1956, when the Air Force reopened Myrtle Beach Air Force Base, South Carolina. It was inactivated in November and its mission, personnel, and aircraft were transferred to the 354th Fighter-Day Wing, which was simultaneously activated.

== History ==
On 25 July 1956, the 342nd Fighter-Day Wing was activated at Myrtle Beach Air Force Base, South Carolina. The wing's operational components were the 342nd and 455th Fighter-Day Groups. The wing was equipped with various models of the Lockheed F-80 Shooting Star. Its first commander was Colonel Robert G. Emmens. The wing assumed host duties at Myrtle Beach from the 4434th Air Base Squadron, which had been organized on 9 April 1956 to reopen Myrtle Beach, which had been an army air field during World War II. The 4434th provided the wing's initial cadre. Colonel Emmens was replaced as wing commander on 10 September 1956 by Colonel Francis S. Gabreski.

The wing's mission was officially that of a fighter-day wing with two assigned groups. In reality, wing efforts and activities were focused on reaching operational capability by overcoming the problems inherent in the activation of a new fighter wing on a base still largely under construction. Close liaison was maintained between units at Shaw Air Force Base, South Carolina for many activities. There were regularly scheduled truck convoys between Shaw and Myrtle Beach during the wing's development. For this reason, none of the wing's tactical units reached operational status before it was inactivated.

On 19 November, the Air Force inactivated the 342nd Wing and transferred its mission, personnel and equipment to the 354th Fighter-Day Wing, which was simultaneously activated.

== Lineage ==
- Established as 342nd Fighter Day Wing on 7 May 1956

Activated on 25 July 1956
Inactivated on 18 November 1956

=== Components ===
- 342nd Fighter-Day Group, 25 July – 19 November 1956
- 342nd Air Base Group, 25 July – 19 November 1956
- 342nd Maintenance and Supply Group, 25 July – 19 November 1956
- 455th Fighter-Day Group, 25 July – 19 November 1956
- 4465th USAF Dispensary, 25 July – 19 November 1956

=== Assignments ===
- Ninth Air Force, 25 July 1956 – 18 November 1956

=== Stations ===
- Myrtle Beach Air Force Base, South Carolina, 25 July 1956 – 18 November 1956

=== Major aircraft assigned ===
- Lockheed RF-80 Shooting Star (1956)
- Lockheed T-33 T-Bird (1956)
