= Vitry-en-Artois Airfield =

Airfield in France

Vitry-En-Artois Airfield Advanced Landing Ground (ALG) B-50
- IATA: none; ICAO: none

Summary
- Location: Vitry-En-Artois, France
- Elevation AMSL: 174 ft / 53 m
- Coordinates: 50°20′15″N 002°59′30″E

Map
- Location of Vitry-En-Artois Airfield

Runways
Direction	Length		Surface
Direction	ft	m	Surface
11/29	5,400	1,646	CON
05/23	5,250	1,600	TAR

Vitry-en-Artois Airfield was originally a grass airfield dating back prior to 1914, located 1 mile (1.6 km) northeast of Vitry-en-Artois; 105 miles (169 km) north-northeast of Paris. During World War I it was used by the Imperial German Air Service. With the outbreak of World War II it served as a temporary landing ground for several RAF squadrons attached to the BEF. In June 1940 during the Battle of France it was seized by the Germans, who developed it as a Luftwaffe fighter and bomber base during the occupation. Recaptured by the Allies in late 1944, it was used as an Allied military airfield until the end of the war.

== History ==
Error : Confusion between Vitry-en-Artois (B-50, northern France) and Vitry-le-François (A-67, Champagne region).

=== German use during World War II ===
A small grass airfield prior to World War II, it was seized by the Germans in late May 1940. After its capture, Vitry-En-Artois was used by the Luftwaffe as a combat airfield during the Battle of France. As part of the Blitzkrieg, the Germans assigned the following units to the airfield during the battle, carrying out air attacks on the defending French and British Expeditionary Force:

- Jagdgeschwader 54 (JS 54) 28 May – 6 June 1940 Messerschmitt Bf 109E
- Jagdgeschwader 51 (JS 51) 1–9 June 1940 Messerschmitt Bf 109E
- Lehrgeschwader 1 (LG 1) 14–25 June 1940 Junkers Ju 88A

After the Second Armistice at Compiègne on 22 June, the Luftwaffe moved Kampfgeschwader 53 (KG 53) to the airfield on 12 July. KG 53 was a Heinkel He 111 medium bomber unit that participated in the ensuing Battle of Britain, remaining assigned to Vitry until 18 June 1941.

Later in 1941, the Germans improved the facility into a permanent Luftwaffe airfield by expanding the support area with numerous maintenance shops, hangars, and laying down two 1500-metre-long concrete all-weather runways, aligned 03/21 and 09/27 (A possible third runway, aligned 13/31 is visible in aerial photography, only part of the 13 (northwest) end still remains). Numerous taxiways and dispersal aircraft parking areas were also constructed. As Vitry is located in the Pas-de-Calais, it was believed by the Germans that when the Americans and British tried to land in France to open a Second Front, the airfield would have a key role in the defence of France.

In 1943, Vitry-En-Artois became a day interceptor airfield which housed fighters to attack the USAAF Eighth Air Force heavy bomber fleets attacking targets in Occupied Europe and Germany. Known units assigned (all from Luftflotte 3, Fliegerkorps IV):

- Jagdgeschwader 2 (JS 2) August–December 1943 Focke-Wulf Fw 190A
- Kampfgeschwader 2 (KG 2) 22 January-6 February 1944 Messerschmitt Me 410A/U
- Jagdgeschwader 26 (JS 26) 21–29 August 1944 Focke-Wulf Fw 190A

Largely due to its use as a base for interceptors, and also as part of Operation Quicksilver, which was designed to deceive the Germans about where the invasion of France would take place, Vitry-En-Artois was attacked several times by Eighth Air Force B-17 Flying Fortress heavy bomber groups in 1943 and 1944.

=== Allied use ===
Vitry-en-Artois was cleared of German forces in late August 1944 by elements of the First Canadian Army. Before withdrawing, hangars, buildings, electrical generators, water treatment and other facilities that had not yet been destroyed by Allied bombing, were blown up by German combat engineers. After capture by Allied forces, Airfield Construction Teams from the Royal Engineers and No. 85 Group RAF cleared and repaired the airfield to bring it back to operational status as Advanced Landing Ground "B-50".

B-50 was used by the following RAF units, and as a marshalling and assembly area for transport units for elements of the First Allied Airborne Army during Operation Varsity in March 1945.

- No. 184 Squadron RAF, 4–15 September 1944 (Hawker Typhoon IB)
- No. 226 Squadron RAF "Sussex Missions" (No. 137 Wing RAF), 17 October 1944 – 22 April 1945 (Mitchell II)
- No. 88 (Hong Kong) Squadron RAF (No. 137 Wing), 17 October 1944 – 6 April 1945 (Douglas Boston III & IV)
- No. 342 (GB I/20 'Lorraine') Squadron RAF "FAFL Groupe Lorraine" (No. 137 Wing), 17 October 1944 – 22 April 1945 (Douglas Boston III & IV, Mitchell II)

With the war ended, it was also used as a storage area for surplus allied (mostly American) aircraft after the war by Air Technical Service Command. Vitry-en-Artois was returned to French control on 18 December 1945.

=== Postwar ===
In French control after the war, the airfield sat abandoned for years. There was much unexploded ordnance at the site which needed to be removed, as well as the wreckage of German and Allied aircraft. All of the buildings at the base were destroyed by the Allied air attacks or demolition, and although some had been repaired, most were in ruins. The French Air Force wanted nothing to do with a Nazi airfield on French soil, and as a result, the Air Ministry leased the land, concrete runways, structures and all, out to farmers for agricultural use, sending in unexploded ordnance teams to remove the dangerous munitions.

Eventually the facility was cleared of much of the rubble and ruins of the German airfield. Concrete taxiways, parking ramps and dispersal pads were removed and turned into hardcore aggregate, eventually clearing the land which was leased to farmers for agricultural fields. Relics of both wartime runways still exist, and single-lane agricultural roads are the remains of some of the former taxiways. The runways are still littered with bomb craters, now grown in by soil and grass and other vegetation.

At some time in more recent years, a small General Aviation airfield was established south of the wartime air base, along the D950. It had minimal facilities, and no connection to the wartime field. On 8 March 2024 this airfield was closed, allowing development of a wind-turbine farm.

In the autumn of 2025, a new runway 18/36 was created, solely for use by ultralight aircraft.
