= 112th Air Refueling Group =

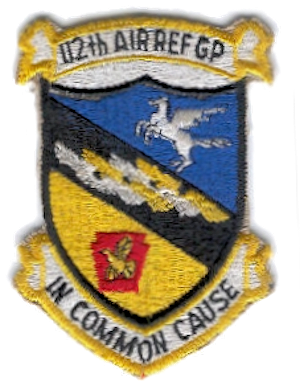
- 112th Air Refueling Group emblem
- Active: 1942–1993
- Country: United States
- Branch: Air National Guard
- Type: Group
- Role: Aerial Refueling
- Part of: Pennsylvania Air National Guard
- Garrison/HQ: Pittsburgh IAP Air Reserve Station, Pennsylvania

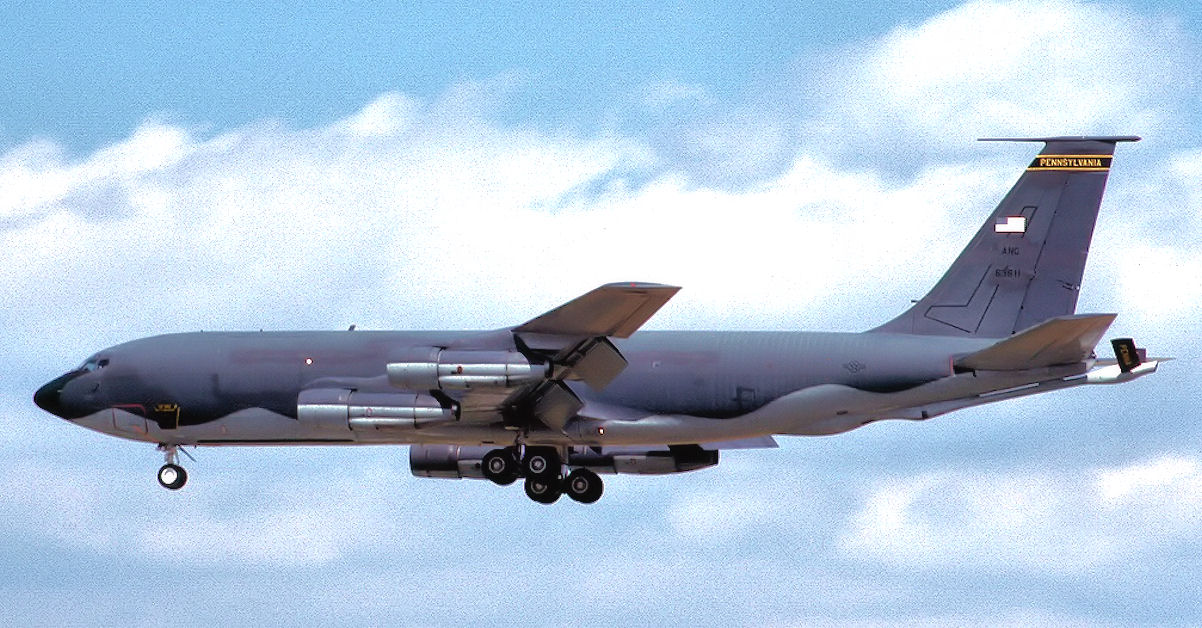
146th Air Refueling Squadron KC-135

The 112th Air Refueling Group (112 ARG) is an inactive unit of the Pennsylvania Air National Guard, stationed at Pittsburgh IAP Air Reserve Station, Pennsylvania. It was inactivated on 1 October 1993.

== History ==
=== World War II ===
See 350th Fighter Group for extended World War II history

The group's air echelon was activated in England under Eighth Air Force. It was equipped with export versions of the P-39 Airacobra originally ordered for the French Air Force. By the summer of 1942 the number of American pilot volunteers in the Royal Air Force serving in England had grown to a few hundred in number. In urgent need of additional fighters to support the forthcoming North African invasion, American planners decided to combine these two assets already in England and at the end of September 1942 a number of American pilots in the RAF were invited to transfer to the USAAF.

Deployed from England to Port Lyautey Airfield, French Morocco, during the period 3 Jan to 28 February 1943. The Ground Echelon, finally joined each other at Oujda Airfield, French Morocco, a few days after their arrival in North Africa on 3 January 1943. The Ground Echelon had arrived off North Africa in the first week of November 1942 from the United States with the Operation Torch invasion fleet.

The group operated with Twelfth Air Force from January 1943 until the end of the war, flying patrol and interception missions, protecting convoys, escorting aircraft, flying reconnaissance missions, engaging in interdiction operations, and providing close support for ground forces. It operated against targets in Tunisia until the end of that campaign. The Group flew air defense and fighter- bomber missions with its P-39 Airacobras and primarily fighter bomber missions with its P-47 Thunderbolts.

The 350th FG moved to the port of embarkation at Naples, Italy, on 14 July 1945. On 1 August 1945, the group sailed for combat operations in the Pacific Theater. The atomic bombs were dropped on Japan while the Group was en route and provisioning in Panama City on the Pacific Ocean side of the Canal Zone. V-J day was declared, signaling the end of hostilities in World War II. The ship carrying the Group was directed to return to the US and the 350th Fighter Group and its American Squadrons were inactivated on 7 November 1945, at Seymour Johnson Field, Goldsboro, NC, after 3 years and one month of operations. The inactivation was to last less than a year.

=== Pennsylvania Air National Guard ===
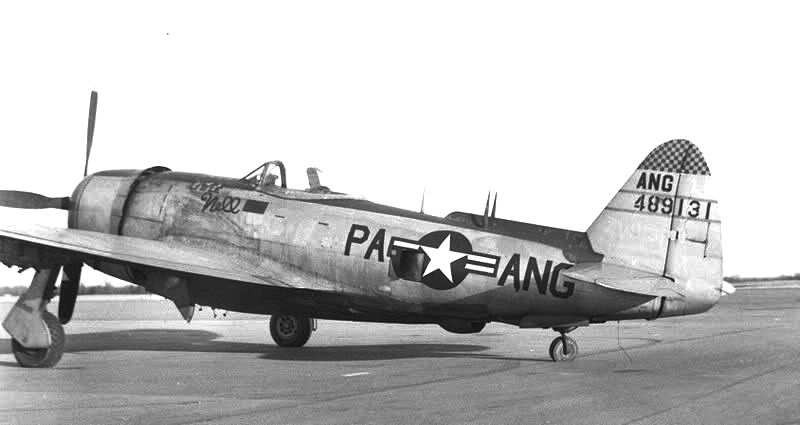
112th Fighter Group F-47N 44-8913 at Pittsburgh Airport

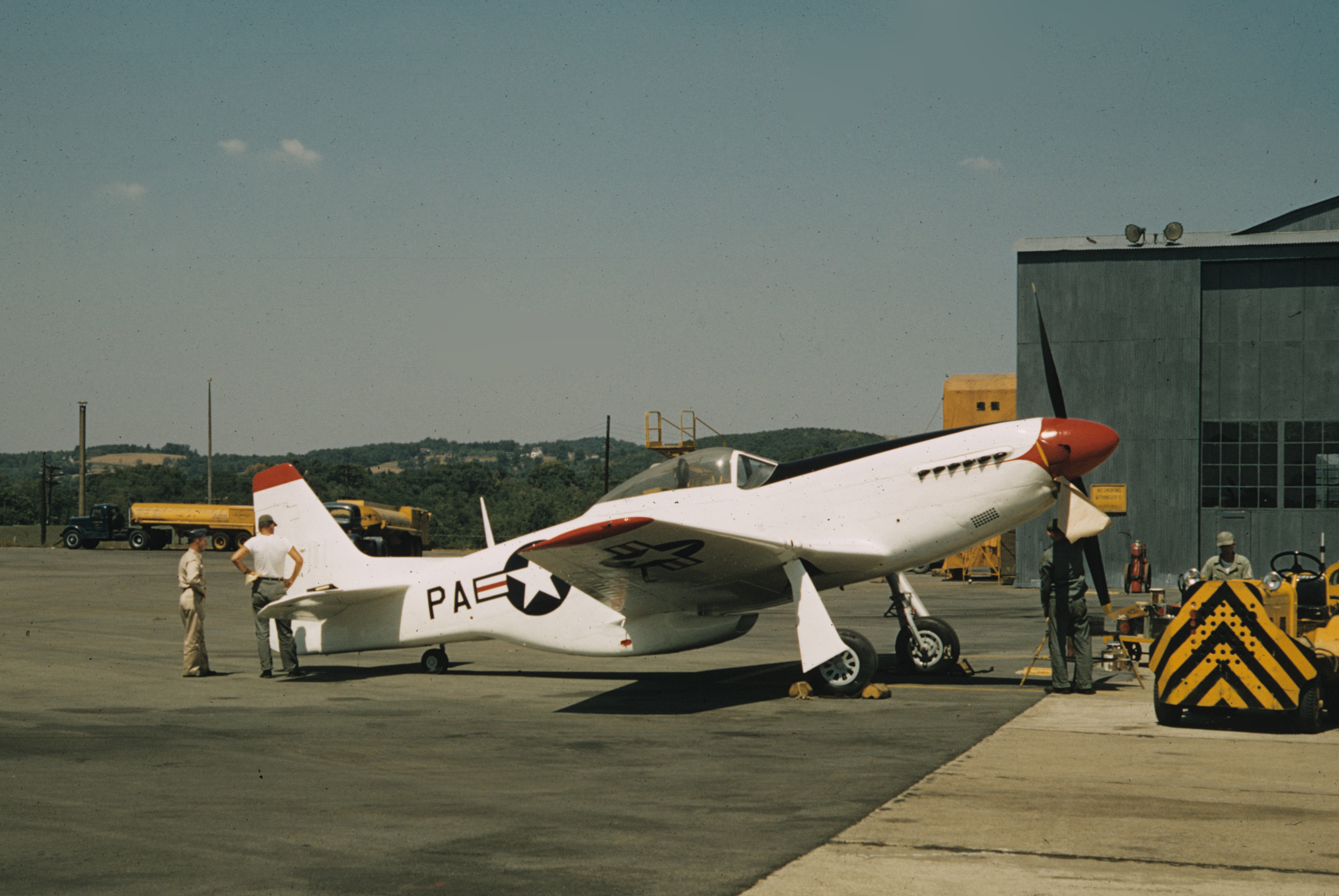
F-51D of the 148th Fighter Squadron, Reading Pennsylvania ANG, 1955.

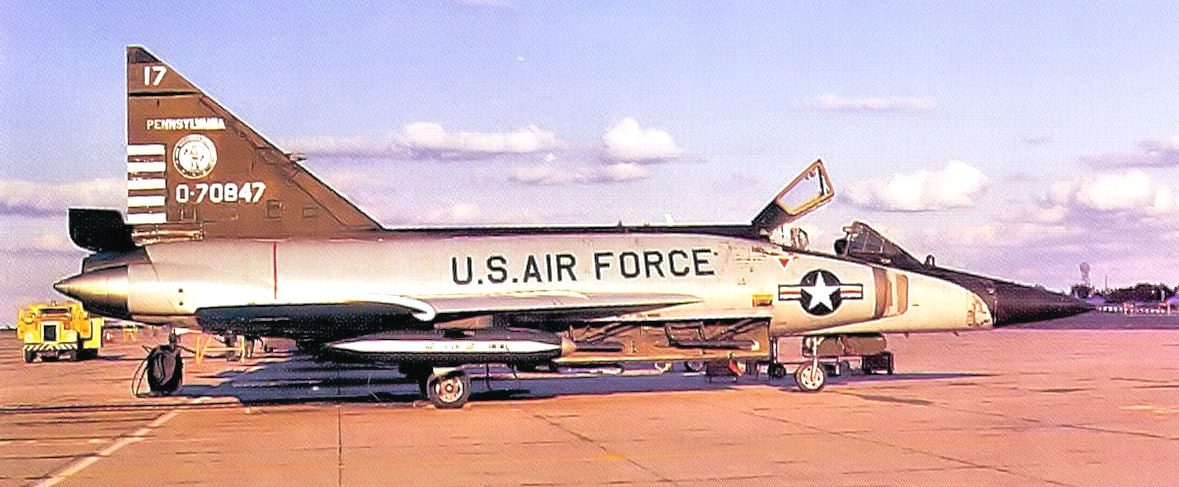
F-102A 57-0847, 146th FIS, about 1970

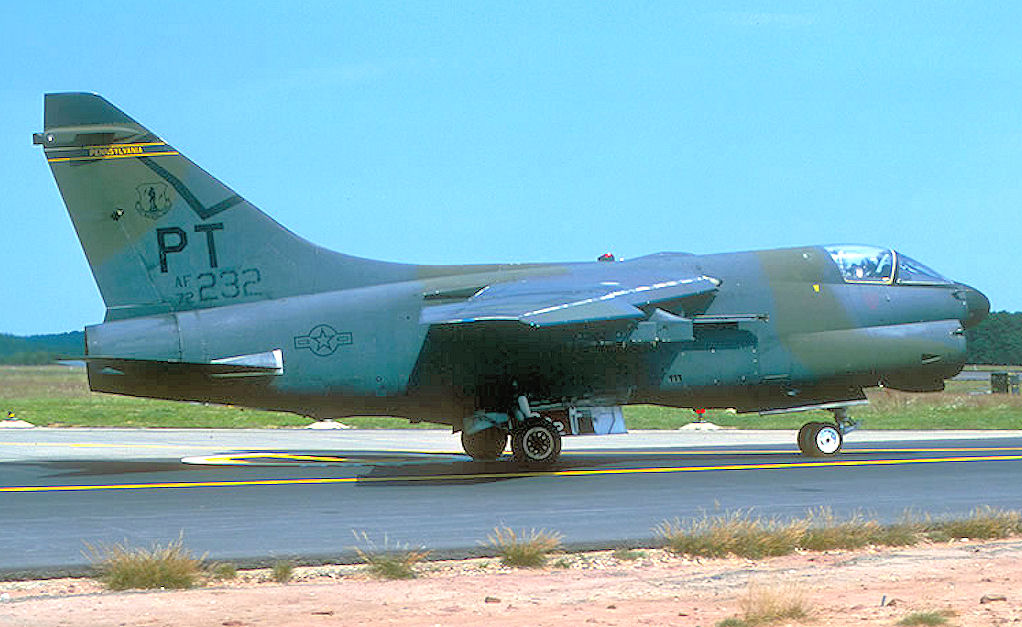
146th TFS A-7D 72-0232

The wartime 350th Fighter Group was re-designated as the 112th Fighter Group and was allotted to the Pennsylvania Air National Guard on 24 May 1946. It was organized at the Greater Pittsburgh Airport and was extended federal recognition on 22 April 1949 by the National Guard Bureau. The 112th Fighter Group was bestowed the history, honors, and colors of the 350th Fighter Group. The wartime 345th FS became the 146th Fighter Squadron, the 346th FS became the 147th Fighter Squadron and the 347th FS was re-designated the 148th Fighter Squadron, and assigned to Spaatz Field at Reading.

The 146th and 147th would have an air defense mission over Pittsburgh and western Pennsylvania; the 148th would fly air defense over the Philadelphia and eastern Pennsylvania. The Pittsburgh squadrons flew F-47N Thunderbolts and the 148th FS at Reading flew F-51D Mustangs. The group was assigned to the PA ANG 53d Fighter Wing

In February 1951 the 148th FS at Reading was activated for the Korean War, along with the 111th Bombardment Group at Philadelphia, leaving the 112th and the 146th and 147th Fighter Squadrons at Pittsburgh with the air defense mission for the entire commonwealth.

At the end of 1951, the activated units at Reading and Philadelphia returned to Pennsylvania control. The F-47s were retired and the squadrons re-equipped with F-51H Mustangs, due to the lack of jets which were being used in Korea. After the Korean War ended, originally it was planned to convert the 146th FBS from its propeller-driven F-51Hs to F-86A Sabre jet interceptors, but after receiving four Sabres, the squadron began to receive new F-84F Thunderstreaks in October 1954. The 147th switched from its F-51Hs to F-84Fs in July 1955.

In July 1955, the group was again re-designated, this time as the 112th Fighter-Interceptor Group, reflecting the Pennsylvania ANG's mission to counter the threat of Soviet bombers. In December 1957, the 146th replaced their F-84Fs with F-86D Sabre Interceptors, and the 147th followed in early 1958 receiving F-86L Sabre Interceptors.

At Reading, by 1956 the 148th Fighter Squadron F-51Ds were reaching the end of their service life and the Air Force was phasing the Mustang out of the inventory. In an effort to upgrade to an all jet fighter force, the Air Force required Air National Guard Air Defense Command units to upgrade to jet-powered aircraft. Tests of operating F-84Fs at Spaatz Field had shown that the runways at the airport were too short to operate jet fighters safely from the runways, and the Reading Airport Commission and Air National Guard authorities found themselves in a conflict over the use of Reading Municipal Airport for tactical jet operations.

Unable to resolve these differences the Air Force inactivated the 148th Fighter-Interceptor Squadron on 30 June 1956. It was subsequently re-designated the 140th Aeromedical Transport Squadron and reactivated at Spaatz Field as a new organization of the PA ANG, equipped with propeller-driven C-46 Commandos. The 148th's its lineage and history were bestowed on the new squadron. With the inactivation of the 148th, the 103d Fighter-Interceptor Squadron at Philadelphia took up the air defense mission of the eastern part of the commonwealth.

Beginning in 1960, the 112th Fighter Interceptor Group upgraded to the supersonic F-102A Delta Dagger interceptor. These Air Guard pilots stood runway alert for 24 hours a day, seven days a week at the Greater Pittsburgh Airport ready to scramble regardless of the weather conditions to intercept any unidentified aircraft approaching southward from the Canada–US border or toward the United States from the Atlantic Coast, their F-102A Delta Daggers fully armed with two heat seeking missiles and four radar-guided missiles as well as 2.75-inch rockets.

With air defense becoming less critical in the early 1960s, the 103d FIS at Philadelphia moved to an Air Transport mission in 1962. In February 1961, the 171st Air Transport Group was formed at Greater Pittsburgh Airport flying the C-121 Constellation as a component of the Military Air Transport Service (MATS). Upon formation, the 147th Fighter-Interceptor Squadron was reassigned from the 112th FIG and re-designated as the 147th Air Transport Squadron, becoming the operational squadron of the new 171st ATG. The 146th FIS remained with the 112th FIG at Pittsburgh thus became the last Air Defense squadron in the PA Air National Guard.

In 1975 the 112th ended its air defense mission, receiving its first A-7D Corsair II aircraft and was reassigned to the Tactical Air Command. In 1991 with the retirement of the A-7D, the 112th Tactical Fighter Group became the 112th Air Refueling Group (ARG) under Strategic Air Command, receiving KC-135 Stratotankers that it operated jointly with the 171st, which had become an air refueling Wing at Pittsburgh in October 1972.

Strategic Air Command was inactivated in June 1992 and the 112th ARG became a part of the Air Mobility Command (AMC). On 1 October 1993, with both the 112th Air Refueling Group and the 171st Air Refueling Wing at Pittsburgh, the two tanker units were consolidated with the 146th Air Refueling Squadron being reassigned to the 171st Operations Group and once again reuniting with the 147th under the same group. The 112th Air Refueling Group was inactivated.

=== Lineage ===
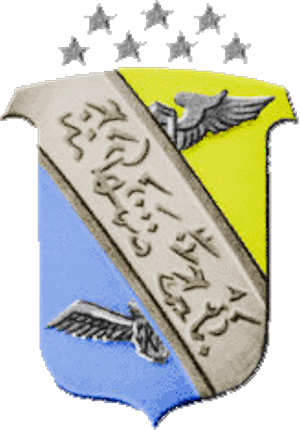
World War II 350th Fighter Group emblem

- Activated in England on 1 October 1942 by special authority granted to Eighth Air Force prior to constitution as 350th Fighter Group on 2 October 1942

Inactivated on 7 November 1945

- Re-designated: 112th Fighter Group, and allotted to Pennsylvania ANG on 24 May 1946

Extended federal recognition on 22 April 1949
Re-designated: 112th Fighter-Bomber Group, 1 November 1952
Re-designated: 112th Fighter-Interceptor Group, 1 July 1955
Re-designated: 112th Tactical Fighter Group, 1 July 1975
Re-designated: 112th Air Refueling Group, 16 October 1991
Inactivated: 1 October 1993

=== Assignments ===
- Eighth Air Force, 1 October 1942
- VIII Fighter Command, 2 October 1942 – 6 January 1943
- Twelfth Air Force, 6 January 1943 – 14 July 1945
- III Fighter Command, 25 August – 7 November 1945
- 53d Fighter Wing, 22 April 1949
- 111th Air Defense Wing, 1 November 1950
- Pennsylvania Air National Guard, 1 July 1956

Gained by: Eastern Air Defense Force, Air Defense Command
Gained by: Syracuse Air Defense Sector, Air Defense Command, 8 January 1957
Gained by: 26th Air Division, Air Defense Command, 4 September 1963
Gained by: 34th Air Division, Air Defense Command, 1 April 1966
Gained by: 34th Air Division, Aerospace Defense Command, 15 January 1968
Gained by: 20th Air Division, Aerospace Defense Command, 1 January 1970
Gained by: Tactical Air Command, 1 July 1978
Gained by: Eighth Air Force, Strategic Air Command, 16 October 1991
Gained by: Air Mobility Command, 1 June 1992 – 1 October 1993

=== Components ===
- 146th Fighter (later Fighter-Bomber, Fighter-Interceptor, Tactical Fighter, Air Refueling) Squadron, 22 April 1949 – 1 October 1993
- 147th Fighter (later Fighter-Bomber, Fighter-Interceptor) Squadron, 22 April 1949 – 1 February 1961
- 148th Fighter (later Fighter-Bomber, Fighter-Interceptor) Squadron, 22 April 1949 – 10 February 1951; 1 November 1952 – 30 June 1956 (GSU at Reading MAP)
- 345th Fighter Squadron: 1 October 1942 – 7 November 1945
- 346th Fighter Squadron: 1 October 1942 – 7 November 1945
- 347th Fighter Squadron: 1 October 1942 – 7 November 1945
- Brazilian 1st Fighter Squadron, October 1944 – May 1945

=== Stations ===
- RAF Bushey Hall (AAF-341), England, 1 October 1942
- RAF Duxford (AAF-357), England, October 1942
- Oujda Airfield, French Morocco, 6 January 1943
- Oran Es Sénia Airport, Oran, Algeria, 14 February 1943
- Maison Blanche Airport, Algiers, Algeria, May 1943
- Rerhaia Airfield, Algeria, c. 17 July 1943
- Sardinia, 5 November 1943
- Corsica, 6 February 1944
- Tarquinia Airfield, Italy, 8 September 1944
- Pisa Airfield, Italy, 2 December 1944 – 14 July 1945
- Seymour Johnson Field, North Carolina, 25 August – 7 November 1945
- Greater Pittsburgh (later Greater Pittsburgh International) Airport, 22 April 1949

Designated: Pittsburgh IAP Air Reserve Station, 1991-Present

=== Aircraft ===
- P-39 Airacobra, 1942–1944
- P-400 Airacobra, 1942–1944
- P-38 Lightning, 1943
- P-47 Thunderbolt, 1944–1945
- F-47N Thunderbolt, 1949–1951
- F-51D Mustang, 1949–1951; 1952–1956
- F-51H Mustang, 1951–1954
- F-84C Thunderjet, 1951–1952
- F-86A Sabre, 1954
- F-84F Thunderstreak, 1954–1957
- F-86D Sabre Interceptor, 1957–1960
- F-86L Sabre Interceptor, 1958–1960
- F-102 Delta Dagger, 1960–1975
- A-7D Corsair II, 1975–1991
- KC-135E Stratotanker, 1991–1993
