= 147th Air Refueling Squadron =

Pennsylvania Air National Guard unit

147th Air Refueling Squadron

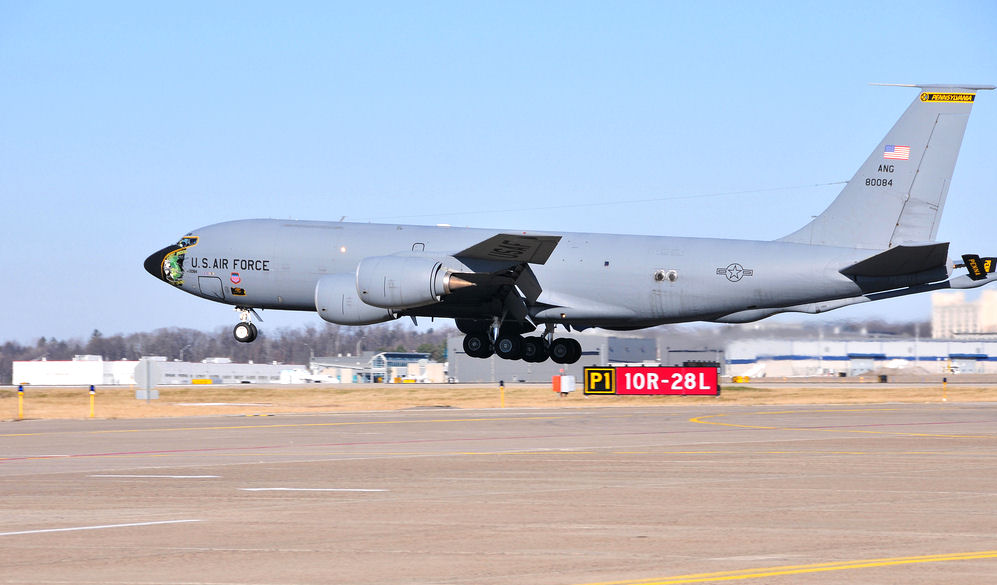
- 171st Air Refueling Wing KC-135T Stratotanker landing at Pittsburgh ANGB (Note: Aircraft is Boeing KC-135T-BN Stratotanker, serial 58-0084.)
- Active: 1942–1945; 1949–present
- Country: United States
- Allegiance: Pennsylvania
- Branch: Air National Guard
- Type: Squadron
- Role: Aerial refueling
- Part of: Pennsylvania Air National Guard
- Garrison/HQ: Pittsburgh IAP Air Reserve Station, Pennsylvania
- Engagements: European Theater of Operations
- Decorations: Distinguished Unit Citation

Insignia
- 147th Air Refueling Squadron emblem

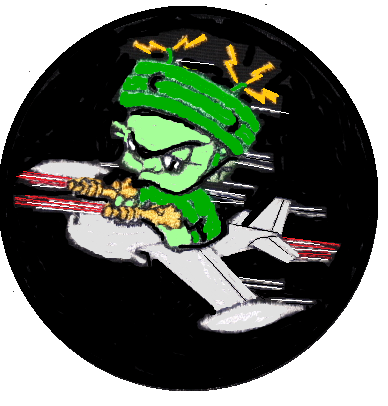
- 147th Fighter-Interceptor Squadron emblem (Note: The plane is piloted by a Martian ("little green man") firing ray guns. His name is Ovacron, and he was apparently created by a Pittsburgh disc jockey in the 1950s. Anonymous (23 July 2018). "147th Fighter Interceptor Squadron, Pennsylvania Air Guard". The Jive Bomber.)

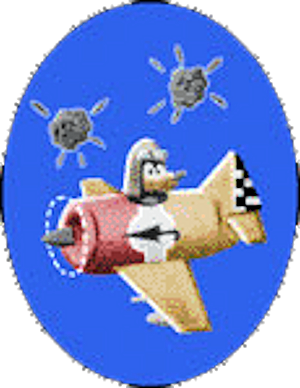
- Unofficial 346th Fighter Squadron emblem

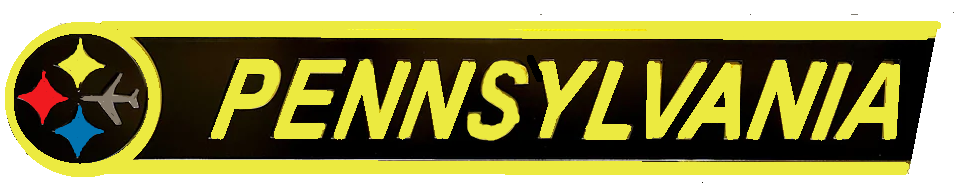
- Tail stripe

The 147th Air Refueling Squadron is a unit of the Pennsylvania Air National Guard 171st Air Refueling Wing located at Pittsburgh IAP Air Reserve Station, Pennsylvania. The 147th is equipped with the KC-135T Stratotanker.

== History ==
=== World War II ===
The squadron was activated on 1 October 1942 at RAF Duxford, England by Eighth Air Force through by special authority of the Army Air Forces before it was constituted. The squadron became part of VIII Fighter Command, and drew its cadre from the 31st and 52d Fighter Groups, and Americans transferred from the Royal Air Force who had volunteered to join the RAF prior to the United States entry into the European War, 11 December 1941.

The squadron was initially equipped with an export/Lend-Lease version of P-39D Airacobra, designated Airacobra I by the RAF with additional aircraft that had been sold to France that been impounded by the British after the fall of France. These aircraft were designated as the P-400. It deployed to French Morocco, where it became part of Twelfth Air Force and engaged in combat during the North African campaign. It was briefly equipped with Lockheed P-38 Lightnings between June and September 1943. Each squadron of the 350th Fighter Group was assigned two P-38s to intercept and destroy high flying Luftwaffe reconnaissance aircraft sent to photograph the allied invasion fleet gathering along the North African coast for the Operation Husky, the invasion of Sicily.

The squadron re-equipped with P-47D Thunderbolts in January 1944 and engaged in combat during the Italian campaign. It also provided air cover for Allied landings on Elba in June 1944 and supported the Operation Dragoon, the invasion of southern France in August. The squadron then returned to Italy and fought in the Po Valley until the end of the European War in May 1945.

=== Pennsylvania Air National Guard ===
The 346th Squadron was redesignated as the 147th Fighter Squadron, and was allotted to the National Guard on 24 May 1946. It was organized at Greater Pittsburgh Airport and was extended federal recognition on 22 April 1949. The squadron was equipped with Republic F-47D Thunderbolts and was assigned to the 112th Fighter Group.

==== Air Defense ====
The 147th Fighter Squadron's mission was air defense over Pittsburgh and western Pennsylvania. It was not activated during the Korean War. The squadron retired its F-47s in 1951 was re-equipped with long-distance North American F-51H Mustang interceptors, because jets were being used by the active duty force and in Korea. After the Korean War ended the squadron began to receive new Republic F-84F Thunderstreaks in July 1955. In January 1958, the 147th replaced their F-84Fs with all-weather North American F-86L Sabre interceptors.

==== Aeromedical airlift ====
On 1 February 1961, the 147th expanded to a group level, and the 171st Air Transport Group was established. The 147th was transferred from the 112th Fighter-Interceptor Group to become the 171st's flying squadron. Other elements assigned into the group were the 171st Material Squadron, 171st Support Squadron and the 171st USAF Dispensary. The 147th Aeromedical Transport Squadron converted to twin engine Fairchild C-119J Flying Boxcar aircraft and began training for its new mission of aeromedical evacuation. After two years with the C-119J, the 147th converted to the Lockheed C-121G Super Constellation. With the Super Constellation the primary mission of the 147th was airlift, with a secondary mission of aeromedical evacuation.

In 1968, the unit was redesignated the 147th Aeromedical Airlift Squadron, one of the first of its kind in the Air National Guard. Later that year, the 171st was called to active duty to augment the airlift capability of the 375th Aeromedical Airlift Wing at Scott Air Force Base, Illinois. At Scott the squadron flew Convair C-131 Samaritan aircraft. Its mission was to move patients from rough combat airfield casualty staging bases and military installations in South Vietnam to destination treatment hospitals. The Group flew 35% of these missions, flying 510 sorties and airlifting 11,947 patients. The unit was finally released from active duty in December 1968 and returned to Pennsylvania control.

==== Air refueling ====
Conforming to the new policy of the Department of Defense, the ANG began to play an even greater role in fulfilling total U.S. force requirements. An extensive reorganization of the National Guard system was accomplished. As a result of these actions, the 171st Aeromedical Airlift Group became part of the 171st Air Refueling Wing in October 1972 and the 147th Air Refueling Squadron transitioned from the C-121G to the Boeing KC-97L Stratotanker.

On 1 July 1976, the Wing received notice that Strategic Air Command (SAC) would become its new mobilization gaining command. A year later, the Wing transitioned to the Boeing KC-135A Stratotanker, a four-engine jet aircraft. This was a significant upgrade, increasing the squadron's air refueling capacity and expanding its global mission capability. In 1982, the ANG increased its mission capability through an interim program by retrofitting commercial Boeing 707 engines to their tankers redesignating the aircraft to the KC-135E.

Members of the 147th volunteered for duty in Saudi Arabia in order to participate in air refueling missions for Operation Desert Shield. In December 1990 the entire unit was activated and called to federal service, an activation that lasted through May 1991. During this period over 300 members of the unit were deployed throughout the world in numerous functions supporting both Desert Shield and combat operations during Operation Desert Storm. During this period the squadron's parent wing refueled nearly 3,000 allied aircraft while stationed near the Iraqi border in support of air combat missions against Iraqi forces. Maintaining a remarkable 100% mission effectiveness rate, the 171st flew 556 combat missions and offloaded 4.6 million gallons of fuel during the 1991 Gulf War.

==== Post Cold War era ====
SAC was inactivated in June 1992 and Air Combat Command became the 147th's gaining command. On 1 October 1993 the two refueling headquarters at Pittsburgh, the 112th Air Refueling Group and the 171st Air Refueling Wing, were combined and the 146th Air Refueling Squadron joined the 147th in the same group. With the consolidation, The 171st wing consisted of 16 aircraft assigned to two squadrons, making it one of only three "super tanker wings" in the Air National Guard.

In May 1999, the 171st wing activated over 500 members and fourteen aircraft to Budapest, Hungary and Frankfurt, Germany, in support of Operation Allied Force deterring ethnic aggression in Yugoslavia. Deployed 147th guardsmen became part of the 171st Expeditionary Operations Group that flew 411 sorties and refueled 2,157 receivers. All members returned home by the beginning of July 1999.

In November 2000, the 171st deployed 228 personnel to Istres Air Base, France in support of Operation Joint Forge, a NATO-led stabilization mission in Bosnia-Herzegovina. During this deployment the crews flew 51 sorties in seven KC-135s, and offloaded 1.4 million pounds of fuel.

==== Global War on Terrorism ====
The 147th found itself among the first units called to duty after the September 11 attacks in New York City, Washington DC and its own backyard in southwestern Pennsylvania with the hijacking and crash of United Airlines Flight 93. At the time, almost all of the wing's aircraft were in a stand-down mode, while they were converted with the Pacer Crag cockpit and navigation upgrade.

Within minutes of the first aircraft crashes, the 171st wing was airborne with its only flyable KC-135E. Its mission was to provide aerial refueling to the fuel-thirsty jet fighter aircraft that were providing Combat Air Patrols (CAP) over the skies of the eastern United States as part of Operation Noble Eagle. On the ground back in Pittsburgh, the maintainers and aircrews made more aircraft airworthy. The unit went into a wartime footing. Within 24 hours after the first attacks, the 171st wing was flying round-the-clock CAPs support sorties with eight Fully Mission Capable KC-135s. Before the continuous CAP missions were ended in early 2002, more than 13,000 combat missions were flown over U.S. soil.

During the first decade of the 2000s, the unit engaged in combat operations in supporting Operation Enduring Freedom, Operation Noble Eagle, Operation Iraqi Freedom, deployed to Guam, participated in the Hurricane Katrina Relief Effort, supported numerous Raven assignments, supported our AEF cycles and other missions.

In an effort to support the international response to the unrest in Libya and enforcement of United Nations Security Council Resolution 1973 of a no-fly zone over Libya, the 313th Air Expeditionary Wing, with the 171st wing as the lead unit, was stood up in March 2011 by a blend of active duty, guard and reserve airmen. A total of 1500 sorties, 11000 flying hours, and 70 million pounds of fuel transferred aircraft from more than ten countries was accomplished by this citizen-airmen volunteer militia force. Initially, the operation for the no-fly zone was called Operation Odyssey Dawn. As it transitioned to a full-fledged, NATO-led effort, it became Operation Unified Protector. OUP officially ended 31 October 2011.

== Lineage ==
147th Aeromedical Airlift Squadron

- Activated on 1 October 1942 by special authority granted to Eighth Air Force prior to constitution as the 346th Fighter Squadron on 2 October 1942

Inactivated on 7 November 1945
Redesignated 147th Fighter Squadron, Single Engine and allotted to the National Guard on 24 May 1946
Extended federal recognition on 22 April 1949
Redesignated 147th Fighter-Interceptor Squadron on 1 October 1952
Redesignated 147th Fighter-Bomber Squadron on 1 December 1952
Redesignated 147th Fighter-Interceptor Squadron on 1 July 1955
Redesignated 147th Aeromedical Transport Squadron, Light on 1 May 1961
Redesignated 147th Air Transport Squadron, Heavy on 1 February 1964
Redesignated 147th Military Airlift Squadron on 1 January 1966
Federalized and placed on active duty on 13 May 1968
Redesignated 147th Aeromedical Airift Squadron on 19 February 1968
Released from active duty and returned to Pennsylvania control on 12 December 1968
Inactivated on 3 October 1972
Consolidated with the 147th Air Refueling Squadron on 18 August 1987

147th Air Refueling Squadron

- Constituted as the 147th Air Refueling Squadron on 30 May 1972

Activated on 4 October 1972
Redesignated 147th Air Refueling Squadron, Heavy on 1 July 1977
Consolidated with the 147th Aeromedical Airlift Squadron on 18 August 1987
Federalized and placed on active duty on 15 December 1990
Released from active duty and returned to Pennsylvania control on 31 May 1991
Redesignated 147th Air Refueling Squadron on 16 March 1992

=== Assignments ===
- 350th Fighter Group, 2 October 1942 – 7 November 1945
- 112th Fighter Group (later 112th Fighter-Bomber Group, 112th Fighter-Interceptor Group), 22 April 1949
- 171st Air Transport Group (later 171st Military Airlift Group, 171st Aeromedical Airlift Group), 1 February 1961 – 3 October 1972
- 171st Air Refueling Group (later 171st Air Refueling Wing), 4 October 1972 (attached to 1709th Air Refueling Wing (Provisional), 15 December 1990 – 31 May 1991)
- 171st Operations Group, 1 October 1993 – present

=== Stations ===
- RAF Bushey Hall (AAF-341), England, 1 October 1942
- RAF Duxford (AAF-357), England, October 1942
- Oujda Airfield, French Morocco, 6 January 1943
- Oran Es Sénia Airport, Algeria, 14 February 1943
- Maison Blanche Airport, Algeria, May 1943
- Rerhaia Airfield, Algeria, c. 17 July 1943
- Sardinia, 5 November 1943
- Corsica, 6 February 1944
- Tarquinia Airfield, Italy, 8 September 1944
- Pisa Airfield, Italy, 2 December 1944 – 14 July 1945
- Seymour Johnson Field, North Carolina, 25 August – 7 November 1945
- Greater Pittsburgh (later Greater Pittsburgh International) Airport, Pittsburgh IAP Air Reserve Station, 22 April 1949 – present

Operated from: Scott Air Force Base, Illinois, 13 May-12 December 1968
Operated from: King Abdul Aziz Air Base, Jeddah, Saudi Arabia, 15 December 1990 – 31 May 1991

=== Aircraft ===
- Bell P-39 Airacobra, 1942–1944
- P-400 Airacobra, 1942–1944
- Lockkheer P-38 Lightning, 1943
- Republic P-47 (later F-47) Thunderbolt, 1944–1945, 1949–1951
- North American F-51H Mustang, 1951–1955
- F-84F Thunderstreak, 1955–1958
- F-86L Sabre Interceptor, 1958–1961
- C-119J Flying Boxcar, 1961–1963
- C-121G Super Constellation, 1963–1972
- C-131 Samaritan, 1968
- KC-97L Stratotanker, 1972–1977
- KC-135A Stratotanker, 1977–1982
- KC-135E Stratotanker, 1982–2004
- KC-135T Stratotanker, 2004–present
