= 146th Air Refueling Squadron =

Pennsylvania Air National Guard unit

146th Air Refueling Squadron

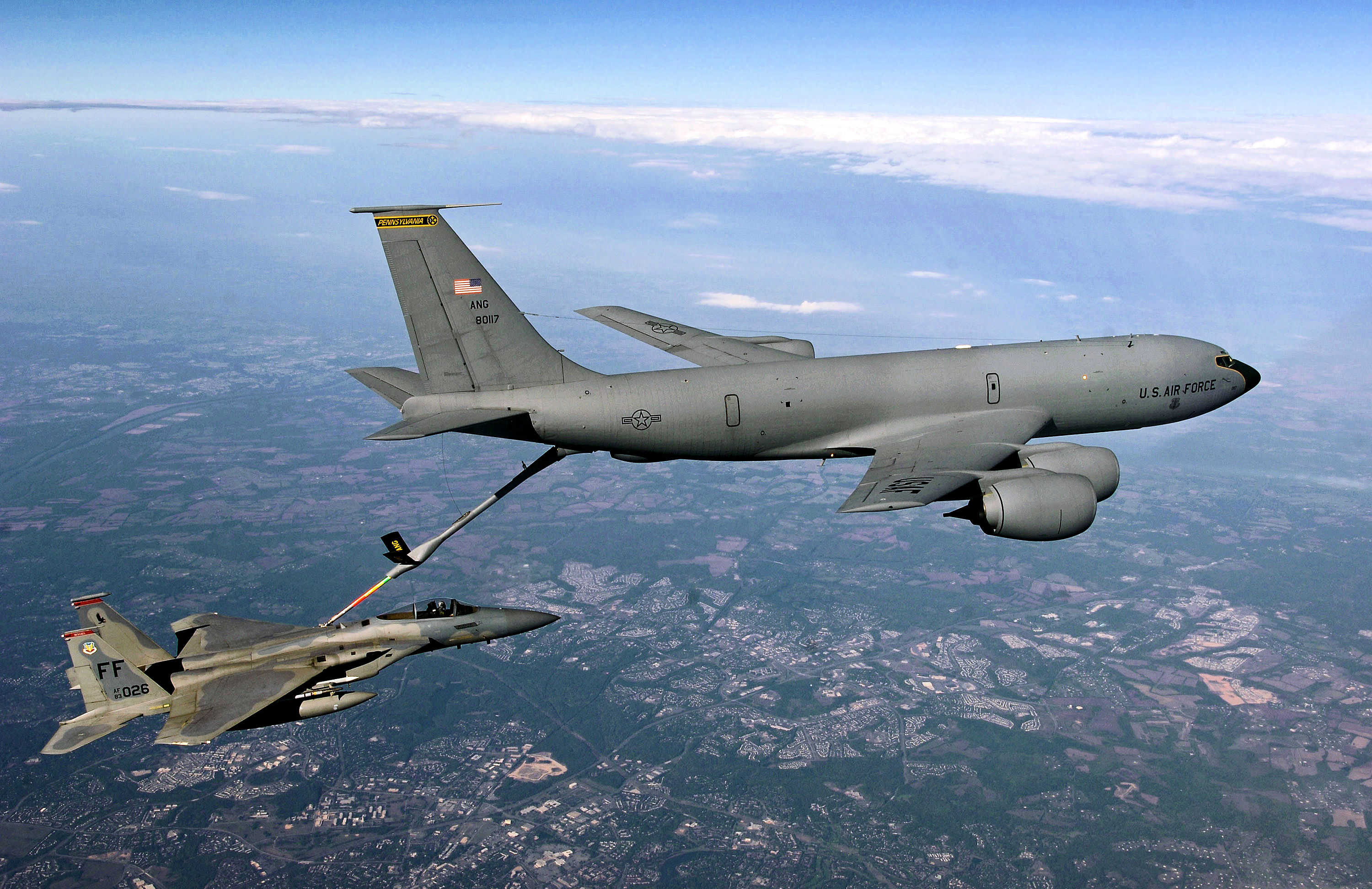
- 171 ARW KC-135T refueling an F-15C during Operation Noble Eagle (Note: Aircraft is a Boeing KC-135T Stratotanker, serial 58-0117, taken in 2002.)
- Active: 1942–1945; 1948–present
- Country: United States
- Allegiance: Pennsylvania
- Branch: Air National Guard
- Type: Squadron
- Role: Aerial refueling
- Part of: Pennsylvania Air National Guard
- Garrison/HQ: Pittsburgh IAP Air Reserve Station, Pennsylvania
- Motto: "Pride Vigilance Honor"
- Engagements: European Theater of Operations
- Decorations: Distinguished Unit Citation

Insignia
- 146th Air Refueling Squadron emblem

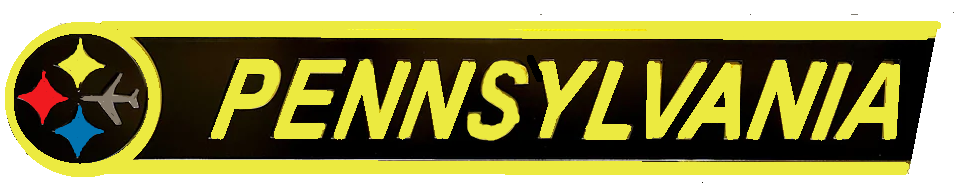
- Tail stripe

The 146th Air Refueling Squadron is a unit of the Pennsylvania Air National Guard 's 171st Air Refueling Wing located at Pittsburgh IAP Air Reserve Station, Pennsylvania. The 146th is equipped with the KC-135T Stratotanker.

== History ==
=== World War II ===
The squadron was activated on 1 October 1942 at RAF Duxford, England as the 345th Fighter Squadron. It was initially assigned to VIII Fighter Command, but was reassigned to Twelfth Air Force in December and engaged in combat in the North African Campaign and was later based in Italy as part of the Mediterranean Theater of Operations. It engaged in combat during Sicilian and Italian Campaigns. The squadron also flew combat missions from Sardinia and in the Rhone Valley of France from 1944.

=== Pennsylvania Air National Guard ===
The 345th Fighter Squadron was redesignated as the 146th Fighter Squadron, and was allotted to the National Guard on 24 May 1946. It was organized at Greater Pittsburgh Airport and was extended federal recognition on 22 April 1949. The squadron was equipped with F-47D Thunderbolts and was assigned to the 112th Fighter Group.

==== Air Defense ====
The 146th Fighter Squadron's mission was air defense over Pittsburgh and western Pennsylvania. The unit was not activated during the Korean War. The squadron retired its F-47s in 1951 was re-equipped with long-distance F-51H Mustang interceptors, because jets which were being used by the active duty force and in Korea. After the Korean War ended, it was planned to convert the 146th Fighter-Bomber Squadron from its propeller-driven F-51Hs to F-86A Sabre jet daylight interceptors. However, after receiving four Sabres, the squadron began to receive new F-84F Thunderstreaks in October 1954. In December 1957, the 146th replaced their F-84Fs with all-weather F-86D Sabre Interceptors.

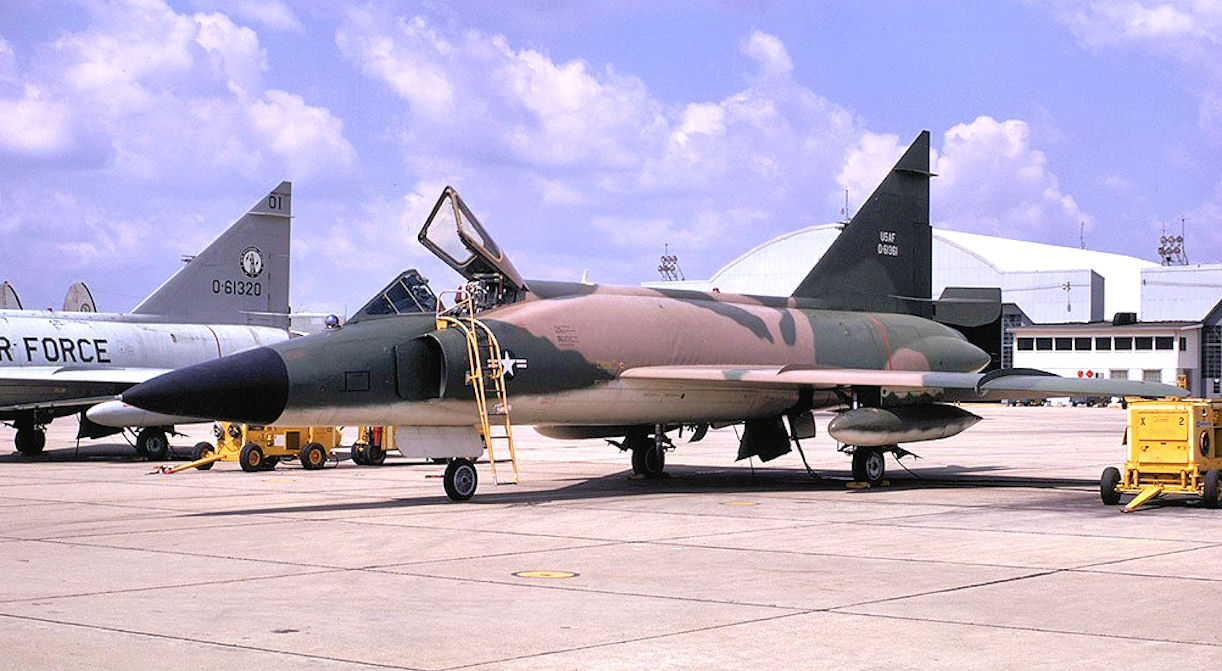
F-102A 56-1361 in Vietnam War jungle camouflage, 1968

Beginning in 1960, Air Defense Command upgraded the 112th Fighter Interceptor Group to the supersonic F-102A Delta Dagger interceptor. Squadron pilots stood runway alert for 24 hours a day, seven days a week at the Greater Pittsburgh Airport ready to scramble regardless of the weather conditions to intercept any unidentified aircraft approaching southward from the Canada–US border or toward the United States from the Atlantic Coast. Their F-102A Delta Daggers were armed with two heat-seeking missiles and four radar-guided missiles as well as 2.75-inch rockets.

==== Tactical Air Command ====
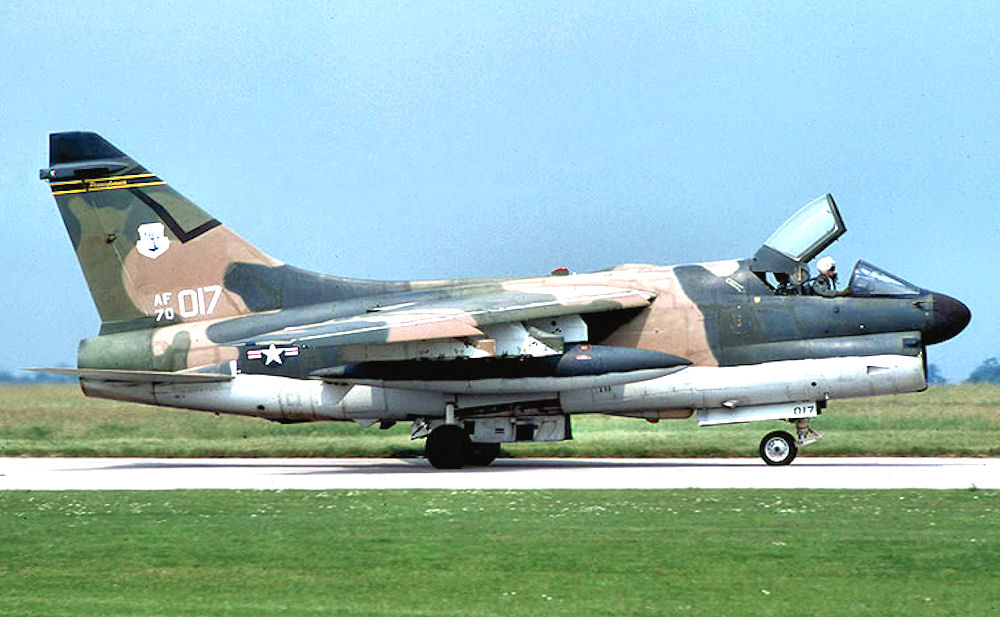
A-7D 70-1017 about 1976

With air defense becoming less critical, in 1975 the 146th ended its air defense mission, receiving its first A-7D Corsair II aircraft and its mobilization gaining command changed to Tactical Air Command. The principal mission of the squadron became the destruction of targets in support of ground forces. The A-7Ds were initially received from the 354th and 355th Tactical Fighter Wings, which were being upgraded with new A-10A Thunderbolt II aircraft. Beginning in 1976 and 1977, new A-7Ds were received directly from the manufacturer, and in 1980, the squadron received some A-7K two-seat trainers.

==== Air Refueling ====
By the end of the 1980s the A-7Ds were being retired from the Air Force inventory, and in 1991 the 146th traded in its ground support fighters. The 112th group's gaining command became Strategic Air Command as it became a KC-135 Stratotanker air refueling squadron. The 146th has continued this mission into the present day. The tankers were operated jointly with the 147th Air Refueling Squadron at Pittsburgh. The 147th's parent unit, the 171st Air Refueling Wing, had become an air refueling organization in October 1972. Strategic Air Command was inactivated in June 1992 and the 112th Air Refueling Group became a part of the Air Combat Command (ACC). On 1 October 1993, the assets of the 112th Air Refueling Group and the 171st Air Refueling Wing at Pittsburgh were combined and the 146th Air Refueling Squadron was reassigned to the 171st Operations Group. The 112th Air Refueling Group was inactivated. With the consolidation, The 171st Air Refueling Wing had 16 aircraft assigned to two squadrons, making it one of only three "Super Tanker Wings" within the Air National Guard.

==== Post Cold War era ====
In May 1999, the 171st activated over 500 members and fourteen aircraft to Budapest, Hungary and Frankfurt, Germany, in support of Operation Allied Force deterring ethnic aggression in Yugoslavia. The 146th became part of the 171st Expeditionary Operations Group that flew 411 sorties and refueled 2,157 receivers. All members returned home by the beginning of July 1999.

In November 2000, the 171st deployed 228 personnel to Istres Air Base, France in support of Operation Joint Forge, a NATO-led stabilization mission in Bosnia-Herzegovina. During this deployment the crews flew 51 sorties in seven of our KC-135s, and offloaded 1.4 million pounds of fuel.

==== Global War on Terrorism ====
The 171st found itself among the first units called to duty almost immediately after the 9/11 terrorist attacks in New York City, Washington, D.C., and in its own backyard in southwestern Pennsylvania. At the time of the attacks, almost all of the wing's aircraft were in a stand-down mode, while nearly all of its assigned aircraft were being converted to with the new Pacer-Crag cockpit and navigation upgrade.

Within minutes of the first aircraft crashes, the 171st Air Refueling Wing was airborne with its only flyable KC-135E. Its mission was to provide air refueling to the fuel-thirsty jet fighter aircraft that were providing Combat Air Patrol (CAP) over the skies of the eastern United States as part of Operation Noble Eagle. On the ground back in Pittsburgh, the maintainers and aircrews made more aircraft airworthy and then keeping them flying. Almost seamlessly, the 171st went into a wartime footing. Within 24 hours after the first attacks, the 171st was flying round-the-clock CAPs support sorties with eight fully mission capable KC-135s. Before the continuous CAP missions were ended in early 2002, more than 13,000 combat missions were flown over U.S. soil.

During the first decade of the 2000s, the 171st was engaged in combat operations in supporting Operation Enduring Freedom, Operation Noble Eagle, Operation Iraqi Freedom, deployed to Guam, participated in the Hurricane Katrina Relief Effort, supported numerous Raven assignments, supported our Air Expeditionary Force cycles and other missions.

In an effort to support the international response to the unrest in Libya and enforcement of United Nations Security Council Resolution 1973 of a no-fly zone over Libya, the 313th Air Expeditionary Wing, with the 171st as the lead unit, was stood up in March 2011 by a blend of active duty, guard and reserve airmen. A total of 1500 sorties, 11000 flying hours, and 70 million pounds of fuel transferred aircraft from more than ten countries was accomplished by this citizen-airmen volunteer militia force. Initially, the operation for the no-fly zone was called Operation Odyssey Dawn. As it transitioned to a full-fledged, NATO-led effort, it became Operation Unified Protector. This operation officially ended 31 October 2011.

=== Lineage ===
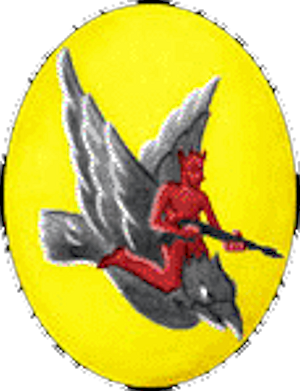
World War II 345th Fighter Squadron emblem

- Activated in England on 1 October 1942 by special authority granted to Eighth Air Force prior to constitution as 345th Fighter Squadron on 2 October 1942

Inactivated on 7 November 1945
Redesignated 146th Fighter Squadron and allotted to the National Guard on 24 May 1946
Extended federal recognition on 22 April 1949
Redesignated 146th Fighter-Interceptor Squadron on 1 October 1952
Redesignated 146th Fighter-Bomber Squadron on 1 November 1952
Redesignated 146th Fighter-Interceptor Squadron on 1 July 1955
Redesignated 146th Tactical Fighter Squadron on 1 July 1975
Redesignated 146th Air Refueling Squadron on 16 October 1991

=== Assignments ===
- 350th Fighter Group, 2 October 1942 – 7 November 1945
- 112th Fighter Group (later 112th Fighter-Bomber Group, 112th Fighter-Interceptor Group, 112th Tactical Fighter Group, 112th Air Refueling Group), 22 April 1949
- 171st Operations Group, 1 October 1993 – Present

=== Stations ===
- RAF Bushey Hall (AAF-341), England, 1 October 1942
- RAF Duxford (AAF-357), England, October 1942
- Oujda Airfield, French Morocco, 6 January 1943
- Oran Es Sénia Airport, Algeria, 14 February 1943
- Maison Blanche Airport, Algeria, May 1943
- Rerhaia Airfield, Algeria, c. 17 July 1943
- Sardinia, 5 November 1943
- Corsica, 6 February 1944
- Tarquinia Airfield, Italy, 8 September 1944
- Pisa Airfield, Italy, 2 December 1944 – 14 July 1945
- Seymour Johnson Field, North Carolina, 25 August – 7 November 1945
- Greater Pittsburgh Airport (later Greater Pittsburgh International Airport, Pittsburgh IAP Air Reserve Station), 22 April 1949

=== Aircraft ===
- P-39 Airacobra, 1942–1944
- P-400 Airacobra, 1942–1944
- P-38 Lightning, 1943
- P-47D Thunderbolt, 1944–1945
- F-47N Thunderbolt, 1949–1951
- F-51H Mustang, 1951–1954
- F-86A Sabre, 1954
- F-84F Thunderstreak, 1954–1957
- F-86D Sabre Interceptor, 1957–1960
- F-102A Delta Dagger, 1960–1975
- A-7D Corsair II, 1975–1991
- KC-135E Stratotanker, 1991–2004
- KC-135T Stratotanker, 2004 – present
