= 345th Fighter Squadron =

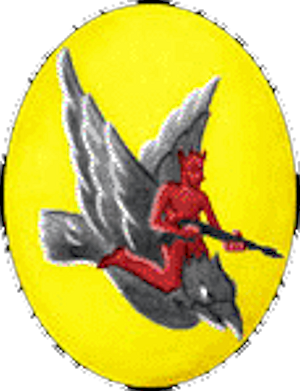
- Emblem of the 345th Fighter Squadron
- Active: 1942–1945
- Country: United States
- Branch: United States Air Force
- Type: Fighter Squadron

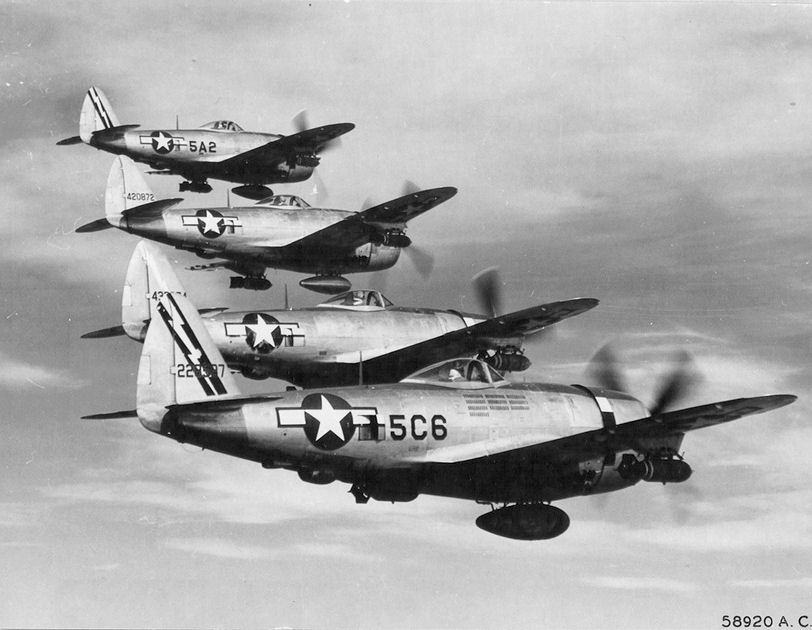
P-47 Thunderbolts of the 345th Fighter Squadron

The 345th Fighter Squadron is an inactive United States Air Force unit. Its last assignment was with the 350th Fighter Group stationed at Seymour Johnson Field, North Carolina. It was inactivated on 7 November 1945.

== History ==
Activated on 1 October 1942 at RAF Duxford, England by special authority of the USAAF by Eighth Air Force. Assigned to VIII Fighter Command, equipped with a mixture of United States personnel reassigned from the 31st and 52d Fighter Groups, and Americans transferred from the Royal Air Force who had volunteered to join the RAF prior to the United States entry into the European War, 11 December 1941.

Squadron was initially equipped with export/Lend-Lease version of P-39D Airacobra, designated Airacobra I by the RAF with additional aircraft that had been sold to France that been impounded by the British after the Fall of France. These aircraft were re-designated as P-400. Deployed to French Morocco and assigned to Twelfth Air Force where the unit engaged in combat during the North African campaign. Briefly equipped with P-38 Lightnings from June to Sept 1943 each Squadron was assigned two P-38s to intercept and destroy high flying Luftwaffe reconnaissance aircraft sent to photograph the allied invasion fleet gathering along the North African coast for the invasion of Sicily.

Re-equipped with P-47D Thunderbolts, January 1944 and engaged in combat during Italian Campaign. Also covered Allied landings on Elba in June 1944 and supported the invasion of southern France in August. Returned to Italy and fought in Po Valley, 1944–1945 until the end of the European War in May 1945.

Demobilized and inactivated, 7 November 1945. Unit designation allocated to Pennsylvania Air National Guard, re-designated as 146th Fighter Squadron, 24 May 1946.

=== Lineage ===
- Activated in England on 1 October 1942 by special authority granted to Eighth Air Force prior to constitution as 345th Fighter Squadron on 2 October 1942

Inactivated on 7 November 1945

- Redesignated 146th Fighter Squadron. Allotted to Pennsylvania Air National Guard on 24 May 1946.

=== Assignments ===
- 350th Fighter Group, 2 October 1942 – 7 November 1945

=== Stations ===
- RAF Bushey Hall (AAF-341), England, 1 October 1942
- RAF Duxford (AAF-357), England, October 1942
- Oujda Airfield, French Morocco, 6 January 1943
- Oran Es Sénia Airport, Oran, Algeria, 14 February 1943
- Maison Blanche Airport, Algiers, Algeria, May 1943
- Rerhaia Airfield, Algeria, c. 17 July 1943
- Sardinia, 5 November 1943
- Corsica, 6 February 1944
- Tarquinia Airfield, Italy, 8 September 1944
- Pisa Airfield, Italy, 2 December 1944 – 14 July 1945
- Seymour Johnson Field, North Carolina, 25 August – 7 November 1945

=== Aircraft ===
- P-39 Airacobra, 1942–1944
- P-400 Airacobra, 1942–1944
- P-38 Lightning, 1943
- P-47 Thunderbolt, 1944–1945
