= 148th Fighter Squadron =

Arizona Air National Guard unit

148th Fighter Squadron

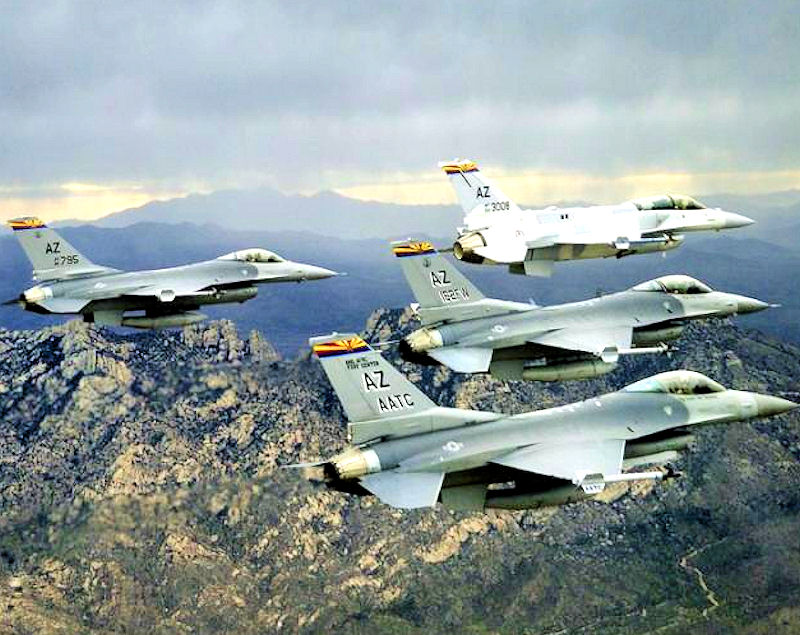
- 148th Fighter Squadron 4-aircraft F-16 formation
- Active: 1943-1945; 1947-1952; 1952-1967; 1985-present
- Country: United States
- Branch: Air National Guard
- Role: Foreign Military Sales pilot training
- Part of: 162d Fighter Wing
- Garrison/HQ: Tucson Air National Guard Base, Arizona.
- Nickname: "Kickin' Ass"
- Engagements: Mediterranean Theater of Operations
- Decorations: Distinguished Unit Citation

Insignia
- 148th Fighter Squadron emblem

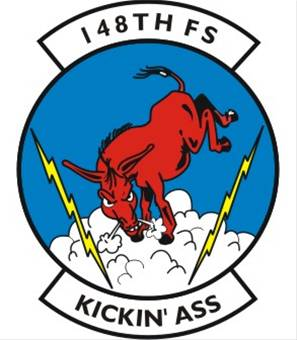
- 148th Fighter Squadron emblem

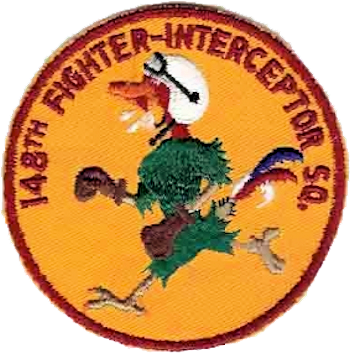
- 148th Fighter-Interceptor Squadron emblem

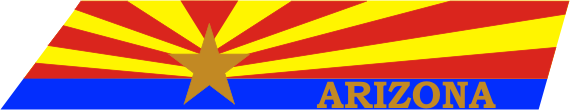
- Tail stripe
- Tail code: AZ

The 148th Fighter Squadron is a unit of the Arizona Air National Guard 162d Fighter Wing located at Tucson Air National Guard Base, Arizona. The 148th is equipped with the Block 20 F-16A/B Fighting Falcon. The squadron was first organized in England during World War II, moving to North Africa shortly after the invasion. It participated in combat in the Mediterranean Theater of Operations, where it earned a Distinguished Unit Citation. The squadron returned to the United States after V-E Day and was inactivated.

In 1946, the squadron was redesignated the 148th Fighter Squadron and allotted to the National Guard. It was organized the following year. The squadron was mobilized for the Korean War, serving as an air defense unit until 1952, when its personnel and equipment were transferred to a regular squadron and the unit returned to state control. In the mid-1950s, its home station proved too small to accommodate jet fighters, so its role changed to airlift and it became the 140th Air Transport Squadron. The squadron moved to Olmsted Air Force Base, where it was stationed until 1967, when it was replaced by the 193rd Tactical Electronic Warfare Squadron.

== Mission ==
The 148th Fighter Squadron specializes in the training of F-16 pilots for foreign air forces which have purchased the aircraft via the Foreign Military Sales program.

== History ==
=== World War II ===
The squadron was first activated as the 347th Fighter Squadron on 1 October 1942 at RAF Bushey Hall, England, moving to RAF Duxford for operations. It was initially part of to VIII Fighter Command, equipped with a mixture of United States personnel reassigned from the 31st and 52d Fighter Groups, and Americans transferred from the Royal Air Force (RAF) who had volunteered to join the RAF prior to the United States entry into the European War.

The squadron was initially equipped with export/Lend-Lease version of the Bell P-39 Airacobra, designated Airacobra I by the RAF, and P-400 by the AAF, with additional aircraft that had been sold to France that been impounded by the British after the Fall of France. The squadron deployed to French Morocco and became part of Twelfth Air Force where the unit engaged in combat during the North African Campaign. It was briefly equipped with Lockheed P-38 Lightnings from June to Sept 1943. Each squadron of the 350th Fighter Group was assigned two P-38s to intercept and destroy high flying Luftwaffe reconnaissance aircraft sent to photograph the allied invasion fleet gathering along the North African coast for the Operation Husky, the invasion of Sicily.

The squadron re-equipped with Republic P-47D Thunderbolts in January 1944 and engaged in combat during Italian campaign. It also covered Allied landings on Elba in June 1944 and supported the invasion of southern France in August. Returned to Italy and fought in Po Valley, 1944–1945 until the end of the European War in May 1945.

The squadron returned to the United States, where it was inactivated on 7 November 1945.

=== Pennsylvania Air National Guard ===
In May 1946, the squadron was redesignated the 148th Fighter Squadron, Single Engine and allotted to the Pennsylvania National Guard. The 148th was stationed at Reading Municipal Airport, Pennsylvania and equipped with North American F-51D Mustangs.

In February 1951 the squadron was called to active duty and redesignated the 148th Fighter-Interceptor Squadron. It was assigned to the 113th Fighter-Interceptor Wing and moved to Dover Air Force Base, Delaware as part of Air Defense Command (ADC) with an air defense mission for Southeastern Pennsylvania and Philadelphia. In September the squadron upgraded to jet propelled and air intercept radar equipped Lockheed F-94 Starfire aircraft.

However, ADC was experiencing difficulty under the existing wing base organizational structure in deploying its fighter squadrons to best advantage. Accordingly, in February 1952, it inactivated the 113th Wing and its elements and reassigned the 148th to the 4710th Defense Wing, which was organized on a regional basis. On 1 November 1952 the 148th was returned to the control of the State of Pennsylvania and its personnel, equipment and mission were transferred to the 46th Fighter-Interceptor Squadron, which was simultaneously activated at Dover.

The 148th returned to the Pennsylvania guard and its F-51s. With the end of the line for the Mustang in USAF service, the United States Air Force, in an effort to upgrade to an all jet fighter force, required Air National Guard air defense units to upgrade to jet-powered aircraft. The Reading Airport Commission and National Guard authorities found themselves in a conflict over the use of Reading Municipal Airport for tactical jet operations.

However, the National Guard Bureau's and the Commonwealth of Pennsylvania's desire to retain the unit brought a new mission and a numeric designation to the organization, the squadron was redesignated the 140th Air Transport Squadron on 1 July 1956 using propeller-driven Curtiss C-46 Commando aircraft. In 1961, the squadron moved to Olmsted Air Force Base, assuming an aeromedical evacuation mission and converted to Lockheed C-121 Constellations. In the Spring of 1964, the 140th Aeromedical Transport Squadron's mission and designation changed to 140th Air Transport Squadron and the Air National Guard operation at Olmsted expanded to a group, with the formation of the 168th Air Transport Group. Other elements assigned into the group were the 168th Material Squadron (later replaced by the 168th Consolidated Aircraft Maintenance Squadron and 168th Supply Squadron), 168th Support Squadron, and the 168th USAF Dispensary. These units were located at Olmsted Air Force Base and operated the Lockheed C-121 Constellation. In 1966 the group became the 168th Military Airlift Group.

Threatened by the closure of Olmsted (now Harrisburg Air National Guard Base) and by the downsizing of all conventionally powered transport aircraft, the National Guard Bureau volunteered the unit for a psychological warfare capability named "Coronet Solo" in 1967. The 168th Military airlift Group and its components were inactivated and withdrawn from the Air National Guard. Its resources were transferred to the new 193rd Tactical Electronic Warfare Group, becoming Tactical Air Command's first tactical electronic warfare unit that was not an active duty unit. Tactical Air Command replaced Military Airlift Command as its mobilization gaining command, although the unit continued to operate the C-121s of the old 168th Group until November 1977, when its last C-121C was flown to the Military Aircraft Storage and Disposition Center at Davis-Monthan Air Force Base, Arizona.

=== Arizona Air National Guard ===
The unit was allotted to the Arizona Air National Guard on 15 October 1985 and redesignated as the 148th Tactical Fighter Training Squadron.

Assigned to the 162d Tactical Fighter Training Group at Tucson International Airport, Arizona. The 148th TFTS was tasked with pilot training for the foreign air forces as part of the Foreign Military Sales program, although the squadron has also been tasked with training F-16 crew for the USAF and the Air National Guard both advanced and beginner training. Through the years numerous countries have detached personnel to receive advanced training by the squadron.

The first to make use of these was the Royal Netherlands Air Force (RNLAF). Training used a mix of USAF F-16 as well as some Dutch F-16s. Eventually a total of eight RNLAF F-16s were on hand. These Dutch aircraft were hard to tell apart from the USAF as they had the same markings and were the same blocks. In 1991, the squadron was officially tasked with a NATO F-16 training mission which was not much of a departure from the norm. The squadron was re-designated as the 148th Fighter Squadron on 15 March 1992 and the training role continued. By May 1995 all the RNLAF F-16s had departed Tucson for their native country.

In 2003 another contract was signed that included detaching foreign F-16s. These new F-16s would be the E/F models of the United Arab Emirates Air Force. It wasn't until 2 September 2004 that UAE students were able to train with the F-16E/F when it arrived at Tucson. Most pilots came from Mirage 2000 or the Hawk. The first class of graduates was made complete in April 2005. During the course of 2010 these aircraft returned to the UAE to form a new fighter squadron. The relationship ended on 20 October 2010 with over 100 UAE F-16 pilots trained. The last aircraft departed for UAE during December.

2010 saw a new contract with the RNLAF. The Dutch already had a detachment with the 162d Fighter Squadron of the Ohio Air National Guard. This unit was to lose its F-16 task and so the Dutch needed to search for another training site. The USAF then proposed the 148th FS. So an influx of Dutch F-16AM/BM airframes began December 2010. The first class of about ten pilots graduated in late April 2011.

The Dutch contingent left during August 2022 heading to Brussels South Charleroi Airport, a SABCA site at Charleroi, Belgium for storage.

== Lineage ==
- Activated on 1 October 1942 by special authority granted to Eighth Air Force prior to constitution as the 347th Fighter Squadron on 2 October 1942

Inactivated on 7 November 1945

- Redesignated 148th Fighter Squadron, Single Engine and allotted to the National Guard on 24 May 1946
- Organized on 3 January 1947

Extended federal recognition on 27 February 1947
Federalized and placed on active duty on 10 February 1951
Redesignated 148th Fighter-Interceptor Squadron on 10 February 1951
Released from active Federal Service on 1 November 1952
Redesignated 148th Fighter-Bomber Squadron on 1 November 1952
Redesignated 148th Fighter-Interceptor Squadron on 1 July 1955
Redesignated 140th Air Transport Squadron, Heavy on 1 July 1956
Redesignated 140th Aeromedical Transport Squadron and activated 1 July 1956
Redesignated 140th Air Transport Squadron on 16 February 1964
Redesignated 140th Military Airlift Squadron on 8 January 1966
Inactivated and withdrawn from the Air National Guard on 1 June 1967

- Redesignated 148th Tactical Fighter Training Squadron and allotted to Arizona Air National Guard, 1985

Extended federal recognition and activated on 15 October 1985
Redesignated: 148th Fighter Squadron on 15 March 1992

=== Assignments ===
- 350th Fighter Group, 2 October 1942 – 7 November 1945
- 53d Fighter Wing, 3 January 1947
- 112th Fighter Group, 23 April 1949
- First Air Force, 10 February 1951
- 113th Fighter-Interceptor Wing, c. 14 February 1951
- 4710th Defense Wing, 6 February 1952 – 1 November 1952
- 112th Fighter-Bomber Group (later 112th Fighter-Interceptor Group), 1 November 1952
- 112th Fighter-Interceptor Wing (later 112th Air Defense Wing), 1 May 1956
- 106th Aeromedical Transport Group, 14 September 1958
- 168th Air Transport Group, c. 15 October 1964 – 1 June 1967
- 162d Tactical Fighter Training Group (later 162d Fighter Group), 15 October 1985
- 162d Operations Group, 11 October 1995 – Present

=== Stations ===
- RAF Bushey Hall (AAF-341), England, 1 October 1942
- RAF Duxford (AAF-357), England, October 1942
- Oujda Airfield, French Morocco, 6 January 1943
- Oran Es Sénia Airport, Algeria, 14 February 1943
- Maison Blanche Airport, Algeria, May 1943
- Rerhaia Airfield, Algeria, c. 17 July 1943
- Sardinia, 5 November 1943
- Corsica, 6 February 1944
- Tarquinia Airfield, Italy, 8 September 1944
- Pisa Airfield, Italy, 2 December 1944 – 14 July 1945
- Seymour Johnson Field, North Carolina, 25 August – 7 November 1945
- Spaatz Field (Reading Municipal Airport), Pennsylvania, 3 January 1947
- Dover Air Force Base, Delaware, c. 14 February 1951 – 1 November 1952
- Reading Municipal Airport, Pennsylvania, 1 November 1952
- Olmsted Air Force Base, Pennsylvania, c. 1 February 1961 – 30 June 1956
- Tucson International Airport, Arizona (ANG portion designated: Tucson Air National Guard Base 1991), 10 October 1985 – present

=== Aircraft ===
- Bell P-39 Airacobra, 1942–1944
- Bell P-400 Airacobra, 1942–1944
- Lockheed P-38 Lightning, 1943
- Republic P-47 Thunderbolt, 1944–1945
- North American F-51D Mustang, 1947-1951; 1953-1956
- Republic F-84C Thunderjet, 1951
- Lockheed F-94C Starfire, 1951–1952
- Curtiss C-46 Commando, 1956–1958
- Fairchild C-119 Flying Boxcar, 1958–1961
- Lockheed C-121 Constellation, 1961–1967
- Republic F-84C Thunderjet, 1951
- Lockheed F-94 Starfire, 1951-1952
- General Dynamics F-16C Fighting Falcon, 1985 – present
- General Dynamics F-16D Fighting Falcon, 1985 – present

== See also ==
List of United States Air Force Aerospace Defense Command Interceptor Squadrons
