= Millennium Aviation =

IATA	ICAO	Call sign
-	-	-
- Operating bases: Reading Regional Airport
- Fleet size: 1 or 2 for a maximum of 38 passengers.
- Destinations: unknown.
- Headquarters: Reading, Pennsylvania, United States

Millennium Aviation is a passenger Charter airline, operating business jets, based in Reading, Pennsylvania. It is also a fixed-base operator (FBO) at the Reading Regional Airport.

== Works cited and links ==
- The Millennium Aviation's official website
- Air Charter Guide
