= Reading Regional Airport =

Airport in Pennsylvania

Reading Regional Airport Carl A. Spaatz Field Reading Army Air Field

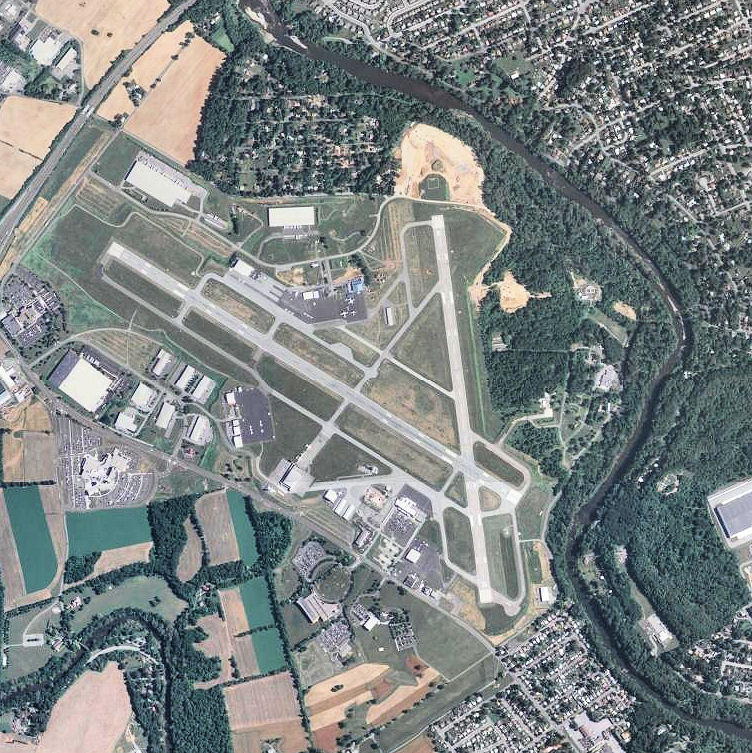
- 2006 aerial photo of Reading Regional Airport
- IATA: RDG; ICAO: KRDG; FAA LID: RDG

Summary
- Airport type: Public
- Owner: Reading Regional Airport Authority
- Serves: Reading, Pennsylvania, U.S.
- Location: Bern Township, Pennsylvania, U.S.
- Elevation AMSL: 344 ft / 105 m
- Coordinates: 40°22′43″N 075°57′55″W
- Website: www.ReadingAirport.org

Map
- Location of Reading Regional Airport RDG (the United States)

Runways
Direction	Length		Surface
Direction	ft	m	Surface
13/31	6,350	1,935	Asphalt
18/36	5,151	1,570	Asphalt

Statistics (2022)
- Aircraft operations: 38.139
- Based aircraft: 115
- Passenger boardings (2006): 2,268
- Source: FAA and airport web site

Reading Regional Airport (IATA: RDG, ICAO: KRDG, FAA LID: RDG), also known as Carl A. Spaatz Field, is a public airport three miles (5 km) northwest of Reading, in Bern Township, Berks County, Pennsylvania. It is owned by the Reading Regional Airport Authority.

Federal Aviation Administration records indicate the airport had 2,268 passenger boardings in calendar year 2006, 2,445 in 2005, and 9,288 in 2004. The airport had scheduled flights on US Airways Express carrier Air Midwest, which ended on September 3, 2004. The airport is now served by a charter airline.

== History ==
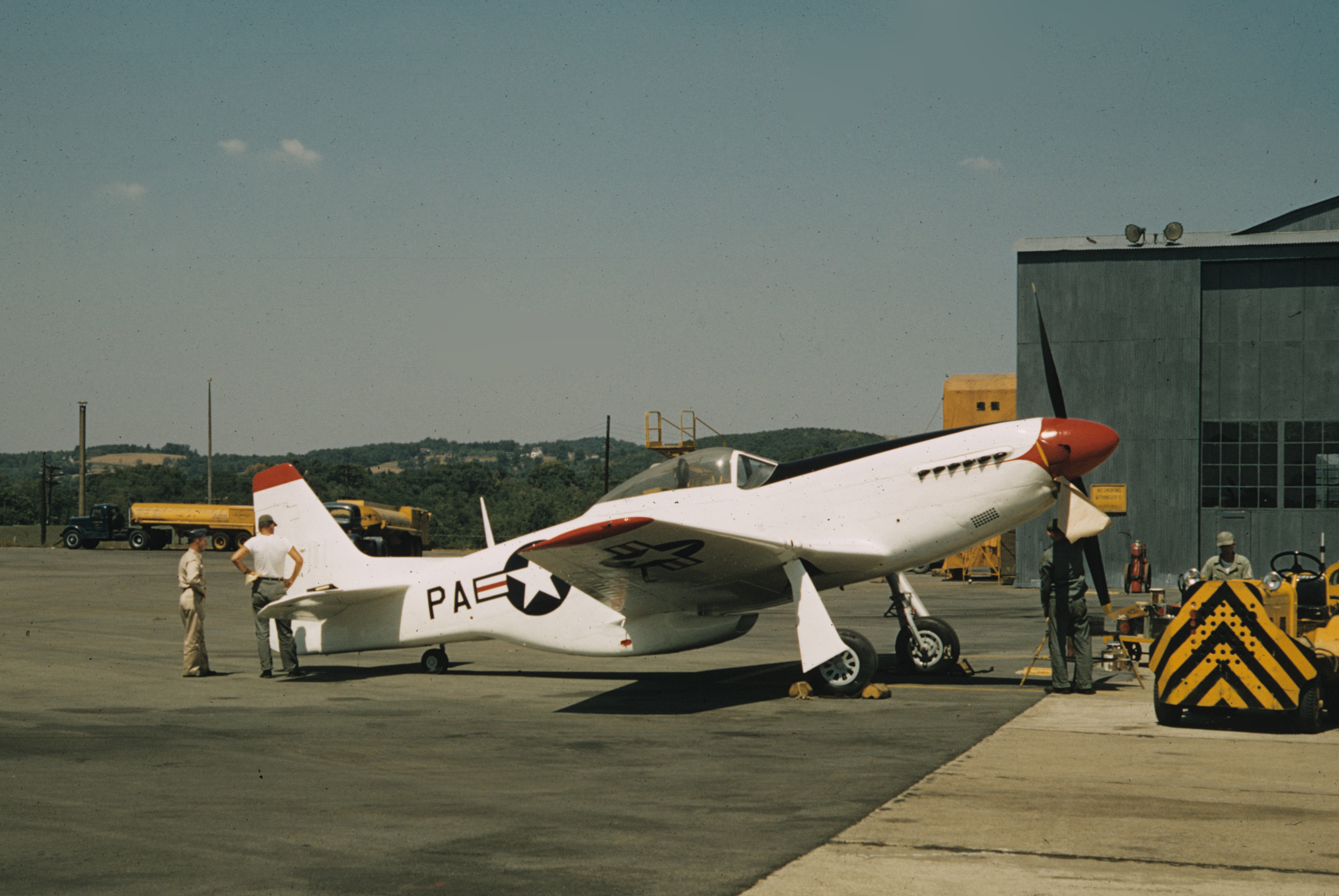
F-51D of the 148th Fighter Squadron, Pennsylvania ANG in 1957

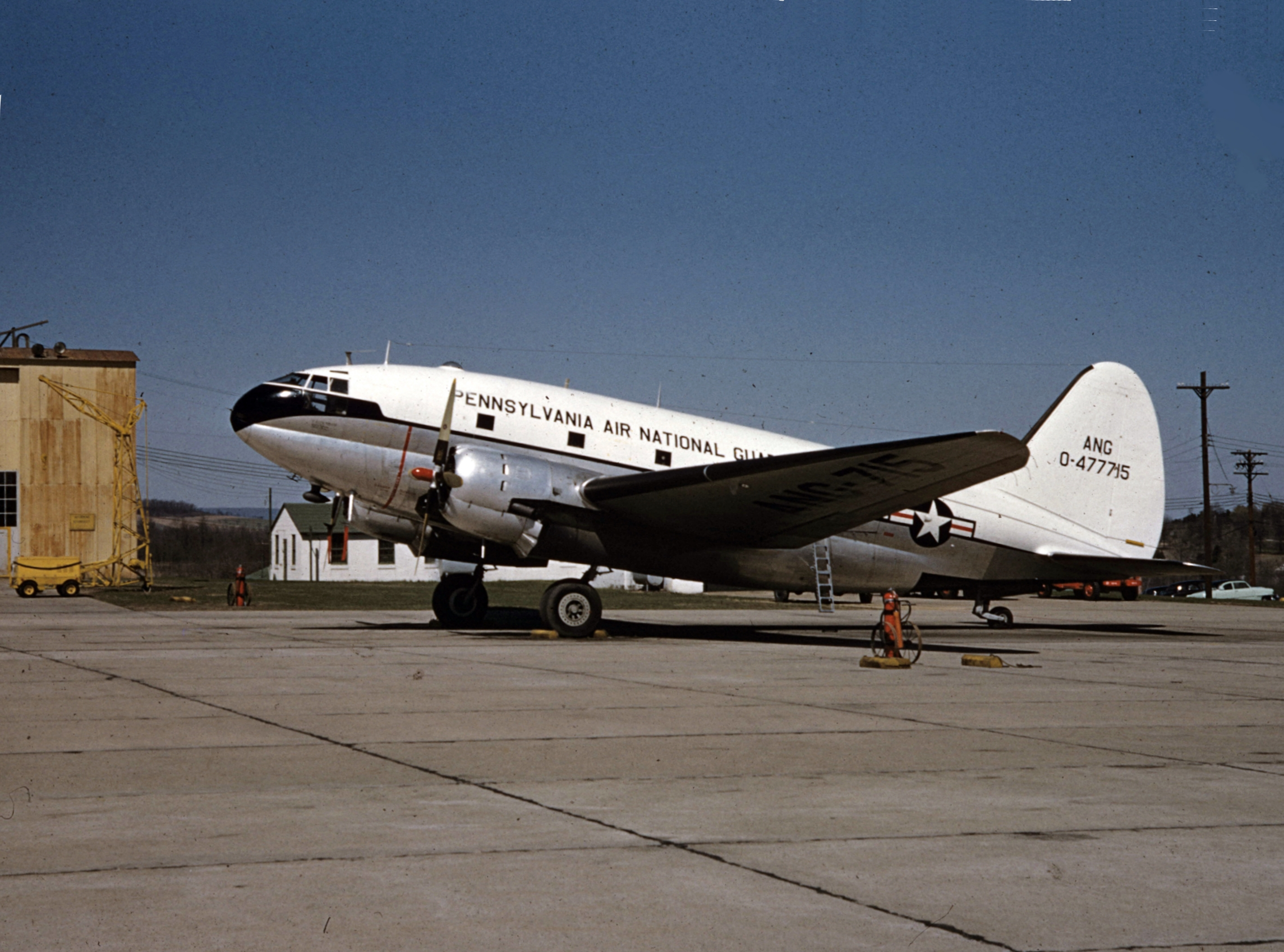
Curtiss C-46D-10-CU 44-77715 at Spaatz Field, 140th Aeromedical Transport Squadron, Pennsylvania ANG in 1957

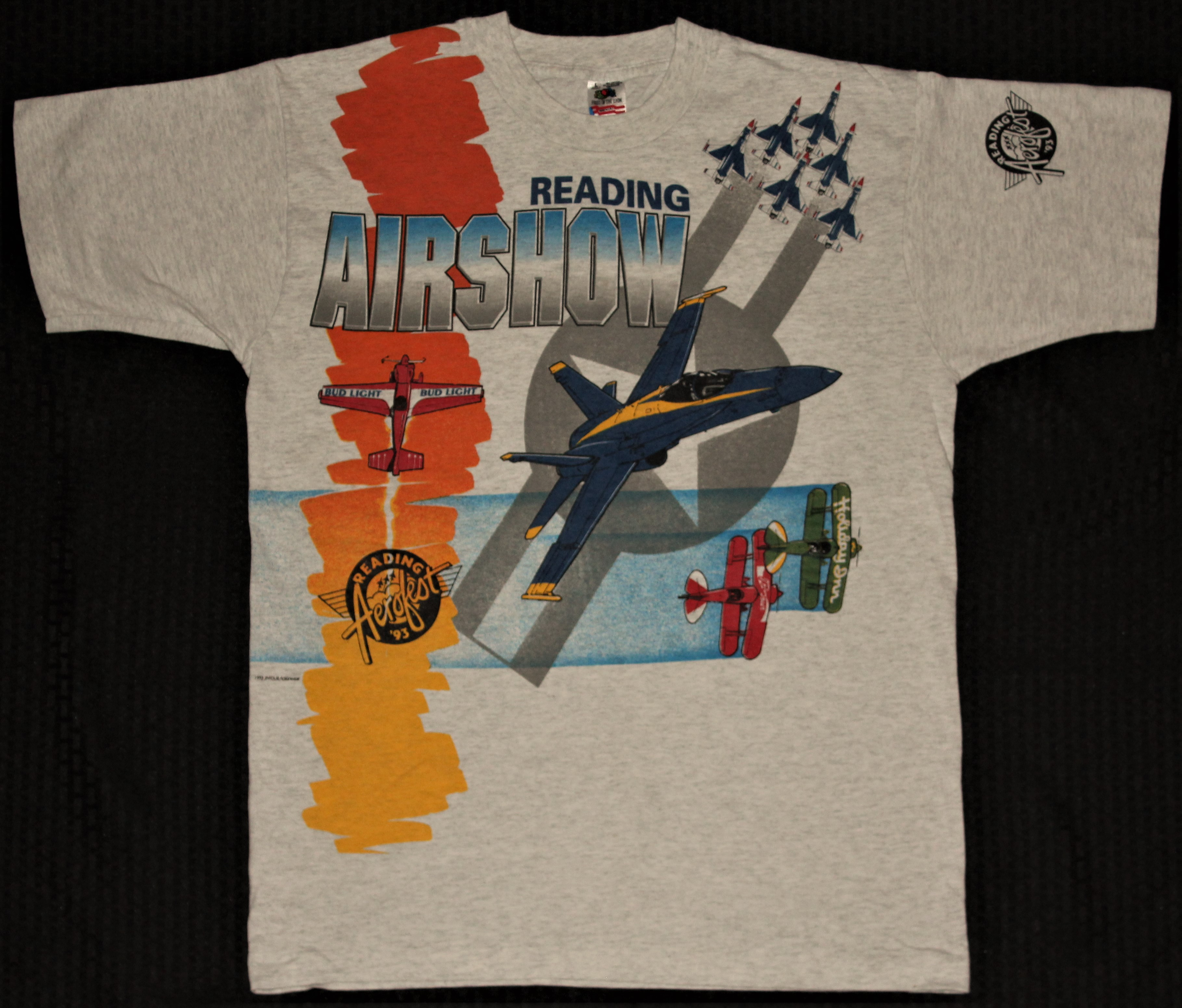
1993 Reading Airshow T-shirt featuring U.S Navy Blue Angels and the U.S. Air Force Thunderbird's

Opened as a civil airport in April 1938, Reading Airport was used by the United States Army Air Forces First Air Force as a training airfield during World War II.

Reading Army Air Field opened on June 1, 1943, with the 309th Base Headquarters and Air Base Squadron as its host unit. The mission was to train tactical reconnaissance units. The 26th Tactical Reconnaissance Group was activated on the airfield the same date, with the 37th, 39th, 40th, and 91st Photo Reconnaissance Squadrons.

Aircraft used for training were the Curtiss O-52 Owl; Douglas O-53 Havoc; Douglas O-46, and the Stinson O-49 Vigilant. The 72d Liaison Squadron, flying the Aeronca O-58 Grasshopper arrived on June 7, and remained assigned to the station until July 29, 1943 when it was assigned to Camp Mackall in North Carolina.

On November 11, 1943, the 26th was reassigned to Camp Campbell, Kentucky to train with the 101st Airborne Division before deploying to England, and engaging in combat operations as part of Ninth Air Force. It was replaced by the 11th Photographic Group on 1 December 1943. The 11th Photo Group used Reading as its worldwide headquarters, as its reconnaissance and photo squadrons were deployed to various parts of the world.

On January 1, 1944, Reading AAF was reassigned to Air Technical Service Command and became a sub-base of the Middletown Air Depot near Harrisburg, Pennsylvania. The mission of the station became to repair and overhaul aircraft and return them to active service. The 11th Photo Group moved out to MacDill Field, Florida.

On June 1, 1944, the 309th Air Base Squadron was disbanded and replaced by the 4109th Army Air Forces Base Unit. Activity at Reading was phased down in summer 1945, and with the war ending it was inactivated as an active military airfield on 26 February 1946 and designated as an Air Force Reserve base. On that date the field was turned over to Air Defense Command, Eleventh Air Force as a reserve airfield, and the 438th AAF Base Unit (Reserve Training) (later the 2237th Air Force Reserve Training Center) was organized to coordinate reserve training. On 1 January 1948 jurisdiction was transferred to the ADC First Air Force.

During the late 1940s, a series of reserve bombardment groups were assigned to the airport:

- On 24 May 1946 the 148th Fighter Squadron, Pennsylvania Air National Guard was assigned to the Airport. It was formerly the Twelfth Air Force 347th Fighter Squadron which was inactivated on 7 November 1945 prior to being re designated and turned over to the Air National Guard. The squadron was activated at the airport on 22 April 1947 with P (later F-47) Thunderbolts under the 112th Fighter Group at Pittsburgh Airport. On 10 February 1951 the squadron was federalized due to the Korean War and brought to active duty at Dover AFB, Delaware. It was released from active duty on 1 November 1952 and was re-equipped with the P-51 Mustang for interceptor duty. In 1956, as propeller driven F-51 Mustang fighters faded into history, the unit was re-designated the 140th Aeromedical Transport Squadron, flying the C-46 Commando and later the C-119 Flying Boxcar. In 1964, the unit relocated to its current location at Olmsted Air National Guard Base (present day Harrisburg International Airport)
- 322d Bombardment Group (Light), 9 August 1947 – 27 June 1949, Flew the A-26 Invader

59th, 451st and 452d Bombardment Squadrons. Also had the 55th Troop Carrier Group assigned, but never equipped.

- 319th Bombardment Group (Light), 27 June-2 September 1949, Flew the A-26 Invader

49th and 51st Bombardment Squadrons

- 512th Troop Carrier Group (Combat Cargo), 2 September 1949 – 1 May 1950, Flew the C-46 Commando

1st, 2d, 3d and 4th Combat Cargo Squadrons

Due to budgetary cutbacks the Reserve Training Center at Reading was inactivated on 1 May 1950 and reassigned to New Castle County Airport, Delaware. The Air Force closed its facilities at Reading airport and it returned to civil control.

In the 1950s, Reading Air Services sponsored the National Maintenance & Operations Meeting, better known as the Reading Airshow, and later Reading Aerofest. The annual airshow was one of the largest in the United States through the sixties and seventies peaking at 100,000 in attendance in 1976. The show expanded to a week long trade and airshow, then declined and ended in 1980 as infrastructure was overwhelmed and prices escalated. It was revived again in 1985 as a smaller airshow, the Reading Aerofest, ending in 1998.

Since the 1950s, the airport has been home to the Reading Composite Squadron (Pennsylvania Wing designation Squadron 811) of the U.S. Civil Air Patrol.

In the 1950s, TWA, Capital and Colonial (then Eastern) stopped at Reading. Allegheny replaced Capital in 1960, TWA left in late 1962, Eastern left in 1969, and Reading dropped out of the OAG in 2004.

On December 5, 1984, Reading Airport was dedicated as Carl Andrew Spaatz Field. Carl Spaatz was a nearby Boyertown, Pennsylvania native and a World War II General. General Spaatz was the first Chief of Staff of the United States Air Force.

== Facilities ==
The airport covers 888 acres (359 ha) and has two asphalt runways: 13/31 is 6,350 x 150 ft (1,935 x 46 m) and 18/36 is 5,151 x 150 ft (1,570 x 46 m).

As of 2022, the airport had 38,139 aircraft operations, average 104 per day: 85% general aviation, 12% air taxi, 3% military, and <1% scheduled commercial. 115 aircraft were based at the airport: 77 single-engine, 19 multi-engine, 14 jet, 4 helicopter, and 1 glider.

=== Mid-Atlantic Air Museum ===
The Mid-Atlantic Air Museum is located at Reading Airport. It collects and actively restores historic war planes and classic airliners as well as rare civilian and military aircraft, with large number of historic aircraft on display to the public. It has also embarked on a project to restore its P-61B-1-NO Black Widow, recovered from New Guinea in 1989, to flying condition.

== Airlines and destinations ==
=== Cargo ===
Airlines	Destinations
Quest Diagnostics	Charter: Bowling Green, Elmira, Huntington, Manassas, Pittsburgh, Pottstown, Raleigh/Durham, Teterboro

== Accidents ==
- On July 11, 1946, TWA Flight 513, a Lockheed L-049 Constellation on a training flight crashed 2.8 miles NW of RDG due to a fire in the forward baggage hold. Five out of the 6 occupants were killed.
- On April 9, 1977, an Altair Airlines Aérospatiale N 262 collided with a Cessna 195 at 4,500 feet AGL after being cleared for a left downwind approach to runway 31 and crashed 6.8 miles S of RDG. All 3 crew in the N262 were killed as well as the pilot of the Cessna.

== See also ==
- List of airports in Pennsylvania
- Pennsylvania World War II Army Airfields
