= Pennsylvania World War II Army Airfields =

United States World War II army airfields

Pennsylvania World War II Army Airfields
- Part of World War II

Site information
- Type: Army Airfields

Site history
- Built: 1940-1944
- In use: 1940-present

During World War II, the United States Army Air Forces (USAAF) established numerous airfields in Pennsylvania for training pilots and aircrews of USAAF fighters and bombers.

Most of these airfields were under the command of First Air Force or the Army Air Forces Training Command (AAFTC) (A predecessor of the current-day United States Air Force Air Education and Training Command). However the other USAAF support commands (Air Technical Service Command (ATSC); Air Transport Command (ATC) or Troop Carrier Command) commanded a significant number of airfields in a support roles.

It is still possible to find remnants of these wartime airfields. Many were converted into municipal airports, some were returned to agriculture and several were retained as United States Air Force installations and were front-line bases during the Cold War. Hundreds of the temporary buildings that were used survive today, and are being used for other purposes.

== Major airfields ==
Air Technical Service Command

- Connellsville MAP, Connellsville

Now: Joseph A. Hardy Connellsville Airport (ICAO: KVVS, FAA LID: VVS)

- Olmsted Field AAF, Middletown

487th/496th Army Air Force Base Unit
Was: Olmsted Air Force Base (1947-1968)
Now: Harrisburg International Airport (IATA: MDT, ICAO: KMDT, FAA LID: MDT)

First Air Force

- Philadelphia Northeast Airport, Philadelphia, Pennsylvania

431st Army Air Force Base Unit (Reduced)
Now: Northeast Philadelphia Airport (IATA: PNE, ICAO: KPNE, FAA LID: PNE)

- Reading AAF, Reading

390th Army Air Force Base Unit
Now: Reading Regional Airport (IATA: RDG, ICAO: KRDG, FAA LID: RDG)

Air Transport Command

- Pittsburgh Army Air Base, Pittsburgh

Now: Pittsburgh IAP Air Reserve Station (IATA: PIT, ICAO: KPIT, FAA LID: PIT)

Army Air Forces Training Command

- Waynesboro MAP, Waynesboro

Contract Primary Pilot Training
Closed, 1950 Now: non-aviation industrial site.

Other

- Other known airfields used by the USAAF were at Ebensburg, Milton, Beaver Falls and Williamsport. It has yet to be discovered what use the AAF made of those facilities.
