= 171st Air Refueling Wing =

Pennsylvania Air National Guard unit

171st Air Refueling Wing

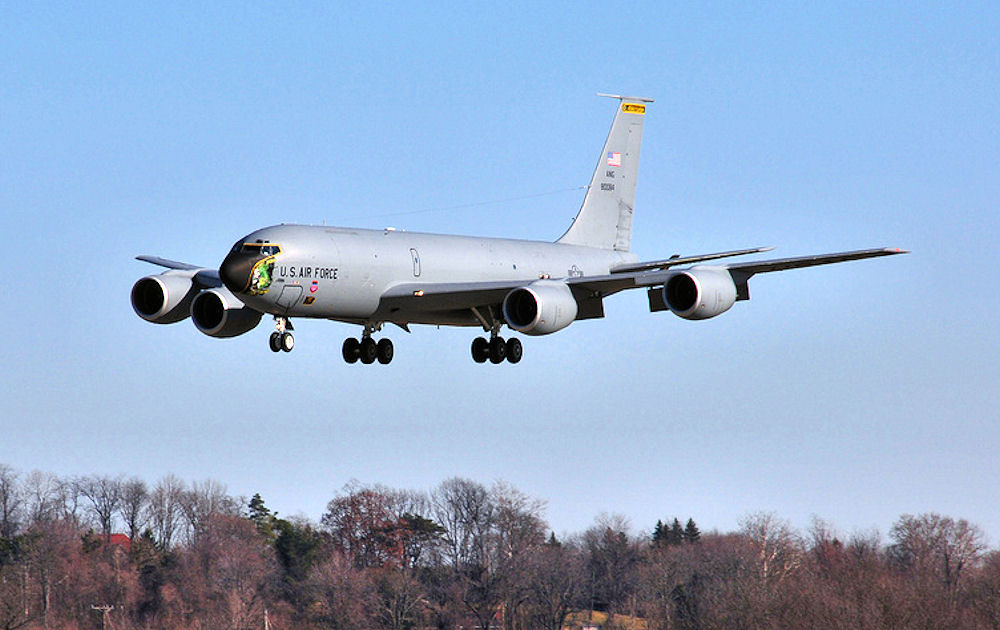
- 171st Air Refueling Wing Boeing KC-135T Stratotanker landing at Pittsburgh AGB
- Active: 1 February 1961 – present
- Country: United States
- Allegiance: Pennsylvania
- Branch: Air National Guard
- Type: Wing
- Role: Aerial refueling
- Part of: Pennsylvania Air National Guard
- Garrison/HQ: Pittsburgh IAP, Pennsylvania
- Motto: "Pride Vigilance Honor"
- Website: https://www.171arw.ang.af.mil

Commanders
- Commander: Col. Ryan D. Strong
- Vice Commander: Col. Samuel S. Wilson
- Command Chief: CCM Ryan J. Conley

Insignia
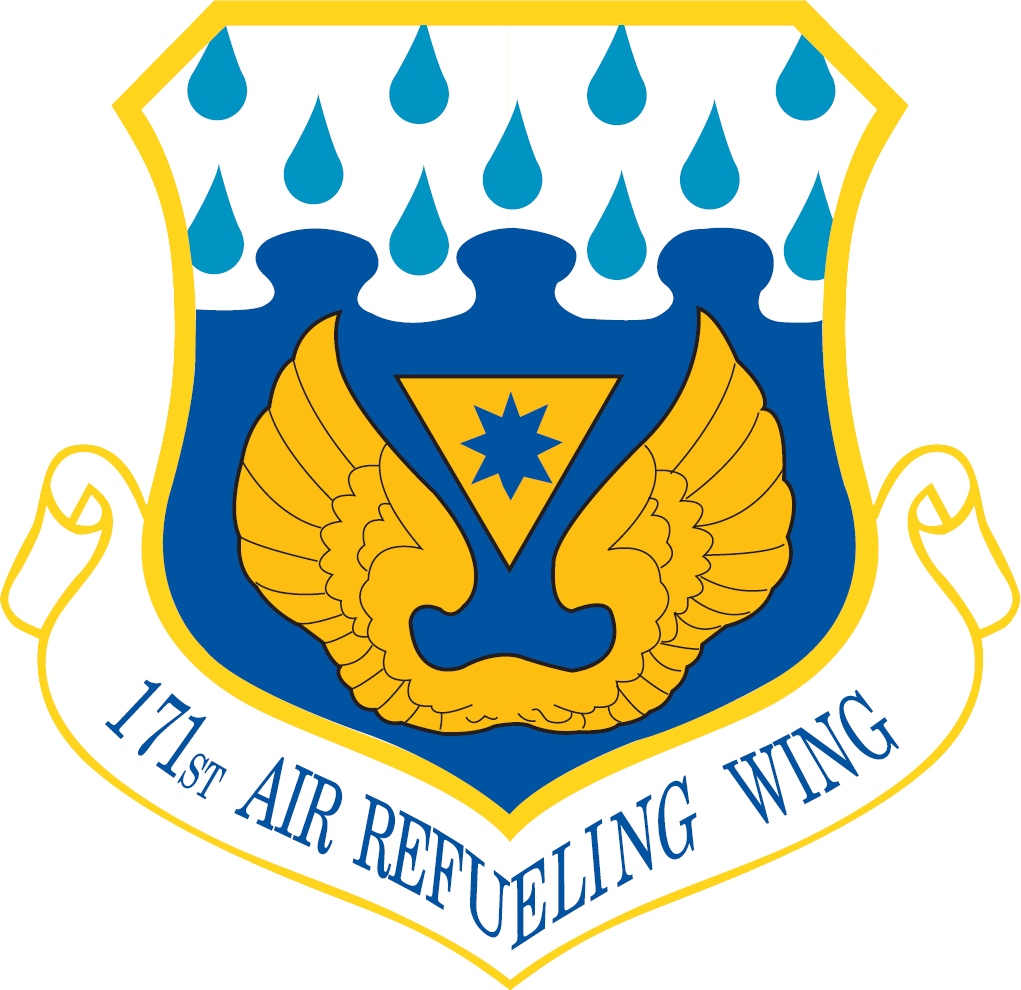
- 171st Air Refueling Wing emblem
- Tail stripe: Black tail stripe, "Pennsylvania" in yellow letters

The 171st Air Refueling Wing is a unit of the Pennsylvania Air National Guard, located at Pittsburgh International Airport in Coraopolis, Pennsylvania. If activated to federal service, the Wing is gained by the United States Air Force Air Mobility Command.

== Mission ==
The 171st Air Refueling Wing is an air refueling organization which provides in-flight refueling of fighters, bombers and other aircraft using the KC-135T Stratotanker. The 171 ARW presently has 16 aircraft assigned.

== Units ==
The 171st Air Refueling Wing consists of the following units:

- 171st Operations Group

146th Air Refueling Squadron (KC-135T Stratotanker)
147th Air Refueling Squadron (KC-135T Stratotanker)
258th Air Traffic Control Squadron

Geographically separated unit of the 171st ARW, located at the John P. Murtha Cambria County Airport in Johnstown Pennsylvania.

- 171st Maintenance Group
- 171st Mission Support Group
- 171st Medical Group

== History ==
=== Aeromedical Airlift ===
On 1 February 1961, the Pennsylvania Air National Guard 147th Fighter-Interceptor Squadron was authorized to expand to a group level, and the 171st Air Transport Group was established by the National Guard Bureau. The 147th being transferred from the 112th Fighter-Interceptor Group and re-designated as the 147th Aeromedical Transport Squadron. The 147th ATS became the 171st ATG's flying squadron. The 147th ATS was converted to twin engine C-119J Flying Boxcar aircraft and began training for its new mission. Other squadrons assigned into the group were the 171st Headquarters, 171st Material Squadron (Maintenance), 171st Combat Support Squadron, and the 171st USAF Dispensary.

After two years with the C-119J, the 147th converted to the C-121G Super Constellation. With the Super Constellation the primary mission of the 147th was to perform military airlift, with a secondary mission of aeromedical evacuation.

In 1968, the unit was re-designated as the 171st Aeromedical Airlift Group, the first of its kind in the Air National Guard (ANG). Later that year, the 171st was called to active duty to augment the airlift capability of the 375th Aeromedical Airlift Wing, Scott AFB, Illinois. Equipped with C-131 Samaritan aircraft its mission was to move patients from rough combat airfield casualty staging bases and military installations in South Vietnam to destination treatment hospitals. The Group flew 35% of these missions, flying 510 sorties and airlifting 11,947 patients. The unit was finally released from active duty in December 1968 and returned to Pennsylvania Commonwealth control.

=== Air refueling ===
Conforming to the new policy of the Department of Defense, the Air National Guard began to play an even greater role in fulfilling total U.S. force requirements. An extensive reorganization of the National Guard system was accomplished. As a result of these actions, the 171st Aeromedical Airlift Group was re-designated as the 171st Air Refueling Wing (ARW) in October 1972, transitioning from the C-121G to the KC-97L Stratotanker.

On 1 July 1976, the Wing received notice of reassignment to the Strategic Air Command (SAC). A year later, the Wing transitioned to the KC-135A Stratotanker, a four-engine jet aircraft. This was a significant upgrade, increasing the Wing's air refueling capacity and expanding its global mission capability.

In 1982, the ANG increased its mission capability through an interim program by retrofitting commercial Boeing 707 engines to their tankers re-designating the aircraft to the KC-135E.

Members of the 171 ARW volunteered for duty in Saudi Arabia in order to participate in air refueling missions for Operation Desert Shield. These operations were upgraded to a full federal activation in December 1990 through May 1991. During this period over 300 members of the unit were deployed throughout the world in numerous functions supporting both Desert Shield and combat operations during Operation Desert Storm. During this period the 171st ARW refueled nearly 3,000 allied aircraft while stationed near the Iraqi border in support of air combat missions against Iraqi forces. Maintaining a remarkable 100% mission effectiveness rate, the 171st flew 556 combat missions and offloaded 4.6 million gallons of fuel during the 1991 Gulf War.

=== Post Cold War era ===
Strategic Air Command was inactivated in June 1992 and the 112th ARG became a part of the Air Combat Command (ACC). On 1 October 1993, with both the 112th Air Refueling Group and the 171st Air Refueling Wing at Pittsburgh, the two tanker units were consolidated with the 146th Air Refueling Squadron being reassigned to the 171st Operations Group and once again reuniting with the 147th under the same group. The 112th Air Refueling Group was inactivated. With the consolidation, The 171st ARW consisted of 16 aircraft assigned to two squadrons, making it one of only three Super Tanker Wings within the Air National Guard.

In May 1999, the 171st activated over 500 members and fourteen aircraft to Budapest, Hungary and Frankfurt, Germany, in support of Operation Allied Force deterring ethnic aggression in Yugoslavia. The 147th became part of the 171st Expeditionary Operations Group that flew 411 sorties and refueled 2,157 receivers. All members returned home by the beginning of July 1999.

In November 2000, the 171st deployed 228 personnel to Istres AB, France in support of Operation Joint Forge, a NATO-led stabilization mission in Bosnia-Herzegovina. During this deployment, the crews flew 51 sorties in seven of our KC-135s, and offloaded 1.4 million pounds of fuel.

=== Global War on Terrorism ===
The 171st found itself among the first units called to duty almost immediately after the 9/11 terrorist attacks in New York City, Washington, D.C., and in its own backyard in southwestern Pennsylvania on 11 September 2001 with the hijacking and crash of United Airlines Flight 93. At the time, almost all of the Wing's aircraft were in a stand-down mode, while nearly all of its assigned aircraft were being converted to with the new Pacer-Crag cockpit and navigation upgrade.

Within minutes of the first aircraft crashes, the 171st Air Refueling Wing was airborne with its only flyable KC-135E. Its mission was to provide aerial refueling to the fuel-thirsty jet fighter aircraft that were providing Combat Air Patrols (CAPs) over the skies of the eastern United States as part of Operation Noble Eagle (ONE). On the ground back in Pittsburgh, the maintainers and aircrews made more aircraft airworthy and then keeping them flying. Almost seamlessly, the 171st went into a wartime footing. Within 24 hours after the first attacks, the 171st was flying round-the-clock CAPs support sorties with eight Fully Mission Capable KC-135s. Before the continuous CAP missions were ended in early 2002, more than 13,000 combat missions were flown over U.S. soil.

During the first decade of the 2000s, the 171st was engaged in combat operations in supporting Operation Enduring Freedom, Operation Noble Eagle, Operation Iraqi Freedom, deployed to Guam, participated in the Hurricane Katrina Relief Effort, supported numerous Raven assignments, supported our AEF cycles and other missions.

In an effort to support the international response to the unrest in Libya and enforcement of United Nations Security Council Resolution 1973 of a no-fly zone over Libya, the 313th Air Expeditionary Wing, with the 171st as the lead unit, was stood up in March 2011 by a blend of active duty, guard and reserve airmen. A total of 1500 sorties, 11000 flying hours, and 70 million pounds of fuel transferred aircraft from more than ten countries was accomplished by this citizen-airmen volunteer militia force. Initially, the operation for the no-fly zone was called Operation Odyssey Dawn. As it transitioned to a full-fledged, NATO-led effort, it became Operation Unified Protector. OUP officially ended 31 Oct. 2011.

The wing had a consistent, non-stop presence of aircraft maintenance personnel deployed to the middle east in order to support the ongoing operations there. In 2018, personnel from the 171st Maintenance group deployed to Kandahar Air base, Afghanistan. This was a significant shift in the operational stance of the wing, as this was the first time tankers had been stationed inside the combat zone since the Vietnam War.

== Lineage ==
- Designated 171st Air Transport Group, and allotted to Pennsylvania ANG, 1961

Extended federal recognition and activated on 1 February 1961
Redesignated 171st Military Airlift Group on 8 January 1966
Redesignated 171st Aeromedical Airlift Group on 1 July 1968
Redesignated 171st Air Refueling Wing on 1 November 1972 (non-Operational, 15 December 1990 – 31 May 1991)

=== Assignments ===
- Pennsylvania Air National Guard, 1 February 1961

Gained by: Eastern Transport Air Force, (EASTAF), Military Air Transport Service
Gained by: Twenty-First Air Force, Military Airlift Command, 8 January 1966
Gained by: Eighth Air Force, Strategic Air Command, 1 July 1976

Component 147th Air Refueling Squadron attached to United States Central Command Air Forces (CENTAF), 15 December 1990 – 31 May 1991

Gained by: Air Combat Command, 1 June 1992
Gained by: Air Mobility Command, 1 June 1993 – Present

=== Components ===
- 171st Operations Group, 1 October 1993 – Present
- 147th Aeromedical Transport Squadron (later 147th Air Refueling Squadron), 1 February 1961 – 1 October 1992

=== Stations ===
- Greater Pittsburgh (later Greater Pittsburgh International and then Pittsburgh International) Airport, 1 February 1961

Operated from: Scott Air Force Base, Illinois, 13 May – 12 December 1968
Elements operated from: King Abdul Aziz Air Base, Jeddah, Saudi Arabia, 15 December 1990 – 31 May 1991
Designated: Pittsburgh IAP Air Reserve Station, 1991-Present

=== Aircraft ===
- C-119J Flying Boxcar, 1961–1963
- C-121G Super Constellation, 1963–1972
- C-131 Samaritan, 1968
- KC-97L Stratotanker, 1972–1977
- KC-135A Stratotanker, 1977–1982
- KC-135E Stratotanker, 1982–2004
- KC-135T Stratotanker, 2004–Present

=== Aircraft flying in this unit ===
KC-135T
Tail #	58-0045
Tail #	58-0054
Tail #	58-0055
Tail #	58-0060
Tail #	58-0072
Tail #	58-0074
Tail #	58-0077
Tail #	58-0084
Tail #	58-0099
Tail #	58-0112
Tail #	58-0117
Tail #	59-1460
Tail #	59-1467
Tail #	59-1468
Tail #	59-1504
Tail #	62-3552
