= Pittsburgh IAP Air Reserve Station =

United States Air Force base

Pittsburgh International Airport Air Reserve Station
- Moon Township, Pennsylvania; Near Coraopolis, Pennsylvania in the United States of America
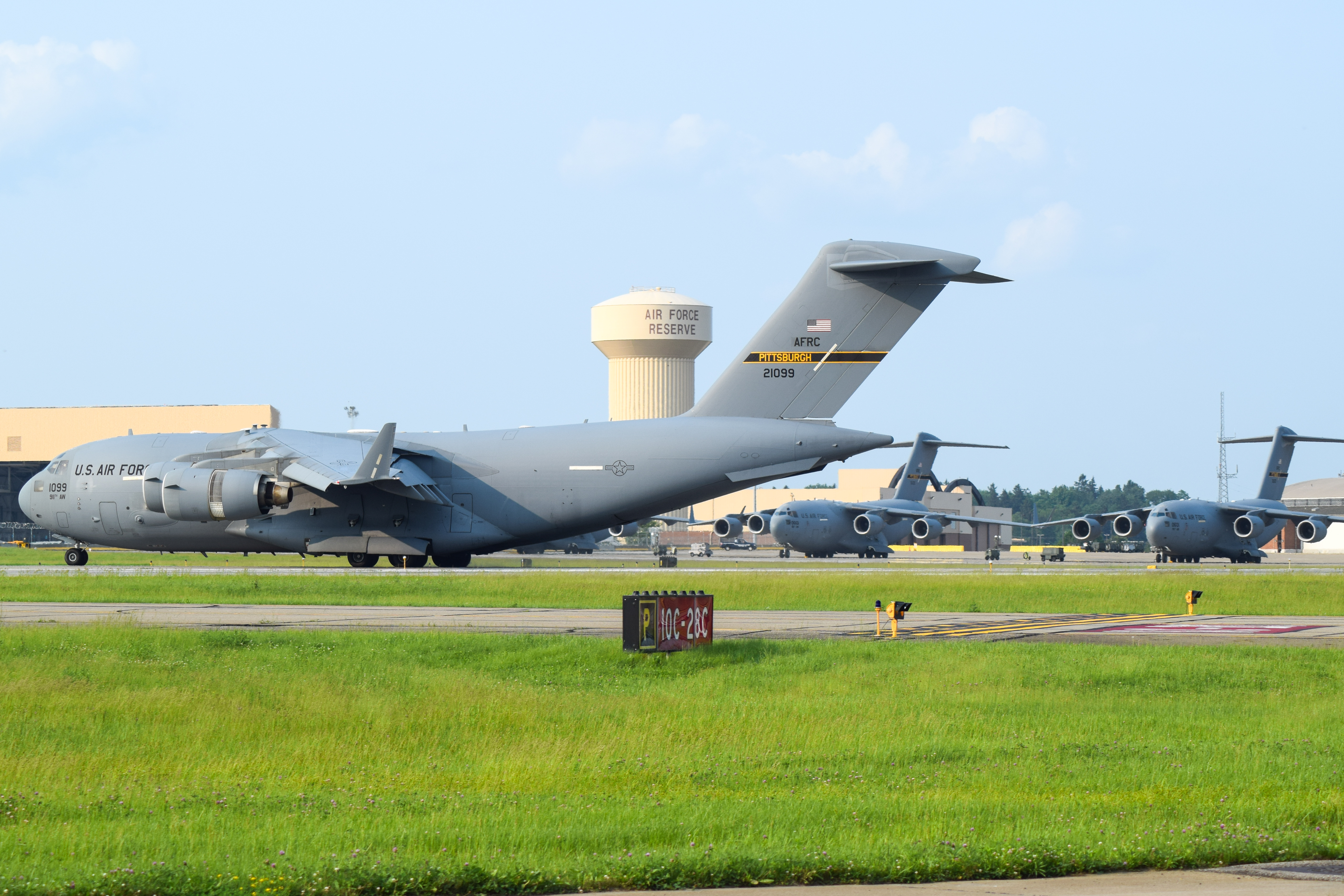
- A C-17A Globemaster III of the 911th Airlift Wing about to exit the runway with its sister ships on the flight-line at Pittsburgh International Airport ARS

Site information
- Type: Air reserve station
- Owner: Department of Defense
- Operator: US Air Force (USAF)
- Controlled by: Air Force Reserve Command (AFRC)
- Condition: Operational
- Website: www.pittsburgh.afrc.af.mil

Location
- Location in the United States
- Coordinates: 40°29′40.49″N 080°12′55.71″W

Site history
- Built: 1944
- In use: 1944 – present

Garrison information
- Garrison: 911th Airlift Wing; 171st Air Refueling Wing

Airfield information
- Identifiers: IATA: PIT, ICAO: KPIT, FAA LID: PIT, WMO: 725200
- Elevation: 366.6 metres (1,203 ft) AMSL
Runways
Direction	Length and surface
10R/28L	3,505.2 metres (11,500 ft) concrete
10C/28C	3,284.2 metres (10,775 ft) asphalt/concrete
10L/28R	3,201 metres (10,502 ft) asphalt/concrete
14/32	2,469.1 metres (8,101 ft) concrete
- Airfield shared with Pittsburgh International Airport; Source: Federal Aviation Administration

Pittsburgh IAP Air Reserve Station is a United States Air Force base, located at Pittsburgh International Airport and in Moon Township, Pennsylvania. It is located 12.1 miles (19.5 km) west-northwest of Pittsburgh, Pennsylvania.

== Overview ==
Pittsburgh IAP ARS is the home station of the Air Force Reserve Command's (AFRC) 911th Airlift Wing (911 AW). The 911 AW is part of the 4th Air Force, and its 758th Airlift Squadron flies eight C-17A Globemaster III strategic airlift aircraft. It includes approximately 1,220 Air Force Reserve members. The unit employs approximately 320 civilians, including more than 180 Air Reserve Technicians (ART) holding dual civilian and military positions. If mobilization occurs, 911 AW units deploy as part of the Air Mobility Command. The 911 AW hosts an average of 20 military flight operations per week in its role as host to the region's defense center.

The 171st Air Refueling Wing (171 ARW) of the Pennsylvania Air National Guard on the airport's southwestern side is also an Air Mobility Command (AMC)-gained organization and operates sixteen KC-135T Stratotanker air refueling aircraft, providing air refueling and air mobility/strategic airlift services worldwide. The 171 ARW is one of three flying wings in the Pennsylvania Air National Guard and has over 400 full-time staff, consisting of Active Guard and Reserve (AGR), dual civilian-military status Air Reserve Technicians (ART) and other USAF civilians, as well as over 1,000 "traditional" part-time Air National Guard personnel.

== Civil Air Patrol ==
One of the first Civil Air Patrol (CAP) Aviation Cadet Programs in the United States was established at the then-Pittsburgh Army Air Base in 1943. Since then, the CAP has had a continuous presence on the Air Reserve Station and is considered a Flagship Unit. As a key partner with the Air Force Reserve and Air National Guard units on Base, the CAP Squadron was a founding member of the Wings Over Pittsburgh Air Show and hosts an annual family picnic for Air Force and military families in the Metro Pittsburgh area.

== Wings over Pittsburgh ==
Until 2017, Pittsburgh's military heritage was also rekindled each summer as the complex hosted one of the largest air shows on the east coast, Wings over Pittsburgh. The first show was held on 4 and 5 June 2000. Roughly 200,000 spectators attended the two-day show in 2005.

The military end of the airport complex has also been mentioned as the best relocation site for the region's Base Exchange (BX), operated by the Army and Air Force Exchange Service (AAFES). The 2008 scheduled closing of the nearby Charles E. Kelley Support Facility and its Post Exchange (PX) brought PIT the opportunity to host the new BX facility on its military side.

== History ==
Founded as a military airfield for the United States Army Air Forces to answer the region's defense needs during World War II, the airfield was a key training facility for Army Air Force Air Transport Command Aircrews. The 6th Ferrying Service Detachment was activated at the airfield on 15 July 1943, providing repair facilities for aircraft in transit between manufacturing facilities on the West Coast and Midwest to East Coast aerial ports for delivery to overseas units. Also, the 60th College Training Detachment (Army Air Forces Training Command) provided military training at the airfield.

After the war, Pittsburgh Municipal Airport became a part of the Air Force Reserve, with the 444th Army Air Force (Later Air Force) Reserve Training Detachment being established at the civil airport.

In January 1951 the USAF Air Defense Command (ADC) established the active-duty 71st Fighter-Interceptor Squadron at the airport, to provide for the air defense of the Greater Pittsburgh area. During this time the Squadron was led by the legendary Robin Olds. The unit was equipped with F-86A Sabre interceptors and was under the command of the 1st Fighter-Interceptor Wing at George AFB, California, being detached to the Eastern Air Defense Force, Stewart AFB, New York. In February 1953, ADC activated the 500th Air Defense Group at PIT, along with several support squadrons to support the interceptors, which were upgraded to the F-86D model in March. In 1955 the 71st FIS was re-designated as the 42d Fighter-Interceptor Squadron, the 500th ADG being re designated as the 54th Fighter Group (Air Defense), to honor notable World War II units.

In 1947, the PA ANG 112th Fighter Group was formed at Pittsburgh Airport, its origins being the World War II 350th Fighter Group. A component of Air Defense Command, the 146th Fighter Squadron operated various types of interceptors until 1975, when it was re-equipped with A-7D Corsair IIs and became part of Tactical Air Command. In 1991, the 112th was re-designated as an Air Refueling Group and became part of Strategic Air Command (SAC). In June 1992 it was reassigned to Air Mobility Command upon the inactivation of SAC. The 112th ARG was inactivated on 1 October 1993, with the 146th ARS transferring to the 171st Air Refueling Wing.

== See also ==
- Pennsylvania World War II Army Airfields
- Aerospace Defense Command Fighter Squadrons
