= 350th Fighter Group =

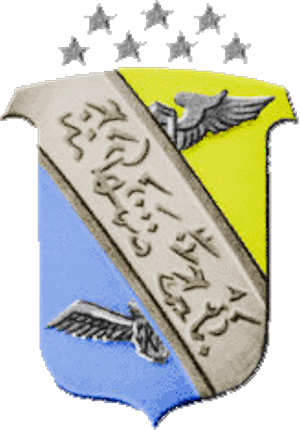
- Emblem of the 350th Fighter Group
- Active: 1942–1945
- Country: United States
- Branch: United States Army Air Force
- Type: Fighter
- Engagements: European theater of World War II
- Decorations: Distinguished Unit Citation

The 350th Fighter Group was an air combat unit of the United States Army Air Force formed in 1942 and inactivated in 1945. The fighter group consisted of 345th, 346th and 347th Fighter Squadron. The group was formed in England in 1942 flying Bell P-39 Airacobras and participated in the Mediterranean and North African Campaigns of World War II. 350th Fighter Group was based in North Africa, in Algeria and Morocco from January to July 1943. They then moved on to the Mediterranean islands of Sardinia and Corsica in November 1943 and February 1944 and were based in Italy from September 1944 to July 1945. After the group was inactivated on 7 November 1945 at Seymour Johnson Air Force Base following the end of the war. It was redesignated the 112th Fighter Group and placed under the control of the Pennsylvania Air National Guard in 1946.

== History ==
See 112th Air Refueling Group for additional postwar lineage and history

The group's air echelon was activated in England under Eighth Air Force. It was equipped with export versions of the P-39 Airacobra originally ordered for the French Air Force in early 1940 which were diverted to England after the Fall of France. In England, the P-39s remained in storage in the crates in which they had arrived. By the summer of 1942 the number of American pilot volunteers in the Royal Air Force serving in England had grown to a few hundred in number. In urgent need of additional fighters to support the forthcoming North African invasion, American planners decided to combine these two assets already in England and at the end of September 1942 a number of American pilots in the RAF were invited to transfer to the USAAF.

On 1 October, pilots from the USAAF 31st and 52d Fighter Groups, who had flown P-39s in the United States prior to their arrival in England in June 1942, were ordered to report to RAF Duxford to help activate a new Group, designated as the 350th Fighter Group with three subordinate Squadrons, the 345th, 346th and 347th . (The RAF American Eagle Squadrons were re-designated the 4th Fighter Group about this time but the 350th was the only Group activated from scratch in Europe).

At the same time, some of the American pilots who had just transferred from the RAF were ordered to the new 350th Fighter Group to make up the other half of the original aircrew roster. As it turned out, the RAF depot responsible for supporting the operation was completely over committed and could not uncrate and assemble the Group's P-39 aircraft in time to meet the invasion plan. Airacobras did finally begin equipping the group in numbers by mid-December 1942, and two weeks later the pilots began flying to French Morocco. In the middle of the English winter, many of the ex RAF pilots managed to acquire only some 20 hours of flying time in the new aircraft type by the time they launched for Africa.

The Group's 75 pilots flew their P-39Ls (346th Sq) and P-39-400 (345th Sq and 347th Sq) fighters from RAF Portreath and RAF Predannack Down, England, to Port Lyautey Airfield, French Morocco, during the period 3 January to 28 February 1943. Sixty-one arrived at the destination airfield. Ten pilots that encountered head winds, instead of the forecast tail wind (the only fuel reserve on the 1200-mile, six- to seven-hour over water flight) were forced to land in Portugal where they were interned. One more landed in Portugal after losing all electrical systems. One flight that broke up in a severe line squall over the Bay of Biscay lost one pilot (KIA)—he was flying alone, probably still on the deck, at max range cruise settings (165 to 175 MPH), when he was likely ambushed, and was shot down by a patrolling Junkers Ju 88 pilot of KG 40 of Fliegerführer Atlantik who claimed the kill; one pilot, after closing on the French coast to determine his location, ended up short of fuel and crash-landed in Spain, where he was interned; another pilot on that flight became lost and crash-landed in Ireland while attempting to return to England.

The first elements of the Air Echelon, and the Ground Echelon, finally joined each other at Oujda Airfield, French Morocco, a few days after their arrival in North Africa on 3 January 1943. The Ground Echelon had arrived off North Africa in the first week of November 1942 from the United States with the Operation Torch invasion fleet.

The group operated with Twelfth Air Force from January 1943 until the end of the war, flying patrol and interception missions, protecting convoys, escorting aircraft, flying reconnaissance missions, engaging in interdiction operations, and providing close support for ground forces. It operated against targets in Tunisia until the end of that campaign. The Group flew air defense and fighter-bomber missions with its P-39 Airacobras and primarily fighter bomber missions with its P-47 Thunderbolts.

The unit defended the coast of Algeria during the summer and fall of 1943. Afterward, it operated primarily in support of Allied forces in Italy until the end of the war, bombing and strafing rail facilities, shipping docks, radar and transformer stations, power lines, bridges, motor transports, and military installations. From June to September 1943 each squadron was assigned two P-38s to intercept and destroy high-flying Luftwaffe reconnaissance aircraft sent to photograph the allied invasion fleet gathering along the North African coast for the invasion of Sicily.

It received a DUC for action in western Italy on 6 April 1944 when, despite intense flak and attacks by numerous enemy interceptors, the group flew ten missions, hitting troops, bridges, vehicles, barracks, and air warning installations. It also covered Allied landings on Elba in June 1944 and supported the invasion of southern France in August.

From South America, The First Brazilian Fighter Group joined the 350th Fighter Group as a fourth squadron in October 1944.

1st Lt Raymond L Knight was awarded the Medal of Honor for missions on 24 and 25 April 1945: voluntarily leading attacks through intense antiaircraft fire against enemy airdromes in northern Italy, Knight was responsible for eliminating more than 20 German planes intended for assaults on Allied forces; attempting to return his shattered plane to base after an attack on 25 April, he crashed in the Apennines. Knight was the only member of the entire 12th AF in World War II to receive the Medal of Honor for heroism in the air.

As the war in Italy came to a close, the squadrons of the 350th FG were shuffled as eligible members were sent home and replacement personnel were brought in. Most boarded boats bound for the Pacific Theater, but never got there as the atomic bomb brought the war to an end.

The 350th FG moved to the port of embarkation at Naples, Italy, on 14 July 1945. On 1 August 1945, the group sailed for combat operations in the Pacific Theater. The atomic bombs were dropped on Japan while the Group was en route and provisioning in Panama City on the Pacific Ocean side of the Canal Zone. V-J day was declared, signaling the end of hostilities in World War II. The ship carrying the Group was directed to return to the US and the 350th Fighter Group and its American squadrons were inactivated on 7 November 1945, at Seymour Johnson Field, Goldsboro, NC, after three years and one month of operations. The inactivation was to last less than a year.

On 24 May 1946, the 350th was re-designated 112th Fighter Group and allotted to the Pennsylvania Air National Guard (PA-ANG). The 345th FS became the 146th Fighter Squadron, the 346th FS became the 147th Fighter Squadron and the 347th FS was redesignated the 148th Fighter Squadron.

The 112th Fighter Group continued flying P-47 Thunderbolts, and was extended federal recognition on 22 April 1947.

=== Lineage ===
- Activated in England on 1 October 1942 by special authority granted to Eighth Air Force prior to constitution as 350th Fighter Group on 2 October 1942

Inactivated on 7 November 1945

- Redesignated 350th Fighter Group. Allotted to ANG (Pennsylvania) on 24 May 1946.

=== Assignments ===
- Eighth Air Force, 1 October 1942
- VIII Fighter Command, 2 October 1942 – 6 January 1943
- Twelfth Air Force, 6 January 1943 – 14 July 1945
- III Fighter Command, 25 August – 7 November 1945

=== Components ===
- 345th Fighter Squadron: 1 October 1942 – 7 November 1945
- 346th Fighter Squadron: 1 October 1942 – 7 November 1945
- 347th Fighter Squadron: 1 October 1942 – 7 November 1945
- Brazilian 1st Fighter Group, October 1944 – May 1945

=== Stations ===
- RAF Bushey Hall (AAF-341), England, 1 October 1942
- RAF Duxford (AAF-357), England, October 1942
- Oujda Airfield, French Morocco, 6 January 1943
- Oran Es Sénia Airport, Oran, Algeria, 14 February 1943
- Maison Blanche Airport, Algiers, Algeria, May 1943
- Rerhaia Airfield, Algeria, c. 17 July 1943
- Sardinia, 5 November 1943
- Corsica, 6 February 1944
- Tarquinia Airfield, Italy, 8 September 1944
- Pisa Airfield, Italy, 2 December 1944 – 14 July 1945
- Seymour Johnson Field, North Carolina, 25 August – 7 November 1945

=== Aircraft ===
- P-39 Airacobra, 1942–1944
- P-400 Airacobra, 1942–1944
- P-38 Lightning, 1943
- P-47 Thunderbolt, 1944–1945
