= Tarquinia Airfield =

Abandoned World War II airfield in Italy

Tarquinia Airfield
- Part of Twelfth Air Force

Site information
- Type: Military airfield
- Controlled by: United States Army Air Forces

Location
- Coordinates: 42°12′41.29″N 011°44′03.50″E

Site history
- Built: 1943
- In use: 1943-1944

Location of Tarquinia Airfield, Italy

Tarquinia Airfield is an abandoned World War II military airfield in the Lazio region of central Italy, about 6 km South-Southwest of Tarquinia.

It was an all-weather temporary field built by the XII Engineer Command using a graded earth compacted surface, with a prefabricated hessian (burlap) surfacing known as PHS. PHS was made of an asphalt-impregnated jute which was rolled out over the compacted surface over a square mesh track (SMT) grid of wire joined in 3-inch squares. Pierced Steel Planking was also used for parking areas, as well as for dispersal sites, when it was available. In addition, tents were used for billeting and also for support facilities; an access road was built to the existing road infrastructure; a dump for supplies, ammunition, and gasoline drums, along with a drinkable water and minimal electrical grid for communications and station lighting.

Once completed it was turned over for use by the United States Army Air Force Twelfth Air Force during the Italian Campaign. Known units assigned were:

- 325th Fighter Group, 13 August 1944 - 17 August 1944 P-51 Mustang
- 27th Fighter Group, October-3 December 1944, P-40 Warhawk
- 350th Fighter Group, 8 September-3 December 1944, P-47 Thunderbolt
- 62d Troop Carrier Group, 8 January-25 May 1945, C-47 Skytrain

Today the site of the airfield is indistinguishable from the many agricultural fields in the area.
