= Oujda-Angad Airport =

Airport in Morocco

Oujda-Angad Airport مطار وجدة أنجاد (Arabic)
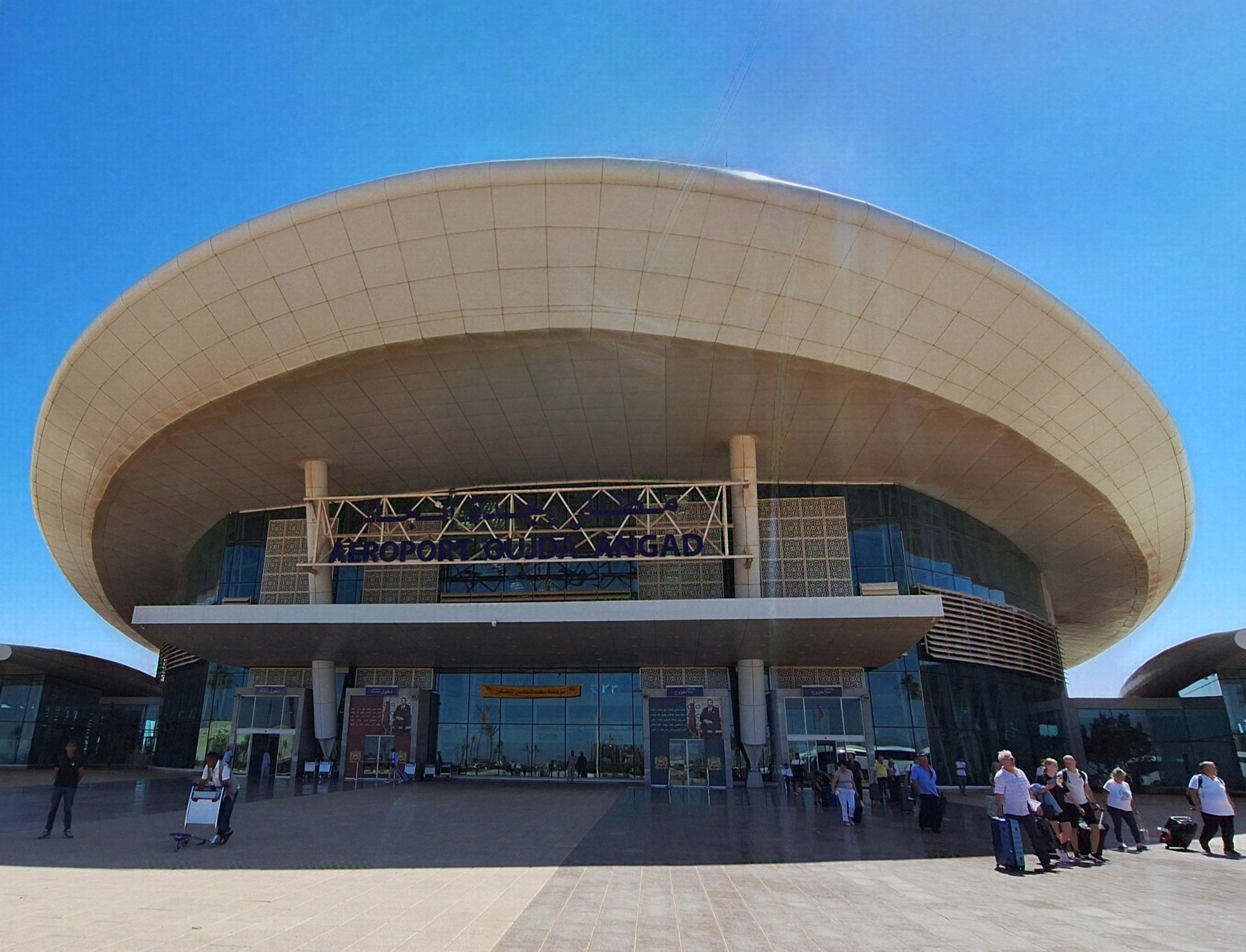
- IATA: OUD; ICAO: GMFO

Summary
- Airport type: Public
- Operator: Airports of Morocco
- Serves: Oujda, Morocco
- Elevation AMSL: 1,535 ft (468 m)
- Coordinates: 34°47′14″N 001°55′26″W

Map
- Location of airport in Morocco

Runways
Direction	Length		Surface
Direction	m	ft	Surface
06/24	3,000	9,843	Asphalt
13/31	3,000	9,843	Asphalt

Statistics (2024)
- Passengers: 1,023,101
- Passenger change 23-24: ▲10.5%
- Source: DAFIF

Oujda-Angad Airport (مطار وجدة أنجاد) (IATA: OUD, ICAO: GMFO) is an airport serving Oujda, a city in the Oriental region in Morocco. It is located about 12 kilometres (7 mi) north of Oujda and about 600 kilometres (373 mi) northeast of Casablanca, near the Algerian border.

== History ==
During World War II, the airport was used as a military airfield by the Royal Air Force (RAF) and United States Army Air Forces Twelfth Air Force during the North African campaign. It was called RAF Oujda and Oujda Airfield. Known units assigned were:

- HQ 5th Bombardment Wing, December 1942 – January 1943
- HQ 52d Troop Carrier Wing, 8 May – July 1943
- 68th Reconnaissance Group, November 1942 – 24 March 1943 (Various photo-reconnaissance aircraft)
- 313th Troop Carrier Group, 9 May – 16 June 1943 Douglas C-47 Skytrain
- 319th Bombardment Group, 3 March – 25 April 1943 Martin B-26 Marauder
- 350th Fighter Group, 6 January – 14 February 1943 P-39/P-400 Airacobra

After the Americans moved out their active units in mid-1943, the airport was used as a stopover and landing field for Air Transport Command aircraft on the Casablanca-Algiers transport route. When WWII ended, the control of the airfield was returned to civil authorities.

== Facilities ==
The airport resides at an elevation of 1,535 feet (468 m) above mean sea level. It has two runways designated 06/24 and 13/31 each with an asphalt/bitumen surface and each measuring 3,000 by 45 metres (9,843 ft × 148 ft).

== Airlines and destinations ==
The following airlines operate regular scheduled and charter flights at Oujda-Angad Airport:

Airlines	Destinations
Air Arabia	Brussels, Marseille, Murcia, Paris–Charles de Gaulle, Rabat; Seasonal: Barcelona, Charleroi, Lille, Lyon, Montpellier
Air Nostrum	Seasonal charter: Lisbon, Porto
ASL Airlines France	Seasonal: Paris–Charles de Gaulle, Strasbourg
Brussels Airlines	Seasonal: Brussels
Royal Air Maroc	Casablanca, Paris–Orly; Seasonal: Brussels, Düsseldorf, Paris–Charles de Gaulle, Rotterdam
Ryanair	Agadir, Barcelona, Beauvais, Charleroi, Marrakesh, Marseille, Tangier, Toulouse, Weeze
Transavia	Paris–Orly; Seasonal: Bastia, Lyon, Nantes, Rotterdam/The Hague
TUI fly Belgium	Brussels; Seasonal: Antwerp, Eindhoven, Lille, Paris–Orly

== Traffic statistics ==
Item	2007	2006	2005	2004	2003	2002
Movements	3546	3108	3316	3031	2303	2199
Passengers	315,006	242,080	225,444	193,036	180,406	168,385
Cargo (metric tons)	451.09	451.09	202.08	197.14	260.99	618.10
