= Rerhaia Airfield =

Historical airfield in Algeria

Rerhaia Airfield
- Part of Twelfth Air Force

Site information
- Type: Military airfield
- Controlled by: United States Army Air Forces

Location
- Coordinates: 36°45′12.30″N 003°23′22.54″E

Site history
- Built: 1943
- In use: 1943

Location of Rerhaia Airfield, Algeria

Rerhaia Airfield was a World War II military airfield in Algeria, located approximately 3 km northwest of Boudouaou, about 32 km east-southeast of Algiers. It was used by the United States Army Air Force Twelfth Air Force 350th Fighter Group between July and November 1943 during the North African Campaign against the German Afrika Korps.

It was also used by the 416th Night Fighter Squadron, which flew Bristol Beaufighters from the field between 27 December 1943 – 25 January 1944.

Today, the remnants of the main runway and other areas can be seen in aerial photography.
