= Harrisburg International Airport =

Airport in Harrisburg, Pennsylvania, US

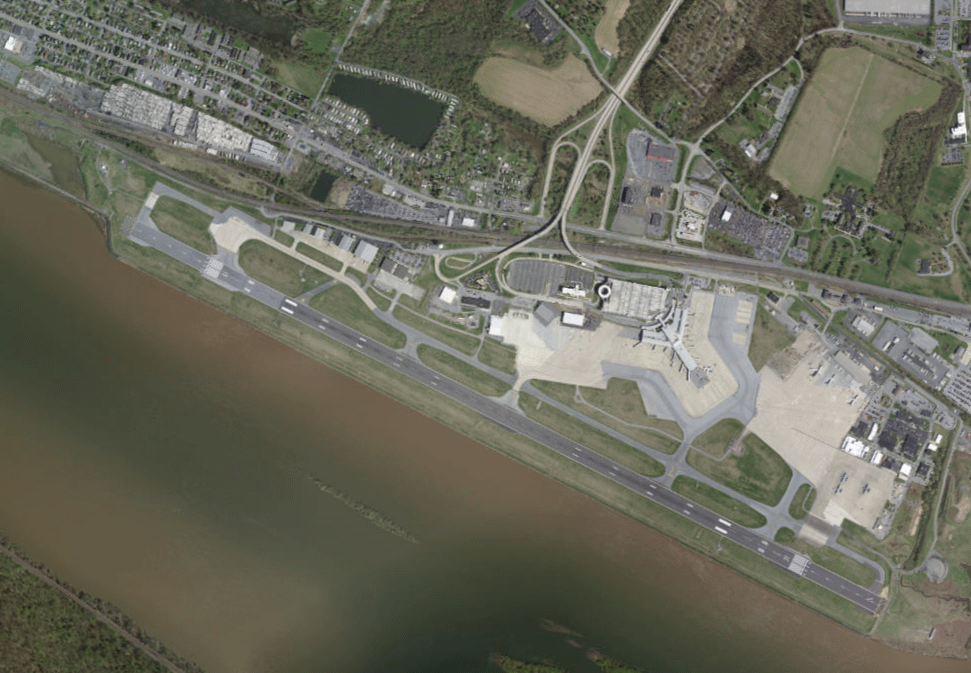
- 2018 aerial view of Harrisburg International Airport
- IATA: MDT; ICAO: KMDT; FAA LID: MDT

Summary
- Airport type: Public/military
- Owner/Operator: Susquehanna Area Regional Airport Authority
- Serves: Harrisburg, Pennsylvania, U.S.
- Location: Lower Swatara Township, Pennsylvania, U.S.
- Hub for: Wiggins Airways
- Elevation AMSL: 310 ft (94 m)
- Coordinates: 40°11′35″N 076°45′48″W
- Website: www.FlyHIA.com

Maps
- FAA diagram of the airport
- Interactive map of Harrisburg International Airport

Runways
Direction	Length		Surface
Direction	ft	m	Surface
13/31	10,001	3,048	Asphalt

Statistics (2025)
- Aircraft operations: 53,463
- Passengers: 1,623,324
- Sources: HIA Airport and the FAA

Harrisburg International Airport (IATA: MDT, ICAO: KMDT, FAA LID: MDT) is a public airport in Lower Swatara Township, Pennsylvania, United States, nine miles (14 km) southeast of Harrisburg. It is owned by the Susquehanna Area Regional Airport Authority.

The airport code MDT refers to Middletown, the city name specified on the postal address of the airport. Planes landing at MDT from the south are often routed near Three Mile Island Nuclear Generating Station a few miles from the airport. The airport, frequently referred to as HIA, is the primary commercial airport in South Central Pennsylvania and is the third-busiest airport in Pennsylvania for passenger enplanements and cargo shipments behind Philadelphia International Airport and Pittsburgh International Airport. In terms of total yearly aircraft operations within Pennsylvania, MDT is the fifth-busiest, behind Lancaster and Lehigh Valley International, according to FAA data from 2024 and 2025.

== History ==
=== 19th century ===
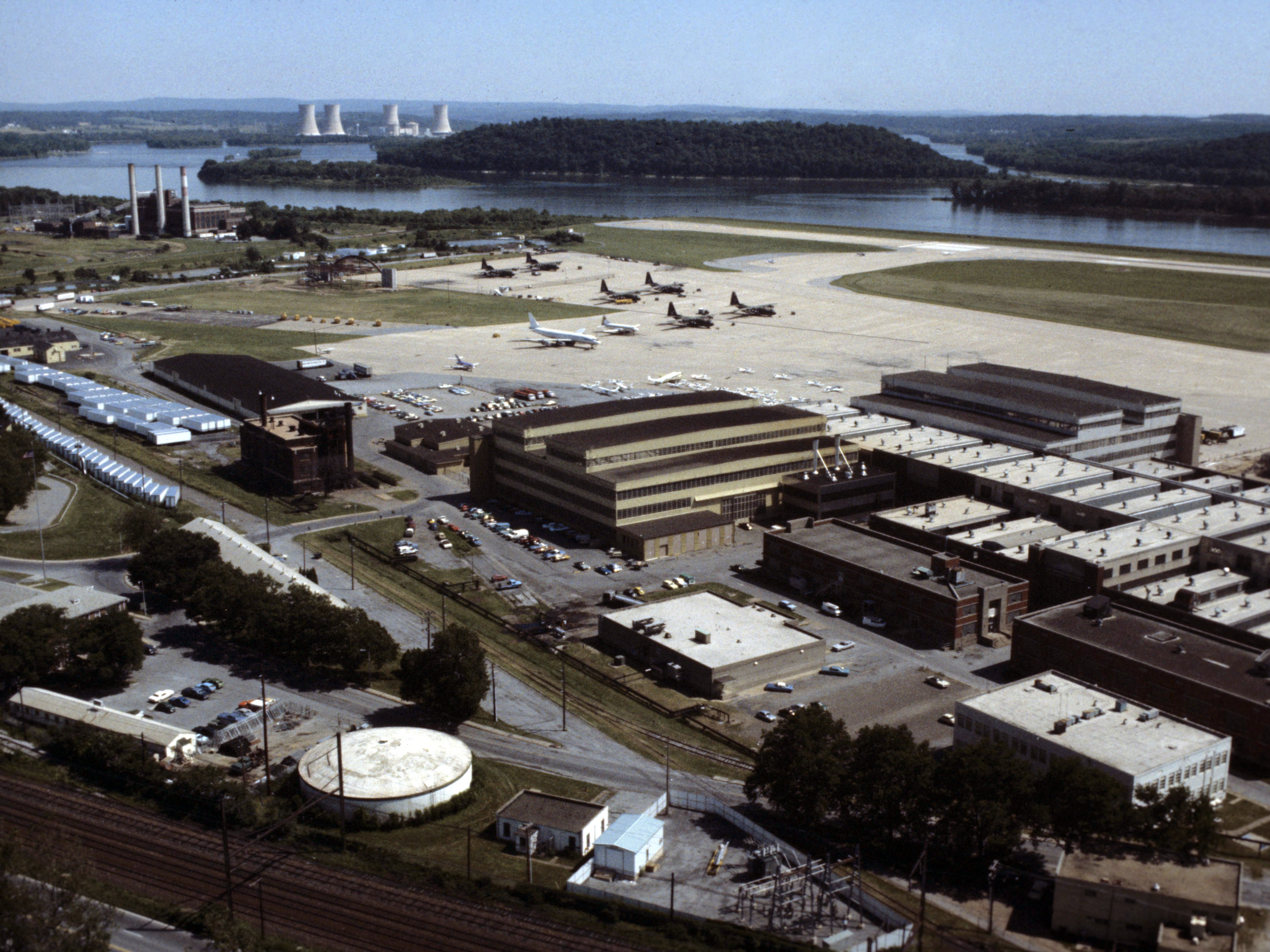
The airport, with Three Mile Island Nuclear Generating Station in the background a few weeks after the 1979 accident

Harrisburg International Airport has been serving south-central Pennsylvania since the late 19th century. Beginning in 1898, the Signal Corps of the U.S. Army was stationed there. This was followed by the first military airplanes landing in 1918 at what had become Olmsted Field of the fledgling U.S. Army Air Service.

=== 20th century ===
The Middletown Air Depot, later renamed Middletown Air Materiel Area at Olmsted, provided logistical and maintenance support of military aircraft until it closed in 1969. In 1968, airline flights moved from Capital City Airport to the former U.S. Air Force base, renamed as Olmsted State Airport. The airport was renamed Harrisburg International Airport in 1973. Architect William Pereira designed the new terminals, completed in 1973.

From April 1969 through the completion of its May 1971 acquisition by Universal Airlines, American Flyers Airline, a supplemental air carrier, was based at Olmsted State Airport. American Flyers flew charter flights, including to Europe.

In the mid 1970s, the airport was a leading center for exporting cattle by air. In 1974, 33 flights departed the airport with Holstein cattle to countries such as France, Italy, Kuwait, Japan, Turkey and Uganda, on "stretch" Douglas DC-8s from airlines such as Flying Tiger, Seaboard World and Airlift International.

Prior to deregulation, Harrisburg was served by Allegheny Airlines with flights to several Northeast destinations, Trans World Airlines with flights to Chicago, and Altair Airlines with commuter flights within Pennsylvania. Monmouth Airlines, a New Jersey commuter airline, began flights from Olmsted Airport to Kennedy Airport and Washington National Airport in December 1970.

In 1998, the Commonwealth transferred ownership to the Susquehanna Area Regional Airport Authority (SARAA). The Authority board consists of community volunteers appointed to staggered, five-year terms by the elected officials from Cumberland, Dauphin, and York counties, the cities of Harrisburg and York, and Fairview and Lower Swatara townships.

=== 21st century ===
A new 360,000 square-foot terminal was completed in 2004. It cost $120 million and was designed by the Sheward Partnership.

As of 2008, about 1,400 people work in the system of Harrisburg International Airport.

The airport became a Class C airspace in July 2024, upgrading from the previous Class D and TRSA. Discussions on the airspace change began in 2019.

As of 2026, four airlines serve Harrisburg International Airport, including Allegiant Air, American Airlines, United Airlines, and Delta Air Lines.

Frontier Airlines began service to Harrisburg in the late 2010's. During their time at MDT, they served Orlando, Denver, and Raleigh before the COVID-19 pandemic. Post-pandemic, the airline's sole destination from MDT was Orlando. The airline ceased all service to MDT on April 13, 2026, citing network reconstruction as the reason.

== Facilities and aircraft ==
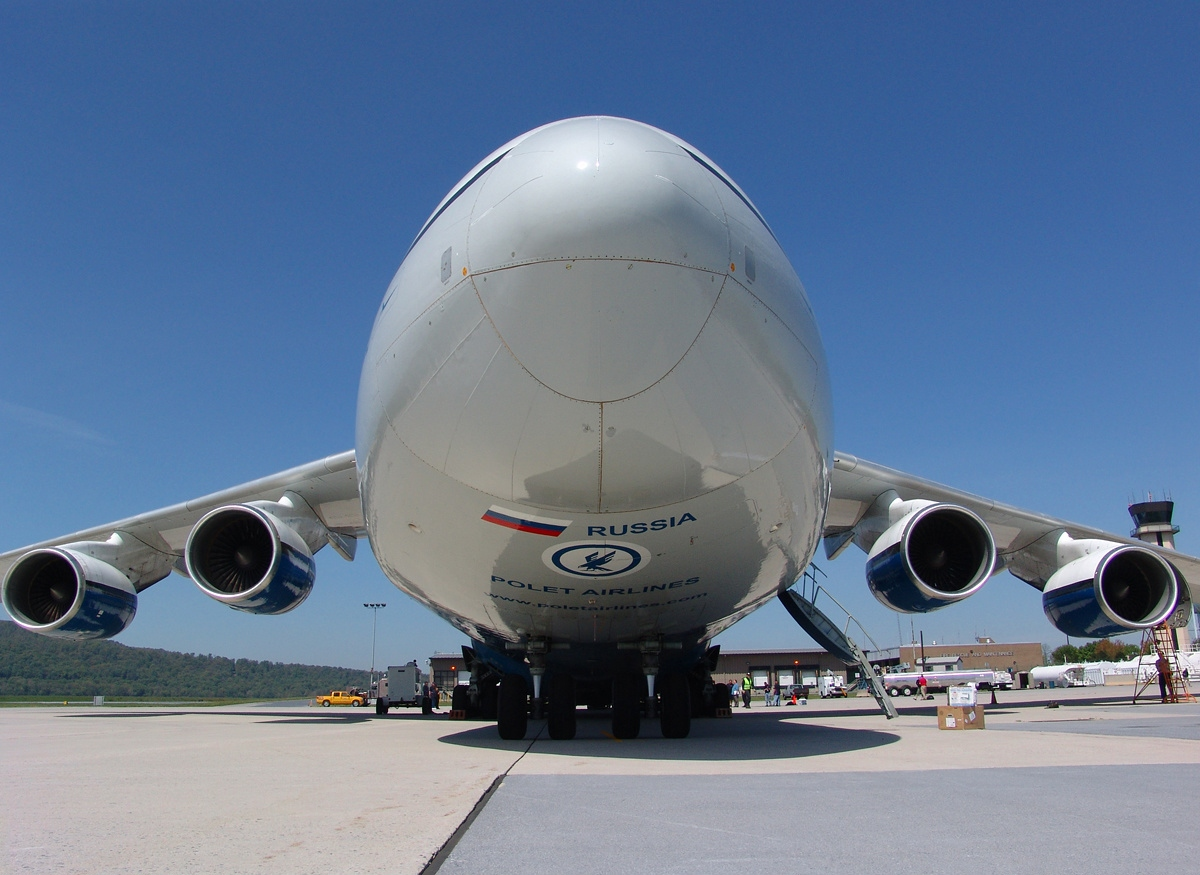
An Antonov An-124 Ruslan at the airport in 2007

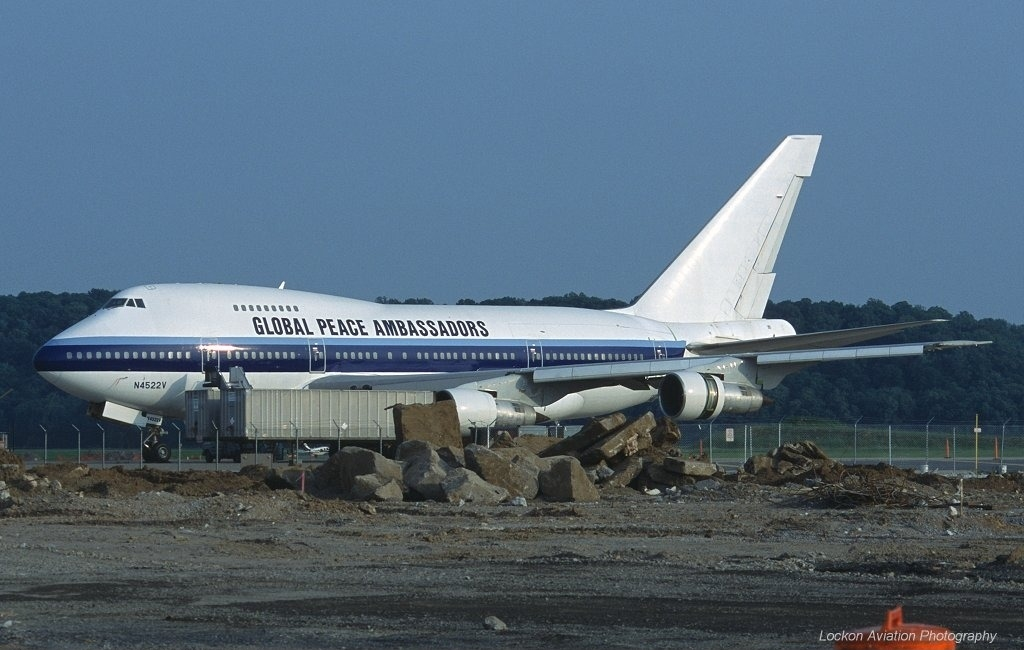
A private Boeing 747SP at the airport in 2003

Harrisburg International Airport covers 680 acres (280 ha) at an elevation of 310 feet (94 m) above mean sea level. It has one asphalt runway, 13/31, 10,001 by 200 feet (3,048 by 61 m).

Runway 13 has a CAT III approach allowing operations down to 600 feet (180 m) RVR (Runway Visual Range). The airport has a Surface Movement Guidance Control System (SMGCS) that allows aircraft and vehicle ground movements during reduced visibility (below 1,200 feet (370 m) RVR down to 600 feet (180 m) RVR).

The airfield has a 140-foot control tower and associated approach control staffed and operated by FAA air traffic controllers.

The terminal has 12 gates and is a pier finger layout near the middle of the airfield, almost parallel to the runway. Delta Air Lines uses A1 and A3. United Airlines uses B1 and B3. Allegiant Air uses B6. American Airlines uses B2, and C1–C3. Gate A2, B4 and B5 are currently unused.

=== Ground transportation ===
Built in 2004, and attached to the new terminal building via a climate-controlled sky bridge, the Multi-Modal Transportation Facility (MMTF) is a four-story facility that handles all ground transportation. The top three levels have 2,504 parking places for Short-Term Hourly, Daily, and Long-Term public parking. The first level accommodates all limos, taxis, hotel shuttles, public and charter buses, plus the rental car ready/return lot.

In the first floor lobby area are six rental car counters, restrooms, flight and bus information displays, and a seating area. On the second floor of the lobby area, climate-controlled moving sidewalks connect to the aerial walkway to the terminal.

Route 7 of the Capital Area Transit System runs to downtown Harrisburg and surrounding communities. The Middletown Amtrak Station, about 3 miles (5 km) east of the terminal, has Amtrak service via the Keystone Corridor. There had been a proposal to construct a new rail terminal adjacent to the MMTF, but the final location chosen for the new station is about 2 miles (3.2 km) east, in Middletown.

== Airlines and destinations ==
=== Passenger ===
Airlines	Destinations
Allegiant Air	Jacksonville (FL), Orlando/Sanford, Punta Gorda (FL), Sarasota, St. Petersburg/Clearwater; Seasonal: Fort Lauderdale, Myrtle Beach, Nashville
American Airlines	Charlotte, Chicago–O'Hare, Dallas/Fort Worth
American Eagle	Boston, Charlotte, Chicago–O'Hare, Philadelphia; Seasonal: Miami
Delta Air Lines	Atlanta
Delta Connection	Detroit; Seasonal: Atlanta
United Airlines	Chicago–O'Hare
United Express	Chicago–O'Hare, Washington–Dulles

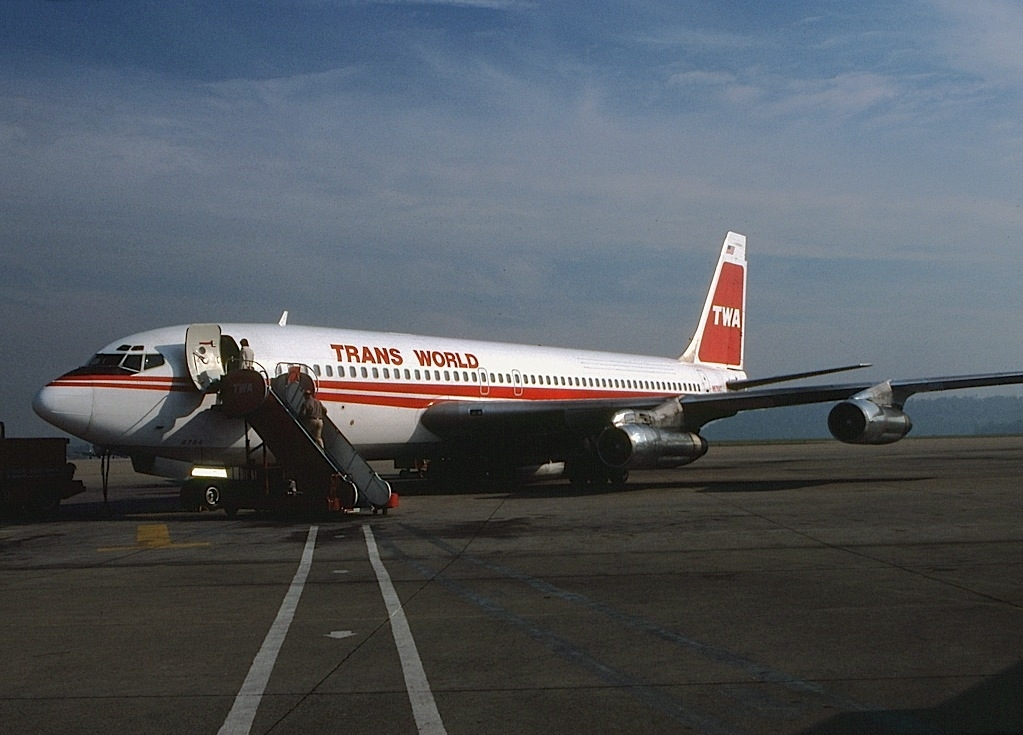
A Trans World Airlines (TWA) Boeing 707 in October 1981

=== Cargo ===
Harrisburg International Airport has freight-forwarding capability. The airport is next to I-76 (Pennsylvania Turnpike), I-83, and I-81, allowing fast transfer of goods. Three major air cargo shippers maintain air service at the east end of the airport in an apron area next to the runway.

== Statistics ==
=== Top destinations ===
Busiest domestic routes from MDT (July 2025 – June 2026)
Rank	City	Passengers	Carriers
1	Chicago–O'Hare, Illinois	172,030	American, United
2	Charlotte, North Carolina	159,290	American
3	Atlanta, Georgia	104,700	Delta
4	Philadelphia, Pennsylvania	68,180	American
5	Dallas/Fort Worth, Texas	55,350	American
6	Detroit, Michigan	52,300	Delta
7	Washington-Dulles, Virginia	46,820	United
8	Orlando–Sanford, Florida	43,870	Allegiant
9	St. Petersburg, Florida	26,260	Allegiant
10	Punta Gorda, Florida	24,340	Allegiant

=== Airline market share ===
Carrier shares (July 2025 – June 2026) Based on enplaned passengers both departing and arriving.
Carrier	Passengers (arriving and departing)
Allegiant	303,000(18.14%)
Piedmont	301,000(18.04%)
American	297,000(17.79%)
Delta	200,000(11.97%)
United	125,000(7.49%)
Other	443,000(26.57%)

Other consists of airlines that serve MDT including Frontier Airlines, GoJet Airlines, PSA Airlines, SkyWest Airlines, Endeavor Air, CommuteAir, Republic Airways, and Envoy Air.

Total airline share (2025)
Rank	Airline	Share
1	American Airlines	42.6%
2	Delta Air Lines	19.2%
3	Allegiant Airlines	18.9%
4	United Airlines	16.8%
5	Frontier Airlines	2.5%

=== Annual traffic ===
Traffic by calendar year
	Passengers	Change from previous year	Cargo (tons)
2013	1,294,632	—	54,344
2014	1,289,487	▼0.40%	48,922
2015	1,173,938	▼8.96%	51,401
2016	1,205,461	▲2.69%	52,807
2017	1,195,763	▼0.80%	51,886
2018	1,294,765	▲8.28%	57,303
2019	1,512,585	▲16.82%	55,268
2020	633,310	▼58.13%	55,430
2021	1,021,110	▲61.36%	63,549
2022	1,256,348	▲23.04%	57,175
2023	1,303,990	▲3.79%	53,940
2024	1,444,778	▲10.8%	48,999
2025	1,623,324	▲12.3%	53,463

== Pennsylvania Air National Guard use ==

Despite the closure of Olmsted AFB in 1969, the US Air Force continues an Air National Guard presence at Harrisburg in the form of Harrisburg Air National Guard Station and the Pennsylvania Air National Guard's 193rd Special Operations Wing (193 SOW), an Air Force Special Operations Command (AFSOC)-gained unit flying the EC-130J Commando Solo aircraft. The 193 SOW is the sole operator of this critical aircraft asset for the entire US Air Force and in 2001 transitioned from the EC-130E to the new EC-130J variant. The wing has seen extensive federal service in recent years in support of Operations Just Cause, Desert Storm, Enduring Freedom and Iraqi Freedom.

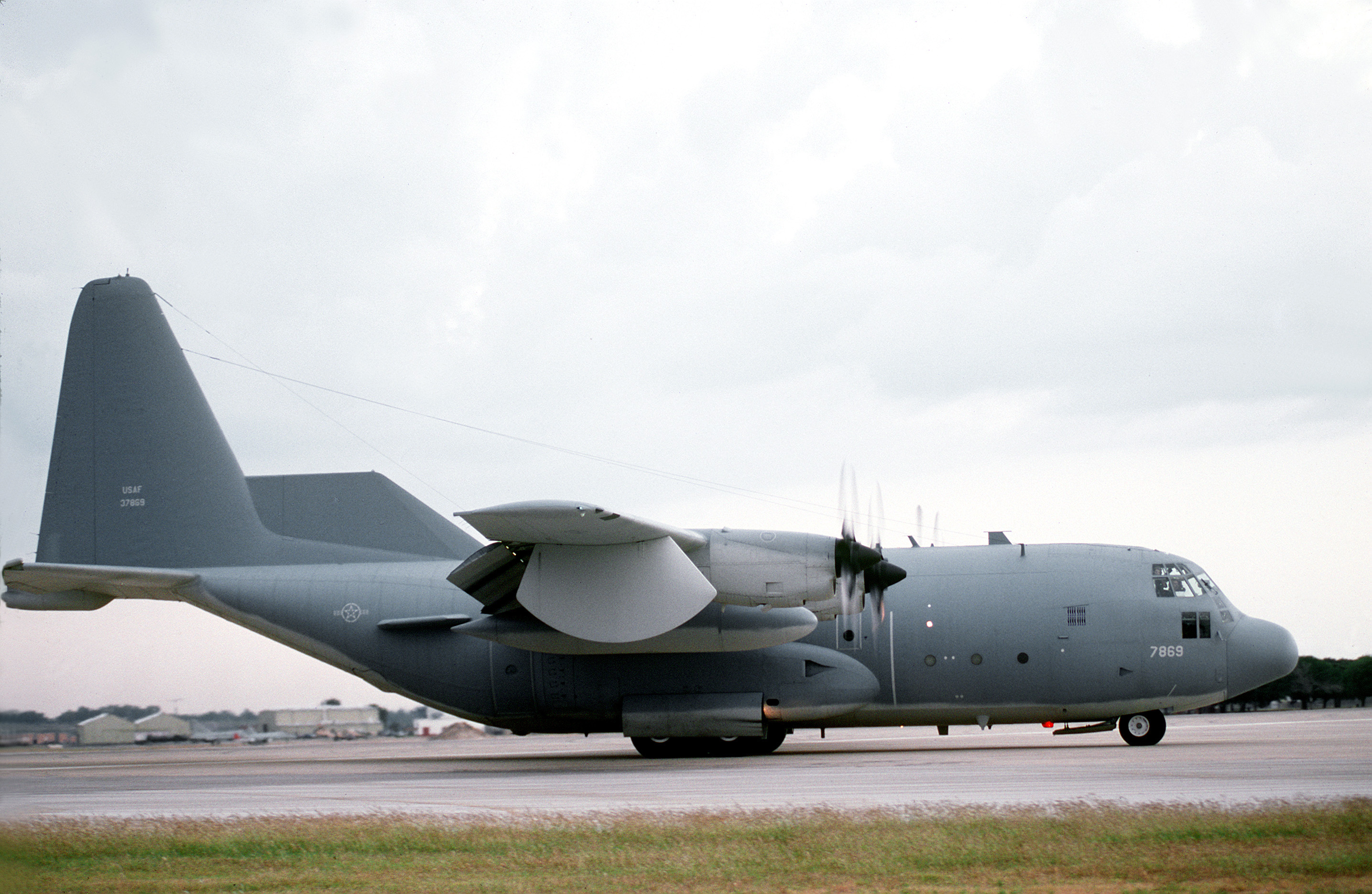
A 193rd SOS Pennsylvania Air National Guard EC-130 in 1992

The Air Force Presidential Airlift Squadron uses MDT as a practice airport for a number of reasons: its runway is long enough for a loaded 747, relatively low traffic, close proximity to Andrews Air Force Base, and the presence of the Air National Guard at MDT.

== See also ==
- Harrisburg Air National Guard Base
- List of airports in Pennsylvania
- Susquehanna Area Regional Airport Authority
