= 270th Engineering Installation Squadron =

- Emblem
- Active: 1949 – present
- Country: United States
- Branch: United States Air Force
- Garrison/HQ: Biddle Air National Guard Base, Pennsylvania, United States of America.
- Motto: "Semper Supremi"
- Mascot: Squirrel

The 270th Engineering Installation Squadron (270th EIS) is a cyberspace engineering & installation unit located at Biddle Air National Guard Base, Pennsylvania, United States of America.

== History ==
The 270th Engineering Installation Squadron was originally activated at Philadelphia International Airport, Philadelphia, Pennsylvania as the 603rd Signal Light Construction Company on 12 April 1949. Federal recognition of the unit was extended on 17 May 1949 when the unit's manpower consisted of 2 officers and 11 Airmen. By 1 Jan. 1951, the unit reached strength of 5 officers and 86 Airmen. When the 111th Bombardment Group, the unit's Pennsylvania Air National Guard host, was mobilized on 10 April 1951 for the Korean War, the 603rd was left as the only Air Guard unit in Philadelphia. Due to the large amount of military air traffic in the area, one officer and six Airmen were placed on permanent duty with a mission to refuel and service military aircraft; maintain operational service and logging record on a 24-hour, 7-day per week basis. The wire construction mission continued with the unit winning several awards for military professionalism.

On 1 Oct. 1952 the unit was reorganized and designated as the 270th Communications Squadron, Operations. The mission was changed from installation to operation of base communications equipment facilities to include telephone and teletype equipment. During annual training periods, unit members were integrated with active-duty Air Force communications units. When the 111th Bombardment Group returned to Philadelphia International Airport from Spokane, Washington, the 270th was relocated to the First Regiment Armory of the National Guard at 335 – 347 North Broad and Callowhill Streets in Philadelphia, Pennsylvania.

The unit then returned to the Philadelphia International Airport and occupied temporary hangars where Atlantic Aviation, now Macquarie Infrastructure Company operates a Fixed-Base Operator Facility. In October 1960 the unit was reorganized and designated the 270th Ground Electronics Engineering Installation Agency (GEEIA) Squadron, and returned to the fixed communications installation mission. The gaining command at the time was the Air Materiel Command.

They were then relocated to Fort Mifflin, Philadelphia until 1963 when the 111th Air Transport Group was reestablished to Willow Grove Naval Air Station, in Horsham, Pennsylvania. At that time, the 270th returned to the Philadelphia International Airport to become the sole military occupant and only Air National Guard unit in Philadelphia.

In May 1970, GEEIA was absorbed into the Air Force Communications Service, which later became the Air Force Communications Command (AFCC). The 270th was designated the 270th Electronics Installation Squadron at that time.

The unit was then rebranded in December 1982, to the designation of the 270th Engineering Installation Squadron with no change in mission or command. The 270th was relocated from Philadelphia International Airport to its current modern facilities at Willow Grove Air Reserve Station 15 Oct. 1985.

Finally in July 2005, the 270th EIS, along with the other 19 Air National Guard and active duty Engineering Installations Squadrons, transferred from Air Force Materiel Command (AFMC) to Air Combat Command (ACC).

At present, the 270th EIS now falls under the 24th Air Force and Air Force Space Command. When fully mobilized as a wartime asset, the unit is gained by the 253rd Combat Communications Group located at Otis Air National Guard Base, Mass. The 270th Engineering Installation Squadron typically performs thousands of hours of real world engineering and installation of command, control, communications, and computer systems annually for the US Air Force as an adjunct to training.

== Previous designations ==
- 603rd Signal Light Construction Company – 12 April 1949 – 1 October 1952
- 270th Communications Squadron, Operations – 1 October 1952 – October 1960
- 270th Ground Electronics Engineering Installation Agency (GEEIA) Squadron – October 1960 – May 1970
- 270th Electronics Installation Squadron – May 1970 – December 1982

== Bases stationed ==
- Philadelphia International Airport
- First Regiment Armory of the National Guard, Philadelphia, Pennsylvania
- Fort Mifflin, Philadelphia, Pennsylvania
- Willow Grove Air Reserve Station, Willow Grove, Pennsylvania
- Biddle Air National Guard Base, Pennsylvania, United States of America.
