= 193rd Special Operations Squadron =

Pennsylvania Air National Guard unit

193rd Special Operations Squadron

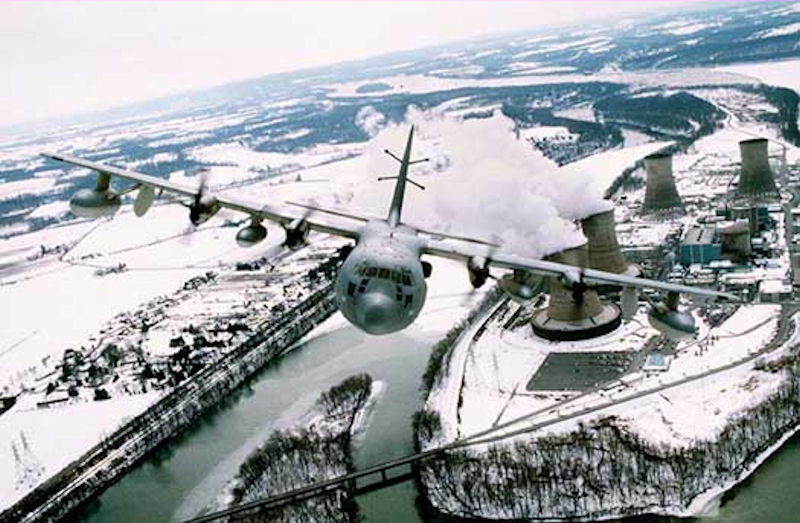
- A 193rd Special Operations Squadron EC-130E over Three Mile Island
- Active: 1967–present
- Country: United States
- Allegiance: Pennsylvania
- Branch: Air National Guard
- Type: Squadron
- Role: Special operations
- Part of: Pennsylvania Air National Guard
- Garrison/HQ: Harrisburg Air National Guard Base, Pennsylvania,
- Mottos: "Never Seen, Always Heard"

Insignia
- 193rd Special Operations Squadron emblem

The 193rd Special Operations Squadron is a unit of the Pennsylvania Air National Guard 193rd Special Operations Wing located at Harrisburg Air National Guard Base, Pennsylvania, The 193rd is equipped with the MC-130J Commando II.

== Mission ==
Flying the EC-130J Commando Solo, a specially-modified four-engine Hercules transport, the 193rd Special Operations Squadron conducts information operations, psychological operations and civil affairs broadcasts in AM, FM, HF, TV and military communications bands. A typical mission consists of a single-ship orbit offset from the desired target audience – either military or civilian personnel. The Air Force Special Operations Command's 193rd Special Operations Wing, Middletown, Pa., has total responsibility for the Commando Solo missions.

== History ==
The Pennsylvania Air National Guard's 140th Air Transport Squadron was operating Lockheed C-121 Constellations at Olmstead Air Force Base, Pennsylvania. However, threatened by the closure of Olmsted and by the downsizing of all conventionally powered transport aircraft, the National Guard Bureau volunteered the unit for a psychological warfare capability named "Coronet Solo." Following the Arab-Israeli War of June 1967, psychological warfare once again became a U.S. military priority. Tactical Air Command agreed and the 140th was inactivated and replaced by the 193rd Tactical Electronic Warfare Squadron. Four of its C-121s were converted to EC-121S Coronet Solos for its electronic warfare mission.

The mission later transitioned to the EC-130E (1980) and eventually to the EC-130J (2004). Soon after the 193rd received EC-130s, the Air National Guard unit participated in the rescue of American citizens in Operation Urgent Fury in 1983. Then known as Volant Solo, the aircraft acted as an airborne radio station, keeping the citizens of Grenada informed about the U.S. military action. Several years later in 1989, Volant Solo was instrumental in the success of coordinated psychological operations in Operation Just Cause. During this mission it broadcast throughout the initial phases of the operation, helping to end the Noriega regime.

In the mid-1980s, along with all other USAF special operations units, its mobilization gaining command became Twenty-Third Air Force of the Military Airlift Command. In 1990, the 193rd joined the newly formed Air Force Special Operations Command, and the wing's aircraft were redesignated Commando Solo, with no change in mission.

In 1990–91, Commando Solo was deployed to Saudi Arabia and Turkey in support of Operations Desert Shield and Operation Desert Storm. Its missions included broadcasting the "Voice of the Gulf" and other highly successful programs intended to convince Iraqi soldiers to surrender. In 1994, Commando Solo was used to broadcast radio and TV messages to the citizens and leaders of Haiti during Operation Uphold Democracy. President Jean-Bertrand Aristide was featured in these broadcasts, which contributed to the orderly transition from military rule to democracy.

Continuing its tradition, in 1997 the 193rd and Commando Solo supported the United Nations' Operation Joint Guard with radio and TV broadcasts over Bosnia-Herzegovina in support of stabilization forces operations. In 1998, the unit and its aircraft participated in Operation Desert Thunder, a deployment to Southwest Asia to convince Iraq to comply with U.N. Security Council resolutions. The Commando Solo was again sent into action in 1999 in support of Operation Allied Force. The aircraft was tasked to broadcast radio and television into Kosovo to prevent ethnic cleansing and assist in the expulsion of the Serbs from the region. In 2001, the Commando Solo aircraft broadcast messages to the local Afghan population and Taliban soldiers during Operation Enduring Freedom.

In 2003, the Commando Solo was deployed to the Middle East in support of Operation Iraqi Freedom. Most recently, the EC-130J was redeployed to the Middle East in support of the War on Terror.

On 17 September 2022, the last broadcast with an EC-130J was made during an airshow at Lancaster Airport, Pennsylvania. The 193rd Special Operations Wing is transitioning to the MC-130J Commando II over a period of 2 years.

== Lineage ==
- Constituted as the 193rd Tactical Electronic Warfare Squadron and allotted to the Air National Guard on 1 September 1967

Activated on 17 September 1967
Redesignated 193rd Electronic Combat Squadron on 6 October 1980
Redesignated 193rd Special Operations Squadron on 15 November 1983

=== Assignments ===
- 193d Tactical Electronic Warfare Group (later 193rd Electronic Combat Group, 193rd Special Operations Group), 17 September 1967
- 193rd Operations Group, 1 June 1995 – present

=== Stations ===
- Olmstead Air Force Base (later Harrisburg International Airport, Harrisburg Air National Guard Base), Pennsylvania, 17 September 1967 – present

=== Aircraft ===
- C-121 Constellation, 1967
- EC-121 Constellation 1967–1980
- EC-130E Commando Solo 1980–2004
- EC-130J Commando Solo 2004–2024
- MC-130J Commando II 2023-Current
