= Harrisburg Air National Guard Base =

United States Air Force base in Pennsylvania

Harrisburg Air National Guard Base
- Middletown, Pennsylvania in the United States of America
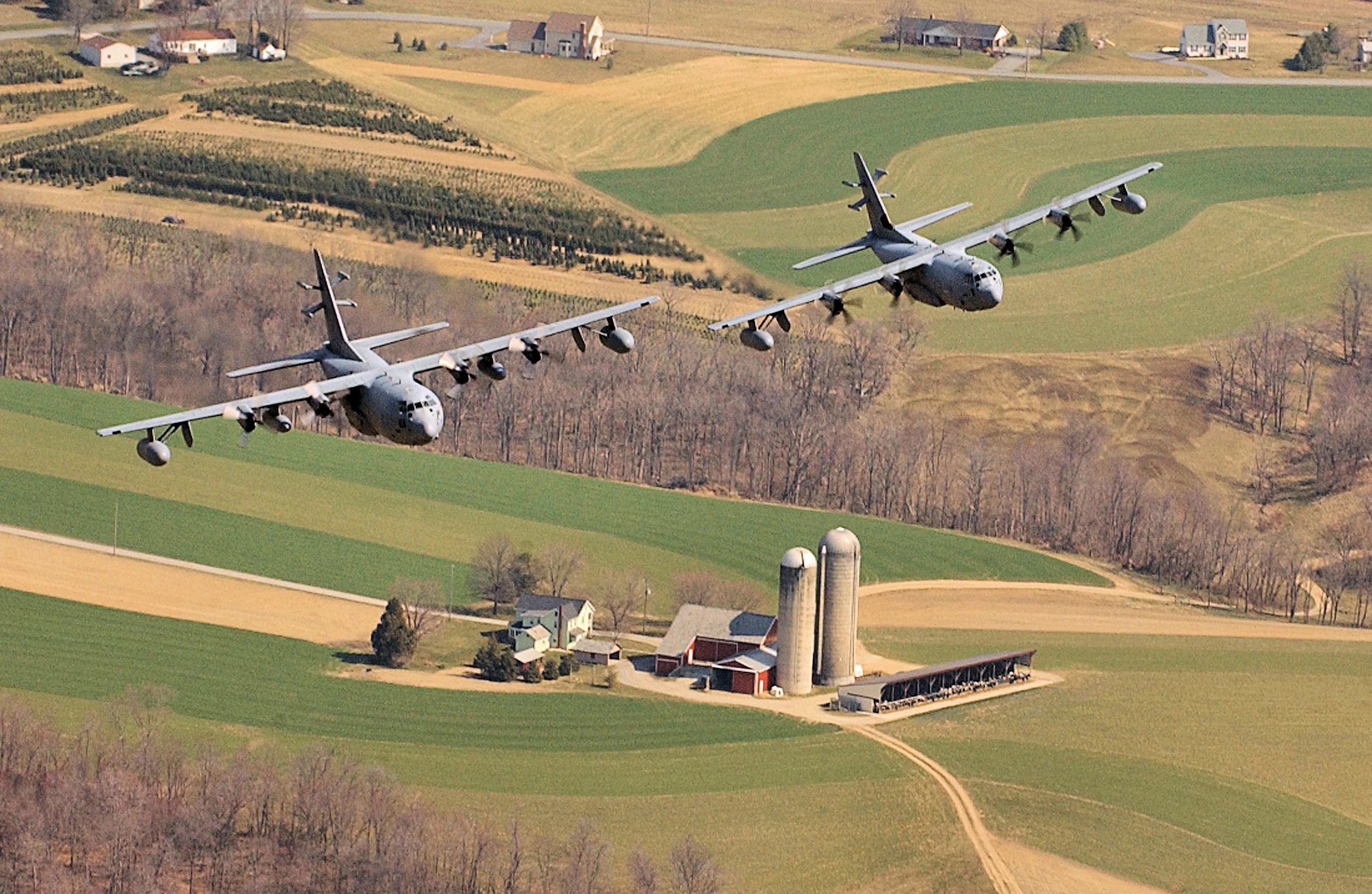
- An EC-130E Commando Solo and EC-130J Commando Solo of the 193rd Special Operations Wing over south central Pennsylvania in 2006.

Site information
- Type: Air National Guard Base
- Owner: Department of Defense
- Operator: US Air Force (USAF)
- Controlled by: Pennsylvania Air National Guard
- Condition: Operational
- Website: www.193sow.ang.af.mil

Location
- Location in the United States
- Coordinates: 40°11′37″N 076°45′48″W

Site history
- Built: 1917 (as Middletown Airfield)
- In use: 1917 – present

Garrison information
- Current commander: Colonel Terrence L. Koudelka, Jr.
- Garrison: 193d Special Operations Wing

Airfield information
- Identifiers: IATA: MDT, ICAO: KMDT, FAA LID: MDT, WMO: 725115
- Elevation: 94.4 metres (310 ft) AMSL
Runways
Direction	Length and surface
13/31	3,048.3 metres (10,001 ft) Asphalt
- Airfield shared with Harrisburg International Airport; Source: Federal Aviation Administration

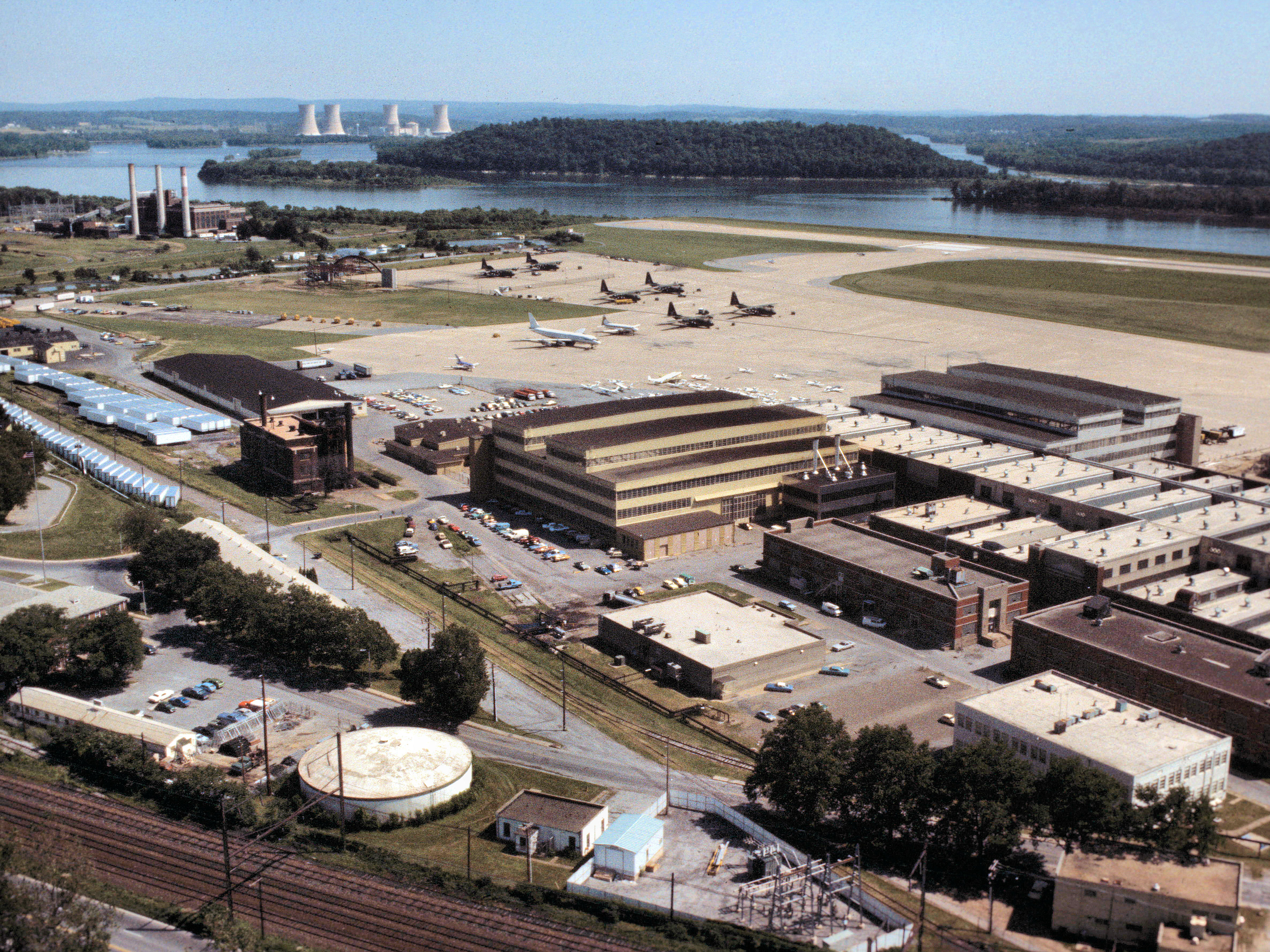
Olmsted Air National Guard Base – May 1979

Harrisburg Air National Guard Base is a United States Air Force base, located at Harrisburg International Airport, (IATA: MDT, ICAO: KMDT, FAA LID: MDT) Pennsylvania. It is located 1.7 miles (2.7 km) west-southwest of Middletown, Pennsylvania.

The Pennsylvania Air National Guard facility is sited on the location of the former Olmsted Air Force Base, which was closed in 1969. The 193d Special Operations Wing operates Lockheed Martin MC-130J Commando Solo II aircraft. Today the airfield is split between civilian activities, Harrisburg IAP (MDT) and military activities, which now carry the Harrisburg ANGB title. After Olmsted AFB closed in 1970 major civilian air activities moved from Capital City Airport, near Harrisburg over to the former Olmsted site.

== Middletown Air Depot ==
The installation saw its first military use by the United States Army Signal Corps in 1898. The first known use of the field by military aircraft was when Middletown Airfield opened in 1917 as a supply depot and maintenance center for Signal Corps aircraft.

The first airplanes landed in 1918 at Middletown Air Depot, when it was under the administration of the Signal Corps of the United States Army. In 1939, it was still known by this name. Middletown had an abundance of engine and airframe shops and a supply distribution system that made it a significant facility, but a poor runway that, it was felt, would be too expensive to improve. It would involve claiming marsh land and portions of the Susquehanna River (both of which have since been accomplished) and the Air Force leadership at that time determined that more land for supply and maintenance buildings was needed.

After World War I and the reconstitution of the United States Army Air Service in 1922, the facility became a logistics and maintenance support of Air Service aircraft and equipment through its host unit, the Middletown Air Depot (later Middletown Air Materiel Area under the U.S. Army Air Corps). During World War II, numerous U.S. Army Air Forces transport and reconnaissance units were organized and formed at Olmsted Army Airfield. Once equipped, they were reassigned to training bases. The Middletown Air Depot-cum-Middletown Air Material Area was a major support installation to the U.S. Air Force and its predecessor organizations for decades.

== Renaming for Robert Olmsted ==
The installation was renamed in honor of 1st Lieutenant Robert Sanford Olmsted, U.S. Army Air Service, on 11 March 1948. First Lieutenant Olmsted was killed in a ballooning accident over the village of Loosbroek, Netherlands on 23 September 1923 while competing in the Gordon Bennett Cup. Olmsted remained in the race despite threatening weather which caused some competitors to drop out. Lightning struck the S-6 over Nistelrode, the Netherlands, killing Olmsted.

Beginning on 11 August 1948, the 147th Flight Service Squadron of the Military Air Transport Service (MATS) began operations of the Olmsted Flight Service Center.

During the 1948–1949 Berlin Airlift, the U.S. Supply Depot at Olmsted AFB provided emergency support supplies for the airlift operations.

In 1958, Olmsted was designated as prime support depot for the T-38 Talon advanced jet trainer then under development and the L-27, later designated the U-3 Blue Canoe, support aircraft.

Olmsted AFB and the Middletown Air Depot's last assignment was with Air Force Logistics Command (AFLC), and the base and depot were closed on 30 June 1969.

== Closure of Olmsted AFB ==
Initially turned over to Pennsylvania Air National Guard after active-duty closure, much of the former Olmsted AFB flight line area was redeveloped into the Harrisburg International Airport under the ownership of the Commonwealth of Pennsylvania.

In 1998, the Commonwealth of Pennsylvania transferred ownership of the airport to the Susquehanna Area Regional Airport Authority (SARAA). In addition, in 1966, much of the former Air Force property was converted into The Pennsylvania State University—The Capital College, otherwise known as the Penn State Harrisburg Campus. This campus was originally chartered as a graduate and upper division school.

== Major commands to which assigned ==
- Army Signal Corps, Aviation Section, 16 June 1917
- Bureau of Aircraft Production, 20 May 1918
- Army Air Service, 4 June 1920
- Air Corps Materiel Division, 15 October 1926
- Air Corps Maintenance Command, 29 April 1941
- Air Service Command, 17 October 1941
- Army Air Forces Materiel and Services on July 14, 1944

Redesignated: Army Air Forces Technical Service Command on August 31, 1944
Redesignated: Air Technical Service Command on July 1, 1945
Redesignated: Air Materiel Command on March 9, 1946
Redesignated: Air Force Logistics Command on April 1, 1961
Inactivated on 30 June 1969

== Known units assigned ==
Known base operating units were:

- 4149th Air Base Unit
- 2843d Air Base Wing
- 4112th Air Force Base Unit

Known major service units:

- Middletown Air Service Command, later Middletown Air Materiel Area

Known operational units assigned were:

- Eleventh Air Force (Air Defense Command), 13 June 1946 – 1 July 1948
- 60th Transport Group, 1 December 1940 – 21 May 1941
- 61st Transport Group, 1 December 1940 – 9 July 1941
- 315th Transport Group, 14 February 1942 – 18 June 1942
- 168th Air Transport Group, 16 February 1964 - 8 January 1966
- 168th Military Airlift Group, 8 January 1966 - 1 Jun 1967
- 168th Tactical Electronic Warfare Group, 8 January 1966 - 6 October 1980 (PA ANG unit that remained post-closure; current 193rd Special Operations Wing)

- 6th Transport Squadron, 14 October 1939 – 23 March 1942
- 10th Transport Squadron, 1 December 1940 – 21 May 1941
- 12th Transport Squadron, 1 December 1940 – 20 May 1941
- 2d Transport Squadron, 28 June 1935 – 21 May 1942
- 33d Transport Squadron, 14 February 1942 – 17 June 1942
- 43d Transport Squadron, 15 June 1942 – 17 June 1942
- 34th Transport Squadron, 14 February 1942 – 18 June 1942
- 35th Transport Squadron, 14 February 1942 – 18 June 1942
- 64th Troop Carrier Squadron, 5 April 1947 – 27 June 1949
- 113th Aero Squadron, 15 September 1917 – 31 March 1919

Assigned to: Pennsylvania National Guard

== Role and operations ==
The PA ANG's 193d Special Operations Wing consists of:

- 193d Special Operations Squadron flies the Lockheed Martin MC-130J Commando II, a multirole aircraft. The squadron previously flew the EC-130J Commando Solo, a specially-modified four-engine Hercules transport. The 193d Special Operations Squadron conducted information operations, psychological operations and civil affairs broadcasts.

Other components of the Wing are located at State College and at Muir Army Airfield at Fort Indiantown Gap.

== Based units ==
Flying and notable non-flying units based at Harrisburg Field Air National Guard Base.

=== United States Air Force ===
Air National Guard

- Pennsylvania Air National Guard
  - 193rd Special Operations Wing
    - Headquarters 193rd Special Operations Wing
    - 193rd Special Operations Group
      - 193rd Special Operations Squadron – MC-130J Commando II
      - 193rd Special Operations Support Squadron
    - 193rd Special Operations Maintenance Group
      - 193rd Special Operations Aircraft Maintenance Squadron
      - 193rd Special Operations Maintenance Operations Flight
      - 193rd Special Operations Maintenance Squadron
    - 193rd Special Operations Mission Support Group
      - 193rd Special Operations Civil Engineering Squadron
      - 193rd Special Operations Communications Squadron
      - 193rd Special Operations Force Support Squadron
      - 193rd Special Operations Logistics Readiness Squadron
      - 193rd Special Operations Security Forces Squadron
    - 193rd Special Operations Medical Group
      - Detachment 1
    - 193rd Air Operations Group
      - 93rd Air Intelligence Squadron
      - 193rd Air Communications Squadron
      - 193rd Combat Operations Squadron

== See also ==
- Pennsylvania World War II Army Airfields
