= Lockheed EC-130 =

1975 electronic warfare aircraft series by Lockheed

EC-130
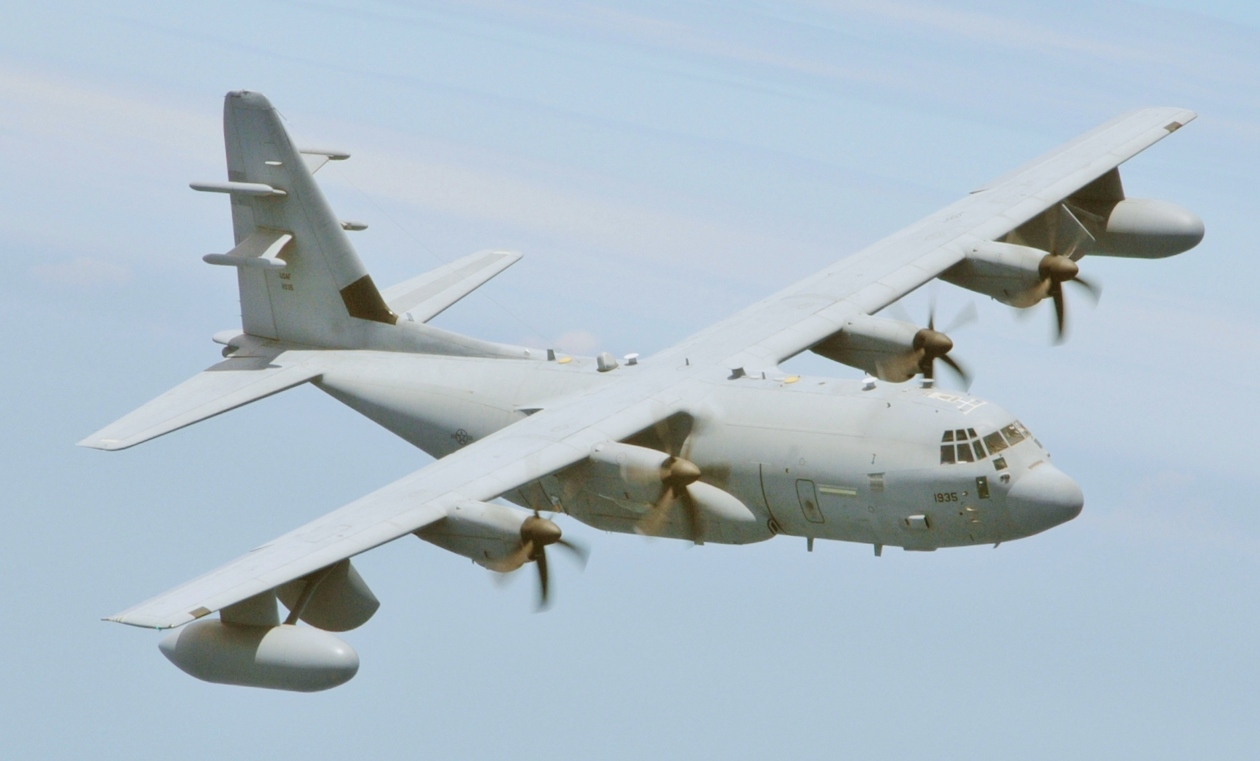
- The EC-130J Commando Solo with its distinctive tail antenna.

General information
- Type: Airborne Communications Jamming (EC-130H); Psychological and Information Operations (EC-130J); Airborne Command and Communications post TACAMO (EC-130Q)
- Manufacturer: Lockheed Aircraft Co. Lockheed Martin
- Status: Retired
- Primary user: United States Air Force
- Number built: 14 EC-130H; 7 EC-130J

History
- Introduction date: 1975
- Developed from: Lockheed C-130 Hercules; Lockheed Martin C-130J Super Hercules
- Variant: Lockheed EC-130H Compass Call
- Developed into: Lockheed Martin E-130J

The Lockheed EC-130 series comprises several slightly different versions of the Lockheed C-130 Hercules that have been operated by the U.S. Air Force until 2026 and, until the 1990s, the U.S. Navy.

The EC-130E Airborne Battlefield Command and Control Center (ABCCC) was based on a basic C-130E platform and provided tactical airborne command post capabilities to air commanders and ground commanders in low air threat environments. The EC-130E ABCCC aircraft were retired in 2002 and the mission was 'migrated' to the E-8 JSTARS and E-3 AWACS fleets.

The EC-130E Commando Solo was an earlier version of a U.S. Air Force and Air National Guard psychological operations (PSYOPS) aircraft and this aircraft also employed a C-130E airframe, but was modified by using the mission electronic equipment from the retired EC-121S Coronet Solo aircraft. This airframe served during the first Gulf War (Operation Desert Storm), Operation Uphold Democracy, the second Gulf War (Operation Iraqi Freedom) and in Operation Enduring Freedom. The EC-130E was eventually replaced by the EC-130J Commando Solo and retired in 2006.

Based on a C-130H airframe, the EC-130H Compass Call was an airborne communications jamming platform operated by the Air Combat Command's (ACC) 55th Electronic Combat Group (55 ECG) at Davis-Monthan AFB, Tucson, Arizona. The EC-130 Compass Call aircraft attempts to disrupt enemy command and control communications and limits adversary coordination essential for enemy force management. The Compass Call system employs offensive counterinformation and electronic attack capabilities in support of U.S. and Coalition tactical air, surface, and special operations forces. The EC-130H was used extensively in the Gulf War and Operation Iraqi Freedom, disrupting Iraqi communications at both the strategic and tactical levels. It has also been used in Operation Enduring Freedom in Afghanistan and Operation Inherent Resolve against the Islamic State.

The EC-130J Commando Solo was a modified C-130J Super Hercules used to conduct psychological operations (PSYOP) and civil affairs broadcast missions in the standard AM, FM, HF, TV and military communications bands. Missions are flown at the maximum altitudes possible to provide optimum propagation patterns. The EC-130J flies during either day or night scenarios with equal success, and is air-refuelable. A typical mission consists of a single-ship orbit which is offset from the desired target audience. The targets may be either military or civilian personnel. The Commando Solo is operated exclusively by the Air National Guard, specifically the 193rd Special Operations Wing (193 SOW), a unit of the Pennsylvania Air National Guard operationally gained by the Air Force Special Operations Command (AFSOC). The 193 SOW is based at the Harrisburg Air National Guard Base (former Olmstead AFB) at Harrisburg International Airport in Middletown, Pennsylvania.

The U.S. Navy's EC-130Q Hercules TACAMO ("Take Charge And Move Out") aircraft was a land-based naval aviation platform that served as a SIOP strategic communications link aircraft for the U.S. Navy's Fleet Ballistic Missile (FBM) submarine force and as a backup communications link for the USAF crewed strategic bomber and intercontinental ballistic missile forces. To ensure survivability, TACAMO operated as a solo platform, well away from and not interacting with other major naval forces such as sea-based aircraft carrier strike groups and their carrier air wings or land-based maritime patrol aircraft. Operated by Fleet Air Reconnaissance Squadron THREE (VQ-3) and Fleet Air Reconnaissance Squadron FOUR (VQ-4), the EC-130Q was replaced by the U.S. Navy's current TACAMO platform, the Boeing 707-based E-6 Mercury.

in December 2020 (Fiscal Year 2021), the US Navy announced that it awarded a contract to Lockheed Martin for the purchase the C-130J-30 Hercules as testbed for the TACAMO mission The aircraft selection represents a return to the C-130 platform by the Navy, which for years used the EC-130Q (an older variant despite the higher letter) for the TACAMO mission from 1963 until 1993.

In October 2024, the US Navy announced that the new C-130J-30-based TACAMO mission aircraft will be designated E-130J. It will replace the currently operational E-6 Mercury in the near future.

== Design and development ==
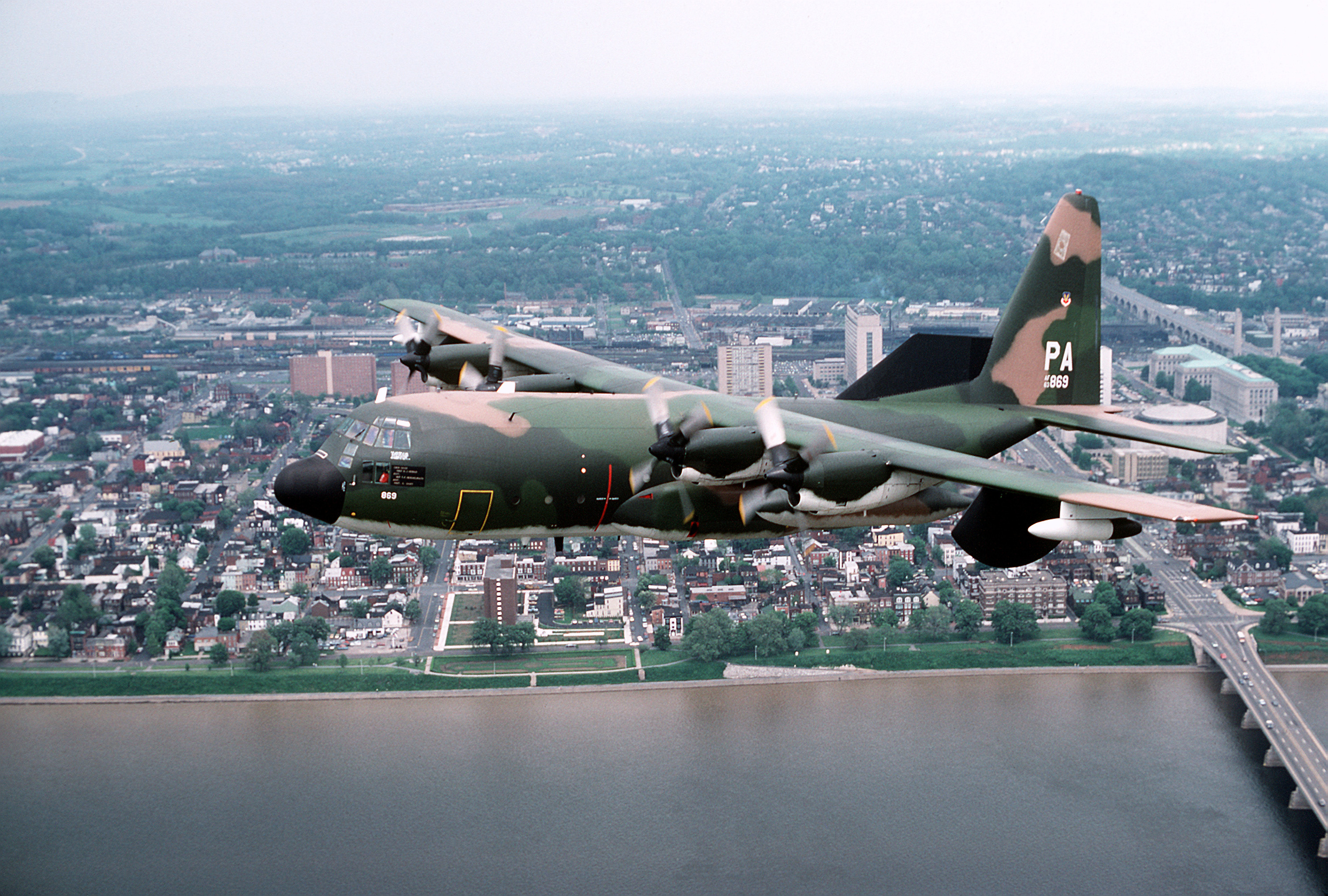
A Pennsylvania ANG EC-130E in 1980.

The EC-130E Commando Solo entered service in 1978 as the EC-130E Coronet Solo with the Tactical Air Command (TAC). In 1983 the Coronet Solo's mission was transferred to the Military Airlift Command (MAC) and redesignated the EC-130E Volant Solo. With the formation of Air Force Special Operations Command, the mission was transferred to AFSOC and redesignated Commando Solo. Operations were consolidated under a single-AFSOC gained unit, the 193d Special Operations Wing (193 SOW) of the Pennsylvania Air National Guard. In the early 1990s the aircraft were upgraded and designated Commando Solo II. The EC-130E variants were replaced with new EC-130J Commando Solo III aircraft built by Lockheed Martin beginning in 2003.

Highly specialized modifications have been made to the latest version of the EC-130J (Commando Solo III). Included in these mods are enhanced navigation systems, self-protection equipment, and the capability of broadcasting color television on a multitude of worldwide standards throughout the TV VHF/UHF ranges.

Secondary missions include command and control communications countermeasures (C3CM) and limited intelligence gathering. The three variants are EC-130 ABCCC, EC-130E Commando Solo, and the EC-130J Commando Solo. The version currently in service is the EC-130J, as the last EC-130E was retired from service in 2006.

The USAF plans to begin replacing the 15 EC-130H Compass Call aircraft in 2020 with a commercial airframe transplanted with the Compass Call's electronic gear. In September 2017, the Air Force announced that L3 Technologies will serve as the lead systems integrator for a future Compass Call aircraft based on the Gulfstream G550 business jet. The new Compass Call platform was designated as EA-37B by Air Combat Command on November 14, 2023.

== Operational history ==
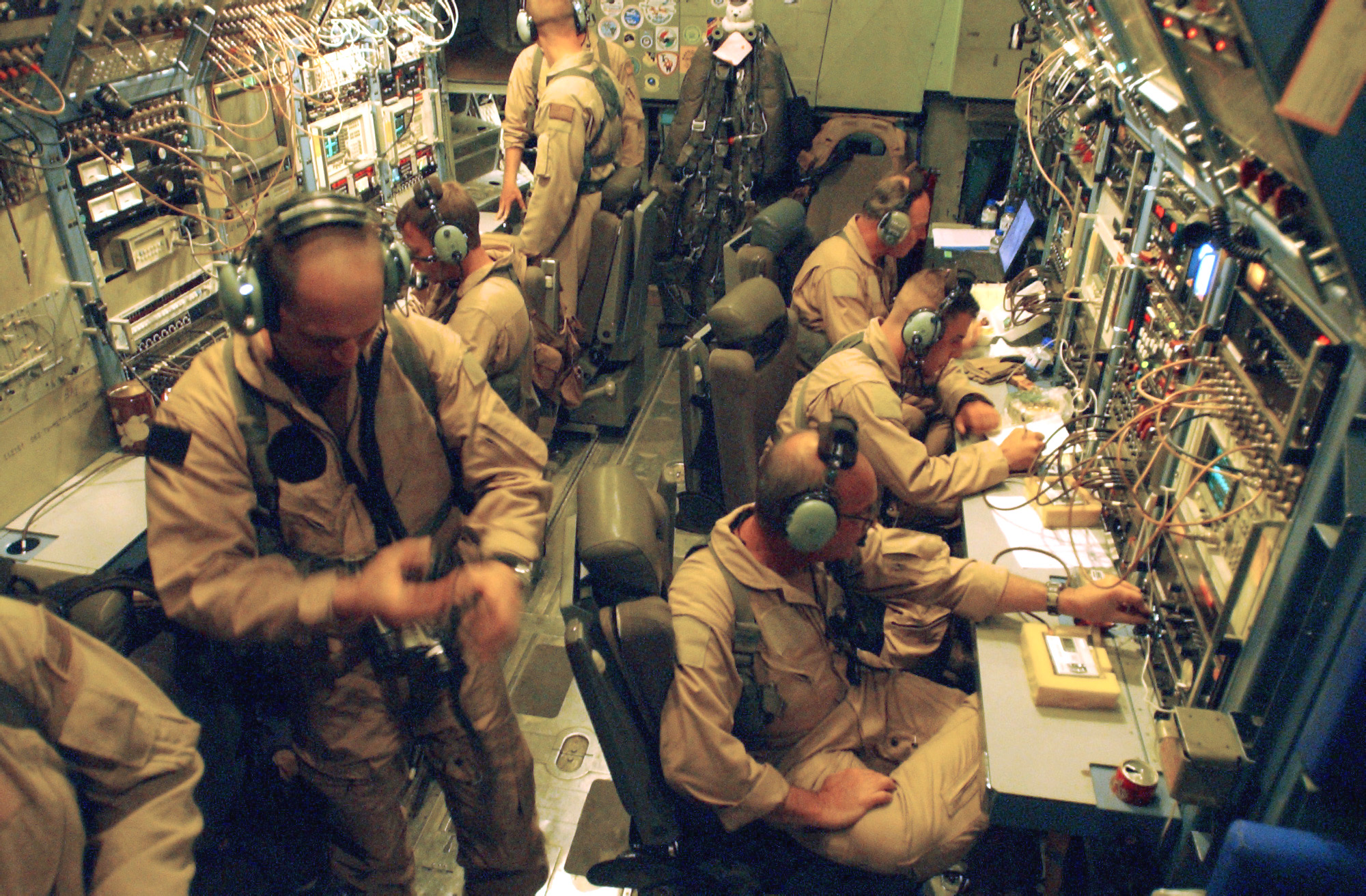
U.S. Military personnel assigned to the 4th Psychological Operations Group, 193d Special Operations Wing, Pennsylvania Air National Guard broadcast television and radio programming from on board an EC-130E aircraft, in support of Operation Iraqi Freedom.

Entering service with the Tactical Air Command (TAC), the EC-130E Commando Solo was originally modified by using the mission electronic equipment from the EC-121S Coronet Solo. Soon after the then-193rd Special Operations Group received its EC-130s, the unit participated in the rescue of US citizens in Operation Urgent Fury, acting as an airborne radio station informing those people on Grenada of the US military action. In 1989, the EC-130 Commando Solo was instrumental in the success of coordinated psychological operations in Operation Just Cause, again broadcasting continuously throughout the initial phases of the operation to help end the Manuel Noriega regime. In 1990, the EC-130E joined the newly formed Air Force Special Operations Command (AFSOC) and has since been designated Commando Solo, with no change in mission.

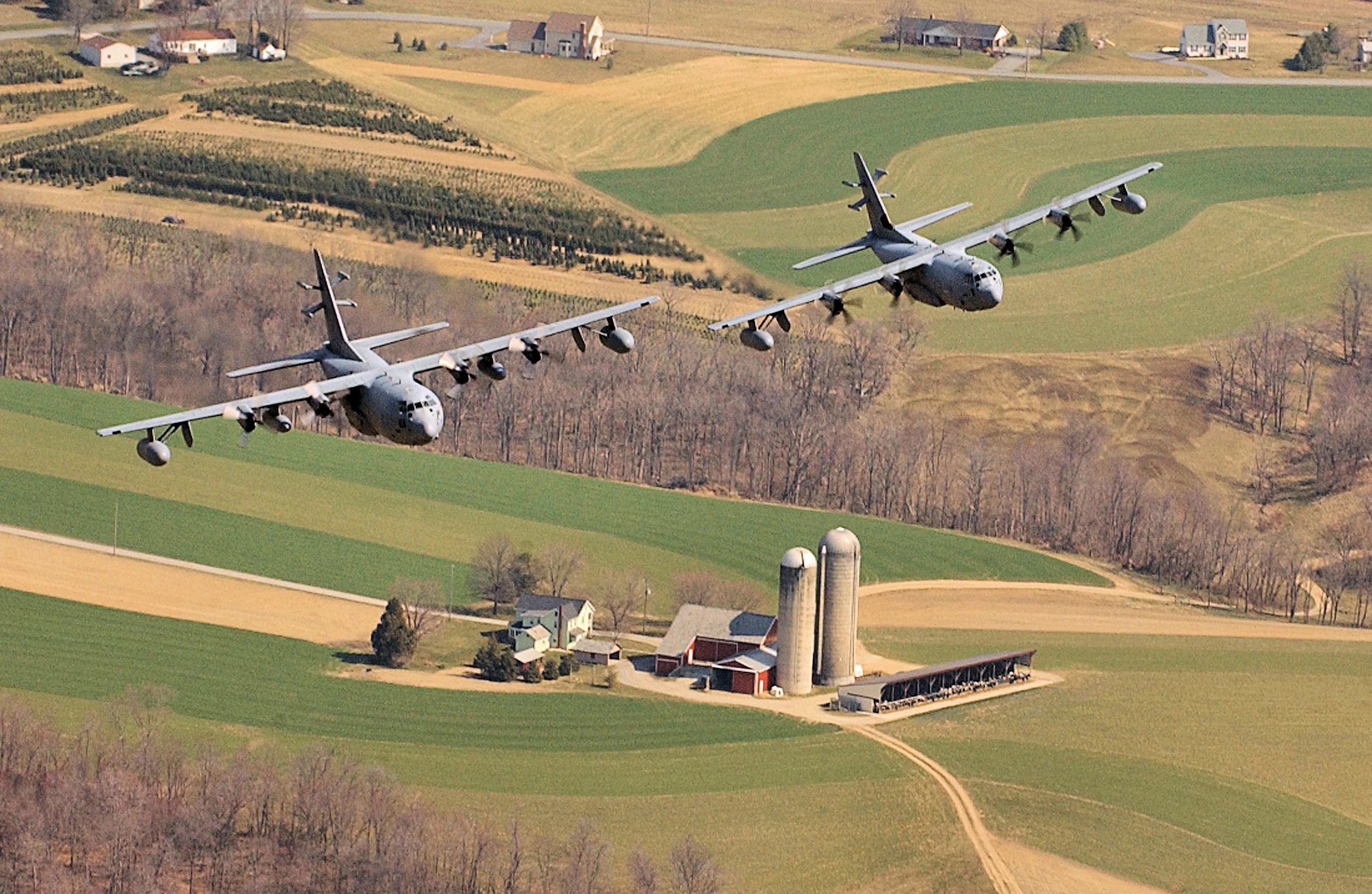
An EC-130E Commando Solo and EC-130J Commando Solo of the 193rd Special Operations Wing from Harrisburg Air National Guard Base.

More recently, in 1994, the EC-130E Commando Solo was used to broadcast radio and television messages to the citizens and leaders of Haiti during Operation Uphold Democracy. The EC-130s deployed early in the operation, highlighting the importance of PSYOP in avoiding military and civilian casualties. President Aristide was featured on the broadcasts which contributed significantly to the orderly transition from military rule to democracy.

The aircraft was also deployed during the 2010 Haiti earthquake, broadcasting a recording from Raymond Joseph (Haiti's ambassador to the United States) warning residents not to attempt to flee to the United States by sea. The aircraft also broadcast announcements of where earthquake victims can go for food and aid, news from Voice of America, and instructions on hygiene procedures to prevent disease.

On the second day of Operation Odyssey Dawn, an EC-130J warned Libyan shipping "Libyan ships or vessels do not leave port, the Gaddafi regime forces are violating a United Nations resolution ordering the end to the hostilities in your country. If you attempt to leave port, you will be attacked and destroyed immediately. For your own safety do not leave port." The unencrypted message in Arabic, French and English was recorded by a ham radio operator in the Netherlands.

The EC-130 has been flown in operations against the Islamic State in Iraq to jam their communications.

== Variants ==
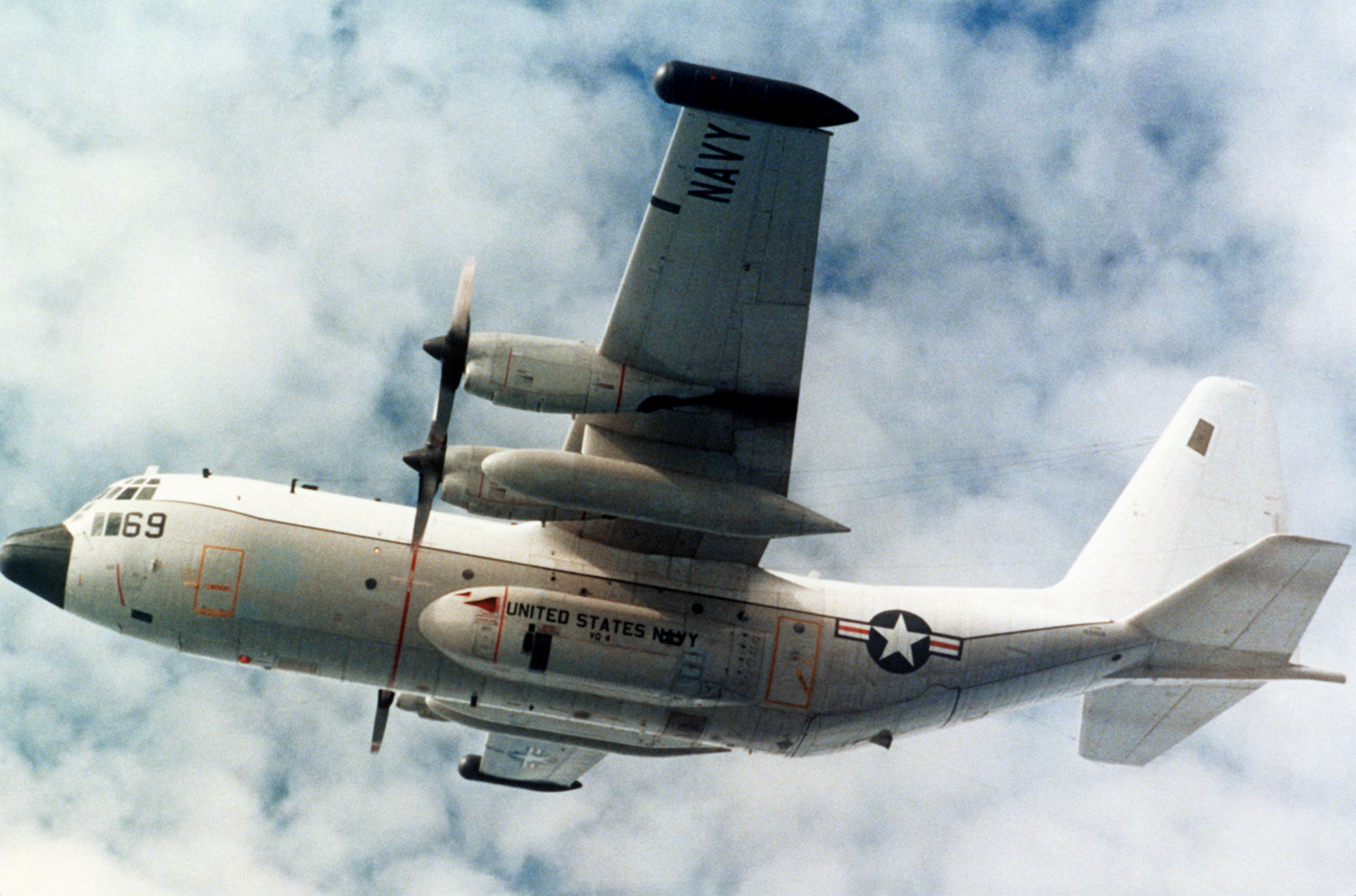
A U.S. Navy TACAMO EC-130Q of VQ-4, in 1984.

EC-130E ABCCC
Airborne Battlefield Command and Control Center variant. Retired in 2002. Operated by the 7th Airborne Command and Control Squadron, later by the 42nd Airborne Command and Control Squadron.
EC-130E Commando Solo
Operated in the airborne radio and television broadcast mission from 1980. Replaced by EC-130J Commando Solo III aircraft in 2004.
EC-130E Rivet Rider
A version of the Commando Solo. Modifications include: VHF and UHF Worldwide format color TV, vertical trailing wire antenna, infra-red countermeasures [chaff/flare dispensers plus infrared jammers], fire suppressant foam in fuel tank, radar warning receiver, self-contained navigation system. The modification added a pair of underwing pylon mounted 23X6 foot equipment pods, along with X-antennae mounted on both sides of the vertical fin.
EC-130G
four U.S. Navy C-130G (USAF C-130E) fitted with VLF transmitters to provide communications with ballistic missile submarines. Operational from December 1963 to August 1993

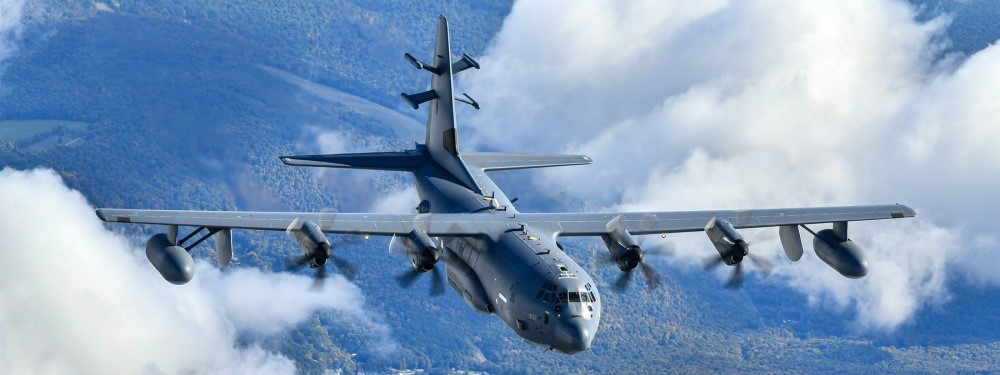
EC-130J Commando Solo from the 193rd Special Operations Squadron takes flight from Harrisburg Air National Guard Base

EC-130H Compass Call
Electronic Warfare variant. Its system disrupts enemy command and control communications. Employs offensive counterinformation and electronic attack capabilities. Used by the 55th Electronic Combat Group, Davis-Monthan Air Force Base. Retired in 2026.
EC-130J Commando Solo III
A modified C-130J Hercules used to conduct psychological operations (PSYOP) and civil affairs broadcast missions in the standard AM, FM, HF, TV, and military communications bands. Operated by the 193rd Special Operations Wing, Pennsylvania Air National Guard. The EC-130J Commando Solo is a modified C-130J used for broadcast and psyops, while the EC-130J Super J is a modified C-130J used for special operations forces mobility and psyops. Operational from 2003 to Sept. 17, 2022 As part of AFSOC's multimission fleet consolidation the MC-130J Commando II is replacing both Commando Solo and Super-J.
EC-130Q
U.S. Navy version of the C-130H, fitted with VLF transmitters to provide communications with ballistic missile submarines. 18 were built. Operational from December 1963 to August 1993
EC-130V
Airborne early warning and control variant used by USCG for counter-narcotics missions in 1991. It was used by the U.S. Navy 1992–1994 and then by the USAF as NC-130H.

== Aircraft on display ==
EC-130Q USN BuNo 159348, c/n 4601
TACAMO IV, ops with VQ-4, July 1975 – July 1988; modified to TC-130Q, ops with VR-22, VXE-6; to Tinker AFB with VQ-3, VQ-4, "hack" aircraft as of December 1995. On static display at Naval Air Facility, Tinker AFB, Oklahoma by March 1997, same, July 2013.
EC-130E USAF Ser. No. 62-1857
Operation Eagle Claw Republic 5 aircraft. On static display at the Carolinas Aviation Museum October 2013.
EC-130E USAF Ser. No. 63-7773 "Triple Cripple"
On static display at Fort Indiantown Gap, Annville PA.

== Specifications (EC-130J) ==
EC-130J Commando Solo III line drawing

Data from Jane's All the World's Aircraft 2010–11, US Air Force Factsheet

General characteristics

- Crew: 6+ (Pilot, CoPilot, combat systems officer, mission communications commander; loadmaster, five electronic communications systems operators)
- Length: 97 ft 9 in (29.79 m)
- Wingspan: 132 ft 7.2 in (40.416 m)
- Height: 38 ft 10 in (11.84 m)
- Wing area: 1,745 sq ft (162.1 m^{2})
- Aspect ratio: 10.1
- Airfoil: root: NACA 64A318; tip: NACA 64A412
- Max takeoff weight: 175,000 lb (79,379 kg)
- Max landing weight (normal): 130,000 lb (58,967 kg)
- Max landing weight (overload): 155,000 lb (70,307 kg)
- Fuel capacity: 6,750 US gal (5,620 imp gal; 25,600 L) without suppressant foam; 6,436 US gal (5,359 imp gal; 24,360 L) with suppressant foam

optionally with 2x 13,790 US gal (11,480 imp gal; 52,200 L) under-wing tanks without suppressant foam; 2x 1,290 US gal (1,070 imp gal; 4,900 L) under-wing tanks with suppressant foam

- Powerplant: 4 × Rolls-Royce AE 2100D3 turboprop engines, 4,591 shp (3,424 kW) each (de-rated from 4,637 shp (3,458 kW) at 25 °C (77 °F)
- Propellers: 6-bladed Dowty Propellers R391, 13 ft 6 in (4.11 m) diameter constant-speed fully-feathering reversible composite propellers

Performance

- Cruise speed: 348 kn (400 mph, 644 km/h) max. at 28,000 ft (8,534 m)

339 kn (390 mph; 628 km/h) econ.

- Stall speed: 100 kn (120 mph, 190 km/h)
- Range: 2,300 nmi (2,600 mi, 4,300 km)
- Service ceiling: 30,560 ft (9,310 m) at 147,000 lb (66,678 kg)
- Service ceiling one engine inoperative: 22,820 ft (6,956 m)
- Rate of climb: 2,100 ft/min (11 m/s)
- Time to altitude: 20,000 ft (6,096 m) in 14 minutes
- Take-off run: 3,050 ft (930 m)
- Take-off distance to 50 ft (15 m): 4,700 ft (1,433 m)
- Take-off run (maximum effort): 1,800 ft (549 m)
- Landing run: 1,400 ft (427 m) at 130,000 lb (58,967 kg)
- Landing distance from 50 ft (15 m): 2,550 ft (777 m) at 130,000 lb (58,967 kg)

== See also ==
Related development

- Lockheed C-130 Hercules
- Lockheed Martin C-130J Super Hercules
- Lockheed AC-130
- Lockheed EC-130H Compass Call
- Lockheed HC-130
- Lockheed MC-130
- Lockheed WC-130

Related lists

- List of accidents and incidents involving the Lockheed C-130 Hercules
- List of active United States military aircraft
