= 193rd Special Operations Wing =

Pennsylvania Air National Guard unit

193rd Special Operations Wing

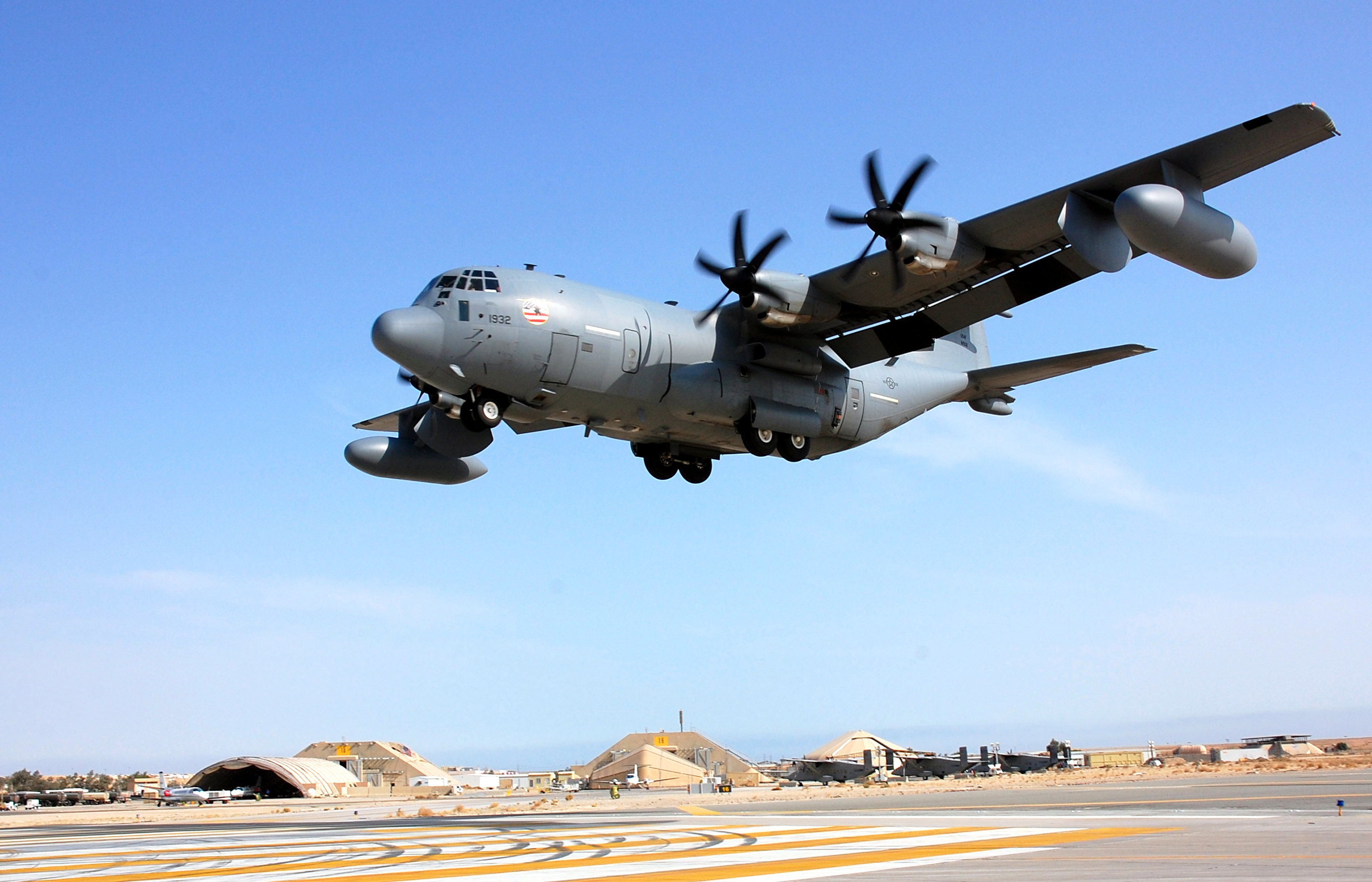
- 193rd Special Operations Squadron EC-130J Commando Solo aircraft prepares to land at an air base in Southwest Asia.
- Active: 1967–present
- Country: United States
- Allegiance: Pennsylvania
- Branch: Air National Guard
- Type: Wing
- Role: Psychological warfare
- Part of: Pennsylvania Air National Guard
- Garrison/HQ: Harrisburg Air National Guard Base, Pennsylvania
- Mottos: "Never Seen, Always Heard"

Commanders
- Wing Commander: Colonel Robert S. Noren

Insignia
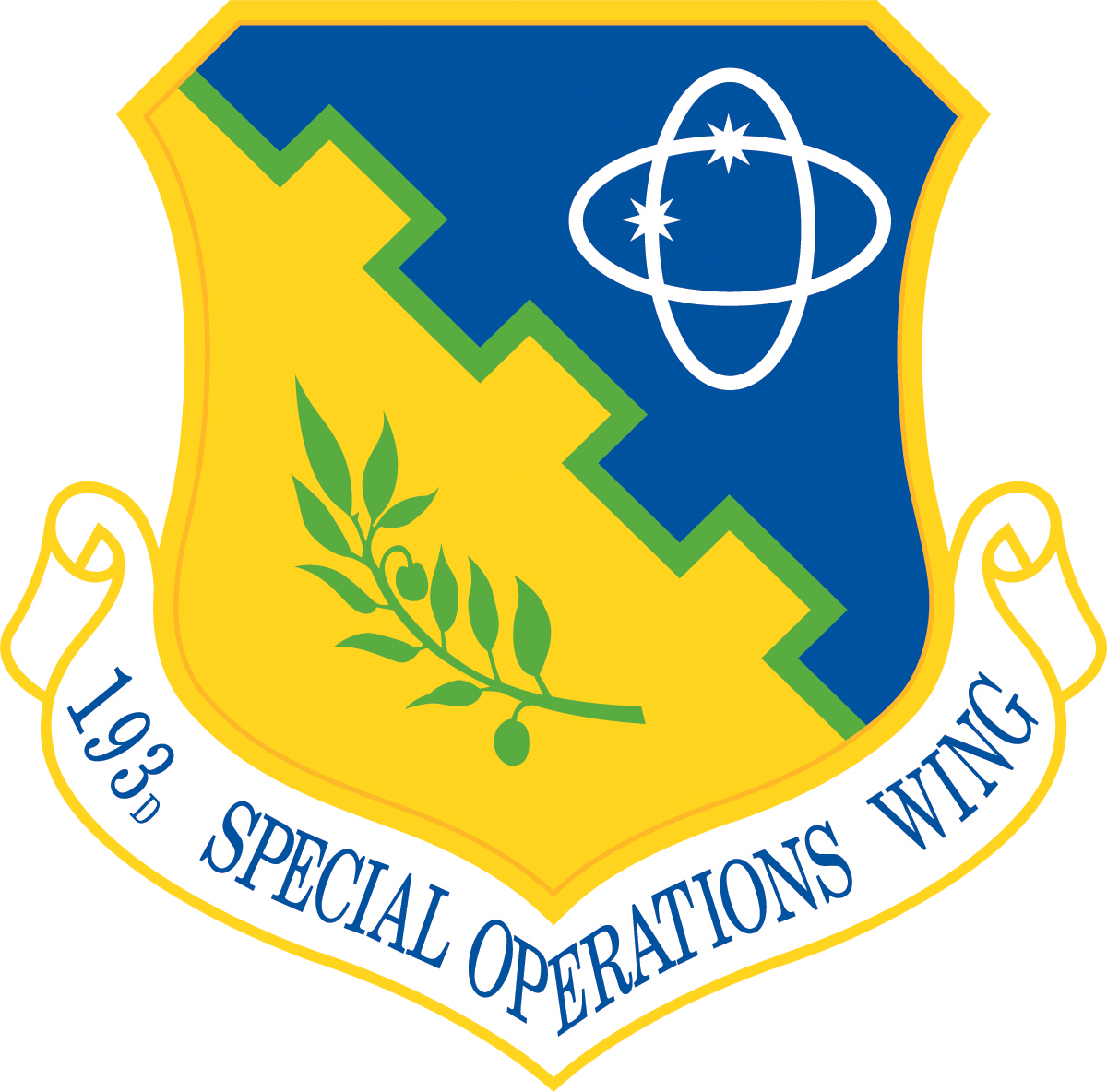
- 193rd Special Operations Wing emblem

Aircraft flown
- MC-130J

The 193rd Special Operations Wing is a unit of the Pennsylvania Air National Guard, stationed at Harrisburg Air National Guard Base, Middletown, Pennsylvania. The wing is gained by the Commonwealth of Pennsylvania when in a "state" status, as well as by the United States Air Force and Air Force Special Operations Command in its Federal capacity as part of the Air National Guard. The wing was organized as a group, the 193rd Tactical Electronic Warfare Group. Although it has never been mobilized as a unit, most of its equipment and personnel have been individually called up to serve in Southeast Asia and in Desert Storm.

== Mission ==
The 193rd's primary wartime and contingency operations mission is to broadcast radio and television signals to target populations from an airborne transmitter, jamming existing television and radio signals where necessary. Messages are not developed within the wing itself, but are provided by staff of the United States Army's 4th Psychological Operations Group (Airborne), based at Fort Bragg, North Carolina.

== Units ==
- 193rd Special Operations Wing
  - 193rd Special Operations Group
    - 193rd Special Operations Squadron
    - 193rd Special Operations Support Squadron
  - 193rd Special Operations Maintenance Group
    - 193rd Special Operations Maintenance Squadron
    - 193rd Special Operations Aircraft Maintenance Squadron
    - 193rd Special Operations Maintenance Operations Flight
  - 193rd Special Operations Mission Support Group
    - 193rd Special Operations Security Forces Squadron
    - 193rd Special Operations Civil Engineering Squadron
    - 193rd Special Operations Communications Squadron
    - 193rd Special Operations Logistics Readiness Squadron
    - 193rd Special Operations Force Support Squadron
  - 193rd Special Operations Medical Group
  - 193rd Air Operations Group (Note: This group and its components are not gained by Air Force Special Operations Command.)
    - 193rd Air Intelligence Squadron
    - 193rd Combat Operations Squadron
    - 193rd Air Communications Squadron
  - 193rd Regional Support Group (Note: This group and its components are not gained by Air Force Special Operations Command.)
    - 148th Air Support Operations Squadron
    - 201st RED HORSE Squadron
    - 211th Engineering Installation Squadron
    - 271st Combat Communications Squadron
    - 203rd Weather Flight

== History ==
=== Background ===
The Pennsylvania Air National Guard 168th Military Airlift Group operated Lockheed C-121 Constellations from Olmsted Air Force Base. Following Operation Power Pack, the United States military intervention during the 1965 crisis in the Dominican Republic, (Note: The 193rd's web page attributes this interest to the 1967 Arab-Israeli conflict, but the program predates that war. van Geffan, p. 6.) Robert McNamara, the United States Secretary of Defense directed the Air Force to develop a capability to disrupt civilian broadcasting networks and guerilla command and control networks. In response, Tactical Air Command began to test a tactical electronic warfare support system that would be installed on C-121s, named Coronet Solo. Coronet Solo aircraft would be able to join or disrupt commercial radio and television and to broadcast prerecorded programs, in addition to having an ECM capability.

=== Tactical electronic warfare ===
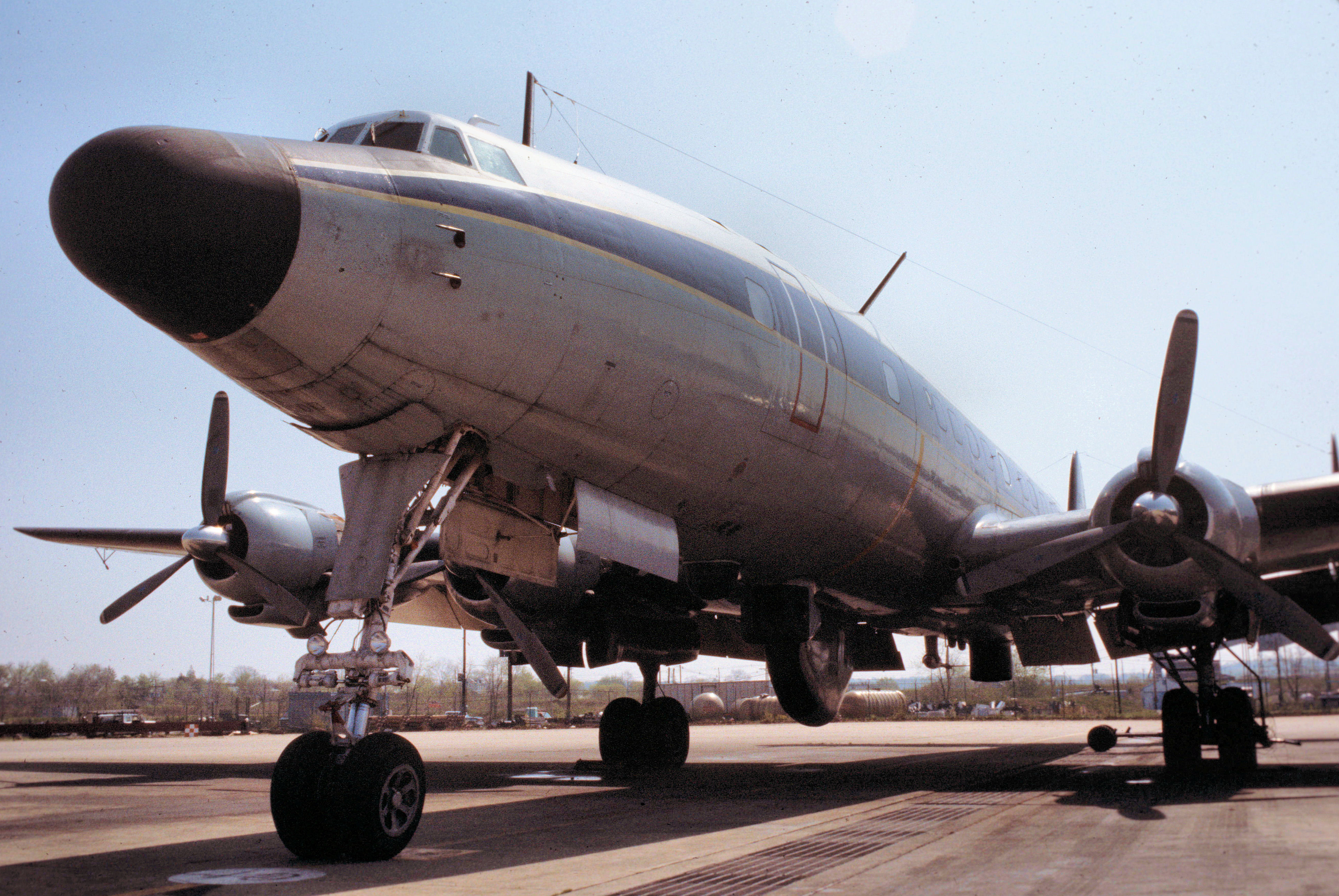
Group EC-121 Constellation in 1978

Threatened by the closure of Olmsted (now Harrisburg Air National Guard Base) and by the downsizing of all conventionally powered transport aircraft, the National Guard Bureau volunteered the 168th for the Coronet Solo psychological warfare capability in 1967. The 168th Military Airlift Group and its components were inactivated and its resources were transferred to the new 193rd Tactical Electronic Warfare Group, which became Tactical Air Command's first tactical electronic warfare unit that was not an active duty unit. Tactical Air Command replaced Military Airlift Command as its mobilization gaining command, although the unit continued to operate the C-121s of the old 168th Group until November 1977, when its last C-121C was flown to the Military Aircraft Storage and Disposition Center at Davis-Monthan Air Force Base, Arizona.

The first Lockheed EC-121S Coronet Solo was delivered to the unit on 16 July 1968. In July 1970, the Joint Chiefs of Staff directed the deployment of a task force of two EC-121s and supporting personnel to Korat Royal Thai Air Force Base as Operation Coronet Cobra. The task force arrived at Korat on 31 July, where it began Operation Commando Buzz, retransmitting civilian radio broadcasts to outlying areas of Cambodia until improved ground transmitters were available to cover the area. The 193rd deployed guardsmen on temporary duty for periods of thirty to sixty days to support this mission. Although Commando Buzz was intended to last only ninety days, flights continued until 24 December, and the task force returned to the United States in early January 1971. Throughout the 1970s, the wing earned a reputation as being the most deployed Air National Guard unit, sometimes deploying 10 times in a single year.

In August 1977, the group received its first Lockheed C-130E Hercules. These aircraft were to be modified to Lockheed EC-130E Volant Solo standard, to perform the unit mission, but the first modified airplane did not arrive until March 1979. In May of that year, the unit's (and the Air Force's) last EC-121 departed for storage. Shortly thereafter, the unit designation became the 193rd Electronic Warfare Group.

The 193rd participated in the rescue of American citizens in Operation Urgent Fury in 1983. The aircraft acted as an airborne radio station, keeping the citizens of Grenada informed about the U.S. military action.

=== Special operations ===
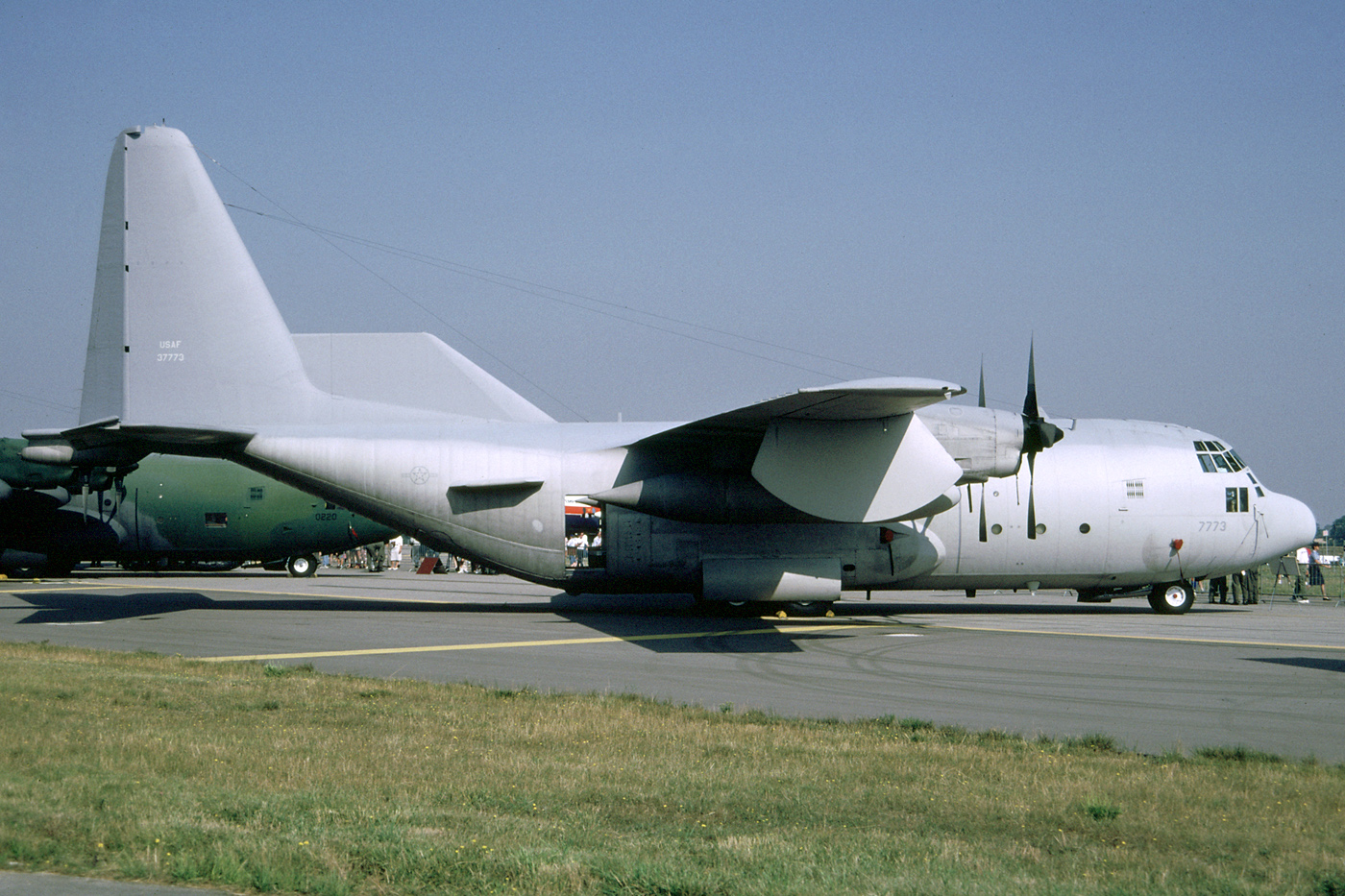
Group EC-130E at the 1989 Royal Air International Tattoo

Shortly after supporting Urgent Fury, and recognizing the importance of the group's psychological warfare mission when compared to its electronic jamming mission, on 15 November 1983, the group became the 193rd Special Operations Group and, along with all other reserve force special operations units, its gaining command became Military Airlift Command's Twenty-Third Air Force.

In 1989, Volant Solo was instrumental in the success of coordinated psychological operations in Operation Just Cause, operating under the control of the Joint Special Operations Task Force. During this mission it broadcast throughout the initial phases of the operation, helping to end the Noriega regime.

In 1990, Air Force Special Operations Command became the group's gaining command, and the wing's aircraft were redesignated Commando Solo, (Note: van Geffen indicates that the Commando Solo name change occurred later, when the unit's EC-130Es were modified with Worldwide Color Television and Horizontal Trailing Wire Antennas, in 1997. van Gellen, p. 12.)} with no change in mission. However, the unit's aircraft contained two difference suites of electronics. Four unit aircraft had the Rivet Rider system, which enabled broadcasting of TV, AM or FM radio, and short wave radio. These planes could also conduct limited intelligence gathering and military communications jamming missions. The other four were Comfy Levy aircraft, which flew Senior Scout and Senior Hunter missions, with personnel from Electronic Security Command in the cargo compartment. The Comfy Levy were basically "slick" C-130s with palletized mission systems and clip-on antennas. When these aircraft were not performing "Senior" missions they were used to transport cargo and passengers.

Following the agreement of Governor Bob Casey Sr. for the use of members of the Pennsylvania Air National Guard, on 23 August 1990, Central Command Air Forces directed the deployment of two Rivet Rider and two Comfy Levy EC-130Es from the group to King Fahd International Airport, Saudi Arabia. The two "slick" EC-130Es made several trips each between the United States and Saudi Arabia, transporting equipment and personnel. The group flew its first communications intelligence mission on 4 September. Because of limitations on the period volunteer guardsmen could serve, personnel were switched out every thirty days, with some group members serving as many as five tours. In November, the group began regular flights broadcasting Voice of America programs to Kuwait and Iraq.

Due to the threat of SCUD missile attacks, and the lack of revetments at King Fahd, in January 1992, the group's aircraft relocated to Thumrait Air Base, Oman. When Operation Desert Storm replaced Operation Desert Shield, the squadron provided or supplemented electronic countermeasures nearly every day. Its missions included broadcasting the "Voice of the Gulf" and other highly successful programs intended to convince Iraqi soldiers to surrender. In February, the group was partially mobilized, with 44 officers and 222 enlisted personnel being called to active duty. This enabled the group to deploy an aircraft to Incirlik Air Base, Turkey to support Joint Task Force Proven Force. On 26 March, the unit demobilized and returned to Harrisburg. 560 unit members had participated in the campaign, and flew 845 hours of combat operations.

In 1992, the 193rd received its first EC-130E upgraded to Commando Solo II configuration. In 1994, the Commando Solo II aircraft were used to broadcast radio and TV messages to the citizens and leaders of Haiti during Operation Uphold Democracy. President Jean-Bertrand Aristide was featured in these broadcasts, which contributed to the orderly transition from military rule to democracy.

The Air National Guard reorganized its units to reflect the Combat Wing Organization in 1995. As a result, the group became the 193rd Special Operations Wing with three subordinate groups.

Continuing its tradition, in 1997 the 193rd and Commando Solo supported the United Nations' Operation Joint Guard with radio and TV broadcasts over Bosnia-Herzegovina in support of stabilization force operations. In 1998, the unit and its aircraft participated in Operation Desert Thunder, a deployment to Southwest Asia to convince Iraq to comply with U.N. Security Council resolutions. The Commando Solo II was again sent into action in 1999 in support of Operation Allied Force. The aircraft was tasked to broadcast radio and television into Kosovo to prevent ethnic cleansing and assist in the expulsion of the Serbs from the region. In 2001, the Commando Solo II aircraft broadcast messages to the local Afghan population and Taliban soldiers during Operation Enduring Freedom.

In 2002, it was announced that the unit would replace three of its EC-130Es with EC-130Js. The modification of C-130Js would be done in two phases. Phase I added an information warfare station and air refueling capability, while Phase II called for the removal of mission equipment from the EC-130s and its installation in the EC-130Js. Ultimately, while all the unit's aircraft went through Phase I, only five went through Phase II.

In 2003, the Commando Solo II was deployed to the Middle East in support of Operation Iraqi Freedom. In 2004, the 193rd received newer EC-130J aircraft. These were quickly redeployed to the Middle East in support of the War on Terror.

On 17 September 2022, the wing made its last broadcast with an EC-130J during an airshow at Lancaster Airport, Pennsylvania. The unit is expected to transition to the MC-130J Commando II over a period of 2 years.

== Lineage ==
- Constituted as the 193d Tactical Electronic Warfare Group on 1 September 1967

Activated on 17 September 1967
Redesignated 193d Electronic Combat Group on 10 October 1980
Redesignated 193d Special Operations Group on 15 November 1983
Redesignated 193rd Special Operations Wing on 1 October 1995

=== Assignments ===
- Pennsylvania Air National Guard, 16 September 1967 – present

Gained by Tactical Air Command, 16 September 1967
Gained by Twenty-Third Air Force, Military Airlift Command, 1 March 1983
Gained by Air Force Special Operations Command, 22 May 1990 – present

=== Operational components ===
- 193rd Operations Group, 1 June 1995 – present
- 193rd Special Operations Squadron, 16 September 1967 – 1 June 1995

=== Stations ===
- Olmsted Air Force Base (later Harrisburg International Airport, Harrisburg Air National Guard Base), Pennsylvania, 16 September 1967 – present

=== Aircraft ===
- Lockheed C-121C Constellation, 1967–1977
- Lockheed EC-121S Coronet Solo, 1968–1979
- Lockheed C-130E Hercules, 1977-1979
- Lockheed EC-130E Volant Solo (later Commando Solo), 1979–2004
- Lockheed C-130H Hercules, 1991-1995
- Lockheed EC-130J Commando Solo, 2001–2024
- Lockheed MC-130J Commando II, 2023-present

== Decorations ==
Award streamer	Award	Dates	Notes
	Air Force Outstanding Unit Award		
