= Pennsylvania Air National Guard =

- Pennsylvania Air National Guard emblem
- Active: 27 June 1924 – present
- Country: United States
- Allegiance: Pennsylvania
- Branch: Air National Guard
- Type: State militia, military reserve force
- Role: "To meet commonwealth and federal mission responsibilities."
- Part of: Pennsylvania Department of Military and Veterans Affairs; United States National Guard Bureau
- Garrison/HQ: Pennsylvania Air National Guard, Joint Force Headquarters, Bldg. S-0-47, Fort Indiantown Gap, Annville, PA 17003
- Mottos: Pro Civitate et Patria (Latin); For State and Country

Commanders
- Civilian leadership: President Donald Trump (Commander-in-Chief); Troy Meink (Secretary of the Air Force); Governor Josh Shapiro (Governor of the Commonwealth of Pennsylvania)
- Commonwealth military leadership: Major General Mark J. Schindler (The Adjutant General); Brigadier General Terrence L. Koudelka Jr. (Deputy Adjutant General-Air)

The Pennsylvania Air National Guard (PA ANG) is the aerial militia of the U.S. state of Pennsylvania. It is a reserve of the United States Air Force and along with the Pennsylvania Army National Guard an element of the Pennsylvania National Guard of the larger United States National Guard Bureau.

As commonwealth militia units, the units in the Pennsylvania Air National Guard are not in the normal United States Air Force chain of command. They are under the jurisdiction of the governor of Pennsylvania through the office of the Pennsylvania Adjutant General unless they are federalized by order of the president of the United States. The Pennsylvania Air National Guard is headquartered at Fort Indiantown Gap, Pennsylvania, and its commander is Brigadier General Michael J. Regan Jr.

== Overview ==
Under the "Total Force" concept, Pennsylvania Air National Guard units are considered to be Air Reserve Components (ARC) of the United States Air Force (USAF). Pennsylvania ANG units are trained and equipped by the Air Force and are operationally gained by a major command of the USAF if federalized. In addition, the Pennsylvania Air National Guard forces are assigned to Air Expeditionary Forces and are subject to deployment tasking orders along with their active duty and Air Force Reserve counterparts in their assigned cycle deployment window.

Along with their federal reserve obligations, as commonwealth militia units the elements of the Pennsylvania ANG are subject to being activated by order of the governor to provide protection of life and property, and preserve peace, order and public safety. Commonwealth missions include disaster relief in times of earthquakes, hurricanes, floods and forest fires, search and rescue, protection of vital public services, and support to civil defense.

== Components ==
The Pennsylvania Air National Guard consists of the following major units:

- 111th Attack Wing

Established 27 June 1924 (as: 103d Observation Squadron)
Stationed at: Horsham Air National Guard Station, Willow Grove
Gained by: Air Combat Command
As a result of BRAC 2005 directives, the wing’s A-10 Thunderbolt II close air support aircraft have been transferred out of Pennsylvania and the wing continues conversion to new engineering and non-flying air support operations missions. Although the NAS JRB Willow Grove base will reduce in size as some military organizations leave over the next few years as a result of BRAC, the base will remain open and the wing will continue to train on its new missions. The wing hosts several new tenant organizations at the base including units of the Pennsylvania Army National Guard and the U.S. Army Reserve, among others.

- 171st Air Refueling Wing

Established 22 April 1949 (as: 146th Fighter Squadron); operates: KC-135T Stratotanker
Stationed at: Pittsburgh IAP Air Reserve Station, Coraopolis, PA
Gained by: Air Mobility Command
The 171st ARW provides aerial refueling capability to U.S. and Allied forces worldwide using the KC-135 Stratotanker aircraft.

- 193d Special Operations Wing

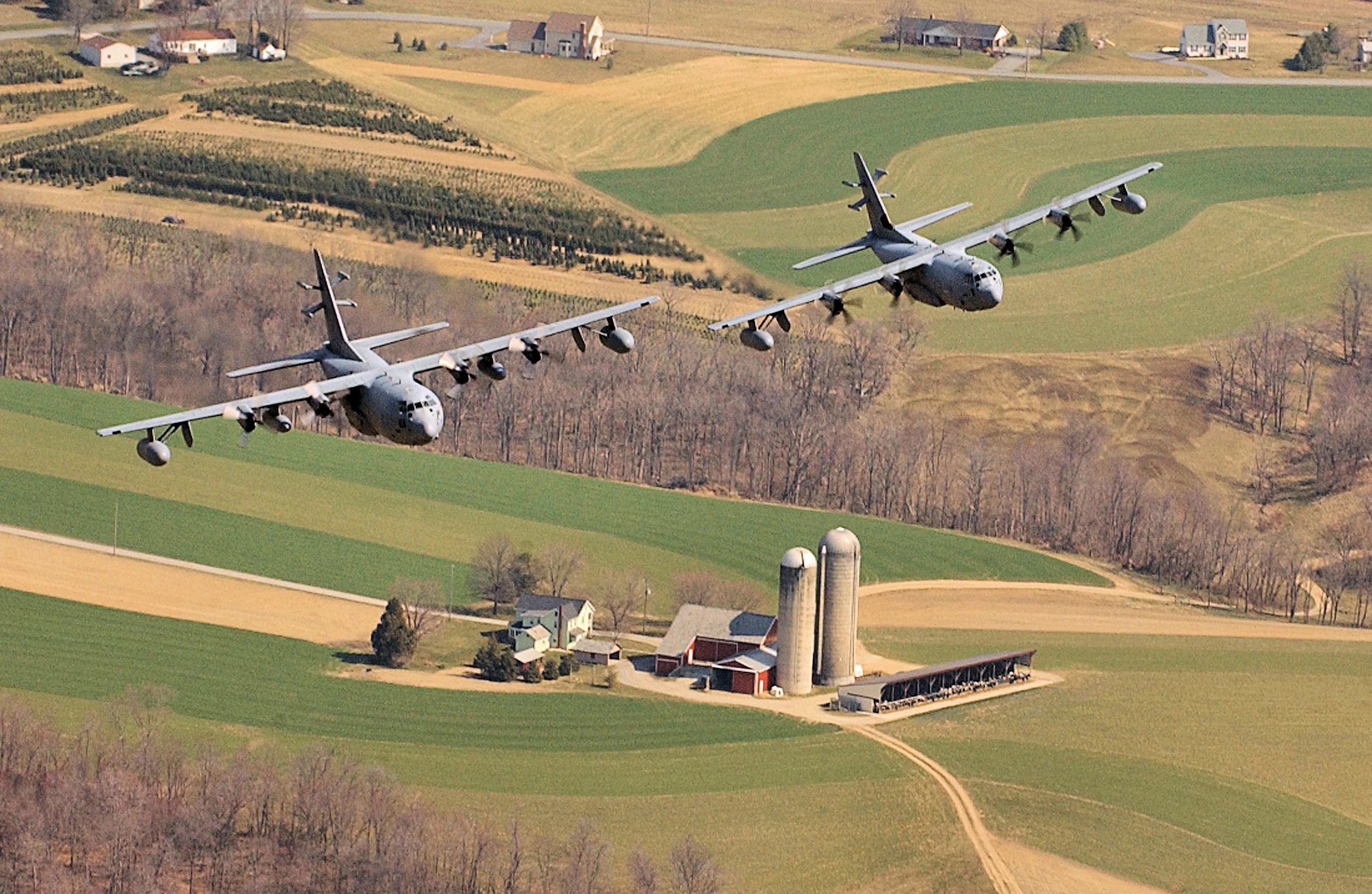
EC-130Js of the 193d Special Operations Wing flying over South Central Pennsylvania, 2006.

Established 27 February 1947 (as: 148th Fighter Squadron); operates: MC-130J Commando II
Stationed at: Olmsted Air National Guard Base, Middletown
Gained by: Air Force Special Operations Command
In September 2022, the 193d SOW retired its EC-130Js. The wing began to receive its new MC-130J Commando II aircraft the following February. This marked the divestment of the EC-130J from the Total Force inventory; there are no more current operators of the Commando Solo.

Support Unit Functions and Capabilities:

- 193d Air Operations Group, located in State College, Pennsylvania.
- 201st Red Horse Civil Engineering Flight, located at Fort Indiantown Gap.
- Regional Equipment Operators Training Site, located at Fort Indiantown Gap.
- 203d Weather Flight, located at Fort Indiantown Gap.
- 211th Engineering Installation Squadron, located at Fort Indiantown Gap.
- 258th Air Traffic Control Squadron, located at Johnstown-Cambria County Airport
- 270th Engineering Installation Squadron, located at Willow Grove Air Reserve Station.
- 271st Combat Communications Squadron, located at Fort Indiantown Gap.
- 553d Air Force Band (Air National Guard Band of the Mid-Atlantic), located at Fort Indiantown Gap.
- Lightning Force Academy, affiliated with the Community College of the Air Force and is located at Fort Indiantown Gap.
- Bollen Air-to-Ground Weapons Range, located at Fort Indiantown Gap.

== History ==
=== Origins ===
The Militia Act of 1903 established the present National Guard system, units raised by the states but paid for by the Federal Government, liable for immediate state service. If federalized by Presidential order, they fall under the regular military chain of command. On 1 June 1920, the Militia Bureau issued Circular No.1 on organization of National Guard air units.

The Pennsylvania Air National Guard was formed on 27 June 1924 as the 103d Squadron (Observation), Pennsylvania National Guard, received federal recognition as a Corps Aviation unit. The 103d was founded and eventually commanded by Major Charles Biddle, who had flown in World War I as part of the famous Lafayette Escadrille. This new National Guard squadron was based on the sod fields of Philadelphia Airport as a unit in the Army 28th Division. It is one of the 29 original National Guard Observation Squadrons of the United States Army National Guard formed before World War II.

The pilots of the 103d flew a wide variety of observation aircraft for the next 18 years. The most well-known of these aircraft was the JN-4 Jenny. The Jenny was an open-cockpit bi-plane; but was replaced in the 1930s and early 1940s with metal-skinned, prop-driven observation monoplanes. The list is long but shows the steady improvement in aircraft: PT-1, BT-1, O-1, O-2H, O-11, O-38, O-46,-47A, O-47B, O-49, O-52, O-57 and P434-1. The squadron also flew liaison type aircraft such as the L-4 and L-1B. The 103d Observation Squadron was ordered into active service on 125 November 1940 as part of the buildup of the Army Air Corps prior to the United States entry into World War II.

=== Postwar Era ===
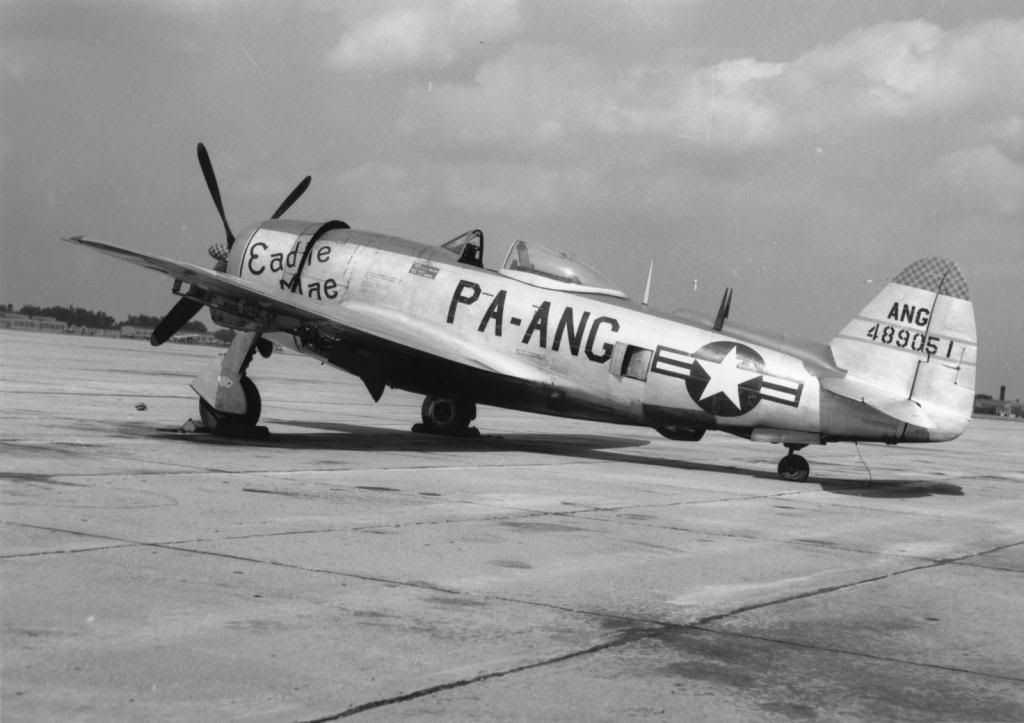
F-47N Thunderbolt of the 146th Fighter Squadron in 1954.

On 24 May 1946, the United States Army Air Forces, in response to dramatic postwar military budget cuts imposed by President Harry S. Truman, allocated inactive unit designations to the National Guard Bureau for the formation of an Air Force National Guard. These unit designations were allotted and transferred to various State National Guard bureaus to provide them unit designations to re-establish them as Air National Guard units.

The modern Pennsylvania ANG received federal recognition on 17 January 1947 as the 53d Fighter Wing at Philadelphia International Airport. The 53d was a command and control organization, controlling the 148th Fighter Squadron at Reading Airport, receiving federal recognition and activated on 27 February 1947. Other units of the newly formed PA ANG were the 146th Fighter Squadron and 147th Fighter Squadron at Pittsburgh IAP, receiving federal recognition and activated on 20 December 1948 and 111th Bombardment Group (Light) and its subordinate 103d Bombardment Squadron, at Philadelphia IAP. The 111th and 103d received federal recognition and were activated on 20 December 1948.

The Reading and Pittsburgh units were equipped with F-51D Mustangs, with a mission of air defense of the Commonwealth. The 111th Bombardment Group in Philadelphia was equipped with B-26 Invaders, assigned to Tactical Air Command as a light bombardment unit. The 53d Wing was also the headquarters for an Aircraft Control & Warning Group (AC&W Gp)located at Harrisburg State Airport and three Air Service Groups, which were colocated with its flying groups and had flights located with each of the squadrons assigned to the flying groups.

The 112th Fighter Group was federally recognized and activated at Pittsburgh on 22 April 1949, controlling the 146th, 147th and the 148th Fighter Squadrons.

At the end of October 1950, the ANG converted to the wing-base (Hobson Plan) organization. As a result, the wing was withdrawn from the Air National Guard and inactivated on 31 October 1950. Its personnel and those of its 211th Air Service Group formed the cadre for the 111th Composite Wing, while its elements in Pittsburgh formed the cadre for the 112th Fighter Wing, which were simultaneously allotted to the ANG and activated. The 153d AC&W Gp was transferred directly to the PA ANG.

=== Korean War ===
The Philadelphia 103d Bomb Squadron was federalized on 10 October 1950 along with its parent 111th Composite Wing due to the Korean War. Many of the pilots and maintenance personnel were split off and sent for duty overseas as individuals assigned to other combat units there. Eventually the B-26 bombers were sent as reinforcement aircraft to Far East Air Force for use in Korea. On 10 April 1951 the squadron and Wing were moved to Fairchild AFB, Washington and re-equipped with RB-29 Superfortress reconnaissance aircraft.

On 13 June 1952, two PA ANG pilots were flying an RB-29 over the Soviet Union when they were shot down by a pair of MiG-15s. The RB-29 was never recovered, having crashed in the waters off of Vladivostok, Russia. The Pennsylvanian families of the Air Guard pilots were told they had simply "vanished" in a weather-reconnaissance flight near Japan. It wasn't until the fall of the Soviet Union and the opening of communist archives that the relatives found out the truth in 1993. It is unknown as to whether any of the pilots or crew of this aircraft were captured by the Soviets at that time.

In February 1951 the 148th Fighter Squadron at Reading was activated for the Korean War. The squadron was sent to Dover AFB, Delaware where it assumed an air defense mission.

By 1 November 1952, all federalized PA ANG units were returned to Commonwealth control.

=== Cold War ===
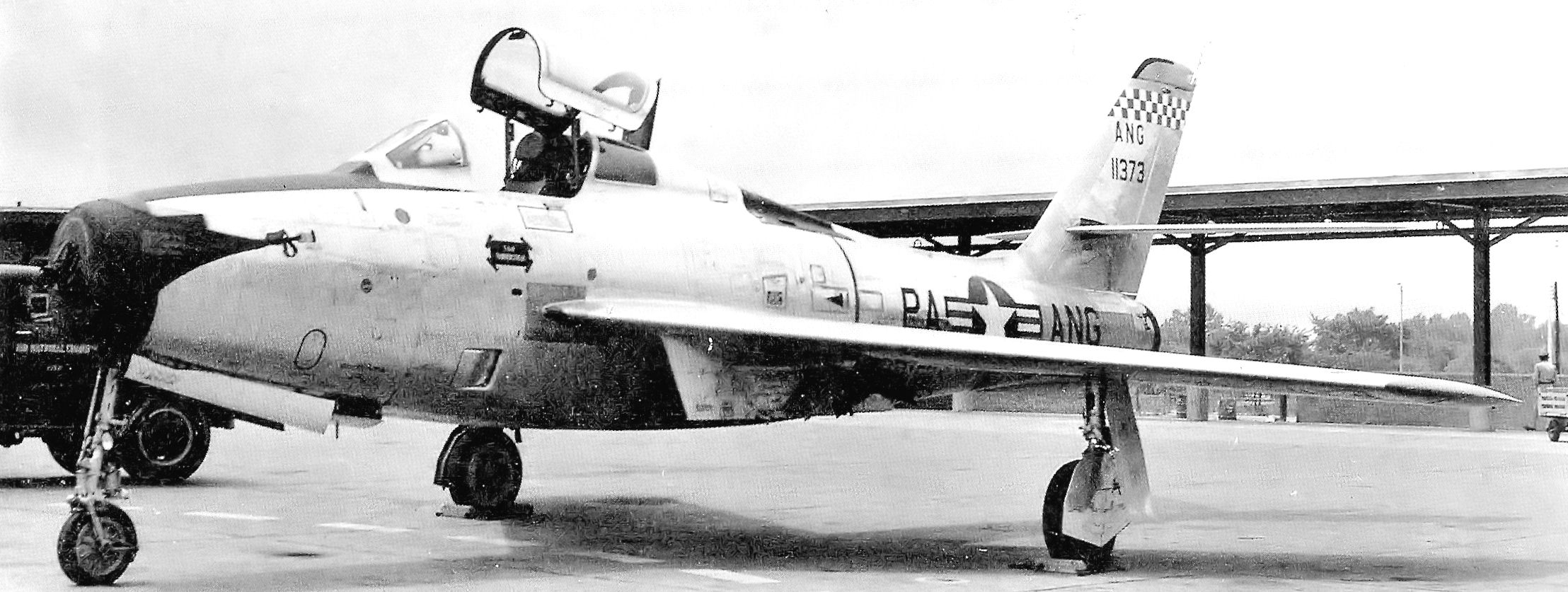
F-84F Thunderstreak of the 103d Fighter-Interceptor Squadron at Philadelphia International Airport in 1955.

In 1953, the 111th units at Philadelphia Airport were re-equipped with North American F-51D Mustangs and assumed an air defense mission. At Reading, the 148th Fighter-Interceptor Squadron (FIS) continued its air defense mission with the Mustang until 1956. With the end of the line for the Mustang in USAF service, the United States Air Force, in an effort to upgrade to an all jet fighter force, required Air National Guard Air Defense Command units to upgrade to jet-powered aircraft. The Reading Airport Commission and National Guard authorities found themselves in a conflict over the use of Reading Municipal Airport for tactical jet operations. Unable to resolve these differences, the USAF inactivated the 148th Fighter-Interceptor Squadron on 30 June 1956.

The 140th Aeromedical Transport Squadron was bestowed the lineage and history of the inactivated Pennsylvania ANG's 148th FIS. The unit was re-equipped with the Curtiss C-46 Commando, and in 1958 the Fairchild C-119 Flying Boxcar. In 1960, the 140th was notified that it would be converting once again to the much larger and faster Lockheed C-121 Constellation. Due to longer runway requirements, the C-121s could not fly from Reading Airport, and on 1 February 1961 the unit relocated to its current location at Olmsted Air Force Base (present day Harrisburg Air National Guard Base) due to the inadequate facilities at Reading.

At Pittsburgh, the 147th Fighter Squadron was authorized to expand to a group level, and the 171st Air Transport Group was established on 1 February 1961. The air defense mission was changed to a military airlift mission.

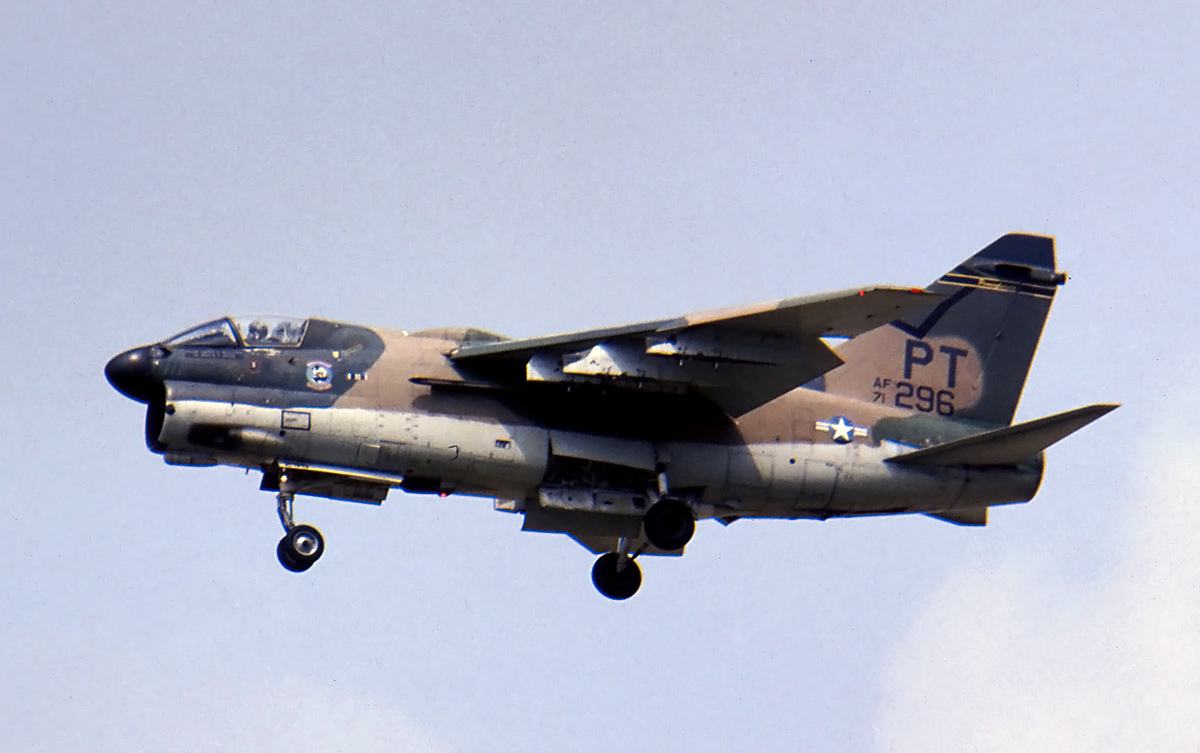
Pennsylvania ANG A-7 on short final at RAF Wittering, 1983.

In 1962, the 111th transitioned from flying air defense missions to flying a large, heavy transport—the Boeing C-97 Stratofreighter, a double-decked, four-engine airplane. In 1963, the 111th ended its 39-year history at Philadelphia Airport and moved to brand new facilities on the north end of the Willow Grove Naval Air Station. From Willow Grove, the C-97 was used to transport troops and cargo all over the world

During the Vietnam War, the PA Air Guard flew 134 supply missions to Vietnam in 1966–1967, becoming the first reserve air force ever to enter a combat zone without actually being mobilized.

In 1972, widespread flooding in the aftermath of Hurricane Agnes resulted in 45 deaths and $3 billion in property damage. Nearly 13,000 Army and Air Guard members were called to state active duty to help with relief operations.

In 1975, the 112th Tactical Fighter Group ended its air defense mission, receiving its first A-7D Corsair II aircraft and was reassigned to the Tactical Air Command. In 1991, with the retirement of the A-7D, the 112th TFG became the 112th Air Refueling Group (ARG) under Strategic Air Command, receiving KC-135 Stratotankers that it operated jointly with the 171st, which had become an air refueling Wing at Pittsburgh in October 1972.

Several Air Guard units from Pennsylvania were mobilized in 1990-1991 for duty in Southwest Asia during Operation Desert Shield and Operation Desert Storm. Every member returned home safely.

=== Modern era ===
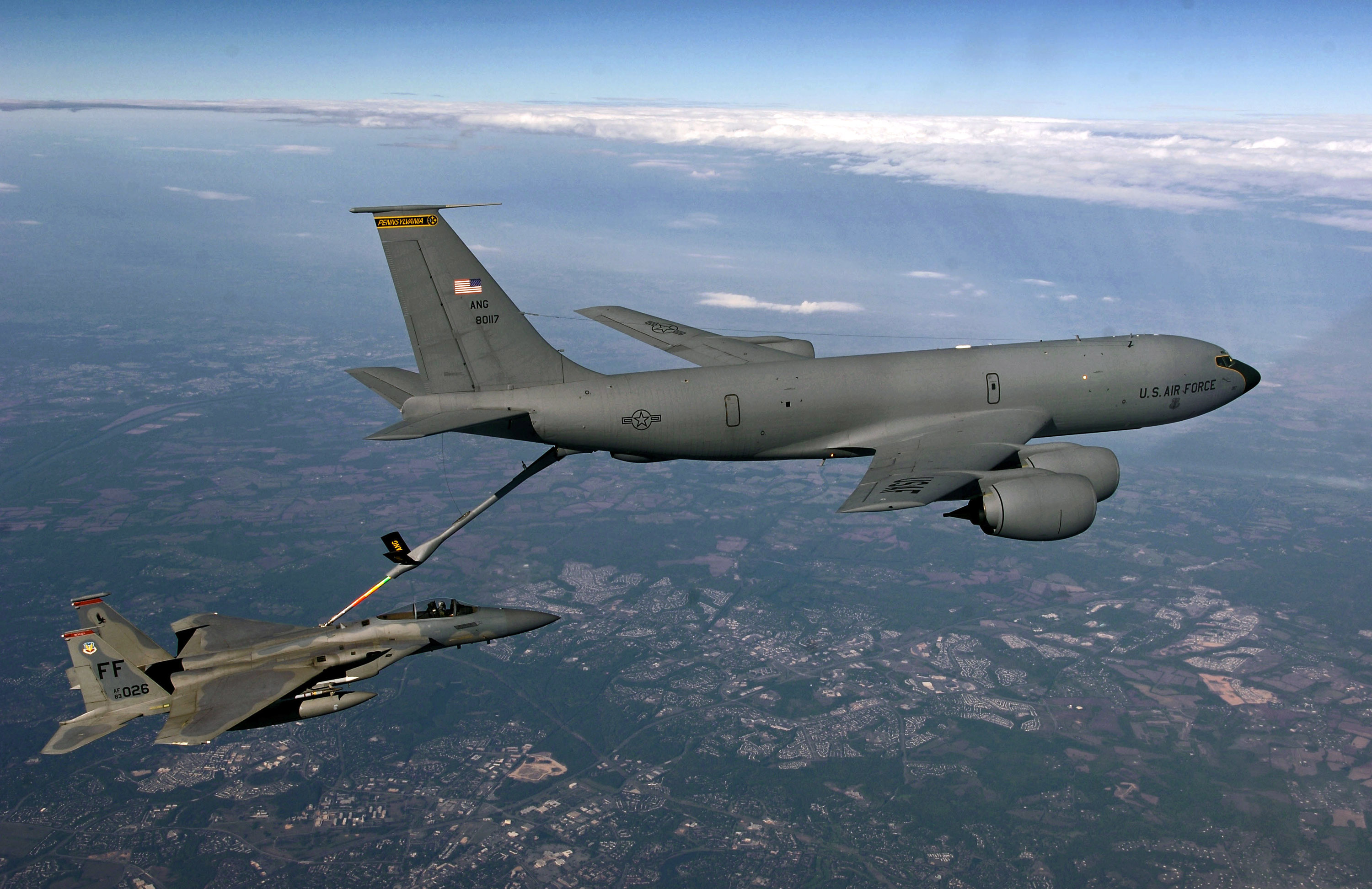
KC-135T Stratotanker from the 171st Air Refueling Wing over Washington D.C., refueling an F-15C on October 7, 2007.

Strategic Air Command was inactivated in June 1992 and the 112th ARG became a part of the Air Combat Command (ACC). On 1 October 1993, with both the 112th Air Refueling Group and the 171st Air Refueling Wing at Pittsburgh, the two tanker units were consolidated with the 146th Air Refueling Squadron being reassigned to the 171st Operations Group and once again reuniting with the 147th under the same group. The 112th Air Refueling Group was inactivated.

Hundreds of Pennsylvania soldiers and airmen were deployed to Germany, Hungary and Bosnia in 1996–1997, in support of United Nations peacekeeping efforts in the former Yugoslavia.

In 2003, some 2,000 Pennsylvania citizen soldiers and airmen were deployed in support of Operation Iraqi Freedom, searching for weapons of mass destruction, providing convoy security, rebuilding infrastructure and protecting senior officials.

2,500 Pennsylvania Army and Air National Guard members were deployed in September 2005 for a month-long mission in support of hurricane disaster relief efforts along the Gulf Coast in the aftermath of Hurricane Katrina. This was the largest state activation of Pennsylvania National Guard troops since Hurricane Agnes in 1972. These Guard members also assisted with relief efforts following Hurricane Rita.

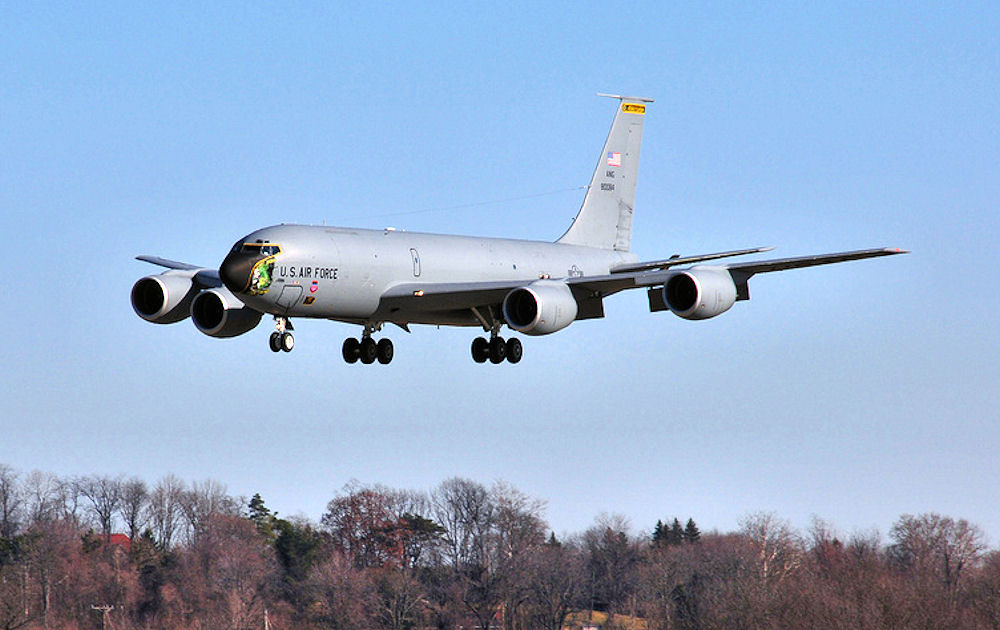
KC-135 Stratotanker from the 171st Air Refueling Wing landing at Pittsburgh International Airport, January 3, 2011.

In its 2005 BRAC Recommendations, DoD recommended the 111th Fighter Wing be inactivated and its assigned A-10 aircraft be reassigned to the 124th Wing (ANG), Gowen Field Air National Guard Base, Boise, ID (three primary aircraft); 175th Wing (ANG), Warfield Air National Guard Base, Baltimore, MD (three primary aircraft); 127th Wing (ANG), Selfridge Air National Guard Base, Mount Clemens, MI (three primary aircraft); and retire the remaining aircraft (six primary aircraft).

This recommendation was part of a larger BRAC recommendation that would close NAS JRB Willow Grove, Pennsylvania. DoD claimed that this recommendation would enable Air Force Future Total Force transformation by consolidating the A-10 fleet at installations of higher military value. Despite appeals from Ed Rendell, the Governor of Pennsylvania, the recommendations were upheld and the A-10s departed during 2010. The 103d Fighter Squadron inactivated on 31 March 2011.

In May 2020, the Pennsylvania Air National Guard conducted flyovers over the areas of Pittsburgh, Johnstown and Harrisburg to salute front line workers battling the COVID-19 pandemic. The aircraft used were the EC-130J Commando Solo and the Boeing KC-135 Stratotanker.

The 193d SOW retired its EC-130J Commando Solo aircraft in September 2022, and began to receive its new MC-130J Commando IIs in February 2023. As the 193d SOW was the only unit within the USAF Total Force to operate the EC-130J, this marked the complete divestment of the aircraft type from operational US military inventory.

== See also ==
- Pennsylvania State Guard
- Pennsylvania Wing Civil Air Patrol
