= List of United States Air Force training squadrons =

This is a list of United States Air Force training squadrons. It covers units that specialize in training such as combat training, flying training, and training squadrons and serves as a break out of the comprehensive List of United States Air Force squadrons. Units in this list are assigned to nearly every Major Command in the United States Air Force.

== Combat Training Squadrons ==
Squadron	Shield	Location	Nickname	Note
USAFE Warrior Preparation Center		Einsiedlerhof AS		Integrated Air and Missile Defense
6th Combat Training Squadron		Nellis AFB	"Gators"	AGOS
7th Combat Training Squadron		Holloman AFB		Redesignated 7th Fighter Squadron
12th Combat Training Squadron		Fort Irwin	"Ravens"	
31st Combat Training Squadron		Nellis AFB		
34th Combat Training Squadron		Little Rock AFB	"Cougars"	Green Flag
319th Combat Training Squadron		Peterson AFB		Advanced Space Operations School (ASOpS)
330th Combat Training Squadron				
338th Combat Training Squadron		Offutt AFB	"Topcats"	
353d Combat Training Squadron		Eielson AFB		Red Flag - Alaska
392d Combat Training Squadron		Vandenberg AFB		ICBM Operations
394th Combat Training Squadron		Whiteman AFB	"Panthers"	
414th Combat Training Squadron		Nellis AFB		Red Flag
421st Combat Training Squadron				
497th Combat Training Squadron		Paya Lebar Air Base		Commando Sling
505th Combat Training Squadron		Hurlburt Field		
507th Combat Training Squadron		Nellis AFB		
548th Combat Training Squadron		Fort Johnson		
549th Combat Training Squadron		Nellis AFB		
705th Combat Training Squadron		Kirtland AFB		

== Flying Training Squadrons ==
Squadron	Shield	Location	Nickname	Note
1st Flying Training Squadron		Pueblo Municipal Airport		
3d Flying Training Squadron		Vance AFB	"Peugeots"/"Jayhawks"	T-1 Jayhawk
5th Flying Training Squadron		Vance AFB	"Spittin' Kittens"	T-1 Jayhawk; T-6 Texan II; T-38 Talon
7th Flying Training Squadron				Closed
8th Flying Training Squadron		Vance AFB	"Eight Ballers"	T-6 Texan II
23d Flying Training Squadron		Ft Novosel		UH-1 Iroquois
25th Flying Training Squadron		Vance AFB	"Shooters"	T-38 Talon
26th Flying Training Squadron				Inactivated
32d Flying Training Squadron		Vance AFB		T-1 Jayhawk
33d Flying Training Squadron		Vance AFB	"Dragons"	T-6 Texan II
35th Flying Training Squadron			"Pretvels"	Inactivated
37th Flying Training Squadron		Columbus AFB	"Bengal Tigers"	T-6 Texan II
39th Flying Training Squadron			"Cobras"	Inactivated 2007
41st Flying Training Squadron		Columbus AFB	"Flying Buzzsaws"	T-6 Texan II
43d Flying Training Squadron		Columbus AFB		T-1 Jayhawk; T-38 Talon
48th Flying Training Squadron		Columbus AFB	"Alley Cats"	T-1 Jayhawk
49th Fighter Training Squadron		Columbus AFB	"Black Knights"	T-38 Talon
50th Flying Training Squadron		Columbus AFB	"Strikin' Snakes"	T-38 Talon
52d Expeditionary Flying Training Squadron		Kirkuk AB	"Gators"	C-172; C-208
53d Flying Training Squadron			"Black Knights"	Inactivated
54th Flying Training Squadron				Redesignated 54th Air Refueling Squadron
70th Flying Training Squadron		Air Force Academy		
84th Flying Training Squadron		Laughlin AFB	"Panthers"	T-6 Texan II
85th Flying Training Squadron		Laughlin AFB	"Tigers"	T-6 Texan II
86th Flying Training Squadron		Laughlin AFB	"Lobos"	T-1 Jayhawk
87th Flying Training Squadron		Laughlin AFB	"Red Bulls"	T-38 Talon
88th Fighter Training Squadron		Sheppard AFB	"Lucky Devils"	T-38 Talon
89th Flying Training Squadron		Sheppard AFB	"Banshees"	T-6 Texan II
90th Flying Training Squadron		Sheppard AFB	"Boxing Bears"	T-38 Talon
94th Flying Training Squadron		Air Force Academy		TG-16; TG-15
96th Flying Training Squadron		Laughlin AFB		T-1 Jayhawk; T-6 Texan II; T-38 Talon
97th Flying Training Squadron		Sheppard AFB	"Devil Cats"	
98th Flying Training Squadron		Air Force Academy		UV-18 Twin Otter
99th Flying Training Squadron		Randolph AFB		T-1 Jayhawk
100th Flying Training Squadron		Randolph AFB		T-1 Jayhawk; T-6 Texan II; T-38 Talon
375th Flying Training Squadron				Closed
434th Fighter Training Squadron		Laughlin AFB	"Red Devils"	T-38 Talon
435th Fighter Training Squadron		Randolph AFB	"Black Eagles"	
449th Expeditionary Flying Training Squadron				
450th Expeditionary Flying Training Squadron				
451st Flying Training Squadron		NAS Pensacola		T-1A Jayhawk
452d Flying Training Squadron				Redesignated 452 FLTS
454th Flying Training Squadron				Closed
455th Flying Training Squadron		NAS Pensacola		T-6A Texan II
459th Flying Training Squadron		Sheppard AFB		T-6A Texan II
469th Flying Training Squadron		Sheppard AFB		T-38 Talon
557th Flying Training Squadron		Air Force Academy		
558th Flying Training Squadron			"Phantom Knights"	Inactivated 2006
559th Flying Training Squadron		Randolph AFB	"Billy Goats"	T-6 Texan II
560th Flying Training Squadron		Randolph AFB	"Chargin' Cheetahs"	T-38 Talon
562d Flying Training Squadron		Randolph AFB	"Gators"	T-43 Bobcat
563d Flying Training Squadron		Randolph AFB		T-43 Bobcat

== Training Squadrons ==
Squadron	Shield	Location	Nickname	Note
4th Training Squadron		Seymour Johnson AFB	Black Cats	F-15E Aircrew Academics
16th Training Squadron		Holloman AFB		MQ-9 Reaper training
22nd Training Squadron		Fairchild Air Force Base		Survival Training
23rd Training Squadron				oversees the abbreviated 5-week Commissioned Officer Training (COT) course designed for direct-commission professionals like doctors, lawyers, chaplains, and nurses. See Air Force Officer Training School
66th Training Squadron		Fairchild Air Force Base		SERE Instructor Training
97th Training Squadron		Altus AFB	Eagles	C-17A Globemaster III, Boeing KC-46A Pegasus & KC-135 Stratotanker aircrew training
311th Training Squadron		Presidio of Monterey	Eagles	Language Training
312th Training Squadron		Goodfellow AFB	Firedawgs	Technical Training
313th Training Squadron		Corry Station Naval Technical Training Center	Nighthawks	Technical Training
314th Training Squadron		Presidio of Monterey	Cougars	Language Training
315th Training Squadron		Goodfellow AFB	Rattlers	Technical Training
316th Training Squadron		Goodfellow AFB	Sharks	Technical Training
318th Training Squadron		Lackland AFB		Inter American Air Forces Academy Training
319th Training Squadron		Lackland AFB	Tigers	Basic Military Field and Academic Training
320th Training Squadron		Lackland AFB	Gators	Basic Military Training
321st Training Squadron		Lackland AFB	Warthogs	Basic Military Training
322d Training Squadron		Lackland AFB	Eagles	Basic Military Training
323d Training Squadron		Lackland AFB	Mustangs	Basic Military Training
324th Training Squadron		Lackland AFB	Knights	Basic Military Training
326th Training Squadron		Lackland AFB	Bulldogs	Basic Military Training
331st Training Squadron		Lackland AFB	Wolfpack	Basic Military Training
332d Training Squadron		Lackland AFB	Mad Dogs	English language training
333d Training Squadron		Keesler AFB		Technical Training
334th Training Squadron		Keesler AFB	Gators	Airfield Operations / Command and Control Technical Training
335th Training Squadron		Keesler AFB	Bulls	Technical Training
336th Training Squadron		Keesler AFB	Red Wolves	Cyberspace Technical Training
338th Training Squadron		Keesler AFB	Dark Knights	Technical Training
341st Training Squadron		Lackland AFB		Military Working Dog Training
342d Training Squadron		Lackland AFB		Pararescue/Tactical Air Control Party Training
343d Training Squadron		Lackland AFB		Security Forces Training
344th Training Squadron		Lackland AFB	Spartans	Aircrew Training
345th Training Squadron		Fort Gregg-Adams, VA		Logistics Training
360th Training Squadron		Sheppard AFB		Technical Training
361st Training Squadron		Sheppard AFB	Hellcats	Technical Training
362d Training Squadron		Sheppard AFB	Crewdogs	Technical Training/Crew Chiefs
363d Training Squadron		Sheppard AFB	Sidewinders	Technical Training
364th Training Squadron		Sheppard AFB	Golden Knights	Technical Training
365th Training Squadron		Sheppard AFB	Birds of Prey	Technical Training
366th Training Squadron		Sheppard AFB	Mean Machine	Technical Training
367th Training Squadron		Sheppard AFB		Technical Training
372d Training Squadron		Sheppard AFB		Technical Training
373d Training Squadron		Sheppard AFB		Technical Training
381st Training Squadron		Fort Sam Houston		Dental Training, Medical Education and Training Campus
382d Training Squadron		Fort Sam Houston		Medical Training, Medical Education and Training Campus
383d Training Squadron		Fort Sam Houston		Medical Training, Medical Education and Training Campus
392d Training Squadron		Vandenberg AFB		inactivated and reflagged to 392d Combat Training Squadron
436th Training Squadron		Dyess AFB	"Mustangs"	
532d Training Squadron		Vandenberg AFB		ICBM, Cruise missile and spacelift training
533d Training Squadron		Vandenberg AFB		Space Operations Training
534th Training Squadron		Vandenberg AFB		Space Systems Training
837th Training Squadron		Lackland AFB		Inter American Air Forces Academy Training

== Student Squadrons ==
Squadron	Shield	Location	Nickname	Note
14th Student Squadron		Columbus AFB		
21st Student Squadron		Maxwell AFB		
29th Student Squadron		Maxwell AFB	Dragons	
30th Student Squadron		Maxwell AFB	Knights	
31st Student Squadron		Maxwell AFB	Bulls	
32d Student Squadron		Maxwell AFB	Centurions	
33d Student Squadron		Maxwell AFB	Tigers	Squadron Officer School. Was 3833 SOS Student Squadron.
34th Student Squadron		Maxwell AFB	Orions	Squadron Officer School. Was 3834 SOS Student Squadron.
35th Student Squadron		Maxwell AFB	Eagles	
36th Student Squadron		Maxwell AFB	Blackhawks	
37th Student Squadron		Maxwell AFB	Gryphons	
38th Student Squadron		Maxwell AFB	Mustangs	
71st Student Squadron		Vance AFB		

== See also ==
- Training Support Squadrons (TRSS) at List of United States Air Force support squadrons
