= 132nd Air Refueling Squadron =

Maine Air National Guard unit

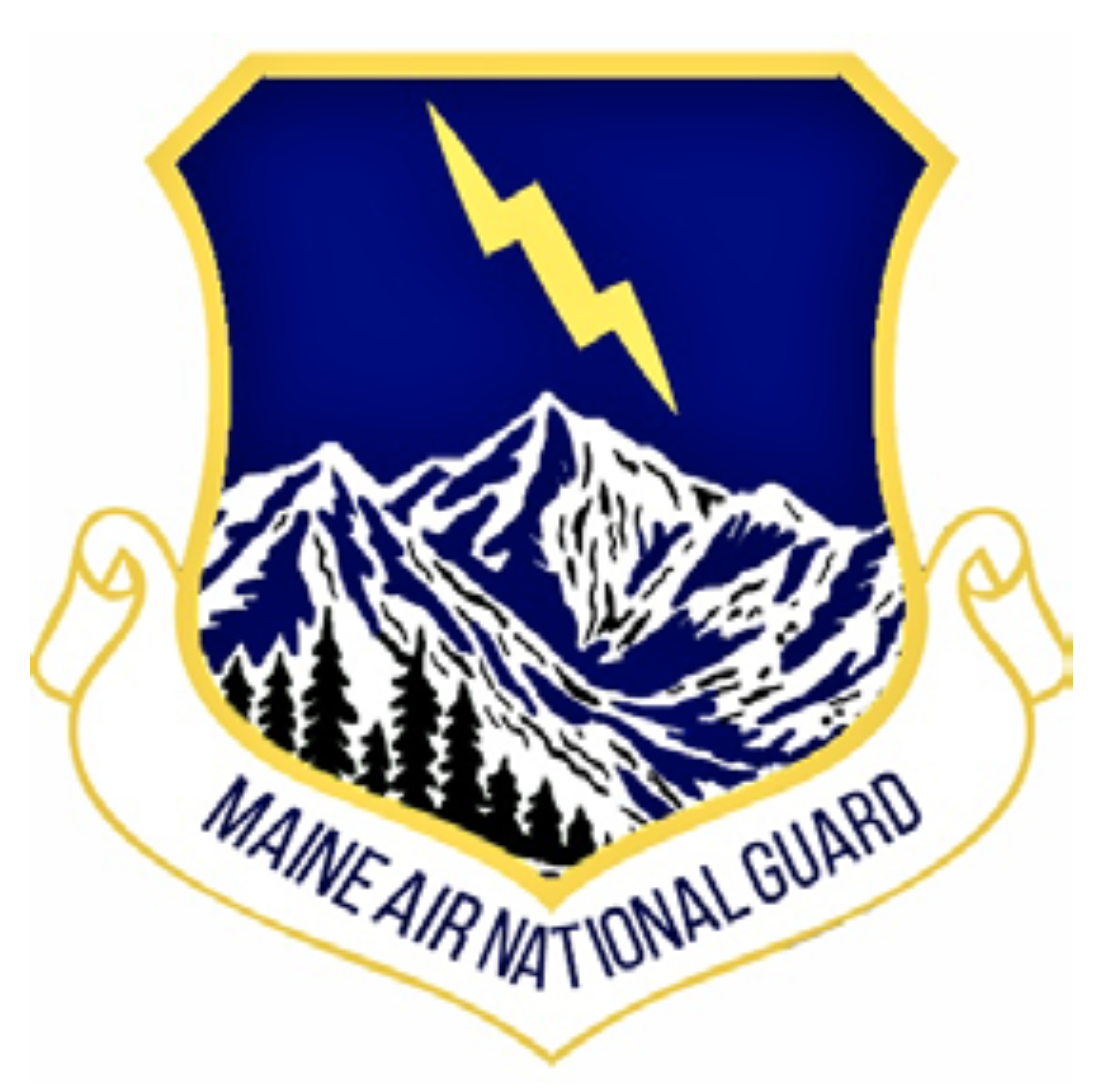
132nd Air Refueling Squadron

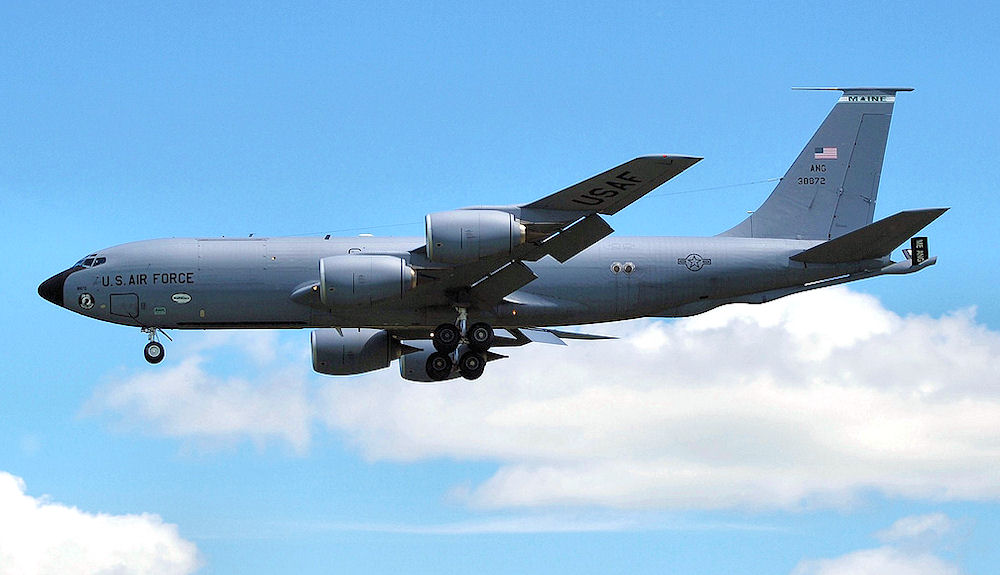
- Squadron KC-135A Stratotanker (Note: Aircraft is Boeing KC-135A-BN Stratotanker, serial 63-8872.)
- Active: 1942–1946; 1947–1952; 1952–present
- Country: United States
- Allegiance: Maine
- Branch: Air National Guard
- Type: Squadron
- Role: Aerial refueling
- Part of: Maine Air National Guard
- Garrison/HQ: Bangor Air National Guard Base, Maine
- Nickname: Dragon Flies (1943-1945) MAINEiacs (after 1947)
- Engagements: China Burma India Theater
- Decorations: Air Force Outstanding Unit Award

Insignia
- 132nd Air Refueling Squadron emblem

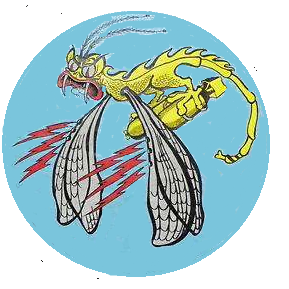
- 528th Fighter Squadron emblem

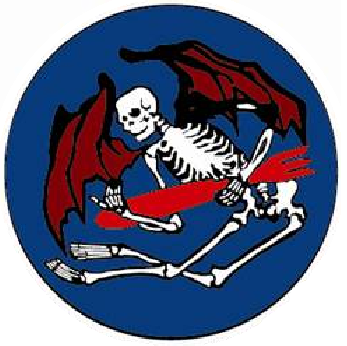
- 382nd Bombardment Squadron emblem

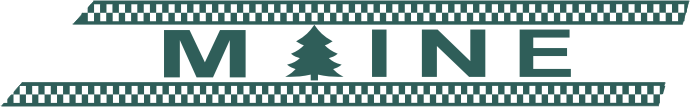
- Tail stripe

The 132nd Air Refueling Squadron is a unit of the Maine Air National Guard 101st Air Refueling Wing stationed at Bangor Air National Guard Base, Maine. It is equipped with the KC-135R Stratotanker.

The squadron was first activated in 1942 as the 382nd Bombardment Squadron. After training in the United States, it deployed to India in the summer of 1943 and entered combat as the 538th Fighter-Bomber Squadron. It moved to China in 1944. After V-J Day, it remained in China until December 1945, when it returned to the United States for inactivation.

In May 1946, it was redesignated the 132nd Fighter Squadron and allotted to the National Guard. It was called to active duty for the Korean War in 1951, serving in an air defense role until November 1952, when it was replaced by a regular Air Force squadron and returned to state control. It retained the air defense mission until 1976, when it converted to air refueling. It was called to active duty again for Operation Desert Storm. It has deployed personnel and aircraft to support operations word-wide since then.

== Mission ==
The squadron mission is to deploy and employ air refueling airlift, expeditionary aerospace and combat support forces around the world, while supporting national security, homeland defense, and State of Maine objectives at home.

== History ==
=== World War II ===
==== Training in the United States ====
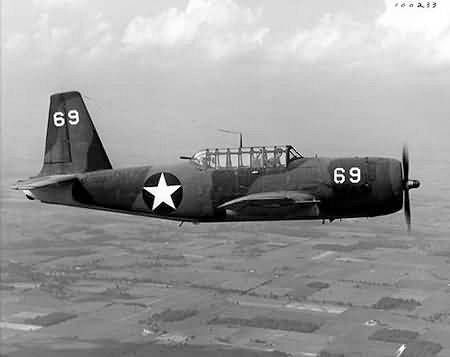
Vultee Vengeance of a training unit in the United States. (Note: Note the American national insigne, but Royal Air Force camouflage.)

The squadron was first activated as the 382nd Bombardment Squadron at Will Rogers Field, Oklahoma in March 1942 as one of the four original squadrons of the 311th Bombardment Group. The squadron moved to Georgia in July, where it trained at Hunter Field and Waycross Army Air Field for the following year. It primarily trained with Vultee V-72 Vengeance dive bombers, which had been ordered for the Royal Air Force, but which were impressed by the Army Air Forces after the United States entered World War II. Toward the end of its training, it also flew some North American A-36A Apaches. In July 1943, the squadron left the United States for the China-Burma-India Theater via Australia.

==== Combat in the China-Burma-India Theater ====
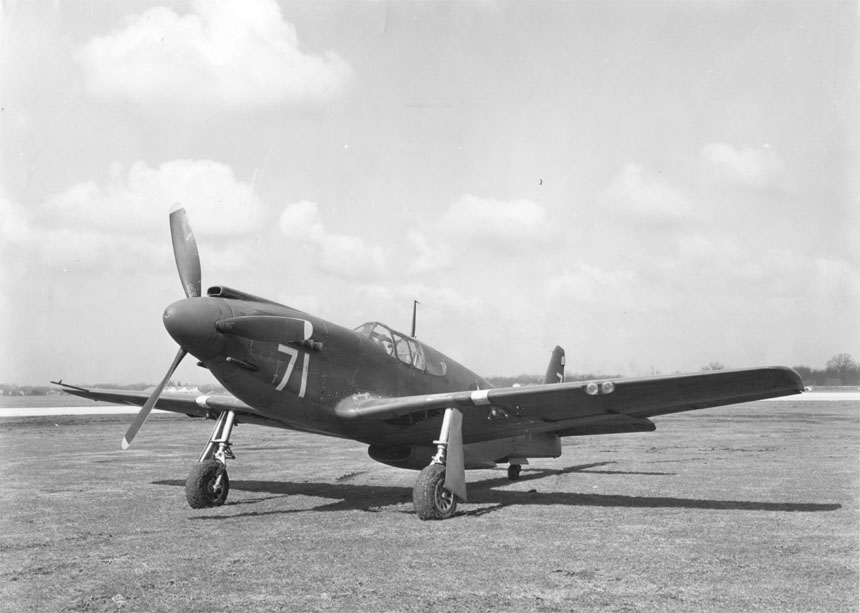
A-36 Apache as flown by the squadron

The squadron arrived at Nawadih Airfield, India in mid-September 1943 and began to equip with A-36 Apaches, converting to the fighter version, the North American P-51 Mustang by 1944. Shortly after its arrival, the AAF redesignated its single engine bomber units and the squadron became the 528th Fighter-Bomber Squadron. The squadron flew its first combat mission on 16 October. The group provided air support to Allied ground forces in Northern Burma. It provided escorts for Consolidated B-24 Liberator and North American B-25 Mitchell bombers attacking Rangoon, Insein and other targets in Burma. It bombed Japanese airfields in Myitkyina and Bhamo. It conducted patrol and reconnaissance missions to protect transport planes flying cargo over The Hump between India and China. The squadron moved to Tingkawk Sakan Airfield, Burma in July 1944. The squadron continued to support ground forces, including Merrill's Marauders. It also flew fighter sweeps over enemy airfields in central and southern Burma.

In late August 1944 the 311th Group was assigned to Fourteenth Air Force and the squadron moved to Shwangliu Airfield, China. The squadron escorted bombers, flew interception missions against attacking Japanese aircraft, struck the enemy's lines of communications, and supported ground operations. It provided fighter cover for Boeing B-29 Superfortresses returning from raids on Japan from advanced bases in China. The squadron continued combat operations until V-J day. The 528th was credited with the destruction of one enemy aircraft while operating from India and five more after moving to China. The squadron remained in China, moving to Shanghai in October. It ferried P-51s from India to equip the Chinese Air Force in November. The squadron departed China in December 1945. Upon its arrival at Fort Lawton, Washington, the Port of Embarkation, in January 1946, it was inactivated.

=== Maine Air National Guard ===
The squadron was redesignated the 132nd Fighter Squadron and allotted to the National Guard, on 24 May 1946. It was organized at Camp Keyes, Maine, and was extended federal recognition on 5 February 1947. The 132nd was equipped with Republic F-47D Thunderbolts and was initially assigned to the 67th Fighter Wing. When the 101st Fighter Group was federally recognized on 4 April 1947 the squadron was assigned to it. The squadronn soon moved to Dow Field, Maine.

==== Air defense mission ====
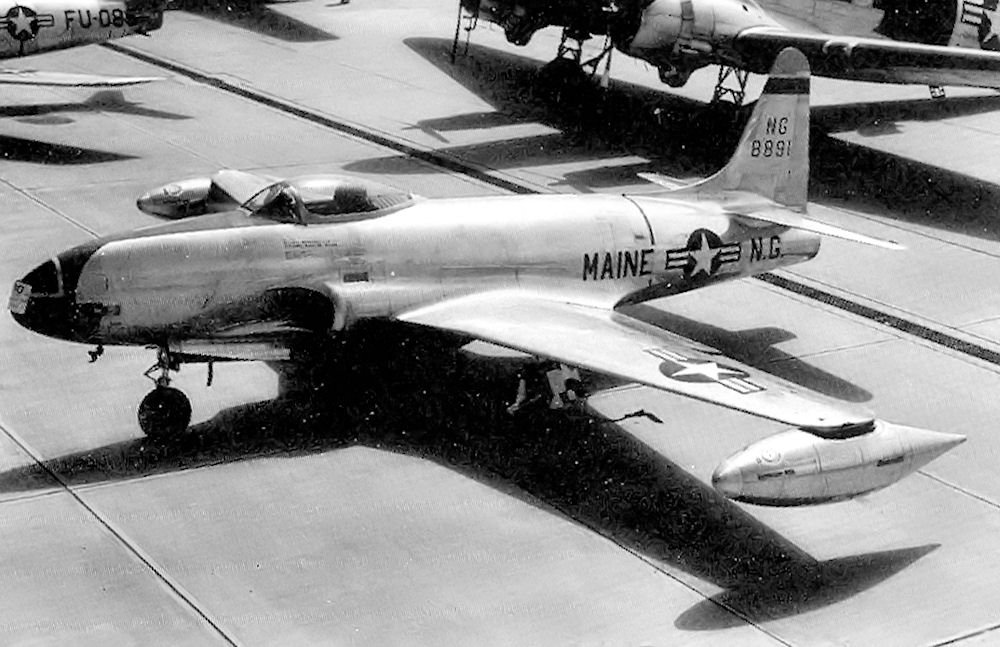
Squadron F-80C Shooting Star in 1950 (Note: Aircraft is Lockheed F-80C-1-LO Shooting Star, serial 48–891. This aircraft was written off after a takeoff accident at Eglin Air Force Base on 16 August 1951. Dirkx, Marco (18 March 2024). "1948 USAF Serial Numbers". Joe Baugher’s Serial Number List.)

The 132nd replaced their F-47 Thunderbolts with jet Lockheed F-80C Shooting Stars in the summer of 1948. The 132nd was [[mobilization]federalized]] on 10 February 1951 and redesignated the 132nd Fighter-Interceptor Squadron and its parent became the 101st Fighter-Interceptor Group. The group remained assigned to the group, however it was attached first to the 101st Fighter-Interceptor Wing, then to the 23rd Fighter-Interceptor Wing.

Air Defense Command (ADC) had difficulty under the existing wing base organizational structure in deploying fighter squadrons to the best advantage. The 23rd was inactivated on 6 February 1952 and the squadron was transferred to the recently activated 4711th Defense Wing, which replaced the 23rd Wing at Presque Isle Air Force Base. On 1 November 1952, the 132nd transferred its mission, personnel, and F-80C jets to the active-duty 49th Fighter-Interceptor Squadron, which was activated on the same day. The squadron was released from active duty and returned to the control of the State of Maine.

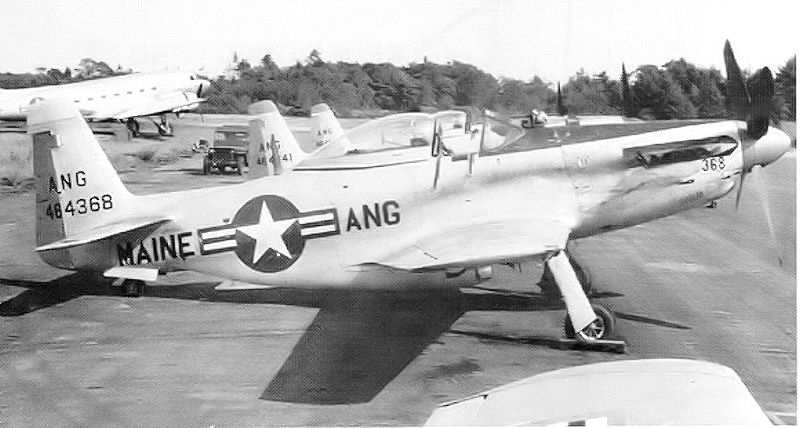
Squadron F-51H Mustang in 1953 (Note: Aircraft is North American F-51H-5-NA Mustang, serial 44-64368.)

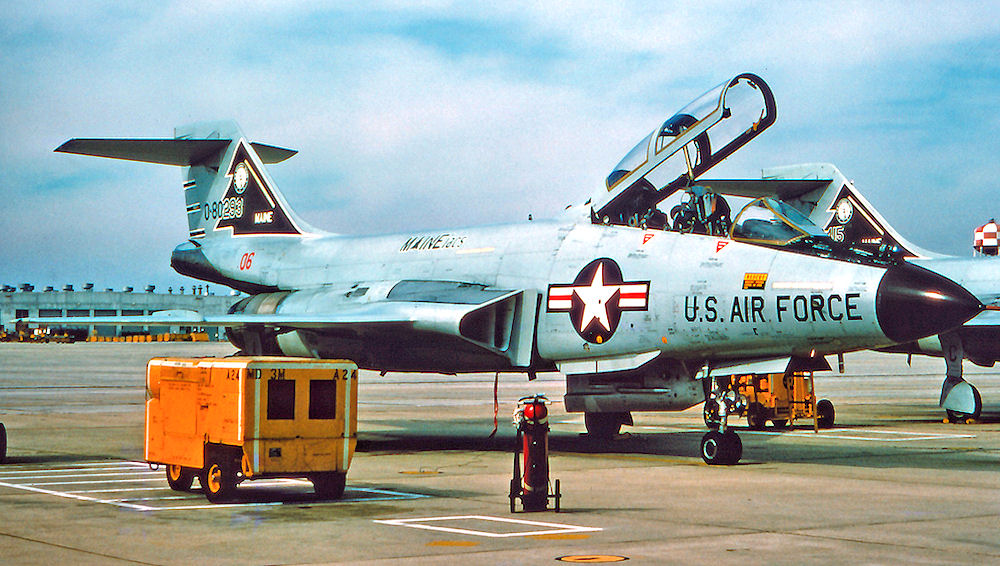
Squadron F-101B Voodoo in 1974 (Note: Aircraft is McDonnell F-101B-105-MC Voodoo, serial 58-0293. This aircraft was transferred to the Military Aircraft Storage and Disposal Center on 5 January 1976. Dirkx, Marco (6 May 2025). "1958 USAF Serial Numbers". Joe Baugher’s Serial Number List.)

Upon its return to Maine control, the 132nd was re-equipped with North American F-51H Mustang propellor driven interceptors. however, in 1954, the squadron returned to jets, equipping with Lockheed F-94A Starfires. It continued in the air defense mission for the next twenty years, upgrading its aircraft every few years as more modern interceptors were passed down from Air Defense Command as they were replaced by new active-duty aircraft. Beginning in 1955, the squadron stood 24/7/365 runway alert at Dow ready to respond to aircraft not readily identifiable by radar or pre-filed flight plans.

In 1968 Dow Air Force Base closed as a result of Air Force-wide downsizing directed by Secretary of Defense Robert McNamara. The closure was in part directed due to the desire by McNamara to reduce the size of the Air Force B-52 Stratofortress fleet, the increasing cost of the Vietnam War and the change to Intercontinental Ballistic Missiles as the primary strategic deterrence force. Most of the base was purchased by the city of Bangor, Maine and reopened the following year as Bangor International Airport. The portion of Dow that was not sold to the city became the basis for the current Air National Guard Base and the Maine Army National Guard's Army Aviation Support Facility.

In November 1969, the 132nd became one of the first Air National Guard squadrons to operate the McDonnell F-101B Voodoo.

==== Air refueling operations ====
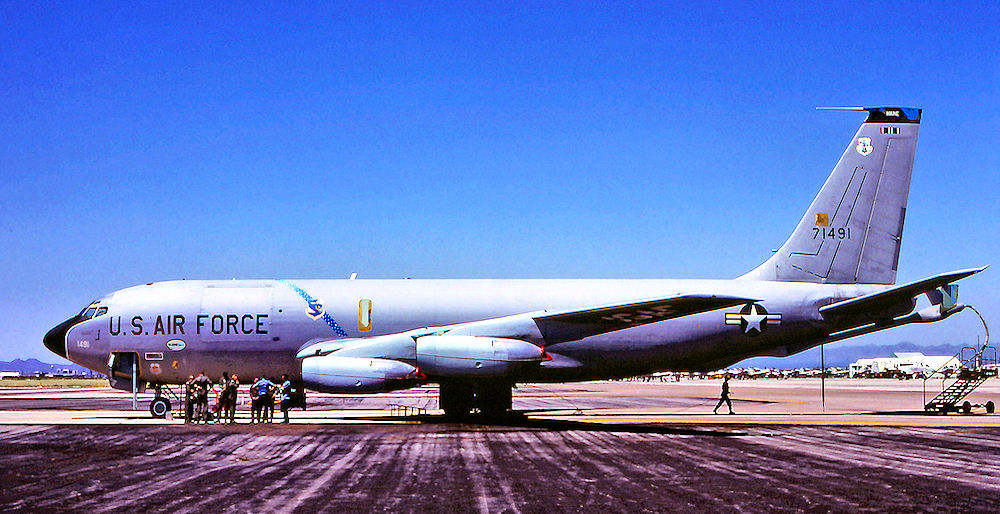
Squadron KC-135A in SAC markings about 1980 (Note: Aircraft is Boeing KC-135A-BN Stratotanker, serial 57-1491. It was later converted to KC-135E, then KC-135R configuration. It was transferred to the Aerospace Maintenance and Regeneration Center on 25 May 2008. Dirkx, Marco (23 September 2025). "1957 USAF Serial Numbers". Joe Baugher’s Serial Number List.)

On 1 July 1976, the 132nd' mobilization gaining command changed from ADC to Strategic Air Command (SAC), and it became a Boeing KC-135A Stratotanker unit as the 132nd an Air Refueling Squadron. In 1977, the 132nd deployed to RAF Mildenhall, England, as part of the European Tanker Task Force. In 1978, it began to stand alert with the SAC active force. In the fall of 1979, 16 squadron KC-135As provided air refueling support for Operation Crested Cap. This airpower exercise tested the deployment capability of Air Force fighter aircraft moving from the U.S. to Europe in support of NATO war efforts there.

During the 1980s, the squadron continued to participate in SAC exercises like Global Shield and Giant Voice. In 1984, it converted from its aging KC-135A fleet with the new fuel-efficient KC-135Es and the receipt of its first Air Force Outstanding Unit Award. The squadron engaged in routine worldwide deployments with its KC-135s.

===== 1990/1991 Gulf Crisis =====
Early on the morning of 7 August 1990, Operation Desert Shield, a build-up of friendly forces designed to contain the spread of Iraqi aggression, began. A telephone alert asked every crew member of the 132nd to provide maximum availability so that an immediate response capability could be developed. All 125 crew members stepped forward in voluntary support.

The unit began functioning on a 24-hour, seven-days-a-week basis. Numerous Desert Shield missions would be flown in the month of August as the 132nd helped refuel transport aircraft and fighters heading to the United States Air Forces Central (CENTAF) bases in the Middle East. Volunteers were placed on full active duty status for as long as needed. Close to 100 guard members reported during the next few days as additional KC-135s arrived temporary duty from other Air National Guard units, together with the 132nd's own KC-135E aircraft forming an Air National Guard tanker task force. By 1 October, the squadron's support of MAC flights in transit from the West Coast to bases in Saudi Arabia began to slow. The squadron became one of 12 National Guard units tasked with providing refueling support to Air Force units deployed to Saudi Arabia.

On 12 October the 132nd began deployment of its assets to Saudi Arabia to form the 1709th Air Refueling Wing (Provisional) at King Abdul Aziz Air Base, Jeddah. Personnel and aircraft, however, were dispersed at several locations in the Middle East, including Al Banteen Air Base, Abu Dhabi, United Arab Emirates; Morón Air Base, Spain; Cairo West Airport, Egypt; and other locations. By January 1991, the build-up of men and material in-theater was complete. Operation Desert Storm, the attack phase of the Allied plan to liberate Kuwait and destroy Iraq's army, was ready to begin. With its strategic location on the Atlantic shore, the 101st mission reverted to an "Air-Bridge" mode, refueling transiting aircraft heading across the Atlantic or inbound from RAF Mildenhall, England, which served on the other end of the transatlantic route to the Middle East.

After a short 100 hours of ground combat, Iraq's elite Republican Guard quickly collapsed and Kuwait was recaptured by Coalition ground forces. Many deployed units returning from CENTAF bases stopped at Bangor on their way to their home bases. The squadron, its aircraft festooned with yellow ribbons painted above the boom, remained in "air-bridge" mode, supporting the returning traffic. By late April almost everyone had come home safely. There had been no casualties.

===== Post Cold War era =====
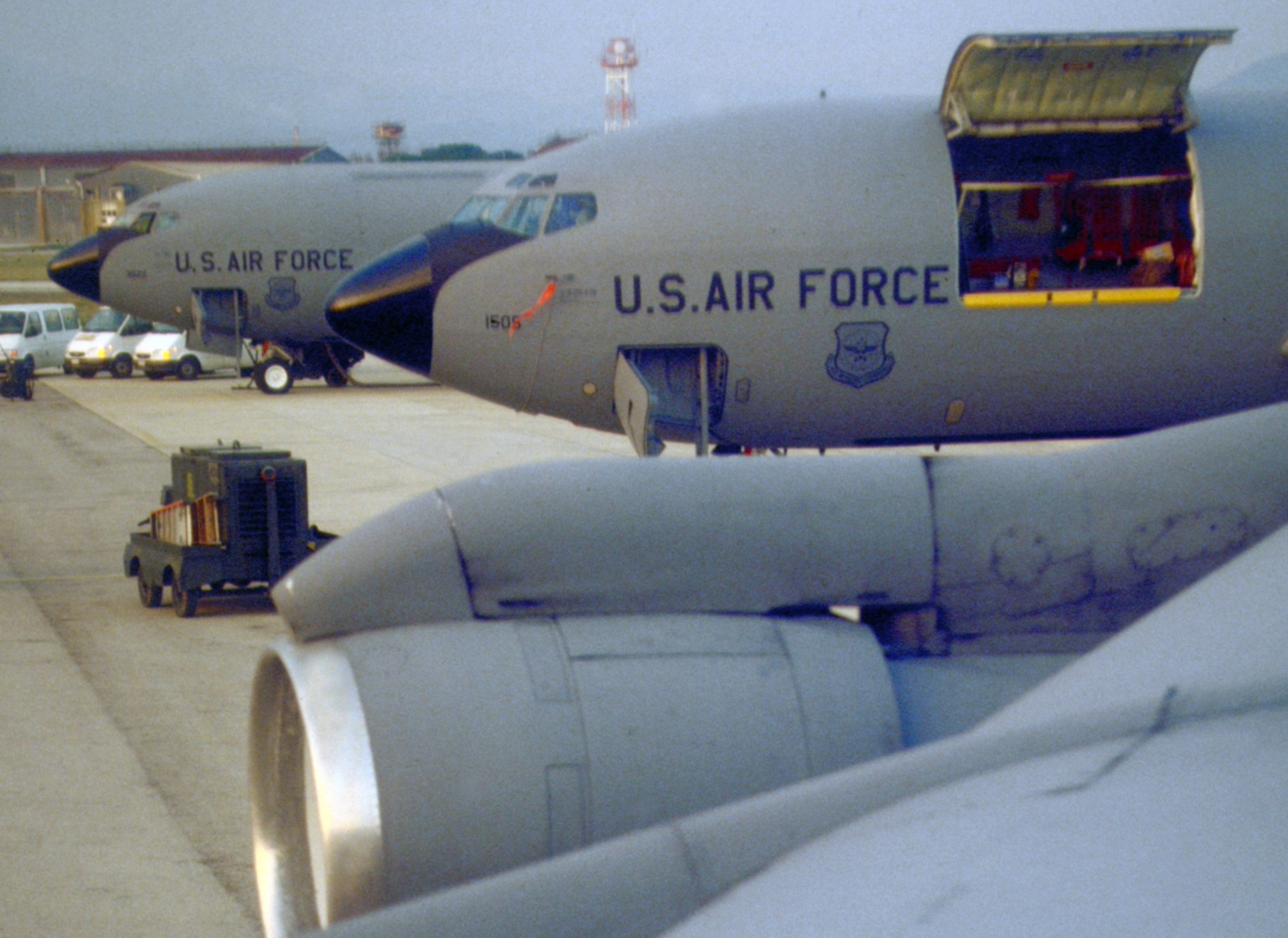
101st Wing KC-135Es at Pisa Airport, Italy in 1996

In March 1992, with the end of the Cold War, the 101st adopted the Air Force Objective Organization plan and the 132nd was assigned to the reactivated 101st Operations Group. On 30 June, SAC was inactivated as part of the Air Force reorganization after the end of the Cold War. It was replaced by Air Combat Command (ACC). In 1993, ACC transferred its KC-135 tanker force to the new Air Mobility Command.

The unit engaged in routine deployments and training until 1994 when its parent 101st Wing began operating in the Northeast Tanker Task Force together with the New Hampshire Air National Guard. The situation in Bosnia-Herzegovina and Operation Deny Flight continued to involve 132nd aircraft, crews, and support personnel.

In 2001, with the advent of the global war on terrorism, squadron KC-135s were used for air refueling aircraft flying combat air patrols over major United States Cities as part of Operation Noble Eagle. 132nd aircraft were deployed to Air Forces Central in the middle east as Air Expeditionary Units, providing refueling for combat aircraft during Operation Iraqi Freedom and Operation Enduring Freedom in Afghanistan.

In 2007, the 132nd's KC-135E-model aircraft were replaced throughout the summer with quieter, more efficient R-models. With their new CFM-56 engines, a 50 percent decrease in noise resulted, and emissions were reduced 90 percent, while range, fuel off-load capability, and reliability were all increased.

== Lineage ==
- Constituted as the 382nd Bombardment Squadron (Light) on 28 January 1942

Activated on 2 March 1942
Redesignated 382nd Bombardment Squadron (Dive) on 27 July 1942
Redesignated 528th Fighter-Bomber Squadron on 30 September 1943
Redesignated 528th Fighter Squadron, Single Engine on 30 May 1944
Inactivated on 6 Jan 1946
Redesignated 132nd Fighter Squadron, Single Engine and allotted to the National Guard on 24 May 1946
Activated on 3 February 1947
Received federal recognition on 5 February 1947
Redesignated 132nd Fighter Squadron, Jet on 1 August 1948
Federalized and ordered to active service on: 10 February 1951
Redesignated 132nd Fighter-Interceptor Squadron on 10 February 1951
Released from active duty, inactivated, and returned to Maine state control on 1 November 1952
Activated on 1 November 1952
Redesignated 132nd Air Refueling Squadron, Heavy on 1 July 1976
Federalized and ordered to active service on 12 October 1990
Released from active duty and returned to Maine state control on 31 March 1991
Redesignated 132nd Air Refueling Squadron on 16 March 1992

=== Assignments ===
- 311th Bombardment Group (later 311th Fighter-Bomber Group, 311th Fighter Group), 2 March 1942 – 6 January 1946
- 67th Fighter Wing, 4 February 1947
- 101st Fighter Group (later 101st Fighter-Interceptor Group), 4 April 1947 (attached to 101st Fighter-Interceptor Wing until 21 July 1951, 23rd Fighter-Interceptor Wing until 6 February 1952)
- 4711th Defense Wing, 6 February 1952
- 101st Fighter-Interceptor Group, 1 November 1952
- 101st Fighter-Interceptor Wing (later 101st Air Defense Wing), 1 July 1954
- 101st Fighter Group (Air Defense) (later 101st Fighter-Interceptor Group), 1 July 1960
- 101st Air Refueling Wing, 1 July 1976
- 101st Operations Group, 16 March 1992 – present

=== Stations ===
- Will Rogers Field, Oklahoma, 2 March 1942
- Hunter Field, Georgia, 4 July 1942
- Waycross Army Air Field, Georgia, 22 October 1942 – 18 July 1943
- Nawadih Airfield, India, 14 September 1943
- Dinjan Airfield, India, 11 October 1943
- Tingkawk Sakan Airfield, Burma, 6 July 1944
- Shwangliu Airfield, China, 24 August 1944 (detachments operated from Hanchung and Liangshan Airfields, China, September 1944 – January 1945 and from Hsian Airfield, China after 15 February 1945)
- Hsian Airfield, China, August 1945
- Shanghai, China, 22 October – 14 December 1945
- Fort Lawton, Washington, 5–6 January 1946
- Camp Keyes, Maine, 5 February 1947
- Dow Field (later Dow Air Force Base), Maine, 1947 – 1 November 1952
- Dow Air Force Base (later Bangor International Airport, Bangor Air National Guard Base), Maine, 1 November 1952

=== Aircraft ===
- Vultee V-72 Vengeance, 1942
- North American A-36 Apache, 1942–1944
- North American P-51 (later F-51) Mustang, 1944–1945, 1949
- Republic F-47D Thunderbolt, 1947–1948
- Lockheed F-80C Shooting Star, 1949–1952
- North American F-86F Sabre 1952–1955
- Lockheed F-94A Starfire, 1955–1957
- Northrop F-89D Scorpion, 1957–1959
- Northrop F-89J Scorpion, 1959–1969
- Convair F-102A Delta Dagger 1959
- McDonnell F-101B Voodoo 1969–1976
- Boeing KC-135A Stratotanker, 1976–1984
- Boeing KC-135E Stratotanker, 1984–2007
- BoeingKC-135R Stratotanker, 2007 – present

=== Awards and campaigns ===
Award streamer	Award	Dates	Notes
	Air Force Outstanding Unit Award	1 July 1977–30 June 1979	132nd Air Refueling Squadron
	Air Force Outstanding Unit Award	1 July 1979–30 June 1981	132nd Air Refueling Squadron
	Air Force Outstanding Unit Award	1 July 1983–30 June 1985	132nd Air Refueling Squadron
	Air Force Outstanding Unit Award	1 July 1987–30 June 1989	132nd Air Refueling Squadron
	Air Force Outstanding Unit Award	1 July 1989–30 June 1991	132nd Air Refueling Squadron
	Air Force Outstanding Unit Award	1 July 1995–30 June 1997	132nd Air Refueling Squadron
	Air Force Outstanding Unit Award	24 March 1999–10 June 1999	132nd Air Refueling Squadron
	Air Force Outstanding Unit Award	1 October 2007–30 September 2009	132nd Air Refueling Squadron

Campaign Streamer	Campaign	Dates	Notes
	India-Burma	14 September 1943–24 August 1944	382nd Bombardment Squadron (later 528th Fighter-Bomber Squadron, 528th Fighter Squadron)
	China Defensive	24 August 1944–4 May 1945	528th Fighter Squadron)
	China Offensive	5 May 1945–2 September 1945	528th Fighter Squadron)

== See also ==
- List of F-86 Sabre units
- F-89 Scorpion units of the United States Air Force
- F-94 Starfire units of the United States Air Force
