= 90th Flying Training Squadron =

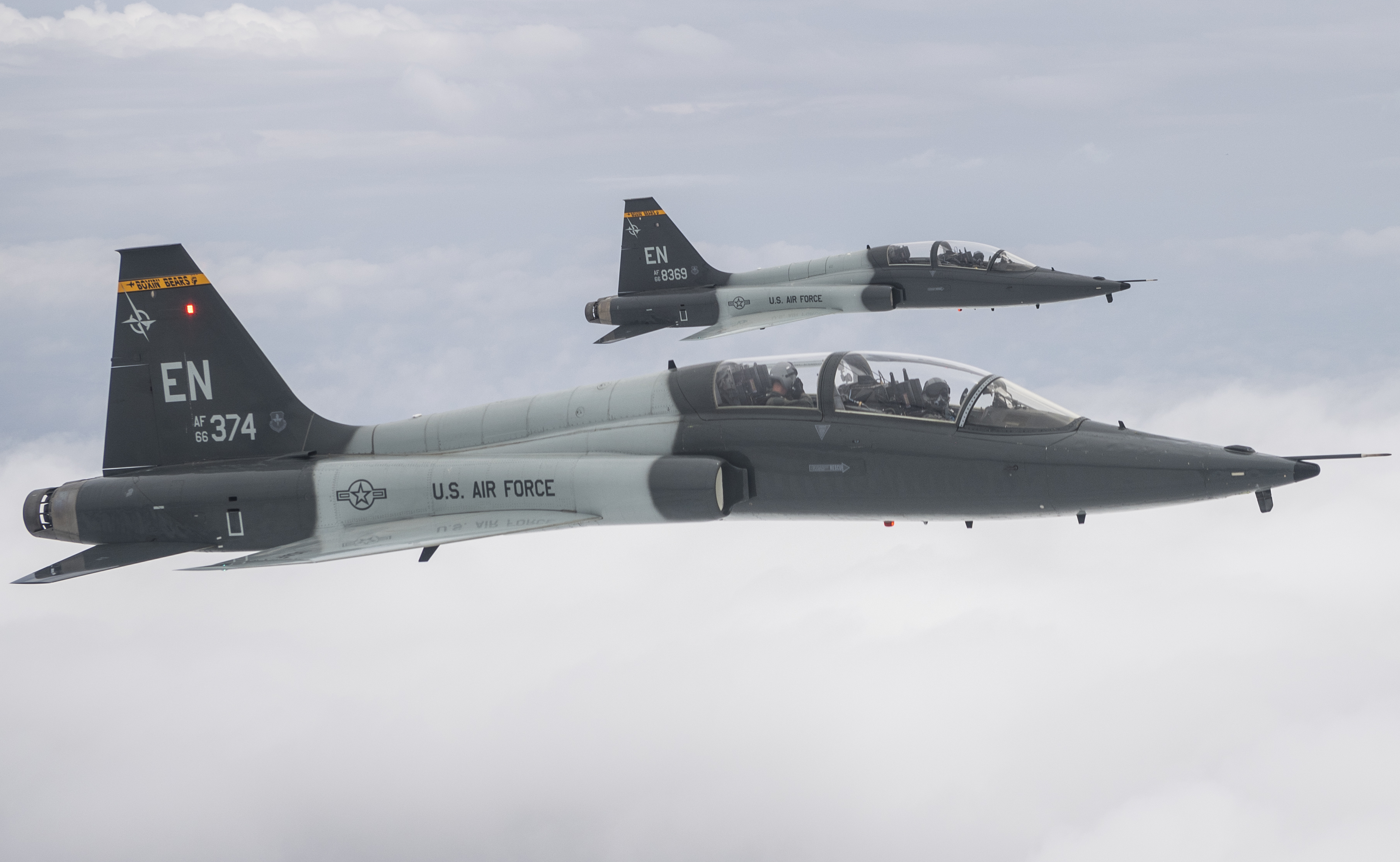
- 90th Flying Training Squadron T-38C Talons
- Active: 1942–1945; 1973–present
- Country: United States
- Branch: United States Air Force
- Role: Pilot Training
- Part of: Air Education and Training Command
- Garrison/HQ: Sheppard Air Force Base
- Nicknames: Boxin' Bears, Burma Banshees (World War II)
- Motto: Bear Down
- Engagements: China-Burma-India Theater
- Decorations: Distinguished Unit Citation; Air Force Outstanding Unit Award

Commanders
- Current commander: Lt Col Jonathan Ice

Insignia
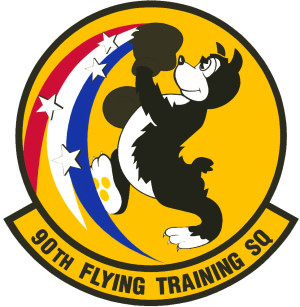
- 90th Flying Training Squadron emblem (approved 19 January 1945)

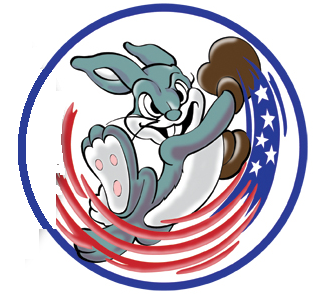
- Unofficial 90th Fighter Squadron emblem (CBI Theater

The 90th Flying Training Squadron is part of the 80th Flying Training Wing based at Sheppard Air Force Base, Texas. It operates Northrop T-38 Talon aircraft conducting flight training.

== History ==
=== World War II ===
The 90th flew combat missions in the China Burma India Theater from 16 September 1943 – 29 April 1945. While stationed at Moran, India, on 8 June 1944, the squadron again received Republic P-47 Thunderbolts. It flew its first combat mission with Thunderbolts on 25 June, having transferred its Curtiss P-40 Warhawks to the depot in Karachi or to the 88th Fighter Squadron.

=== Pilot training ===
It conducted undergraduate pilot training for US and allied students from 1973 to 1981 and has been part of the Euro-NATO Joint Pilot Training Program since October 1981.

== Lineage ==
- Constituted as the 90th Pursuit Squadron (Interceptor) on 13 January 1942

Activated on 9 February 1942
Redesignated 90th Fighter Squadron on 15 May 1942
Redesignated 90th Fighter Squadron (Single Engine) on 1 July 1942
Redesignated 90th Fighter Squadron, Single Engine on 28 February 1944
Inactivated on 3 November 1945

- Redesignated 90th Flying Training Squadron on 25 May 1972

Activated on 1 January 1973

=== Assignments ===
- 80th Fighter Group, 9 February 1942 – 3 November 1945
- 80th Flying Training Wing, 1 January 1973
- 80th Operations Group, 2 January 1998 – present)

=== Stations ===
- Selfridge Field, Michigan, 9 February 1942
- Newark Army Air Base, New Jersey, 24 June 1942
- LaGuardia Airport, New York, 27 August 1942
- Mitchel Field, New York, 27 February-30 April 1943
- Karachi, India, 28 June 1943
- Jorhat, India, c. 12 September 1943
- Moran, India, March 1944
- Tingkawk Sakan, Burma, 27 August 1944
- Myitkyina, Burma, 21 January 1945
- Moran, India, 5 May 1945
- Dudhkundi, India, 30 May-6 October 1945
- Camp Kilmer, New Jersey, 1-3 November 1945
- Sheppard Air Force Base, Texas, 1 January 1973 – present)

=== Aircraft ===
- Republic P-47 Thunderbolt (1942–1943, 1944–1945)
- Curtiss P-40 Warhawk (1943–1944)
- Northrop T-38 Talon (1973–present)
