= 88th Fighter Training Squadron =

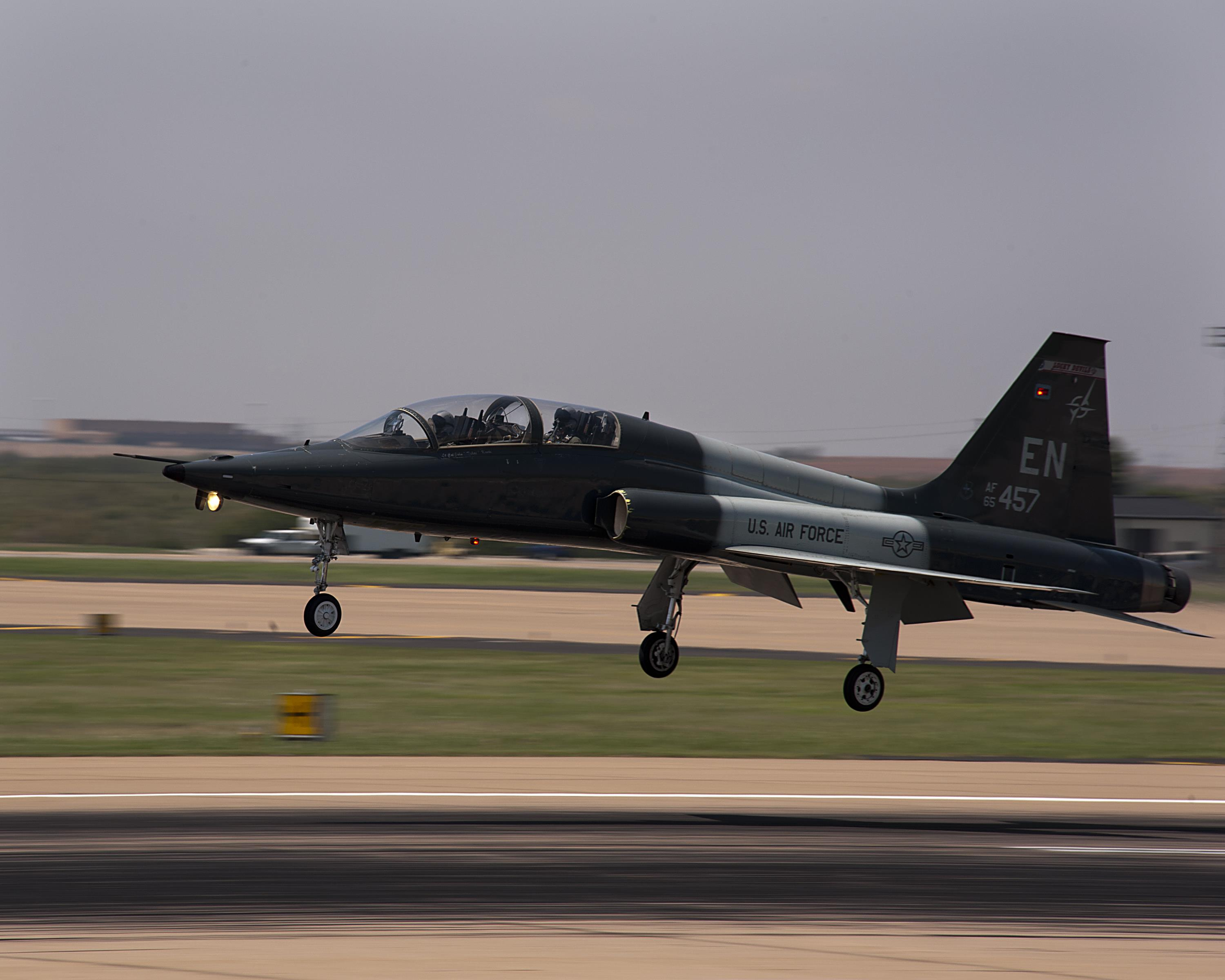
- Squadron Northrop T-38 Talon
- Active: 1942–1945; 1973-present
- Country: United States
- Branch: United States Air Force
- Role: Pilot Training
- Part of: Air Education and Training Command
- Garrison/HQ: Sheppard Air Force Base
- Engagements: China-Burma-India Theater
- Decorations: Distinguished Unit Citation; Air Force Outstanding Unit Award

Insignia
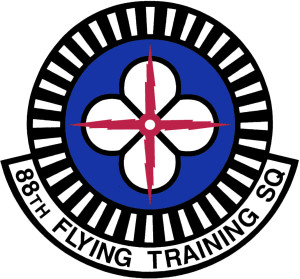
- 88th Flying Training Squadron emblem (approved 18 July 1995)

The 88th Fighter Training Squadron is part of the 80th Flying Training Wing based at Sheppard Air Force Base, Texas. It operates Northrop T-38 Talon aircraft conducting flight training.

== History ==
=== World War II ===
The 88th flew combat missions in the China Burma India Theater from, 1 October 1943 – 28 April 1945.

=== Flying training ===
It conducted undergraduate pilot training for US and allied students from, 1973–1981 and has been part of the Euro-NATO Joint Pilot Training Program since October 1981.

=== Operations ===
- World War II
- Constituted as the 88th Pursuit Squadron (Interceptor) on 13 January 1942

Activated on 9 February 1942
Redesignated 88th Fighter Squadron on 15 May 1942
Redesignated 88th Fighter Squadron (Single Engine) on 1 July 1942
Redesignated 88th Fighter Squadron, Single Engine on 28 February 1944
Inactivated on 3 November 1945

- Redesignated 88th Flying Training Squadron on 25 May 1972

Activated on 1 Jan 1973
Redesignated 88th Fighter Training Squadron' on 18 October 2007

=== Assignments ===
- 80th Fighter Group, 9 February 1942 – 3 November 1945
- 80th Flying Training Wing, 1 January 1973
- 80th Operations Group, 2 January 1988 – present

=== Stations ===
- Selfridge Field, Michigan, 9 February 1942
- Bridgeport Army Air Field, Connecticut, 25 June 1942
- Farmingdale, New York, 2 September 1942
- Mitchel Field, New York, 9 March – 30 April 1943
- Karachi, India, 28 June 1943
- Guskhara Airfield, India, c. 16 August 1943
- Nagaghuli Airfield, India, 15 October 1943
- Mokelbari, India, c. October 1943
- Shingbwiyang, Burma, 3 May 1944 (detachment operated from Myitkyina, Burma, May – 20 August 1944)
- Myitkyina, Burma, c. 23 January 1945
- Moran, India, 3 May 1945
- Dudhkundi Airfield, India, 29 May – 6 October 1945
- Camp Kilmer, New Jersey, 1 – 3 November 1945
- Sheppard Air Force Base, Texas, 1 January 1973 – present)

=== Aircraft ===
- Republic P-47 Thunderbolt (1942–1943, 1944–1945)
- Curtiss P-40 Warhawk (1943–1944)
- Cessna T-37 Tweet (1973–1993)
- Northrop T-38 Talon (1981 – present)
