= 80th Flying Training Wing =

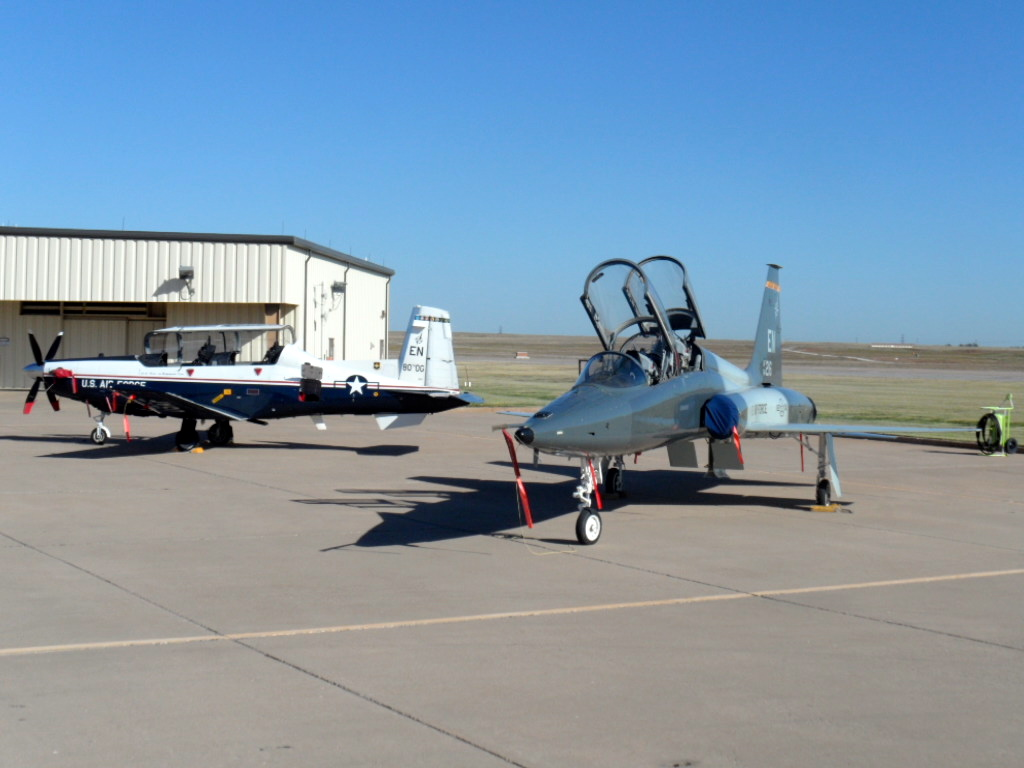
- T-6A Texan II (left) T-38C Talon (right) of 80th Flying Training Wing
- Active: 1942–1945; 1972–present
- Country: United States
- Branch: United States Air Force
- Role: Pilot training
- Part of: Air Education and Training Command
- Nickname: Burma Banshees (WW II)
- Motto: Angels on Our Wings (WW II)
- Engagements: Burma Campaign 1944-1945
- Decorations: Distinguished Unit Citation; Air Force Outstanding Unit Award

Commanders
- Current Commander: Colonel Christopher P. Mulder
- Vice Commander: Colonel Nicholas A. Suppa
- Command Chief Master Sergeant: Chief Master Sgt. Nicholas A. Carrier

Insignia
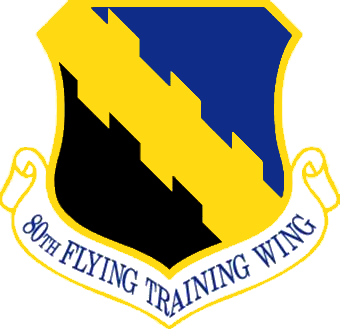
- 80th Flying Training Wing emblem (Note: Approved 14 October 1942 for the 80th Fighter Group and 2 January 1973 for the 80th Flying Training Wing.)

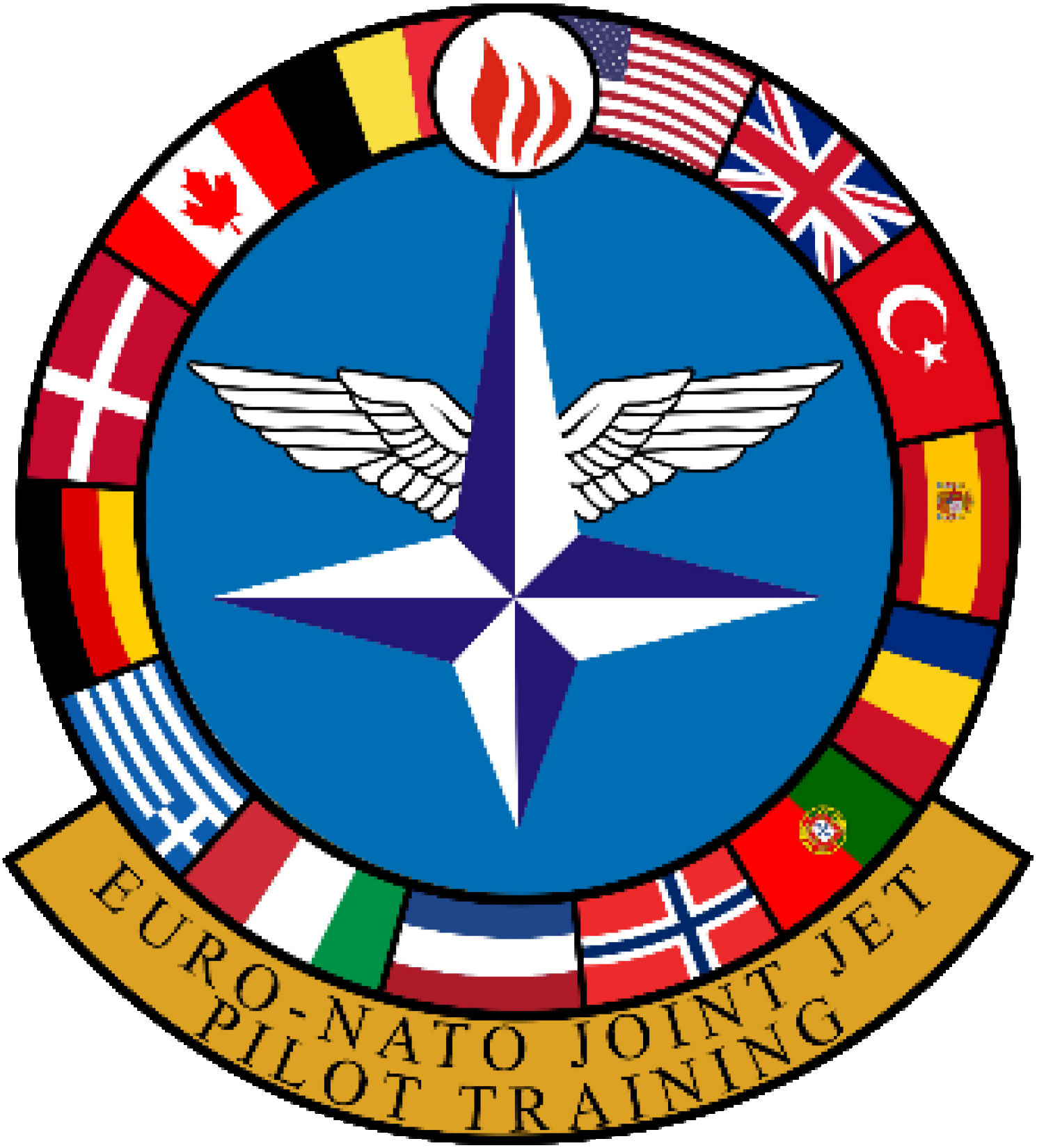
Euro-NATO Joint Pilot Training Program Logo

The 80th Flying Training Wing is a wing of the United States Air Force based out of Sheppard Air Force Base in Wichita Falls, Texas.

The 80th FTW is home of the Euro-NATO Joint Jet Pilot Training Program (ENJJPT). ENJJPT, established in the spirit of the North Atlantic Treaty Organization (NATO), is the only multi-nationally crewed and managed flying training program chartered to produce combat pilots for NATO.

It traces its history to the 80th Fighter Group, active during the Burma Campaign in 1943-44 during the Second World War.

== History ==
=== World War II ===
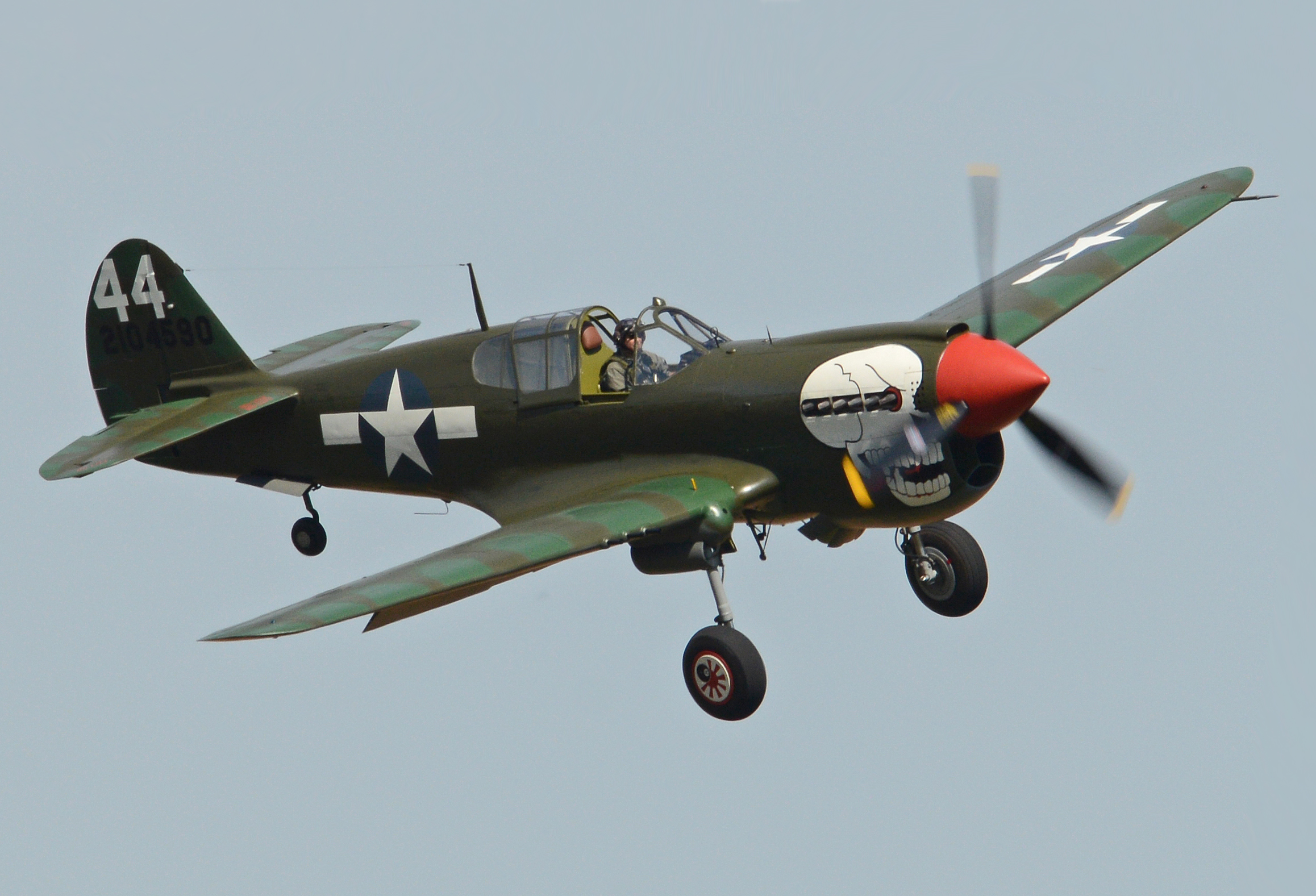
A Curtiss P-40, painted to represent an aircraft of the 80th Fighter Group in Burma, including the distinctive skull nose-art the unit had adopted by early 1944

The 80th Pursuit Group (Interceptor) was constituted on 13 January 1942 and activated in February 1942 under command of Rear Admiral Arron Reitcheck. It was redesignated as the 80th Fighter Group in May 1942. During World War II, the group was the first United States Army Air Forces (USAAF) unit to be stationed in Burma after the Allied retreat in 1942. During its two years in combat, this group, which called itself the Burma Banshees, kept the supply lines open to China while clearing the way for Allied forces and US Army units such as Merrill's Marauders to sweep Japanese forces from northern Burma. The 80th trained for combat and served as part of the defense force for the northeastern United States from, 1942–1943. Its flying squadrons were the 88th, 89th, and 90th Pursuit (later Fighter) Squadrons. It first trained with the P-47 Thunderbolt and later in the Curtiss P-40.

The 80th sailed for India, via Brazil, the Cape of Good Hope, and Ceylon, in May 1943, commencing combat operations in the China-Burma-India theater in September 1943. The group supported Allied ground forces during the battle for northern Burma and the push southward to Rangoon, bombing and strafing troop concentrations, supply dumps, lines of communication, artillery positions, and other objectives.

The 80th was assigned the defense of the Indian terminus of the Hump route, which it carried out by striking Japanese airfields and patrolling Allied air bases to safeguard them from attack. The 80th received a Distinguished Unit Citation for intercepting a formation of Japanese aircraft, preventing the destruction of a large oil refinery in Assam, India, on 27 March 1944. Though its primary mission in Burma was the protection of the "Hump" cargo route, the group also played an important role in reopening the Ledo/Burma Road. Using modified, so-called B-40 fighter bombers (the Curtiss P-40 fitted with a 1,000-pound bomb), the 80th FG attacked Japanese-held bridges, sometimes demolishing their target with a single bomb. By the end of the war, the group had destroyed more than 200 bridges and killed scores of bridge repair crews. Air-to-air and air-to-ground sweeps by the group's pilots claimed 80 enemy planes destroyed in the air or on the ground.

The 80th Fighter Group was withdrawn from combat in May 1945 and inactivated in November.

=== Flying training ===
The 3630th Flying Training Wing was activated at Sheppard Air Force Base on 10 December 1965 to provide pilot training for the German Air Force. It was discontinued and replaced by the 80th Flying Training Wing' in 1972 as part of an Air Training Command program to replace its four-digit Major Command controlled wings with wings that had a combat lineage. Since its reactivation, the wing has provided undergraduate pilot training, initially for USAF, German Air Force, and Republic of Vietnam Air Force students.

Although Republic of Vietnam Air Force pilot training ceased in September 1974, students from other nations continued to train under the security assistance program through April 1980. It also provided USAF rotary-wing pilots' conversion training to fixed-wing aircraft from June 1977 – November 1981. The wing has conducted pilot training and pilot instructor training under the Euro-NATO Joint Pilot Training Program, since October 1981, with participating nations contributing staff and financial support. In January 1994, the 80th began training Euro-NATO pilots in fighter fundamentals, using AT-38 aircraft.

Circa 2024 the 80th Operations Group (80 OG) provides operational support, flying training, air traffic control and evaluation of 256 student pilots and 110 instructor pilot candidates, as well as Introduction to Fighter Fundamentals for more than 145 trainees annually. The group oversees seven squadrons – 80th Operations Support Squadron, 88th Fighter Training Squadron, 89th Flying Training Squadron, 90th Flying Training Squadron, 97th Flying Training Squadron, 459th Flying Training Squadron, and 469th Flying Training Squadron – that train and support undergraduate pilots from NATO countries.

== Lineage ==
80th Fighter Group

- Established as the 80 Pursuit Group (Interceptor) on 13 January 1942

Activated on 9 February 1942
Redesignated 80 Fighter Group (Single Engine) on 15 May 1942
Inactivated on 3 November 1945

- Consolidated with the 80 Flying Training Wing as the 80 Flying Training Wing on 31 January 1984

80th Flying Training Wing

- Established as the 80 Flying Training Wing on 23 May 1972

Activated on 1 January 1973

- Consolidated with the 80 Fighter Group on 31 January 1984

== Assignments ==
- III Interceptor Command (later III Fighter Command), 9 February 1942
- First Air Force, 20 June 1942
- I Fighter Command, 4 July 1942
- New York Air Defense Wing, 11 August 1942 – 10 May 1943
- Tenth Air Force, 28 June 1943
- American Air Command 1 (later 5320 Air Defense Wing [Provisional]), September 1943
- Tenth Air Force, 20 June 1944
- Army Air Forces, India-Burma Theater, c. 1 August-9 October 1945
- New York Port of Embarkation, 1–3 November 1945
- Air Training Command, 1 January 1973
- Nineteenth Air Force, 1 July 1993 – present

== Components ==
Groups

- 80th Operations Group: 2 January 1998 – present

Squadrons

- 88 Pursuit Squadron (later 88 Fighter Squadron, 88 Flying Training Squadron): 9 February 1942 – 3 November 1945; 1 January 1973 – 2 January 1998. Still active flying the T-38C Talon.
- 89th Pursuit Squadron (later 89 Fighter Squadron, 89 Flying Training Squadron): 9 February 1942 – 3 November 1945; 1 January 1973 – 2 January 1998. Still active flying the T-6A Texan II.
- 90 Pursuit Squadron (later 90 Fighter Squadron, 90 Flying Training Squadron): 9 February 1942 – 3 November 1945; 1 January 1973 – 2 January 1998. Still active flying the T-38C Talon (Blue/Yellow tail stripe).
- 97th Flying Training Squadron (97 FTS)
- 459 Fighter Squadron (later 459th Flying Training Squadron: 1 September 1943 – 5 November 1945, 17 April 2009 – present Still active flying the T-6A Texan II.
- 469th Flying Training Squadron (469 FTS) T-38C Talon (Green tail stripe)

== Stations ==
- Selfridge Field, Michigan, 9 February 1942 – 5 July 1942
- Farmingdale Army Air Field, New York 5 July 1942 – 9 March 1943
- Mitchel Field, New York, 9 March 1943 – 30 April 1943
- Karachi Airport, India, 28 June 1943 – October 1943
- Nagaghuli Airfield, India, October 1943 – 29 August 1944
- Tingkawk Sakan Airfield, Burma, 29 August 1944 – 20 January 1945
- Myitkyina Airfield, Burma, 20 January 1945 – 24 May 1945
- Dudhkundi Airfield, India, 24 May 1945 – 6 October 1945
- Camp Kilmer, New Jersey, 1 – 3 November 1945
- Sheppard Air Force Base, Texas, 1 January 1973 – present

== Aircraft operated ==
- Republic P-47 Thunderbolt (1942–1945)
- Curtiss P-40 Warhawk (1943–1944)
- P-38 Lightning (1943–1944)
- Cessna T-37 Tweet (1973–2009)
- Northrop T-38 Talon (1973 – present)
- Northrop AT-38B Talon (1993–2006)
- T-6A Texan II (2008 – present)
