= 394th Combat Training Squadron =

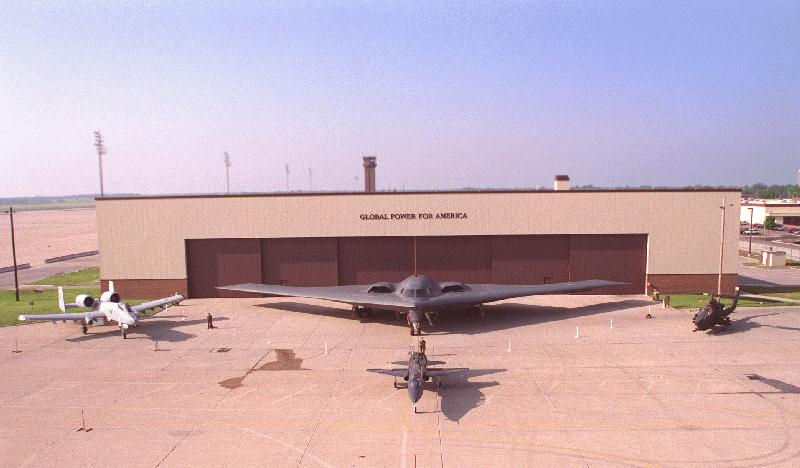
- Squadron B-2 Spirit and T-38 Talon aircraft (Note: They are flanked by an A-10 Thunderbolt of the Air Force Reserve's 442nd Fighter Wing and an AH-1 Cobra of the Missouri Army National Guard.)
- Active: 1917–1919; 1919–1946; 1996–2018
- Country: United States
- Branch: United States Air Force
- Role: Training
- Part of: Air Force Global Strike Command
- Garrison/HQ: Whiteman AFB, MO
- Engagements: Southwest Pacific Theater
- Decorations: Distinguished Unit Citation; Air Force Meritorious Unit Award; Air Force Outstanding Unit Award; Philippine Presidential Unit Citation

Commanders
- Notable commanders: Otto P. Weyland

Insignia
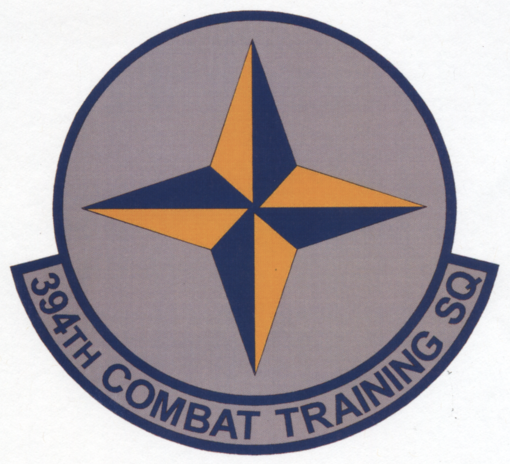
- 394th Combat Training Squadron emblem

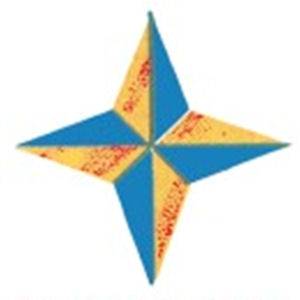
- 4th Observation Squadron emblem (Note: Approved 19 June 1931. Description: A cross estoilee divided per saltire and per cross or and azure. Significance: The half gold and half blue represent day and night observation, while the four-point figure represents the number of the organization.)

The 394th Combat Training Squadron was a United States Air Force unit assigned to the 509th Operations Group, stationed at Whiteman Air Force Base, Missouri to train Northrop Grumman B-2 Spirit aircrews. On 13 April 2018, it was inactivated and transferred its mission to the 13th Bomb Squadron.

The squadron's first predecessor is the fourth oldest squadron in the United States Air Force, organizing as the 4th Aero Squadron in early May 1917. It trained observers until January 1919, when it was demobilized.

Its second predecessor, also first named the 4th Aero Squadron was organized later in 1919. After training at fields in New York, it moved to Hawaii, where it served as an observation and reconnaisance unit between the wars. The two squadrons were consoidated as the 4th Observation Squadron in 1924. It suffered losses in the attack on Pearl Harbor in December 1941. In 1943, it moved to the Southwest Pacific Theater, engaging in combat as the 394th Bombardment Squadron and earning two Distinguished Unit Citations and a Navy Presidential Unit Citation for its actions. Following V-J Day, the squadron remained in the Philippines until early 1946, when it was iactivated. It was activated as a training squadron in 1996.

== History ==
=== World War I ===
Curtiss JN-4Ds, primary aircraft of the 4th Aero Squadron

The squadron was originally activated as the 4th Aero Squadron on 5 May 1917 during World War I at Fort Sam Houston Texas. but within a month was transferred to the South San Antonio Aviation Camp. The unit remained there until 24 September 1917 when it transferred to Post Field, on Fort Sill, Oklahoma.z During World War I, the 4th operated as an observer training unit for the Army field artillery training school at Fort Sill. In July 1918, the United States Army Air Service reorganized training activities at Post and the unit was redesignated Squadron B, Post Field. The squadron's pilots began flying the Curtiss R-4, the Curtiss JN-4, and Curtiss JN-6. The unit remained in Oklahoma until 2 January 1919 the unit was demobilized. when all flying squadrons at Post were consolidated into the Flying School Detachment, Post Field.

=== Inter-War period ===
Dayton-Wright DH-4 as flown by the squadron from 1919 to 1929

After World War I the second predecessor of the unit, also named the 4th Aero Squadron was activated at Hazelhurst Field, New York, on 23 June 1919 and after training in New York moved to its permanent station in Hawaii on 8 January 1920 as part of the 5th Group (Composite). In March 1921, the unit became the 4th Squadron (Observation). Less than two years later, in January 1923, the Air Service renamed it the 4th Observation Squadron. During this period, the squadron began construction of Wheeler Field. Within a month, the group had completed the landing strip. From 1922 to 1927, the squadron was removed from the control of the 5th Group, serving under the Hawaiian Division Air Service at Schofield Barracks. In 1926, the 4th sowed seeds from the air for the Territorial Forestry Division.

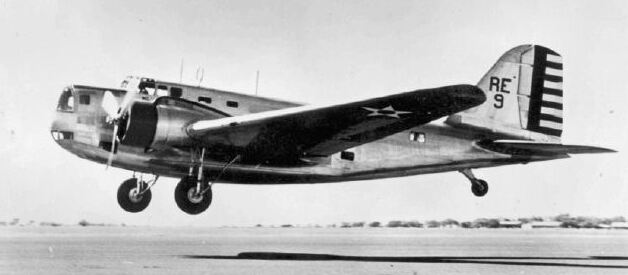
4th Reconnaissance Squadron B-18 Bolo

In 1927, the squadron returned to Luke Field and the 5th Composite Group. Two years later, it replaced its World War I era Dayton-Wright DH-4s with Thomas-Morse O-19 observation planes and Loening OA-1 amphibians. In 1935, Air Corps observation squadrons performing long range aerial reconnaissance were renamed, and the squadron became the 4th Reconnaissance Squadron. The squadron received new aircraft to accompany its new name. In 1938, the squadron began operating with the Douglas B-18 Bolo medium bomber. In 1938, the 5th Composite Group became the 5th Bombardment Group, and the squadron was relieved from assignment to the group, However, each bombardment group would have a long range reconnaissance squadron attached to it, the 4th was attached to the 5th Group.

=== World War II ===
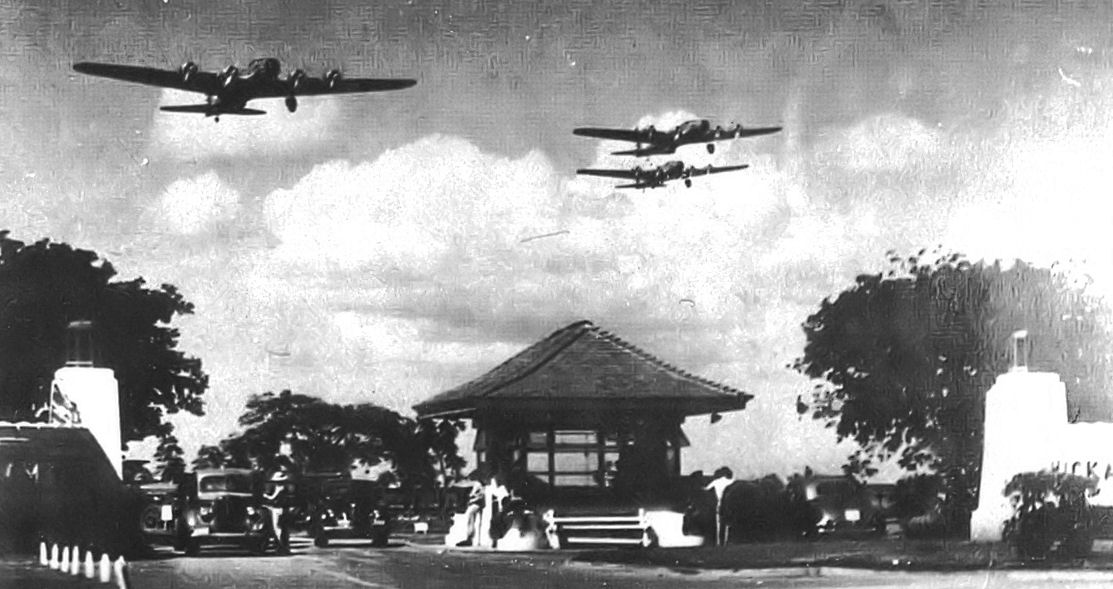
B-17s at Hickam Field in 1941

In late 1941, the squadron began replacing its B-18s with Boeing B-17 Flying Fortress aircraft. When the Japanese attacked military installations on the island of Oahu on 7 December 1941, the squadron suffered three killed in action and six wounded at Hickam Field. (Note: Coincidentally, Lieutenant George Allison Whiteman was killed at Bellows Field in this attack. The squadron's base from 1996 to 2018 was dedicated to his memory. Brief History of the 394th CTS.) Until December 1942, the squadron responded by patrolling the area around Hawaii to guard against another attack. In April 1942, the squadron, along with other reconnaissance squadrons operating the same medium and heavy bombers as the group they were attached to, were redesignated as bombardment squadrons and assigned to the groups. The squadron became the 394th Bombardment Squadron in this reorganization. The unit also had several Consolidated LB-30 Liberators assigned at this time. During 1942, the squadron also acted as a training unit for B-17 crews arriving in the Pacific.

B-24 in the South Pacific

The squadron left Hawaii in November 1942 and operated in the South Pacific Theater. It converted to long-range Consolidated B-24 Liberators in 1943. The squadron flew long patrol and reconnaissance missions over the Solomon Islands and the Coral Sea. It attacked Japanese shipping off Guadalcanal, and raided airfields in the northern Solomons until August 1943. It then struck enemy bases and installations on Bougainville Island, New Britain, and New Ireland.

The squadron raided the heavily defended Japanese base on Woleai between mid-April and mid-May 1944, receiving a Distinguished Unit Citation 9dUC) for the action. It helped to neutralize enemy bases on Yap and in the Truk and Palau Islands in June through August 1944, preparatory to the invasion of Peleliu and Leyte. The 394th flew missions to the Netherlands East Indies. On 30 September 1944, it attacked oil facilities at Balikpapan, which were heavily defended by flak and fighters. It was awarded a second DUC for this action.

From October 1944 until the end of the war, it conducted raids on enemy bases and installations on Luzon, Ceram, Halmahera, and Formosa. It supported ground forces in the Philippines and Borneo and conducted patrols off the China coast. The squadron moved to Clark Field, Philippines in December 1945. Although all personnel had been withdrawn from the squadron in early 1946, it was not inactivated ntil 29 April 1946.

=== Combat Training ===
In the fall of 1996, the Air Force redesignated the squadron as the 394th Combat Training Squadron. On 7 November 1996, the squadron was activated at Whiteman Air Force Base, Missouri, as part of the 509th Operations Group of the 509th Bomb Wing. The 394th Squadron provided the 509th Wing with qualified, mission-ready Northrop Grumman B-2 Spirit and Northrop T-38 Talon pilots to support worldwide Joint Chiefs of Staff taskings until its inactivation in 2018. The 394th was also responsible for implementing all B-2 and T-38 formal training courses. The unit supervised and oversaw all T-38 operations and performed quality assurance for all maintenance and aircrew training devices, including weapon system trainers.

Squadron aircrews participated in Operation Allied Force from 23 March through 22 May 1999, sending aircrews and aircraft almost nightly to end the strife in Kosovo. Its crews participated in Operation Enduring Freedom by flying the first of a series of long duration missions, departing Whiteman on 7 October 2001, bombing targets in Afghanistan, and landing at a forward location following missions more than 40 hours. Following crew changes, the planes returned to Whiteman on 9 October. The sorties were the longest combat sortie in the history of the Air Force to date.

The 394th was inactivated in April 2018. Its mission and responsibilities were transferred to the 13th Bomb Squadron.

== Lineage ==
Squadron B, Post Field

- Organized as the 4th Aero Squadron on 5 May 1917

Redesignated Squadron B, Post Field on 22 July 1918
Demobilized on 2 January 1919
Reconstituted and consolidated with the 4th Aero Squadron on 8 April 1924

394th Combat Training Squadron
Organized as the 4th Aero Squadron on 23 June 1919
Redesignated 4th Squadron (Observation) on 14 March 1921
Redesignated 4th Observation Squadron on 25 January 1923
Consolidated with Squadron B, Post Field on 8 April 1924
Redesignated 4th Reconnaissance Squadron on 25 January 1938
Redesignated 4th Reconnaissance Squadron (Medium Range) on 6 December 1939
Redesignated 4th Reconnaissance Squadron (Heavy) on 20 November 1940
Redesignated 394th Bombardment Squadron (Heavy) on 22 April 1942
Redesignated 394th Bombardment Squadron, Heavy by September 1944
Inactivated on 29 April 1946
Redesignated 394th Combat Training Squadron on 22 October 1996
Activated on 6 November 1996
Inactivated c. 13 April 2018

=== Assignments ===
- Unknown (probably Post Headquarters at each station), 5 May 1917 – 2 January 1919
- Eastern Department, 23 June 1919
- 2d Group (Observation) (later 5th Group (Observation)), 15 December 1919 (Note: The factsheet calls tis unit the "2 (later 5) Observation Group", but see Maurer, Combat Units, p. 38 for correct group designation during this period.) (attached to the Eastern Department until 8 January 1920)
- Hawaiian Department, 31 January 1922
- Hawaiian Division Air Service, 6 February 1922
- 5th Composite Group (later 5th Bombardment) Group, assigned 11 January 1927
- Probably 18th Wing (later 18th Bombardment Wing) (attached to 5th Bombardment Group) 12 October 1938
- 5th Bombardment Group, 25 February 1942 – 29 April 1946
- 509th Operations Group, 6 November 1996 – c. 13 April 2018

Stations

=== Stations ===
- Fort Sam Houston, Texas, 5 May 1917
- South San Antonio Aviation Camp (later Kelly Field), Texas, May 1917
- Fort Sill, Oklahoma, 24 September 1917
- Post Field, Oklahoma, November 1917 – 2 January 1919
- Hazelhurst Field, New York, 23 June 1919
- Mitchel Field, New York, November 1919 – 8 January 1920
- Luke Field, Hawaii, 24 January 1920
- Schofield Barracks, Hawaii, 6 February 1922
- Luke Field, Hawaii, 11 January 1927
- Hickam Field, Hawaii, 1 January 1939
- Bellows Field, Hawaii, c. 30 May 1942
- Hickam Field, Hawaii, 24 July 1942
- Bellows Field, Hawaii, 28 September-17 November 1942
- Nadi Airfield, Viti Levu, Fiji Islands, 25 December 1942 (operated from Palikulo Bay Airfield, Espiritu Santo, New Hebrides and Henderson Field, Guadalcanal, Solomon Islands, 3–19 January 1943, and 25 April – 5 June 1943)
- Henderson Field, Guadalcanal, Solomon Islands, c. 28 June 1943 (operated from Munda Airfield, New Georgia, Solomon Islands, c.28 February – 9 April 1944)
- Momote Airfield, Los Negros, Admiralty Islands, 13 April 1944
- Wakde Airfield, Netherlands East Indies, c.25 August 1944
- Kornasoren (Yebrurro) Airfield, Noemfoor, Schouten Islands, c.27 September 1944
- Wama Airfield, Morotai, Netherlands East Indies, 1 November 1944
- Guiuan Airfield, Samar, Philippines, c.2 March 1945
- Clark Field, Luzon, Philippines, December 1945 – 29 April 1946
- Whiteman Air Force Base, Missouri, 6 November 1996 – c. 13 April 2018

=== Aircraft ===
- Apparently Curtiss Model R-4, 1917–1919
- Apparently Curtiss JN-4, 1917–1919
- Apparently Curtiss JN-6, 1917–1919
- Primarily Dayton-Wright DH-4, 1919–1929
- Thomas-Morse O-19 and Loening OA-1, (also included Martin B-12 bomber and Boeing P-12 fighter), 1929–1937
- Primarily Douglas B-18 Bolo, 1938–1941
- Boeing B-17 Flying Fortress, 1941–1943
- Consolidated LB-30 Liberator, 1942
- Consolidated B-24 Liberator, 1943–1945
- Northrop T-38 Talon, 1996–2018
- Northrop Grumman B-2 Spirit, 1996–2018

=== Awards and campaigns ===
Award streamer	Award	Dates	Notes
	Navy Presidential Unit Citation	1942	4th Reconnaissance Squadron (later 394th Bombardment Squadron)
	Distinguished Unit Citation	18 April 1944–15 May 1944	Woleai Island, 394th Bombardment Squadron
	Distinguished Unit Citation	30 September 1944	Borneo, 394th Bombardment Squadron
	Air Force Meritorious Unit Award	1 June 2005–31 May 2007	394th Combat Training Squadron
	Air Force Meritorious Unit Award	1 June 20→07–31 May 2008	394th Combat Training Squadron
	Air Force Meritorious Unit Award	1 June 2008–31 May 2009	394th Combat Training Squadron
	Air Force Meritorious Unit Award	1 June 2009–31 May 2010	394th Combat Training Squadron
	Air Force Meritorious Unit Award	1 June 2010–31 May 2011	394th Combat Training Squadron
	Air Force Meritorious Unit Award	1 January 2013–31 December 2013	394th Combat Training Squadron
	Air Force Outstanding Unit Award	1 June 1995–31 May 1997	394th Combat Training Squadron
	Air Force Outstanding Unit Award	1 June 1997–31 May 1999	394th Combat Training Squadron
	Air Force Outstanding Unit Award	1 June 1999–31 May 2001	394th Combat Training Squadron
	Air Force Outstanding Unit Award	1 June 2003–31 May 2005	394th Combat Training Squadron
	Philippine Republic Presidential Unit Citation	17 October 1944–4 July 1945	394th Bombardment Squadron

Campaign Streamer	Campaign	Dates	Notes
	Central Pacific	7 December 1941–5 June 1943	4th Reconnaissance Squadron (later 394th Bombardment Squadron)
	Guadalcanal	3 January 1943–21 February 1943	394th Bombardment Squadron)
	New Guinea	24 January 1943–31 December 1944	394th Bombardment Squadron)
	Northern Solomons	23 February 1943–21 November 1944	394th Bombardment Squadron)
	Air Combat, Asiatic–Pacific Theater	5 June 1943–29 April 1946	394th Bombardment Squadron)
	Bismarck Archipelago	15 December 1943–27 November 1944	394th Bombardment Squadron)
	Leyte	17 October 1944–1 July 1945	394th Bombardment Squadron)
	Luzon	15 December 1944–4 July 1945	394th Bombardment Squadron)
	Southern Philippines	27 February 1945–4 July 1945	394th Bombardment Squadron)
	Western Pacific	17 April 1945–2 September 1945	394th Bombardment Squadron)
	China Offensive	5 May 1945–2 September 1945	394th Bombardment Squadron)

== See also ==
- List of American aero squadrons
- List of United States Air Force training squadrons
- B-17 Flying Fortress units of the United States Army Air Forces
- Gene Roddenberry
- B-24 Liberator units of the United States Army Air Forces
