= 459th Flying Training Squadron =

459th Flying Training Squadron

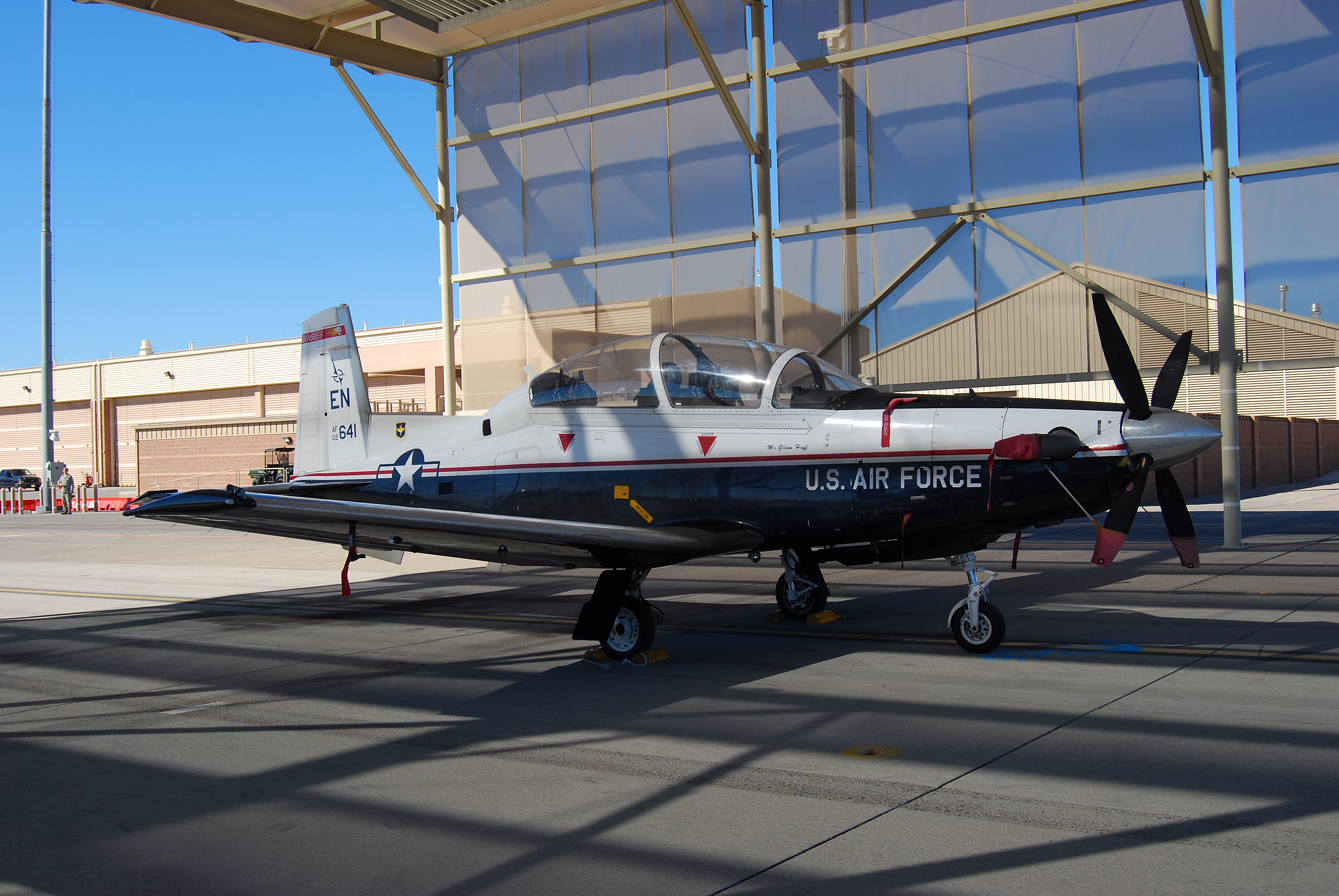
- T-6 Texan II of the 80th Flying Training Wing
- Active: 1943–1945; 2009–present
- Country: United States
- Branch: United States Air Force
- Role: flying training
- Part of: Air Education and Training Command
- Garrison/HQ: Sheppard Air Force Base
- Nickname: Twin Dragons
- Engagements: China-Burma-India Theater
- Decorations: Distinguished Unit Citation; Air Force Outstanding Unit Award

Insignia
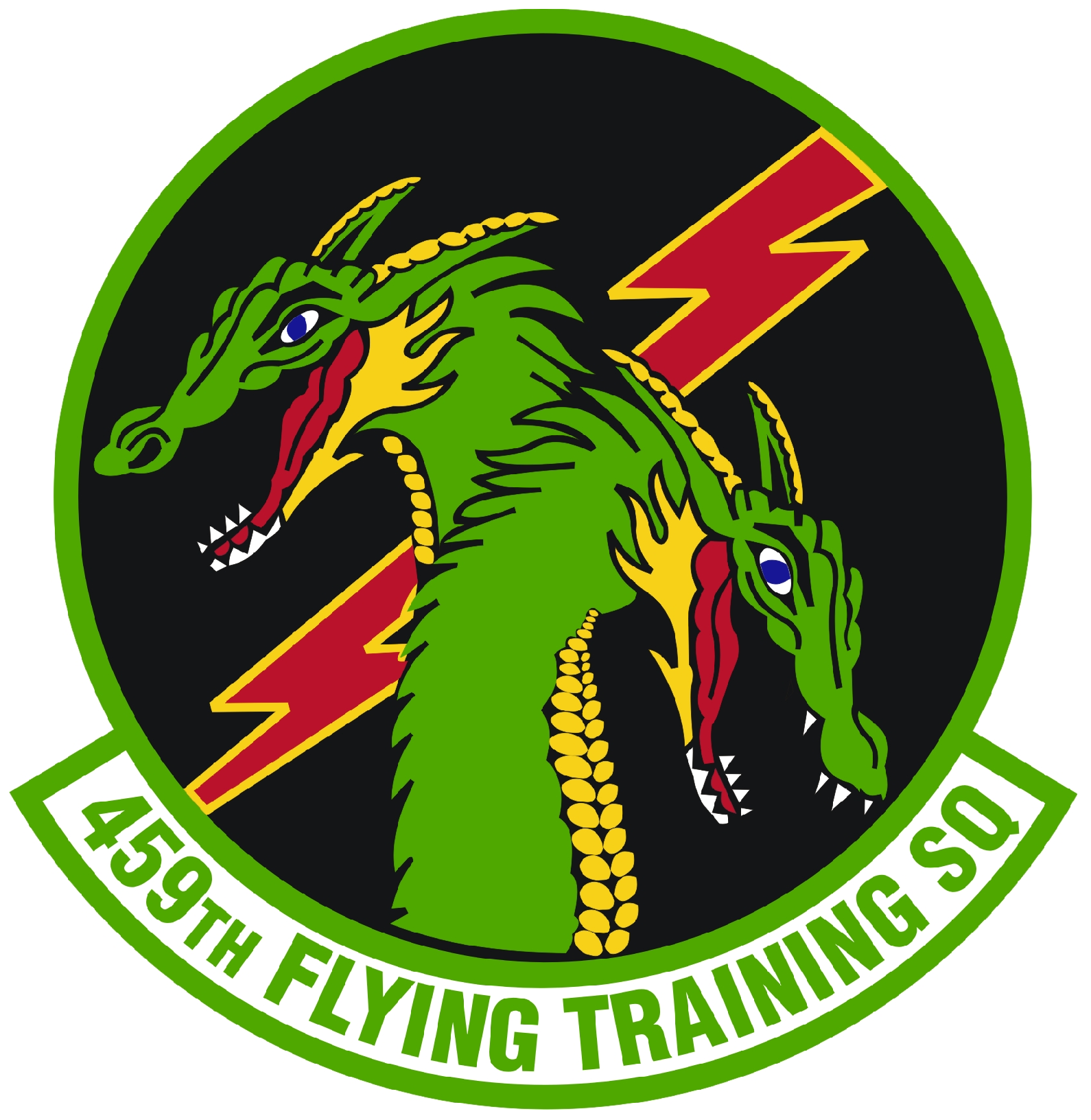
- 459th Flying Training Sq emblem (approved 13 April 2009)

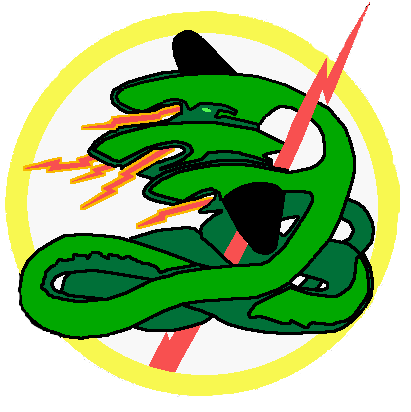
- 459th Fighter Squadron emblem (approved 28 November 1944)

The 459th Flying Training Squadron is a United States Air Force squadron tasked with providing undergraduate flying training for Euro-NATO joint jet pilot candidates. Based at Sheppard Air Force Base in Texas, the unit draws its lineage from a fighter squadron that served in the China-Burma-India Theater during World War II, where it saw service against the Japanese. The squadron currently consists of instructors from seven different NATO countries.

== History ==
=== World War II ===
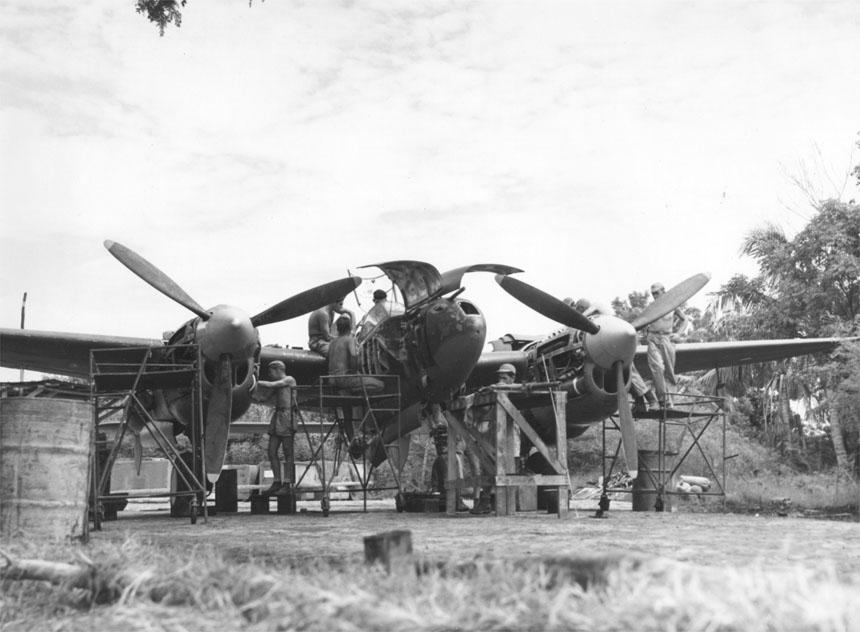
Repairs to P-38 by 459th Fighter Squadron at Chittagong, India – January 1945

The squadron was activated in August 1943 with Lockheed P-38 Lightnings and joined the 80th Fighter Group, whose three squadrons of Curtiss P-40 Warhawks had arrived in India in June. The group completed the China-Burma-India Theater training and entered combat in September.

It supported Allied forces during the battles for northern Burma and the advance toward Rangoon bombing and strafing troop concentrations, supply dumps and lines of communications. The squadron helped protect bases in India from which cargo aircraft of Air Transport Command flew missions over the Hump to supply forces in China. It patrolled allied airfields and attacked Japanese airfields from which enemy interceptors operated. The 459th was awarded a Distinguished Unit Citation (DUC) for destroying 119 enemy aircraft between 11 March and 19 May 1944.

The 459th Received a second DUC for intercepting a large formation of enemy aircraft while defending an allied oil refinery in Assam, India on 27 March 1944. The squadron was credited with 66 aerial victory credits between 1 December 1943 and 13 January 1945. The first victory was earned by Capt. Hampton Boggs, who went on to become one of the squadron's aces. The unit continued in combat until about 6 May 1945. Shortly thereafter, it was transferred to the 33d Fighter Group, returning with the 33d to the United States, where it was inactivated at the New York Port of Embarkation on 5 November 1945.

=== Flying training ===
The squadron was activated again at Sheppard Air Force Base, Texas in April 2009 as the 459th Flying Training Squadron. The 89th Flying Training Squadron, which was conducting training with the Beechcraft T-6 Texan II at Sheppard and had grown to over twice the size of a normal training squadron, was split to form the 459th.

The 459th conducts undergraduate flying training for Euro-NATO joint jet pilot candidates. Its instructor pilots come from seven countries. (Note: The countries are the United States, Germany, the Netherlands, Norway, Canada, Turkey and Spain. Johnson.) In 2010, it was named top operations squadron in Air Education and Training Command.

== Lineage ==
- Constituted as the 459 Fighter Squadron (Two Engine) on 2 August 1943

Activated on 1 September 1943
Inactivated on 5 November 1945

- Redesignated 459 Flying Training Squadron on 25 February 2009

Activated on 17 April 2009

=== Assignments ===
- 80th Fighter Group, 1 September 1943
- 33d Fighter Group, 12 May – 5 November 1945
- 80th Operations Group, 17 April 2009 – present

=== Stations ===
- Karachi, India (now Pakistan), 1 September 1943
- Kurmitola Airfield, India (now Bangladesh), 5 November 1943
- Chittagong Airport, India (now Bangladesh), 4 March 1944
- Rumkhapalong, India, 1 February 1945
- Dudhkundi Airfield, India, 11 May – 8 October 1945
- Camp Kilmer, New Jersey, 3 – 5 November 1945
- Sheppard Air Force Base, Texas, 17 April 2009 – present

=== Aircraft ===
- Lockheed P-38 Lightning, 1943–1945
- Beechcraft T-6 Texan II, 2009–present

=== Awards and campaigns ===
Award streamer	Award	Dates	Notes
	Distinguished Unit Citation	11 March–19 May 1944 India-Burma	459th Fighter Squadron
	Distinguished Unit Citation	27 March 1944 Assam	459th Fighter Squadron
	Air Force Outstanding Unit Award	1 July 2010–30 June 2012	459th Flying Training Squadron

Campaign Streamer	Campaign	Dates	Notes
	India-Burma	1 September 1943 – 28 January 1945	459th Fighter Squadron
	Central Burma	29 January 1945 – 15 July 1945	459th Fighter Squadron

== See also ==
- List of Lockheed P-38 Lightning operators
