= 89th Flying Training Squadron =

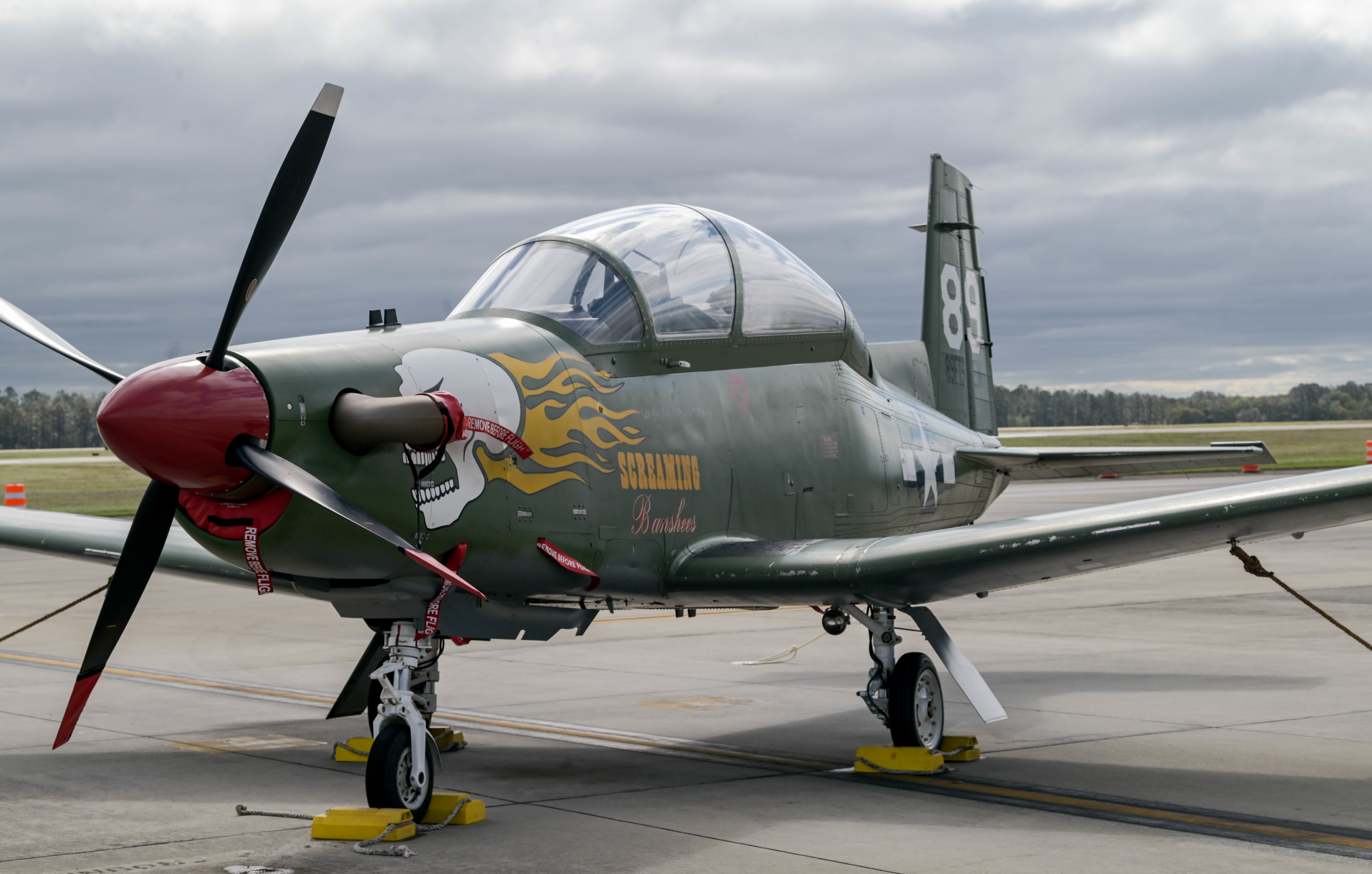
- 89th Flying Training Squadron T-6 Texan II at Moody Air Force Base
- Active: 1942-1945; 1973-present
- Country: United States
- Branch: United States Air Force
- Role: Pilot Training
- Part of: Air Education and Training Command
- Garrison/HQ: Sheppard Air Force Base
- Decorations: Distinguished Unit Citation; Air Force Outstanding Unit Award

Insignia
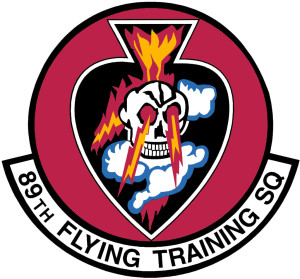
- 89th Flying Training Squadron emblem (approved 18 July 1995) (Note: The emblem was modified to place the approved emblem on a disc to comply with USAF regulations. Air Force Instruction 84-105, Organizational Lineage, Honors and Heraldry.)

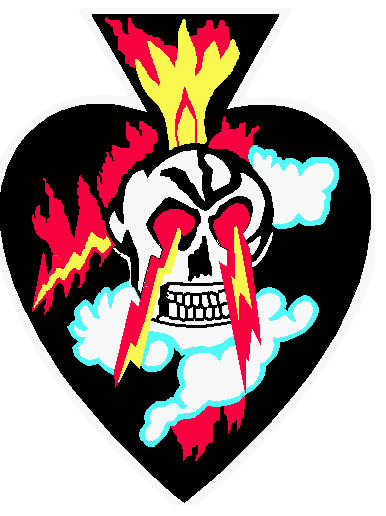
- 89th Fighter Squadron emblem (approved 5 June 1944)
- Tail Code: EN

The 89th Flying Training Squadron is part of the 80th Flying Training Wing based at Sheppard Air Force Base, Texas. It operates the T-6 Texan II aircraft conducting flight training.

== History ==
=== World War II ===
The 89th flew combat missions in the China Burma India Theater from, 8 September 1943 – 28 April 1945.

=== Pilot Training ===
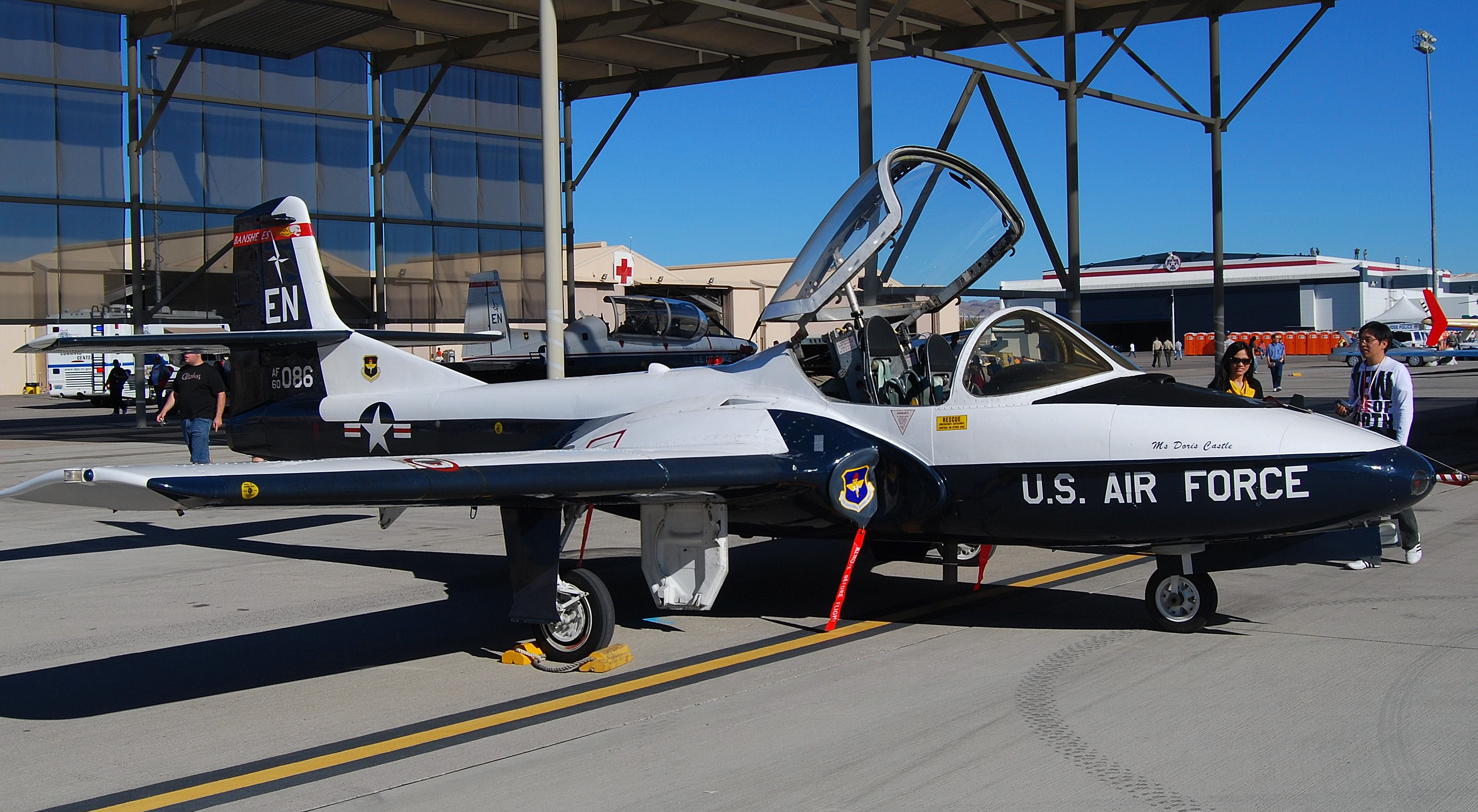
Squadron Cessna T-37

It conducted undergraduate pilot training for US and allied students from, 1973–1981 and has been part of the Euro-NATO Joint Pilot Training Program since October 1981.

=== Operations ===
- World War II

== Lineage ==
- Constituted as the 89th Pursuit Squadron (Interceptor) on 13 January 1942

Activated on 9 February 1942
Redesignated 89th Fighter Squadron on 15 May 1942
Redesignated 89th Fighter Squadron (Single Engine) on 1 July 1942
Redesignated 89th Fighter Squadron, Single Engine on 28 February 1944
Inactivated on 3 November 1945

- Redesignated 89th Flying Training Squadron on 25 May 1972

Activated on 1 Jan 1973

=== Assignments ===
- 80th Fighter Group, 9 February 1942 – 3 November 1945
- 80th Flying Training Wing, 1 January 1973
- 80th Operations Group, 2 January 1988 – present

=== Stations ===
- Selfridge Field, Michigan, 9 February 1942
- Farmingdale, New York, 23 June 1942
- Mitchel Field, New York, 9 December 1942 – 30 April 1943
- Karachi, India, 29 June 1943
- Guskhara Airfield, India, c. 16 August 1943
- Nagaghuli Airfield, India, 15 October 1943

Detachment operated from Sadiya, India (October 1943); Mokelbaria, India (May 1944); Dergaon, India (August-c. 15 September 1944)

- Myitkyina, Burma, c. 15 September 1944
- Moran, India, 8 May 1945
- Dudhkundi Airfield, India, 30 May – 6 October 1945
- Camp Kilmer, New Jersey, 1 – 3 November 1945
- Sheppard Air Force Base, Texas, 1 January 1973 – present)

=== Aircraft ===
- Republic P-47 Thunderbolt (1942–1943, 1944–1945)
- Curtiss P-40 Warhawk (1943–1944)
- Cessna T-37 Tweet (1973–2009)
- Beechcraft T-6 Texan II (2008 – present)
