= Sheppard Air Force Base =

US Air Force base near Wichita Falls, Texas, United States

- Near Wichita Falls, Texas in the United States of America
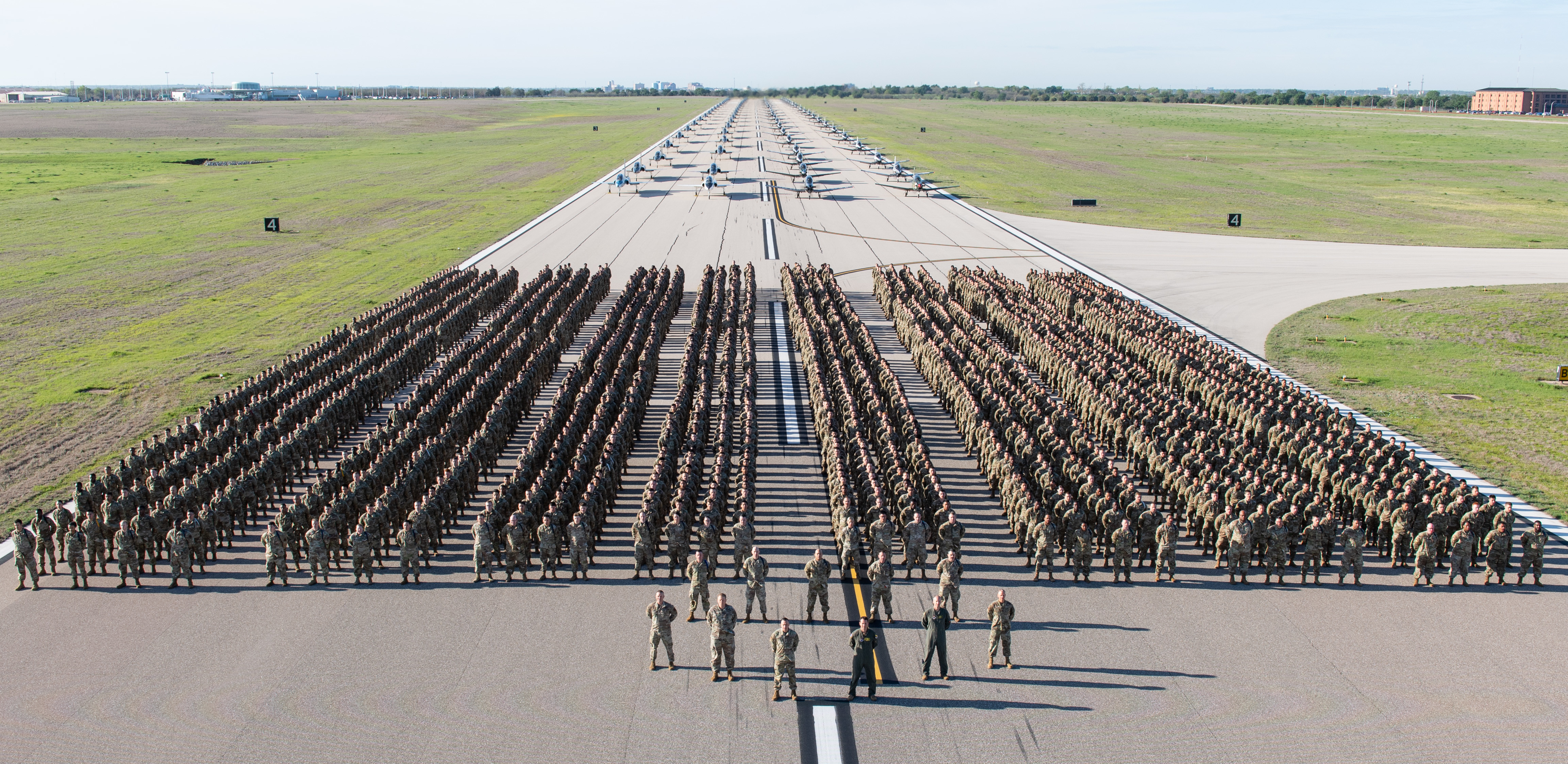
- Aircraft from the 80th Flying Training Wing and personnel from the 82nd Training Wing at Sheppard AFB.

Site information
- Type: US Air Force Base
- Owner: Department of Defense
- Operator: US Air Force (USAF)
- Controlled by: Air Education and Training Command (AETC)
- Condition: Operational
- Website: www.sheppard.af.mil/%20www.sheppard.af.mil

Location
- Location within North America Location within the United States Location within Texas
- Coordinates: 33°59′20″N 098°29′31″W

Site history
- Built: 1941 (as Sheppard Field)
- In use: 1941 – present

Garrison information
- Current commander: Colonel Samuel R. Mink
- Garrison: 82d Training Wing (Host); 80th Flying Training Wing

Airfield information
- Identifiers: IATA: SPS, ICAO: KSPS, FAA LID: SPS, WMO: 723513
- Elevation: 310.5 metres (1,019 ft) AMSL
Runways
| Direction | Length and surface |
|---|---|
| 15R/33L | 3,992.8 metres (13,100 ft) Concrete |
| 15C/33C | 3,048.6 metres (10,002 ft) Asphalt & concrete |
| 17/35 | 2,140 metres (7,021 ft) Asphalt |
| 15L/33R | 1,828.8 metres (6,000 ft) Asphalt & concrete |
- Airfield shared with Wichita Falls Municipal Airport. Source: Federal Aviation Administration

Sheppard Air Force Base (IATA: SPS, ICAO: KSPS, FAA LID: SPS) is a United States Air Force (USAF) base located five miles (8.0 km) north of the central business district of Wichita Falls, in Wichita County, Texas, United States. It is the largest training base and most diversified in Air Education and Training Command. The base is named in honor of Texas Senator John Morris Sheppard, a supporter of military preparations before World War II.

The host unit at Sheppard is the 82d Training Wing (82 TRW), which provides specialized technical training and field training for officers, airmen and civilians of all branches of the U.S. military, other Department of Defense agencies and foreign nationals.

The 80th Flying Training Wing (80 FTW), also at Sheppard, conducts the Euro-NATO Joint Jet Pilot Training (ENJJPT) program, a multi-nationally staffed and managed flying training program chartered to produce combat pilots for both USAF and NATO.

Colonel Samuel R. Mink is the commander of the 82d Training Wing and he concurrently serves as the installation commander of Sheppard AFB. Colonel Christopher P. Mulder is the commander of the 80th Flying Training Wing.

Sheppard AFB shares one runway with Wichita Falls Municipal Airport under a joint civil-military arrangement.

== History ==
Sheppard Air Force Base is named in honor of Senator John Morris Sheppard of Texas (1875–1941), chairman of the Senate Military Affairs Committee from 1933 until his death on 9 April 1941. Senator Sheppard helped lead the fight for military preparedness before the attack on Pearl Harbor.

The base began as Sheppard Field on 300 acres (1.2 km^{2}) just south of Kell Field. A Texas cattleman, oilman, and philanthropist, Joseph Sterling Bridwell, sold the land to the United States Army for one dollar.

It was officially opened as a United States Army Air Corps training center on 17 October 1941, following the arrival of the first military members on 14 June. As the Army Air Corps became the Army Air Forces, facilities were completed sufficiently to allow the first class of 22 aviation mechanics to enter training that October; the class graduated 23 February 1942.

During World War II, then-Sheppard Field conducted basic training, and it also trained glider mechanics, technical and flying training instructors and B-29 Superfortress flight engineers. In addition to the basic flying training, the base also provided advanced pilot training.

Sheppard Field reached its peak strength of 46,340 people while serving as a separation center for troops being discharged following World War II from September through November 1945. Sheppard Field was deactivated 31 August 1946 and declared surplus to the War Department's needs. It was transferred to the jurisdiction of the United States Army Corps of Engineers 30 April 1947. Over the next two years the Texas National Guard used the base.

=== USAF Training Center ===
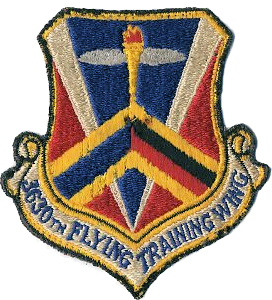
Emblem of the 3630th Pilot Training Wing (ATC)

Control and accountability for Sheppard Field was transferred to the Department of the Air Force 1 August 1948 and was reactivated 15 August 1948 to supplement Lackland AFB, Texas, as a basic training center renamed as Sheppard AFB. Basic training was discontinued in June 1949, but was resumed from July 1950 to May 1952.

Over the next three decades, three training schools were stationed at the base training students in aircraft maintenance, transportation, communication, civil engineering, aircrew life support and field training.

The aircraft mechanics school was transferred to Sheppard from Keesler AFB, Mississippi in April 1949 to make room for expansion of electronic training at that base. The school was renamed the Department of Aircraft Maintenance Training within the 3750th Technical School. During the Korean War (1950–1953) several airmen from such places as Greece and Turkey were trained as mechanics.

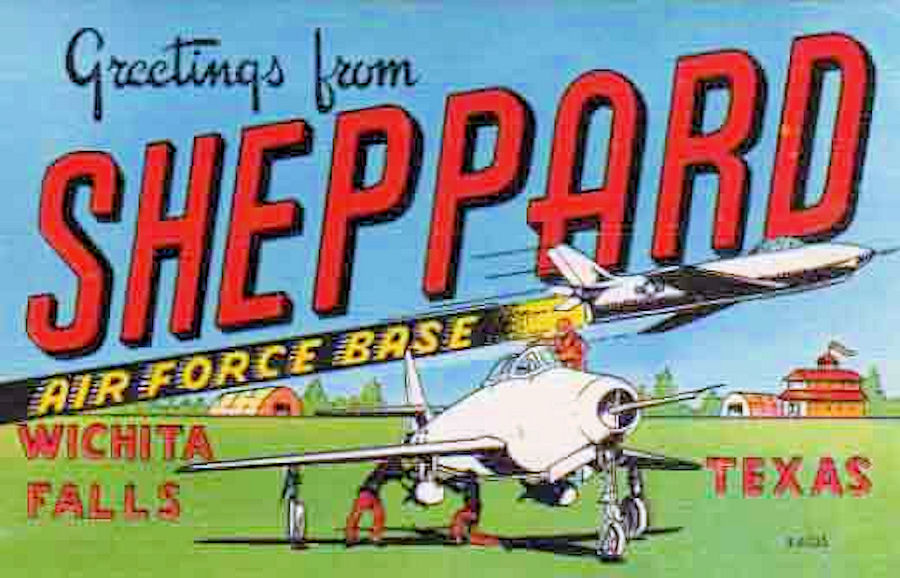
Sheppard AFB postcard from around 1953

Comptroller, transportation, and intelligence training moved to Sheppard from Lowry AFB, Colorado, in the fall of 1954. Communications, refrigeration, air conditioning, and power production operator and repairman training were transferred here from F.E. Warren AFB, Wyoming in 1959. Intelligence training returned to Lowry in February 1962. Training in certain missile systems began at Sheppard in 1957 and was conducted there through September 1985 when Titan II training operations were terminated following that weapon system's retirement.

The 3950th Technical Training Wing was designated the Sheppard Technical Training Center 1 January 1959. It has had two subsequent name changes and is now the 82d Training Wing.

Helicopter pilot training was transferred from Stead AFB, Nevada in October 1965, with H-19, H-43, Bell TH-1F, CH-3C and HH-3E helicopters used for training. Additional training in airborne firefighting was also conducted, given the role of the USAF HH-43 aircraft as a local rescue and aircraft firefighting asset at selected air force bases in the United States and at air bases overseas.

The 3630th Flying Training Wing was activated in 1965, and it assumed the helicopter training program. It began providing undergraduate pilot training in the T-37 and Northrop T-38 Talon for the then-West German Air Force in August 1966. Helicopter training was discontinued in 1971 when the U.S. Army assumed responsibility for training USAF helicopter pilots at Fort Rucker, Alabama.

The 3630th Flying Training Wing also provided undergraduate pilot training for pilots of the Republic of Vietnam Air Force from 1971 to 1975. The Wing designation was changed to the 80th Flying Training Wing on 1 January 1973.

The 80th Flying Training Wing began conducting the Euro-NATO Joint Jet Pilot Training Program in 1981. This one-of-a-kind program includes 13-NATO countries. They are: Belgium, Canada, Denmark, Germany, Greece, Italy, the Netherlands, Norway, Portugal, Spain, Turkey, the United Kingdom and the United States. Approval to conduct the program was recently extended through the year 2005.

The Air Force School of Health Care Sciences offered training in dentistry, medicine, nursing (to include flight nurse training), and health-services administration. The population of the base had declined to 3,825 in 1990.

In February 1992, restructuring and downsizing of the USAF caused a realignment and renumbering of units at Sheppard. Some of the training wings were redesignated as groups, and the technical training groups became squadrons.

=== Strategic Air Command ===
Between 1960 and 1966 the Strategic Air Command (SAC) had training units stationed at the base that conducted aerospace rescue schools and weather instruction. In addition, The 494th Bombardment Wing, a SAC operational wing of B-52D Stratofortress bombers and KC-135A Stratotanker aircraft, previously designated as the 4245th Strategic Wing, was based at Sheppard from 1963 to 1966.

In July 1969, Detachment 1, 2nd Bombardment Wing, with four B-52 aircraft, became a tenant organization at Sheppard and remained until 1975. These aircraft rotated as part of SAC's dispersal concept and utilized the SAC Alert Facility on the northwest end of the airfield.

=== BRAC 2005 ===
The DoD proposed a major realignment of the base, as part of the Base Realignment and Closure, 2005 program announced on 13 May 2005. DoD recommended relocating to Eglin AFB, Florida, front-line and instructor-qualified maintenance technicians and logistics support personnel to stand up the USAF's portion of the F-35 Lightning II Initial Joint Training Site there. This recommendation would establish Eglin AFB as the Initial Joint Training Site that would teach entry-level aviators and maintenance technicians how to safely operate and maintain the new F-35. Assuming no economic recovery, this recommendation could result in a maximum potential reduction of 487 jobs (295 direct jobs and 192 indirect jobs) over 2006–2011 in the Wichita Falls, TX, Metropolitan Statistical Area (0.5 percent).

=== Major commands to which assigned ===
- Army Air Forces Technical Training Command, 13 March 1942 – 31 July 1943
- Army Air Forces Training Command, 31 July 1943 – 1 July 1946
- Air Training Command, 1 July 1946 – 31 August 1946, 1 August 1948 – 1 July 1993
- Air Education and Training Command 1 July 1993–present

=== Major units assigned ===
- 62d Base HQ and Air Base Sq, 4 August 1941 – 1 May 1944
- 3706th AAF Base Unit, 1 May 1944 – 30 September 1946
- 3706th AAF Base Unit, 15 August 1948 – 28 August 1948
- 3750th Air Base Gp, 28 August 1948 – 1 January 1993 -3750 Civil Engineering Squadron
- 80th Flying Training Wing, – 1 January 1973–present

== Role and operations ==
=== 82d Training Wing ===
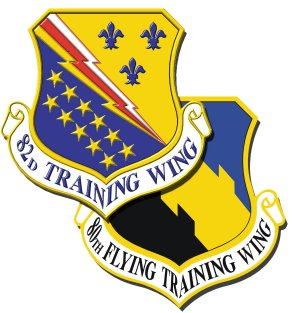

The host unit on Sheppard Air Force Base is the 82d Training Wing, whose mission makes it the most diversified training base within AETC. It is a non-flying wing that conducts all technical training at Sheppard. The 982d Training Group (982 TRG) provides instruction in a wide range of specialties at Sheppard and also at more than 60 USAF installations worldwide. The 82d Mission Support Group (82 MSG) and the 82 Medical Group (82 MDG) support these organizations. Together with the 80th Flying Training Wing more than 7 million U.S. and allied warriors have been trained.

=== 80th Flying Training Wing ===
The 80th Flying Training Wing's mission is "To produce NATO pilots with the skills and attitude to succeed in fighter aviation". It is home of the Euro-NATO Joint Jet Pilot Training (ENJJPT) Program. It is a uniquely staffed multinational organization with a USAF wing commander and a German Air Force operations group commander in the top two leadership positions. Command and operations officers' positions in the flying training squadrons rotate among the participating nations, while the commander of the 80th Operations Support Squadron is always from the USAF.

Officers from all 14 participating nations fill subordinate leadership positions throughout the wing. Ten nations--Belgium, Denmark, Germany, Italy, The Netherlands, Norway, Romania, Turkey, Spain and the United States—provide instructor pilots based on their number of student pilots. Canada, Greece and Spain do not have student pilots in training, but do provide one instructor pilot. The current non-active signatory nations, the United Kingdom and Portugal, do not send student pilots nor do they provide instructor pilots, but retain the right to do so at any time.

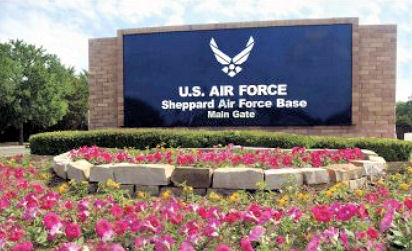
Main entrance sign

Operational training squadrons are:

- 80th OSS "Wizards"
- 88th Fighter Training Squadron "Lucky Devils" (T-38C)
- 89th Flying Training Squadron "Banshees" (T-6A)
- 90th Flying Training Squadron "Boxing Bears" (T-38C)
- 97th Flying Training Squadron "Madcats" (A.K.A. "Devil Cats")...Air Force Reserve Command Associate Instructor Pilot program (T-6A and T-38C)
- 459th Flying Training Squadron "Twin Dragons" (T-6A)
- 469th Flying Training Squadron "Fighting Bulls" (T-38C)

== Based units ==
Flying and notable non-flying units based at Sheppard Air Force Base.

Units marked GSU are Geographically Separate Units, which although based at Sheppard, are subordinate to a parent unit based at another location.

=== United States Air Force ===
Air Education and Training Command (AETC)

- Second Air Force
  - 82nd Training Wing (Host Wing)
    - Headquarters 82nd Training Wing
    - 82nd Comptroller Squadron
    - 82nd Training Group
      - 361st Training Squadron
      - 362nd Training Squadron
      - 363rd Training Squadron
    - 782nd Training Group
      - 364th Training Squadron
      - 365th Training Squadron
      - 366th Training Squadron
    - 982d Training Group
      - 367th Training Support Squadron
      - 372nd Training Squadron
      - 373rd Training Squadron
      - 982d Maintenance Squadron
    - 82nd Medical Group
      - 82nd Aerospace Medicine Squadron
      - 82nd Dental Squadron
      - 82nd Medical Support Squadron
      - 82nd Medical Operations Squadron
    - 82nd Mission Support Group
      - 82d Civil Engineer Squadron
      - 82nd Communications Squadron
      - 82nd Contracting Squadron
      - 82nd Force Support Squadron
      - 82nd Logistics Readiness Squadron
      - 82nd Security Forces Squadron
- Nineteenth Air Force
  - 80th Flying Training Wing
    - 80th Operations Group
      - 80th Operations Support Squadron
      - 88th Fighter Training Squadron – AT-38C Talon
      - 89th Flying Training Squadron – T-6A Texan II
      - 90th Flying Training Squadron – T-38C Talon
      - 459th Flying Training Squadron – T-6A Texan II
      - 469th Flying Training Squadron – T-38C Talon

Air Force Reserve Command (AFRC)

- Tenth Air Force
  - 340th Flying Training Group
    - 97th Flying Training Squadron (GSU) – AT-38C Talon, T-38C Talon, T-6A Texan II

== Education ==
Sheppard Elementary School of the Wichita Falls Independent School District is on Sheppard AFB property. Its attendance boundary, covering dependent children, includes Wind Creek Village and the southern portion of Heritage Heights. Burkburnett Independent School District is the school district for Freedom Heights and the northern portion of Heritage Heights. Portions of Sheppard AFB properties in Wichita Falls ISD are zoned to Hirschi Middle School and Wichita Falls Legacy High School.

Burkburnett High School is the public high school of Burkburnett ISD.

== See also ==
- Texas World War II Army Airfields
- Western Technical Training Command

== Other sources ==
- This article incorporates public domain material from the Air Force Historical Research Agency
- This article incorporates public domain material from Sheppard Air Force Base. United States Air Force.
- Maurer, Maurer. Air Force Combat Units of World War II. Washington, DC: United States Government Printing Office 1961 (republished 1983, Office of Air Force History, ISBN 0-912799-02-1).
- Ravenstein, Charles A. Air Force Combat Wings Lineage and Honors Histories 1947–1977. Maxwell Air Force Base, Alabama: Office of Air Force History 1984. ISBN 0-912799-12-9.
- Mueller, Robert, Air Force Bases Volume I, Active Air Force Bases Within the United States of America on 17 September 1982, Office of Air Force History, 1989
