= Tingkawk Sakan Airfield =

Former U.S. Army airfield in Burma

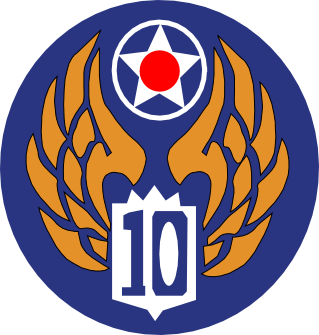
Tingkawk Sakan Airfield
- Part of Tenth Air Force
- Tingkawk Sakan, Burma

Site information
- Type: Military airfield
- Controlled by: United States Army Air Forces

Location
- Coordinates: 26°07′16″N 096°43′24″E (Approximate)

Site history
- Built: 1944
- In use: 1944-1945
- Battles/wars: Burma Campaign 1944-1945

Tingkawk Sakan Airfield is a former wartime United States Army Air Forces airfield in Burma used during the Burma Campaign 1944-1945. It is now abandoned.

== History ==
The airfield was a temporary field with a 4,000-foot runway consisting of gravel carved out of a 200-foot-high teak forest with temperatures running well above 100 °F (38 °C). The airfield was used by the 311th Fighter Group, beginning in late May 1944, flying North American P-51C Mustangs.

In August 1944, the 8th Reconnaissance Group, based at Barrackpore, India, sent a detachment of the 20th Reconnaissance Squadron to fly reconnaissance missions from the field with F-5s (Lockheed P-38 Lightning). The detachment moved out in November.

The 311th was replaced in August by the 80th Fighter Group, flying Republic P-47 Thunderbolts until January 1945 when the group moved to Myitkyina Airfield and the facility was closed.

Today, the airfield is abandoned, and has been reclaimed by the forest from which it was carved out of. A disturbed vegetation region in satellite imagery shows its approximate location.
