= Schempp-Hirth TG-15 =

Schempp-Hirth TG-15 is a designation used by the United States military. It has two variants:

- TG-15A: high performance two seat glider, Schempp-Hirth Duo Discus
- TG-15B: Standard Class glider, the Schempp-Hirth Discus-2
