= Guskhara Airfield =

WWII US airfield in India

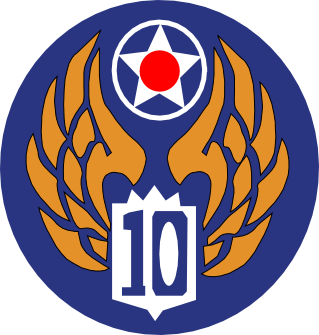
Guskara Airfield
- Part of Tenth Air Force
- Guskara, India

Site information
- Type: Military airfield
- Controlled by: United States Army Air Forces

Location
- Location within West Bengal Location within India
- Coordinates: 23°28′18″N 087°47′39″E

Site history
- Built: 1944
- In use: 1944-1945
- Battles/wars: Burma Campaign 1944-1945

Guskara Airfield is a former wartime United States Army Air Forces airfield in India used during the Burma Campaign 1944-1945. It is now abandoned.

== History ==
Guskara was a photo-recon base for the Tenth Air Force during 1944–1945. Its primary tenants were the following units:

- 8th Photographic Reconnaissance Group

20th Tactical Reconnaissance Squadron 5 January-26 March 1944
24th Combat Mapping Squadron 5 January 1944 - February 1945
40th Photographic Reconnaissance Squadron 18 July-9 August 1944

- 35th Photographic Reconnaissance Squadron (F-5/P-38) June 13, 1944 - September 1, 1944
- 426th Night Fighter Squadron, January–August 1945 (P-61) (Detachment)
- 2nd Weather Reconnaissance Squadron
