= Moran Town =

Moran
- Town
- Location in Assam, India Moran (India)
- Coordinates: 27.18°N 94.93°E
- Country: India
- State: Assam
- District: Dibrugarh
- Elevation: 97 m (318 ft)

Population (2011)
  - Total: 8,784

Languages
  - Official: Assamese
- Time zone: UTC+5:30 (IST)

Moran is a small town in Dibrugarh district in the Indian state of Assam. Moran is an important industrial town in India. It is a major oil field and a major tea-producing area.

== Etymology ==
The name "Moran" is actually the shortened form of "Moran-hat". The place used to be a trade centre where the people from Moran tribe used to visit in order to sell their products in the north of Dihing which was located in the Chutiya kingdom. It is from this centre that "Moran-hat" derives its name.

== History ==
The area known as Moranhat located in the Sibsagar district is of great historical significance in Upper Assam. The place got its name from the market (hat in Assamese) set up by the people of Moran tribe in ancient times. The geographical condition of the region was very different from today in those times. At that time, the Dihing river flowed south of present-day Moranhat and Sepon region as the Disoi, had the rivers Disang and Dikhou as its tributaries, ultimately joining the Brahmaputra in Mahuramukh (Bokakhat) and Lakhou (Kaliabor). At a later period (probably late 16th century), this stream of the Dihing dried out and the Dihing took another course to the north. This led to the overflow of water in the Brahmaputra to the north and the previously dried out course of Dihing was taken up by the Brahmaputra which lead to the formation of Majuli island. The people of the Moran tribe lived to the south of the Dihing (Diroi) while the Chutia people lived north of the Dihing. The Morans often crossed the Dihing and set up their markets in Moranhat. Finally, after the fall of Chutia kingdom, the region was occupied by the Ahoms whose king Suhungmung built his capital in Bokota near the banks of the Dihing river. Before that, the queen of Tyao Khamti also fled the Ahom kingdom by crossing the Dihing and reached Habung while further shows the geographical condition of that time.

== Geography ==
Moran is located at 27.18°N 94.93°E. It has an average elevation of 97 m (318 ft).

== Demographics ==
As of 2001 India census, Moran Town had a population of 6784. Males constitute 53% of the population and females 47%. Moran Town has an average literacy rate of 84%, higher than the national average of 59.5%: male literacy is 86%, and female literacy is 81%. In Moran Town, 10% of the population is under 6 years of age.

== Government ==
Moran is part of Dibrugarh (Lok Sabha constituency).
