= List of United States Air Force combat operations squadrons =

In the United States Air Force, combat operations squadrons are responsible for monitoring, upholding, and, if necessary, modifying the air tasking order. These squadrons generally require a large amount of intelligence on the status of the battlefield.

Combat Operations Squadrons
Squadron	Shield	Location	Augmented AOC
601st Combat Operations Squadron			
607th Combat Operations Squadron		Osan AB, Korea	Inactivated in 2008
608th Combat Operations Squadron		Barksdale AFB	Inactivated in 2008
609th Combat Operations Squadron			
612th Combat Operations Squadron		Davis-Monthan AFB	
701st Combat Operations Squadron		March ARB	Assigned to HTACC/607th Air and Space Operations Center
710th Combat Operations Squadron		Langley AFB	Assigned to
713th Combat Operations Squadron		Beale AFB	Assigned to 613th Air and Space Operations Center
820th Combat Operations Squadron		Moody AFB	Not AOC augmentees

== See also ==
- List of United States Air Force squadrons
