= List of United States Air Force electronic systems squadrons =

In the United States Air Force (USAF), an electronic systems squadron is a squadron primarily or solely focused on systems such as surveillance, intelligence, and data. The following is a list of all such squadrons in the USAF.

== Electronic Systems Squadrons ==
Squadron	Emblem	Location	Nickname	Note
630th Electronic Systems Squadron	Hanscom AFB		Special Programs	
631st Electronic Systems Squadron	Hanscom AFB		Intelligence, Surveillance, & Recon Programs	
632d Electronic Systems Squadron	Hanscom AFB			
633d Electronic Systems Squadron	Hanscom AFB		E-8 Vehicle Squadron	
634th Electronic Systems Squadron	Hanscom AFB		Mission Planning Operational Capabilities	
635th Electronic Systems Squadron		Hanscom AFB		E-3 Operational Capabilities
636th Electronic Systems Squadron	Hanscom AFB		E-3 Netcentric Capabilities	
637th Electronic Systems Squadron	Hanscom AFB		E-10 Weapon System	
638th Electronic Systems Squadron	Hanscom AFB		Multi Platform Radar Tech Insertion Prgm Sys	
639th Electronic Systems Squadron	Hanscom AFB		MEECN Systems	
640th Electronic Systems Squadron	Hanscom AFB		Tac Data Link/Gateway Network Systems	
641st Electronic Systems Squadron	Hanscom AFB		Mobile Landing Systems	
642d Electronic Systems Squadron	Hanscom AFB		Force Protection Systems	
644th Electronic Systems Squadron	Hanscom AFB		Warfighting Experimentation & Test	
753d Electronic Systems Squadron	Hanscom AFB		Intelligence	

== See also ==
- List of United States Air Force squadrons
