= List of United States Air Force operations squadrons =

This is a list of United States Air Force operations squadrons. It serves as a break out of the comprehensive List of United States Air Force squadrons.

Squadron	Shield	Location	Nickname	Aircraft	Note
39th Information Operations Squadron		Hurlburt Field, Florida			Specializes in cyber warfare, information operations, and electronic warfare training.
7405th Operations Squadron		Rhein Main AB, Germany	Berlin for Lunch Bunch	C-130E-LM	Played a key role in Cold War operations, including intelligence and resupply missions.
7580th Operations Squadron		Rhein Main AB, Germany		C-130E-LM	Supported critical logistical and tactical airlift missions during the Cold War.

== See also ==
- List of United States Air Force squadrons
