= List of United States Air Force air operations squadrons =

A list of the United States Air Force air operation squadrons.

Air Operations Squadrons
Squadron	Shield	Location	Note
32d Air Operations Squadron		Ramstein AB	Inactive
56th Air Operations Squadron		Hickam AFB	
66th Air Operations Squadron		Pope Army Airfield	
101st Air Operations Squadron		Otis ANGB	
112th Air Operations Squadron		Pennsylvania	
605th Air Operations Squadron		Yokota AB	
611th Air Operations Squadron		Elmendorf AFB	

== See also ==
- List of United States Air Force squadrons
