= List of United States Air Force combat camera squadrons =

This article lists the combat camera squadrons of the United States Air Force. Combat Camera (COMCAM) units are tasked with the acquisition of still and motion imagery of military operations.

== Combat camera squadrons ==
Combat Camera Squadrons
Squadron	Shield	Location	Status
1st Combat Camera Squadron		Charleston AFB, South Carolina	Active
2d Combat Camera Squadron		Hill AFB, Utah	Inactive
3d Combat Camera Squadron		Lackland AFB, Texas	Active
4th Combat Camera Squadron		Joint Base Charleston, South Carolina	Reserve
1352d Combat Camera Squadron		Norton AFB, California	Inactive

== See also ==
- List of United States Air Force squadrons
- First Motion Picture Unit
