= List of United States Air Force recruiting squadrons =

This article is a list of United States Air Force recruiting squadrons both active, inactive, and historical. The purpose of a United States Air Force recruiting squadron is to provide a means of reaching out to the public in order to recruit people for service within the air force.

== List ==
Recruiting Squadrons
Squadron	Shield	Location	State Coverage
311th Recruiting Squadron		Canonsburg, PA	PA, OH, WV, MD
313th Recruiting Squadron		North Syracuse, NY	NY
314th Recruiting Squadron		Burlington, NJ	NJ, PA, DE, MD
317th Recruiting Squadron		Oxon Hill, MD	DC, MD, VA
319th Recruiting Squadron		Hanscom AFB, MA	CT, ME, MA, NH, RI, VT
331st Recruiting Squadron		Maxwell-Gunter, AL	AL, FL, LA, MS
332nd Recruiting Squadron		Nashville, TN	TN, KY, IN, VA, WV, NC, GA, AL
333rd Recruiting Squadron		Patrick SFB, FL	FL, PR
336th Recruiting Squadron		Moody AFB, GA	FL, GA, SC
337th Recruiting Squadron		Shaw AFB, SC	NC, SC
338th Recruiting Squadron		Wright-Patterson AFB, OH	IN, KY, OH, WV
339th Recruiting Squadron		Clinton Township, MI	IN, MI, OH
341st Recruiting Squadron		Lackland AFB, TX	LA, TX
343rd Recruiting Squadron		Offutt AFB, NE	IA, MN, NE, ND, SD, WI
344th Recruiting Squadron		Arlington, TX	AR, LA, MS, TX
345th Recruiting Squadron		Scott AFB, IL	AR, IL, KY, MS, MO, TN
347th Recruiting Squadron		Milwaukee, WI	IL, IA, MI, WI
349th Recruiting Squadron		Tinker AFB, OK	AR, KS, OK, MO
361st Recruiting Squadron		McChord AFB, WA	AK, OR, WA
362nd Recruiting Squadron		March ARB, CA	AZ, CA
364th Recruiting Squadron		McClellan Park, CA	CA
367th Recruiting Squadron		Colorado Springs, CO	CO, NM, TX, WY
368th Recruiting Squadron		Hill AFB, UT	ID, MT, NV, UT, WA
369th Recruiting Squadron		Encino, CA	CA, HI

== See also ==
- List of United States Air Force squadrons
