= List of United States Air Force field investigative squadrons =

A list of the United States Air Force field investigative squadrons.

Field Investigative Squadrons
Squadron	Shield	Location	Note
24th Expeditionary Field Investigative Squadron		Al Udeid AB	
51st Field Investigative Squadron			
52d Field Investigative Squadron		Ankara	
53d Field Investigative Squadron		Aviano AB	
61st Field Investigative Squadron		Osan AB	
62d Field Investigative Squadron		Yokota AB	
63d Field Investigative Squadron		Elmendorf AFB	

== See also ==
- List of United States Air Force squadrons
