= List of United States Air Force air base squadrons =

List of United States Air Force air base squadrons including name, emblem location and notes.

Air Base Squadrons (AFCON)
Squadron	Emblem	Location	Note
13th Air Base Squadron			
14th Air Base Squadron			
15th Air Base Squadron			
20th Air Base Squadron			
23d Air Base Squadron			
33d Air Base Squadron			
34th Air Base Squadron			
35th Air Base Squadron			
43d Air Base Squadron		Pope Field, North Carolina	
47th Air Base Squadron			
53d Air Base Squadron			
54th Air Base Squadron			
59th Air Base Squadron			
74th Air Base Squadron			
79th Air Base Squadron			
80th Air Base Squadron			
81st Air Base Squadron			
82d Air Base Squadron			
83d Air Base Squadron			
84th Air Base Squadron			
86th Air Base Squadron			
87th Air Base Squadron			
89th Air Base Squadron			
90th Air Base Squadron			
91st Air Base Squadron			
315th Air Base Squadron			
324th Air Base Squadron			
325th Air Base Squadron			
326th Air Base Squadron			
328th Air Base Squadron			
329th Air Base Squadron			
333d Air Base Squadron			
349th Air Base Squadron			
356th Air Base Squadron			
371st Air Base Squadron			
420th Air Base Squadron			
421st Air Base Squadron			
422d Air Base Squadron		RAF Croughton	
423d Air Base Squadron		RAF Molesworth	
424th Air Base Squadron		RAF Fairford	
425th Air Base Squadron		İzmir, Turkey	
426th Air Base Squadron		Stavanger, Norway	
431st Air Base Squadron			
445th Air Base Squadron			
446th Air Base Squadron			
470th Air Base Squadron		NATO Air Base Geilenkirchen, Germany	
473d Air Base Squadron			
475th Air Base Squadron			
476th Air Base Squadron			
478th Air Base Squadron			
496th Air Base Squadron		Morón Air Base, Spain	
502d Air Base Squadron			
503d Air Base Squadron			
512th Air Base Squadron			
514th Air Base Squadron			
515th Air Base Squadron			
516th Air Base Squadron			
517th Air Base Squadron			
518th Air Base Squadron			
519th Air Base Squadron			
520th Air Base Squadron			
521st Air Base Squadron			
525th Air Base Squadron			
527th Air Base Squadron			
528th Air Base Squadron			
529th Air Base Squadron			
530th Air Base Squadron			
533d Air Base Squadron			
534th Air Base Squadron			
551st Air Base Squadron			
612th Air Base Squadron		Soto Cano AB, Honduras	
632nd Air Base Squadron			
655th Air Base Squadron			
656th Air Base Squadron			
717th Air Base Squadron		Ankara, Turkey	
720th Air Base Squadron			
722d Air Base Squadron			
724th Air Base Squadron			
768th Air Base Squadron			
900th Air Base Squadron			
903d Air Base Squadron			
912th Air Base Squadron			
938th Air Base Squadron			
943d Air Base Squadron			
Air Base Squadrons (MAJCOM)
Squadron	Shield	Location	Note
1015th Air Base Squadron			
4030th Air Base Squadron			
4254th Air Base Squadron			
4255th Air Base Squadron		Lincoln AFB	
4260th Air Base Squadron			
6019th Air Base Squadron		Korea	
6152d Air Base Squadron		Korea	
7350th Air Base Squadron		Tempelhof Central Airport, Germany	
7509th Air Base Squadron		RAF Upper Heyford, United Kingdom	

== See also ==
- List of United States Air Force squadrons

[
