= List of active United States Air Force aircraft squadrons =

This is an organized list of all of the active aircraft squadrons that currently exist in the United States Air Force, sorted by type. Most squadrons have changed names and designations many times over the years, so they are listed by their current designation. Squadrons are only listed if flying aircraft is their primary mission (other units such as certain Training & Combat Training Squadrons, Student Squadrons, Test Squadrons, Operations Support Squadrons, and Group / Wing / NAF / MAJCOM staffs may have large contingents of aircrew assigned, but they do not "own" aircraft and their mission does not necessarily revolve around flying. Those squadrons maintain Administrative Control (ADCON) of those attached personnel, while the operational flying squadrons retain Operational Control (OPCON)). Aircraft are separated based on MDS (not MWS). (Note: MDS = "Mission-Design-Series" which is a term defined by the 1962 United States Tri-Service aircraft designation system while MWS = "Major Weapons System" which is a term specific to the USAF and describes a significant combat or combat support system that an airman is assigned to operate or maintain such as a specific aircraft (whether that aircraft employs "weapons" in a classic sense or not), a ground based communications system, a command and control system or an intelligence collection system for example.) Provisional "Expeditionary" Squadrons are listed. In cases where a squadron's group assignment is other than an Operations Group (OG) carrying the same number of the wing the group is listed (in parenthesis) under the wing. Detachments are listed under their own menu when assigned to a Group-level unit or higher.

To see all USAF squadrons, regardless of active or not, as well as non-flying squadrons, go to the List of United States Air Force squadrons

== Aggressor Squadrons (AGRS) ==
Squadron Name	Insignia	Nickname	Command	Air Force	Wing	Date First Activated	Base	Aircraft	Tail Code
64th Aggressor Squadron		Gomers	Air Combat Command	United States Air Force Warfare Center	57 WG	15 January 1941	Nellis AFB, Nevada	F-16C/D (Blocks 25, 32, 40)	WA
65th Aggressor Squadron			Air Combat Command	United States Air Force Warfare Center	57 WG	15 January 1941	Nellis AFB, Nevada	F-35A	WA
706th Aggressor Squadron		Cajuns	Air Force Reserve Command	Tenth Air Force	926 WG	1 April 1943	Nellis AFB, Nevada	18x Block 30 F-16C/Ds awaiting divestment	LV
706th Aggressor Squadron		Cajuns	Air Force Reserve Command	Tenth Air Force	926 WG	1 April 1943	Nellis AFB, Nevada	Also a TFI Reserve Associate to 65 AGRS, 6 WPS, 16 WPS, 17 WPS, 66 WPS, 433 WPS (Note: A TFI "Reserve Associate" or "Classic Associate" unit to the Active Duty Squadron who actually "owns the iron". Flies with the Active Duty unit's aircraft, but this Squadron doesn't necessarily "own" the plane. Some aircraft "owned" by Active Duty in certain units have unique tailflashes to reflect their associate unit.)	

== Air Refueling Squadrons (ARS) ==
Squadron Name	Insignia	Nickname	Command	Air Force	Wing	Date First Activated	Base	Aircraft	Tail Code	Notes
2nd Air Refueling Squadron			Air Mobility Command	Twenty-First Air Force	305 AMW	1 December 1915	JB McGuire–Dix–Lakehurst, New Jersey	KC-46A		
6th Air Refueling Squadron			Air Mobility Command	Eighteenth Air Force	60 AMW	1 February 1940	Travis AFB, California	KC-46A		
9th Air Refueling Squadron			Air Mobility Command	Eighteenth Air Force	60 AMW	1 February 1942	Travis AFB, California	KC-46A		
18th Air Refueling Squadron			Air Force Reserve Command	Fourth Air Force	931 ARW	11 December 1940	McConnell AFB, Kansas	TFI Reserve Associate to 350 ARS		
32nd Air Refueling Squadron			Air Mobility Command	Twenty-First Air Force	305 AMW	13 June 1917	JB McGuire–Dix–Lakehurst, New Jersey	KC-46A		
50th Air Refueling Squadron			Air Mobility Command	Twenty-First Air Force	6 ARW	15 June 1942	MacDill AFB, Florida	KC-135R/T		Awaiting KC-46A circa 2028
54th Air Refueling Squadron		Jesters	Air Education and Training Command	Nineteenth Air Force	97 AMW	1 June 1942	Altus AFB, Oklahoma	KC-135R		(Note: Formal Training Unit (FTU) / Initial Qualification Training (IQT) "B-Course" unit for this airframe.)
56th Air Refueling Squadron			Air Education and Training Command	Nineteenth Air Force	97 AMW	18 November 1942	Altus AFB, Oklahoma	KC-46A		
63rd Air Refueling Squadron		Pirates; Air Reserve Refueling Guys	Air Force Reserve Command	Fourth Air Force	927 ARW	12 December 1942	MacDill AFB, Florida	TFI Reserve Associate to 50 ARS, 91 ARS		
64th Air Refueling Squadron			Air Mobility Command	Eighteenth Air Force	22 ARW	12 December 1942	Pease ANGB, New Hampshire	TFI Active Associate to 133 ARS (Note: A TFI "Active Associate" unit to the ANG/AFRC Squadron who actually "owns the iron". Flies with the ANG/AFRC unit's aircraft, but this Squadron doesn't necessarily "own" the plane. Some aircraft "owned" by Active Duty in certain units have unique tailflashes to reflect their associate unit.)		
70th Air Refueling Squadron		Orcas; Flying Eagles	Air Force Reserve Command	Fourth Air Force	349 AMW	16 July 1942	Travis AFB, California	TFI Reserve Associate to 6ARS, 9 ARS		
72nd Air Refueling Squadron			Air Force Reserve Command	Fourth Air Force	434 ARW	9 February 1943	Grissom ARB, Indiana	KC-135R		(Note: Part of this unit is on 24/7 "Alpha" alert at this facility under OPCON of AFSTRAT-AIR to provide air refueling in support of OPLAN 801X.)
74th Air Refueling Squadron			Air Force Reserve Command	Fourth Air Force	434 ARW	9 February 1943	Grissom ARB, Indiana	KC-135R		(Note: Part of this unit is on 24/7 "Alpha" alert at this facility under OPCON of AFSTRAT-AIR to provide air refueling in support of OPLAN 801X.)
76th Air Refueling Squadron			Air Force Reserve Command	Fourth Air Force	514 AMW	February 1943	JB McGuire–Dix–Lakehurst, New Jersey	TFI Reserve Associate to 2 ARS, 32 ARS		
77th Air Refueling Squadron		The Totin' TigersDouble Lucky	Air Force Reserve Command	Fourth Air Force	916 ARW	25 February 1943	Seymour Johnson AFB, North Carolina	KC-46A		
79th Air Refueling Squadron			Air Force Reserve Command	Fourth Air Force	349 AMW	1 April 1943	Travis AFB, California	TFI Reserve Associate to 6 ARS, 9 ARS		
91st Air Refueling Squadron			Air Mobility Command	Twenty-First Air Force	6 ARW	15 January 1941	MacDill AFB, Florida	KC-135R/T		
92nd Air Refueling Squadron			Air Mobility Command	Eighteenth Air Force	92 ARW	15 January 1941	Fairchild AFB, Washington	KC-135R/T		
93rd Air Refueling Squadron			Air Mobility Command	Eighteenth Air Force	92 ARW	25 October 1942	Fairchild AFB, Washington	KC-135R/T		
97th Air Refueling Squadron		Kick Astra	Air Mobility Command	Eighteenth Air Force	92 ARW	15 January 1941	Fairchild AFB, Washington	KC-135R/T		
99th Air Refueling Squadron		Black Knights	Air Mobility Command	Twenty-First Air Force	6 ARW	15 July 1942	Sumpter Smith ANGB, Alabama	TFI Active Associate to 106 ARS		
106th Air Refueling Squadron		Dixie Refuelers	Air National Guard, Alabama		117 ARW	27 August 1917	Sumpter Smith ANGB, Alabama	KC-135R		(Note: Part of this unit is on 24/7 "Alpha" alert at this facility under OPCON of CONR to provide air refueling in support of Operation NOBLE EAGLE.)
108th Air Refueling Squadron			Air National Guard, Illinois		126 ARW	27 August 1917	Scott AFB, Illinois	KC-135R		
116th Air Refueling Squadron			Air National Guard, Washington		141 ARW	29 August 1917	Fairchild AFB, Washington	TFI Reserve Associate to 92 ARS, 93 ARS, 97 ARS, 384 ARS		
117th Air Refueling Squadron		Kansas Coyotes	Air National Guard, Kansas		190 ARW	26 June 1942	Forbes Field ANGB, Kansas	KC-135R		
126th Air Refueling Squadron		Brew City Tankers	Air National Guard, Wisconsin		128 ARW	12 November 1940	General Mitchell ANGB, Wisconsin	KC-135R		
132nd Air Refueling Squadron		MAINEiacs	Air National Guard, Maine		101 ARW	2 March 1942	Bangor ANGB, Maine	KC-135R		
133rd Air Refueling Squadron			Air National Guard, New Hampshire		157 ARW	2 March 1942	Pease ANGB, New Hampshire	KC-46A		(Note: Provides sortie generation for the aircraft's ANG AFRC Test Center (AATC) Combined Test Force (CTF) or "test detachment".) (Note: Unit is on 24/7 "Bravo" Alert at this facility to support global air mobility operations such as air refueling, airlift, aeromedical evacuation, etc. under TACON of 618 AOC.)
141st Air Refueling Squadron		Tigers	Air National Guard, New Jersey		108 WG	8 October 1917	JB McGuire–Dix–Lakehurst, New Jersey	TFI Reserve Associate to 2 ARS, 32 ARS		
146th Air Refueling Squadron			Air National Guard, Pennsylvania		171 ARW	1 October 1942	Pittsburgh IAP ARS, Pennsylvania	KC-135T		
147th Air Refueling Squadron			Air National Guard, Pennsylvania		171 ARW	1 October 1942	Pittsburgh IAP ARS, Pennsylvania	KC-135T		
151st Air Refueling Squadron			Air National Guard, Tennessee		134 ARW	15 December 1957	McGhee Tyson ANGB, Tennessee	KC-135R		Awaiting KC-46A circa 2031
153rd Air Refueling Squadron		Magnolia Militia	Air National Guard, Mississippi		186 ARW	27 September 1939	Key Field ANGB, Mississippi	KC-135R		
166th Air Refueling Squadron			Air National Guard, Ohio		121 ARW	1 December 1942	Rickenbacker ANGB, Ohio	KC-135R		
168th Air Refueling Squadron			Air National Guard, Alaska		168 WG	26 June 1942	Eielson AFB, Alaska	KC-135R		(Note: Part of this unit is on 24/7 "Alpha" alert at this facility under OPCON of ANR to provide air refueling in support of Operation NOBLE EAGLE.)
170th Air Refueling Squadron		Knights	Air National Guard, New Jersey		108 WG	8 March 2024	JB McGuire–Dix–Lakehurst, New Jersey	TFI Reserve Associate to 2 ARS, 32 ARS		
171st Air Refueling Squadron		Michigan Six Pack	Air National Guard, Michigan		127 WG (127 ARG)	10 February 1943	Selfridge ANGB, Michigan	KC-135T		Awaiting KC-46A circa 2029
173rd Air Refueling Squadron		Huskers	Air National Guard, Nebraska		155 ARW	1 July 1943	Lincoln ANGB, Nebraska	KC-135R		
174th Air Refueling Squadron		Bats	Air National Guard, Iowa		185 ARW	15 May 1943	Sioux City ANGB, Iowa	KC-135R		
191st Air Refueling Squadron		Ruddy Ducks	Air National Guard, Utah		151 ARW	15 October 1943	Roland R. Wright ANGB, Utah	KC-135R		
197th Air Refueling Squadron		Copperheads	Air National Guard, Arizona		161 ARW	15 August 1943	Goldwater ANGB, Arizona	KC-135R		
203rd Air Refueling Squadron			Air National Guard, Hawaii		154 WG	16 January 1993	JB Pearl Harbor–Hickam, Hawaii	KC-135R	HH	
314th Air Refueling Squadron		PegBurs; Bad Asses	Air Force Reserve Command	Fourth Air Force	940 ARW	1 November 1943	Beale AFB, California	KC-135R		
328th Air Refueling Squadron			Air Force Reserve Command	Fourth Air Force	914 ARW	15 April 1944	Niagara Falls ARS, New York	KC-135R		
336th Air Refueling Squadron		RRats	Air Force Reserve Command	Fourth Air Force	452 AMW	3 November 1942	March ARB, California	KC-135R		Awaiting KC-46A circa 2027
344th Air Refueling Squadron			Air Mobility Command	Eighteenth Air Force	22 ARW	3 February 1942	McConnell AFB, Kansas	KC-46A		
349th Air Refueling Squadron		Bandits	Air Mobility Command	Eighteenth Air Force	22 ARW	1 June 1942	McConnell AFB, Kansas	KC-46A		
350th Air Refueling Squadron		Red Falcons	Air Mobility Command	Eighteenth Air Force	22 ARW	1 June 1942	McConnell AFB, Kansas	KC-135R/T		
351st Air Refueling Squadron			United States Air Forces in Europe – Air Forces Africa	Third Air Force	100 ARW	1 June 1942	RAF Mildenhall, United Kingdom	KC-135R/T	D	
384th Air Refueling Squadron		Squarepatchers	Air Mobility Command	Eighteenth Air Force	92 ARW	5 March 1943	Fairchild AFB, Washington	KC-135R/T		
465th Air Refueling Squadron		Okies	Air Force Reserve Command	Fourth Air Force	507 ARW	12 October 1944	Tinker AFB, Oklahoma	KC-135R		
756th Air Refueling Squadron			Air Force Reserve Command	Fourth Air Force	459 ARW	1 July 1943	JB Andrews, Maryland	KC-135R		
905th Air Refueling Squadron			Air Force Reserve Command	Fourth Air Force	931 ARW	7 September 1942	McConnell AFB, Kansas	TFI Reserve Associate to 344 ARS, 349 ARS		
906th Air Refueling Squadron			Air Mobility Command	Eighteenth Air Force	375 AMW	15 January 1941	Scott AFB, Illinois	TFI Active Associate to 108 ARS		
909th Air Refueling Squadron		Young Tigers	Pacific Air Forces	Fifth Air Force	18 WG	1 March 1942	Kadena AB, Japan	KC-135R/T		
911th Air Refueling Squadron			Air Mobility Command	Twenty-First Air Force	6 ARW	c. 15 May 1917	Seymour Johnson AFB, North Carolina	TFI Active Associate to 77 ARS		
912th Air Refueling Squadron		Hollywood Tankers	Air Mobility Command	Eighteenth Air Force	92 ARW	15 June 1942	March ARB, California	TFI Active Associate to 336 ARS		
924th Air Refueling Squadron			Air Force Reserve Command	Fourth Air Force	931 ARW	27 April 1942	McConnell AFB, Kansas	TFI Reserve Associate to 344 ARS, 349 ARS		

== Airborne Air Control Squadrons (AACS) ==
Squadron Name	Insignia	Nickname	Command	Air Force	Wing	Date First Activated	Base	Aircraft	Tail Code
960th Airborne Air Control Squadron		Vikings	Air Combat Command	Fifteenth Air Force	552 ACW	15 January 1941	Tinker AFB, Oklahoma	E-3G	OK
961st Airborne Air Control Squadron		Ronin Cowboys	Pacific Air Forces	Fifth Air Force	18 WG	15 January 1941	Kadena AB, Japan	E-3G	ZZ
962nd Airborne Air Control Squadron			Pacific Air Forces	Eleventh Air Force	3 WG	1 November 1943	JB Elmendorf–Richardson, Alaska	E-3G	AK
963rd Airborne Air Control Squadron		Blue Knights	Air Combat Command	Fifteenth Air Force	552 ACW	7 December 1942	Tinker AFB, Oklahoma	E-3G	OK
964th Airborne Air Control Squadron		Phoenixes	Air Combat Command	Fifteenth Air Force	552 ACW	15 July 1942	Tinker AFB, Oklahoma	E-3G	OK
965th Airborne Air Control Squadron		Golden Eagles	Air Combat Command	Fifteenth Air Force	552 ACW	16 February 1943	Tinker AFB, Oklahoma	E-3G	OK
966th Airborne Air Control Squadron		The Sixth	Air Combat Command	Fifteenth Air Force	552 ACW (552 TRG)	15 July 1942	Tinker AFB, Oklahoma	E-3G	OK
970th Airborne Air Control Squadron		Thumper	Air Force Reserve Command	Tenth Air Force	513 ACG (Note: Group reports directly to Numbered AF)	5 June 1944	Tinker AFB, Oklahoma	TFI Reserve Associate to 960 AACS, 963 AACS, 964 AACS, 965 AACS, 966 AACS	

== Airlift Squadrons (AS) ==
Note: Most Active Duty and FTU C-130J squadrons operate a mix of C-130J and C-130J-30 airframes.

Squadron Name	Insignia	Nickname	Command	Air Force	Wing	Date First Activated	Base	Aircraft	Tail Code	Notes
1st Airlift Squadron		SAM Fox	Air Mobility Command	Eighteenth Air Force	89 AW	23 March 1944	JB Andrews, Maryland	C-32A; C-40B		
3rd Airlift Squadron		Royals	Air Mobility Command	Twenty-First Air Force	436 AW	7 March 1942	Dover AFB, Delaware	C-17A		
4th Airlift Squadron		Fighting Fourth	Air Mobility Command	Eighteenth Air Force	62 AW	8 July 1935	JB Lewis–McChord, Washington	C-17A		
6th Airlift Squadron		Bully Beef Express	Air Mobility Command	Twenty-First Air Force	305 AMW	14 October 1939	JB McGuire–Dix–Lakehurst, New Jersey	C-17A		
7th Airlift Squadron			Air Mobility Command	Eighteenth Air Force	62 AW	14 October 1939	JB Lewis–McChord, Washington	C-17A		
8th Airlift Squadron		Workhorses	Air Mobility Command	Eighteenth Air Force	62 AW	1 February 1940	JB Lewis–McChord, Washington	C-17A		
9th Airlift Squadron		Proud Pelicans	Air Mobility Command	Twenty-First Air Force	436 AW	1 Dec 1940	Dover AFB, Delaware	C-5M		
14th Airlift Squadron		The Pelicans	Air Mobility Command	Twenty-First Air Force	437 AW	4 December 1940	JB Charleston, South Carolina	C-17A		
15th Airlift Squadron		Global Eagles	Air Mobility Command	Twenty-First Air Force	437 AW	4 December 1940	JB Charleston, South Carolina	C-17A		
16th Airlift Squadron			Air Mobility Command	Twenty-First Air Force	437 AW	11 December 1940	JB Charleston, South Carolina	C-17A		
21st Airlift Squadron		BEEliners	Air Mobility Command	Eighteenth Air Force	60 AMW	3 April 1942	Travis AFB, California	C-17A		
22nd Airlift Squadron		Double Deuce; Mulies	Air Mobility Command	Eighteenth Air Force	60 AMW	3 April 1942	Travis AFB, California	C-5M		
36th Airlift Squadron		Eagle Airlifters	Pacific Air Forces	Fifth Air Force	374 AW	14 February 1942	Yokota AB, Japan	C-130J	YJ	
37th Airlift Squadron		Blue Tail Flies	United States Air Forces in Europe – Air Forces Africa	Third Air Force	86 AW	14 February 1942	Ramstein AB, Germany	C-130J	RS	
39th Airlift Squadron		Trailblazers	Air Mobility Command	Eighteenth Air Force	317 AW	22 February 1942	Dyess AFB, Texas	C-130J	DYESS	
40th Airlift Squadron		Screaming Eagles	Air Mobility Command	Eighteenth Air Force	317 AW	18 February 1942	Dyess AFB, Texas	C-130J	DYESS	
41st Airlift Squadron		Black Cats	Air Mobility Command	Twenty-First Air Force	19 AW	18 February 1942	Little Rock AFB, Arkansas	C-130J	THE ROCK	
54th Airlift Squadron			Air Mobility Command	Eighteenth Air Force	375 AMW	8 August 1917	Scott AFB, Illinois	TFI Active Associate to 73 AS		
58th Airlift Squadron		Ratpack	Air Education and Training Command	Nineteenth Air Force	97 AMW	18 November 1942	Altus AFB, Oklahoma	C-17A	ALTUS	
61st Airlift Squadron		Green Hornets	Air Mobility Command	Twenty-First Air Force	19 AW	26 October 1942	Little Rock AFB, Arkansas	C-130J	THE ROCK	
62nd Airlift Squadron		Blue Barons	Air Education and Training Command	Nineteenth Air Force	314 AW	5 December 1942	Little Rock AFB, Arkansas	C-130J	THE ROCK	
65th Airlift Squadron			Pacific Air Forces	Eleventh Air Force	15 WG	12 December 1942	JB Pearl Harbor–Hickam, Hawaii	C-37A		
68th Airlift Squadron			Air Force Reserve Command	Fourth Air Force	433 AW	9 February 1943	JB San Antonio-Lackland (Kelly Field), Texas	C-5M		
73rd Airlift Squadron			Air Force Reserve Command	Twenty-Second Air Force	932 AW	9 February 1943	Scott AFB, Illinois	C-40C		
76th Airlift Squadron			United States Air Forces in Europe – Air Forces Africa	Third Air Force	86 AW	8 February 1943	Ramstein AB, Germany	C-21A; C-37A		
89th Airlift Squadron			Air Force Reserve Command	Fourth Air Force	445 AW	1 June 1943	Wright-Patterson AFB, Ohio	C-17A		
96th Airlift Squadron		Flying Vikings	Air Force Reserve Command	Twenty-Second Air Force	934 AW	1 July 1943	Minneapolis–Saint Paul JARS, Minnesota	C-130H3		
97th Airlift Squadron			Air Force Reserve Command	Fourth Air Force	446 AW	1 July 1943	JB Lewis–McChord, Washington	TFI Reserve Associate to 4 AS, 7 AS, 8 AS		
99th Airlift Squadron		SAM Fox	Air Mobility Command	Eighteenth Air Force	89 AW	1 August 1943	JB Andrews, Maryland	C-37A; C-37B		
109th Airlift Squadron			Air National Guard, Minnesota		133 AW	27 August 1917	Minneapolis–Saint Paul JARS, Minnesota	C-130H3	Minnesota	Awaiting C-130J circa 2027
115th Airlift Squadron		Hollywood Guard	Air National Guard, California		146 AW	28 August 1917	Channel Islands ANGS, California	C-130J	Channel Islands	
118th Airlift Squadron		Flying Yankees	Air National Guard, Connecticut		103 AW	31 August 1917	Bradley ANGB, Connecticut	C-130H3		Awaiting C-130J circa 2027
130th Airlift Squadron		Mountaineers in Green	Air National Guard, West Virginia		130 AW	1 October 1955	Charleston ANGB, West Virginia	C-130J-30		
137th Airlift Squadron			Air National Guard, New York		105 AW	10 August 1943	Stewart ANGB, New York	C-17A		
139th Airlift Squadron			Air National Guard, New York		109 AW	23 July 1942	Stratton ANGB, New York	LC-130H		
142nd Airlift Squadron			Air National Guard, Delaware		166 AW	30 September 1942	New Castle ANGB, Delaware	C-130H3		
143rd Airlift Squadron			Air National Guard, Rhode Island		143 AW	21 August 1939	Quonset Point ANGS, Rhode Island	C-130J-30		
144th Airlift Squadron			Air National Guard, Alaska		176 WG	15 September 1952	JB Elmendorf–Richardson, Alaska	C-17A	AK	
155th Airlift Squadron		Memphis Belle	Air National Guard, Tennessee		164 AW	8 December 1942	Memphis ANGB, Tennessee	C-17A		
156th Airlift Squadron			Air National Guard, North Carolina		145 AW	12 December 1942	Charlotte ANGB, North Carolina	C-17A		
158th Airlift Squadron		Dawgs	Air National Guard, Georgia		165 AW	1 October 1942	Savannah ANGB, Georgia	C-130J-30	Savannah	
165th Airlift Squadron			Air National Guard, Kentucky		123 AW	15 January 1943	Louisville ANGB, Kentucky	C-130J	KENTUCKY	
167th Airlift Squadron			Air National Guard, West Virginia		167 AW	15 January 1943	Shepherd Field ANGB, West Virginia	C-17A		
169th Airlift Squadron			Air National Guard, Illinois		182 AW	23 July 1942	Peoria ANGB, Illinois	C-130H3		Awaiting C-130J circa 2026
180th Airlift Squadron			Air National Guard, Missouri		139 AW	26 June 1942	Rosecrans ANGB, Missouri	C-130H2.5		
181st Airlift Squadron			Air National Guard, Texas		136 AW	1 June 1943	NAS JRB Fort Worth, Texas	C-130J		
183rd Airlift Squadron		Flying Jumbos	Air National Guard, Mississippi		172 AW	1 July 1953	Allen C. Thompson Field ANGB, Mississippi	C-17A		
186th Airlift Squadron		Vigilantes	Air National Guard, Montana		120 AW	15 July 1943	Great Falls ANGB, Montana	C-130H3		Awaiting C-130J circa 2027
187th Airlift Squadron		Cowboy Guard	Air National Guard, Wyoming		153 AW	1 July 1943	Cheyenne ANGB, Wyoming	C-130H2/3		Awaiting C-130J circa 2028
192nd Airlift Squadron		High Rollers	Air National Guard, Nevada		152 AW	15 October 1943	Reno ANGB, Nevada	C-130H2/3	HIGH ROLLERS	
201st Airlift Squadron			Air National Guard, District of Columbia		113 WG	20 June 1992	JB Andrews, Maryland	C-40C		
204th Airlift Squadron		Na Manu Ikaika	Air National Guard, Hawaii		154 WG	31 October 1994	JB Pearl Harbor–Hickam, Hawaii	TFI Reserve Associate to 535 AS		
300th Airlift Squadron		South Carolina Volunteers	Air Force Reserve Command	Fourth Air Force	315 AW	21 June 1943	JB Charleston, South Carolina	TFI Reserve Associate to 14 AS, 15 AS, 16 AS		
301st Airlift Squadron			Air Force Reserve Command	Fourth Air Force	349 AMW	1 August 1943	Travis AFB, California	TFI Reserve Associate to 21 AS		
312th Airlift Squadron			Air Force Reserve Command	Fourth Air Force	349 AMW	1 November 1943	Travis AFB, California	TFI Reserve Associate to 22 AS		
313th Airlift Squadron			Air Force Reserve Command	Fourth Air Force	446 AW	1 November 1943	JB Lewis–McChord, Washington	TFI Reserve Associate to 4 AS, 7 AS, 8 AS		
317th Airlift Squadron			Air Force Reserve Command	Fourth Air Force	315 AW	28 October 1943	JB Charleston, South Carolina	TFI Reserve Associate to 14 AS, 15 AS, 16 AS		
326th Airlift Squadron		Killer Bunnies	Air Force Reserve Command	Fourth Air Force	512 AW	15 April 1944	Dover AFB, Delaware	TFI Reserve Associate to 3 AS		
327th Airlift Squadron			Air Force Reserve Command	Twenty-Second Air Force	913 AG	15 April 1944	Little Rock AFB, Arkansas	TFI Reserve Associate to 41 AS, 61 AS		
337th Airlift Squadron			Air Force Reserve Command	Fourth Air Force	439 AW	26 June 1949	Westover ARB, Massachusetts	C-5M		
356th Airlift Squadron			Air Force Reserve Command	Fourth Air Force	433 AW	1 June 1942	JB San Antonio-Lackland (Kelly Field), Texas	C-5M		
458th Airlift Squadron			Air Mobility Command	Eighteenth Air Force	375 AMW	6 July 1942	Scott AFB, Illinois	C-21A	SCOTT FIELD	
459th Airlift Squadron		Centaurs	Pacific Air Forces	Fifth Air Force	374 AW	6 July 1942	Yokota AB, Japan	C-12J		
517th Airlift Squadron		Firebirds	Pacific Air Forces	Eleventh Air Force	3 WG	11 December 1940	JB Elmendorf–Richardson, Alaska	TFI Active Associate to 144 AS		
517th Airlift Squadron		Firebirds	Pacific Air Forces	Eleventh Air Force	3 WG	11 December 1940	JB Elmendorf–Richardson, Alaska	C-12F	None	
535th Airlift Squadron			Pacific Air Forces	Eleventh Air Force	15 WG	1 October 1943	JB Pearl Harbor–Hickam, Hawaii	C-17A	HH	
700th Airlift Squadron			Air Force Reserve Command	Twenty-Second Air Force	94 AW	1 April 1943	Dobbins ARB, Georgia	C-130H3	DOBBINS	
701st Airlift Squadron			Air Force Reserve Command	Fourth Air Force	315 AW	1 April 1943	JB Charleston, South Carolina	TFI Reserve Associate to 14 AS, 15 AS, 16 AS		
709th Airlift Squadron			Air Force Reserve Command	Fourth Air Force	512 AW	1 May 1943	Dover AFB, Delaware	TFI Reserve Associate to 9 AS		
728th Airlift Squadron		Flying Knights	Air Force Reserve Command	Fourth Air Force	446 AW	1 June 1943	JB Lewis–McChord, Washington	TFI Reserve Associate to 4 AS, 7 AS, 8 AS		
729th Airlift Squadron			Air Force Reserve Command	Fourth Air Force	452 AMW	1 June 1943	March ARB, California	C-17A		
731st Airlift Squadron			Air Force Reserve Command	Twenty-Second Air Force	302 AW	15 June 1942	Peterson SFB, Colorado	C-130H3		
732nd Airlift Squadron			Air Force Reserve Command	Fourth Air Force	514 AMW	15 June 1942	JB McGuire–Dix–Lakehurst, New Jersey	TFI Reserve Associate to 6 AS		
757th Airlift Squadron		Blue Tigers	Air Force Reserve Command	Twenty-Second Air Force	910 AW	1 July 1943	Youngstown ARS, Ohio	C-130H2; C-130J-30		Transition to C-130J-30 underway
758th Airlift Squadron			Air Force Reserve Command	Fourth Air Force	911 AW	1 July 1943	Pittsburgh IAP ARS, Pennsylvania	C-17A	PITTSBURGH	
815th Airlift Squadron		Flying Jennies	Air Force Reserve Command	Twenty-Second Air Force	403 WG	20 September 1943	Keesler AFB, Mississippi	C-130J-30	FLYING JENNIES	
Presidential Airlift Squadron			Air Mobility Command	Eighteenth Air Force	89 AW (Presidential Airlift Group)	1 April 2001	JB Andrews, Maryland	VC-25A; VC-25B		

== Attack Squadrons (ATKS) ==
Squadron Name	Insignia	Nickname	Command	Air Force	Wing	Date First Activated	Base	Aircraft	Tail Code (Note: MQ-9A tailflashes are blank while deployed operationally.)	Notes
6th Attack Squadron		The Hawks	Air Combat Command	Fifteenth Air Force	49 WG	1 August 1943	Holloman AFB, New Mexico	MQ-9A	HO	(Note: Conducts MQ-9A Mission Control Element (MCE) and Satellite Launch & Recovery (SLR) operations from Ground Control Stations (GCSs) on this installation. MQ-9A airframes themselves are also based at this location.)
9th Attack Squadron		Flying Knights	Air Combat Command	Fifteenth Air Force	49 WG	15 January 1941	Holloman AFB, New Mexico	MQ-9A	HO	
11th Attack Squadron		Owls	Air Combat Command	Fifteenth Air Force	25 ATKW	2 March 1942	Creech AFB, Nevada	MQ-9A	CH	
15th Attack Squadron		Pigeons	Air Combat Command	Fifteenth Air Force	432 WG (732 OG)	9 May 1917	Creech AFB, Nevada	MQ-9A	CH	
17th Attack Squadron		Bulls	Air Combat Command	Fifteenth Air Force	432 WG (732 OG)	23 July 1942	Creech AFB, Nevada	MQ-9A	CH	
20th Attack Squadron		Hellhounds	Air Combat Command	Fifteenth Air Force	25 ATKW	15 December 1940	Whiteman AFB, Missouri	MQ-9A	WM (Note: Tailflashes for units where MQ-9A airframes are not primarily based are temporary and largely symbolic.)	(Note: Conducts MQ-9A Mission Control Element (MCE) and Satellite Launch & Recovery (SLR) operations from Ground Control Stations (GCSs) on this installation. MQ-9A airframes themselves are not primarily based at this location.)
22nd Attack Squadron		Demon Eagles	Air Combat Command	Fifteenth Air Force	432 WG (732 OG)	15 January 1941	Creech AFB, Nevada	MQ-9A	CH	
29th Attack Squadron		Ghost Warriors	Air Combat Command	Fifteenth Air Force	49 WG	10 March 1942	Holloman AFB, New Mexico	MQ-9A	HO	
42nd Attack Squadron		Death Dealers; Fourty-Deuce	Air Combat Command	Fifteenth Air Force	25 ATKW	18 September 2025	Creech AFB, Nevada	MQ-9A	CH	
50th Attack Squadron		Wildcats	Air Combat Command	Fifteenth Air Force	25 ATKW	6 August 1917	Shaw AFB, South Carolina	MQ-9A	SW	
78th Attack Squadron		Bushmasters	Air Force Reserve Command	Tenth Air Force	926 WG (726 OG)	28 February 1918	Creech AFB, Nevada	TFI Reserve Associate to 15 ATKS, 22 ATKS		
89th Attack Squadron		Marauders	Air Combat Command	Fifteenth Air Force	25 ATKW	19 August 1917	Ellsworth AFB, South Dakota	MQ-9A	EL	
91st Attack Squadron		Blue Streaks	Air Force Reserve Command	Tenth Air Force	926 WG (726 OG)	9 February 1942	Creech AFB, Nevada	TFI Reserve Associate to 17 ATKS, 867 ATKS		
103rd Attack Squadron		The Fightin’ 103rd	Air National Guard, Pennsylvania		111 ATKW	27 June 1924	Biddle ANGB, Pennsylvania	MQ-9A	PA	
105th Attack Squadron		Old Hickory Squadron	Air National Guard, Tennessee		118 WG	27 August 1917	Berry Field ANGB, Tennessee	MQ-9A	TN	
108th Attack Squadron		Bats	Air National Guard, New York		174 ATKW	22 November 1948	Hancock Field ANGB, New York	MQ-9A	NY	
111th Attack Squadron		Ace In The Hole	Air National Guard, Texas		147 ATKW	14 August 1917	Ellington Field JRB, Texas	MQ-9A	TX	
124th Attack Squadron		Hawkeyes	Air National Guard, Iowa		132 WG	25 February 1941	Des Moines ANGB, Iowa	MQ-9A	IA	
136th Attack Squadron		New York's Finest	Air National Guard, New York		107 ATKW	10 August 1943	Niagara Falls ARS, New York	MQ-9A		
138th Attack Squadron		The Boys from Syracuse	Air National Guard, New York		174 ATKW	10 August 1942	Hancock Field ANGB, New York	MQ-9A	NY	
160th Attack Squadron			Air National Guard, California		163 ATKW		March ARB, California	MQ-9A	CA	
162nd Attack Squadron		Sabres	Air National Guard, Ohio		178 WG	1 December 1942	Springfield ANGB, Ohio	MQ-9A		
172nd Attack Squadron		Cereal Killers	Air National Guard, Michigan		110 WG	10 February 1943	Battle Creek ANGB, Michigan	MQ-9A	BC	
178th Attack Squadron		Happy Hooligans	Air National Guard, North Dakota		119 WG	15 July 1943	Fargo ANGB, North Dakota	MQ-9A	ND	
184th Attack Squadron		Flying Razorbacks	Air National Guard, Arkansas		188 WG	15 October 1953	Ebbing ANGB, Arkansas	MQ-9A		
196th Attack Squadron		Grizzlys	Air National Guard, California		163 ATKW	15 August 1943	March ARB, California	MQ-9A	CA	
214th Attack Squadron		Black Sheep	Air National Guard, Arizona		162 WG (214 ATKG)	29 August 2007	Davis–Monthan AFB, Arizona	MQ-9A		
429th Attack Squadron		Hunters	Air Force Reserve Command	Tenth Air Force	926 WG (726 OG)	June 1917	Holloman AFB, New Mexico	TFI Reserve Associate to 6 ATKS, 9 ATKS, 29 ATKS		
482nd Attack Squadron		Warriors	Air Combat Command	Fifteenth Air Force	25 ATKW	13 August 1917	Shaw AFB, South Carolina	MQ-9A	SW	(Note: Conducts MQ-9A Launch & Recovery Element (LRE) operations from Ground Control Stations (GCSs) on this installation and deployed locations across the globe. Unit awaiting a change in mission or inactivation once MQ-9A Satellite Launch & Recovery (SLR) becomes fully operational. MQ-9A airframes themselves are not primarily based at this location.)
489th Attack Squadron			Air Combat Command	Fifteenth Air Force	432 WG	13 August 1917	Creech AFB, Nevada	MQ-9A	CH	(Note: Conducts MQ-9A Launch & Recovery Element (LRE) operations from Ground Control Stations (GCSs) on this installation and deployed locations across the globe. MQ-9A airframes themselves are also based at this location.)
491st Attack Squadron		Ringers	Air Combat Command	Fifteenth Air Force	49 WG	15 August 1917	Hancock Field ANGB, New York	TFI Active Associate to 108 ATKS		
492nd Attack Squadron		Fightin' Bees	Air Combat Command	Fifteenth Air Force	49 WG	15 August 1917	March ARB, California	TFI Active Associate to 160 ATKS		
867th Attack Squadron		Spartans	Air Combat Command	Fifteenth Air Force	432 WG (732 OG)	21 August 1917	Creech AFB, Nevada	MQ-9A	CH	

== Bomb Squadrons (BS) ==
Squadron Name	Insignia	Nickname	Command	Air Force	Wing	Date First Activated	Base	Aircraft	Tail Code	Notes
9th Bomb Squadron		Bats	Air Force Global Strike Command	Eighth Air Force	7 BW	14 June 1917	Dyess AFB, Texas	B-1B	DY	
11th Bomb Squadron		The Mr. Jiggs Squadron	Air Force Global Strike Command	Eighth Air Force	2 BW	26 June 1917	Barksdale AFB, Louisiana	TFI Active Associate to 93rd BS (Note: Non-standard Formal Training Unit (FTU) / Initial Qualification Training (IQT) "B-Course" unit. All sortie generation and the majority of instruction is provided by the AFRC 93rd Bomb Squadron, although students are assigned to the Active Duty 11th Bomb Squadron.)		
13th Bomb Squadron		The Devil's Own Grim Reapers	Air Force Global Strike Command	Eighth Air Force	509 BW	14 June 1917	Whiteman AFB, Missouri	B-2A; T-38A	WM	(Note: Combined Initial Qualification Training (IQT) / "B-Course", Mission Qualification Training (MQT), and Combat Mission-Ready (CMR) operational unit for this airframe.)
20th Bomb Squadron		Buccaneers	Air Force Global Strike Command	Eighth Air Force	2 BW	26 June 1917	Barksdale AFB, Louisiana	B-52H	LA	
23rd Bomb Squadron		Bomber Barons	Air Force Global Strike Command	Eighth Air Force	5 BW	16 June 1917	Minot AFB, North Dakota	B-52H	MT	
28th Bomb Squadron		Mohawks	Air Force Global Strike Command	Eighth Air Force	7 BW	22 June 1917	Dyess AFB, Texas	B-1B	DY	
34th Bomb Squadron		Thunderbirds	Air Force Global Strike Command	Eighth Air Force	28 BW	11 June 1917	Ellsworth AFB, South Dakota	B-1B	EL	
37th Bomb Squadron		Tigers	Air Force Global Strike Command	Eighth Air Force	28 BW	13 June 1917	Ellsworth AFB, South Dakota	B-1B	EL	
69th Bomb Squadron		Knighthawks	Air Force Global Strike Command	Eighth Air Force	5 BW	29 November 1940	Minot AFB, North Dakota	B-52H	MT	
93rd Bomb Squadron		Outlaws; Scalp Hunters	Air Force Reserve Command	Tenth Air Force	307 BW	21 August 1917	Barksdale AFB, Louisiana	B-52H	BD	(Note: Also provides all sortie generation to 49 TES, 340 WPS.)
96th Bomb Squadron		Red Devils	Air Force Global Strike Command	Eighth Air Force	2 BW	20 August 1917	Barksdale AFB, Louisiana	B-52H	LA	
110th Bomb Squadron		Lindbergh's Own; Stealth Militia	Air National Guard, Missouri		131 BW	14 Aug 1917	Whiteman AFB, Missouri	TFI Reserve Associate to 13 BS, 393 BS		
343rd Bomb Squadron		Couldn't Care Less; Avengers	Air Force Reserve Command	Tenth Air Force	307 BW	28 January 1942	Barksdale AFB, Louisiana	TFI Reserve Associate to 20 BS, 96 BS		
345th Bomb Squadron		Crooks	Air Force Reserve Command	Tenth Air Force	307 BW (489 BG)	3 February 1942	Dyess AFB, Texas	TFI Reserve Associate to 9 BS		
393rd Bomb Squadron		Tigers	Air Force Global Strike Command	Eighth Air Force	509 BW	11 March 1944	Whiteman AFB, Missouri	B-2A; T-38A	WM	

== Combat Training Squadrons (CTS) ==
Squadron Name	Insignia	Nickname	Command	Air Force	Wing	Date First Activated	Base	Aircraft	Tail Code	Notes
334th Combat Training Squadron			Air Force Global Strike Command	Eighth Air Force	95 WG (NAOC)	28 August 2026	Offutt AFB, Nebraska	E-4B	B	(Note: Dedicated Mission Qualification Training (MQT) unit for this airframe.)
338th Combat Training Squadron		Topcats	Air Combat Command	Sixteenth Air Force	55 WG	12 September 1942	Offutt AFB, Nebraska	RC-135S; RC-135U; RC-135V/W; TC-135W	OF	

== Electronic Combat Squadrons (ECS) ==
Squadron Name	Insignia	Nickname	Command	Air Force	Wing	Date First Activated	Base	Aircraft	Tail Code	Notes
41st Electronic Combat Squadron		Scorpions	Air Combat Command	Sixteenth Air Force	55 WG (55 ECG)	13 November 1917	Davis–Monthan AFB, Arizona	EA-37B	DM	
42nd Electronic Combat Squadron		Raptors	Air Combat Command	Sixteenth Air Force	55 WG (55 ECG)	7 November 1945	Davis–Monthan AFB, Arizona	EA-37B	DM	
43rd Electronic Combat Squadron		Bats	Air Combat Command	Sixteenth Air Force	55 WG (55 ECG)	17 August 1917	Davis–Monthan AFB, Arizona	EA-37B	DM	
390th Electronic Combat Squadron		Wild Boars	Air Combat Command	Fifteenth Air Force	366 FW	1 June 1943	NAS Whidbey Island, Washington	Augments five US Navy land based EA-18G Electronic Attack (VAQ) squadrons and the EA-18G Fleet Replacement Squadron (Note: Provides 1 or 2 USAF Pilots/EWOs to each of five U.S. Navy land based (non-aircraft carrier deployable) Electronic Attack (VAQ) squadrons (there is no 390th ECS presence in the nine carrier based VAQ squadrons). Also provides some instructors to the Fleet Replacement Squadron.)		
472nd Electronic Combat Squadron			Air Combat Command	Sixteenth Air Force	319 RW	16 July 1942	Robins AFB, Georgia	E-11A	None	

== Expeditionary Squadrons (Prefix "E") ==
Squadron Name	Insignia	Nickname	Command	Air Force	Wing	Date First Activated	Base	Aircraft	Tail Code	Notes
26th Expeditionary Rescue Squadron			Air Combat Command	Ninth Air Force (AFCENT) (Note: Exercises Operational Control (OPCON) over this Squadron.)	378 AEW	1 September 2015	Prince Sultan AB, Saudi Arabia	HH-60W; HC-130J	(Note: Unit simply provides a supply of permanently-stationed Active Duty aircrew and other support staff. The aircraft flown by this Squadron are not necessarily "owned" by this unit, but when deployed from other units, those aircraft are augmented and supported by this Squadron. In many cases, Squadrons like these are simply a renamed and larger version of a Detachment from their associated Operations Group / Wing / MAJCOM.)	
46th Expeditionary Attack Squadron		Wolfpack	Air Combat Command	Ninth Air Force (AFCENT)	386 AEW	2013	Ali Al Salem AB, Kuwait	MQ-9A		(Note: USAF RPA units contain Launch & Recovery Elements (LREs) and Mission Control Elements (MCEs). Aircrew flying the RPA itself are not necessarily always stationed at the same location as the airframes themselves. Deployed airframes are often controlled by crews stationed thousands of miles away.)
62nd Expeditionary Attack Squadron		Nighthunters; Valkyrie	Air Combat Command	Ninth Air Force (AFCENT)	380 AEW	1 March 1943	Al Dhafra AB, UAE	MQ-9A		
75th Expeditionary Airlift Squadron		Rogue Squadron	United States Air Forces in Europe – Air Forces Africa	Third Air Force	449 AEG		Camp Lemonnier, Djibouti	C-130H; C-130J		
81st Expeditionary Rescue Squadron			United States Air Forces in Europe – Air Forces Africa	Third Air Force	449 AEG		Camp Lemonnier, Djibouti	HC-130J		
99th Expeditionary Reconnaissance Squadron			Air Combat Command	Sixteenth Air Force	9 RW	21 August 1917	RAF Fairford, United Kingdom	U-2S	(Note: Deployment site for aircraft and personnel of the 99th RS.)	
99th Expeditionary Reconnaissance Squadron			Air Combat Command	Sixteenth Air Force	9 RW	21 August 1917	Unnamed Detachment: Al Dhafra AB, UAE	U-2S	(Note: Deployment site for aircraft and personnel of the 99th RS.)	
303rd Expeditionary Rescue Squadron			United States Air Forces in Europe – Air Forces Africa	Third Air Force	449 AEG		Camp Lemonnier, Djibouti	HH-60W		
305th Expeditionary Air Refueling Squadron			Air Combat Command	Ninth Air Force (AFCENT)	379 AEW	2 July 1951	Al Udeid AB, Qatar	KC-46A		
319th Expeditionary Reconnaissance Squadron		Tomcats	Pacific Air Forces	Fifth Air Force	18 WG	23 October 2022	Kadena AB, Japan	MQ-9A	ZZ	
324th Expeditionary Reconnaissance Squadron			United States Air Forces in Europe – Air Forces Africa	Third Air Force	409 AEG	15 April 1942	NAS Sigonella, Italy	MQ-9A		
340th Expeditionary Air Refueling Squadron			Air Combat Command	Ninth Air Force (AFCENT)	379 AEW	30 September 1942	Al Udeid AB, Qatar	KC-135R/T		
430th Expeditionary Electronic Combat Squadron			Air Combat Command	Ninth Air Force (AFCENT)	380 AEW	20 February 2013	Al Dhafra AB, UAE	E-11A		
431st Expeditionary Reconnaissance Squadron			Pacific Air Forces	Seventh Air Force (AFKOR)	8 FW	28 September 2025	Kunsan AB, South Korea	MQ-9A		
506th Expeditionary Aerial Refueling Squadron			Pacific Air Forces	Eleventh Air Force	36 WG		Andersen AFB, Guam	KC-135R/T		
717th Expeditionary Attack Squadron			United States Air Forces in Europe – Air Forces Africa	Third Air Force	31 FW	14 October 2021	Larissa AB, Greece	MQ-9A	(Note: Simply a forward operating location for tails and MX support deployed from other Squadrons.)	
731st Expeditionary Attack Squadron			United States Air Forces in Europe – Air Forces Africa	Third Air Force	31 FW	1 June 1943	Câmpia Turzii AB, Romania	MQ-9A		
763rd Expeditionary Reconnaissance Squadron			Air Combat Command	Ninth Air Force (AFCENT)	379 AEW	13 October 1990	Al Udeid AB, Qatar	RC-135V/W		
Unknown Expeditionary Attack Squadron			Air Combat Command	Ninth Air Force (AFCENT)	332 AEW		Muwaffaq Salti AB, Jordan	MQ-9A		
Unknown Expeditionary Airlift Squadron			Air Combat Command	Ninth Air Force (AFCENT)	386 AEW		Ali Al Salem AB, Kuwait	C-130H; C-130J		
Unknown Expeditionary Reconnaissance Squadron			Air Combat Command	Ninth Air Force (AFCENT)	380 AEW		Al Dhafra AB, UAE	U-2S		

== Fighter Interceptor Squadrons (FIS) ==
Squadron Name	Insignia	Nickname	Command	Air Force	Wing	Date First Activated	Base	Aircraft	Tail Code
18th Fighter Interceptor Squadron		Blue Foxes	Pacific Air Forces	Eleventh Air Force	354 FW	1 February 1940	Eielson AFB, Alaska (Note: Unit performs 24/7 Aerospace Control Alert (ACA) mission from this facility under OPCON of ANR in support of Operation NOBLE EAGLE.)	F-16C/D	AK

== Fighter Squadrons (FS) ==
Squadron Name	Insignia	Nickname	Command	Air Force	Wing	Date First Activated	Base	Aircraft	Tail Code	Notes
4th Fighter Squadron		Fighting Fuujins	Air Combat Command	Fifteenth Air Force	388 FW	15 January 1941	Hill AFB, Utah	F-35A	HL	
8th Fighter Squadron		Black Sheep	Air Combat Command	Fifteenth Air Force	49 WG (54 FG)	15 January 1941	Holloman AFB, New Mexico	F-16C/D (Block 40)	HO	
13th Fighter Squadron		Panthers	Pacific Air Forces	Fifth Air Force	35 FW	1 February 1942	Misawa AB, Japan	F-16C/D (Block 50); F-35A	WW	Transition to F-35A underway
14th Fighter Squadron		Fighting Samurai	Pacific Air Forces	Fifth Air Force	35 FW	20 June 1942	Misawa AB, Japan	F-16C/D (Block 50)	WW	Awaiting F-35A circa 2028
19th Fighter Squadron		Gamecocks	Pacific Air Forces	Eleventh Air Force	15 WG	14 June 1917	JB Pearl Harbor–Hickam, Hawaii	TFI Active Associate to 199 FS		
21st Fighter Squadron		Gamblers	Air National Guard, Arizona		162 WG	15 October 1944	Morris ANGB, Arizona	F-16A/V	None	(Note: Conducts formal training for international aircrew under the Foreign Military Sales (FMS) program.)
24th Fighter Squadron		Leaping Tigers	Air Combat Command	Fifteenth Air Force	495 FG	c. June 1917	NAS JRB Fort Worth, Texas	TFI Active Associate to 457 FS		
27th Fighter Squadron		Fightin' Eagles	Air Combat Command	Fifteenth Air Force	1 FW	8 May 1917	JB Langley–Eustis, Virginia	F-22A	FF	
34th Fighter Squadron		Rude Rams	Air Combat Command	Fifteenth Air Force	388 FW	15 October 1944	Hill AFB, Utah	F-35A	HL	
35th Fighter Squadron		Pantons	Pacific Air Forces	Seventh Air Force (AFKOR)	8 FW	12 June 1917	Kunsan AB, South Korea	F-16C/D (Block 40)	WP	Awaiting Block 50s circa 2026
36th Fighter Squadron		Fiends	Pacific Air Forces	Seventh Air Force (AFKOR)	51 FW	12 June 1917	Osan AB, South Korea	F-16C/D (Block 40)	OS	Awaiting Block 50s circa 2026
44th Fighter Squadron		Vampires	Pacific Air Forces	Fifth Air Force	18 WG	1 January 1941	Kadena AB, Japan	Awaiting F-15EX delivery circa 2027		
52nd Fighter Squadron		Ninjas	Air Force Reserve Command	Tenth Air Force	944 FW	1 January 1941	Luke AFB, Arizona	TFI Reserve Associate to 61 FS, 62 FS, 63 FS, 312 FS		
53rd Fighter Squadron		Capital Tigers	Air Combat Command	Fifteenth Air Force	495 FG	1 January 1941	JB Andrews, Maryland	TFI Active Associate to 121 FS		
55th Fighter Squadron		The Fighting Fifty-Fifth; Shooters	Air Combat Command	Fifteenth Air Force	20 FW	9 August 1917	Shaw AFB, South Carolina	F-16C/D (Block 50)	SW	Awaiting inactivation circa 2026
57th Fighter Squadron		Black Knights	Air Combat Command	Fifteenth Air Force	33 FW (85 FG)	15 January 1941	Ebbing ANGB, Arkansas	F-35A	EG	
58th Fighter Squadron		Mighty Gorillas	Air Combat Command	Fifteenth Air Force	33 FW	15 January 1941	Eglin AFB, Florida	F-35A	EG	
60th Fighter Squadron		Fighting Crows	Air Combat Command	Fifteenth Air Force	33 FW	15 January 1941	Eglin AFB, Florida	F-35A	EG	
61st Fighter Squadron		Top Dogs	Air Combat Command	Fifteenth Air Force	56 FW	15 January 1941	Luke AFB, Arizona	F-35A	LF	
62nd Fighter Squadron		Spikes	Air Combat Command	Fifteenth Air Force	56 FW	15 January 1941	Luke AFB, Arizona	F-35A	LF	(Note: Conducts both Formal Training Unit (FTU) / Initial Qualification Training (IQT) "B-Course" duties for USAF aircrew, along with formal training for international aircrew under the Foreign Military Sales (FMS) program.)
63rd Fighter Squadron		Panthers	Air Combat Command	Fifteenth Air Force	56 FW	15 January 1941	Luke AFB, Arizona	F-35A	LF	
67th Fighter Squadron		Fighting Cocks	Pacific Air Forces	Fifth Air Force	18 WG	15 January 1941	Kadena AB, Japan	Awaiting F-15EX delivery circa 2027		
69th Fighter Squadron		Werewolves	Air Force Reserve Command	Tenth Air Force	944 FW	15 January 1941	Luke AFB, Arizona	TFI Reserve Associate to 308 FS, 309 FS, 310 FS, 425 FS		
71st Fighter Squadron		Ironmen	Air Combat Command	Fifteenth Air Force	1 FW	1 January 1941	JB Langley–Eustis, Virginia	F-22A	FF	
74th Fighter Squadron		Flying Tigers	Air Combat Command	Fifteenth Air Force	23 WG (23 FG)	4 July 1942	Moody AFB, Georgia	A-10C	FT	Awaiting F-35A circa 2030
75th Fighter Squadron		Tiger Sharks	Air Combat Command	Fifteenth Air Force	23 WG (23 FG)	4 July 1942	Moody AFB, Georgia	A-10C	FT	Awaiting F-35A circa 2032
76th Fighter Squadron		Vanguards	Air Force Reserve Command	Tenth Air Force	442 FW (476 FG)	4 July 1942	Moody AFB, Georgia	TFI Reserve Associate to 74 FS, 75 FS		
77th Fighter Squadron		The Gamblers	Air Combat Command	Fifteenth Air Force	20 FW	20 February 1918	Shaw AFB, South Carolina	F-16C/D (Block 50)	SW	
79th Fighter Squadron		Tigers	Air Combat Command	Fifteenth Air Force	20 FW	22 February 1918	Shaw AFB, South Carolina	F-16C/D (Block 50)	SW	
80th Fighter Squadron		Headhunters; Juvats	Pacific Air Forces	Seventh Air Force (AFKOR)	8 FW	10 January 1942	Kunsan AB, South Korea	F-16C/D (Block 40)	WP	Awaiting Block 50s circa 2028
90th Fighter Squadron		Dicemen	Pacific Air Forces	Eleventh Air Force	3 WG	20 August 1917	JB Elmendorf–Richardson, Alaska	F-22A	AK	
93rd Fighter Squadron		Makos	Air Force Reserve Command	Tenth Air Force	482 FW	1 June 1943	Homestead ARB, Florida	F-16C/D (Block 30)	FM	
94th Fighter Squadron		Hat in the Ring	Air Combat Command	Fifteenth Air Force	1 FW	20 August 1917	JB Langley–Eustis, Virginia	F-22A	FF	
95th Fighter Squadron		Boneheads	Air Combat Command	Fifteenth Air Force	325 FW	9 February 1942	Tyndall AFB, Florida	F-35A	TY	
100th Fighter Squadron		Red Tails	Air National Guard, Alabama		187 FW	19 February 1942	Montgomery ANGB, Alabama	F-35A	AL	(Note: Provides aircraft for the F-35A's ANG AFRC Test Center (AATC) Combined Test Force (CTF) "test detachment" located at Eglin AFB, Florida, utilizing maintenance personnel from the 95th Fighter Generation Squadron located at Tyndall AFB, FL.)
107th Fighter Squadron		The Red Devils	Air National Guard, Michigan		127 WG	27 August 1917	Selfridge ANGB, Michigan	A-10C	MI	Awaiting F-15EX circa 2028
112th Fighter Squadron		Stingers	Air National Guard, Ohio		180 FW	18 August 1917	Toledo ANGB, Ohio	F-16C/D (Block 42)	OH	
114th Fighter Squadron		The Land of No Slack	Air National Guard, Oregon		173 FW	26 June 1942	Kingsley Field ANGB, Oregon	Awaiting F-35A circa 2027		
119th Fighter Squadron		Jersey Devils	Air National Guard, New Jersey		177 FW	5 June 1917	Atlantic City ANGB, New Jersey	F-16C/D (Block 30)	AC	(Note: This unit is on 24/7 Aerospace Control Alert (ACA) at this facility under OPCON of CONR in support of Operation NOBLE EAGLE.); Awaiting Block 40s circa 2026
120th Fighter Squadron		Colorado Cougars; Redeyes; Mile High Militia	Air National Guard, Colorado		140 WG	28 August 1917	Buckley Space Force Base, Colorado	F-16C/D (Block 30)	CO	
121st Fighter Squadron		Capital Guardians	Air National Guard, District of Columbia		113 WG	10 April 1941	JB Andrews, Maryland	F-16C/D (Block 30)	DC	Awaiting Block 40s circa 2026
122nd Fighter Squadron		Bayou Militia	Air National Guard, Louisiana		159 FW	2 March 1941	NAS JRB New Orleans, Louisiana	F-15C/D	JZ	Awaiting F-15EX circa 2027
123rd Fighter Squadron		Redhawks	Air National Guard, Oregon		142 WG	18 April 1941	Portland ANGB, Oregon	F-15C/D; F-15EX	OR	Transition to F-15EX underway
125th Fighter Squadron		Tulsa Vipers The Tribe	Air National Guard, Oklahoma		138 FW	10 February 1941	Tulsa ANGB, Oklahoma	F-16C/D (Block 42)	OK	
131st Fighter Squadron		Barnestormers; Massholes	Air National Guard, Massachusetts		104 FW	23 August 1942	Barnes ANGB, Massachusetts	F-35A	MA	Transition to F-35A underway
134th Fighter Squadron		Green Mountain Boys; Yellow Scorpions	Air National Guard, Vermont		158 FW	2 March 1942	Burlington ANGB, Vermont	F-35A	VT	
149th Fighter Squadron		Blue Nosed Bastards	Air National Guard, Virginia		192 WG	1 October 1942	JB Langley–Eustis, Virginia	TFI Reserve Associate to 27 FS, 71 FS, 94 FS, 7 FTS		
152nd Fighter Squadron		El Tigres Los Vaqueros	Air National Guard, Arizona		162 WG	13 October 1939	Morris ANGB, Arizona	F-16C/D (Block 42)	AZ	
157th Fighter Squadron		Swamp Fox	Air National Guard, South Carolina		169 FW	1 October 1942	McEntire JNGB, South Carolina	F-16C/D (Block 52)	SOUTH CAROLINA	
159th Fighter Squadron		Boxin' Gators "The Fang"	Air National Guard, Florida		125 FW	1 October 1942	Jacksonville ANGB, Florida	F-35A		
163rd Fighter Squadron		Blacksnakes	Air National Guard, Indiana		122 FW	1 January 1943	Fort Wayne ANGB, Indiana	F-16C/D (Block 40)	IN	
175th Fighter Squadron		Lobos	Air National Guard, South Dakota		114 FW	15 May 1943	Joe Foss Field, South Dakota	F-16C/D (Block 40)	SD	
176th Fighter Squadron		Badger Air Militia; Raggedy Ass Militia	Air National Guard, Wisconsin		115 FW	22 July 1942	Truax Field ANGB, Wisconsin	F-35A	WI	
179th Fighter Squadron		Bulldogs	Air National Guard, Minnesota		148 FW	15 July 1943	Duluth ANGB, Minnesota	F-16C/D (Block 50)	DULUTH	
182nd Fighter Squadron		Lonestar Gunfighters	Air National Guard, Texas		149 FW	1 June 1943	JB San Antonio-Lackland (Kelly Field), Texas	F-16C/D (Block 30)	SA	
190th Fighter Squadron		Skullbangers	Air National Guard, Idaho		124 FW	15 July 1943	Gowen Field ANGB, Idaho	A-10C	ID	Awaiting Block 40 F-16C/D circa 2027
194th Fighter Squadron		Griffins	Air National Guard, California		144 FW	15 October 1943	Fresno ANGB, California	F-15C/D	FRESNO	Awaiting F-15EX circa 2031
195th Fighter Squadron		Warhawks	Air National Guard, Arizona		162 WG	15 August 1943	Morris ANGB, Arizona	F-16C/D (Block 30)	AZ	Awaiting Block 40s circa 2032
195th Fighter Squadron		Warhawks	Air National Guard, Arizona		162 WG	15 August 1943	Morris ANGB, Arizona	F-16V (Block 70)	None	
199th Fighter Squadron		Mytai Fighters "The Hang"	Air National Guard, Hawaii		154 WG	12 October 1944	JB Pearl Harbor–Hickam, Hawaii	F-22A	HH	
301st Fighter Squadron		Kats	Air Force Reserve Command	Tenth Air Force	44 FG	13 October 1942	Tyndall AFB, Florida	TFI Reserve Associate to 95 FS		
302nd Fighter Squadron		Hellions	Air Force Reserve Command	Tenth Air Force	477 FG	13 October 1942	JB Elmendorf–Richardson, Alaska	TFI Reserve Associate to 90 FS, 525 FS		
303rd Fighter Squadron		KC Hawgs	Air Force Reserve Command	Tenth Air Force	442 FW	1 September 1943	Whiteman AFB, Missouri	A-10C	KC	Awaiting F-15E circa 2031
306th Fighter Squadron			Air Combat Command	Fifteenth Air Force	495 FG	25 September 1957	Atlantic City ANGB, New Jersey	TFI Active Associate to 119 FS		
307th Fighter Squadron		Stingers	Air Force Reserve Command	Tenth Air Force	944 FW (414 FG)	30 January 1942	Seymour Johnson AFB, North Carolina	TFI Reserve Associate to 333 FS, 334 FS		
308th Fighter Squadron		Emerald Knights	Air Combat Command	Fifteenth Air Force	56 FW	30 January 1942	Luke AFB, Arizona	F-35A	LF	
309th Fighter Squadron		Wild Ducks; Mad Mallards from Hell	Air Combat Command	Fifteenth Air Force	56 FW	30 January 1942	Luke AFB, Arizona	Awaiting F-35A delivery circa 2026		
310th Fighter Squadron		Top Hats	Air Combat Command	Fifteenth Air Force	56 FW	9 February 1942	Luke AFB, Arizona	F-35A	LF	
311th Fighter Squadron		Sidewinders	Air Combat Command	Fifteenth Air Force	49 WG (54 FG)	9 February 1942	Holloman AFB, New Mexico	F-16C/D (Block 40)	HO	
312th Fighter Squadron		Scorpions	Air Combat Command	Fifteenth Air Force	56 FW	22 July 1942	Luke AFB, Arizona	F-35A	LF	
314th Fighter Squadron		Warhawks	Air Combat Command	Fifteenth Air Force	49 WG (54 FG)	6 July 1942	Holloman AFB, New Mexico	F-16C/D (Block 40)	HO	
315th Fighter Squadron			Air Combat Command	Fifteenth Air Force	495 FG	6 July 1942	Burlington ANGB, Vermont	TFI Active Associate to 134 FS		
316th Fighter Squadron		Hell’s Belles	Air Combat Command	Fifteenth Air Force	495 FG	6 July 1942	McEntire JNGB, South Carolina	TFI Active Associate to 157 FS		
333rd Fighter Squadron		Lancers	Air Combat Command	Fifteenth Air Force	4 FW	8 December 1957	Seymour Johnson AFB, North Carolina	F-15E (PW-220)	SJ	Awaiting inactivation circa 2026
334th Fighter Squadron		Fighting Eagles	Air Combat Command	Fifteenth Air Force	4 FW	12 September 1942	Seymour Johnson AFB, North Carolina	F-15E (PW-220)	SJ	
335th Fighter Squadron		Chiefs	Air Combat Command	Fifteenth Air Force	4 FW	12 September 1942	Seymour Johnson AFB, North Carolina	F-15E (PW-220)	SJ	
336th Fighter Squadron		Rocketeers	Air Combat Command	Fifteenth Air Force	4 FW	12 September 1942	Seymour Johnson AFB, North Carolina	F-15E (PW-220)	SJ	Awaiting inactivation
355th Fighter Squadron		Fighting Falcons	Pacific Air Forces	Eleventh Air Force	354 FW	15 November 1942	Eielson AFB, Alaska	F-35A	AK	
356th Fighter Squadron		Green Demons	Pacific Air Forces	Eleventh Air Force	354 FW	15 November 1942	Eielson AFB, Alaska	F-35A	AK	
358th Fighter Squadron		Lobos	Air Combat Command	Fifteenth Air Force	495 FG	12 November 1942	Gowen Field ANGB, Idaho	TFI Active Associate to 190 FS		
358th Fighter Squadron		Lobos	Air Combat Command	Fifteenth Air Force	495 FG	12 November 1942	Selfridge ANGB, Michigan	TFI Active Associate to 107 FS		
358th Fighter Squadron		Lobos	Air Combat Command	Fifteenth Air Force	495 FG	12 November 1942	Whiteman AFB, Missouri	TFI Active Associate to 303 FS		
367th Fighter Squadron		Vultures	Air Combat Command	Fifteenth Air Force	495 FG	1 January 1943	Homestead ARB, Florida	TFI Active Associate to 93 FS		
367th Fighter Squadron		Vultures	Air Combat Command	Fifteenth Air Force	495 FG	1 January 1943	Jacksonville ANGB, Florida	TFI Active Associate to 159 FS		
377th Fighter Squadron			Air Combat Command	Fifteenth Air Force	495 FG	1 March 1943	Montgomery ANGB, Alabama	TFI Active Associate to 100 FS		
377th Fighter Squadron			Air Combat Command	Fifteenth Air Force	495 FG	1 March 1943	NAS JRB New Orleans, Louisiana	TFI Active Associate to 122 FS		
378th Fighter Squadron		Gundogs	Air Combat Command	Fifteenth Air Force	495 FG	1 March 1943	Duluth ANGB, Minnesota	TFI Active Associate to 179 FS		
378th Fighter Squadron		Gundogs	Air Combat Command	Fifteenth Air Force	495 FG	1 March 1943	Joe Foss Field, South Dakota	TFI Active Associate to 175 FS		
378th Fighter Squadron		Gundogs	Air Combat Command	Fifteenth Air Force	495 FG	1 March 1943	Toledo ANGB, Ohio	TFI Active Associate to 112 FS		
378th Fighter Squadron		Gundogs	Air Combat Command	Fifteenth Air Force	495 FG	1 March 1943	Truax Field ANGB, Wisconsin	TFI Active Associate to 176 FS		
383rd Fighter Squadron		Mile High Hares	Air Combat Command	Fifteenth Air Force	495 FG	1 June 1943	Buckley Space Force Base, Colorado	TFI Active Associate to 120 FS		
389th Fighter Squadron		Thunderbolts	Air Combat Command	Fifteenth Air Force	366 FW	1 June 1943	Mountain Home AFB, Idaho	F-15E (PW-220)	MO	
391st Fighter Squadron		Bold Tigers	Air Combat Command	Fifteenth Air Force	366 FW	1 June 1943	Mountain Home AFB, Idaho	F-15E (PW-229)	MO	
421st Fighter Squadron		Black Widows	Air Combat Command	Fifteenth Air Force	388 FW	1 May 1943	Hill AFB, Utah	F-35A	HL	
425th Fighter Squadron		Black Widows	Air Combat Command	Fifteenth Air Force	56 FW	1 December 1943	Luke AFB, Arizona	F-16D (Block 52+)	LF	Awaiting relocation to Ebbing ANGB, Arkansas circa 2026
428th Fighter Squadron		Buccaneers	Air Combat Command	Fifteenth Air Force	366 FW	1 August 1943	Mountain Home AFB, Idaho	F-15SG	MO	
457th Fighter Squadron		Spads	Air Force Reserve Command	Tenth Air Force	301 FW	21 October 1944	NAS JRB Fort Worth, Texas	F-35A	TX	
466th Fighter Squadron		Diamondbacks	Air Force Reserve Command	Tenth Air Force	419 FW	12 October 1944	Hill AFB, Utah	TFI Reserve Associate to 4 FS, 34 FS, 421 FS		
480th Fighter Squadron		Warhawks	United States Air Forces in Europe – Air Forces Africa	Third Air Force	52 FW	15 July 1942	Spangdahlem AB, Germany	F-16C/D (Block 50)	SP	
492nd Fighter Squadron		Madhatters; Bolars	United States Air Forces in Europe – Air Forces Africa	Third Air Force	48 FW	15 January 1941	RAF Lakenheath, United Kingdom	F-15E (PW-229)	LN	Awaiting inactivation
493rd Fighter Squadron		Grim Reapers	United States Air Forces in Europe – Air Forces Africa	Third Air Force	48 FW	15 January 1941	RAF Lakenheath, United Kingdom	F-35A	LN	
494th Fighter Squadron		Panthers	United States Air Forces in Europe – Air Forces Africa	Third Air Force	48 FW	15 January 1941	RAF Lakenheath, United Kingdom	F-15E (PW-229)	LN	Awaiting F-35A
495th Fighter Squadron		Valkyries	United States Air Forces in Europe – Air Forces Africa	Third Air Force	48 FW	15 January 1941	RAF Lakenheath, United Kingdom	F-35A	LN	
510th Fighter Squadron		Buzzards	United States Air Forces in Europe – Air Forces Africa	Third Air Force	31 FW	1 March 1943	Aviano AB, Italy	F-16C/D (Block 40)	AV	
525th Fighter Squadron	;	Bulldogs	Pacific Air Forces	Eleventh Air Force	3 WG	10 February 1942	JB Elmendorf–Richardson, Alaska	F-22A	AK	
550th Fighter Squadron		Silver Eagles	Air Combat Command	Fifteenth Air Force	56 FW	1 June 1944	Kingsley Field ANGB, Oregon	TFI Active Associate to 114 FS		
555th Fighter Squadron		Triple Nickel	United States Air Forces in Europe – Air Forces Africa	Third Air Force	31 FW	1 December 1942	Aviano AB, Italy	F-16C/D (Block 40)	AV	

== Fighter Training Squadrons (FTS) ==
Squadron Name	Insignia	Nickname	Command	Air Force	Wing	Date First Activated	Base	Aircraft	Tail Code	Notes
7th Fighter Training Squadron		Screamin' Demons	Air Combat Command	Fifteenth Air Force	1 FW	15 January 1941	JB Langley–Eustis, Virginia	AT-38B; T-38A	FF	(Note: Conducts Adversary Air (ADAIR) support mission.)
88th Fighter Training Squadron		Lucky Devils	Air Education and Training Command	Nineteenth Air Force	80 FTW	9 February 1942	Sheppard AFB, Texas	T-38C	EN	(Note: Conducts Introduction to Fighter Fundamentals (IFF) training mission as part of the Euro-NATO Joint Jet Pilot Training (ENJJPT) program.)
435th Fighter Training Squadron		Deadly Black Eagles	Air Education and Training Command	Nineteenth Air Force	12 FTW	15 October 1943	JB San Antonio-Randolph, Texas	T-38C	RA	(Note: Conducts Introduction to Fighter Fundamentals (IFF) training mission for Undergraduate Combat Systems Officer (UCSO) training graduates and for International students (other than ENJJPT).) (Note: Performs T-38 and Fighter/Bomber Fundamentals Pilot Instructor Training (PIT) missions.)

== Flight Test Squadrons (FLTS) ==
Functional Check Flight (FCF) duties after Program Depot Maintenance (PDM) are performed by sister services or private contractors for C-17A, CV-22B, E-9A, E-4B, and E-11A airframes. Developmental Test (DT) duties are performed by sister services or private contractors for all E-9A, E-4B, and E-11A airframes.

Squadron Name	Insignia	Nickname	Command	Air Force	Wing	Date First Activated	Base	Aircraft	Tail Code	Notes
10th Flight Test Squadron		Sabres	Air Force Reserve Command	Twenty-Second Air Force	413 FLTG	15 January 1941	Tinker AFB, Oklahoma	B-1B; B-52H; E-3G; KC-46A; KC-135R/T		(Note: Performs Functional Check Flight (FCF) duties after Program Depot Maintenance (PDM) on listed aircraft - tails come from other USAF units and are flown by a permanent contingent of aircrew.)
40th Flight Test Squadron		Red Devils	Air Force Materiel Command	Air Force Test Center	96 TW	1 February 1940	Eglin AFB, Florida	F-15C/D; F-15E; F-15EX; F-16C/D	ET	(Note: Performs Developmental Test (DT) mission for the assigned aircraft.)
339th Flight Test Squadron		Rogues	Air Force Reserve Command	Twenty-Second Air Force	413 FLTG	3 October 1942	Robins AFB, Georgia	AC-130J; C-5M; C-130H; C-130J; F-15E; HC-130J; LC-130H; MC-130J; WC-130J		(Note: Also performs post-PDM FCF duties for USN and USMC C-130s.)
370th Flight Test Squadron		Flying Elvi	Air Force Reserve Command	Twenty-Second Air Force	413 FLTG	15 April 1942	Edwards AFB, California	NKC-135R	AFMC	(Note: 2x NKC-135R are shared between the 418 FLTS (Developmental Test support) and 370 FLTS (Experimental Test support).)
370th Flight Test Squadron		Flying Elvi	Air Force Reserve Command	Twenty-Second Air Force	413 FLTG	15 April 1942	Edwards AFB, California	TFI Reserve Associate to USAFTPS, 411 FLTS, 416 FLTS, 418 FLTS, 419 FLTS, 420 FLTS, 461 FLTS, and other unlisted AFTC units (Note: Not all test aircraft are necessarily permanently assigned to any given unit; most fighter aircraft are and hold the associated "ED" tailflash, but most heavy / ISR / bomber aircraft are temporarily "borrowed" from other USAF units. Only when on some flight test missions from this unit's assigned base will those heavy / ISR / bomber aircrews be from this unit.)		
411th Flight Test Squadron		Wizards	Air Force Materiel Command	Air Force Test Center	412 TW	10 March 1989	Edwards AFB, California	F-22A	ED	
413th Flight Test Squadron		Bombcats	Air Force Materiel Command	Air Force Test Center	96 TW	15 July 1942	Hurlburt Field, Florida	CV-22B	(Note: Squadron doesn't "own" any of this specific type of aircraft. As required, they will "borrow" from other USAF units and the Squadron will fly them with their own permanently-assigned aircrew.)	(Note: Squadron will periodically activate and deactivate Detachments as required to perform testing more local to another base or facility.)
413th Flight Test Squadron		Bombcats	Air Force Materiel Command	Air Force Test Center	96 TW	15 July 1942	Duke Field, Florida	UH-1N (Note: Also conducts Personnel Recovery (PR) missions under OPCON of the AFRCC, and missions supporting the Eglin AFB Land Range.)	ET (Note: Only the UH-1N is "owned" by the Squadron, holding the "ET" tailflash.)	(Note: Squadron will periodically activate and deactivate Detachments as required to perform testing more local to another base or facility.)
413th Flight Test Squadron		Bombcats	Air Force Materiel Command	Air Force Test Center	96 TW	15 July 1942	Det 1: Nellis AFB, Nevada	HH-60W (Note: Part of the Combat Search and Rescue Combined Test Force (CSAR CTF) 413th FLTS & 88th TES) (Note: utilizes 88th TES aircraft)		Awaiting relocation to Davis-Monthan AFB
416th Flight Test Squadron		Skulls	Air Force Materiel Command	Air Force Test Center	412 TW	1 June 1942	Edwards AFB, California	F-16C/D; T-38C	ED	(Note: Squadron performs ‘Shadow’ support for other test units with Target and Photo Chase requirements using F-16C/D and T-38C. Performs Developmental Test (DT) mission for F-16C/D and T-7A)
416th Flight Test Squadron		Skulls	Air Force Materiel Command	Air Force Test Center	412 TW	1 June 1942	Edwards AFB, California	T-7A	None	(Note: Squadron performs ‘Shadow’ support for other test units with Target and Photo Chase requirements using F-16C/D and T-38C. Performs Developmental Test (DT) mission for F-16C/D and T-7A)
416th Flight Test Squadron		Skulls	Air Force Materiel Command	Air Force Test Center	412 TW	1 June 1942	Unnamed Detachment: Morris ANGB, Arizona	TFI Active Associate to AATC		
417th Flight Test Squadron			Air Force Materiel Command	Air Force Test Center	96 TW	10 March 1989	Eglin AFB, Florida	C-130J		
417th Flight Test Squadron			Air Force Materiel Command	Air Force Test Center	96 TW	10 March 1989	Eglin AFB, Florida	AC-130J; HC-130J; MC-130J		
418th Flight Test Squadron		Tigers	Air Force Materiel Command	Air Force Test Center	412 TW	1 June 1942	Edwards AFB, California	C-12C/D	AFMC	(Note: 4x C-12C/D shared amongst the 418 FLTS, the USAF C-12 FTU (part of 418 FLTS), the USAFTPS and other 412 OG users.)
418th Flight Test Squadron		Tigers	Air Force Materiel Command	Air Force Test Center	412 TW	1 June 1942	Edwards AFB, California	NKC-135R	AFMC	
418th Flight Test Squadron		Tigers	Air Force Materiel Command	Air Force Test Center	412 TW	1 June 1942	Edwards AFB, California	C-17A	EDWARDS	(Note: Only a single C-17A (with an "EDWARDS" tailflash) is actually "owned" by this Squadron.) (Note: Performs Developmental Test (DT) mission for these aircraft as part of the Global Reach Combined Test Force (GR CTF).)
418th Flight Test Squadron		Tigers	Air Force Materiel Command	Air Force Test Center	412 TW	1 June 1942	Edwards AFB, California	C-5M; KC-46A; KC-135R/T		(Note: Only a single C-17A (with an "EDWARDS" tailflash) is actually "owned" by this Squadron.) (Note: Performs Developmental Test (DT) mission for these aircraft as part of the Global Reach Combined Test Force (GR CTF).)
419th Flight Test Squadron		Scorpions	Air Force Materiel Command	Air Force Test Center	412 TW	3 February 1942	Edwards AFB, California	B-1B; B-2A; B-52H	ED	(Note: Squadron performs B-2A post-depot maintenance Functional Check Flight (FCF) duties at USAF Plant 42, California.)
420th Flight Test Squadron			Air Force Materiel Command	Air Force Test Center	412 TW	1 June 1943	Edwards AFB, California	B-21A	ED	
452nd Flight Test Squadron		Marauders	Air Force Materiel Command	Air Force Test Center	412 TW	17 July 1942	Gray Butte Field, California	MQ-9A	None	
452nd Flight Test Squadron		Marauders	Air Force Materiel Command	Air Force Test Center	412 TW	17 July 1942	USAF Plant 42, California	RQ-170	None	
461st Flight Test Squadron		Deadly Jesters	Air Force Materiel Command	Air Force Test Center	412 TW	12 December 1942	Edwards AFB, California	F-35A	ED	
486th Flight Test Squadron			Air Force Materiel Command	Air Force Test Center	96 TW	1995	Eglin AFB, Florida	C-32B	None	
514th Flight Test Squadron		Flight Test Cowboys	Air Force Reserve Command	Twenty-Second Air Force	413 FLTG	31 October 1942	Hill AFB, Utah	F-16C/D; F-22A; F-35A		(Note: Also performs post-PDM FCF duties for USN F-35C, USMC F-35B, and many other countries' F-35 variants.)
586th Flight Test Squadron		Roadrunners	Air Force Materiel Command	Air Force Test Center	704 TG (Note: Group reports directly to Air Force Test Center)	5 March 1943	Holloman AFB, New Mexico	C-12J; T-38C	HT	(Note: Operate 4x modified & customizable T-38Cs and 1x C-12J. They perform ‘Shadow’ support for units with target and photo chase requirements as well as Developmental Test (DT) for new aircraft hardware.)

== Flying Training Squadrons (FTS) ==
Squadron Name	Insignia	Nickname	Command	Air Force	Wing	Date First Activated	Base	Aircraft	Tail Code	Notes
5th Flying Training Squadron		Spittin' Kittens	Air Force Reserve Command	Twenty-Second Air Force	340 FTG	15 January 1941	Vance AFB, Oklahoma	TFI Reserve Associate to 3 FTS, (Note: Formerly a T-1 squadron but now a simulator only squadron conducting Air Mobility Fundamentals-Simulator (AMF-S) course) 8 FTS, 25 FTS, 33 FTS		
8th Flying Training Squadron		8 Ballers	Air Education and Training Command	Nineteenth Air Force	71 FTW	1 February 1942	Vance AFB, Oklahoma	T-6A	VN	(Note: Conducts Undergraduate Pilot Training (UPT).)
23rd Flying Training Squadron			Air Education and Training Command	Nineteenth Air Force	58 SOW	15 January 1941	Fort Rucker, Alabama	TH-1H	FR	(Note: Conducts Undergraduate Helicopter Training (UHT).)
25th Flying Training Squadron		Shooters	Air Education and Training Command	Nineteenth Air Force	71 FTW	9 February 1943	Vance AFB, Oklahoma	T-38C	VN	(Note: Conducts Fighter/Bomber Fundamentals (F/BF) training mission.)
33rd Flying Training Squadron		Dragons	Air Education and Training Command	Nineteenth Air Force	71 FTW	1 February 1940	Vance AFB, Oklahoma	T-6A	VN	
37th Flying Training Squadron		Bengal Tigers	Air Education and Training Command	Nineteenth Air Force	14 FTW	15 January 1941	Columbus AFB, Mississippi	T-6A	CB	
39th Flying Training Squadron		Cobras	Air Force Reserve Command	Twenty-Second Air Force	340 FTG	1 February 1940	JB San Antonio-Randolph, Texas	TFI Reserve Associate to 99 FTS, 435 FTS, (Note: Fighter Training Squadron) 559 FTS		
41st Flying Training Squadron		Flying Buzzsaws	Air Education and Training Command	Nineteenth Air Force	14 FTW	1 February 1940	Columbus AFB, Mississippi	T-6A	CB	
43rd Flying Training Squadron		Red Birds	Air Force Reserve Command	Twenty-Second Air Force	340 FTG	1 February 1940	Columbus AFB, Mississippi	TFI Reserve Associate to 37 FTS, 41 FTS, 48 FTS, 49 FTS		
49th Flying Training Squadron		Black Knights; Hangmen	Air Education and Training Command	Nineteenth Air Force	14 FTW	15 January 1941	Columbus AFB, Mississippi	T-38C	CB	
70th Flying Training Squadron			Air Force Reserve Command	Twenty-Second Air Force	340 FTG	15 January 1941	U.S. Air Force Academy, Colorado	TFI Reserve Associate to 94 FTS, 98 FTS, 557 FTS		
85th Flying Training Squadron		Tigers	Air Education and Training Command	Nineteenth Air Force	47 FTW	15 January 1941	Laughlin AFB, Texas	T-6A	XL	
87th Flying Training Squadron		Raging Red Bulls	Air Education and Training Command	Nineteenth Air Force	47 FTW	18 August 1917	Laughlin AFB, Texas	T-38C	XL	
89th Flying Training Squadron		Banshees	Air Education and Training Command	Nineteenth Air Force	80 FTW	9 February 1942	Sheppard AFB, Texas	T-6A	EN	(Note: Conducts Euro-NATO Joint Jet Pilot Training Program (ENJJPT) Ph II training mission.)
90th Flying Training Squadron		Boxin' Bears	Air Education and Training Command	Nineteenth Air Force	80 FTW	9 February 1942	Sheppard AFB, Texas	T-38C	EN	(Note: Conducts Euro-NATO Joint Jet Pilot Training Program (ENJJPT) Ph III training mission.)
94th Flying Training Squadron		Silver Eagles	Direct Reporting Unit	United States Air Force Academy	306 FTG (Note: Group reports directly to USAFA)	1 June 1943	U.S. Air Force Academy, Colorado	TG-15A/B; TG-16A; TG-17A		
96th Flying Training Squadron		Boxing Bunnies	Air Force Reserve Command	Twenty-Second Air Force	340 FTG	9 February 1942	Laughlin AFB, Texas	TFI Reserve Associate to 85 FTS, 86 FTS, 87 FTS, 434 FTS		
97th Flying Training Squadron		Devilcats	Air Force Reserve Command	Twenty-Second Air Force	340 FTG	9 February 1942	Sheppard AFB, Texas	TFI Reserve Associate to 88 FTS, 89 FTS, 90 FTS, 459 FTS, 469 FTS		
98th Flying Training Squadron		Wings of Blue	Direct Reporting Unit	United States Air Force Academy	306 FTG	16 December 1941	U.S. Air Force Academy, Colorado	UV-18B		
99th Flying Training Squadron		Redtails	Air Education and Training Command	Nineteenth Air Force	12 FTW	22 March 1941	JB San Antonio-Randolph, Texas	T-7A	None	(Note: Performs Pilot Instructor Training (PIT) mission.)
434th Flying Training Squadron		Red Devils	Air Education and Training Command	Nineteenth Air Force	47 FTW	15 October 1943	Laughlin AFB, Texas	T-6A	XL	
455th Flying Training Squadron		Night Hawks	Air Education and Training Command	Nineteenth Air Force	12 FTW (479th FTG)	4 August 1942	NAS Pensacola, Florida	T-6A	AP	(Note: Conducts Undergraduate Combat Systems Officer (UCSO) Primary training.)
459th Flying Training Squadron		Twin Dragons	Air Education and Training Command	Nineteenth Air Force	80 FTW	1 September 1943	Sheppard AFB, Texas	T-6A	EN	
469th Flying Training Squadron		Fighting Bulls	Air Education and Training Command	Nineteenth Air Force	80 FTW	15 July 1942	Sheppard AFB, Texas	T-38C	EN	
557th Flying Training Squadron		Sharkbait	Direct Reporting Unit	United States Air Force Academy	306 FTG	1 December 1942	U.S. Air Force Academy, Colorado	T-41D; T-51A; T-53A		
559th Flying Training Squadron		Fighting Billygoats	Air Education and Training Command	Nineteenth Air Force	12 FTW	15 January 1941	JB San Antonio-Randolph, Texas	T-6A	RA	

== Helicopter Squadrons (HS) ==
Squadron Name	Insignia	Nickname	Command	Air Force	Wing	Date First Activated	Base	Aircraft	Tail Code	Notes
1st Helicopter Squadron			Direct Reporting Unit	Air Force District of Washington	316 WG	20 April 1944	JB Andrews, Maryland	UH-1N	UNITED STATES OF AMERICA	Awaiting HH-60W circa 2031
5th Helicopter Squadron		Fivers	Direct Reporting Unit	Air Force District of Washington	316 WG	27 August 2026	JB Andrews, Maryland	HH-60W	USAF	
24th Helicopter Squadron			Air Education and Training Command	Nineteenth Air Force	58 SOW	1 December 1939	Maxwell AFB, Alabama	TFI Active Associate to 703 HS (Note: All sortie generation and the majority of instruction is provided by the AFRC 703rd Helicopter Squadron, although students are assigned to the Active Duty 24th Helicopter Squadron.)		
37th Helicopter Squadron			Air Force Global Strike Command	Twentieth Air Force	582 HG	14 November 1952	FE Warren AFB, Wyoming	UH-1N; MH-139A	FE	Transition to MH-139A underway
40th Helicopter Squadron		Pathfinders	Air Force Global Strike Command	Twentieth Air Force	582 HG	21 March 1968	Malmstrom AFB, Montana	MH-139A	MM	
54th Helicopter Squadron			Air Force Global Strike Command	Twentieth Air Force	582 HG	14 November 1952	Minot AFB, North Dakota	UH-1N	MT	
550th Helicopter Squadron			Air Force Global Strike Command	Twentieth Air Force	582 HG		Malmstrom AFB, Montana	MH-139A (Note: Once IOT&E was completed at Malmstrom AFB in 2025 the squadron's aircraft were transferred to the 40th HS. The squadron no longer has aircraft of its own and its crews use the aircraft of the currently transitioning 37th HS, and will use those of the 54th HS after completion of the 37th's transition to transition those squadrons from the UH-1N to the MH-139A.)		(Note: Conducted IOT&E (completed 2025) and conducts UH-1N to MH-139A transition training for the 40th HS (completed), 37th HS (ongoing) and 54th HS (future).)
703rd Helicopter Squadron			Air Force Reserve Command	Twenty-Second Air Force	908 FTW	1 April 1943	Maxwell AFB, Alabama	MH-139A	None	

== Reconnaissance Squadrons (RS) ==
Squadron Name	Insignia	Nickname	Command	Air Force	Wing	Date First Activated	Base	Aircraft	Tail Code	Notes
1st Reconnaissance Squadron			Air Combat Command	Sixteenth Air Force	9 RW	5 March 1913	Beale AFB, California	T/U-2S; T-38A	BB	
4th Reconnaissance Squadron		Crows	Air Combat Command	Sixteenth Air Force (Note: Operational Control (OPCON) retained by Pacific Air Forces (PACAF) or Air Forces Korea (AFKOR).)	319 RW	1 April 1941	Yokota AB, Japan	RQ-4B		(Note: Geographically Separated Unit of the 319th RW conducting Launch & Recovery and Maintenance of forward based RQ-4 aircraft flown by 348th RS crews.)
5th Reconnaissance Squadron		Black Cats	Air Combat Command	Sixteenth Air Force	9 RW	5 May 1917	Osan AB, South Korea	U-2S	BB	(Note: Geographically Separated Unit of the 9th RW with permanently assigned aircraft, aircrew and maintenance personnel.)
7th Reconnaissance Squadron		Titans	Air Combat Command	Sixteenth Air Force (Note: Operational Control (OPCON) retained by USAFE or AFAFRICA.)	319 RW	29 March 1917	NAS Sigonella, Italy	RQ-4B		
7th Reconnaissance Squadron		Titans	Air Combat Command	Sixteenth Air Force	319 RW	29 March 1917	Unnamed Detachment: RAF Fairford, United Kingdom	RQ-4B		
30th Reconnaissance Squadron		Blackbirds	Air Combat Command	Fifteenth Air Force	432 WG	1 May 1943	Creech AFB, Nevada	RQ-170	None	
38th Reconnaissance Squadron		Hellcats	Air Combat Command	Sixteenth Air Force	55 WG	15 January 1941	Offutt AFB, Nebraska	RC-135V/W	OF	
44th Reconnaissance Squadron		Magnums	Air Combat Command	Fifteenth Air Force	432 WG	30 June 1917	Creech AFB, Nevada	RQ-170	None	
45th Reconnaissance Squadron		Wildcats	Air Combat Command	Sixteenth Air Force	55 WG	1 October 1943	Offutt AFB, Nebraska	RC-135S; RC-135U	OF	
45th Reconnaissance Squadron		Wildcats	Air Combat Command	Sixteenth Air Force		1 October 1943	Offutt AFB, Nebraska	WC-135R	OF	
74th Reconnaissance Squadron		White Bats	Air Combat Command	Sixteenth Air Force	9 RW	22 February 1918	Beale AFB, California (Note: Due to lack of available hangar space, it is likely that many of the airframes themselves are also located at the Homey Airport and/or Edwards AFB (South Base).)	RQ-180 (alleged)	Unknown	
82nd Reconnaissance Squadron		Hog Heaven; Eight Deuce	Air Combat Command	Sixteenth Air Force	55 WG	1 June 1937	Kadena AB, Japan	RC-135S; RC-135U; RC-135V/W; WC-135R		(Note: Geographically Separated Unit of the 55th WG with no permanently assigned aircraft or operational flight crews. Flight operations are conducted by deployed aircrews and aircraft of the 38th RS, 45th RS, and 343rd RS))
82nd Reconnaissance Squadron		Hog Heaven; Eight Deuce	Air Combat Command	Sixteenth Air Force	55 WG	1 June 1937	Det 1: JB Elmendorf–Richardson, Alaska	RC-135S; RC-135U; RC-135V/W; WC-135R		(Note: Geographically Separated Unit of the 55th WG with no permanently assigned aircraft or operational flight crews. Flight operations are conducted by deployed aircrews and aircraft of the 38th RS, 45th RS, and 343rd RS))
95th Reconnaissance Squadron		Kicking Mules	Air Combat Command	Sixteenth Air Force	55 WG	20 August 1917	RAF Mildenhall, United Kingdom	RC-135S; RC-135U; RC-135V/W; WC-135R		
95th Reconnaissance Squadron		Kicking Mules	Air Combat Command	Sixteenth Air Force	55 WG	20 August 1917	Det 1: NSA Souda Bay, Greece	RC-135S; RC-135U; RC-135V/W; WC-135R		
99th Reconnaissance Squadron			Air Combat Command	Sixteenth Air Force	9 RW	21 August 1917	Beale AFB, California	U-2S	BB	(Note: Deploys aircraft and personnel to RAF Fairfield UK as 99th ERS.)
238th Reconnaissance Squadron			Air National Guard, Nebraska		170 GP (Note: Group reports directly to Nebraska ANG HQ)	July 2007	Offutt AFB, Nebraska	TFI Reserve Associate to 38 RS, 45 RS, 343 RS, 338 CTS		
343rd Reconnaissance Squadron		Ravens	Air Combat Command	Sixteenth Air Force	55 WG	1 February 1943	Offutt AFB, Nebraska	RC-135V/W	OF	
348th Reconnaissance Squadron		Northern Hawks	Air Combat Command	Sixteenth Air Force	319 RW	1 June 1942	Grand Forks AFB, North Dakota	RQ-4B	GF	
427th Reconnaissance Squadron		Spartans	Air Combat Command	Sixteenth Air Force	9 RW	12 June 1917	Beale AFB, California	RQ-180 (alleged)	Unknown	

== Rescue Squadrons (RQS) ==
Squadron Name	Insignia	Nickname	Command	Air Force	Wing	Date First Activated	Base	Aircraft	Tail Code	Notes
33rd Rescue Squadron			Pacific Air Forces	Fifth Air Force	18 WG	14 November 1952	Kadena AB, Japan	HH-60W	ZZ	
36th Rescue Squadron			Air Education and Training Command	Nineteenth Air Force	58 SOW	14 November 1952	Fairchild AFB, Washington	UH-1N	36 RQS	(Note: Provides support for the USAF SERE school and conducts civil Search and Rescue in support of civilian authorities.)
39th Rescue Squadron			Air Force Reserve Command	Tenth Air Force	920 RQW	14 November 1952	Patrick SFB, Florida	HC-130J	FL	
41st Rescue Squadron			Air Combat Command	Fifteenth Air Force	23 WG (347 RQG)	14 November 1952	Moody AFB, Georgia	HH-60W	MY	
55th Rescue Squadron		Night Hawks	Air Combat Command	Fifteenth Air Force	355 WG (563 RQG)	14 November 1952	Davis–Monthan AFB, Arizona	HH-60W	DM	
56th Rescue Squadron			United States Air Forces in Europe – Air Forces Africa	Third Air Force	31 FW	14 November 1952	Aviano AB, Italy	HH-60W	AV	
71st Rescue Squadron			Air Combat Command	Fifteenth Air Force	23 WG (347 RQG)	14 November 1952	Moody AFB, Georgia	HC-130J	MY	
79th Rescue Squadron			Air Combat Command	Fifteenth Air Force	355 WG (563 RQG)	14 November 1952	Davis–Monthan AFB, Arizona	HC-130J	DM	
101st Rescue Squadron			Air National Guard, New York		106 RQW	2004	Francis S. Gabreski ANGB, New York	HH-60W	None	
102nd Rescue Squadron			Air National Guard, New York		106 RQW	15 November 1915	Francis S. Gabreski ANGB, New York	HC-130J	LI	
129th Rescue Squadron			Air National Guard, California		129 RQW	1 February 1940	Moffett Federal Airfield, California	HH-60W	CA	
130th Rescue Squadron			Air National Guard, California		129 RQW	1 October 2003	Moffett Federal Airfield, California	HC-130J	CA	
188th Rescue Squadron		Tacos	Air National Guard, New Mexico		150 SOW	25 January 1943	Kirtland AFB, New Mexico	HC-130J	NM	
210th Rescue Squadron			Air National Guard, Alaska		176 WG	1 July 1942	JB Elmendorf–Richardson, Alaska	HH-60W	AK	
210th Rescue Squadron			Air National Guard, Alaska		176 WG	1 July 1942	Det 1: Eielson AFB, Alaska	HH-60W	AK	(Note: Unit is on 24/7 Personnel Recovery (PR) Alert at this facility under OPCON of the nearest Rescue Coordination Center (RCC).)
211th Rescue Squadron			Air National Guard, Alaska		176 WG	2 October 2004	JB Elmendorf–Richardson, Alaska	HC-130J	AK	
301st Rescue Squadron			Air Force Reserve Command	Tenth Air Force	920 RQW	18 August 1956	Patrick SFB, Florida	HH-60W	FL	
305th Rescue Squadron			Air Force Reserve Command	Tenth Air Force	920 RQW (943 RQG)	8 February 1958	Davis–Monthan AFB, Arizona	HH-60W	DR	
512th Rescue Squadron			Air Education and Training Command	Nineteenth Air Force	58 SOW	31 October 1942	Kirtland AFB, New Mexico	HH-60W	None	

== Special Operations Squadrons (SOS) ==
Squadron Name	Insignia	Nickname	Command	Air Force	Wing	Date First Activated	Base	Aircraft	Notes / Tail Code
1st Special Operations Squadron			Air Force Special Operations Command		353 SOW	1 August 1939	Kadena AB, Japan	MC-130J	AFSOC does not use tail markings
2nd Special Operations Squadron			Air Force Reserve Command	Tenth Air Force	919 SOW	25 September 1917	Hurlburt Field, Florida	TFI Reserve Associate to 65 SOS	
3rd Special Operations Squadron			Air Force Special Operations Command		27 SOW	4 April 1918	Cannon AFB, New Mexico	MQ-9A	
4th Special Operations Squadron		Ghostriders	Air Force Special Operations Command		1 SOW	8 April 1942	Hurlburt Field, Florida	AC-130J	
5th Special Operations Squadron			Air Force Reserve Command	Tenth Air Force	919 SOW	1 May 1944	Hurlburt Field, Florida	TFI Reserve Associate to 19 SOS (Note: Not associated with 19 SOS's C-146A mission.)	
6th Special Operations Squadron		Commandos	Air Force Special Operations Command		492 SOW	6 October 2022	Cannon AFB, New Mexico	MC-130J	Awaiting reassignment to 27 SOW
7th Special Operations Squadron			Air Force Special Operations Command		352 SOW	17 July 1942	RAF Mildenhall, United Kingdom	CV-22B	
8th Special Operations Squadron		Blackbirds	Air Force Special Operations Command		1 SOW	21 June 1917	Hurlburt Field, Florida	CV-22B	
9th Special Operations Squadron		Night Wings	Air Force Special Operations Command		27 SOW	1 April 1944	Cannon AFB, New Mexico	MC-130J	
12th Special Operations Squadron		Dirty Dozen	Air Force Special Operations Command		27 SOW	15 January 1941	Cannon AFB, New Mexico	MQ-9A	
15th Special Operations Squadron			Air Force Special Operations Command		1 SOW	13 October 1942	Hurlburt Field, Florida	MC-130J	
16th Special Operations Squadron			Air Force Special Operations Command		27 SOW	16 April 1942	Cannon AFB, New Mexico	AC-130J	
17th Special Operations Squadron		Jackals	Air Force Special Operations Command		492 SOW	2 March 1942	Will Rogers ANGB, Oklahoma	OA-1K	
19th Special Operations Squadron			Air Force Special Operations Command		492 SOW	1 February 1940	Hurlburt Field, Florida	U-28A	Divest U-28A by 2029
19th Special Operations Squadron			Air Force Special Operations Command		492 SOW	1 February 1940	Duke Field, Florida	C-146A	
20th Special Operations Squadron		Green Hornets	Air Force Special Operations Command		27 SOW	2 March 1942	Cannon AFB, New Mexico	CV-22B	Awaiting realignment to 492nd SOW & relocation to Davis-Monthan AFB, Arizona by 2028
21st Special Operations Squadron		Dust Devils	Air Force Special Operations Command		353 SOW	1 February 1940	Yokota AB, Japan	CV-22B	
33rd Special Operations Squadron			Air Force Special Operations Command		27 SOW	12 June 1917	Cannon AFB, New Mexico	MQ-9A	
34th Special Operations Squadron		Dragons	Air Force Special Operations Command		1 SOW	14 February 1942	Hurlburt Field, Florida	U-28A	Awaiting OA-1K, realignment to 492nd SOW & relocation to Davis-Monthan AFB, Arizona by 2028
65th Special Operations Squadron		Dicers	Air Force Special Operations Command		1 SOW	15 January 1941	Hurlburt Field, Florida	MQ-9A	
67th Special Operations Squadron		Night Owls	Air Force Special Operations Command		352 SOW	14 November 1952	RAF Mildenhall, United Kingdom	MC-130J	
71st Special Operations Squadron			Air Education and Training Command	Nineteenth Air Force	58 SOW	9 February 1943	Kirtland AFB, New Mexico	CV-22B	
73rd Special Operations Squadron			Air Education and Training Command	Nineteenth Air Force	58 SOW	26 February 1918	Kirtland AFB, New Mexico	AC-130J	
150th Special Operations Squadron		Guardians of the Gate	Air National Guard, New Jersey		108 WG	1 February 1956	JB McGuire–Dix–Lakehurst, Pennsylvania	C-32B	
185th Special Operations Squadron		Nomads	Air National Guard, Oklahoma		137 SOW	4 February 1943	Will Rogers ANGB, Oklahoma	TFI Reserve Associate to 17 SOS	
193rd Special Operations Squadron			Air National Guard, Pennsylvania		193 SOW	1 October 1942	Harrisburg ANGB, Pennsylvania	MC-130J	
249th Special Operations Squadron			Air National Guard, Florida		125 FW		Hurlburt Field, Florida	TFI Reserve Associate to 8 SOS	
310th Special Operations Squadron			Air Force Special Operations Command		27 SOW	1 October 1943	Cannon AFB, New Mexico	U-28A	Awaiting airframe replacement or inactivation by 2029
318th Special Operations Squadron		Dark Horses	Air Force Special Operations Command		27 SOW	1 May 1944	Cannon AFB, New Mexico	U-28A	Awaiting airframe replacement or inactivation by 2029
319th Special Operations Squadron		Slayers	Air Force Special Operations Command		492 SOW	1 September 1944	Hurlburt Field, Florida	U-28A	Awaiting OA-1K and relocation to Davis-Monthan AFB, Arizona by 2028
415th Special Operations Squadron		Nightstalkers	Air Education and Training Command	Nineteenth Air Force	58 SOW	10 February 1943	Kirtland AFB, New Mexico	MC-130J	
415th Special Operations Squadron		Nightstalkers	Air Education and Training Command	Nineteenth Air Force	58 SOW	10 February 1943	Kirtland AFB, New Mexico	Also TFI Active Associate to 188th RQS (HC-130J)	
427th Special Operations Squadron			Air Force Special Operations Command			1944	Pope Field, North Carolina	Various non-standard aircraft	
524th Special Operations Squadron		Hounds of Heaven	Air Force Special Operations Command		492 SOW	15 January 1941	Duke Field, Florida	C-146A	
711th Special Operations Squadron			Air Force Reserve Command	Tenth Air Force	919 SOW	1 May 1943	Hurlburt Field, Florida	TFI Reserve Associate to 4 SOS	
859th Special Operations Squadron			Air Force Reserve Command	Tenth Air Force	919 SOW	18 October 1942	Duke Field, Florida	TFI Reserve Associate to 524 SOS	

== Test and Evaluation Squadrons (TES) ==
Operational Test and Evaluation (OT&E) duties are performed by sister services or private contractors for CV-22B, all W/RC-135 variants, E-9A, E-4B, EA-37B, and E-11A airframes.

Squadron Name	Insignia	Nickname	Command	Air Force	Wing	Date First Activated	Base	Aircraft	Tail Code	Notes
15th Test and Evaluation Squadron		Joyboy	Air Combat Command	United States Air Force Warfare Center	53 WG (753 TEG)		Creech AFB, Nevada	RQ-170	Unknown	
18th Special Operations Test and Evaluation Squadron		Stingers	Air Force Special Operations Command			15 January 1941	Hurlburt Field, Florida	AC-130J; C-146A; MC-130J; U-28A; OA-1K		
31st Test and Evaluation Squadron			Air Combat Command	United States Air Force Warfare Center	53 WG (753 TEG)	26 June 1917	Edwards AFB, California	B-21A	ED	
49th Test and Evaluation Squadron		Wolfpack	Air Combat Command	United States Air Force Warfare Center	53 WG (753 TEG)	6 August 1917	Barksdale AFB, Louisiana	B-52H	OT	
49th Test and Evaluation Squadron		Wolfpack	Air Combat Command	United States Air Force Warfare Center	53 WG (753 TEG)	6 August 1917	Barksdale AFB, Louisiana	Utilizes aircraft generated by 93 BS		
72nd Test and Evaluation Squadron		Coyotes	Air Combat Command	United States Air Force Warfare Center	53 WG (753 TEG)	18 February 1918	Whiteman AFB, Missouri	B-2A		
84th Test and Evaluation Squadron		Fightin’ Wizards	Air Force Reserve Command	Tenth Air Force	926 WG	15 October 1983	Eglin AFB, Florida	TFI Reserve Associate to 85 TES		
85th Test and Evaluation Squadron		Skulls	Air Combat Command	United States Air Force Warfare Center	53 WG	9 February 1942	Eglin AFB, Florida	F-15C/D; F-15E; F-15EX; F-16C/D	OT	
88th Test and Evaluation Squadron			Air Combat Command	United States Air Force Warfare Center	53 WG	1 October 2002	Nellis AFB, Nevada	HH-60W	OT	Awaiting relocation to Davis-Monthan AFB by 2028
337th Test and Evaluation Squadron		Slayers	Air Combat Command	United States Air Force Warfare Center	53 WG (753 TEG)	15 July 1942	Dyess AFB, Texas	B-1B	OT	
410th Test and Evaluation Squadron			Air Combat Command	United States Air Force Warfare Center	53 WG (753 TEG)	10 Mar 1989	Beale AFB, California	U-2S		
410th Test and Evaluation Squadron			Air Combat Command	United States Air Force Warfare Center	53 WG (753 TEG)	21 July 2025	Det 1: Grand Forks AFB, North Dakota	RQ-4B		
417th Test and Evaluation Squadron		Phantoms	Air Combat Command	United States Air Force Warfare Center	53 WG (753 TEG)	20 February 1943	Edwards AFB (South Base), California	RQ-180 (alleged)	Unknown	
418th Test and Evaluation Squadron			Air Combat Command	United States Air Force Warfare Center	53 WG	17 Mar 1943	Davis Monthan AFB, Arizona	HC-130J	OT	
422nd Test and Evaluation Squadron		Green Bats	Air Combat Command	United States Air Force Warfare Center	53 WG	1 August 1943	Nellis AFB, Nevada	F-15E; F-15EX; F-16C/D; F-22A; F-35A	OT	
460th Test and Evaluation Squadron		Tigers	Air Force Reserve Command	Tenth Air Force	926 WG		Nellis AFB, Nevada	TFI Reserve Associate to 422 TES		
556th Test and Evaluation Squadron		Crows	Air Combat Command	United States Air Force Warfare Center	53 WG	20 June 1942	Creech AFB, Nevada	MQ-9A	OT	
605th Test & Evaluation Squadron Det 1			Air Combat Command	United States Air Force Warfare Center	505 CCW (505 TTG)		Tinker AFB, Oklahoma	E-3G		
Air Mobility Command Test and Evaluation Squadron			Air Mobility Command			2 Feb 1942	JB McGuire–Dix–Lakehurst, New Jersey	C-130J; C-5M; C-17A; KC-46A; KC-135R/T		
Air Mobility Command Test and Evaluation Squadron			Air Mobility Command			2 Feb 1942	Det 3: Edwards AFB, California	C-130J; C-5M; C-17A; KC-46A; KC-135R/T		
Experimental Operations Unit			Air Combat Command	United States Air Force Warfare Center	53 WG	5 June 2025	Nellis AFB, Nevada	YFQ-42A; YFQ-44A; YFQ-48A		

== Weapons Squadrons (WPS) ==
Source: (Note: Mission crew aboard E-3G, EA-37B, and all RC-135 variants attend a non-flying Weapons Instructor Course (WIC) at the 8th Weapons Squadron.)

Squadron Name	Insignia	Nickname	Command	Air Force	Wing	Date First Activated	Base	Aircraft	Tail Code	Notes
6th Weapons Squadron		Bull Six; Skulls	Air Combat Command	United States Air Force Warfare Center	57 WG	13 March 1917	Nellis AFB, Nevada	F-35A	WA	
14th Weapons Squadron		Air Commandos	Air Combat Command	United States Air Force Warfare Center	57 WG	2 March 1942	Hurlburt Field, Florida	AC-130J; CV-22B; MC-130J; U-28A		
16th Weapons Squadron		Tomahawks	Air Combat Command	United States Air Force Warfare Center	57 WG	15 January 1941	Nellis AFB, Nevada	F-16C/D (Block 52)	WA	
17th Weapons Squadron		Hooters	Air Combat Command	United States Air Force Warfare Center	57 WG	16 June 1917	Nellis AFB, Nevada	F-15E	WA	
26th Weapons Squadron		Bai-Hu Tigers	Air Combat Command	United States Air Force Warfare Center	57 WG	15 January 1941	Nellis AFB, Nevada	MQ-9A	WA	
29th Weapons Squadron			Air Combat Command	United States Air Force Warfare Center	57 WG	2 March 1942	Little Rock AFB, Arkansas	C-130J		
29th Weapons Squadron			Air Combat Command	United States Air Force Warfare Center	57 WG	2 March 1942	Det 1: Rosecrans ANGB, Missouri	C-130H		
34th Weapons Squadron			Air Combat Command	United States Air Force Warfare Center	57 WG	14 November 1952	Nellis AFB, Nevada	HH-60W; HC-130J	WA	Awaiting relocation to Davis-Monthan AFB by 2028
57th Weapons Squadron			Air Combat Command	United States Air Force Warfare Center	57 WG	18 November 1942	JB Lewis–McChord, Washington	C-17A		
77th Weapons Squadron			Air Combat Command	United States Air Force Warfare Center	57 WG	15 January 1941	Dyess AFB, Texas	B-1B	WA	
325th Weapons Squadron		Cavemen	Air Combat Command	United States Air Force Warfare Center	57 WG	1 March 1942	Whiteman AFB, Missouri	B-2A		
340th Weapons Squadron		Titans	Air Combat Command	United States Air Force Warfare Center	57 WG	3 February 1942	Barksdale AFB, Louisiana	B-52H	BD	Utilizes aircraft generated by 93 BS
433rd Weapons Squadron		Satan's Angels	Air Combat Command	United States Air Force Warfare Center	57 WG	15 May 1943	Nellis AFB, Nevada	F-22A	WA	
509th Weapons Squadron			Air Combat Command	United States Air Force Warfare Center	57 WG	1 March 1943	Fairchild AFB, Washington	KC-135R/T; KC-46A		

== Other Units ==
Squadron Name	Insignia	Nickname	Command	Air Force	Wing	Date First Activated	Base	Aircraft	Tail Code	Notes
1st Airborne Command Control Squadron (ACCS)			Air Force Global Strike Command	Eighth Air Force	95 WG (NAOC)	25 September 1917	Offutt AFB, Nebraska	E-4B	B	
1st Aviation Standards Flight (ASF)		Combat Flight Check	Air Force Reserve Command	Fourth Air Force	507 ARW	1 June 1999	Mike Monroney Aeronautical Center, Oklahoma	TFI Reserve Associate to 375 OG Det 1 (Note: Conducts Combat Flight Inspection (CFIN) mission and augments FAA Flight Inspection mission. 2x modified CL-605s (registrations N89 and N90) are C-143Bs certified for Combat Flight Inspection (CFIN). Aircrew will often fly the other 3x FAA CL-600-2B16s (registrations N85, N86, N87) not certified to fly in combat with FAA crewmembers. All 5 are maintained by the FAA supported by some USAF funding.)		
47th Fighter Squadron		Dogpatchers; Terrible Termites	Air Force Reserve Command	Tenth Air Force		1 December 1940	Awaiting F-35A TFI Reserve Associate assignment			
53rd Weather Reconnaissance Squadron (WRS)		Hurricane Hunters	Air Force Reserve Command	Twenty-Second Air Force	403 WG	31 August 1944	Keesler AFB, Mississippi	WC-130J	WEATHER	
82nd Aerial Targets Squadron (ATRS)		Team Target; Zombie Vipers	Air Combat Command	United States Air Force Warfare Center	53 WG (53 WEG)	9 February 1942	Tyndall AFB, Florida	E-9A; QF-16A/C	TD	
82nd Aerial Targets Squadron (ATRS)		Team Target; Zombie Vipers	Air Combat Command	United States Air Force Warfare Center	53 WG (53 WEG)	9 February 1942	Det 1: Holloman AFB, New Mexico	QF-16A/C	HD	
154th Training Squadron (TS)			Air National Guard, Arkansas		189 AW	8 December 1917	Little Rock AFB, Arkansas	C-130H; C-130J	ARKANSAS	Transition to C-130J underway
415th Flight Test Flight (FLTF)			Air Force Reserve Command	Twenty-Second Air Force	413 FLTG	3 February 1942	JB San Antonio-Randolph, Texas	AT-38B; T-38A; T-38C; T-6A		
645th Aeronautical Systems Squadron (AESS)			Air Force Material Command	Air Force Life Cycle Management Center	645 AESG (BIG SAFARI)		Majors Airport, Texas	NC-135W	MF	(Note: A single aircraft (tail number 62-4133) operates as a test-bed aircraft for systems and equipment used on the RC-135V/W. These missions are led by the military contractor L3Harris with some USAF aircrew assigned in support.)
645th Aeronautical Systems Squadron (AESS)			Air Force Material Command	Air Force Life Cycle Management Center	645 AESG (BIG SAFARI)		Majors Airport, Texas	RC-135S; RC-135U; RC-135V/W; TC-135W; WC-135R		(Note: Performs post-Program Depot Maintenance (PDM) Functional Check Flight (FCF) duties, Developmental Test (DT), and Operational Test & Evaluation (OT&E) for EA-37B and all T/W/RC-135 variants. These missions are led by the military contractor L3Harris with some USAF aircrew assigned in support. L3Harris and the Squadron is mainly tasked with rapidly applying modifications to mission hardware and software overseen by AFLCMC/WI.)
645th Aeronautical Systems Squadron (AESS)			Air Force Material Command	Air Force Life Cycle Management Center	645 AESG (BIG SAFARI)		Det 1: TSTC Waco Airport, Texas	EA-37B		(Note: Performs post-Program Depot Maintenance (PDM) Functional Check Flight (FCF) duties, Developmental Test (DT), and Operational Test & Evaluation (OT&E) for EA-37B and all T/W/RC-135 variants. These missions are led by the military contractor L3Harris with some USAF aircrew assigned in support. L3Harris and the Squadron is mainly tasked with rapidly applying modifications to mission hardware and software overseen by AFLCMC/WI.)
730th Air Mobility Training Squadron (AMTS)		Rebels	Air Force Reserve Command	Fourth Air Force	507 ARW	12 June 2012	Altus AFB, Oklahoma	TFI Reserve Associate to 54 ARS, 56 ARS, 58 AS		
USAF Air Demonstration Squadron		Thunderbirds	Air Combat Command	United States Air Force Warfare Center	57 WG	25 May 1953	Nellis AFB, Nevada	F-16C/D (Block 52)	None	
Future Fighter Squadrons			Air Combat Command	Fifteenth Air Force	33 FW (85 FG)		Ebbing ANGB, Arkansas	F-35A	Awaiting activation	
Future Fighter Squadron			Air Combat Command	Fifteenth Air Force	33 FW (85 FG)		Ebbing ANGB, Arkansas	F-35A	Awaiting activation circa 2026	
Future Fighter Squadron			Air Combat Command	Fifteenth Air Force	33 FW (85 FG)		Ebbing ANGB, Arkansas	F-35B	Awaiting activation circa 2026	
1st Fighter Squadron		Fightin' Furies	Air Combat Command	Fifteenth Air Force	325 FW		Tyndall AFB, Florida	F-35A	Awaiting activation circa 2027	
2nd Fighter Squadron		American Beagle Squadron	Air Combat Command	Fifteenth Air Force	325 FW		Tyndall AFB, Florida	F-35A	Awaiting activation circa 2029	

== Squadron-level Operational Detachments ==
Listed are operational detachments from Wing or Group-level units that are organized and managed similarly to Squadrons, but lack the amount of aircraft assigned to be labeled as such.

Squadron Name	Insignia	Nickname	Command	Air Force	Wing	Date First Activated	Base	Aircraft	Tail Code	Notes
9th Operations Group Det 1			Air Combat Command	Sixteenth Air Force	9 RW		RAF Akrotiri, Cyprus	Operated by 99 ERS		
9th Operations Group (numerous unnamed Detachments)			Air Combat Command	Sixteenth Air Force	9 RW		Andersen AFB (Northwest Field), Guam (alleged)	RQ-180 (alleged)		
9th Operations Group (numerous unnamed Detachments)			Air Combat Command	Sixteenth Air Force	9 RW		RAF Fairford, United Kingdom (alleged)	RQ-180 (alleged)		
52nd Operations Group Det 1			United States Air Forces in Europe – Air Forces Africa	Third Air Force	52 FW	13 June 2011	Powidz AB, Poland	Forward operating location(s) for 480 FS		
52nd Operations Group Det 1			United States Air Forces in Europe – Air Forces Africa	Third Air Force	52 FW	13 June 2011	Łask AB, Poland	Forward operating location(s) for 480 FS		
52nd Operations Group Det 2		Team Bison	United States Air Forces in Europe – Air Forces Africa	Third Air Force	52 FW	1 March 2019	Miroslawiec AB, Poland	MQ-9A	(Note: Simply a forward operating location for deployed MQ-9A tails and MX support (from Air National Guard units only).)	
53rd Test and Evaluation Group (numerous unnamed Detachments)			Air Combat Command	United States Air Force Warfare Center	53 WG		Tonopah Test Range Airport, Nevada	Foreign Military Exploitation (FME); F-117A; F-16D; Numerous other unknown aircraft		
53rd Test and Evaluation Group (numerous unnamed Detachments)			Air Combat Command	United States Air Force Warfare Center	53 WG		Homey Airport, Nevada	Foreign Military Exploitation (FME); F-117A; F-16D; Numerous other unknown aircraft		
54th Fighter Group Det 1			Air Education and Training Command	Nineteenth Air Force	49 WG (Note: Wing is awaiting reassignment to Air Combat Command and 15 AF. https://www.af.mil/News/Article-Display/Article/4483621/us-air-force-reassigns-combat-training-units-to-enhance-readiness/)		Morris ANGB, Arizona	TFI Active Associate to 21 FS, 152 FS, 195 FS		
54th Fighter Group (unnamed Detachment)			Air Education and Training Command	Nineteenth Air Force	49 WG		JB San Antonio-Lackland (Kelly Field), Texas	TFI Active Associate to 182 FS		
58th Operations Group Det 1			Air Education and Training Command	Nineteenth Air Force	58 OG		MCAS New River, North Carolina	CV-22B		(Note: Operates alongside the Marine Corps' VMMT-204. The USMC provides most of the instruction and sortie generation.)
58th Operations Group Det 2			Air Education and Training Command	Nineteenth Air Force	58 OG		Kirtland AFB, New Mexico	UH-1N		
96th Operations Group Det 2			Air Force Materiel Command	Air Force Test Center	96 OG		Tinker AFB, Oklahoma	E-3G		
119th Operations Group Det 1			Air National Guard, North Dakota		119 WG		Minot AFB, North Dakota	TFI Reserve Associate to 23 BS, 69 BS		
125th Fighter Wing Det 1			Air National Guard, Florida		125 FW		Homestead ARB, Florida	Operated by 159 FS		
138th Fighter Wing Det 1		Gulf Coast Guardians	Air National Guard, Oklahoma		138 FW		Ellington Field JRB, Texas	Operated by 125 FS		
144th Fighter Wing Det 1			Air National Guard, California		144 FW		March ARB, California	Operated by 194 FS		
162nd Wing Alert Detachment			Air National Guard, Arizona		162 WG		Davis-Monthan AFB, Arizona	Operate aircraft owned by 152 FS and 195 FS		
169th Fighter Wing Alert Detachment			Air National Guard, South Carolina		169 FW		Shaw AFB, South Carolina	Operated by 157 FS		
188th Operations Group Det 2		Flying Razorbacks	Air National Guard, Arkansas		188 WG		Ebbing ANGB, Arkansas	TFI Reserve Associate to 57 FS		
214th Attack Group Det 1			Air National Guard, Arizona		214 ATKG		Libby AAF, Arizona	MQ-9A	AZ	
354th Operations Group Det 2			Pacific Air Forces	Eleventh Air Force	354 FW		Eielson AFB, Alaska	TFI Active Associate to 168 ARS		
375th Operations Group Det 1			Air Mobility Command	Eighteenth Air Force	375 OG		Mike Monroney Aeronautical Center, Oklahoma	C-143B	None	
412th Test Wing (unnamed Detachment)			Air Force Material Command	Air Force Test Center	412 TW		USAF Plant 42, California	RQ-4B		
413th Flight Test Group OL-A		Zombie Vipers	Air Force Reserve Command	Twenty-Second Air Force	413 FLTG		Davis–Monthan AFB, Arizona	QF-16A/C		
482nd Operations Group Det 1			Air Force Reserve Command	Tenth Air Force	482 FW		Shaw AFB, South Carolina	TFI Reserve Associate to 55 FS, 77 FS, 79 FS		
492nd Special Operations Training Group Det 1			Air Force Special Operations Command		492 SOTRG		Duke Field, Florida	C-146A		
944th Operations Group Det 1		Alamo Vipers	Air Force Reserve Command	Tenth Air Force	944 FW		Holloman AFB, New Mexico	TFI Reserve Associate to 8 FS, 311 FS, 314 FS		
Air Force Test Center (numerous unnamed Detachments) (alleged)			Air Force Material Command		Air Force Test Center		Edwards AFB (South Base), California	HH-60U; NT-43A; F-16D; Numerous other unknown aircraft		
Air Force Test Center (numerous unnamed Detachments) (alleged)			Air Force Material Command		Air Force Test Center		Homey Airport, Nevada	HH-60U; NT-43A; F-16D; Numerous other unknown aircraft		
Air Force Test Center (numerous unnamed Detachments) (alleged)			Air Force Material Command		Air Force Test Center		USAF Plant 42, California	HH-60U; NT-43A; F-16D; Numerous other unknown aircraft		
HQ Florida Air National Guard Det 1			Florida Air National Guard				Eglin AFB, Florida	TFI Reserve Associate to 58 FS, 60 FS		
Warner Robins ALC Det 2			Air Force Material Command	Air Force Test Center	412 OG		USAF Plant 42, California	T/U-2S		

== Squadron-sized Wing-level Units ==
Listed are units that have sufficient numbers of aircraft and aircrew assigned, but are commanded by a Colonel rank (or higher) and thus not labeled as a Squadron.

Squadron Name	Insignia	Nickname	Command	Air Force	Wing	Date First Activated	Base	Aircraft	Tail Code	Notes
612th Theater Operations Group (TOG)			Air Forces Southern				HQ: Davis-Monthan AFB, Arizona (Note: Operates from several locations in the USSOUTHCOM AOR.)	P-9A	None	
Air Force Test Center (AFTC)			Air Force Material Command			17 February 1942	Many other aircraft and unlisted units including the USAFTPS.			
ANG AFRC Test Center (AATC)		Tucson Testers	Air National Guard			13 March 1917	Morris ANGB, Arizona	F-16C (Blocks 25 & 32)	AT	(Note: Only the F-16C and A-10C aircraft and aircrew are permanently assigned. All other aircraft are periodically "borrowed" from other ANG & AFRC Squadrons, or are operated via "test detachments", also known as a Combined Test Force (CTF), using AATC aircrew based at other squadrons. Some of these detachments have specially marked aircraft reflecting that responsibility.)
ANG AFRC Test Center (AATC)		Tucson Testers	Air National Guard			13 March 1917	Morris ANGB, Arizona	A-10C	DP	(Note: Only the F-16C and A-10C aircraft and aircrew are permanently assigned. All other aircraft are periodically "borrowed" from other ANG & AFRC Squadrons, or are operated via "test detachments", also known as a Combined Test Force (CTF), using AATC aircrew based at other squadrons. Some of these detachments have specially marked aircraft reflecting that responsibility.)
ANG AFRC Test Center (AATC)		Tucson Testers	Air National Guard			13 March 1917	Numerous Test Detachments at varying locations	C-130H; C-130J; F-15C/D; F-15EX; F-35A; KC-46A; KC-135R; HC-130J; HH-60W; MQ-9A		(Note: Only the F-16C and A-10C aircraft and aircrew are permanently assigned. All other aircraft are periodically "borrowed" from other ANG & AFRC Squadrons, or are operated via "test detachments", also known as a Combined Test Force (CTF), using AATC aircrew based at other squadrons. Some of these detachments have specially marked aircraft reflecting that responsibility.)

== See also ==
- United States Air Force
- List of United States Air Force squadrons
- List of wings of the United States Air Force
- List of United States Navy aircraft squadrons
- List of active United States Marine Corps aircraft squadrons
