= List of United States Air Force ground observer squadrons =

A list of the United States Air Force ground observer squadrons.

Squadron	Insignia	Location	Active	Note
4670th Ground Observer Squadron		Roslyn AFS, New York	Discontinued	Eastern Air Defense Force 1 May 1951 – 6 Feb 1952
4670th Ground Observer Squadron		Roslyn AFS, New York	Discontinued	26th Air Division 6 Feb 1952 – 1 Mar 1959
4671st Ground Observer Squadron		Selfridge AFB, Michigan	Discontinued	Eastern Air Defense Force 1 May 1951 - Apr 1952
4671st Ground Observer Squadron		Willow Run AFS, New York	Discontinued	30th Air Division Apr 1952 - 1 Mar 1959
4672d Ground Observer Squadron		Fort Snelling, Minnesota	Discontinued	Central Air Defense Force 9 May 1951 – 4 Jun 1951
4672d Ground Observer Squadron		Fort Snelling, Minnesota	Discontinued	31st Air Division 4 Jun 1951 – 1 Jan 1959
4672d Ground Observer Squadron		Snelling AFS, Minnesota	Discontinued	29th Air Division 1 Jan 1959 – 31 Mar 1959
4673d Ground Observer Squadron		Stewart AFB, New York	Discontinued	Eastern Air Defense Force 1 May 1951 Feb 1952
4673d Ground Observer Squadron		Hancock Field / Syracuse AFS, New York	Discontinued	32d Air Division Feb 1952 - 15 Aug 1958
4673d Ground Observer Squadron		Snelling AFS, Minnesota	Discontinued	26th Air Division 15 Aug 1958 – 16 Oct 1958
4674th Ground Observer Squadron		Dobbins AFB, Georgia	Discontinued	Central Air Defense Force 23 Jun 1951 – 1 Oct 1951
4674th Ground Observer Squadron		Dobbins AFB, Georgia	Discontinued	35th Air Division 1 Oct 1951 – 15 Nov 1958
4674th Ground Observer Squadron		Dobbins AFB, Georgia	Discontinued	32d Air Division 15 Nov 1958 – 1 Mar 1959
4679th Ground Observer Squadron		Kirtland AFB, New Mexico	Discontinued	34th Air Division 1 Jan 1955 – 1 Mar 1959
4715th Ground Observer Squadron		Grandview AFB / Richards-Gebaur AFB, Missouri	Discontinued	20th Air Division 8 Oct 1955 – 1 Mar 1959
4716th Ground Observer Squadron		Andrews AFB, Maryland	Discontinued	85th Air Division 8 Sep 1955 - 1 Sep 1958
4716th Ground Observer Squadron		Andrews AFB, Maryland	Discontinued	26th Air Division 1 Sep 1958 – 16 Oct 1958
4717th Ground Observer Squadron		Wright-Patterson AFB, Ohio	Discontinued	58th Air Division 8 Sep 1955 – 1 Sep 1958
4718th Ground Observer Squadron		Truax Field, Wisconsin	Discontinued	37th Air Division 8 Sep 1955 - Feb 1957
4718th Ground Observer Squadron		Green Bay Air Defense Filter Center, Wisconsin	Discontinued	37th Air Division Feb 1957 - 1 Mar 1959
4755th Ground Observer Squadron		Geiger Field, Washington	Discontinued	9th Air Division 1 Oct 1955 – 25 Mar 1959
4768th Ground Observer Squadron		Tinker AFB / Oklahoma City AFS, Oklahoma	Discontinued	33d Air Division 1 Jan 1955 – 1 Mar 1959
4770th Ground Observer Squadron		McChord AFB, Washington	Discontinued	25th Air Division 16 Apr 1951 – 25 Mar 1959
4770th Ground Observer Squadron		Portland Air Defense Filter Center, Oregon	Discontinued	25th Air Division Feb 1957 - 25 Mar 1959
4771st Ground Observer Squadron		Norton AFB, California	Discontinued	27th Air Division 16 Apr 1951 – 25 Mar 1959
4772d Ground Observer Squadron		Hamilton AFB, California	Discontinued	28th Air Division 16 Apr 1951 – 25 Mar 1959
4773d Ground Observer Squadron		Great Falls AFB / Malmstrom AFB, Montana	Discontinued	29th Air Division 16 Apr 1951 – 25 Mar 1959

== See also ==
- List of United States Air Force squadrons
- Ground Observer Corps
