= List of United States Air Force aircraft sustainment squadrons =

This article is a list of United States Air Force aircraft sustainment squadrons both active, inactive, and historical. An aircraft sustainment squadron's purpose is to maintain the fleet in a state of combat readiness.

== List ==
Squadron	Location	Aircraft Supported	Group
500th ACSS	Hill AFB, Utah	F-16 Weapons Systems	508th ACSG
501st ACSS	Hill AFB, Utah	F-16 (USAF)	508th ACSG
502d ACSS	Hill AFB, Utah	F-16 (International)	508th ACSG
503d ACSS	Hill AFB, Utah	A-10 Weapons Systems	538th ACSG
504th ACSS	Hill AFB, Utah	A-10 Programs	538th ACSG
505th ACSS	Hill AFB, Utah	Proven Aircraft	558th ACSG
506th ACSS	Hill AFB, Utah	T-37/T-38	558th ACSG
507th ACSS	Hill AFB, Utah	Training Simulators	558th ACSG
509th ICBMSS	Hill AFB, Utah	Ground Systems	526th ICBMSG
510th ICBMSS	Hill AFB, Utah	Flight Systems	526th ICBMSG
511th ICBMSS	Hill AFB, Utah	Future Systems	526th ICBMSG
551st ACSS	Hill AFB, Utah		558th ACSG
536th ACSS	Tinker AFB, Oklahoma	F100/TF33	
537th ACSS	Tinker AFB, Oklahoma	F101/F108/F110/F118	
538th ACSS	Tinker AFB, Oklahoma	TF39/TF56/Specialty	
539th ACSS	Tinker AFB, Oklahoma	International Engines	
540th ACSS	Tinker AFB, Oklahoma	B-52	
541st ACSS	Tinker AFB, Oklahoma	Unknown	
544th ACSS	Tinker AFB, Oklahoma	Tanker/Airlift	
545th ACSS	Tinker AFB, Oklahoma	VIP/SAM	
546th ACSS	Tinker AFB, Oklahoma	Special Duty	
547th ACSS	Tinker AFB, Oklahoma	HF Global Communications Systems	
550th ACSS	Tinker AFB, Oklahoma	KC-135 Combat Support	
551st ACSS	Tinker AFB, Oklahoma	KC-135 Modifications	
552d ACSS	Tinker AFB, Oklahoma	KC-135 PDM Support	
553d ACSS	Tinker AFB, Oklahoma	B-1 Production Support	
554th ACSS	Tinker AFB, Oklahoma	B-1 Combat Support	
555th ACSS	Tinker AFB, Oklahoma	B-1 Modifications	
556th ACSS	Tinker AFB, Oklahoma	B-2	
557th ACSS	Tinker AFB, Oklahoma	E-3	
558th ACSS	Tinker AFB, Oklahoma	Air Traffic Control & Landing Systems	
560th ACSS	Robins AFB, Georgia	C-130 Program Mgmt	330th ACSG
561st ACSS	Robins AFB, Georgia	C-130 Foreign Military Sales	330th ACSG
564th ACSS	Robins AFB, Georgia	C-17 Program Mgmt	730th ACSG
565th ACSS	Robins AFB, Georgia	C-5 Program Mgmt	730th ACSG
568th ACSS	Robins AFB, Georgia	F-15 Program Mgmt	830th ACSG
569th ACSS	Robins AFB, Georgia	F-15 Foreign Military Sales	830th ACSG
572d ACSS	Robins AFB, Georgia	Special Ops Fixed-wing Program Mgmt	580th ACSG
573d ACSS	Robins AFB, Georgia	Special Ops Rotary-wing Program Mgmt	580th ACSG
576th ACSS	Robins AFB, Georgia	U-2/Global Hawk	560th ACSG
577th ACSS	Robins AFB, Georgia	J-STARS	560th ACSG
578th ACSS	Robins AFB, Georgia	DCGS/Special Projects	560th ACSG

== See also ==
- List of United States Air Force squadrons
