= List of United States Air Force technical operations squadrons =

The Air Force Technical Applications Center, originally organized in 1959 as 1035th U.S. Air Force Field Activities Group, operated five technical operation squadrons to support its nuclear treaty monitoring mission. A 2014 reorganization of the AF Technical Applications Center resulted in the activation of a single squadron

Squadron	Shield	Location	Dates	Note
Technical Operations Squadron		Patrick Air Force Base, FL	2014 – 1 Apr 2018	
1155th Technical Operations Squadron		McClellan Air Force Base, CA	1 Jul 1960 – 30 Sep 1999	renamed Technical Operations Division
1156th Technical Operations Squadron		Wheeler Air Force Base, HI	1 Jul 1960 – 1 Oct 1991	renamed Pacific Technical Operations Area
1157th Technical Operations Squadron		Wiesbaden Air Base, GermanyLindsey AS, Germany	1 Jul 1960 – 1 Oct 1991	renamed European Technical Operations Area
1158th Technical Operations Squadron			1 Feb 1966 – 31 Mar 1971	
1159th Technical Operations Squadron			1 Jul 1966 – 30 Jun 1973	

== See also ==
- List of United States Air Force squadrons
- Air Force Technical Applications Center (AFTAC)
