= List of United States Air Force air defense squadrons =

This is a list of United States Air Force air defence squadrons. The list provides the squadron name, shield and the location of its installation.

Air Defense Squadrons
Squadron	Shield	Location	Note
Air Defense Squadron			
20th Air Defense Squadron			
21st Air Defense Squadron			
24th Expeditionary Air Defense Squadron			
140th Air Defense Squadron			
176th Air Defense Squadron		Elmendorf AFB	
701st Air Defense Squadron		Tyndall AFB	
722nd Air Defense Squadron		North Bay, Canada	
848th Air Defense Squadron		Wallace AS	
858th Air Defense Squadron			
4700th Air Defense Squadron			
4750th Air Defense Squadron			
4751st Air Defense Squadron			
4753rd Air Defense Squadron		Otis AFB	
4756th Air Defense Squadron			
4757th Air Defense Squadron			
4780th Air Defense Squadron		Perrin AFB	

== See also ==
- List of United States Air Force squadrons
