= List of United States Air Force aggressor squadrons =

This article lists the aggressor squadrons of the United States Air Force. The purpose of aggressor squadrons is to prepare Air Force combat aircrews by providing challenging, realistic threat replication, training, test support, academics and feedback.

== Aggressor squadrons ==
Squadron	Shield	Location	Nickname	Note
18th Aggressor Squadron		Eielson AFB		Red Flag - Alaska
26th Space Aggressor Squadron		Schriever AFB		USAFR Space Aggressors
64th Aggressor Squadron		Nellis AFB		Red Flag
65th Aggressor Squadron		Nellis AFB		Red Flag
92d Information Warfare Aggressor Squadron		Lackland AFB		Information Warfare Aggressors
262d Information Warfare Aggressor Squadron		McChord AFB		ANG unit
507th Air Defense Aggressor Squadron		Nellis AFB		
527th Space Aggressor Squadron		Schriever AFB		Space Electromagnetic Warfare Aggressors
57th Space Aggressor Squadron		Schriever AFB		Space Orbital Warfare Aggressors

== See also ==
- List of United States Air Force squadrons
