= List of United States Air Force squadrons =

The United States Air Force and its predecessors include a number of specialized Air Force Squadrons. These units vary widely in size and may include several hundred enlisted airmen commanded by an officer in the rank of captain to lieutenant colonel. A squadron may include two or three subordinate flights. In turn the squadron may be part of a group and then a wing.

An Air Force squadron is the basic unit of the service and may carry the lineage and honors of units over a century ago.

== United States Army Air Service ==
- Aero Squadrons
- Balloon Squadrons

== United States Air Force ==
- Aerial Port
- Aerial Target
- Aeromedical Evacuation
- Aggressor
- Air Base
- Airborne Air Control
- Airborne Command and Control
- Aircraft Control and Warning
- Aircraft Sustainment
- Air Control
- Air Defense
- Airlift
- Air Operations
- Air Refueling
- Air Support Operations
- Attack
- Bomb
- Civil Engineering
- Combat Camera
- Combat Communications
- Combat Operations
- Communications
- Comptroller
- Defense Systems Evaluation
- Electronic Combat
- Electronic Systems
- Electronic Warfare
- Field Investigative
- Fighter Squadrons
- Ground Observer
- Helicopter
- Information Operations
- Intelligence
- Missile
- Munitions
- Network
- Operational Weather
- Operations
- Operations Support
- Presidential Airlift
- Prime BEEF
- Radar
- Reconnaissance
- Recruiting
- RED HORSE
- Rescue
- Security Forces
- Special Operations
- Special Tactics
- Support
- Technical Operations
- Test
- Test and Evaluation
- Training
- USAF Air Demonstration
- Weapons
- Weather
- Weather Reconnaissance

== See also ==
- List of active United States Air Force aircraft squadrons
- List of USAAF squadron codes, as used in Europe during World War II
- List of United States Navy aircraft squadrons
