= 50th Flying Training Squadron =

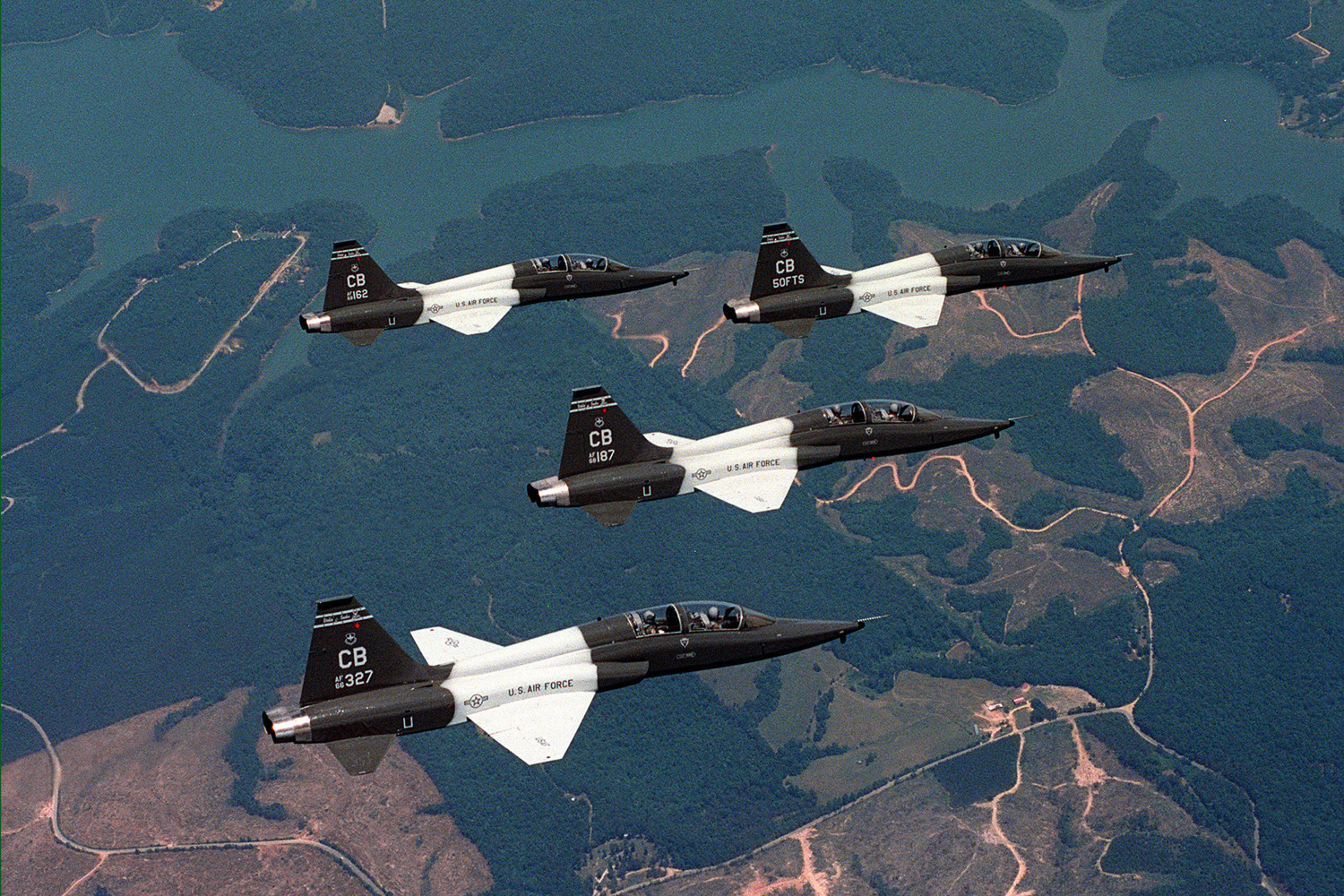
- Four T-38Cs from Columbus AFB
- Active: 1941-1944; 1947-1949; 1972-2025
- Country: United States
- Branch: United States Air Force
- Role: Undergraduate Pilot Training
- Nickname: Strikin' Snakes
- Engagements: European Theater of Operations
- Decorations: Air Force Outstanding Unit Award

Insignia
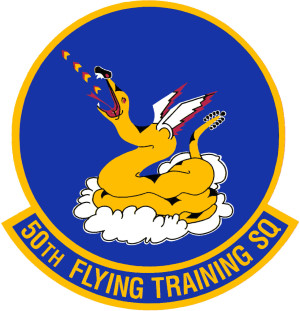
- 50th Flying Training Squadron emblem

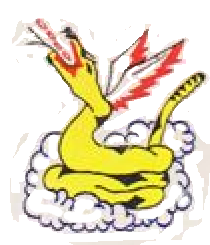
- 50th Pursuit Squadron emblem (Note: Approved 1 April 1942. Description: From a bank of clouds argent a winged rattlesnake coiled to strike or, marked sable, head erect, open mouth gules, toothed of the first [color] emitting from the mouth four projectiles of the fourth [color]; winged of the first [color] bordered of the last [color], tail erect showing rattle of the third [color].)
- Tail Code at Columbus AFB: CB

The 50th Flying Training Squadron is an inactive squadron of the United States Air Force. It was last active as part of the 14th Flying Training Wing at Columbus Air Force Base, Mississippi, where it was inactivated in July 2025. It operated Northrop T-38C Talon aircraft conducting flight training there from 1972.

The squadron was first activated in January 1941 as the 50th Pursuit Squadron. Following the attack on Pearl Harbor, it participated in the air defense of the Pacific Coast. In August 1942, it moved to Iceland, where it participated in the defense of the North Atlantic as the 50th Fighter Squadron until the summer of 1944, when it moved to England and was disbanded. The squadron was again activated in the reserve in June 1947, but apparently was not fully manned or equipped before inactivating in June 1949.

== History ==
=== World War II ===
==== Initial organization ====
The squadron was first activated at Hamilton Field, California in January 1941 as the 50th Pursuit Squadron, one of the original three sqadrons of the 14th Pursuit Group. It was originally equipped with Curtiss P-40 Warhawks, but by early 1942 converted to Lockheed P-38 Lightnings. Following the attack on Pearl Harbor, it flew patrols with its Lightnings over the West Coast of the United States starting in February 1942, operating from bases in the San Francisco Bay area. It ended air defense patrols in June 1942, and shipped to the European Theater of Operations (ETO) in July. The air echelon ferried its planes via the North Atlantic Ferry Route, while the ground echelon sailed on the USS West Point.

==== Air defense of Iceland ====
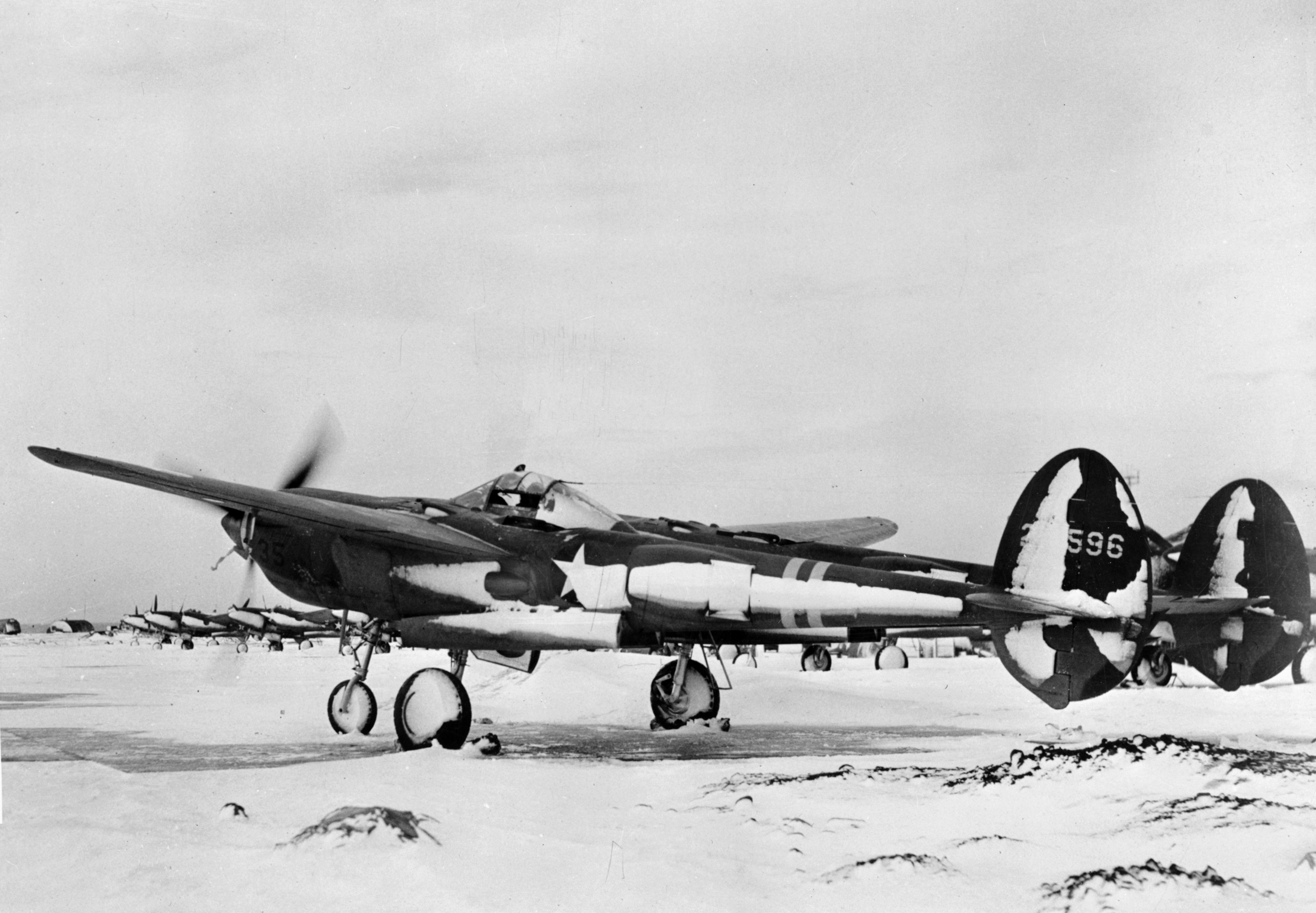
Squadron P-38 Lightning in Iceland in 1942 (Note: Aircraft is Lockheed P-38F-5-LO Lightning, serial 42-12596.)

The squadron's ground echelon arrived at its ETO station, RAF Atcham on 18 August 1942, but was transferred to the 4th Fighter Group, when the 4th was activated in September. Meanwhile, its air echelon halted its movement to England and began operating from Meeks Field, Iceland after arrival there while ferrying its Lightnings across the Atlantic. This arrangement was formalized in November, when Meeks Field became its official station and it was reassigned to the 342d Composite Group. From Iceland, it intercepted Luftwaffe bomber and reconnaissance aircraft as its primary mission while also performing antisubmarine patrols and escorting ship convoys through the North Atlantic. Squadron pilots downed five enemy aircraft in combat.

After the summer of 1943, little German activity was noted over the North Atlantic skies. The enemy was on the defensive, and American defensive outposts in the Atlantic were shifting to secondary roles. In February 1944 the squadron became non operational and its pilots returned to England. In England the squadron was attached to the 8th Reconnaissance Group (Provisional). Its pilots retrained with de Havilland Mosquitos, which were used to provide weather information over occupied Europe. In August 1944, the provisional group was replaced by the 25th Bombardment Group and its Mosquito pilots formed the 653rd and 654th Bombardment Squadrons, while the 50th was disbanded.

=== Air Force reserves ===
The squadron activated in the reserve at Offutt Field, Nebraska in June 1947. In September, it was assigned to the 381st Bombardment Group At Offutt, its training was supervised by the 4131st AAF Base Unit (later the 2473rd Air Force Reserve Training Center) of Air Defense Command (ADC). The squadron was not equipped with operational aircraft, but flew North American AT-6 Texans. In July 1948, Continental Air Command assumed responsibility for managing reserve and Air National Guard units from ADC. The 50th was inactivated in June 1949 when Continental Air Command reorganized its reserve units under the wing base organization system. and the 438th Troop Carrier Wing replaced the 381st Group and its reserve elements at Offutt.

=== Flying training ===
In June 1972, the 14th Flying Training Wing absorbed the resources of the 3650th Pilot Training Wing at Columbus Air Force Base, Mississippi as Air Training Command replaced its Major Command controlled flying training units with Air Force controlled units. (Note: MAJCON units could not carry a permanent history or lineage. Ravenstein, Charles A. (1984). A Guide to Air Force Lineage and Honors (2d, Revised ed.). Maxwell AFB, AL: USAF Historical Research Center. p. 12.) In this reorganization, the squadron absorbed the mission, personnel and equipment of the 3651st Pilot Training Squadron, which was simutaneously inactivated.

The squadron conducted advanced undergraduate pilot training from June 1972 to July 2025. When Specializedd Undergraduate Pilot Training was introduced in the early 1990s, the squadron provided advanced training to students in the pipeline to become bomber or fighter pilots. It conducted the advanced phase of undergraduate pilot training. This phase consisted of flight instruction in the Northrop T-38C Talon. Training included advanced aircraft handling, tactical navigation, fluid maneuvering and an increased emphasis in two- and four-ship formation. At the completion of training, graduates were awarded the aeronautical rating of pilot. With the inactivation of the 50th, its aircraft and personnel were transferred to the 49th Flying Training Squadron, which became Air Education and Training Command's first T-38 "super squadron'. This action will merge the former T-38 advanced Undergraduate Pilot Training program and the Introcuction to Fighter Funamentals course into a course titled Fighter bomber Fundamentals.

== Lineage ==
- Constituted as the 50th Pursuit Squadron (Fighter) on 20 November 1940

Activated on 15 January 1941
Redesignated 50th Fighter Squadron (Twin Engine) on 15 May 1942
Redesignated 50th Fighter Squadron, Two Engine on 28 February 1944
Disbanded on 9 August 1944

- Reconstituted and redesignated 50th Fighter Squadron (All Weather) on 23 May 1947

Activated in the reserve on 12 June 1947
Inactivated on 27 June 1949

- Redesignated 50th Flying Training Squadron on 22 Mar 1972

Activated on 1 June 1972
Inactivated c. 2 July 2025 (Note: 2 July was the date of the ceremony marking the squadron's inactivation. Prince; Davis.)

=== Assignments ===
- 14th Pursuit Group (later 14th Fighter Group), 15 January 1941
- 342d Composite Group, 14 November 1942
- Eighth Air Force, February – 9 August 1944 (attached to 8th Reconnaissance Group (Provisional) [later, 802d Reconnaissance Group (Provisional)])
- Second Air Force, 12 June 1947
- 381st Bombardment Group, 30 September 1947 – 27 June 1949
- 14th Flying Training Wing, 1 June 1972
- 14th Operations Group, 15 December 1991 – c. 2 July 2025

=== Stations ===
- Hamilton Field, California, 15 January 1941
- March Field, California, 10 June 1941
- Metropolitan Oakland Municipal Airport, California, 8 February 1942
- Hamilton Field, California, 9 May – 16 July 1942
- RAF Atcham (Station 342), England, 18 August 1942 (operated from Meeks Field, Iceland)
- Meeks Field, Iceland, 14 November 1942
- RAF Nuthampstead (Station 131), England, February 1944
- RAF Cheddington (Station 113), England, c. 15 March 1944
- RAF Watton (Station 376), England, 12 April – 9 August 1944
- Offutt Field (later Offutt Air Force Base), Nebraska, 12 June 1947 – 27 June 1949
- Columbus Air Force Base, Mississippi, 1 Jun 1972 – c. 2 Jul 2025)

=== Aircraft ===
- Curtiss P-40 Warhawk (1941–1942)
- Lockheed P-38 Lightning (1942–1944)
- North American AT-6 (later T-6) Texan (1947–1949)
- Northrop T-38A Talon (1972–2003)
- Northrop T-38C Talon (2002–2025)

=== Awards and campaigns ===
Award streamer	Award	Dates	Notes
	Air Force Outstanding Unit Award	1 January-31 December 1974	50th Flying Training Squadron
	Air Force Outstanding Unit Award	1 April 1985-31 March 1987	50th Flying Training Squadron
	Air Force Outstanding Unit Award	1 July 1992-30 June 1994	50th Flying Training Squadron
	Air Force Outstanding Unit Award	1 July 1997-30 June 1999	50th Flying Training Squadron
	Air Force Outstanding Unit Award	1 July 1999-30 June 2001	50th Flying Training Squadron
	Air Force Outstanding Unit Award	1 July 2001-30 June 2002	50th Flying Training Squadron
	Air Force Outstanding Unit Award	1 July 2002-30 June 2004	50th Flying Training Squadron
	Air Force Outstanding Unit Award	1 July 2004-30 June 2006	50th Flying Training Squadron
	Air Force Outstanding Unit Award	1 July 2006-30 June 2007	50th Flying Training Squadron
	Air Force Outstanding Unit Award	1 July 2007-30 June 2009	50th Flying Training Squadron
	Air Force Outstanding Unit Award	1 July 2009-30 June 2010	50th Flying Training Squadron
	Air Force Outstanding Unit Award	1 July 2010-30 June 2011	50th Flying Training Squadron
	Air Force Outstanding Unit Award	1 July 2012-30 June 2014	50th Flying Training Squadron
	Air Force Outstanding Unit Award	1 July 2014-30 June 2015	50th Flying Training Squadron
	Air Force Outstanding Unit Award	1 July 2016-30 June 2017	50th Flying Training Squadron
	Air Force Outstanding Unit Award	1 July 2017-30 June 2018	50th Flying Training Squadron
	Air Force Outstanding Unit Award	1 July 2020-30 June 2021	50th Flying Training Squadron

Campaign Streamer	Campaign	Dates	Notes
	Air Offensive, Europe	18 August 1942–9 August 1944	50th Fighter Squadron
	Air Combat, EAME Theater	18 August 1942–9 August 1944	50th Fighter Squadron

== See also ==
- List of Lockheed P-38 Lightning operators
- ATL Braves opening day, Elizabeth Cook singing National Anthem, Jets Fly over, 2011 (Flyover by T-38s of the 50th starts at 1:28)
