= William L. Leverette =

American World War II flying ace

William Lawrence Leverette
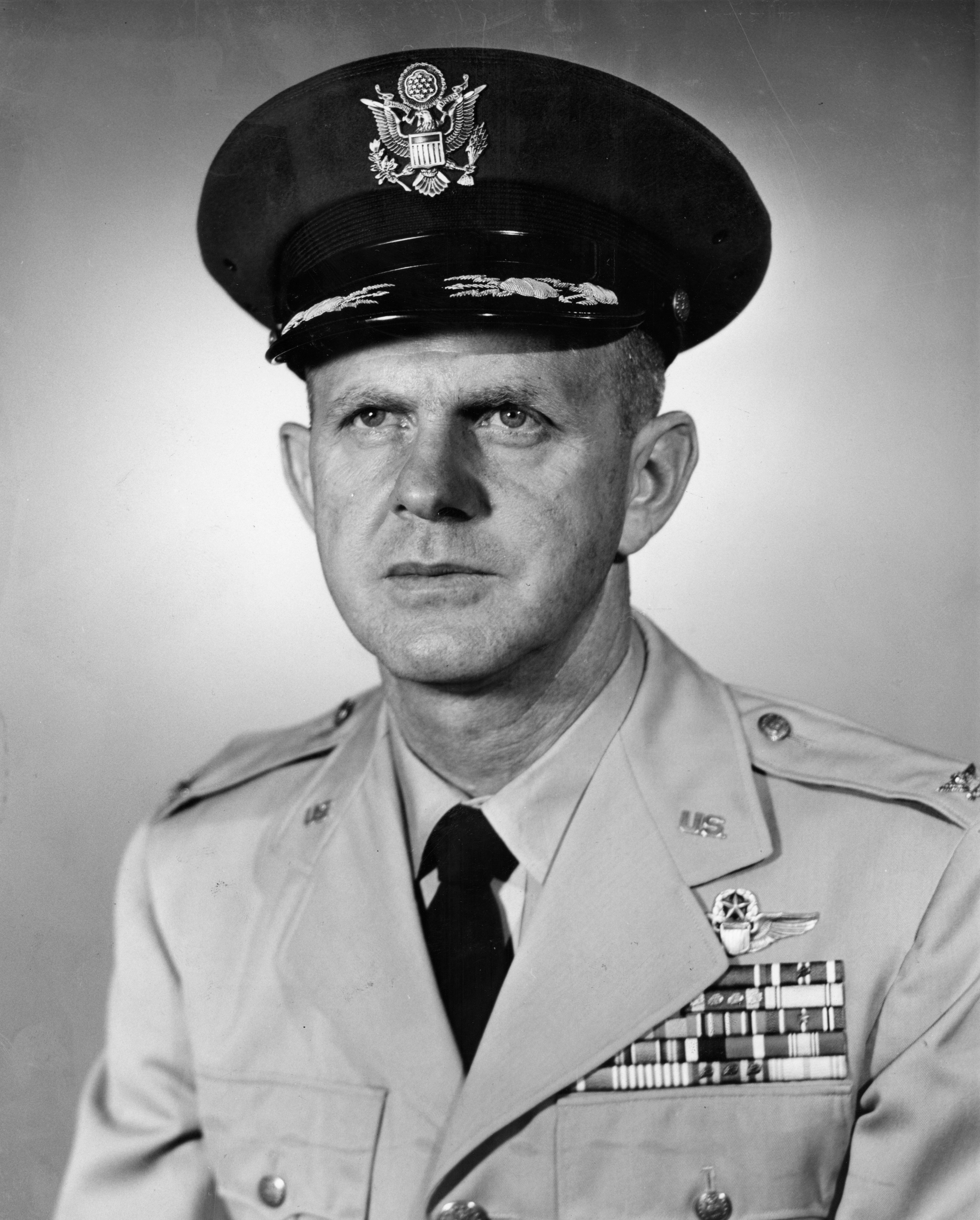
- Born: September 5, 1913; Palatka, Florida, US
- Died: April 7, 2003 (aged 89) Beaverton, Oregon, US
- Buried: Arlington National Cemetery
- Allegiance: United States
- Branch: United States Army Air Corps; United States Army Air Forces; United States Air Force
- Service years: 1939–1965
- Rank: Colonel
- Commands: 37th Fighter Squadron, 14th Fighter Group
- Conflicts: World War II: Dodecanese campaign; Italian campaign
- Awards: Distinguished Service Cross; Distinguished Flying Cross (2); Air Medal (20); Order of Alexander Nevsky (USSR)

William Lawrence Leverette (September 5, 1913 – April 7, 2003) was a United States Air Force colonel. During World War II, he became a flying ace credited with 11 aerial victories, including seven in one day for which he was awarded the Distinguished Service Cross.

== Early life and career ==
William L. Leverette was born on September 5, 1913, in Palatka, Florida. He earned a B.S. degree in mechanical engineering from Clemson University in 1934, and later earned a master's degree in aeronautical engineering from Princeton University in 1948.

In 1939, Leverette joined the United States Army Air Corps. In 1940, he earned his flying wings. Leverette transferred to the new United States Army Air Forces and spent the next few years teaching aerial combat tactics.

== World War II ==
In August 1943, Major Leverette was made the commanding officer of the 37th Fighter Squadron, 14th Fighter Group, Twelfth Air Force. The 14th Fighter Group flew P-38 Lightnings and was based at Sainte Marie du Zit Airfield in Tunisia. In September, Leverette's fighter group was moved to RAF Gambut 2 near Tobruk, Libya, in order to support operations in the Aegean Sea.

=== Ace in a day ===
On October 9, Major Leverette led nine P-38s on a mission to protect a Royal Navy convoy off the island of Rhodes, Greece. Two of the P-38s soon experienced engine trouble and were forced to turn back. When the remaining seven planes reached the convoy at noon, they found the five ships had been attacked. One cruiser, HMS Carlisle, was billowing smoke; and one destroyer, HMS Panther, was sunk.

While circling the convoy, one of the pilots spotted approximately 25 German Junkers Ju-87 Stuka dive-bombers approaching to commence another attack. Major Leverette dispatched three P-38s to maintain position over the convoy as he led the other three P-38s against the 25 Stukas.

Major Leverette attacked the formation of enemy aircraft from the rear, quickly shooting down two of the Stukas before their rear gunners even had a chance to return fire. Leverette observed both planes crash into the sea as he turned to make another pass at the formation. Leverette drew fire from the tail gunners on his second pass, but managed to shoot down two more Stukas.

Major Leverette then made a third pass on the Stukas, claiming two more victories. He also observed several men bailing out of the Stukas. Leverette's element leader, Second Lieutenant Harry T. Hanna, observed one plane Leverette had downed splash into the water.

While closing on a seventh Stuka, the tail gunner opened fire on Leverette. Leverette returned fire, silencing the tail gunner as the aircraft nosed down. Leverette was approaching too fast to pull up and over the Stuka, and attempted to fly underneath it. While three feet of Leverette's left propeller cut through the Stuka when the two planes collided, his P-38 remained airworthy.

The entire engagement had lasted approximately fifteen minutes. The four P-38s shot down 16 Stukas and a Junkers Ju 88. Major Leverette claimed a total of seven Stukas shot down and was awarded the Distinguished Service Cross for his actions. Lieutenant Hanna also became an ace in a day, claiming five Stukas and was awarded the Distinguished Flying Cross.

The opponent was the II./StG 3. According to the german records, the Stuka unit has lost minimum 6 planes over the sea and one more crashlanded on Rhodos.

Major Leverette was the first of just two Army Airmen to shoot down seven enemy aircraft in a single combat mission. The other, William A. Shomo, claimed seven victories in 1945 and was awarded the Medal of Honor.

=== Later war service ===
Major Leverette's squadron returned to the Italian campaign, and he downed four more German planes, two Me-109s and two Me-110s. Finishing the war with 11 aerial victories, Leverette was one of the highest scoring American aces in the Mediterranean Theater. In addition to the Distinguished Service Cross, he was awarded the Distinguished Flying Cross with one oak leaf cluster, the Air Medal with nineteen oak leaf clusters and the Order of Alexander Nevsky from the Soviet Union.

== Post-war career and life ==
Leverette stayed in the military after the war, transferring to the newly formed United States Air Force in 1947. Leverette also graduated from the Air War College, Class of 1957. He retired from the Air Force in 1965 with the rank of colonel.

William L. Leverette died on April 7, 2003, in Beaverton, Oregon. He was laid to rest in Arlington National Cemetery in September.
