= 14th Operations Group =

14th Operations Group

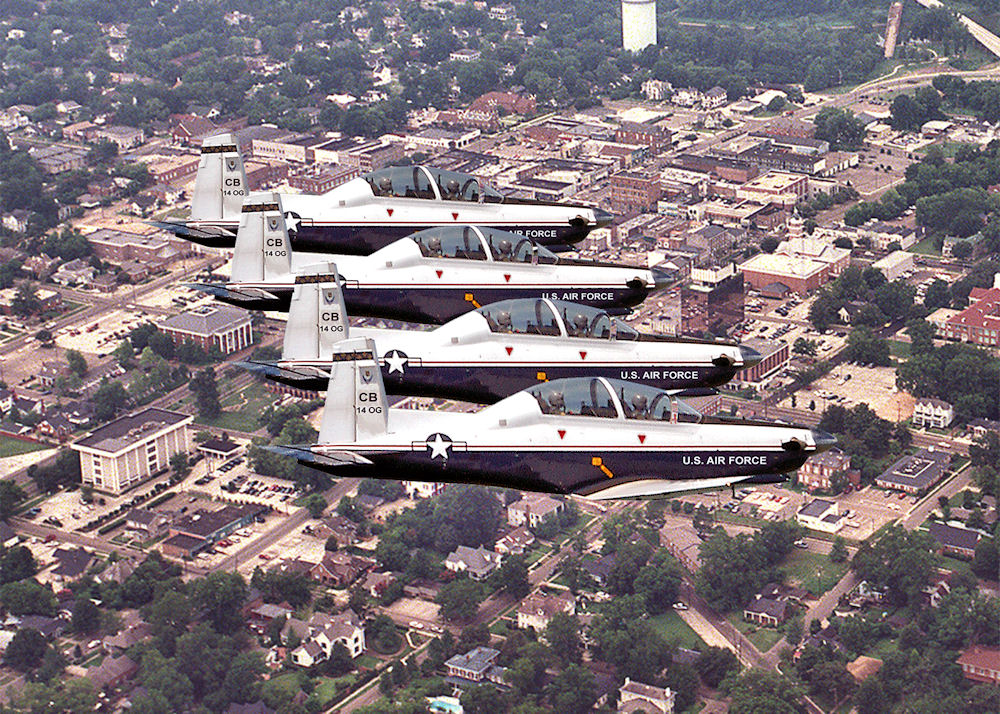
- T-6 Texan IIs over Columbus, Mississippi
- Active: 1941–1945; 1946–1949; 1955–1960; 1991–present
- Country: United States
- Branch: United States Air Force
- Type: Pilot Training
- Size: Group
- Part of: Air Education and Training Command: Nineteenth Air Force; 14th Flying Training Wing
- Garrison/HQ: Columbus Air Force Base, Mississippi
- Nickname: Blaze
- Mottos: To Fight to Death (1941–1960); Day and Night – Peace and War (Wing Motto, 1991–present)
- Engagements: European theater of World War II
- Decorations: Distinguished Unit Citation; Air Force Outstanding Unit Award

Commanders
- Current commander: Col. Stan Lawrie
- Notable commanders: General Robert H. Foglesong

Insignia
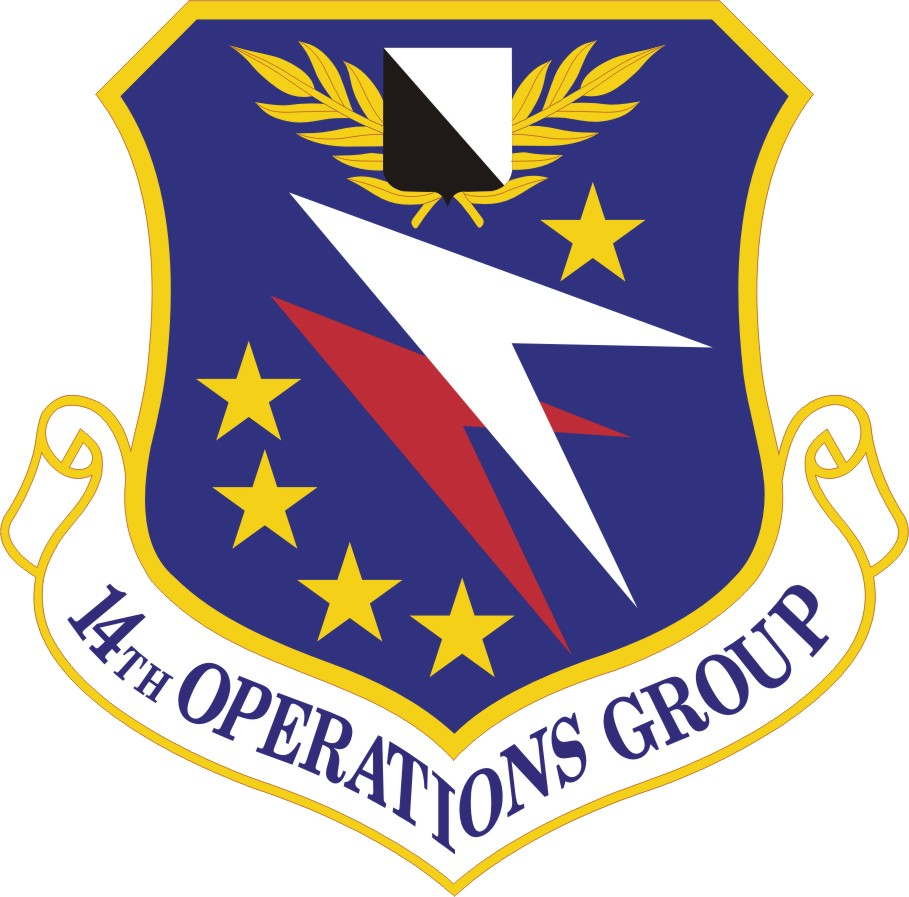
- 14th Operations Group emblem (Note: The group uses the wing emblem with the group designation on the scroll. Robertson)

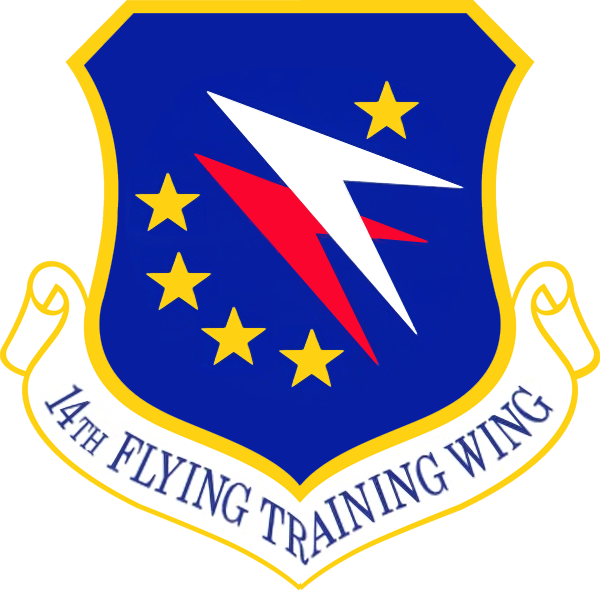
- 14th Flying Training Wing emblem from 1991–2007

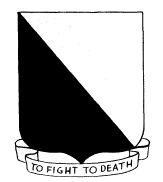
- 14th Fighter Group emblem (approved 17 June 1942)

The 14th Operations Group is the flying component of the 14th Flying Training Wing, assigned to the United States Air Force's Air Education and Training Command. The group is stationed at Columbus Air Force Base, Mississippi.

The group was first activated in 1941 as the 14th Pursuit Group at Hamilton Field, California. For a short time following the Attack on Pearl Harbor it flew patrols along the Pacific coast. It moved to the United Kingdom as the 14th Fighter Group in the summer of 1942 and was the first fighter unit to ferry its own aircraft across the Atlantic. After combat training with the Royal Air Force, the group moved to the Mediterranean Theater of Operations following Operation Torch, the North Africa invasion. It continued in combat until V-E Day, earning a Distinguished Unit Citation for defending bombers attacking a target in Austria in 1944. It was inactivated in Italy in September 1945.

The 14th was again activated at Dow Field, Maine in 1946 as part of Air Defense Command (ADC). It became the first Army Air Forces combat unit to equip with the Republic P-84 Thunderjet. The group was inactivated in 1949 when reductions in the Department of Defense budget required a reduction of groups in the United States Air Force (USAF) to 48.

In the summer of 1955 the group was activated at Ethan Allen Air Force Base, where it assumed the mission, personnel and equipment of the 517th Air Defense Group under ADC's Project Arrow, which was designed to replace post-war units with fighter organizations with distinguished combat records. It remained there until 1960, when it was inactivated.

The group was again activated as the 14th Operations Group at Columbus Air Force Base, Mississippi in December 1991 and assumed its current mission of training pilots for the USAF.

== Components ==
The 14th Operations Group (Tail Code: CB) consists of the following squadrons:

- 37th Flying Training Squadron (37 FTS) Bengal Tigers (T-6 Texan II)
- 41st Flying Training Squadron (41 FTS) Flying Buzzsaws (T-6 Texan II)
- 48th Flying Training Squadron (48 FTS) Alley Cats (T-1 Jayhawk)
- 49th Fighter Training Squadron (49 FTS) Black Knights (T-38 Talon)
- 14th Operations Support Squadron (14 OSS) Scream'n Eagles
- 14th Student Squadron (14 STUS) Proud Eagles

== History ==
=== World War II ===
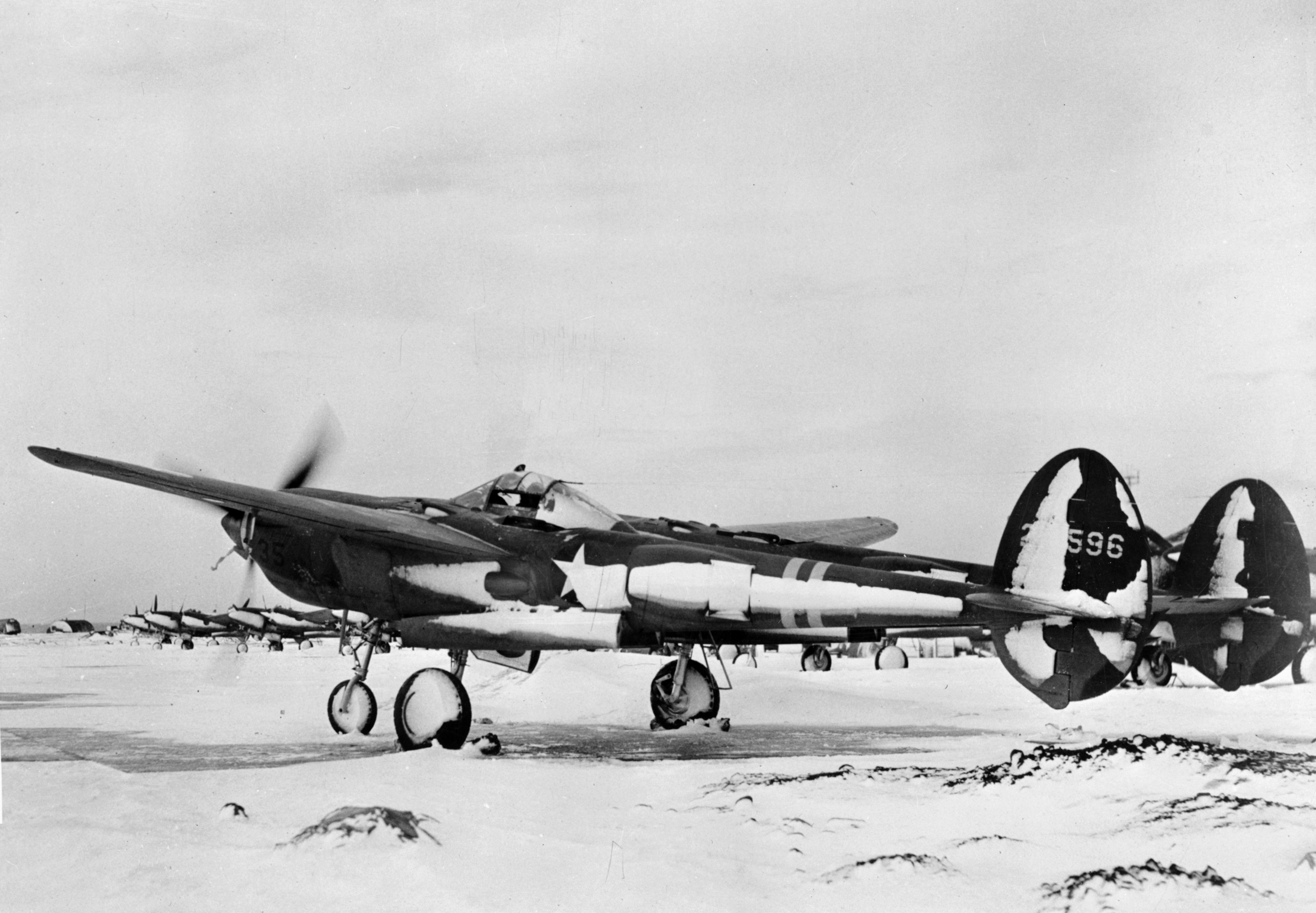
50th Fighter Squadron P-38F in Iceland, 1942 (Note: Aircraft is Lockheed P-38F-5-LO Serial 42-12596)

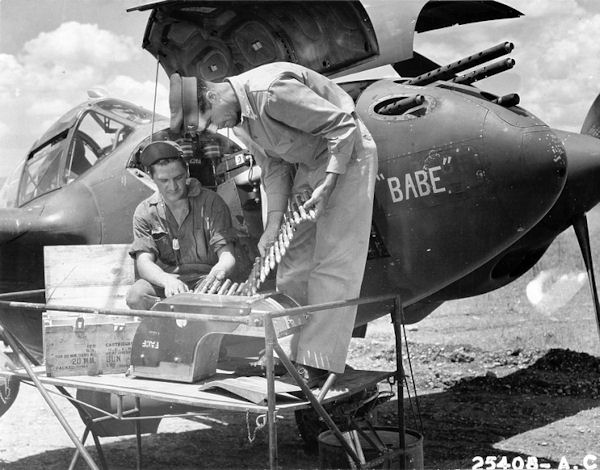
14th Fighter Group P-38 being serviced in North Africa, 1943

The 14th Pursuit Group was activated on 15 January 1941 at Hamilton Field, California. It moved to March Field in California in early June 1941. The group trained with Curtiss P-40 Warhawks, Republic P-43 Lancers and Lockheed P-38D/E Lightnings. It returned to Hamilton Field on 7 February 1942 to receive operational P-38Fs and flew patrols on the west coast of the US after the Japanese attack on Pearl Harbor. Although these fighters were not yet combat ready, P-38 outfits had the only truly modern fighters then available to the Army Air Forces (AAF), and provided West Coast defense at a time that Japanese attacks on the US mainland were believed to be imminent.

Even though the defense of the US west coast initially took priority, plans were made in the spring of 1942 to deploy the 14th and other P-38 groups to Great Britain. The group was redesignated as the 14th Fighter Group in May 1942. The ground echelon departed 16 July 1942 on the first stage of the movement to England. They sailed on the USS West Point in early August 1942, and arrived in Liverpool on 17 August 1942. The air echelon departed for Bradley Field, Connecticut on 1 July 1942. It flew its P-38s to the United Kingdom via the northern ferry route. The first aircraft departed Presque Isle Army Air Field, Maine on 22 July 1942. The 50th Fighter Squadron remained in Iceland and was reassigned to the 342d Composite Group to assist the Curtiss P-40Cs of the 33d Fighter Squadron in the flying of defensive patrols over the Atlantic. This was the first transatlantic crossing successfully made by single-seat fighters. In Britain, the group was stationed at RAF Atcham as part of Eighth Air Force.

The 14th was reassigned to the XII Fighter Command of Twelfth Air Force on 14 September 1942, but continued to operate under VIII Fighter Command until mid-October flying sweeps over France and performing practice missions under the Royal Air Force's guidance. The Ground echelon left Atcham on 30 October 1942, and sailed on the USS Brazil and USS Uruguay from Liverpool and arrived in Oran, Algeria on 10 November 1942. The air echelon departed for North Africa on 6 November 1942, and flew to Tafaraoui Airfield, Algeria from 10 to 14 November 1942.

From bases in Algeria, and later Tunisia, the group flew escort, strafing, and reconnaissance missions from the middle of November 1942 to late in January 1943. In November, Lt. Carl T. Williams scored the first United States victory in the western desert over a German aircraft and Lt. Virgil Smith became the first American ace in the theater. The Lightnings were soon in regular combat in the North African Campaign. The 14th contributed a great deal toward the establishment of local air superiority in the area, being effective against bombers and had wreaked great havoc among Rommel's air transport well out to sea. The P-38s earned the German nickname "der Gabelschwanz Teufel"—the Fork-Tailed Devil. In January 1943, the 14th was withdrawn from combat, with some of the men and planes being reassigned to the 1st and 82d Fighter Groups.

The group resumed combat operations in May, being re-equipped with the P-38F and some P-38Gs. Already prior to the Axis defeat in Tunisia, the Northwest African Air Forces (of which the Twelfth Air Force was a component) had begun preparations for the invasion of Sicily. Attacks on Sicily, on Pantelleria and on Lampedusa were stepped up in preparation for Operation Husky, the invasion of Sicily on 10 July 1943. The group flew dive-bombing missions during the Allied assault on Pantelleria. It helped prepare for and support the invasions of Sicily and Italy.

In a combined operation code named "Nostril" elements of 14th and 1st FighterGroup provided cover for a British Naval group in the Aegean Sea in the Doceconese Islands Group on 7–9 October 43. On 9 Oct, the 37th Squadron of the 14th Fighter Group led by Maj William L. Leverette intercepted a squadron of 27 Ju 87s over the British Naval group. In the ensuing engagement this squadron claimed 16 downed Junkers Ju 87s and one Ju 88 : Maj Leverette – 7 (a record for the most victories in one sortie in the MTOI); Lt H. T. Hanna – 5 (becoming an ace in one day); Lt Homer L Sprinkle – 3; Lt Robert Margison – 1; and Lt Wayne L Blue – 1 Ju 88.

The 14th was reassigned to Fifteenth Air Force in November 1943, and moved to Triolo Airfield, Italy. It engaged primarily in escort work flying many missions to cover bombers engaged in long-range operations against strategic objectives in Italy, France, Germany, Czechoslovakia, Austria, Hungary, Yugoslavia, Romania, and Bulgaria. However, on occasion, the group escorted the medium bombers of the Twelfth Air Force. On 2 April 1944, the 14th Fighter Group earned a Distinguished Unit Citation for beating off attacks by enemy fighters while escorting bombers attacking ball-bearing and aircraft production facilities at Steyr, Austria, enabling the bombers to strike their targets.

In late July and early August 1944, the 14th flew shuttle missions to Russia and returned to their Italian base after spending three days at a Soviet base in Ukraine. Along with their P-51 escorts, they shot down thirty German planes and destroyed twelve on the ground. The last Lightning shuttle mission was flown on 4/6 August.

The group provided escort for reconnaissance operations, supported the invasion of Southern France in August 1944, and on numerous occasions flew long-range missions to strafe and dive-bomb motor vehicles, trains, bridges, supply areas, airdromes, and troop concentrations in an area extending from France to the Balkans. The 14th Fighter Group was inactivated in Italy on 9 September 1945.

Aerial Victories	Number	Note
Group Hq	16
37th Fighter Squadron	49.5
48th Fighter Squadron	153
49th Fighter Squadron	103.5
Group Total	315.83

=== Cold War ===
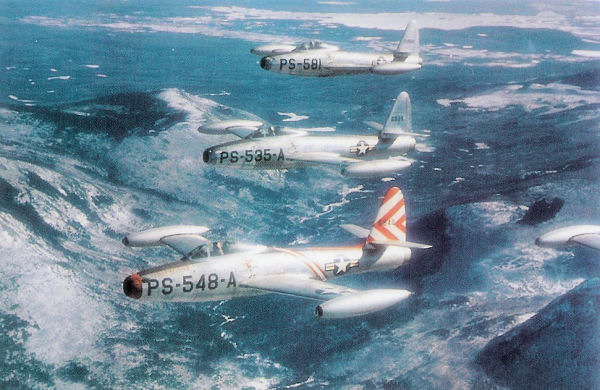
49th Fighter Squadron F-84B Thunderjets in formation, March 1948.

The Group was once more activated in the US on 20 November 1946 at Dow Field, Maine as part of the First Air Force of Air Defense Command (ADC). Its assigned squadrons were 37th, 48th and 49th Fighter Squadrons. The 14th Fighter Group was one of the first AAF groups assigned to ADC.

The group was initially equipped with surplus Republic P-47N Thunderbolts and was responsible for air defense of the Northeastern United States. In 1947 became the first unit to be equipped with the Republic P-84B Thunderjets. However, deficiencies discovered during testing of the Thunderjets required restrictions on the new jets that limited their operational use. These restrictions were made more acute by maintenance difficulties and lack of trained maintenance personnel.

In July 1947 the group deployed to Muroc Air Force Base, California to conduct accelerated service tests with new F-84Bs prior to acceptance. The first operational production USAF F-84Bs arrived at Dow on 7 November; the last F-84B was delivered in February 1948. Throughout the winter of 1947/48 the 14th Fighter Group lost three F-84s at Dow. Findings indicated that the extreme cold weather at the base enhanced aircraft performance over what was found during testing in California, however as the temperatures moderated in the spring of 1948, accident rate remained high. In May 1948, the group's entire fleet was grounded until inspections could be performed on each aircraft, but the earlier restrictions still applied when the planes returned to service.

With the F-84s, the 14th's mission was daylight and fair weather defense of northeast United States from New York City north to Maine/New Brunswick border, shared with the 52d Fighter Group (All-Weather) at Mitchel Air Force Base, New York which flew F-82 Twin Mustangs for night and inclement weather operations.

In August 1947, the Air Force began a service test of the Wing-Base organization. As a result, the group was assigned to the 14th Fighter Wing, along with three newly created support groups. This reorganization was intended to unify control at air bases, This test proved the wing-base plan to the satisfaction of the Air Force.

In July 1949, the group sent sixteen F-84Bs to New York City for a flyover display at newly opened Idlewild Airport. President Truman's reduced 1949 defense budget required reductions in the number of groups in the Air Force to 48, and the group was inactivated on 2 October 1949, Its F-84B aircraft were returned to Republic Aircraft for refurbishment and reassignment to Air National Guard units.

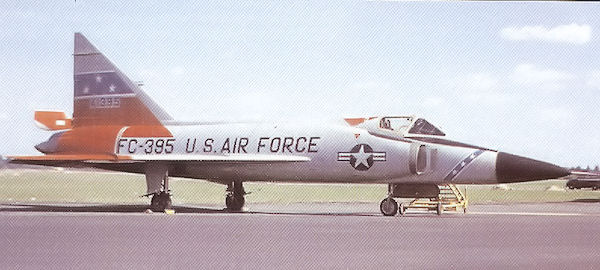
14th Fighter Group F-102A Delta Dagger, 1959

The group was redesignated as the 14th Fighter Group (Air Defense) and reactivated on 18 August 1955 at Ethan Allen Air Force Base, Vermont to replace the 517th Air Defense Group, whose mission, equipment, and personnel were transferred to the 14th as part of ADC's Project Arrow, which was designed to bring back on the active list the fighter units that had compiled memorable records in the two world wars. Its operational component was the 37th Fighter-Interceptor Squadron (FIS), which was already stationed at Ethan Allen. It was initially assigned to Air Defense Command (ADC)'s 4711th Defense Wing and equipped with airborne intercept radar equipped and Mighty Mouse rocket armed North American F-86D Sabre interceptor aircraft. It also acted as the host organization for USAF units at Ethan Allen and was assigned several support units to fulfill that duty. It was reassigned to the 32d Air Division (Defense), 1 March 1956. Its 37th FIS upgraded in December 1957 to the F-102 Delta Dagger interceptor until being inactivated on 1 May 1960. The group wound up active USAF operations at Ethan Allen and inactivated along with its support organizations the following month.

=== Modern era ===
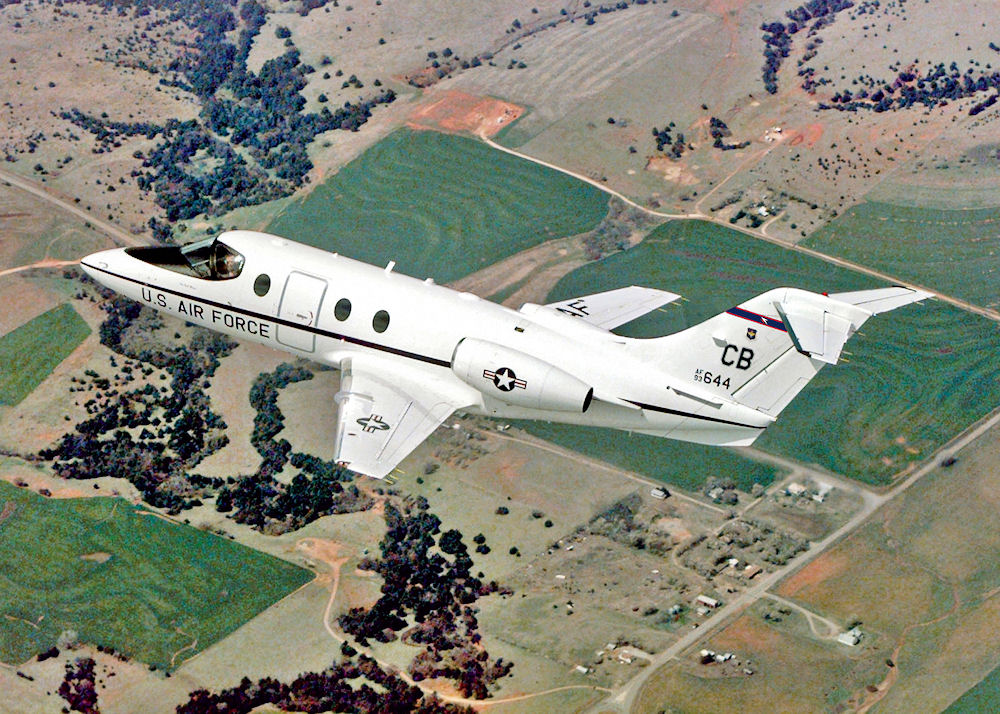
Group Beechcraft T-1A Jayhawk (Note: Serial No. 93-644)

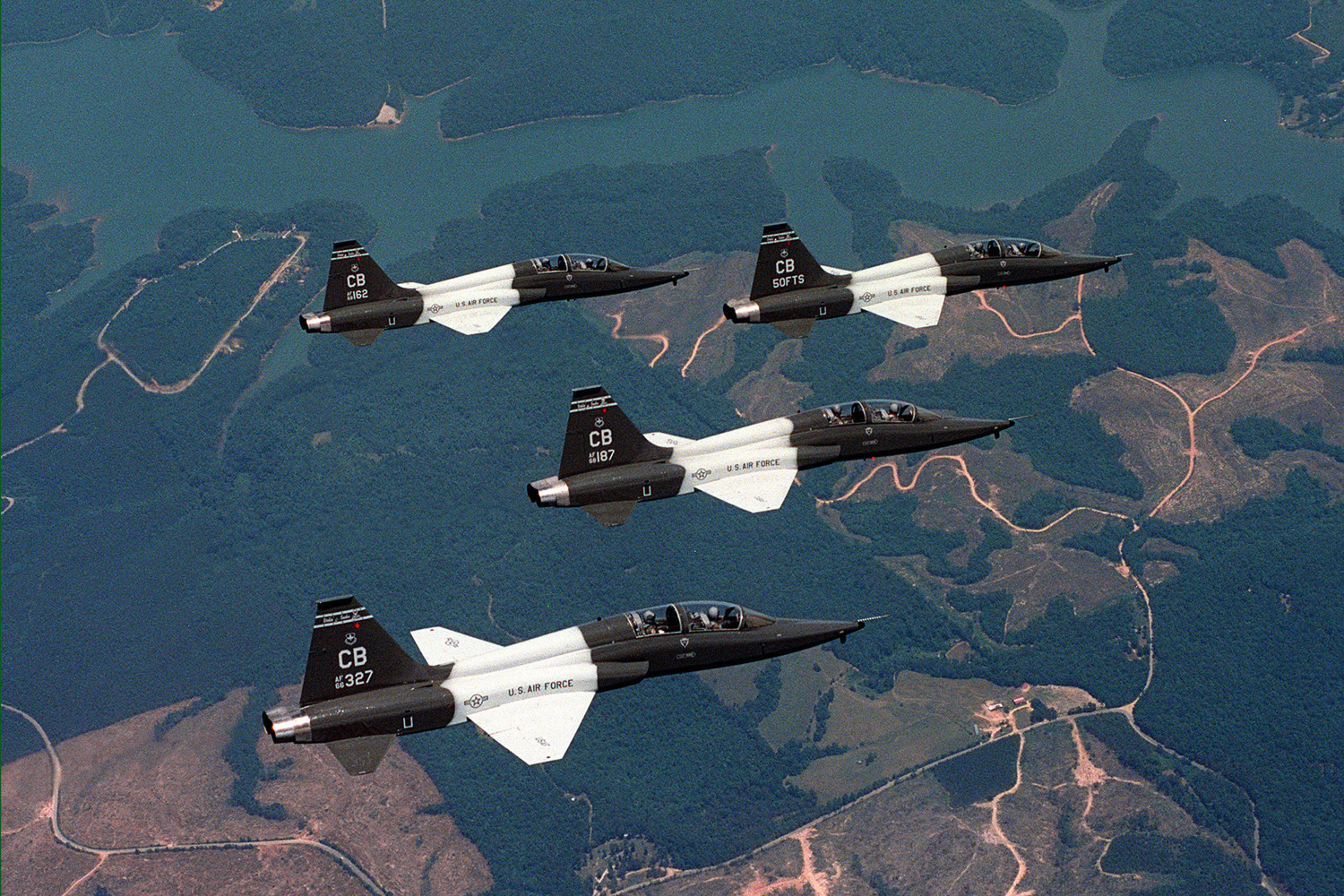
Northrop T-38C formation (Note: Aircraft are from the 50th Flying Training Squadron. 66-4327, 68–8162 and 68-8187 are identifiable)

While inactive, the group was redesignated as the 14th Tactical Fighter Group, but was redesignated as the 14th Operations Group (OG) in December 1991 and activated as a result of the 14th Flying Training Wing (FTW) implementing the USAF Objective Wing reorganization.

Upon activation, the 14th OG was assigned the flying and operational support components of the 14th FTW.

From its activation, the group trained USAF and allied pilots in basic flying skills and from 1993 to 2005 in fighter fundamentals, using AT-38 aircraft. In 1993, Captains Kathy McDonald and Ellen McKinnon became the first women at Columbus Air Force Base to complete the fighter fundamentals course. On 27 January 1995, Second Lieutenant Kelly Flinn graduated from pilot training with the 14th Operations Group on her way to becoming the first woman to enter B-52 Stratofortress combat crew training. Fighter fundamentals training at Columbus resumed on 10 May 2007 with the reassignment of the 49th Fighter Training Squadron from Moody Air Force Base, Georgia.

Colonel Stan Lawrie took command of the group in July 2016. Today the group's six squadrons are responsible for the 52-week Specialized Undergraduate Pilot Training (SUPT) mission at Columbus Air Force Base for the U.S. Air Force and international officers. The group uses a fleet of Beechcraft T-6 Texan II, Northrop T-38 Talon, and Raytheon T-1 Jayhawk aircraft and flight simulators. Its 250 aircraft fly about 90,000 hours annually in 11,500 square miles (30,000 km^{2}) of airspace.

== Lineage ==
- Constituted as 14th Pursuit Group (Fighter) on 20 November 1940

Activated on 15 January 1941
Redesignated 14th Fighter Group (Twin Engine) on 15 May 1942
Redesignated 14th Fighter Group, Two Engine on 28 February 1944
Inactivated on 9 September 1945

- Redesignated 14th Fighter Group, Single Engine

Activated on 20 November 1946
Redesignated 14th Fighter Group, Jet ca 24 May 1948
Inactivated on 2 October 1949

- Redesignated 14th Fighter Group (Air Defense) on 20 June 1955

Activated on 18 August 1955,
Discontinued and inactivated on 25 June 1960

- Redesignated: 14th Tactical Fighter Group on 31 July 1985 (unit remained inactive)
- Redesignated: 14th Operations Group on 9 December 1991

Activated on 15 December 1991

=== Assignments ===
- 10th Pursuit Wing, 15 January 1941
- 9 Pursuit Wing, 1 June 1941
- IV Bomber Command, 5 September 1941 (Attached to IV Interceptor Command), 17 October–December 1941
- IV Interceptor Command(later, IV Fighter Command), 26 January 1942
- 6th Fighter Wing, 14 August 1942
- XII Fighter Command, 14 September 1942
- XII Bomber Command, 11 December 1942
- 7th Fighter Wing, January 1943
- Northwest African Training Command, February 1943
- 5th Bombardment Wing, May 1943
- Northwest African Tactical Air Force, 10 July 1943
- 5th Bombardment Wing, 14 July 1943
- 2686 Medium Bombardment Wing (Provisional), 25 July 1943
- 5th Bombardment Wing, September 1943
- 306th Fighter Wing, 27 March 1944
- 305th Fighter Wing (Provisional), 3 September 1944
- 305th Bombardment Wing, Heavy, 12 June 1945
- Fifteenth Air Force, 9 September 1945
- First Air Force, 20 November 1946
- 14th Fighter Wing, 15 August 1947 – 2 October 1949
- 4711th Air Defense Wing, 18 August 1955
- 32d Air Division (Defense), 1 March 1956
- Bangor Air Defense Sector, 1 August 1958 – 25 June 1960
- 14th Flying Training Wing, 15 December 1991 – present

=== Components ===
Operational Squadrons

- 37th Fighter Squadron (later 37th Fighter-Interceptor Squadron; 37th Flying Training Squadron): 1 March 1943 – 9 September 1945; 20 November 1946 – 2 October 1949; 18 August 1955 – 1 May 1960; 15 December 1991 – present
- 41st Flying Training Squadron: 1 October 1998 – present
- 43d Flying Training Squadron: 15 December 1991 – 1 October 1992
- 48th Pursuit Squadron (later 48th Fighter Squadron; 48th Flying Training Squadron): 15 January 1941 – 9 September 1945; 20 November 1946 – 2 October 1949; 1 July 1996 – present
- 49th Pursuit Squadron (later, 49th Fighter Squadron; 49th Flying Training Squadron; 49th Fighter Training Squadron): 15 January 1941 – 9 September 1945; 20 November 1946 – 2 October 1949; 15 December 1991 – 18 September 1992; 1 July 1993 – 10 October 2000; 10 May 2007 – present
- 50th Pursuit Squadron (later, 50th Fighter Squadron; 50th Flying Training Squadron): 15 January 1941 – 14 November 1942; 15 December 1991 – 2 July 2025

Support Units

- 14th USAF Infirmary (later USAF Dispensary), 18 August 1955 – 25 June 1960
- 14th Air Base Squadron, 18 August 1955 – 25 June 1960
- 14th Consolidated Aircraft Maintenance Squadron, 8 July 1957 – 25 June 1960
- 14th Materiel Squadron, 18 August 1955 – 25 June 1960
- 14th Operations Support Squadron, 15 December 1991 – present

=== Stations ===
- Hamilton Field, California, 15 January 1941
- March Field, California, c. 10 June 1941
- Hamilton Field, California, 7 February – 16 July 1942
- RAF Atcham (USAAF Station 342), England, 18 August–November 1942
- Tafaraoui Airfield, Algeria, 15 November 1942
- Maison Blanche Airport, Algiers, Algeria, 18 November 1942
- Youks-les-Bains Airfield, Algeria, 22 November 1942
- Berteaux Airfield, Algeria, 9 January 1943
- Mediouna Airfield, French Morocco, 5 March 1943
- Telergma Airfield, Algeria, 5 May 1943
- El Bathan Airfield, Tunisia, 3 June 1943
- Sainte Marie du Zit Airfield, Tunisia, 25 July 1943
- Triolo Airfield, Italy, 12 December 1943
- Lesina Airfield, Italy, September 1945 – 9 September 1945
- Dow Air Force Base, Maine, 20 November 1946 – 2 October 1949
- Ethan Allen Air Force Base, Vermont, 18 August 1955 – 25 June 1960
- Columbus Air Force Base, Mississippi, 15 December 1991 – present

=== Awards and campaigns ===
Award streamer	Award	Dates	Notes
	Distinguished Unit Citation	2 April 1944	14th Fighter Group, Austria
	Air Force Outstanding Unit Award	1 July 1992-30 June 1994	14th Operations Group
	Air Force Outstanding Unit Award	1 July 1999-30 June 2001	14th Operations Group
	Air Force Outstanding Unit Award	1 July 2001–30 June 2002	14th Operations Group
	Air Force Outstanding Unit Award	1 July 2002–30 June 2004	14th Operations Group
	Air Force Outstanding Unit Award	1 July 2004–30 June 2006	14th Operations Group
	Air Force Outstanding Unit Award	1 July 2006–30 June 2007	14th Operations Group
	Air Force Outstanding Unit Award	1 July 2007–30 June 2009	14th Operations Group
	Air Force Outstanding Unit Award	1 July 2009–30 June 2010	14th Operations Group
	Air Force Outstanding Unit Award	1 July 2010–30 June 2011	14th Operations Group

Campaign Streamer	Campaign	Dates	Notes
	Air Combat, EAME Theater	18 August 1942 – 11 May 1945	14th Fighter Group
	Air Offensive, Europe	18 August 1942 – 5 June 1944	14th Fighter Group
	Tunisia	12 November 1942 – 13 May 1943	14th Fighter Group
	Sicily	14 May 1943 – 17 August 1943	14th Fighter Group
	Naples-Foggia	18 August 1943 – 21 January 1944	14th Fighter Group
	Rome-Arno	22 January 1944 – 9 September 1944	14th Fighter Group
	Northern France	25 July 1944 – 14 September 1944	14th Fighter Group
	Southern France	15 August 1944 – 14 September 1944	14th Fighter Group
	North Apennines	10 September 1944 – 4 April 1945	14th Fighter Group
	Rhineland	15 September 1944 – 21 March 1945	14th Fighter Group
	Central Europe	22 March 1944 – 21 May 1945	14th Fighter Group
	Po Valley	3 April 1945 – 8 May 1945	14th Fighter Group

=== Aircraft ===
- Curtiss P-40 Warhawk (1941)
- Seversky P-43 Lancer (1941)
- P-66 Vanguard (1941)
- Lockheed P-38 Lightning (1941–1945)
- Republic P-47 Thunderbolt (1946–1949)
- Republic F-84 Thunderjet (1947–1949)
- North American F-86D Sabre (1955–1958)
- Convair F-102A Delta Dagger (1958–1960)
- Convair TF-102B Delta Dagger (1958–1960)
- Cessna T-37 Tweet (1991–2008)
- Northrop T-38 Talon (1991–present)
- Northrop AT-38 Talon (1991–2000 and 2007–present)
- T-1 Jayhawk (1996–present)
- T-6 Texan II (2006–present)
- A-29 Super Tucano (Unknown)

== See also ==
- 529th Air Service Group Support organization for group at Dow Air Force Base prior to implementation of Wing-Base organization
- List of United States Air Force Groups
- List of United States Air Force Aerospace Defense Command Interceptor Squadrons
- List of Lockheed P-38 Lightning operators
- List of F-86 Sabre units
