= 49th Fighter Training Squadron =

49th Flying Training Squadron
- Active: 1941–1945; 1946–1949; 1952–1987; 1990–1992; 1993 – present
- Country: United States
- Branch: United States Air Force
- Role: Pilot Training
- Size: 31 officers and enlisted
- Part of: Air Education and Training Command; 14th Flying Training Wing; 14th Operations Group
- Garrison/HQ: Columbus Air Force Base, Mississippi
- Nickname: Black Knights
- Engagements: European Theater of Operations Mediterranean Theater of Operations
- Decorations: Distinguished Unit Citation; Air Force Outstanding Unit Award

Commanders
- Current commander: Lt. Col. Richard "Dozer" Martin

Insignia
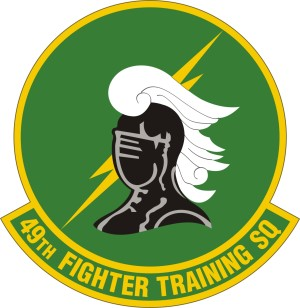
- 49th Fighter Training Squadron emblem (approved 28 February 1995)

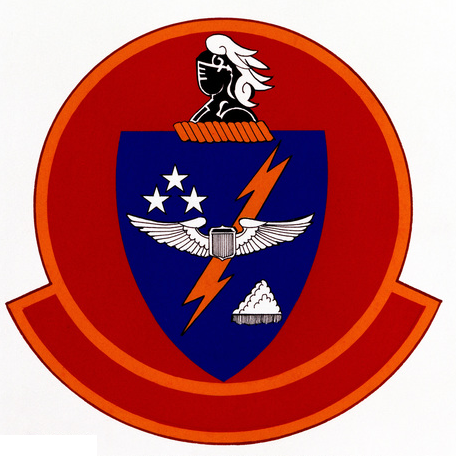
- 49th Flying Training Squadron emblem (approved 23 May 1990)

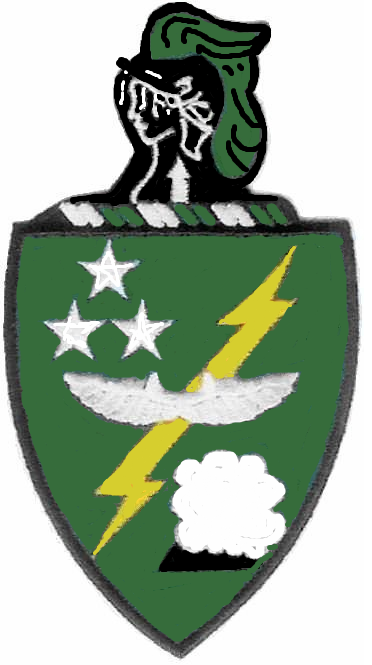
- 49th Fighter-Interceptor Squadron emblem (approved 23 July 1954)

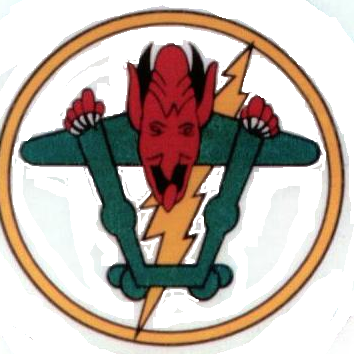
- 49th Fighter Squadron emblem (World War II)

The 49th Flying Training Squadron is part of the 14th Flying Training Wing based at Columbus Air Force Base, Mississippi. It operates T-38 Talon aircraft conducting flight training. It was designated the 49th Fighter Training Squadron until 2 July 2025.

The squadron was first activated as the 49th Pursuit Squadron in 1941 during the expansion of the United States military that preceded World War II. Immediately after the attack on Pearl Harbor, the squadron flew air defense patrols off the southern Pacific coast. In 1942 it was redesignated the 49th Fighter Squadron and deployed to England, but a few months later the squadron moved to the Mediterranean Theater of Operations. The squadron earned a Distinguished Unit Citation in 1944 and was inactivated in 1945.

The squadron was activated again at Dow Field, Maine as one of the first units of Air Defense Command (ADC). It converted to Republic F-84 Thunderjets, being one of the first squadrons to do so. The squadron was inactivated in 1949.

In 1952 the squadron, now designated the 49th Fighter-Interceptor Squadron, was activated to replace an Air National Guard squadron that was being released from active duty at Dow. For the next thirty-five years the unit carried out the air defense mission at Dow, Hanscom Field, and Griffiss Air Force Base, upgrading its aircraft until equipping with the Convair F-106 Delta Dart, which it flew for almost twenty years. The squadron was the last to fly that plane, inactivating in 1987 as the Air National Guard took over air defense mission.

The unit was reactivated in 1990 as the 49th Flying Training Squadron at Columbus Air Force Base. Mississippi. It conducted the advanced phase of undergraduate pilot training and basic procedures and techniques of fighter employment since then except for a brief period when it was inactive in 1992–1993. In 2003 its name was changed to 49th Fighter Training Squadron to reflect this mission.

== Mission ==
The 49th Fighter Training Squadron conducts Fighter/Bomber Fundamentals flying training for Air Force and international pilots and weapon systems officers. It flies over 2,400 hours annually. Its mission is to develop the ability, proficiency, confidence, discipline, judgment, situational awareness and airmanship of future fighter wingmen.

In addition, unit members deploy to support fighter syllabus and operational training requirements for close air support and dissimilar air combat training.

== History ==
=== World War II ===
The squadron was first activated in early 1941 at Hamilton Field, California as the 49th Pursuit Squadron one of the original three squadrons of the 14th Pursuit Group. The squadron trained with Republic P-43 Lancers until it was equipped with early model Lockheed P-38 Lightnings. After the Pearl Harbor Attack the squadron deployed to San Diego Municipal Airport where it flew air defense patrols for a week before returning to March Field later in the month.

In August 1942 the squadron deployed to the European Theater of Operations and flew escort missions for Boeing B-17 Flying Fortress and Consolidated B-24 Liberator heavy bombers as part of VIII Fighter Command until November.

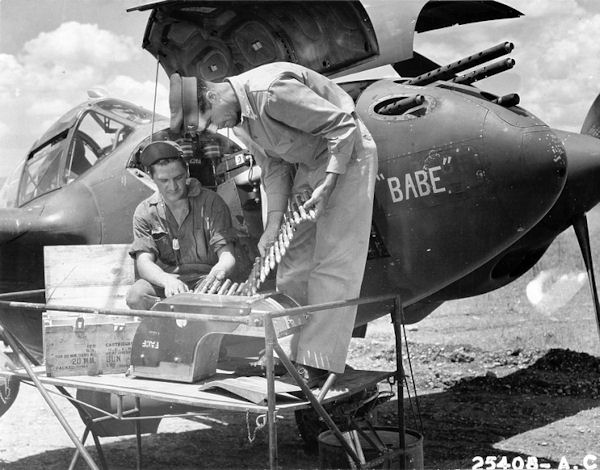
14th Fighter Group P-38 being serviced in North Africa

The 49th was sent to North Africa in late 1942 as part of the Operation Torch invasion forces, taking up station in Algeria. The unit was reassigned to Twelfth Air Force and flew both fighter escort missions for the B-17s operating from Algeria, as well as tactical interdiction strikes on enemy targets of opportunity in Algeria and Tunisia during the North African Campaign. The 49th flew strafing and reconnaissance missions until January 1943, when the unit was withdrawn from combat and some aircraft and personnel were assigned to other units. In May, it resumed operations.

Following the German defeat and withdrawal from North Africa the squadron flew dive bombing attacks during the assault on Pantelleria. It helped prepare for and support Operation Husky, the Allied invasion of Sicily, and Operation Avalanche, the invasion of Italy. It engaged primarily in escort operations after November 1943, flying missions to cover bombers on long-range missions attacking strategic objectives in Italy, France, Germany, Czechoslovakia, Austria, Hungary, Yugoslavia, Rumania and Bulgaria. The squadron received a Distinguished Unit Citation for its actions on 2 April 1944 when it beat off attacks by enemy fighter aircraft, enabling the bombers it covered to strike a ball-bearing factory in Austria.

The squadron also provided support for reconnaissance operations. It deployed to Corsica in August 1944 to support Allied Forces in Operation Dragoon, the invasion of Southern France. The unit continued to fly long range missions to strafe and dive bomb targets in an arc from France to the Balkan Peninsula until the surrender of Germany in May 1945. The squadron was inactivated in Italy in September of that year.

=== Cold War air defense ===
==== Early operations ====
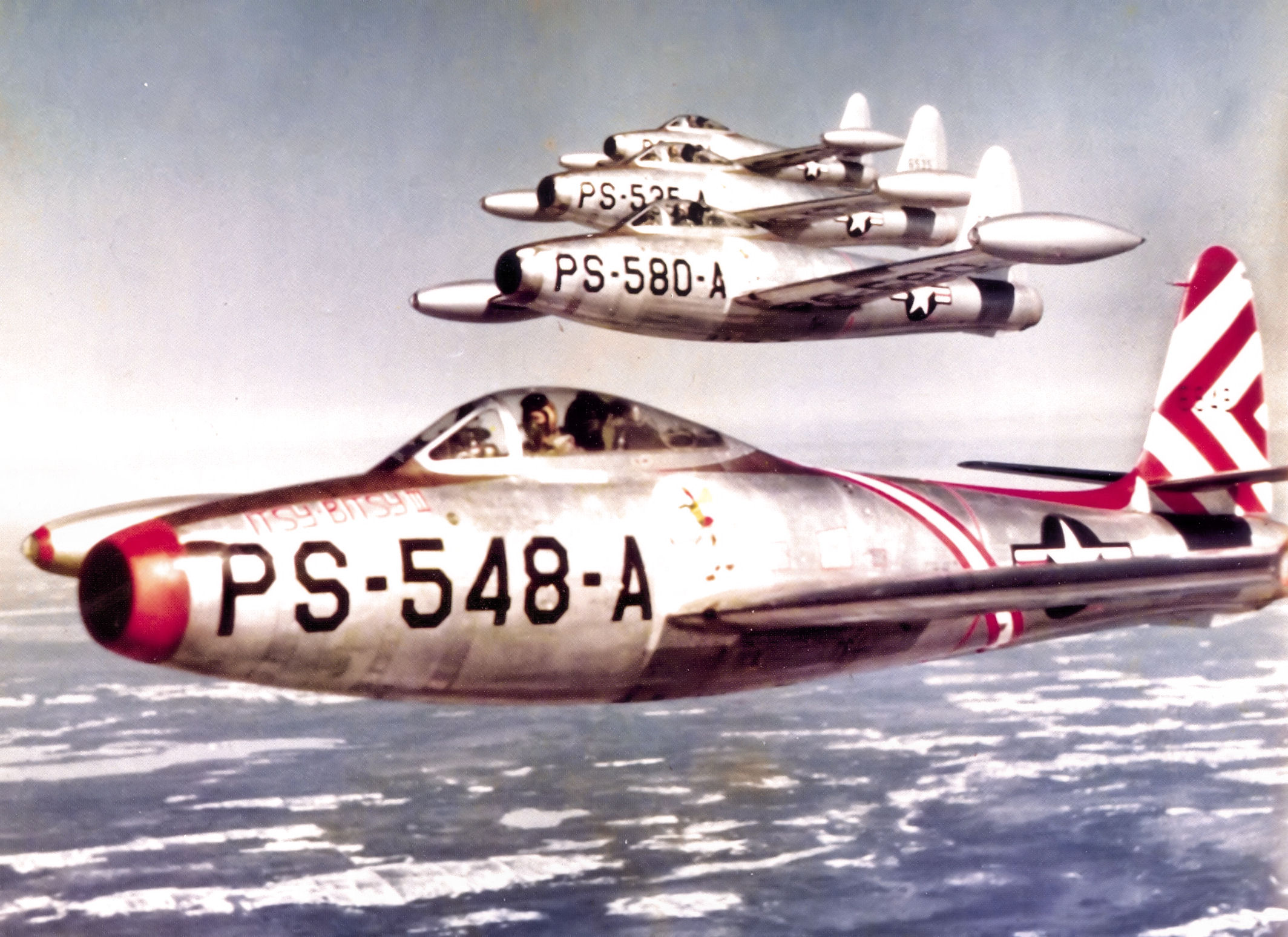
F-84B Thunderjets of the 49th Fighter Squadron in formation over Maine, 1948

The squadron was once more activated in the US on 20 November 1946 at Dow Field, Maine as part of the First Air Force of Air Defense Command (ADC). The squadron was one of the first operational units assigned to ADC.

The 49th was initially equipped with Republic P-47N Thunderbolts and later with first generation P-84B Thunderjets. It was responsible for air defense of the Northeastern United States. In 1947, the units's parent group became the first in the AAF to equip with the P-84.

The 37th's mission was daylight and fair weather defense of northeast United States from New York City north to the Maine/New Brunswick border, shared with 52d Fighter Group (All-Weather) at Mitchel Air Force Base, New York which flew North American F-82 Twin Mustangs for night and inclement weather operations. The squadron was inactivated on 2 October 1949.

==== Air defense of the northeast ====
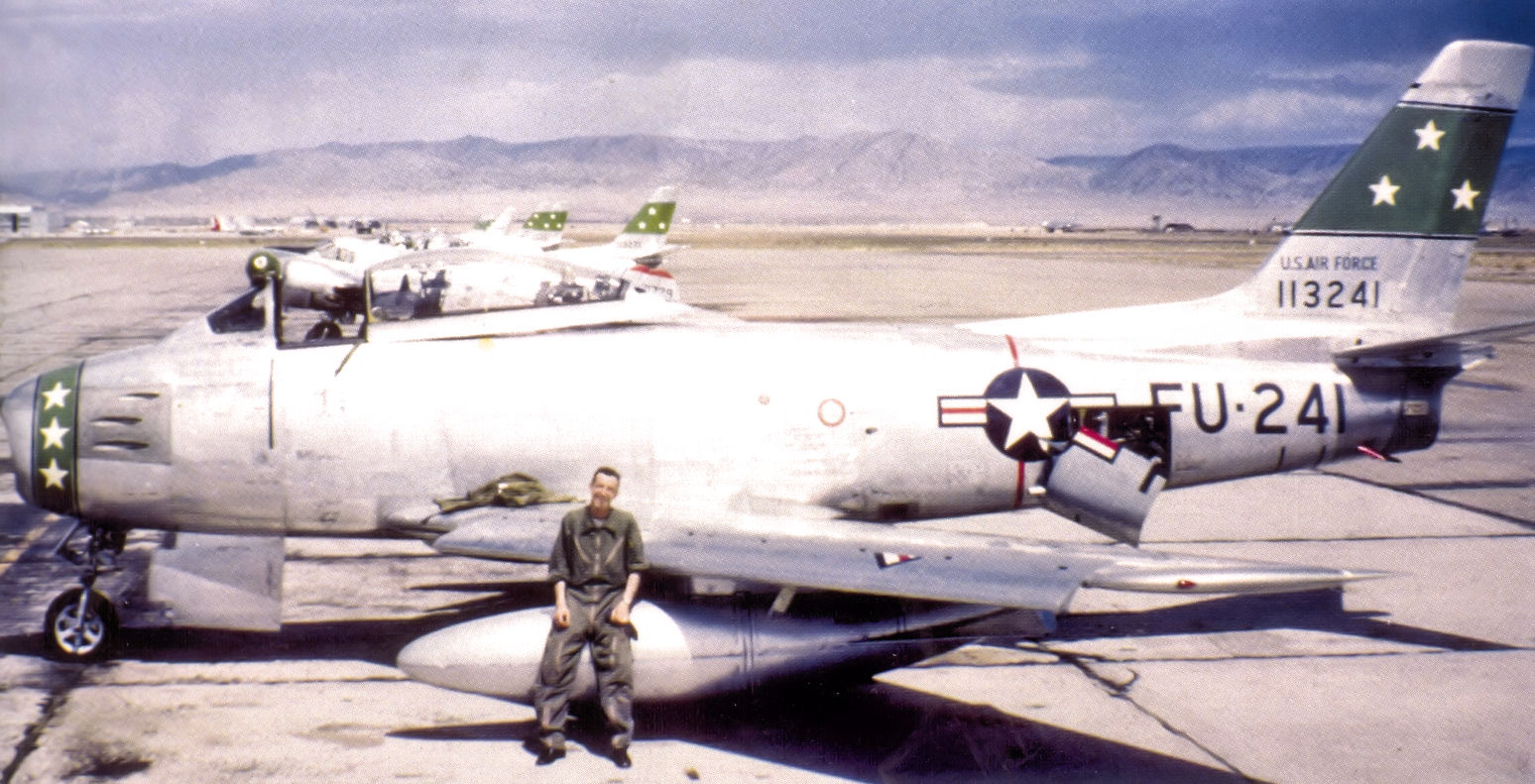
North American F-86F-25-NH Sabre 51-13241 circa 1953

The squadron was redesignated the 49th Fighter-Interceptor Squadron and reactivated on 1 November 1952 and was once again stationed at Dow Air Force Base, where it was assigned to the 4711th Defense Wing. At Dow the squadron assumed the mission, personnel, and Lockheed F-80C Shooting Stars of the 132d Fighter-Interceptor Squadron, which was simultaneously inactivated. The 132d was a Maine Air National Guard unit that had been mobilized in February 1951 for the Korean War. Upon inactivation the 132d was returned to the control of the Guard.

Five months after activation, the squadron upgraded to North American F-86F Sabre aircraft. Both the F-80C and F-86F were day interceptor aircraft, but the F-86 was faster and more agile. In March 1954, however the squadron converted to Mighty Mouse rocket armed and airborne intercept radar equipped F-86D Sabres, giving it an all weather capability. In November 1955, the squadron and its F-86Ds moved to Hanscom Field near Boston where it was reassigned to the 4707th Air Defense Wing.

In October 1956 the squadron re-equipped with its third version of the F-86, the F-86L. The F-86L incorporated data link, which enabled it to communicate directly with Semi Automatic Ground Environment direction centers without the need for voice communications. The unit operated the F-86L for the remainder of its tenure at Hanscom.

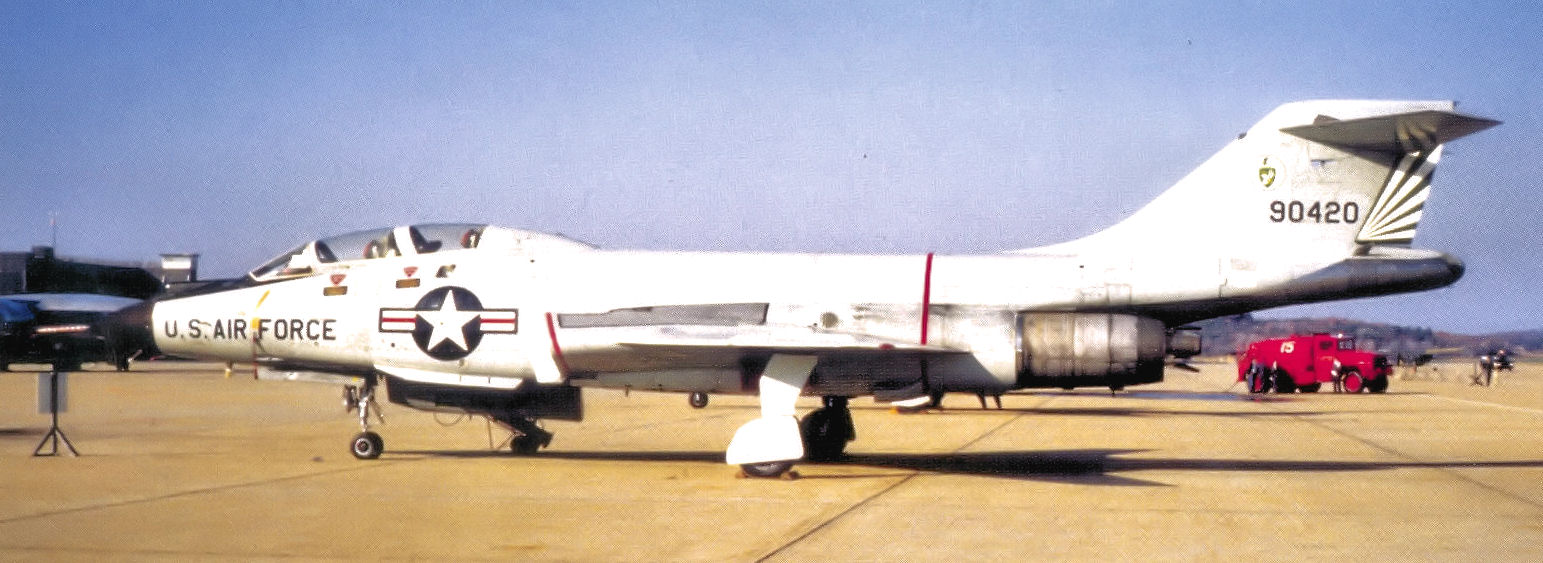
49th FIS McDonnell F-101B Voodoo 59-0420 at Griffiss Air Force Base, New York 1966

In October 1959 the 49th and the 465th Fighter-Interceptor Squadron at Griffiss Air Force Base, New York traded places, with each squadron assuming the mission, aircraft and personnel of the other. At Griffiss, the 49th joined the 27th Fighter-Interceptor Squadron in the 4727th Air Defense Group until October, when the 27th moved and there was no longer a need for a group headquarters for ADC fighter squadrons so the 4727th was discontinued. The 49th initially operated Northrop F-89J Scorpions, which were armed with the AIR-2 Genie, a nuclear capable Air-to-air rocket. However, by December 1959 the squadron had begun to upgrade to supersonic McDonnell F-101B Voodoos, and the F-101F operational and conversion trainer. The two-seat trainer version was equipped with dual controls, but carried the same AIR-2 armament as the F-101B and was combat capable.

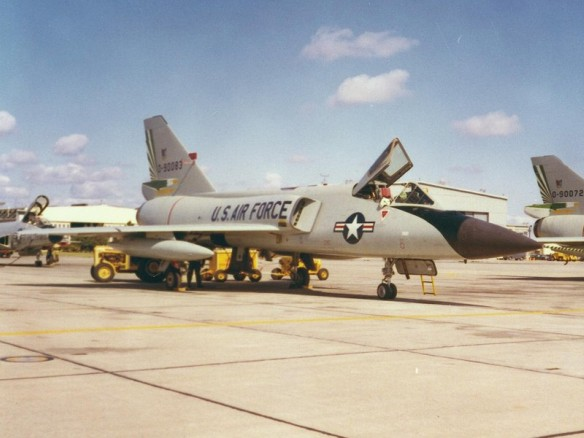
49th FIS F-106A in 1970.

The squadron operated Voodoos until September 1968, the aircraft being passed along to the Air National Guard as the squadron re-equipped with Convair F-106 Delta Darts. There were a total of forty-six F-106's assigned to the 49th at Griffiss between 30 September 1968 until its inactivation on 30 September 1987. F-106s 59-0062 and 59-0136 were the last two Delta Darts in active-duty USAF service, being sent to the Aerospace Maintenance and Regeneration Center at Davis–Monthan Air Force Base, Arizona on 9 July 1987.

The squadron was initially programmed to receive F-15 Eagles to be used in the interceptor mission, however it was decided to inactivate the unit as part of the transfer of the air defense mission in the United States to the Air National Guard. The 49th Fighter Interceptor Squadron was the last active USAF F-106 unit.

=== Pilot training ===
The unit was reactivated in 1990 as the 49th Flying Training Squadron at Columbus Air Force Base. Mississippi. It conducted the advanced phase of undergraduate pilot training for two years before inactivating two years later.

It was activated again in 1994 and since then has taught basic procedures and techniques of fighter employment. It moved to Moody Air Force Base, Georgia in 2000, but returned to Columbus in 2007. In 2003 its name was changed to 49th Fighter Training Squadron to reflect this mission.

== Lineage ==
- Constituted as the 49th Pursuit Squadron (Fighter) on 20 November 1940

Activated on 15 January 1941
Redesignated 49th Fighter Squadron (Twin Engine) on 15 May 1942
Redesignated 49th Fighter Squadron, Two Engine on 28 February 1944
Inactivated on 9 September 1945

- Redesignated 49th Fighter Squadron, Jet Propelled and activated, on 20 November 1946

Redesignated 49th Fighter Squadron, Jet on 26 July 1948
Inactivated on 2 October 1949

- Redesignated 49th Fighter-Interceptor Squadron on 11 September 1952

Activated on 1 November 1952
Inactivated on 7 July 1987

- Redesignated 49th Flying Training Squadron on 11 May 1990

Activated on 25 June 1990
Inactivated on 18 September 1992

- Activated on 1 July 1993

Redesignated: 49th Fighter Training Squadron on 19 May 2003
Redesignated: 49th Flying Training Squadron on 2 July 2025

=== Assignments ===
- 14th Pursuit Group (later 14th Fighter Group): 15 January 1941 – 9 September 1945
- 14th Fighter Group: 20 November 1946 – 2 October 1949
- 4711th Defense Wing (later 4711th Air Defense Wing): 1 November 1952
- 4707th Air Defense Wing: 5 November 1955
- 32d Air Division: 16 January 1956
- Boston Air Defense Sector: 1 August 1958
- 4727th Air Defense Group: 1 July 1959
- Syracuse Air Defense Sector: 15 October 1959
- Boston Air Defense Sector: 4 September 1963
- 35th Air Division: 1 April 1966
- 21st Air Division: 19 November 1969
- 24th Air Division: 23 September 1983 – 7 July 1987
- 14th Flying Training Wing 25 June 1990
- 14th Operations Group, 15 December 1991 – 18 September 1992
- 14th Operations Group, 1 July 1993
- 479th Flying Training Group: 10 October 2000
- 14th Flying Training Wing: 10 May 2007 – present

=== Stations ===
- Hamilton Field, California, 15 January 1941
- March Field, California, 10 June 1941 (operated From: San Diego, California 7–12 December 1941)
- Hamilton Field, California, 9 May 1942 – 16 July 1942
- RAF Atcham (Station 342), England, 18 August 1942 – 28 October 1942
- Tafaraoui Airfield, Algeria, 15 November 1942
- Youks-les-Bains Airfield, Algeria, 22 November 1942
- Berteaux Airfield, Algeria, 9 January 1943
- Mediouna Airfield, French Morocco, 5 March 1943
- Telergma Airfield, Algeria, 5 May 1943
- El Bathan Airfield, Tunisia, 3 June 1943
- Sainte Marie du Zit Airfield, Tunisia, 25 July 1943
- Triolo Airfield, Italy, 12 December 1943 (operated From: Corsica 10–21 August 1944)
- Lesina Airfield, Italy, September 1945 – 9 September 1945
- Dow Field (later Dow Air Force Base), Maine, 20 November 1946 – 2 October 1949
- Dow Air Force Base, Maine, 1 November 1952
- Hanscom Field, Massachusetts, 5 November 1955
- Griffiss Air Force Base, New York, 1 July 1959 – 7 July 1987
- Columbus Air Force Base, Mississippi, 25 June 1990 – 18 September 1992
- Columbus Air Force Base, Mississippi, 1 July 1993
- Moody Air Force Base, Georgia, 31 December 2000
- Columbus Air Force Base, Mississippi, 10 May 2007 – present)

=== Aircraft ===
- Curtiss P-40 Warhawk (1941)
- Republic P-43 Lancer (1941)
- P-66 Vanguard (1941)
- Lockheed P-38 Lightning (1941–1945)
- Republic P-47 Thunderbolt (1946–1949)
- Republic F-84 Thunderjet (1947–1949)
- Lockheed F-80C Shooting Star (1952–1953)
- North American F-86F Sabre (1953–1954)
- North American F-86D Sabre (1954–1956)
- North American F-86L Sabre (1956–1959)
- Lockheed T-33 Shooting Star (1952–1953, 1956–1986)
- Northrop F-89J Scorpion (1959)
- McDonnell F-101B Voodoo (1959–1968)
- McDonnell F-101F Voodoo (1959–1968)
- F-106 Delta Dart (1968–1987)
- T-38 Talon (1990–1992, 2000–present)
- AT-38 Talon (1993–2000)

=== Awards and campaigns ===
Award streamer	Award	Dates	Notes
	Distinguished Unit Citation	2 April 1944	49th Fighter Squadron, Austria
	Air Force Outstanding Unit Award	1 July 1974-30 June 1975	49th Fighter-Interceptor Squadron
	Air Force Outstanding Unit Award	1 October 1975-31 July 1977	49th Fighter-Interceptor Squadron
	Air Force Outstanding Unit Award	1 July-17 September 1992 and 23 July 1993 – 30 June 1994	49th Flying Training Squadron
	Air Force Outstanding Unit Award	1 July 2000-1 October 2000	49th Flying Training Squadron
	Air Force Outstanding Unit Award	1 January 2001–31 December 2002	49th Flying Training Squadron
	Air Force Outstanding Unit Award	1 January 2003–30 June 2004	49th Flying Training Squadron (later Fighter Training Squadron)
	Air Force Outstanding Unit Award	1 Jul 2003–30 Jun 2005	49th Fighter Training Squadron

Campaign Streamer	Campaign	Dates	Notes
	Air Offensive, Europe	18 August 1942 – 5 June 1944	49th Fighter Squadron
	Tunisia	15 November 1942 – 13 May 1943	49th Fighter Squadron
	Sicily	14 May 1943 – 17 August 1943	49th Fighter Squadron
	Naples-Foggia	18 August 1943 – 21 January 1944	49th Fighter Squadron
	Anzio	22 January 1944 – 24 May 1944	49th Fighter Squadron
	Rome-Arno	22 January 1944 – 9 September 1944	49th Fighter Squadron
	Normandy	6 June 1944 – 24 July 1944	49th Fighter Squadron
	Northern France	25 July 1944 – 14 September 1944	49th Fighter Squadron
	Southern France	15 August 1944 – 14 September 1944	49th Fighter Squadron
	North Apennines	10 September 1944 – 4 April 1945	49th Fighter Squadron
	Rhineland	15 September 1944 – 21 March 1945	49th Fighter Squadron
	Central Europe	22 March 1944 – 21 May 1945	49th Fighter Squadron
	Po Valley	3 April 1945 – 8 May 1945	49th Fighter Squadron
	Air Combat, EAME Theater	18 August 1942 – 11 May 1945	49th Fighter Squadron

Po Valley; Air Combat, EAME Theater.

== See also ==
- The Cornfield Bomber, an airplane formerly assigned to the 49th FTS.
