= Columbus Air Force Base =

US Air Force base near Mississippi, US

- Near Columbus, Mississippi in United States of America
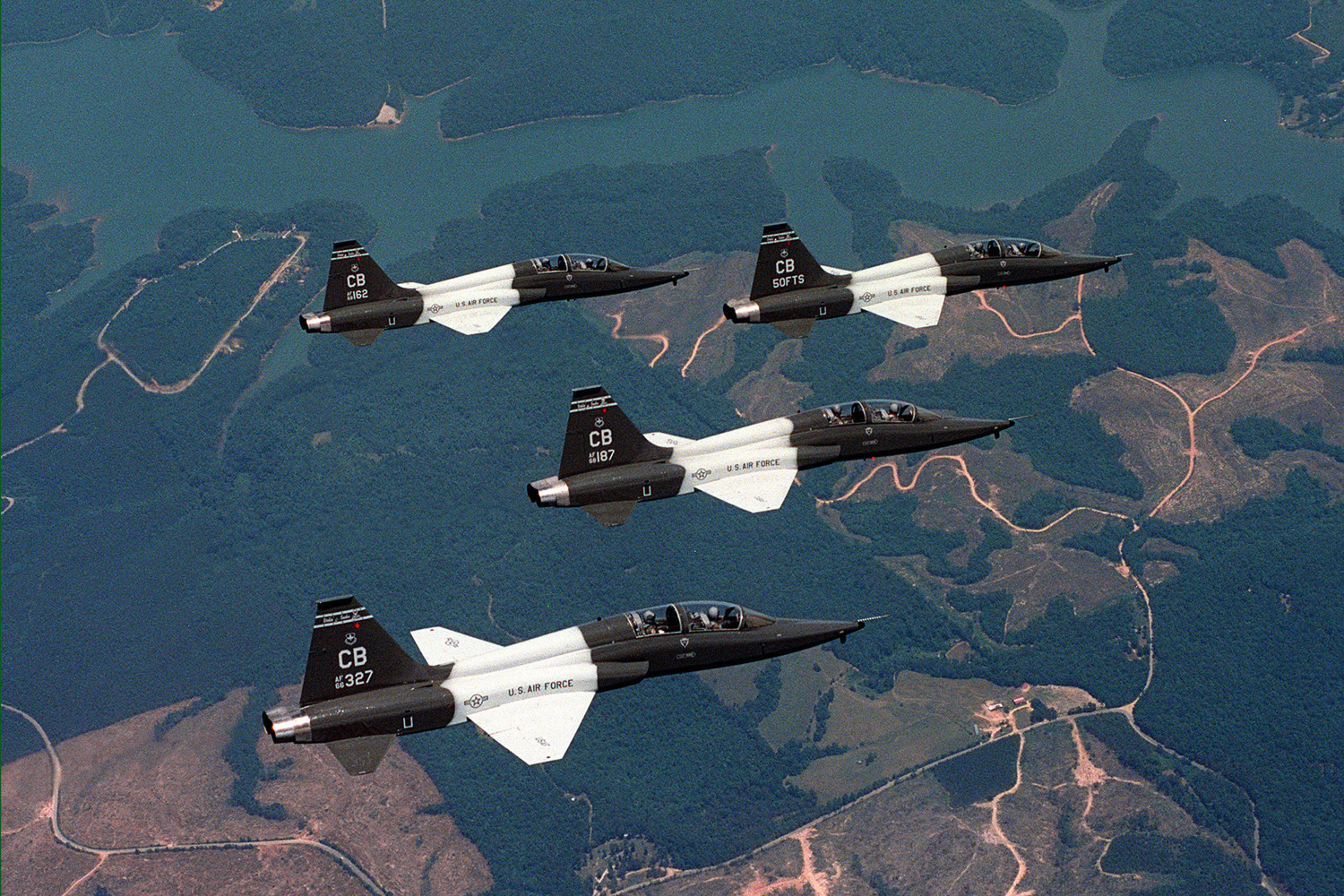
- Northrop T-38C formation from the 50th Flying Training Squadron based at Columbus AFB.

Site information
- Type: US Air Force Base
- Owner: Department of Defense
- Operator: US Air Force
- Controlled by: Air Education and Training Command (AETC)
- Condition: Operational
- Website: www.columbus.af.mil

Location
- Location within North America Location within the United States Location within Mississippi
- Coordinates: 33°38′09″N 88°26′27″W

Site history
- Built: 1941
- In use: 1941–1946 and 1950 – present

Garrison information
- Garrison: 14th Flying Training Wing

Airfield information
- Identifiers: IATA: CBM, ICAO: KCBM, FAA LID: CBM, WMO: 723306
- Elevation: 66 m (218 ft) AMSL
Runways
Direction	Length and surface
13C/31C	3,659 m (12,004 ft) Concrete
13L/31R	2,439 m (8,001 ft) Concrete
13R/31L	1,930 m (6,320 ft) Concrete

Columbus Air Force Base (IATA: CBM, ICAO: KCBM, FAA LID: CBM) is a United States Air Force base located in unincorporated Lowndes County, Mississippi, near Columbus. The host unit at Columbus AFB is the 14th Flying Training Wing (14 FTW), which is a part of Air Education and Training Command (AETC).

The residential portion of the base is a census-designated place, with a population of 1,604 at the 2020 census.

== Base history ==
Columbus Air Force Base (AFB) was established in 1941, after the US War Department authorized a pilot training base near Columbus, Mississippi. It was originally named Kaye Field, after World War I flying ace Samuel Kaye Jr., but confusion with nearby Key Field in Meridian, Mississippi led to it being renamed as Columbus Army Flying School. The base was deactivated after the end of World War II, but was reactivated four years later with the beginning of the Korean War.

In 1955, Columbus AFB was transferred to Strategic Air Command (SAC) and was occupied by the 4228th Strategic Wing, which later became the 454th Bombardment Wing. In 1969, Columbus AFB was transferred back to Air Training Command, and was occupied by the 3650th Pilot Training Wing, which became the 14th Flying Training Wing in 1972.

== Based units ==
Flying and notable non-flying units based at Columbus Air Force Base.

Units marked GSU are Geographically Separate Units, which although based at Columbus, are subordinate to a parent unit based at another location.

=== United States Air Force ===
Air Education and Training Command (AETC)

- Nineteenth Air Force
  - 14th Flying Training Wing
    - 14th Comptroller Squadron
    - 14th Operations Group
      - 14th Operations Support Squadron
      - 14th Student Squadron
      - 37th Flying Training Squadron – T-6A Texan II
      - 41st Flying Training Squadron – T-6A Texan II
      - 43rd Flying Training Squadron
      - 48th Flying Training Squadron – T-1A Jayhawk
      - 49th Fighter Training Squadron – T-38C Talon
      - 50th Flying Training Squadron – T-38C Talon
    - 14th Mission Support Group
      - 14th Civil Engineering Squadron
      - 14th Communications Squadron
      - 14th Contracting Squadron
      - 14th Force Support Squadron
      - 14th Logistics Readiness Squadron
      - 14th Security Forces Squadron
    - 14th Medical Group
      - 14th Medical Operations Squadron
      - 14th Medical Support Squadron

Air Force Reserve Command (AFRC)

- Tenth Air Force
  - 340th Flying Training Group
    - 43rd Flying Training Squadron (GSU) – T-1A Jayhawk, T-6A Texan II

== Demographics ==
Columbus Air Force Base CDP
- Census-designated place
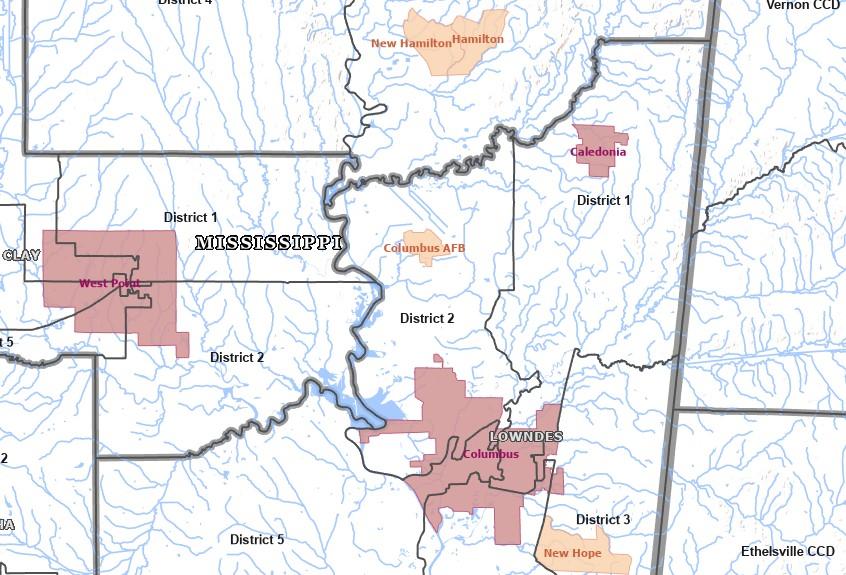

- Location within Mississippi Location within the United States
- Country: United States
- State: Mississippi
- County: Lowndes
- Elevation: 200 ft (61 m)

Population (2020)
  - Total: 1,604
- Time zone: UTC−6 (Central (CST))
  - Summer (DST): UTC−5 (CDT)
- GNIS feature ID: 2402790

Columbus Air Force Base CDP is a census-designated place (CDP) and the official name for an area covering the residential population of the Columbus Air Force Base, in Lowndes County, Mississippi, United States. The population at the 2020 census was 1,604.

Historical population
Census	Pop.	Note	%±
2000	2,060		—
2010	1,373		−33.3%
2020	1,604		16.8%
U.S. Decennial Census; 2010 2020

=== Racial and ethnic composition ===
Columbus AFB CDP, Mississippi – Racial and ethnic composition Note: the US Census treats Hispanic/Latino as an ethnic category. This table excludes Latinos from the racial categories and assigns them to a separate category. Hispanics/Latinos may be of any race.
Race / Ethnicity (NH = Non-Hispanic)	Pop 2000	Pop 2010	Pop 2020	% 2000	% 2010	% 2020
White alone (NH)	1,511	1,016	1,128	73.35%	74.00%	70.32%
Black or African American alone (NH)	329	154	121	15.97%	11.22%	7.54%
Native American or Alaska Native alone (NH)	14	2	6	0.68%	0.15%	0.37%
Asian alone (NH)	51	46	84	2.48%	3.35%	5.24%
Native Hawaiian or Pacific Islander alone (NH)	1	20	4	0.05%	1.46%	0.25%
Other race alone (NH)	1	3	9	0.05%	0.22%	0.56%
Mixed race or Multiracial (NH)	53	32	103	2.57%	2.33%	6.42%
Hispanic or Latino (any race)	100	100	149	4.85%	7.28%	9.29%
Total	2,060	1,373	1,604	100.00%	100.00%	100.00%

== Education ==
Parents of dependent children on-post may choose to send their children to Columbus Municipal School District schools or to Lowndes County School District's Caledonia School. There are no schools located on-post.

East Mississippi Community College is the designated community college for Lowndes County.

== See also ==
- List of United States Air Force installations
