= 14th Flying Training Wing =

14th Flying Training Wing

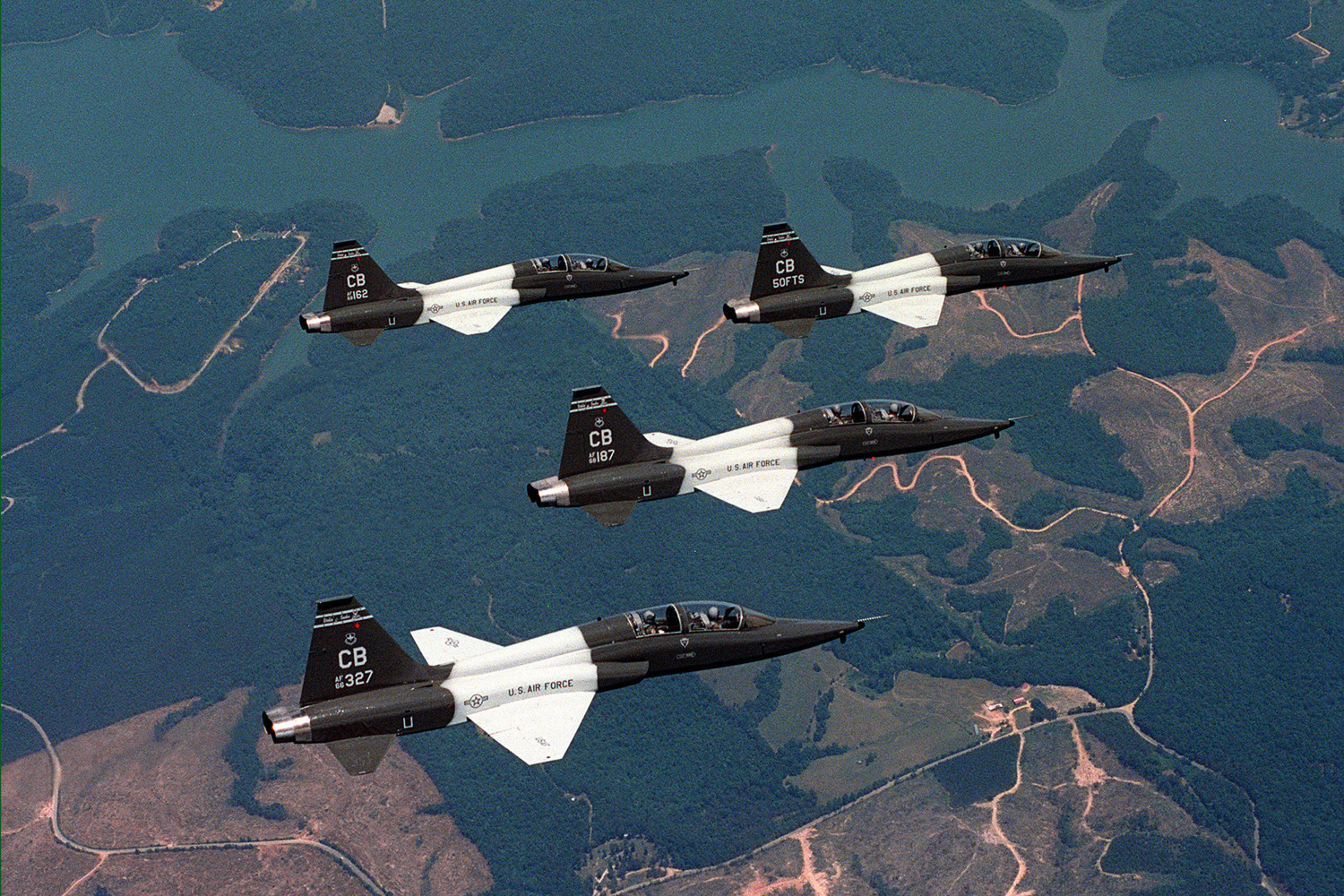
- Northrop T-38C formation from the 50th Flying Training Squadron (Note: Northrop T-38C Talons serials 66-4327, 68–8162 and 68-8187 are identifiable.)
- Active: 1947–1949; 1966–1971; 1972–present
- Country: United States
- Branch: United States Air Force
- Role: Undergraduate Pilot Training
- Part of: Air Education and Training Command: Nineteenth Air Force
- Garrison/HQ: Columbus Air Force Base
- Nickname: Team Blaze
- Mottos: "Cultivate Airman, Create Pilots and Connect"
- Engagements: Vietnam War
- Decorations: Presidential Unit Citation; Air Force Meritorious Unit Award; Air Force Outstanding Unit Award with Combat "V" Device; Air Force Outstanding Unit Award; Republic of Vietnam Gallantry Cross with Palm

Commanders
- Current commander: Col. Joshua D. Jensen
- Deputy Commander: Col. Stubbendorff
- Command Chief: CMSgt Lebaron M. King
- Notable commanders: Robert H. Foglesong

Insignia
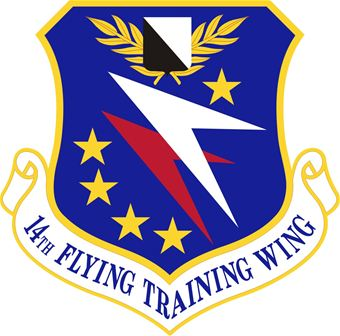
- 14th Flying Training Wing emblem (Note: Approved 19 June 1967, restored 21 December 2007.)

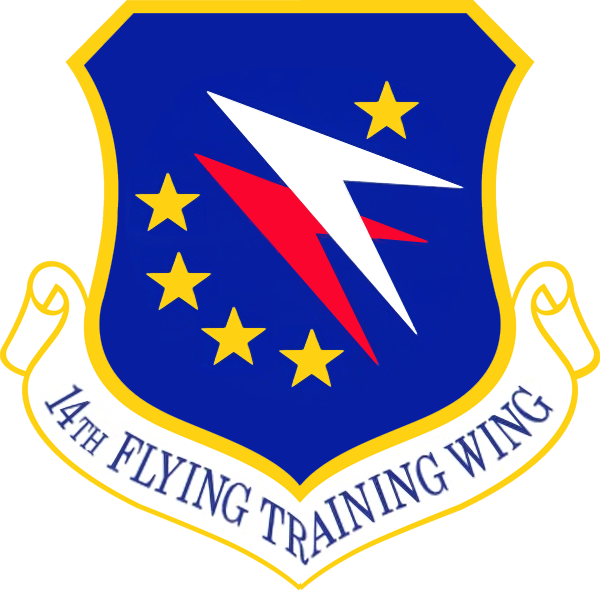
- Earlier 14th Flying Training Wing emblem (Note: Approved 16 September 1994.)

The 14th Flying Training Wing is a wing of the United States Air Force based out of Columbus Air Force Base, Mississippi.

The 14th Operations Group and its six squadrons are responsible for the 52-week Undergraduate Pilot Training (UPT) mission. The group also performs quality assurance for contract aircraft maintenance.

The 14th Mission Support Group provides essential services with a 5-squadron/2-division, 750+ person work force and $38 million budget. It operates/maintains facilities and infrastructure for a 6,013-acre (24.33 km^{2}) pilot training base and provides contracting, law enforcement, supply, transportation, fire protection, communications, education, recreation and personnel management for 9,500 people. The group is also responsible for wartime preparedness and contingency operations.

== History ==
=== Air Defense ===
The 14th Fighter Wing was established on 29 July 1947. It provided air defense for the northeastern United States, 1947–1949.

=== Vietnam War ===
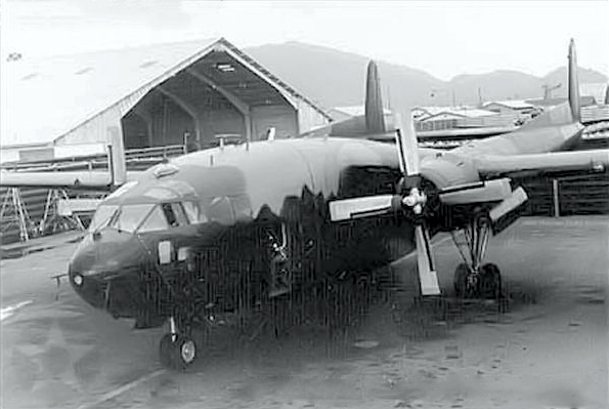
Fairchild AC-119G "Shadow" gunship Serial 53-3178 17th Special Operations Squadron – 1969. Transferred to Republic of Vietnam Air Force in 1971.

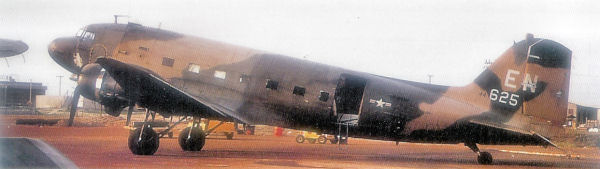
Douglas AC-47B-30-DK "Spooky" gunship Serial 44-76625 of the 4th Special Operations Squadron- March 1969

The unit was redesignated as the 14th Air Commando Wing and was reactivated at Nha Trang Air Base Republic of Vietnam on 8 March 1966. On 1 August 1968 it was renamed the 14th Special Operations Wing and was the host unit at the base until 30 September 1971. From 15 October 1969 through 30 September 1971 the 14th SOW also operated and conducted missions from Phan Rang Air Base, Republic of Vietnam.

Operations included close and direct air support, interdiction, combat airlift, aerial resupply, visual and photographic reconnaissance, unconventional warfare, counterinsurgency operations, psychological warfare (including leaflet dropping and aerial broadcasting), forward air control operations and escort, search and rescue, escort for convoy and defoliation operations, flare drops, civic actions, and humanitarian actions.

The 14th Air Commando Wing distinguished itself by extraordinary heroism, exceptional gallantry and outstanding performance of duty in action against hostile forces in Southeast Asia from 8 March 1966 to 7 March 1967, earning a Presidential Unit Citation. Flying thousands of different sorties, elements of the Wing caused many enemy casualties and destroyed or damaged more than 8,500 structures, 500 trucks and 60 fuel sites as well as numerous automatic weapon positions, radio stations, bridges and boats.

Flying the venerable Douglas C-47 aircraft, one squadron of the Wing helped abort a large number of night hostile operations against friendly forts and hamlets through flare drops and minigun saturation fire. Despite the often heavy and accurate enemy antiaircraft fire, the search and rescue missions of the Wing recovered 91 skilled airmen during this period. In addition, the Wing's psychological warfare missions directly or indirectly influenced the surrender of thousands of enemy soldiers.

The wing also provided maintenance support for a number of tenants. The wing trained Republic of Vietnam Air Force (RVNAF) personnel in AC-119 operations and maintenance, February–August 1971, and transferred some of its AC-119s to the RVNAF, August–September 1971 as part of its phase-down to being inactivated.

=== Flying training at Columbus ===
The reborn 14th FTW replaced, and absorbed resources of, the 3650th Pilot Training Wing in June 1972 at Columbus Air Force Base, Mississippi. It assumed the base's undergraduate pilot training program, plus base operations and maintenance.

== Units ==
The 14th Flying Training Wing is currently made up of:

- 14th Operations Group (14 OG)

37th Flying Training Squadron (37 FTS)
41st Flying Training Squadron (41 FTS)
48th Flying Training Squadron (48 FTS)
49th Fighter Training Squadron (49 FTS)
50th Flying Training Squadron (50 FTS)
14th Operations Support Squadron (14 OSS)
14th Student Squadron (14 STUS)

- 14th Mission Support Group (14 MSG)

14th Civil Engineering Squadron (14 CES)
14th Communications Squadron (14 CS)
14th Contracting Squadron (14 CONS)
14th Force Support Squadron (14 FSS)
14th Logistics Readiness Squadron (14 LRS)
14th Security Forces Squadron (14 SFS)

Additionally, the 14th Comptroller Squadron (14 CPTS) reports directly to the wing.

== Lineage ==
- Established as the 14th Fighter Wing on 29 July 1947

Organized on 15 August 1947
Inactivated on 2 October 1949

- Redesignated 14th Air Commando Wing and activated on 28 February 1966 (not organized)

Organized on 8 March 1966
Redesignated 14th Special Operations Wing on 1 August 1968
Inactivated on 30 September 1971

- Redesignated 14th Flying Training Wing on 22 March 1972

Activated on 1 June 1972

=== Assignments ===
- First Air Force, 15 August 1947 – 2 October 1949
- Pacific Air Forces, 28 February 1966
- 2d Air Division, 8 March 1966
- Seventh Air Force, 1 April 1966 – 30 September 1971
- Air Training (later, Air Education and Training) Command, 1 June 1972
- Nineteenth Air Force, 1 July 1993 – present

=== Components ===
Group

- 14th Fighter (later, 14th Operations): 15 August 1947 – 2 October 1949; 15 December 1991 – present

Squadrons

- 1st Air Commando: 8 March 1966 – 20 December 1967
- 3d Air Commando (later, 3d Special Operations): 1 May 1968 – 15 September 1969
- 4th Air Commando (later, 4th Special Operations): 8 March 1966 – 15 December 1969
- 5th Air Commando (later, 5th Special Operations): 8 March 1966 – 15 October 1969
- 6th Air Commando: 29 February – 15 July 1968
- 9th Air Commando (later, 9th Special Operations): 25 January 1967 – 30 September 1971
- 14th Air Commando: 25 October 1967 – 1 May 1968
- 15th Air Commando (later, 15th Special Operations): 15 March 1968 – 31 October 1970
- 17th Special Operations: 1 June 1969 – 30 September 1971
- 18th Special Operations: 1 October 1969 – 25 August 1971
- 20th Air Commando (later, 20th Special Operations): 8 March 1966 – 1 September 1971
- 37th Flying Training: 1 June 1972 – 15 December 1991
- 42d Flying Training: 25 June 1990 – 15 December 1991
- 43d Flying Training: 25 June 1990 – 15 December 1991
- 49th Flying Training: 25 June 1990 – 15 December 1991
- 50th Flying Training: 1 June 1972 – 15 December 1991
- 71st Special Operations: 20 December 1968 – 10 June 1969
- 90th Special Operations: 31 October 1970 – 1 September 1971
- 602d Air Commando: 8 March 1966 – 8 April 1967
- 604th Air Commando (later, 604th Special Operations): 15 November 1967 – 1 March 1970 (detached)
- 3588th Flying Training: 1 October 1990 – 18 October 1991

=== Stations ===
- Dow Field (later Dow Air Force Base), Maine, 15 August 1947 – 2 October 1949
- Nha Trang Air Base, South Vietnam, 8 March 1966
- Phan Rang Air Base, South Vietnam, 15 October 1969 – 30 September 1971
- Columbus Air Force Base, Mississippi, 1 June 1972 – present

=== Aircraft ===
- F-84 Thunderjet (1947–1949)
- A-1 Skyraider (1966–1968)
- AC-47 Spooky (1966–1969)
- C-47 Skytrain (1966–1971)
- HC-47 (1966–1969)
- U-10 Super Courier (1966–1969)
- CH-3 Jolly Green Giant (1966–1969)
- O-2 Skymaster (1967–1971)
- UH-1 Iroquois (1967–1971)
- C-130E(I) Combat Talon1968–1971 (Note: Combat Talons designation prior to their MC- designation in 1977 are now referred to as "UWC-130E", for unconventional warfare.) (1968–1971)
- C-123 Provider (1968–1971)
- AC-130 Spectre (1968)
- AC-119G Shadow /AC-119K Stinger (1968–1971)
- T-41 Mescalero (1972–1973)
- T-37 (1972–2008)
- T-38 Talon (1972–present)
- AT-38 Talon (1993–2000 and 2007–present)
- T-1 Jayhawk (1996–present)
- T-6 Texan II (2006–present)
