= 41st Flying Training Squadron =

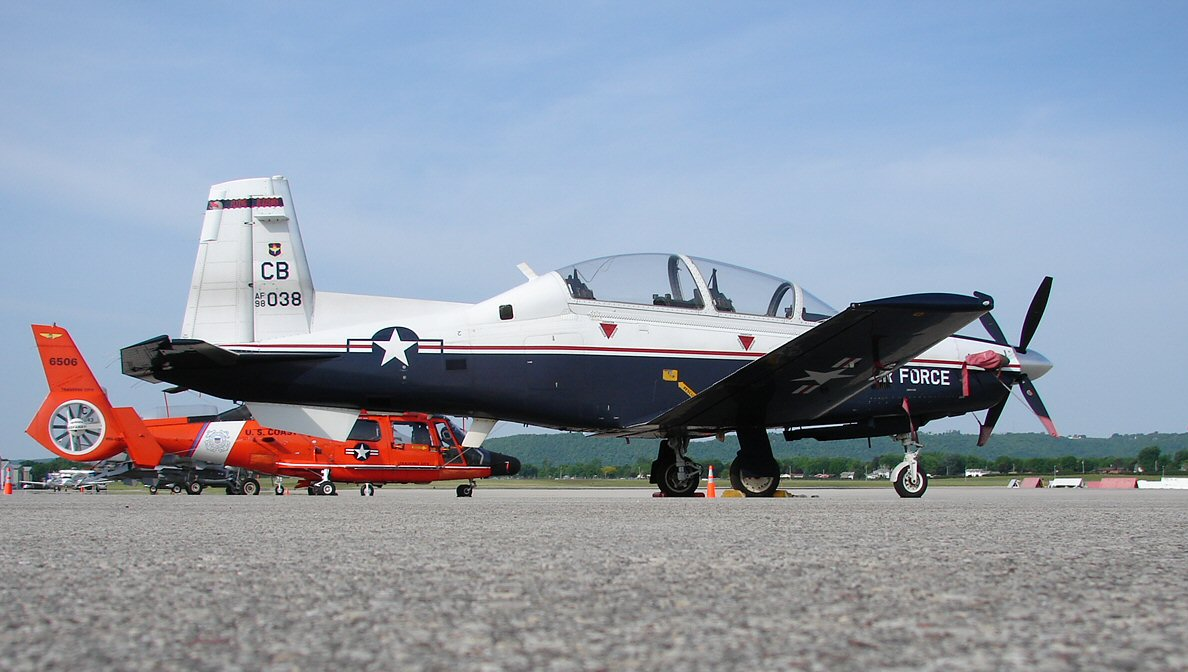
- 14th Flying Training Wing T-6 Texan II
- Active: 1940–1960; 1990–1997; 1998–present
- Country: United States
- Branch: United States Air Force
- Role: Pilot Training
- Part of: Air Education and Training Command
- Garrison/HQ: Columbus Air Force Base
- Nickname: Flying Buzzsaws
- Motto: A Cut Above
- Engagements: Southwest Pacific Theater; Korean War
- Decorations: Distinguished Unit Citation; Air Force Outstanding Unit Award; Philippine Presidential Unit Citation; Republic of Korea Presidential Unit Citation

Commanders
- Current commander: Lt Col. Steven “Meathead” Mount

Insignia
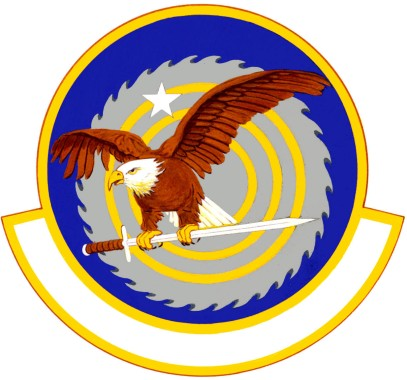
- 41st Flying Training Squadron emblem (approved 10 May 1990)

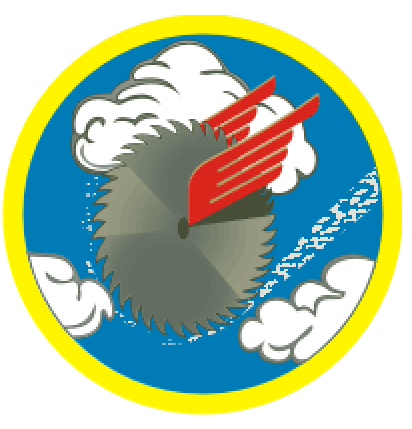
- 41st Pursuit Squadron emblem (approved 4 October 1941)

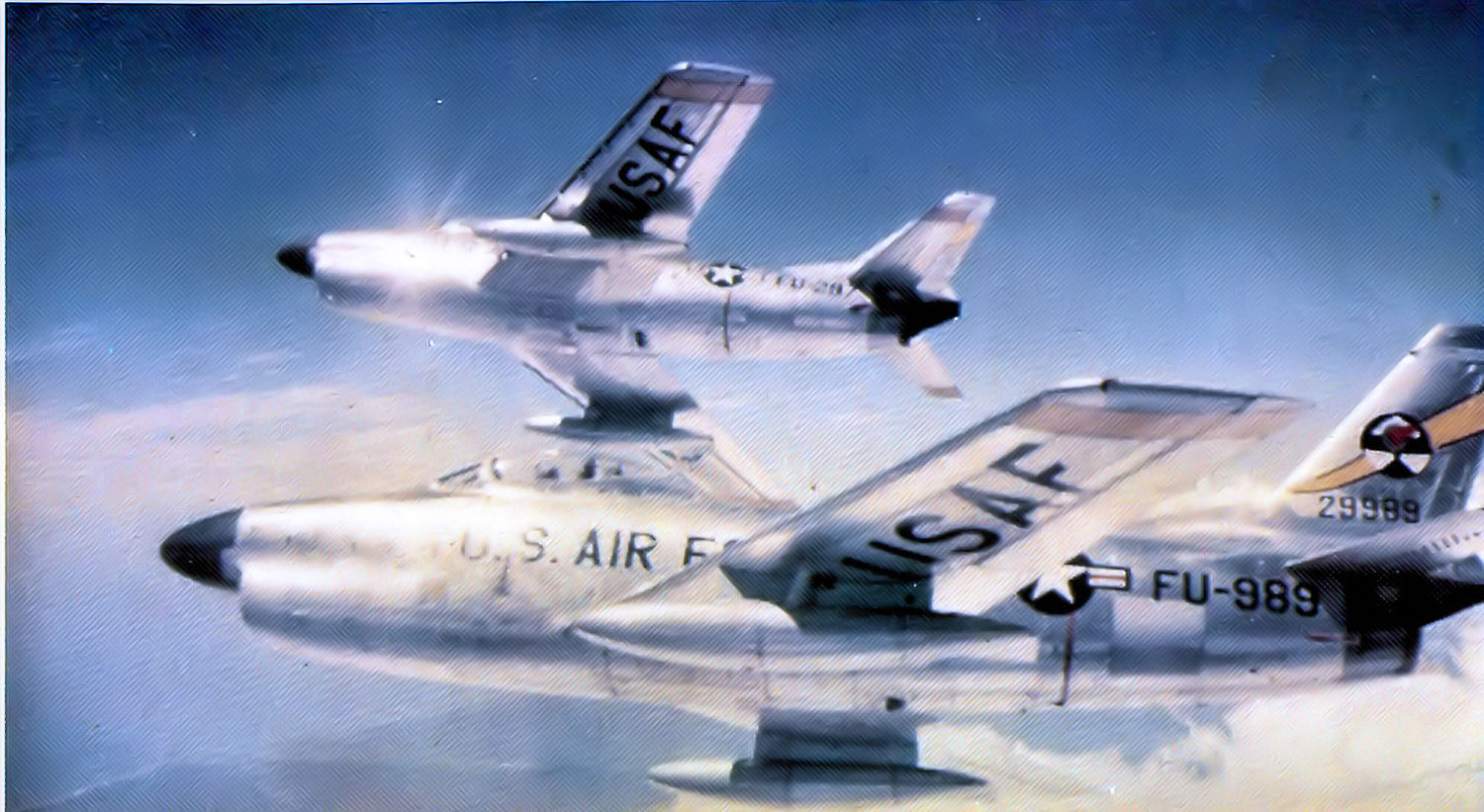
41st FIS F-86D 52–9989 over Japan, 1955

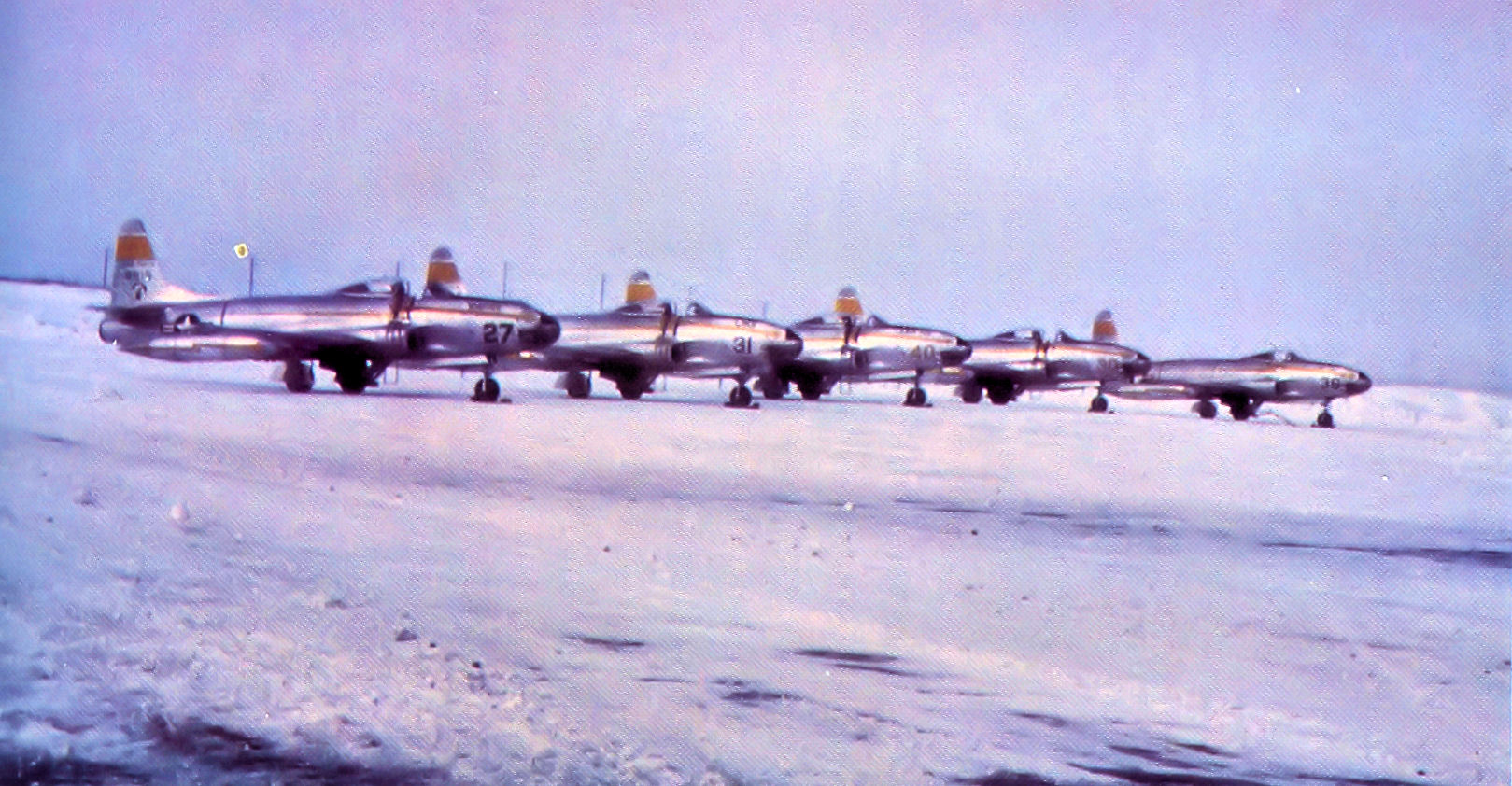
F-80s – Johnson Air Base – (Deployed at Misawa AB, Japan), January 1951

The 41st Flying Training Squadron is part of the 14th Flying Training Wing based at Columbus Air Force Base, Mississippi. It operates Beechcraft T-6 Texan II aircraft conducting flight training.

The squadron's mission is to train future Air Force military aviators in Specialized Undergraduate Pilot Training Phase 2 in the T-6A. Additionally, the 41st trains several foreign military pilots each year in the T-6, through both Foreign Military Sales program and the international Aviation Leadership Program. To accomplish its mission, the squadron annually flies over 17,200 sorties and 22,000 flight hours. The squadron also qualifies and sustains 80–90 mission-ready T-6 instructor pilots. The "Flying Buzzsaws" are currently commanded by Lt Col Timothy "Bogey" Thoren.

== History ==
The squadron flew antisubmarine patrols off the coast of Washington from 14 December 1941 – 21 January 1942.

Transferred to the Southwest Pacific theater in early 1942, the 41st converted to the Bell P-39 Airacobra at Sydney, Australia. Scrambled in response to an attack on Sydney Harbour by Japanese submarines, 1/Lt George Cantello died when his P-39 crashed, soon after takeoff.

On 23 July 1942, the squadron commenced frontline combat sorties in New Guinea, including air patrols, bomber escort, and close air support. It later converted to the Republic P-47 Thunderbolt. Combat sorties continued until 14 August 1945.

During the Korean War, the squadron flew air defense sorties over Japan. It had been re-designated the 41st Fighter-Interceptor Squadron. It conducted academic training for pilots and managed the accelerated copilot enrichment training program from, 1990–1991 and has conducted student flight training since 1998.

== Lineage ==
- Constituted as the 41st Pursuit Squadron (Interceptor) on 22 December 1939

Activated on 1 February 1940
Redesignated 41st Fighter Squadron on 15 May 1942
Redesignated 41st Fighter Squadron, Single-Engine on 14 February 1944
Redesignated 41st Fighter-Interceptor Squadron on 20 January 1950
Discontinued and inactivated on 8 March 1960

- Redesignated 41st Flying Training Squadron on 1 January 1990

Activated on 10 January 1990
Inactivated on 15 May 1991

- Activated on 1 October 1998

=== Assignments ===
- 31st Pursuit Group, 1 February 1940
- 35th Pursuit Group (later 35th Fighter Group, 35th Fighter-Interceptor Group), 15 January 1942 (attached to 6162d Air Base Wing, 1 December 1950 – 25 June 1951)
- 327th Air Division, 1 October 1957 – 8 March 1960
- 64th Flying Training Wing, 10 January 1990 – 15 May 1991
- 14th Operations Group, 1 October 1998 – present

=== Stations ===
- Bolling Field, District of Columbia, 1 February 1940
- Selfridge Field, Michigan, 21 October 1940
- Baer Field, Indiana, 6 December 1941
- Paine Field, Washington, c. 15 December 1941 – 21 January 1941
- Lampang Airport, Lampang province, Thailand, 22 December 1941 - 27 December 1941
- Archerfield Airport, Australia, 25 February 1942
- Ballarat Airport, Ballarat, Australia, 8 March 1942
- Mount Gambier Airport, Australia, 17 March 1942
- Bankstown Airfield, Australia, 7 April 1942
- Rogers Airfield (30 Mile Drome), Port Moresby, New Guinea, c. 20 July 1942
- Tsili Tsili Airfield, New Guinea, 16 August 1943
- Nadzab Airfield Complex, New Guinea, 22 October 1943
- Gusap Airfield, New Guinea, 15 February 1944
- Nadzab Airfield Complex, New Guinea, 9 June 1944
- Kornasoren Airfield Noemfoor, Schouten Islands, New Guinea, 16 August 1944
- Owi Airfield, Schouten Islands, Netherlands East Indies, 17 September 1944
- Wama Airfield, Morotai, Netherlands East Indies, 17 October 1944
- Mangaldan Airfield, Luzon, Philippines, 21 January 1945
- Lingayen Airfield, Luzon, Philippines, 16 April 1945
- Clark Field, Luzon, Philippines, 20 April 1945
- Yontan Airfield, Okinawa, 30 June 1945
- Irumagawa Air Base, Japan, 10 October 1945
- Yokota Air Base, Japan, c. 25 March 1950
- Johnson Air Base, Japan, 14 August 1950

Detachments operated from Misawa Air Base, Japan 6 September 1950 – August 1951 and Niigata Air Base, Japan c. 25 May 1951 – 31 October 1954

- Yokota Air Base, Japan, 13 August 1954
- Andersen Air Force Base, Guam, c. 5 August 1956 – 8 March 1960
- Reese Air Force Base, Texas, 10 January 1990 – 15 May 1991
- Columbus Air Force Base, Mississippi, 1 October 1998 – present

=== Aircraft operated ===
- Seversky P-35 Guardsman (1940–1941)
- Bell P-39 Airacobra (1941–1943)
- Bell P-400 (1942–1944)
- Lockheed P-38 Lightning (1943)
- Republic P-47 Thunderbolt (1944–1945)
- North American P-51 Mustang (1945–1950)
- Lockheed F-80 Shooting Star (1950–1953)
- North American F-86D Sabre (1953–1960)
- Northrop T-38 Talon (1990–1991)
- Cessna T-37 Tweet (1998–2008)
- Beechcraft T-6 Texan II (2006–present)
