= Sainte Marie du Zit Airfield =

Abandoned military airfield in Tunisia

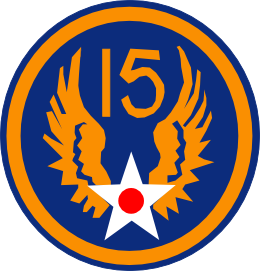
Sainte Marie du Zit Airfield

Site information
- Type: Military airfield
- Controlled by: United States Army Air Forces

Location
- Coordinates: 36°26′26.76″N 010°19′55.77″E

Site history
- Built: 1943
- In use: 1943

Location of Sainte Marie du Zit Airfield, Tunisia

Sainte Marie du Zit Airfield is an abandoned military airfield in Zaghwan province, Tunisia, located about 3 km northeast of Sainte-Marie du Zit, 17 km east-northeast of Zaghouan, and 50 km south of Tunis.

== History ==
The airfield was built by the German Luftwaffe during World War II. It was attacked by Ninth Air Force B-25 Mitchells on 3 April 1943, and seized by the United States Army on 9 May during the Battle of Tunisia.

It was repaired by Army engineers and improved for use by the United States Army Air Force Twelfth Air Force. The existing facility was expanded earth dispersal hardstands. Six-man tents were used for billeting, lined up in rows with the orderly room and the mess hall at one end. On 25 July, the 14th Fighter Group with three squadrons of P-38 Lightnings arrived.

After the Axis defeat in Tunisia, the 14th Fighter Group flew dive-bombing missions during the Allied assault on Pantelleria and helped prepare for and support the invasions of Sicily and Italy. Lieut H. T. Hanna made ace in one day by destroying five Junkers Ju 87 dive bombers on October 9, 1943. In November the group was assigned to Fifteenth Air Force and moved to Triolo Airfield, Italy on 12 December. The facilities at Sainte Marie du Zit were dismantled and the airfield was abandoned.

The land is now an agricultural area, the remains of the main runway being visible on aerial photography. A large disturbed area around the runway is still in evidence.
