= List of Lockheed P-38 Lightning operators =

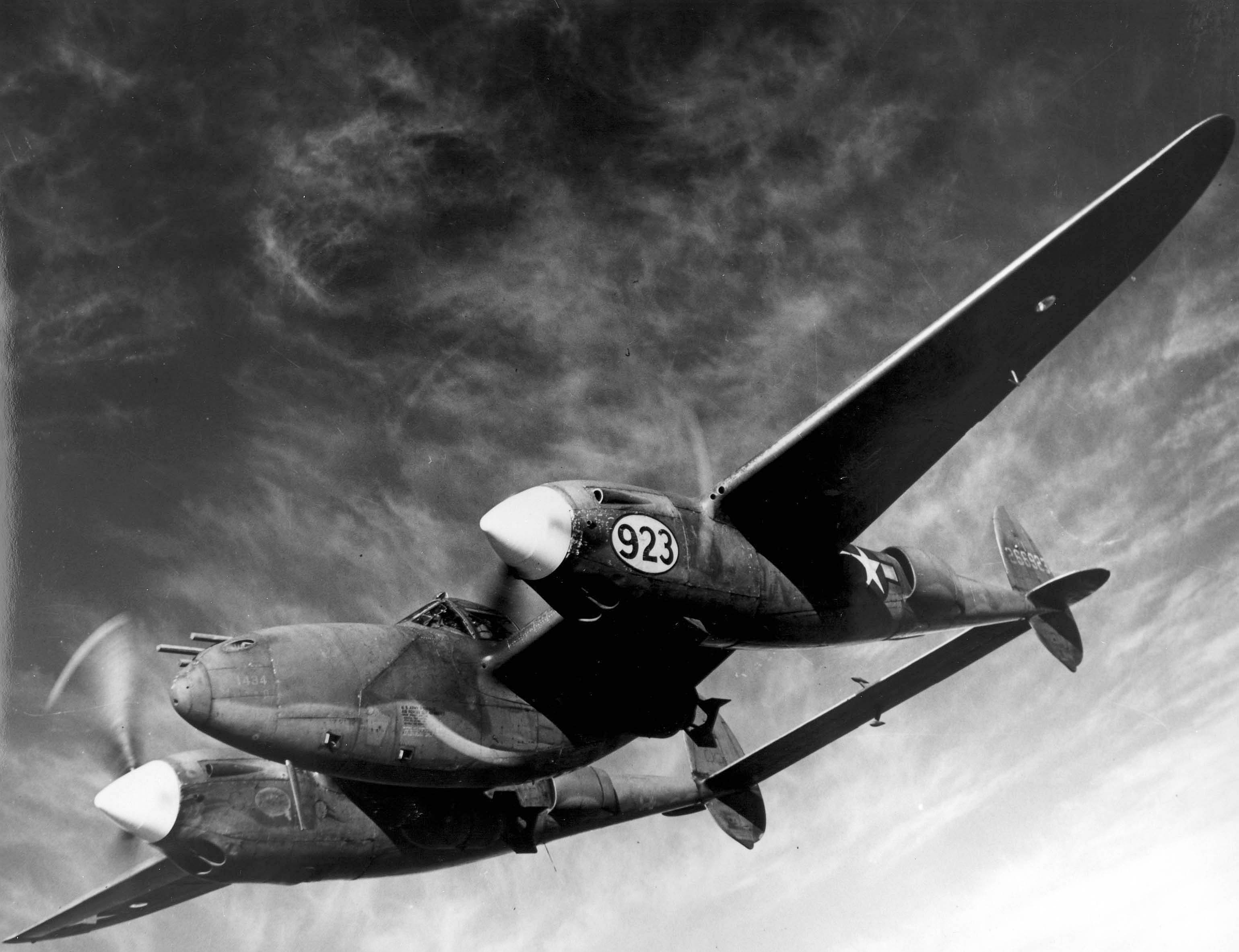

The following are units which operated the Lockheed P-38 Lightning:

== Operators ==
=== Australia ===
Royal Australian Air Force

The RAAF received five F-4s from August 31, 1942. These aircraft were used for frontline photoreconnaissance sorties. Three served with No. 1 Photo Reconnaissance Unit RAAF and two were attached to a fighter unit, No. 75 Squadron RAAF. The first to enter service with the RAAF, A55-1 was also the last to retire, following a crash on September 1, 1944.

=== China ===
Chinese Nationalist Air Force

Republic of China received 15 P-38Js and P-38Ls and, postwar, they also flew a similar number of F-5Es and F-5Gs.

=== Canada ===
Spartan Air Services Canada used eight Lightnings postwar as well as Mosquitos and a de Havilland Sea Hornet for mapping Canada.

=== Colombia ===
Geographic Institute Agustín Codazzi

=== Dominican Republic ===
The first P-38 of the Compañía de Aviación Air army arrived in Santiago on 30 March 1947. It was its first modern aircraft. The air force of this small Latin American republic employed 11 Lightnings, mostly not armed. Dominican Republic was one of the last P-38's users until late 1950, when the remaining Lightnings were cut up and dumped.

=== Free France ===
Free French Air Force

- Group 2/23 operated F-5As

French Air Force

- Groupe de Reconnaissance 2/33 operated the F-5G

=== Nazi Germany ===
- Zirkus Rosarius operated a few captured aircraft.

=== Honduras ===
Honduran Air Force

Honduras received 12 aircraft postwar.

=== Kingdom of Italy ===
Regia Aeronautica

Italian pilots started to face P-38s from late 1942 and these fighters, with their long range, high speed and powerful weaponry, were quickly established as a more dangerous foe than the previously used Supermarine Spitfire. A few P-38s fell into the hands of Germans and Italians, and, differently from captured Spitfires, these aircraft were tested and used in combat. P-38s were pitted against nearly all of the fighters in the Italian arsenal in tests at Guidonia and apparently, it fared well. Col. Tondi used a P-38, probably an 'E' version, that landed, because a navigation error, in Sardinia. Tondi then claimed at least 1 B-24 in his captured P-38, downed 11 August 1943. Shortly before Tondi attacked the bomber, an Italian Macchi MC.202 or 205 attacked, doing little damage. However, the heavy armament of P-38 proved devastating, indeed.

Italian Co-Belligerent Air Force

- 3° Aerobrigata RT
- 4° Aerobrigata

After capitulation, the Italian Co-Belligerent Air Force flew F-5A photo-reconnaissance missions. The Italian Air Force operated 50 late model aircraft postwar.

=== Italy ===
Italian Air Force

- 3° Stormo
- 4° Stormo

After the war, Italy received 100, or according to other sources, 120, dismantled ex-USAAF P-38s, in an agreement dated April 1946. Seven of these airframes were not rebuilt but were reserved for use as spares. The remaining 93, after a one-month refurbishment by IMM (Aerfer), were first issued to the 3rd Stormo in Bari and Lecce, in Apulia. They were a mix of P-38L fighters and PR conversions, including F-5E, G and H models. Six P-38s were modified as dual-control training craft, a version which had a separate cockpit with duplicated controls forward of the standard cockpit, in a lengthened nose. These unique training machines, which served with the SCOT (Scuola Caccia Ogni Tempo, meaning fighter school for all weather conditions) in Lecce and Foggia, were identified as P-38DC (Dual Control). The heavy fighters flew reconnaissance missions over the Balkans, as well as ground attack, naval cooperation and air superiority missions. Italian P-38s made their operational debut on 9 September 1948, when a single F-5 took photographs of objectives in the Balkans. Because of the big dimensions of this fighter, the old engines, and pilot errors, a very high number of P-38s were lost in accidents. At least thirty crashes of P-38s in Italian service claimed a number of victims. Despite this, many Italian pilots liked the fighter, due to its excellent visibility on the ground and its stability at takeoff. The P-38s were finally phased-out in Italy in 1956. Today, no Italian P-38s survive, nor even a single component from one, as these aircraft, because of the high value of their light alloys, were quickly recycled for their metal content.

=== Portugal ===
- Two interned Lightnings were forced to land in Lisbon, Portugal, while on a ferry flight from England to Algeria. Both were used by the Portuguese Air Force.

=== Soviet Union ===
- Soviet Air Force operated a few damaged and repaired ex-USAAF aircraft found in Eastern Europe.

=== United Kingdom ===
- Royal Air Force - the United Kingdom performed evaluation tests only.

=== United States ===
- United States Air Force
- United States Army Air Forces
- United States Navy

== See also ==
- Lockheed XP-49
- Lockheed XP-58 Chain Lightning
