= Roizen =

Roizen is a surname. Notable people with the surname include:

- Heidi Roizen (born 1958), American venture capitalist
- Jennifer Roizen, American chemist
- Michael Roizen (born 1946), American anesthesiologist and internist
- Peter Roizen (born 1946), American software developer, game creator and entrepreneur
