= Lifeboat =

Lifeboat or Lifeboats may refer to:

== Rescue vessels ==
- Lifeboat (shipboard), a small craft aboard a ship to allow for emergency escape
- Lifeboat (rescue), a boat designed for sea rescues
- Airborne lifeboat, an air-dropped boat used to save downed airmen

== Arts and entertainment ==
- Lifeboat (1944 film), directed by Alfred Hitchcock
- Lifeboat (2018 film), a documentary
- "Lifeboat" (Stargate SG-1), a 2003 television episode
- "Lifeboats" (Succession), a 2018 television episode
- Lifeboat sketch, a sketch shown on Monty Python's Flying Circus
- Lifeboat (album), a 2008 album by Jimmy Herring
- Lifeboat, a 1972 album by the Sutherland Brothers
- "Lifeboats", a song on Snow Patrol's 2008 album, A Hundred Million Suns
- "Lifeboat", a song from Heathers: The Musical

== Other uses ==
- The Life-Boat, a journal published by the Royal National Lifeboat Institution
- Lifeboat Associates, a software distributor and magazine publisher in the 1970s and 1980s
- Lifeboat Distribution, an international software distributor
- Lifeboat Foundation, an existential risk reduction organization
- The Lifeboat Inn, Thornham, Norfolk, England, a public house and inn
- Lifeboat (magazine), ingouse magazine of the Royal National Lifeboat Institution

== See also ==
- Lifeboat ethics, proposed by Garret Hardin based on the metaphor of a lifeboat
