= Semafor =

Semafor may refer to:

- Semafor (website), a global news website
- Se-ma-for, a Polish animation studio
- Semafor (theater), a theater in Prague, Czech Republic.

== See also ==
- Semaphore (disambiguation)
