= Industrial warfare =

Mass produced weapons on a grand scale

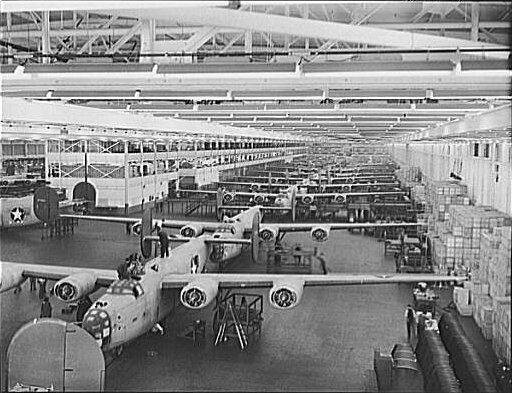
American B-24 Liberator bombers under construction during World War II.

Industrial warfare is a period in the history of warfare ranging roughly from the early 19th century and the start of the Industrial Revolution to the beginning of the Atomic Age, which saw the rise of nation-states, capable of creating and equipping large armies, navies, and air forces, through the process of industrialization.

The era featured mass-conscripted armies, rapid transportation (first on railroads, then by sea and air), telegraph and wireless communications, and the concept of total war. In terms of technology, this era saw the rise of rifled breech-loading infantry weapons capable of high rates of fire, high-velocity breech-loading artillery, chemical weapons, armoured warfare, metal warships, submarines, and aircraft.

== Total war ==
One of the main features of industrial warfare is the concept of "total war". The term was coined during World War I by Erich Ludendorff (and again in his 1935 book Total War), which called for the complete mobilization and subordination of all resources, including policy and social systems, to the German war effort. It has also come to mean waging warfare with absolute ruthlessness, and its most identifiable legacy today has been the reintroduction of civilians and civilian infrastructure as targets in destroying the enemy's ability to engage in war.

There are several reasons for the rise of total warfare in the 19th century. The main one is industrialization. As countries' capital and natural resources grew, it became clear that some forms of warfare demanded more resources than others. Consequently, the greater cost of warfare became evident. An industrialized nation could distinguish and then choose the intensity of warfare that it wished to engage in.

Additionally, warfare was becoming more mechanized and required greater infrastructure. Combatants could no longer live off the land, but required an extensive support network of people behind the lines to keep them fed and armed. This required the mobilization of the home front. Modern concepts like propaganda were first used to boost production and maintain morale, while rationing took place to provide more war material.

The earliest modern example of total war was the American Civil War. Union generals Ulysses S. Grant and William Tecumseh Sherman were convinced that, if the North was to be victorious, the Confederacy's strategic, economic, and psychological ability to wage war had to be definitively crushed. They believed that to break the backbone of the South, the North had to employ scorched earth tactics, or as Sherman called it, "Hard War". Sherman's advance through Georgia and the Carolinas was characterized by the widespread destruction of civilian supplies and infrastructure. In contrast to later conflicts, the damage done by Sherman was almost entirely limited to property destruction. In Georgia alone, Sherman claimed he and his men had caused $100,000,000 in damages.

== Conscription ==
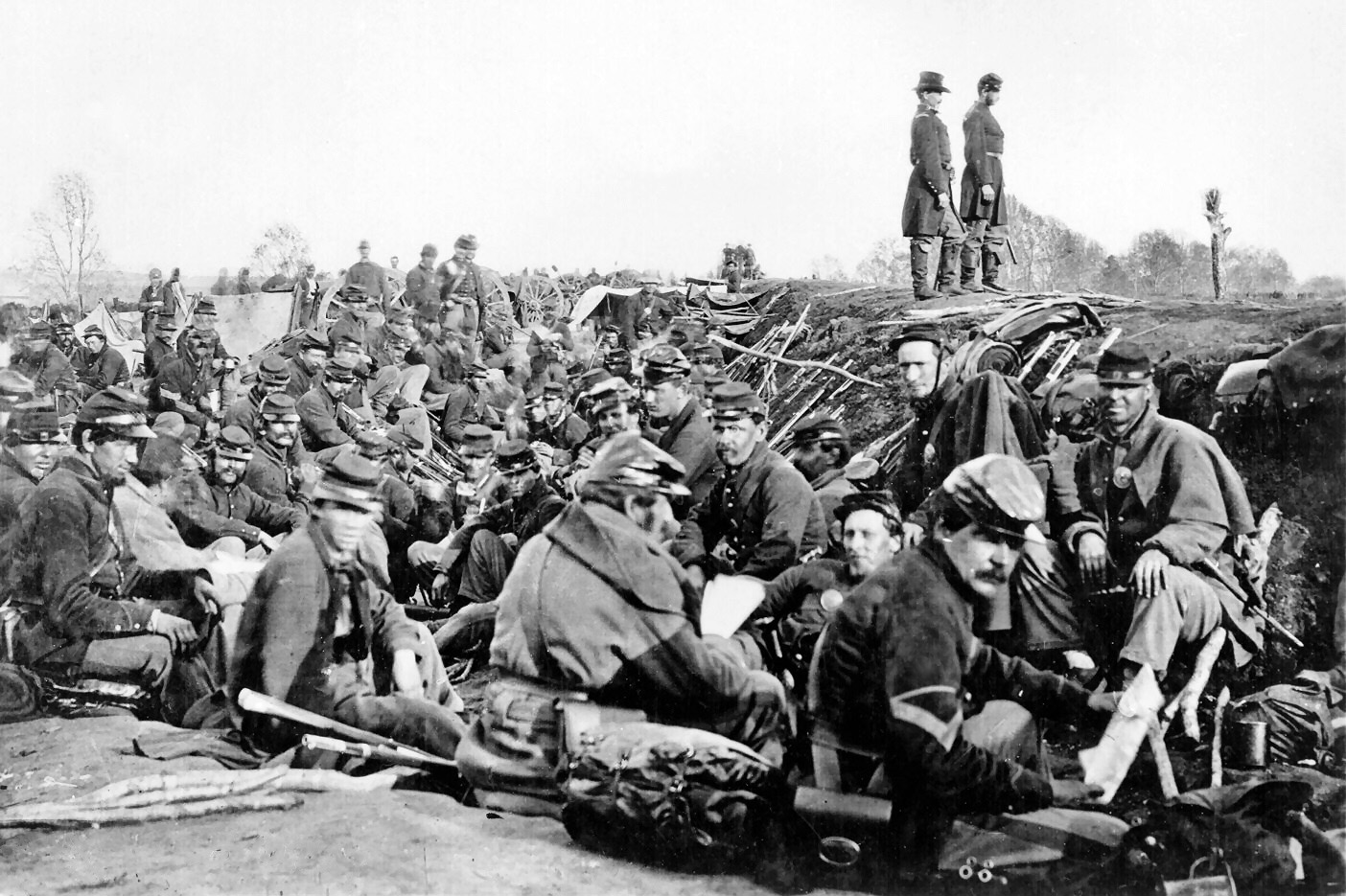
Soldiers engaged in trench warfare during the American Civil War.

Conscription is the compulsory enrollment of civilians into military service. Conscription allowed the French Republic to form La Grande Armée, what Napoleon Bonaparte called "the nation in arms", which successfully battled smaller, professional European armies.

Conscription, particularly when the conscripts are being sent to foreign wars that do not directly affect the security of the nation, has historically been highly politically contentious in democracies. For instance, during World War I, bitter political disputes broke out in Canada (see Conscription Crisis of 1917), Newfoundland, Australia and New Zealand (see Compulsory Military Training) over conscription. Canada also had a political dispute over conscription during World War II (see Conscription Crisis of 1944). Both South Africa and Australia put limits on where conscripts could fight in WWII. Similarly, mass protests against conscription to fight the Vietnam War occurred in several countries in the late 1960s.

In developed nations, the increasing emphasis on technological firepower and better-trained fighting forces, the sheer unlikelihood of a conventional military assault on most developed nations, as well as memories of widespread controversies over the Vietnam War, make mass conscription less likely, but still possible, in the future.

Russia, as well as many smaller nations such as Switzerland, retain mainly conscript armies.

== Transportation ==
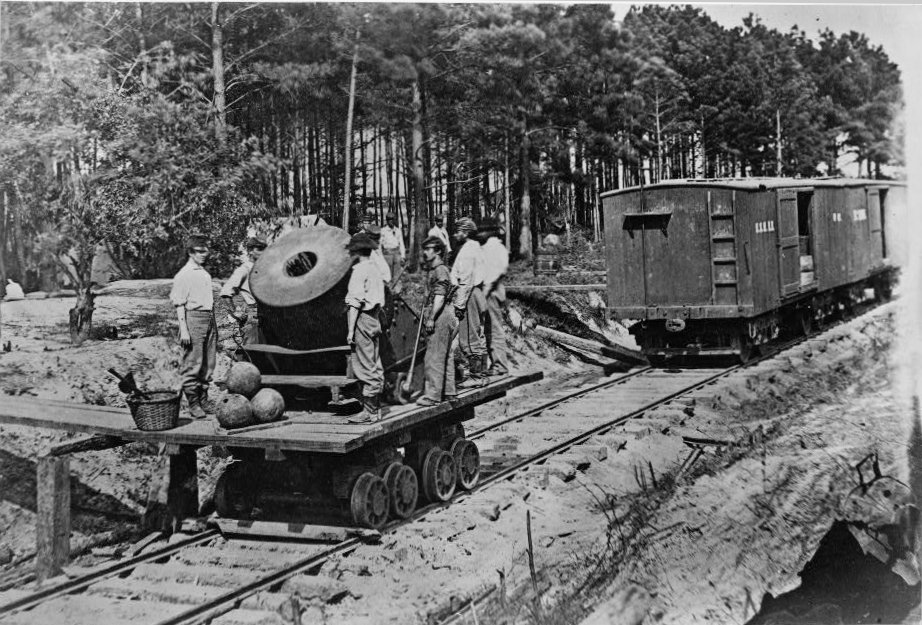
The advent of railroads (such as this one during the American Civil War) allowed armies to cover larger distances in shorter times while reducing fatigue.

=== Land ===
Prior to the invention of the motorized transport, combatants were transported by wagons, horses and by marching. With the advent of locomotives, large groups of combatants, supplies, and equipment were able to be transported faster and in larger numbers. To counter this, an opposing force would destroy rail lines to hinder their enemies' movements. General Sherman's men during the American Civil War, would destroy tracks, heat the rails, and wrap them around trees.

The mass transportation of combatants was further revolutionized with the advent of the internal combustion engine and the automobile. Combined with the widespread use of the machine gun, the horse, after millennia of use, was finally supplanted in its war time role. During both WWI and WWII, trucks were used to carry combatants and materiel, while cars and jeeps were used to scout enemy positions.

The mechanization of infantry occurred during WWII. The tank, a product of World War I independently invented by the British and French to break through trenches while withstanding machine gun fire, while discounted by many, came into its own. Tanks evolved from thin-skinned, lumbering vehicles into fast, powerful war machines of various types that dominated the battlefield and allowed the Germans to conquer most of Europe. As a result of the tank's evolution, a number of armored transport vehicles appeared, such as armoured personnel carriers and amphibious vehicles.

After the war ended, armored transports continued to evolve. The armored car and train declined in use, largely becoming relegated to military and civilian use as transportation for VIPs. Infantry fighting vehicles rose to prominence with the creation of the Soviet BMP-1. IFVs are a more combat capable version of the APC, with heavier armaments (such as autocannons), while still retaining the ability to transport combatants into and out of battles.

=== Sea ===
Sealift is a military logistics term referring to the use of cargo ships for the deployment of military assets, such as weaponry, military personnel, and materiel supplies. It complements other means of transport, such as strategic airlifters, in order to enhance a state's ability to project power. A state's sealift capabilities may include civilian-operated ships that normally operate by contract, but which can be chartered or commandeered during times of military necessity to supplement government-owned naval fleets.

During WWI, the United States bought, borrowed or commandeered vessels of various types, ranging from pleasure craft to ocean liners to transport the American Expeditionary Force to Europe. Many of these ships were scrapped, sold or returned to their owners after the war.

=== Air ===
There are two different kinds of airlifts in warfare, a strategic airlift and a tactical airlift. A strategic airlift is the use transporting of weapons, supplies and personnel over long distances (from a base in one country to a base in another country for example) using large cargo aircraft. This contrasts with tactical airlifts, which involves transporting the same above items within a theater of operations. This usually involves cargo planes with shorter ranges and slower speeds, but higher maneuverability.

== Communications ==
- Cryptography
- Homing pigeon/War pigeon
- Joint Army/Navy Phonetic Alphabet
- Message precedence
- Semaphore (communication)
- Signal Corps
- Smoke signal
- Telegraphy

=== Equipment ===
- Aldis lamp
- International maritime signal flags

== Land warfare ==
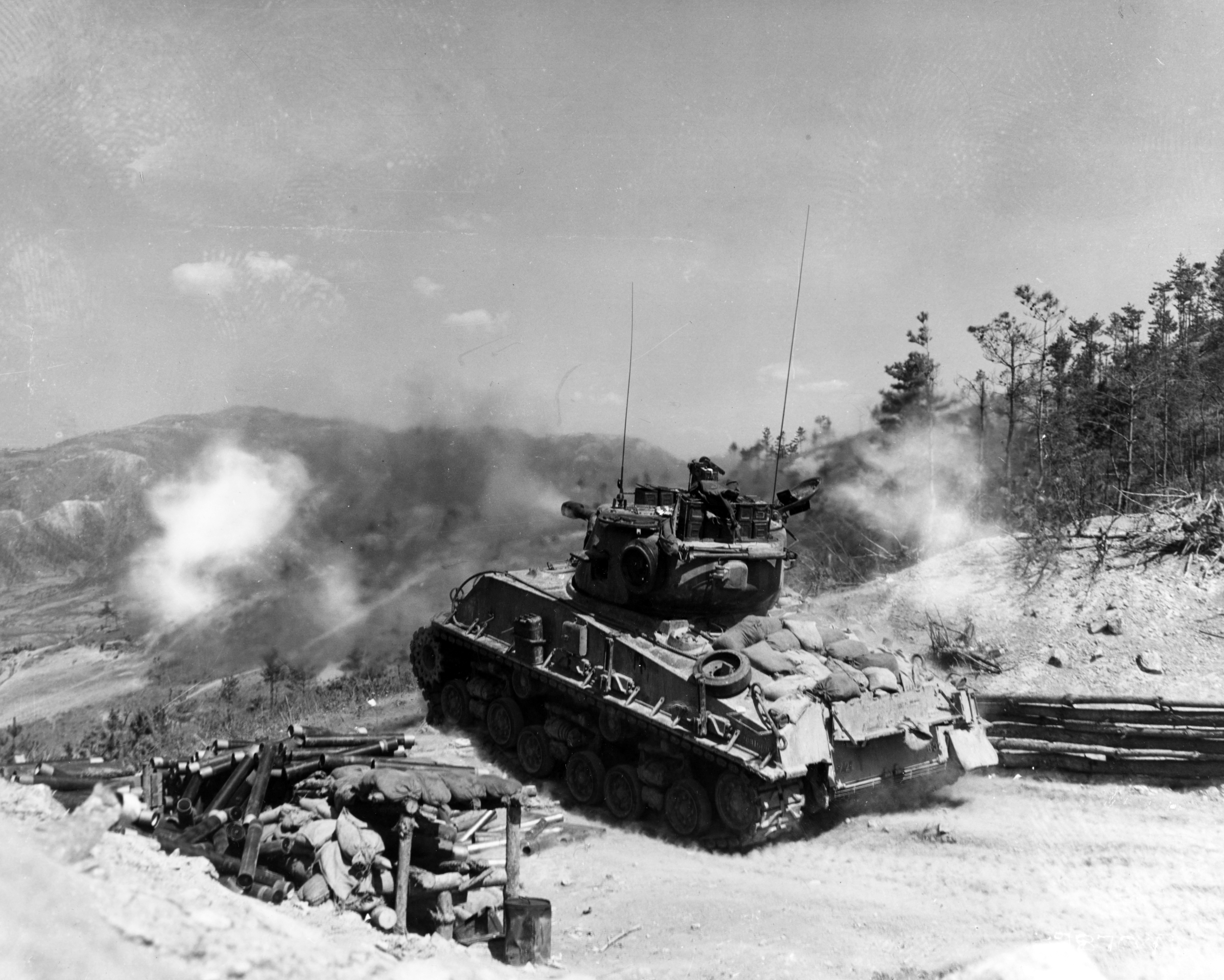
An American M4 Sherman in action during the Korean War.

Land warfare, as the name implies, takes place on land. The most common type of warfare, it can encompass several modes and locales, including urban, arctic, and mountain warfare.

The early part of the 19th century from 1815 to 1848 saw a long period of peace in Europe, accompanied by extraordinary industrial expansion. The industrial age brought about various technological advancements, each with their own implication. Land warfare moved from visual-range and semi person-to-person combat of the previous era, to indiscriminate and impersonal, "beyond visual range" warfare. The Crimean War (1853–1856) saw the introduction of trench warfare, long-range artillery, railroads, the telegraph, and the rifle. The mechanized mass-destruction of enemy combatants grew ever more deadly. In WWI (1914–1918) machine-guns, barbed wire, chemical weapons, and land-mines entered the battlefield. The deadly stalemated trench-warfare stage was finally passed with the advent of the modern armored tank late in WWI.

One major trend involved the transition away massed infantry fire and human waves to more refined tactics. This became possible with the superseding of earlier weapons like the highly inaccurate musket.

=== Technological advances ===
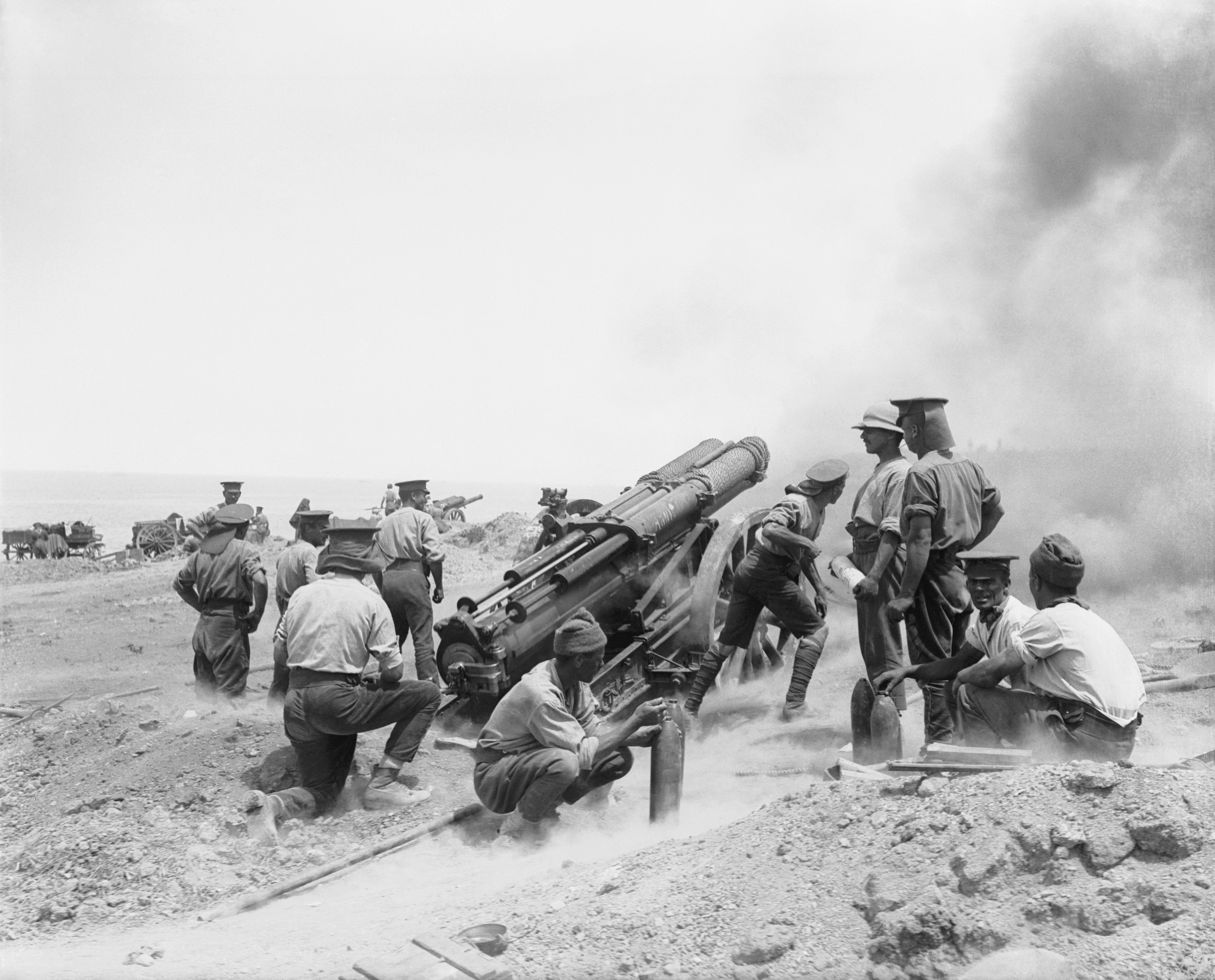
A British artillery piece in action during the Battle of Gallipoli, 1915.

Rifling refers to the act of adding spiral grooves to the inside of the barrel of a firearm. The grooves would cause a projectile to spin as it traveled down the barrel, improving range and accuracy. Once rifling became easier and practical, a new type of firearm was introduced, the rifle. It gave combatants the ability to specifically target an enemy combatant, rather than have large numbers of combatants fire in a general direction. It effectively broke up groups of combatants into smaller more maneuverable units.

Artillery are large guns designed to fire large projectiles a great distance. Early artillery pieces were large and cumbersome with slow rates of fire. This reduced their use to sieges, by both defenders and attackers. With the advent of the industrial age and various technological advancements, lighter, yet powerful and accurate artillery pieces were produced. This gave rise to field artillery which were used on a tactical level to support troops.

Machine guns are fully automatic guns. In this era of warfare they only existed as mounted support weapons, as automatic firearms were not yet developed. Early machine guns as invented by Richard Gatling, were hand cranked but evolved into truly automatic machine guns by Maxim at the end of the era. Machine guns were valued for their ability to smash infantry formations, especially attacking enemy formations when they were dense. This, along with effective field artillery, changed tactics drastically.

=== Static defense ===
Static defenses evolved from the use of permanent fortifications that were direct descendants of medieval castles. As artillery improved in destructive power and penetrative ability, more modern fortifications were developed, using first thicker layers of stone, then concrete and steel. After naval artillery developed the turret – a moving cannon platform – land fortifications started to use this method as well. Between the World Wars, France built an "impregnable" underground steel and concrete fortification that ran the length of the German-French border. This Maginot Line failed to stop German tanks in 1940: they bypassed the fortifications by invading through neighboring Belgium.

=== Temporary fortifications ===
As artillery and rifles allowed the killing of enemy personnel at a longer effective range, soldiers started to dig into temporary fortifications. These included massive trenches as used in WWI, and individual soldier-sized "fox holes" which became more common in WWII.

=== Maneuver warfare ===
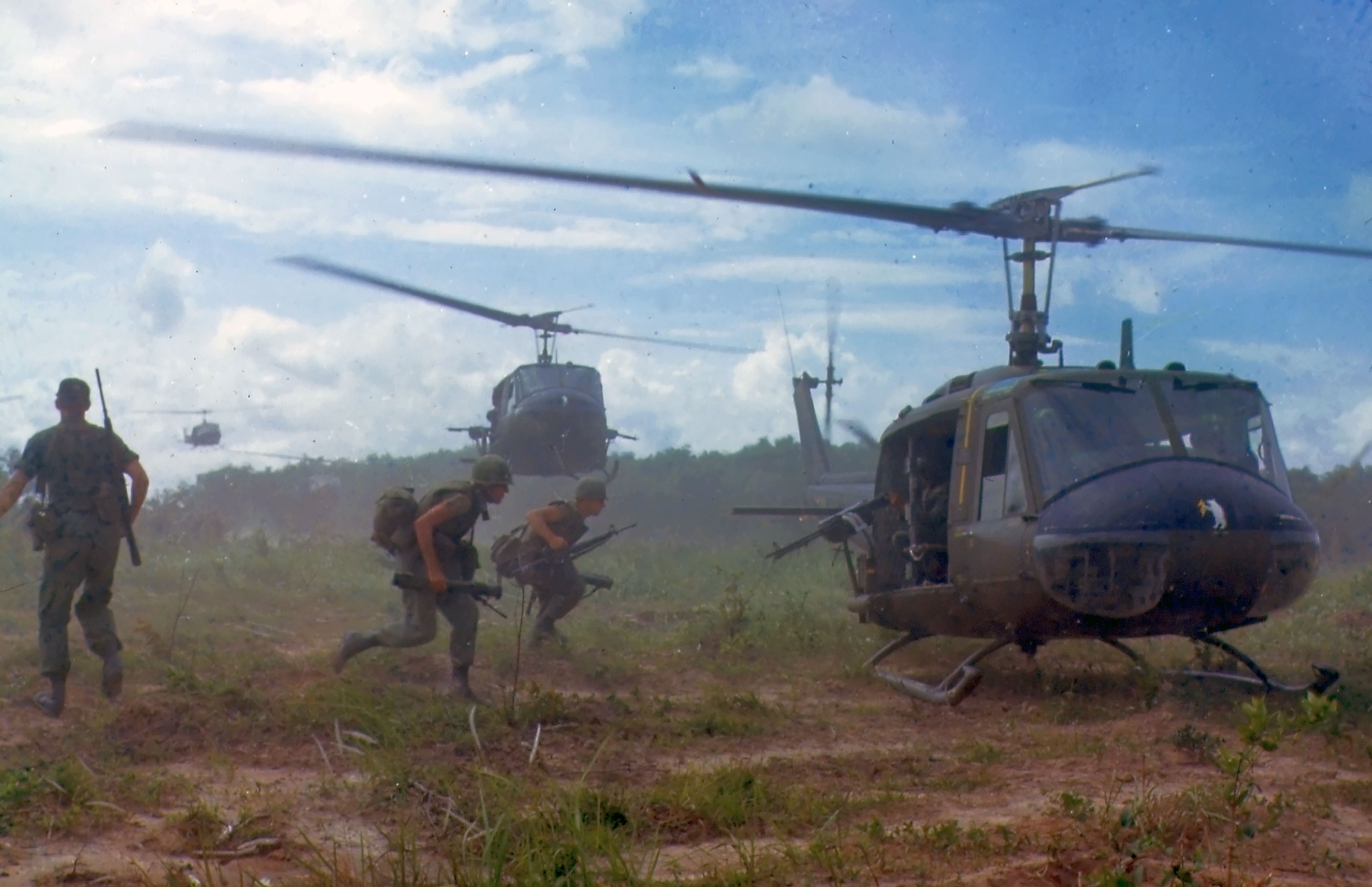
Starting in 1965, commanders could insert large forces behind enemy lines by helicopter.

Maneuver had existed throughout military history – from soldiers marching on the field to using horses in cavalry formations. It was not until the advent of mechanized transport over unprepared terrain, such as fields and deserts, using tanks and armored vehicles, that "maneuver warfare" became feasible. First used by the German army in Poland and France in WWII, Blitzkrieg or "lightning war" saw whole armies moved rapidly on tracked and armored fighting vehicles. During the war airborne movement was used, with soldiers dropped to the battlefield by parachute by both the Germans and the Allies. After WWII, developments in helicopters brought a more practical way to transport troops by air.

- Armoured warfare
- Blitzkrieg
- Deep operations

== Naval warfare ==
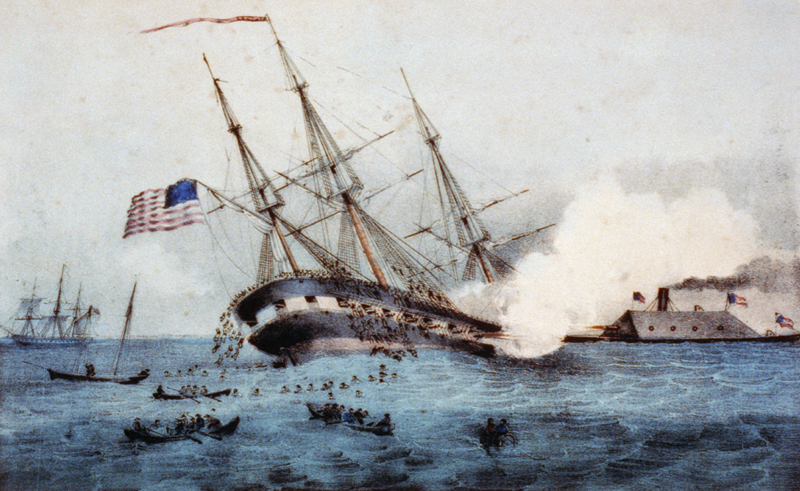
The sinking of the Cumberland by the Confederate ironclad Virginia in 1862 marked the beginning of the end for wooden warships.

=== Ironclads and Dreadnoughts ===
The period after the Napoleonic Wars was one of intensive experimentation with new technology; steam power for ships appeared in the 1810s, improved metallurgy and machining technique produced larger and deadlier guns, and the development of explosive shells, capable of demolishing a wooden ship at a single blow, in turn required the addition of iron armor, which led to ironclads.

The famous battle of the CSS Virginia and USS Monitor in the American Civil War was the duel of ironclads that symbolized the changing times. Although the battle was inconclusive, nations around the world subsequently raced to convert their fleets to iron, as ironclads had shown themselves to be clearly superior to wooden ships in their ability to withstand enemy fire.

In the late 19th century, naval warfare was revolutionized by Alfred Thayer Mahan's book The Influence of Sea Power upon History. Mahan argued that in the Anglo-French wars of the 18th and 19th centuries, domination of the sea was the deciding factor in the outcome, and therefore control of seaborne commerce was critical to military victory. Mahan argued that the best way to achieve naval domination was through large fleets of concentrated capital ships, as opposed to commerce raiders. His books were closely studied in all the Great Powers, influencing their naval arms race in the years prior to WWI.

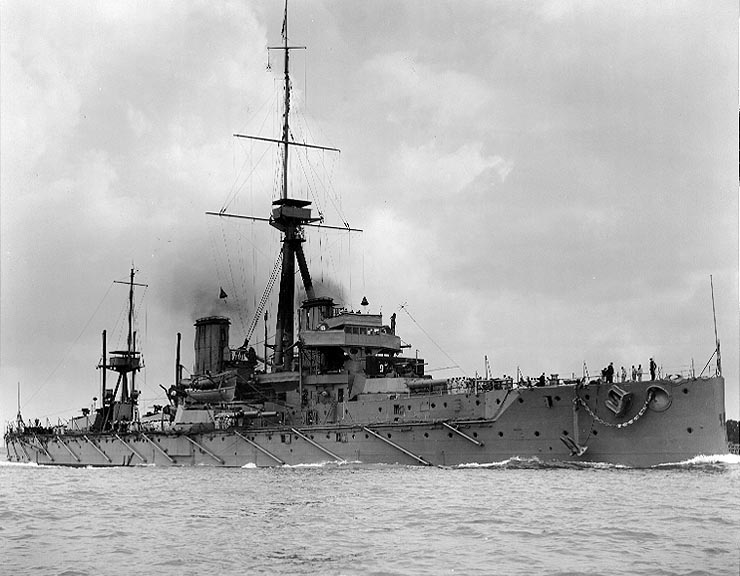
In 1906 the British warship HMS Dreadnought became the first warship to have both a uniform main battery and steam turbine engines, creating a standard for warships that lasted until the 1940s.

As the century came to a close, the familiar modern battleship began to emerge; a steel-armored ship, entirely dependent on steam turbines, and sporting a number of large shell guns mounted in turrets arranged along the centerline of the main deck. The ultimate design was reached in 1906 with HMS Dreadnought, which entirely dispensed with smaller guns, her main guns being sufficient to sink any existing ship of the time.

The Russo-Japanese War and particularly the Battle of Tsushima in 1905 was the first test of the new concepts, resulting in a stunning Japanese victory and the destruction of dozens of Russian ships. World War I pitted the old Royal Navy against the new navy of Imperial Germany, culminating in the 1916 Battle of Jutland. Following the war, many nations agreed to limit the size of their fleets in the Washington Naval Treaty and scrapped many of their battleships and cruisers.

Growing tensions of the 1930s restarted the building programs, with even larger ships than before: the Japanese battleship Yamato, launched in 1941, displaced 72,000 tons and mounted 18-inch (46 cm) guns. This marked the climax of "big gun" warfare, as aircraft would gradually play a larger role in warfare. By the 1960s, battleships had all-but vanished from the fleets of the world.

=== Aircraft carriers ===
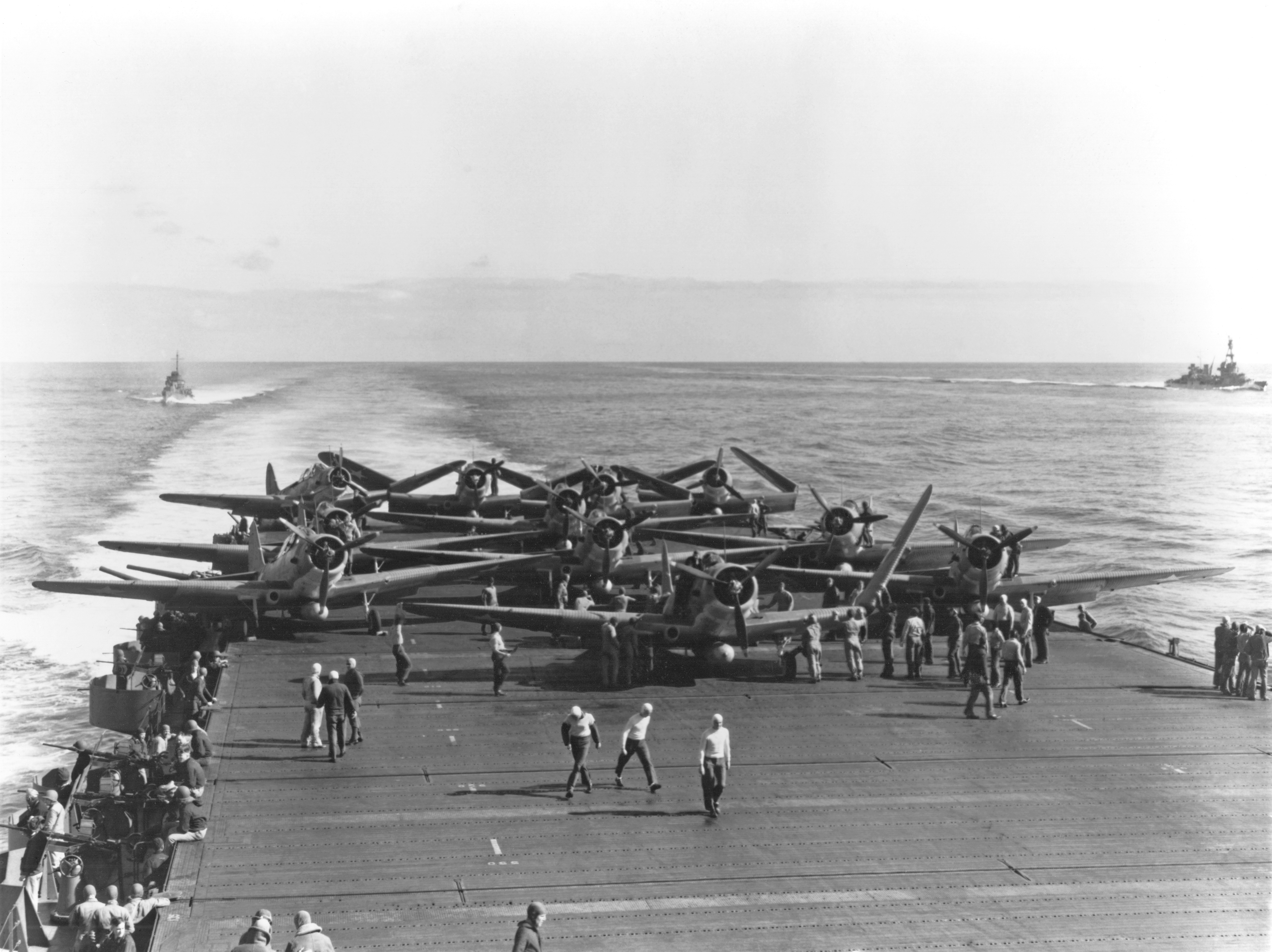
In the 1940s aircraft carriers supplanted battleships as the centerpiece of the fleet. Here, American torpedo bombers prepare to take off during the Battle of Midway in 1942.

Between the world wars, the first aircraft carriers appeared, initially as a way to circumvent the tonnage limits of the Washington Naval Treaty (many of the first carriers were converted battlecruisers). Though several ships had previously been designed to launch aircraft, the first true "flat-top" carrier was HMS Argus, launched in December 1917.

By the start of WWII, aircraft carriers typically carried three types of aircraft: torpedo bombers, which could also be used for conventional horizontal bombing and reconnaissance; dive bombers, also used for reconnaissance; and fighters for fleet defence and bomber escort duties. Because of the restricted space on aircraft carriers, these aircraft were almost always small, single-engined warplanes. The first true demonstration of naval air power was the victory of the Royal Navy at the Battle of Taranto in 1940, which set the stage for Japan's much larger and more famous attack on Pearl Harbor the following year.

Two days after Pearl Harbor, the sinking of HMS Prince of Wales and HMS Repulse, marked the beginning of the end for the battleship era. Following WWII, aircraft carriers continued to remain key to navies throughout the latter 20th century, moving in the 1950s to jets launched from Supercarriers, behemoths which could displace as much as 100,000 tons.

=== Submarines ===
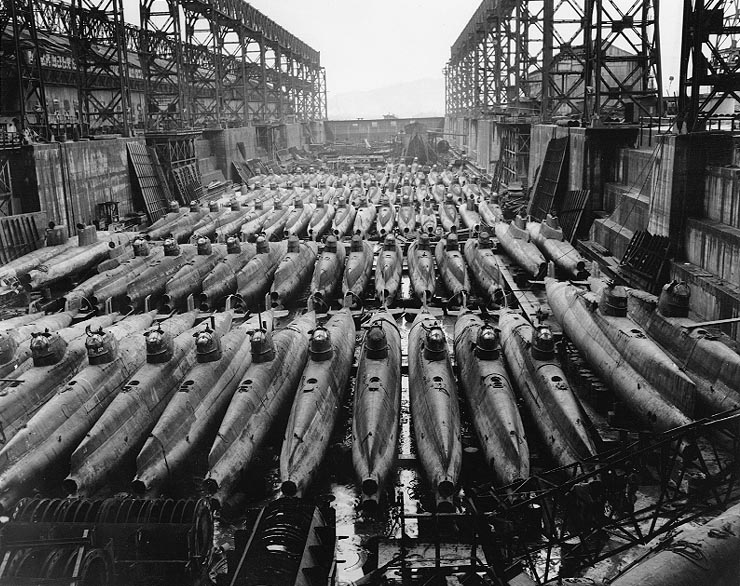
Some 80 Japanese Type D ("Koryu") midget submarines in a dry dock at Kure, October 19, 1945

Just as important was the development of submarines to travel underneath the sea, at first for short dives, then later to be able to spend weeks or months underwater powered by a nuclear reactor. The first successful submarine attack in wartime was in 1864 by the Confederate submarine H.L. Hunley which sank the frigate USS Housatonic.

In both World Wars, submarines primarily exerted their power by sinking merchant ships using torpedoes, in addition to attacks on warships. All nations practiced unrestricted submarine warfare in which submarines sank merchant ships without warning, but the only successful campaign during this period was America's submarine war against Japan during the Pacific War. In the 1950s the Cold War inspired the development of ballistic missile submarines, each one loaded with dozens of nuclear-armed missiles and with orders to launch them from sea should the other nation attack.

== Aerial warfare ==
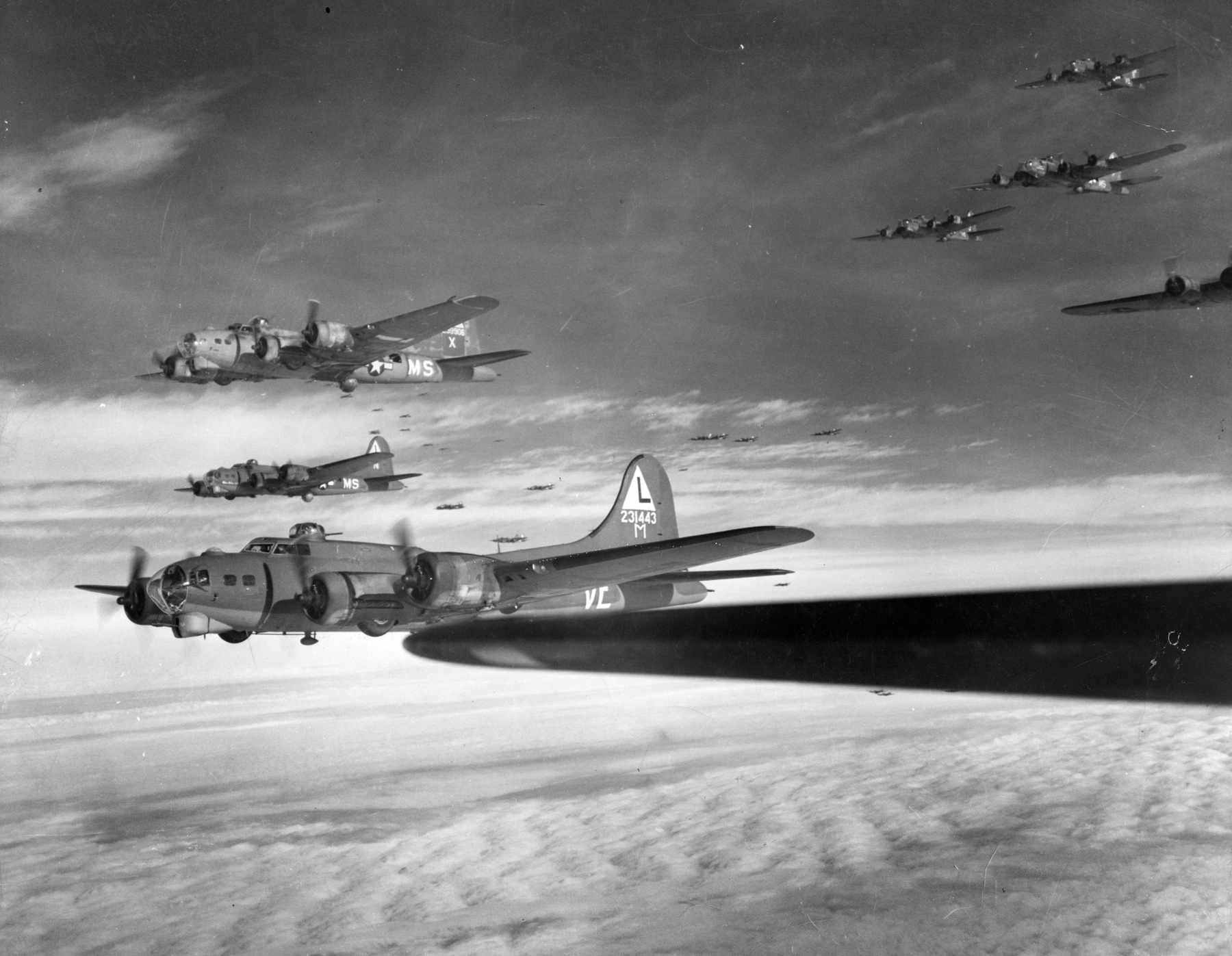
Boeing B-17 Flying Fortress bombers flying in a large attack formation

The first use of airplanes in war was the Italo-Turkish War of 1911, when the Italians carried out several reconnaissance and bombing missions. During WWI both sides made use of balloons and airplanes for reconnaissance and directing artillery fire. To prevent enemy reconnaissance, some airplane pilots began attacking other airplanes and balloons, first with small arms carried in the cockpit, and later with machine guns mounted on the aircraft. Both sides also made use of aircraft for bombing, strafing and dropping of propaganda leaflets.

The German air force carried out the first terror bombing raids, using Zeppelins to drop bombs on Britain. By the end of the war airplanes had become specialised into bombers, fighters, and surveillance aircraft. Most of these airplanes were biplanes with wooden frames, canvas skins, wire rigging and air-cooled engines.

Between 1918 and 1939, aircraft technology developed very rapidly. By 1939 military biplanes were in the process of being replaced with metal framed monoplanes, often with stressed skins and liquid cooled engines. Top speeds had tripled; altitudes doubled (and oxygen masks become commonplace); ranges and payloads of bombers increased enormously.

Some theorists, most famously Hugh Trenchard and Giulio Douhet, believed that aircraft would become the dominant military arm in the future, and argued that future wars would be won entirely by the destruction of the enemy's military and industrial capability from the air. This concept was called strategic bombing. Douhet also argued in The Command of the Air (1921) that future military leaders could avoid falling into bloody World War I-style trench stalemates by using aviation to strike past the enemy's forces directly at their vulnerable civilian population, which Douhet believed would cause these populations to rise up in revolt to stop the bombing.

Others, such as Billy Mitchell, saw the potential of air power to neutralize the striking power of naval surface fleets. Mitchell himself proved the vulnerability of capital ships to aircraft was finally in 1921 when he commanded a squadron of bombers that sank the ex-German battleship SMS Ostfriesland with aerial bombs. (See Industrial warfare#Naval warfare)

During WWII, there was a debate between strategic bombing and tactical bombing. Strategic bombing focused on targets such as factories, railroads, oil refineries, and heavily populated areas such as cities and towns, and required heavy four-engine bombers carrying large payloads of ordnance or a single heavy four-engine bomber carrying a nuclear weapon flying deep into enemy territory. Tactical bombing focused on concentration of combatants, command and control centers, airfields, and ammunition dumps, and required attack aircraft, dive bombers, and fighter bombers that could fly low over the battlefield.

In the early years of WWII, the German Luftwaffe focused on tactical bombing, using large numbers of Ju 87 Stukas as "flying artillery" for land offensives. Artillery was slow and required time to set up a firing position, whereas aircraft were better able keep up with the fast advances of the German panzer columns. Close air support greatly assisted in the successes of the German Army in the Battle of France. It was also important in amphibious warfare, where aircraft carriers could provide support for soldiers landing on the beaches.

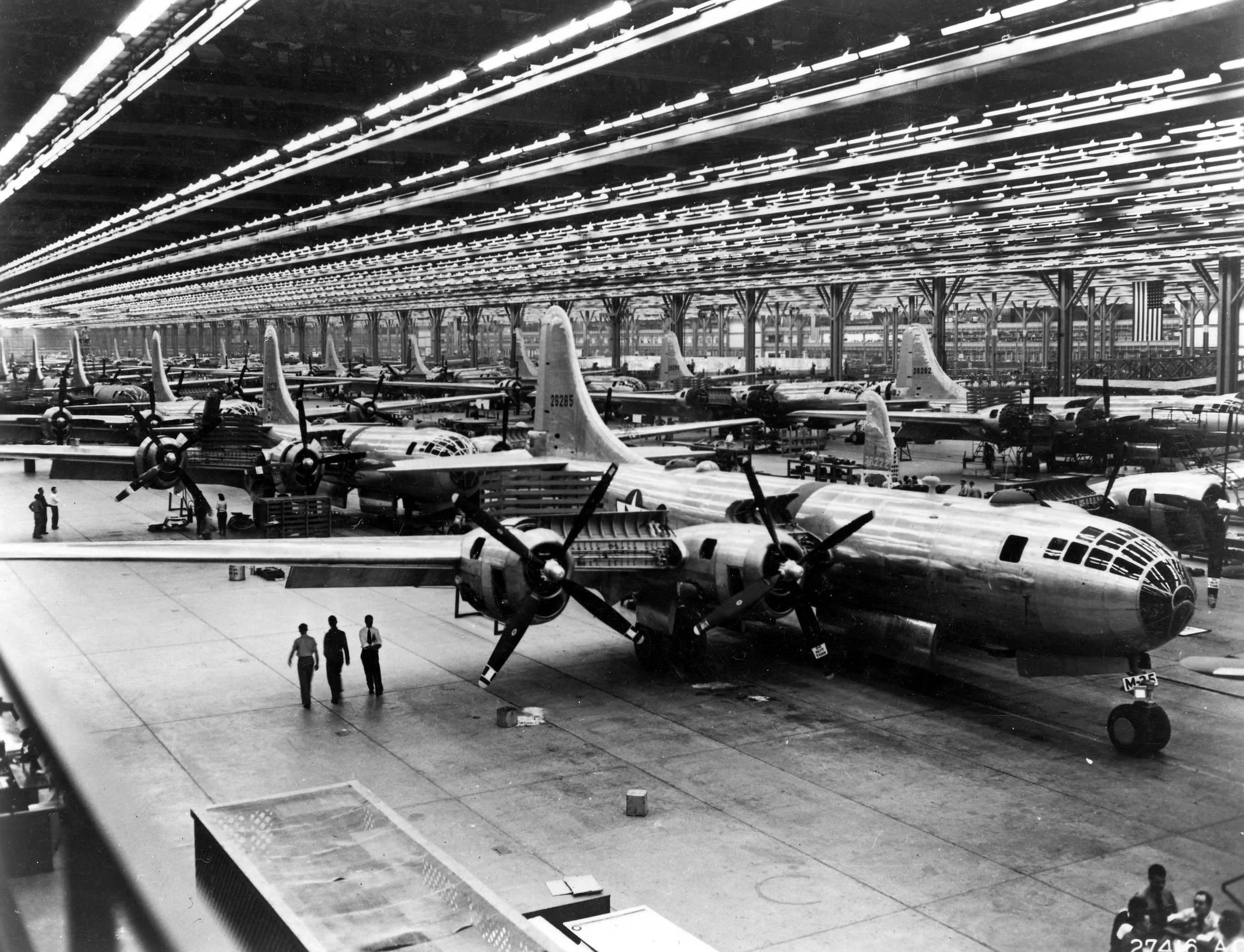
Boeing B-29 Superfortress bombers under construction on an assembly line

Strategic bombing, by contrast, was unlike anything the world has seen before or since. In 1940, the Germans attempted to force Britain to surrender through attacks on its airfields and factories, and then on its cities in The Blitz in what became the Battle of Britain, the first major battle whose outcome was determined primarily in the air. The campaigns conducted in Europe and Asia could involve thousands of aircraft dropping tens of thousands of tons of munitions over a single city.

Military aviation in the post-war years was dominated by the needs of the Cold War. The postwar years saw a rapid conversion to jet power, which resulted in enormous increases in speeds and altitudes of aircraft. Until the advent of the intercontinental ballistic missile, major powers relied on high-altitude bombers to deliver their newly developed nuclear deterrent. Each country strove to develop the technology of bombers and the high-altitude fighters that could intercept them. The concept of air superiority began to play a heavy role in aircraft designs for both the United States and the Soviet Union.

== Post-World War II ==
With the invention of nuclear weapons, the concept of full-scale war carries the prospect of global annihilation, and as such conflicts since WWII have been "low intensity" conflicts, typically in the form of proxy wars fought within local regional confines, using what are now referred to as "conventional weapons", typically combined with the use of asymmetric warfare tactics and applied use of intelligence.

=== Nuclear warfare ===
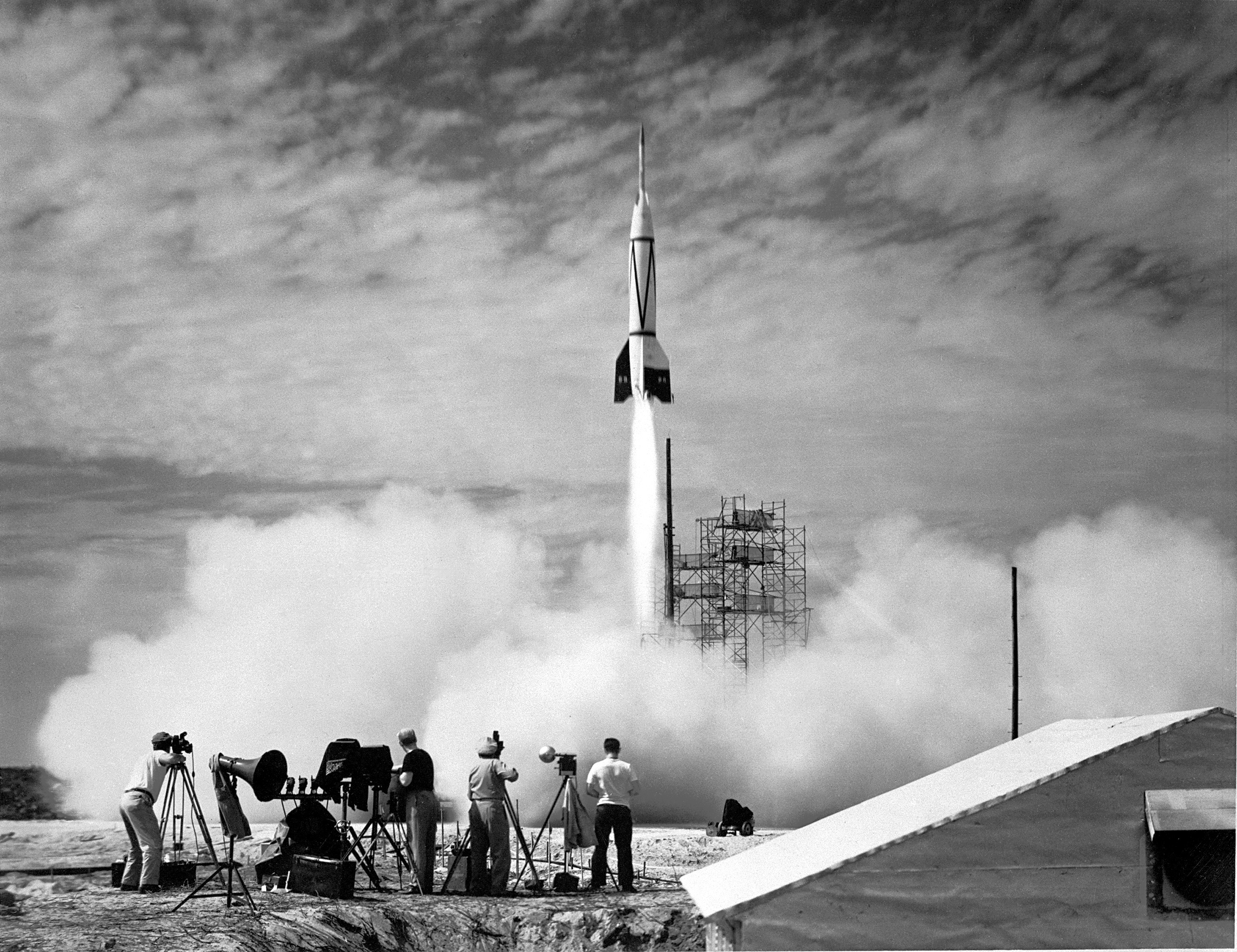
US test launch of a German V-2 ballistic missile.

The use of nuclear weapons first came into being during the last months of WWII, with the dropping of atomic bombs on Hiroshima and Nagasaki. This was the only use of nuclear weapons in combat. For a decade after World War II, the United States and later the Soviet Union (and to a lesser extent the United Kingdom and France) developed and maintained a strategic force of bombers that would be able to attack any potential aggressor from bases inside their countries.

Before the development of a capable strategic missile force in the Soviet Union, much of the war-fighting doctrine held by western nations revolved around the use of a large number of smaller nuclear weapons used in a tactical role. It is arguable if such use could be considered "limited" however, because it was believed that the US would use their own strategic weapons (mainly bombers at the time) should the USSR deploy any kind of nuclear weapon against civilian targets.

A revolution in thinking occurred with the introduction of the intercontinental ballistic missile (ICBM), which the Soviet Union first successfully tested in the late 1950s. To deliver a warhead to a target, a missile was far less expensive than a bomber that could do the same job. Moreover, at the time it was impossible to intercept ICBMs due to their high altitude and speed.

In the 1960s, another major shift in nuclear doctrine occurred with the development of the submarine-based nuclear missile (SLBM). It was hailed by military theorists as a weapon that would assure a surprise attack would not destroy the capability to retaliate, and therefore would make nuclear war less likely.

=== Cold War ===
Since the end of WWII, no industrial nations have fought such a large, decisive war, due to the availability of weapons that are so destructive that their use would offset the advantages of victory. The fighting of a total war where nuclear weapons are used is something that instead of taking years and the full mobilisation of a country's resources such as in WWII, would take tens of minutes. Such weapons are developed and maintained with relatively modest peace time defence budgets.

By the end of the 1950s, the ideological stand-off of the Cold War between the Western World and the Soviet Union involved thousands of nuclear weapons being aimed at each side by the other. Strategically, the equal balance of destructive power possessed by each side situation came to be known as Mutually Assured Destruction (MAD), the idea that a nuclear attack by one superpower would result in nuclear counter-strike by the other. This would result in hundreds of millions of deaths in a world where, in words widely attributed to Nikita Khrushchev, "The living will envy the dead".

During the Cold War, the superpowers sought to avoid open conflict between their respective forces, as both sides recognized that such a clash could very easily escalate, and quickly involve nuclear weapons. Instead, the superpowers fought each other through their involvement in proxy wars, military buildups, and diplomatic standoffs.

In the case of proxy wars, each superpower supported its respective allies in conflicts with forces aligned with the other superpower, such as in the Korean War, the Vietnam War, and the Soviet invasion of Afghanistan.

Non nuclear nations still fought industrialized warfare as the long Iran–Iraq War that ended in a trench warfare stalemate.

=== 21st century ===
The Royal United Services Institute stated that the Russo-Ukrainian War has proven that the age of industrial warfare is still here and that massive consumption of equipment, vehicles and ammunition requires a large industrial base for resupply.

== Milestones ==
Year	Battle	Country	Significance
1854–1855	Siege of Sevastopol	United Kingdom	First use of the telegraph in combat.
1859	Austro-Sardinian War	France	First major use of railroads at the strategic level.
1861	First Battle of Bull Run	CSA	First battle in which railroads play a decisive role.
1862	Battle of Hampton Roads	CSA USA	First fight between two powered iron-covered warships.
1864–1865	Siege of Petersburg	CSA USA	First example of modern trench warfare.
1898	Spanish–American War	Spain USA	Extensive use of steel battleships in naval conflict.
1905	Battle of Tsushima	Russia Japan	Decisive battle between steel-covered warships.
1911–1912	Italo-Turkish War	Italy	First use of airplanes in combat.
1914	First Battle of the Marne	France	First large-scale use of motorised infantry.
1914–1918	First Battle of the Atlantic	Germany	First major campaign of submarine warfare.
1915	Second Battle of Ypres	Germany	First large-scale use of chemical weapons in battle.
1916	Battle of Verdun	France Germany	High point of fixed fortification warfare.
1917	Battle of Cambrai	United Kingdom	First successful use of massed tanks in combat.
1925	Rif War	France Spain	First modern amphibious assault using tanks and aircraft.
1937	Bombing of Guernica	Germany Italy	First major use of terror bombing.
1937	Battle of El Mazuco	Spain Germany	First major use of carpet bombing against a military target.
1940	Battle of Britain	Germany United Kingdom	First major battle to be fought entirely in the air.
1940	Battle of Taranto	United Kingdom	First naval battle in which one side only employed aircraft.
1941	Battle of Crete	Germany	First major battle in which one side only employed airborne forces.
1941	Operation Barbarossa	Germany Soviet Union	High point of Blitzkrieg warfare. Largest invasion in history.
1942	Battle of the Coral Sea	Japan United States	First naval battle in which neither side's ships sighted or fired directly upon each other.
1942	Battle of Midway	Japan United States	Decisive battle between aircraft carriers.
1942	Battle of Stalingrad	Germany Soviet Union	Largest single battle in history. Decisive battle of the Nazi-Soviet War.
1942	Battle of Guadalcanal	Japan United States	First major air-land-sea campaign in history.
1943	Battle of Kursk	Germany Soviet Union	Largest tank battle in history.
1944	Normandy Invasion	United Kingdom United States Canada	Largest seaborne invasion in history.
1944	Battle of Leyte Gulf	Japan United States	Largest naval battle in history.

== See also ==
- Mobilization
- Trench warfare
- Unconditional surrender
- World war

Material aspects:

- Arms race
- Economic warfare
- Home front
- Mass production
- Total war
- War economy
- War effort

Specific:

- Cold War
- Curtis LeMay
- Technology during World War I
- Technology during World War II
- Unrestricted Warfare (China)
