= Electoral history of David Paterson =

List of elections featuring David Paterson as a candidate

David Paterson has served in the New York State Senate, as Lieutenant Governor of New York, and as Governor of New York. This page contains information on his electoral history.

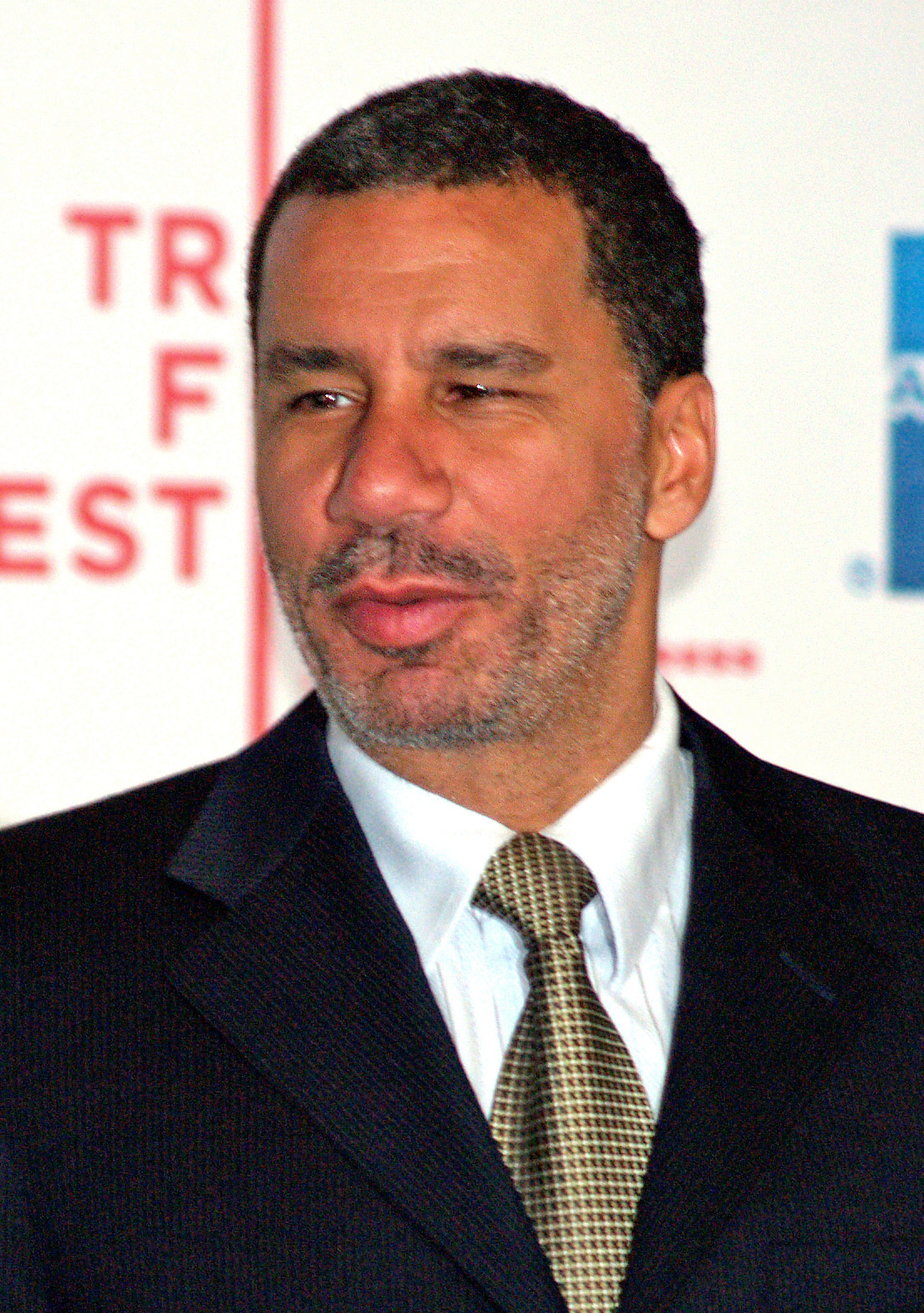
David Paterson at the 2008 Tribeca Film Festival

Statewide tickets on which Paterson has run
Year	Party	Governor	Lieutenant Governor	Comptroller	Attorney General	U.S. Senate
2006	Democratic	Eliot Spitzer	David Paterson	Alan Hevesi	Andrew Cuomo	Hillary Clinton
2006	Independence	Eliot Spitzer	David Paterson	Alan Hevesi	Jeanine Pirro	Hillary Rodham Clinton
2006	Working Families	Eliot Spitzer	David Paterson	Alan Hevesi	Andrew Cuomo	Hillary Rodham Clinton

== 2006 ==
2006 New York gubernatorial election
Party	Candidate	Votes	%	±%
Democratic	Eliot Spitzer David Paterson	2,882,524	69.0%	
Republican	John Faso C. Scott Vanderhoef	1,217,516	29.2%	
Green	Malachy McCourt Alison Duncan	40,729	1.0%	

== 2004 ==
Election results, New York State Senate, 30th District, 2004
Party	Candidate	Votes	%	±%
Democratic	David Paterson (I)	79,494	93.1%	
Republican	Alphonzo Mosley	5,945	6.9%	

- Mosley also ran on the Conservative line.

== 2002 ==
Election results, New York State Senate, 30th District, 2002
Party	Candidate	Votes	%	±%
Democratic	David Paterson (I)	49,852	91.8%	
Republican	Alphonzo Mosley	3,887	7.2%	

- Mosley also ran on the Conservative and Independence party lines.
- Paterson also ran on the Liberal and Working Families party lines.

== 2000 ==
Election results, New York State Senate, 29th District, 2000
Party	Candidate	Votes	%	±%
Democratic	David Paterson (I)	77,853	96.0%	
Republican	Alphonzo Mosley	3,252	4.0%	

- Mosley also ran on the Reform Party line.
- Paterson also ran on the Liberal and Working Families party lines.

== 1998 ==
Election results, New York State Senate, 29th District, 1998
Party	Candidate	Votes	%	±%
Democratic	David Paterson (I)	52,344	96.5%	
Republican	Zelda S. Owens	1,908	3.5%	

- Paterson also ran on the Liberal party line.

== 1996 ==
Election results, New York State Senate, 29th District, 1996
Party	Candidate	Votes	%	±%
Democratic	David Paterson (I)	55,849	97.0%	
Independence	Alphonzo Mosley	1,864	3.0%	

- Paterson also ran on the Liberal party line.

== 1994 ==
Election results, New York State Senate, 29th District, 1994
Party	Candidate	Votes	%	±%
Democratic	David Paterson (I)			

== 1993 ==
New York City Public Advocate, 1993 – Democratic Primary
Candidate		Votes	%	±
✓	Consumer Affairs Commissioner Mark Green		45	
	Harlem State Senator David Paterson		19	
	Bronx City Councilwoman Susan D. Alter		14	
	Bronx State Assemblyman Roberto Ramirez		12	
	Brooklyn State Senator Donald Halperin		8	
	Transit PBA President Ronald W. Reale		2	
Turnout				

- Alter also held the Republican and Liberal party designations
- Reale also held the Conservative party designation
- Percentages from THE 1993 PRIMARY: Public Advocate; Green Scores Big Victory Over His Five Opponents in The New York Times on September 15, 1993

== 1992 ==
Election results, New York State Senate, 29th District, 1992
Party	Candidate	Votes	%	±%
Democratic	David Paterson (I)			
Republican	John L. Wood			

== 1990 ==
Election results, New York State Senate, 29th District, 1990
Party	Candidate	Votes	%	±%
Democratic	David Paterson (I)			

== 1988 ==
Election results, New York State Senate, 29th District, 1988
Party	Candidate	Votes	%	±%
Democratic	David Paterson (I)	67,961	90.3%	
Republican	Ernest Mabry	6,588	8.7%	
Conservative	John T. Gatto	787	1.0%	

- Paterson also ran on the Liberal party line.

== 1986 ==
Election results, New York State Senate, 29th District, 1986
Party	Candidate	Votes	%	±%
Democratic	David Paterson (I)			
Liberal	Galen Kirkland			

New York State Senate, 29th District, 1986 – Democratic Primary
Candidate		Votes	%	±
✓	David Paterson (I)			
	Tenant Activist Galen Kirkland			
	Community Board Member Philip H. P. Reed			

- Kirkland also held the Liberal Party designation.

== 1985 ==
Special election results, New York State Senate, 29th District, 1985
Party	Candidate	Votes	%	±%
Democratic	David Paterson (I)	22,284	69.4%	
Liberal	Galen Kirkland	6,126	19.1%	
Republican	Joseph Holland	3,266	10.2%	
Conservative	John T. Gatto	422	1.3%	

New York State Senate, 29th District Special Election, 1985 – Democratic Nominating convention
Candidate		Votes	%	±
✓	David Paterson	376	58%	
	Tenant Activist Galen Kirkland	272	42%	

== Works ==
- Paterson, David Black, Blind, & In Charge: A Story of Visionary Leadership and Overcoming Adversity. New York, New York, 2020
