= Brian Stoltz =

American organic chemist

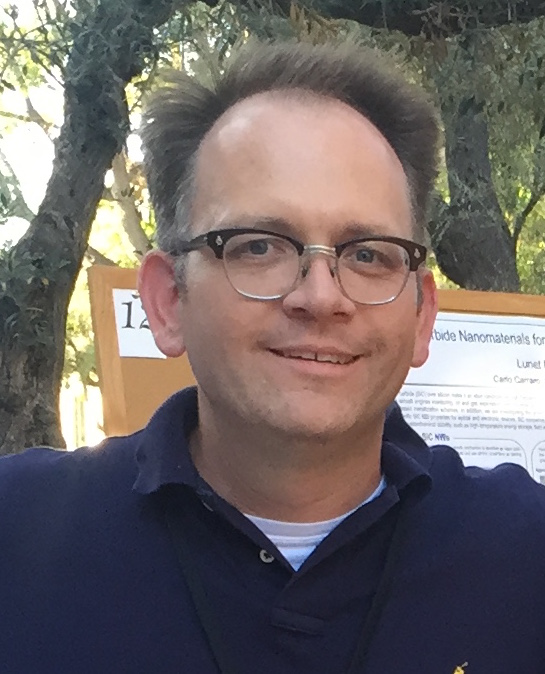
- Born: Brian M. Stoltz; November 12, 1970 (age 55)
- Education: Indiana University of Pennsylvania (B.S., 1993); Yale (Ph.D., 1997)
- Awards: Fellow of the American Association for the Advancement of Science
- Scientific career
- Fields: Chemistry
- Workplaces: California Institute of Technology
- Doctoral advisor: John L. Wood
- Other academic advisors: E. J. Corey
- Doctoral students: Neil Garg; Hosea Nelson; Jennifer Roizen
- Website: www.cce.caltech.edu/content/brian-m-stoltz

Brian M. Stoltz is currently a professor of chemistry at the California Institute of Technology. The primary focus of his research is chemical synthesis with an emphasis on developing allylic alkylation reactions for the preparation of complex molecules possessing unique structural, biological, and physical properties. His research involves the total synthesis of natural products such as dragmacidin F and (–)-cyanthiwigin F, and development of synthetic reactions to access quaternary stereocenters. Specifically, he has focused on the allylic alkylation of enolates, developing an enantioselective variant in 2004.

== Education ==
Stoltz received undergraduate degrees in Chemistry and German from Indiana University of Pennsylvania in 1993. As an undergraduate he spent a year abroad at LMU Munich. He went on to earn his M.S. and Ph.D. at Yale University, where he studied organic chemistry under the supervision of John L. Wood, completing his studies in 1997. Upon completion of his graduate work, he held an NIH post-doctoral fellowship appointment in the laboratory of E. J. Corey at Harvard University from 1998 to 2000.

== Career and research ==
Stoltz began his independent career at Caltech in 2000. He was promoted to Associate Professor in 2006 and then to Full Professor in 2007. His laboratory is well-known for their achievements in total synthesis and methods development. Some of the achievements from his lab included the syntheses of cylandrocyclophane, jorunnamycin A, and cyanthawigin F. His lab also solved long-standing challenges, such as completing the synthesis of 2-quinuclidonium tetrafluoroborate. Stoltz is a leader in organometallic chemistry and has developed numerous methods, especially allylic alkylation chemistry. He is the Editor-in-Chief of Tetrahedron. At present he is also an associate editor for the Beilstein Journal of Organic Chemistry.

=== Awards and honors ===
- American Chemical Society, Ernest Guenther Award in the Chemistry of Natural Products (2026)
- American Chemical Society, Herbert C. Brown Award for Creative Research in Synthetic Methods (2025)
- Fellow of the American Chemical Society (2019)
- American Chemical Society, Award for Creative Work in Synthetic Organic Chemistry (2018)
- Richard P. Feynman Prize for Excellence in Teaching, California Institute of Technology (2017)
- Mukaiyama Award (2015)
- Tetrahedron Young Investigator Award (2010)
- Sackler Prize (2009)
- American Chemical Society, E. J. Corey Award (2009)
- American Association for the Advancement of Science (2006)
- National Science Foundation Presidential Early Career Award for Scientists and Engineers (2002)
