= 5th Helicopter Squadron =

VIP Helicopter Squadron of the US Air Force base in the National Capital Region

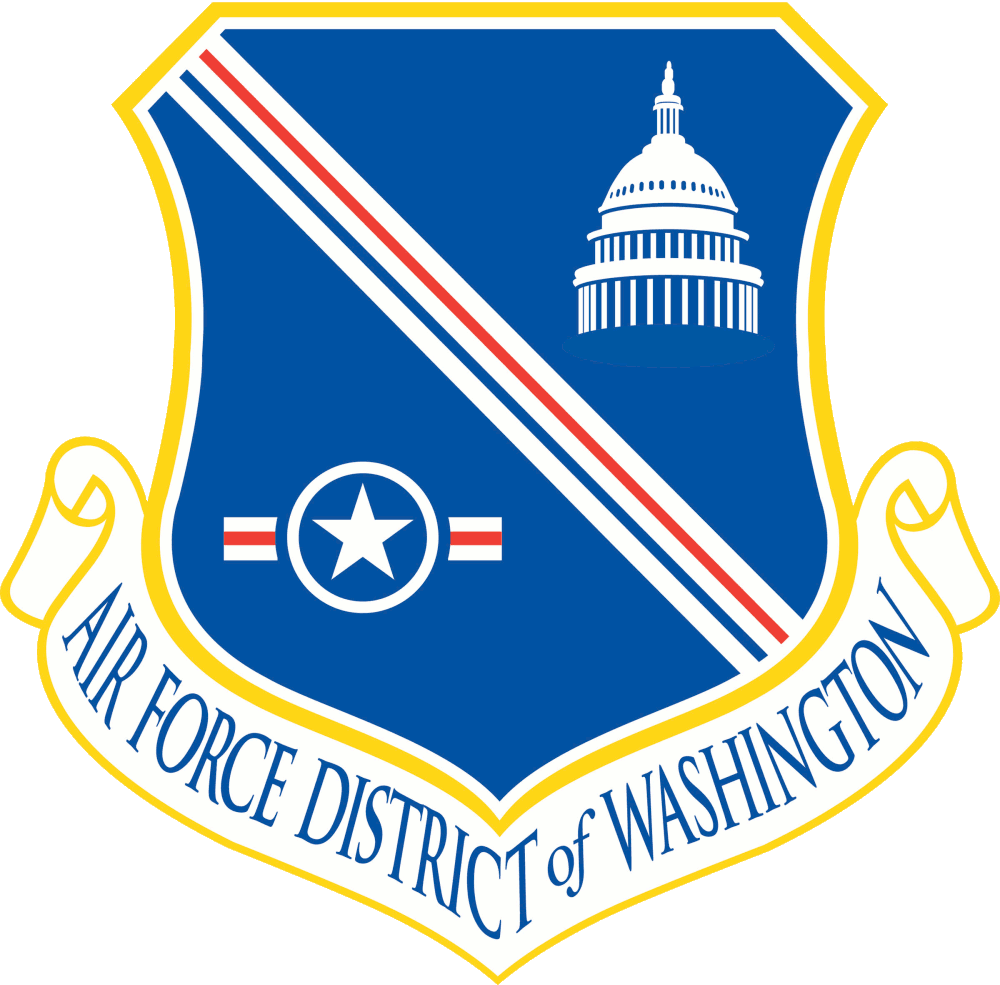
5th Helicopter Squadron

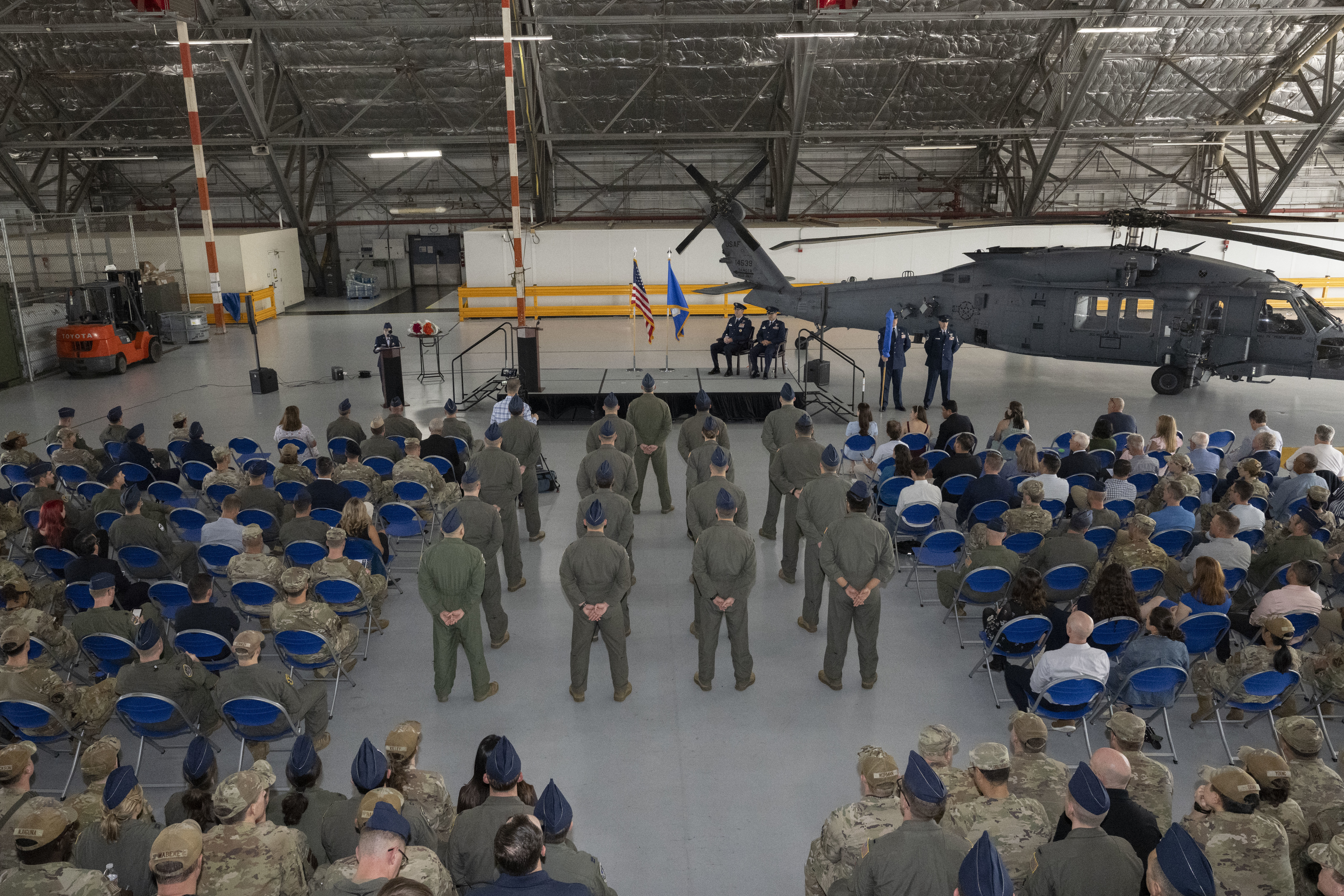
- Sikorsky HH-60W at the squadron's activation ceremony (Note: Aircraft is Sikorsky HH-60W Jolly Green II, serial 22-14539.)
- Active: 1944–1956; 2026–present
- Country: United States
- Branch: United States Air Force
- Role: Helicopter Airlift
- Part of: Air Force District of Washington
- Garrison/HQ: Joint Base Andrews
- Nickname: Shepherd of the Seas (1945)
- Engagements: European Theater of Operations

Insignia
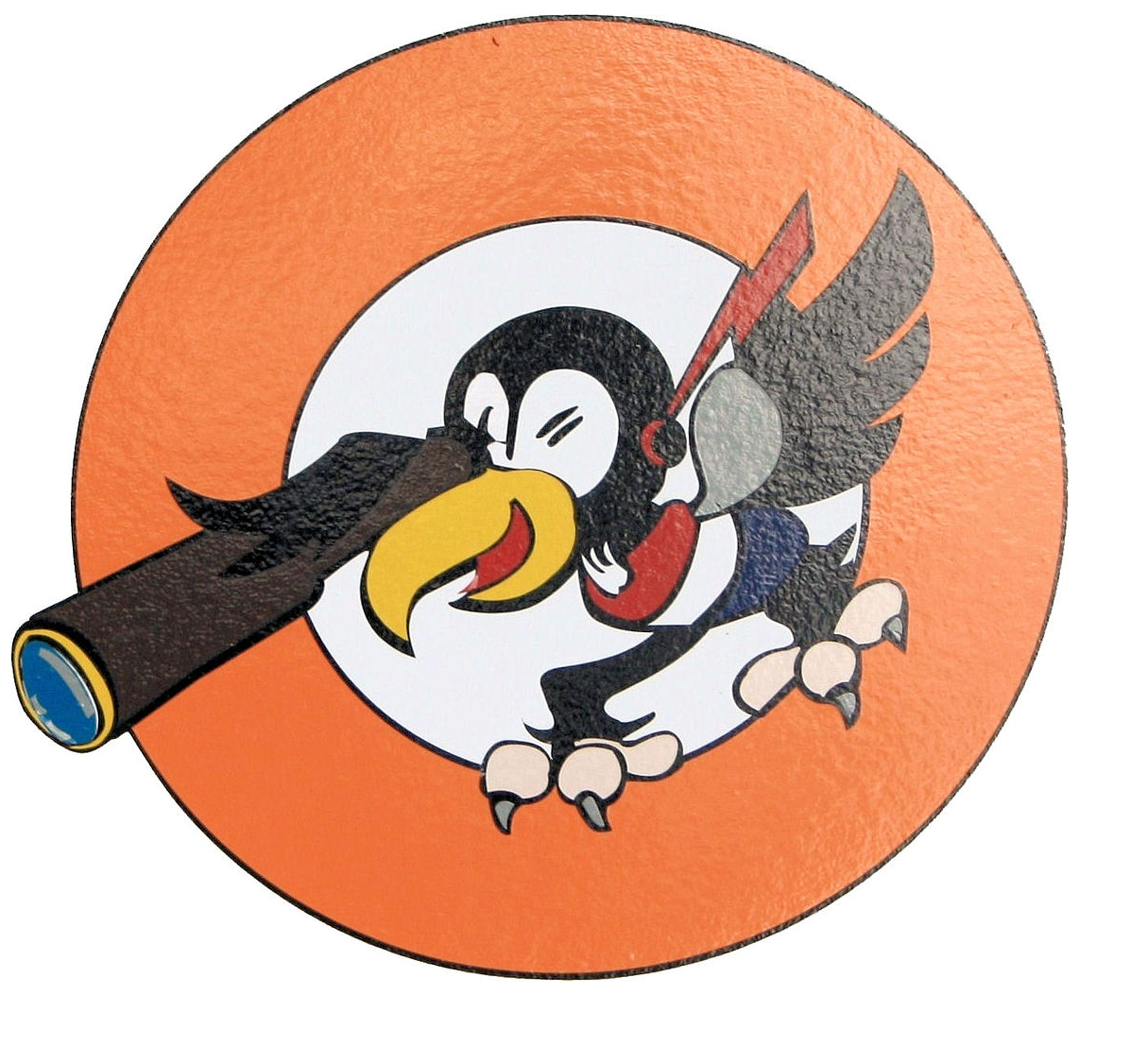
- 5th Emergency Rescue Squadron emblem
- World War II fuselage code (Note: This code was carried only on the squadron's P-47s. Its OA-10s did not carry codes, and the B-17 detached from the 457th Bombardment Group retained its assigned unit marking.): 5F

Aircraft flown
- Helicopter: HH-60W Jolly Green II

The 5th Helicopter Squadron is a United States Air Force unit stationed at Joint Base Andrews, Maryland and assigned to the 316th Operations Group.

The squadron was first organized as the 5th Emergency Rescue Squadron. It served in the European Theater of Operations, moving to the United States following V-E Day. The squadron trained search and rescue aircrews, then controlled Air Force search and rescue operations in the eastern United States. In 1952, the squadron was expanded as the 5th Air Rescue Group with squadrons stationed at various bases. In 1956, rescue operations were reduced and the group was inactivated and its squadrons assigned directly to Air Rescue Service. It was reactivated in its current role in September 2026.

== Mission ==
The 5th Helicopter Squadron will operate Sikorsky HH-60W Jolly Green IIs in a specialized configuration, including to the main cabin seating arrangement, communications suite, and defensive capabilities, to take on the tasks of transporting VIPs around the National Capital Region and supporting continuity of government plans by evacuating senior officials and lawmakers to safety to ensure the continued functioning of federal authorities following an attack or a similarly serious contingency.

== History ==
=== World War II ===
Squadron P-47D Thunderbolt

In May 1944, Eighth Air Force acted to augment the air-sea rescue forces of the Royal Air Force in the North Sea and English Channel. In early May 1944, it organized Detachment B of the 64th Fighter Wing at RAF Boxted. It equipped the detachment with "war weary" Republic P-47D Thunderbolts drawn from units of VIII Fighter Command. Its personnel were not permanently assigned, but were on detached service from other units. Its mission was to act as spotters for downed aircrew. The Thunderbolts carried a belly container with two dinghies and also smoke markers. The position of the smoke markers caused control problems, so they were relocated and the dinghies were carried in separate underwing containers. Two P-47s were kept in the air whenever a bomber mission was launched. The Thunderbolts retained their armament, and one detachment pilot was credited with the destruction of a V-1 flying bomb over the English Channel.

Squadron OA-10 Catalina

On 26 January 1945, the detachment, which had moved to RAF Halesworth earlier that month was replaced by the 5th Emergency Rescue Squadron, which took over its 13 P-47s. The move was necessitated because Boxted could not accommodate the six Consolidated OA-10 Catalinas that were added to the new squadron's strength. Under favorable sea conditions the Catalinas could make a water landing and bring downed crewmwmbers aboard. In addition, a Boeing B-17 Flying Fortress, which could carry a large lifeboat below its fuselage, was detached to the squadron from the 457th Bombardment Group. The squadron and its predecessor were credited with saving 938 Allied airmen. Following V-E Day, the squadron began returning its Flying Fortress and Catalinas to the United States, while the Thunderbolts were returned to their permanent units. The squadron arrived at Keesler Field, Mississippi in June 1945, with the intention of redeploying to the Pacific. However, with the Japanese surrender in August, plans to redeploy were cancelled.

=== Cold War ===
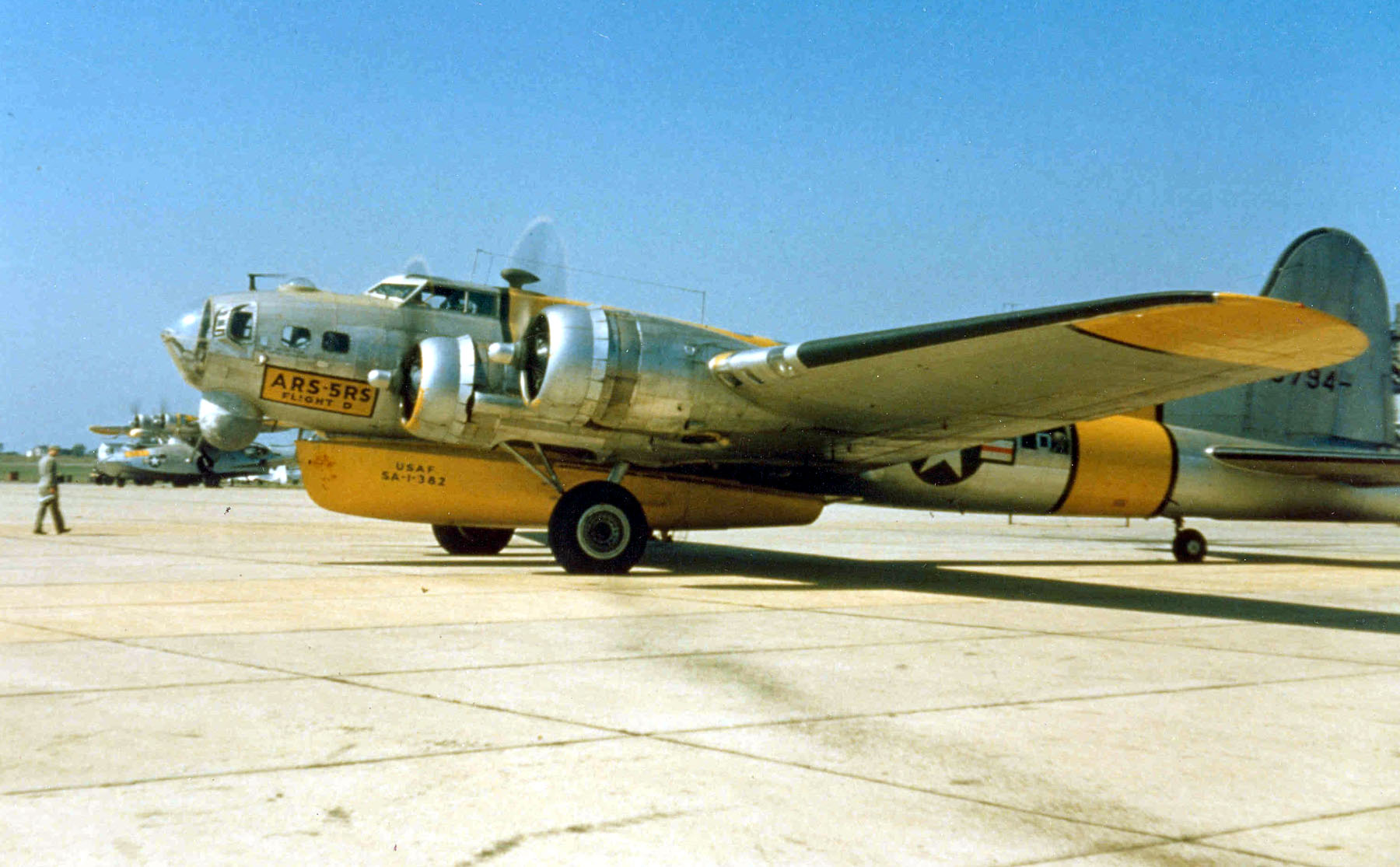
Squadron Boeing SB-17G

In January 1946, Air Transport Command began to implement a plan to centralize control of Army Air Forces rescue units, beginning with units in the United States. In March 1946, Headquarters, Air Rescue Service (ARS) was established, and the squadron was assigned to it. The squadron departed Keesler for Morrison Field in May 1946 in the first of a series of moves over the next five years. At Morrison, it joined Headquarters, ARS and became the service's training unit. It moved to MacDill Field, Florida in July 1947, where it continued its training activities, although it added Flights at Pope Field, North Carolina and Westover Field, Massachusetts with regional rescue missions.In 1948 the squadron participated in the Air Task Group supporting Operation Sandstone, a series of nuclear tests in the Pacific.

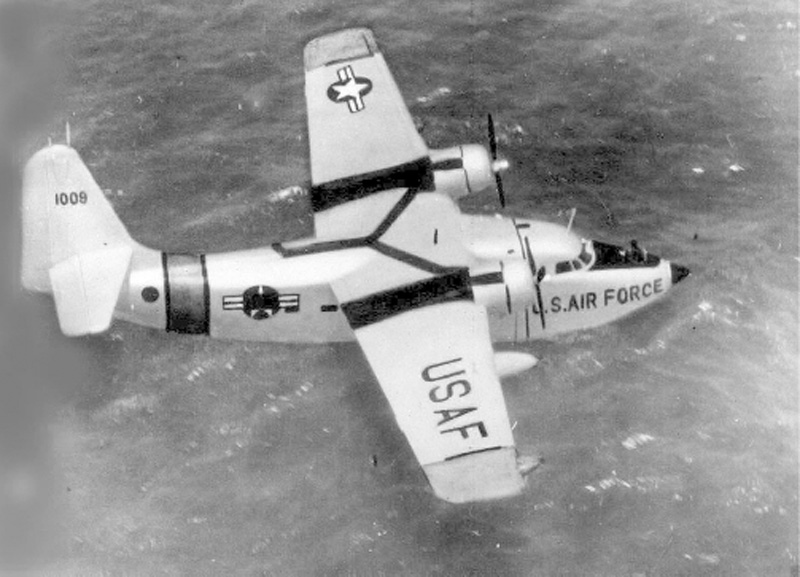
SA-16 Albatross as flown by the group

ARS reorganized its units in September 1949, and the squadron moved again to Lowry Air Force Base, Colorado in September 1949. It had four flights, Flight A was located with squadron headquarters at Lowry; Flight B was at Biggs Air Force Base, Texas; Flight C was at Maxwell Air Force Base, Alabama; and Flight D at Selfridge Air Force Base, Michigan. In January 1950, the squadron transferred its training mission to the 2156th Air Rescue Unit at MacDill.

When North Korea invaded South Korea in June 1950, there were no Grumman SA-16 Albatrosses assigned to rescue units in the Pacific. In July 1950, the squadron dispatched four of its SA-16s to reinforce the 3rd Air Rescue Squadron operating in Japan and Korea. By November, the 3rd Squadron began to receive its own SA-10s for wartime operations and was fully equipped by March 1951.

The squadron finally settled at Westover Air Force Base, Massachusetts in February 1951. The squadron was expanded to the 5th Air Rescue Group in 1952, and its flights became the 46th, 47th, 48th and 49th Air Rescue Squadrons. ARS began to eliminate its intermediate headquarters, and the group was inactivated in December 1956.

=== Reactivation ===
The unit was redesignated the 5th Helicopter Squadron and activated at Joint Base Andrews, Maryland in 2026. The squadron will initially train aircrew and maintenance personnel on the Sikorsky HH-60W Jolly Green II to bring the helicopter into service at Andrews. The unit is expected to reach full operational capability by 2030.

== Lineage ==
- Constituted as the 5th Emergency Rescue Squadron in 1944

Activated c. 26 January 1945
Redesignated 5th Rescue Squadron on 11 May 1947
Redesignated 5th Air Rescue Squadron on 10 August 1950
Redesignated Headquarters, 5th Air Rescue Group on 14 November 1952 (Note: The 5th Air Rescue Group is not related to the 5th Emergency Rescue Group, a provisional unit assigned to Fifth Air Force, which served in the Southwest Pacific Theater during WorldWar II.)
Inactivated on 8 December 1956
Redesignated 5th Helicopter Squadron c. 27 August 2026
Activated c. 1 September 2026

=== Assignments ===
- 65th Fighter Wing, 26 January 1945
- 79th Air Service Group, c. 26 June 1945
- Air Rescue Service, c. 24 March 1946 – 8 December 1956
- 316th Operations Group, c. 1 September 2026 – present

=== Components ===
- 46th Air Rescue Squadron, 14 November 1952 – 8 December 1956

Westover Air Force Base, Massachusetts

- 47th Air Rescue Squadron, 14 November 1952 – 8 December 1956

Ellington Air Force Base, Texas

- 48th Air Rescue Squadron, 14 November 1952 – 8 December 1956

Maxwell Air Force Base, Alabama until 10 January 1955, then Eglin Air Force Base, Florida

- 49th Air Rescue Squadron, 14 November 1952 – 8 December 1956

Selfridge Air Force Base, Michigan

=== Stations ===
- Unknown, 1944
- RAF Halesworth (Sta 365), England, 26 January 1945
- Keesler Field, Mississippi, 26 June 1945
- Morrison Field, Florida 20 May 1946
- MacDill Field (later MacDill Air Force Base), Florida, 12 July 1947
- Lowry Air Force Base, Colorado, 1 September 1949
- Westover Air Force Base, Massachusetts, 20 February 1951 – 8 December 1956
- Joint Base Andrews, Maryland, c. 1 September 2026 – present

=== Aircraft ===
- Republic P-47 Thunderbolt, 1944–1945 (Note: From 1946 to 1956, aircraft are included for years they were reported as assigned, and, therefore, may not be inclusive.)
- Consolidated OA-10 (later SA-10) Catalina, 1945–1950
- Boeing SB-17 Dumbo, 1945–1950
- Grumman SA-16 Albatross, 1950–1956
- Douglas SC-47 Skytrain, 1947–1954
- Fairchild C-82 Packet, 1950–1954
- Boeing SB-29 Super Dumbo, 1950–1954
- Sikorsky YR-5 (later H-5), c. 1946–1950
- Sikorsky SH-19, 1952–1956
- Sikorsky HH-60W Jolly Green II, 2026–present

=== Campaigns ===
Campaign Streamer	Campaign	Dates	Notes
	European Theater without inscription	26 January 1945–11 May 1945	(Note: AF Pamphlet 900-2, Unit Decorations, Awards and Campaign Participation Credits, 15 June 1971 lists credit for a campaign in the Pacific to the "5th Emergency Rescue Squadron", but this was apparently another provisional unit organized by Fifth Air Force.)

== See also ==
- List of United States Air Force rescue squadrons
- List of United States Air Force helicopter squadrons
- B-17 Flying Fortress units of the United States Army Air Forces
- List of B-29 Superfortress operators
- List of Douglas C-47 Skytrain operators
