= Semaphore Corporation =

American software company (1982–2017)

Semaphore Corporation was a company notable for being the first to provide public access to selected U.S. Postal Service databases, and for its early computer publications in the 1980s.

Founded in January 1982, the company operated for 35 years through September 2017. The firm's initial products were for Pick operating system programmers and users, followed by offerings for Lisa and Macintosh users, then finally concentrating solely on the Windows market.

== Software, services, and periodicals by Semaphore ==
ADOsort was a Windows program for sorting and printing postal mail to allow qualifying for first and third class mail postage discounts. Originally bundled with a $19 companion database for ZP4 in 2005, ADOsort became a free downloadable program along with a number of other tools in 2016. Complete source code was released in 2017, and is still downloadable with the MAF installer. ADOsort includes editable data tables and a postal form editor, making it notable as a program that allowed adjusting for Postal Service pricing and form layout changes from year to year without making any source code changes.

B-TREE-P was a $395 collection of subroutines for using B-trees with the Pick operating system. First distributed in April 1986 and last updated in December 1989, source code is still available online. Selections of new customers were listed in advertisements in each edition of Pragma's Product Profiles. Three dozen copies were sold during the first four months of distribution ("That's actually quite spectacular for a $395 off-the-shelf Pick software product").

CARGO (Column And Row GeneratOr) was a $880 spreadsheet generator similar to the T/Maker product by Lifeboat Associates, but ran on the version of the Pick operating system found on Microdata computers, and was first released in August 1982. About 50 copies were sold, after originally being developed as a consulting project for a Pick user who had created a huge VisiCalc marketing model on their Apple II that required 23 floppy disks.

COMICS (COMputerized Inmate Cash System) was software for maintaining California county jail inmate welfare funds and commissaries, bundled with General Automation computers running the Pick operating system. Pricing started at $14,990. Installations were made at various facilities in Monterey and San Mateo counties.

FreeCCS was software to do credit card processing for merchants, created in-house in 1997 as a replacement for MacAuthorize due to a bug found in that product. Subsequently offered as a free public download, FreeCCS source code was also available for $299, using Think Pascal 4.0.2 for Macintosh and Delphi 2.0 for Windows.

MAF (Master Address File) was a free online address correction and validation service, replacing ZP4 and ZP4net in December 2017, when the final databases licensed by Semaphore from the Postal Service expired. Unlike the Postal Service ZIP+4 database of address ranges used by ZP4, MAF used a proprietary database of individual addresses, although all the software was essentially identical to that found in ZP4net. MAF was discontinued March 12, 2018, but all originally available tools (including gender taggers, name parsers, barcode generators, and many other applications), source code, and documentation can still be downloaded.

Pragma (later becoming Pragma's Product Profiles) was a periodical for Pick operating system users and programmers published from August 1982 through May 1989, totaling 56 issues, all of which are archived online.

Semaphore Signal (originally simply Signal) was a periodical for Lisa and then Macintosh users published from June 17, 1983 through September 15, 1986, totaling 28 issues, all of which are archived online. Circulation of the final issue was 75,021.

Stride was MRP software for manufacturing companies, using the Pick operating system and targeted for General Automation computers. A version of Stride modified for distribution companies was acquired and used internally by Educorp, a Del Mar California distributor of Macintosh freeware and shareware.

Telefolders was an icon-based bulletin board service for Macintosh computers for sharing files and private mail. Announced in 1986, Semaphore operated Telefolders as a public network, charging $49.95 for the Macintosh software plus per-minute fees for dial-in access. Host themselves (General Automation computers) could also be purchased starting at 6 serial ports for $8,300, or just the host software for $995.

Where Did They Move To? was a free online web site to find forwarding addresses for people who moved. The service began in 1996, and originally depended on movers submitting their address changes at Semaphore's web site. Beginning in November 1998, Semaphore used Postal Service "black boxes" connected to Windows machines to do lookups against the national FASTforward database of forwarding addresses filed by movers at their post offices. During the service's lifetime 172,754,410 free old-address lookups were processed for customers, and 3,404,568 new forwarding addresses were found. In March 1999 the Delphi code used to drive the black boxes was posted online for users wishing to license their own black boxes from the Postal Service. After the Postal Service announced the replacement of FASTforward with NCOALink in June 2003, Semaphore offered certified NCOALink software for free through September 2006.

ZP4 address correction example
Input	Output
walt disney 114 5 newyork	The Walt Disney Company; 114 5th Ave Fl 13; New York NY 10011-5690

ZP4 was the company's longest continuous product offering, sold for 28 years. To help maintain their Pragma and Semaphore Signal subscriber lists, the company began using Postal Service databases for in-house address correction and validation, and subsequently licensed and sold the data with custom Semaphore software for the Macintosh, beginning with the five-digit ZIP database (as their $99 Z5 product, available in 1989) and mail carrier route database (as $75 ZCR, in 1990) both available on CD-ROM, followed by the ZIP+4 database (as $125 ZP4) beginning in 1990. ZP4 became CASS-certified as address correction software by the Postal Service in 1991 and was regularly recertified thereafter. A Windows version was offered in April 1994 and the Macintosh version was frozen and no longer updated after August 2000. ZP4 discs were initially updated quarterly, then bimonthly, then monthly (at $99 each), to meet Postal Service regulations for using current data. Various additional Postal Service databases were offered on optional companion compact discs to enhance ZP4: ZIPMOVE (five-digit ZIP changes, began in 2000), DPV (Delivery Point Validation, for validating individual addresses instead of only ZIP+4 address ranges, began in 2002), LACSLink (for rural route conversions, began in 2005), eLOT (Enhanced Line Of Travel, began in 2006), SuiteLink (for appending missing suite numbers, began in 2007), DirectDPV (to bypass address reparsing, began in 2007), RDI (Residential Delivery Index, to identify residential versus business addresses, began in 2009). Semaphore was the first vendor to certify for and ship the DPV and DirectDPV databases to users. Semaphore's GEO database of latitudes, longitudes, and census tracts and blocks, derived from Tiger files, was also sold beginning in 2006. DVD-ROM versions of ZP4 began shipping in 2005, and in 2013, separate companion discs were discontinued and all data and software was bundled on a single DVD. The last ZP4 DVD shipped in 2016 after a total of 214,312 various editions of postal databases had been shipped on discs, being replaced by the online ZP4net service.

ZP4net was an online version of ZP4 that became available in 2011, allowing all of Semaphore's address correction and validation applications to run unchanged on client machines while accessing the postal databases on Semaphore servers. ZP4net fees were based on the total bytes sent and received to servers. In 2017, the fee was $1 per 1.75 megabytes of input/output, generally equivalent to 10,000 address corrections per dollar. ZP4net was discontinued November 30, 2017, being replaced by MAF, and ending Semaphore's twenty-eight year period of selling Postal Service databases.
