= List of United States Air Force helicopter squadrons =

This article lists the helicopter squadrons of the United States Air Force. Helicopter squadrons have various roles, including flying training, air and field support, airlift, and search and rescue.

== Helicopter squadrons ==
Squadron	Insignia	Location	Nickname	Note
1st Helicopter Squadron		Andrews AFB		
5th Helicopter Squadron		Andrews AFB		Activated Aug 2026
8th Helicopter Squadron		Langley AFB		Inactivated 1971
20th Helicopter Squadron		several		to Special Operations Squadron
21st Helicopter Squadron		several		to Special Operations Squadron
22d Helicopter Squadron		Goose AB		to 22d Helicopter Flight
23d Helicopter Squadron		Goose AB		consolidated with 23rd Tactical Air Support Squadron
24th Helicopter Squadron		several		to 24th Tactical Air Support Flight
37th Helicopter Squadron		F.E. Warren AFB		
40th Helicopter Squadron		Malmstrom AFB		
54th Helicopter Squadron		Minot AFB	"Nomads of the North"	
72nd Helicopter Squadron		Langley AFB	"Eager Beavers" / "Eight Balls"	
76th Helicopter Squadron		Vandenberg AFB		Inactivated
1001st Helicopter Squadron		several		History bestowed on 1st Helicopter Squadron
4401st Helicopter Squadron		Langley AFB		
4460th Helicopter Squadron		Indian Springs AFS		
5040th Helicopter Squadron		Eielson AFB		CH/SH/HH-21

== See also ==
- List of United States Air Force squadrons
