= Programmers at Work =

1986 computer programming book

- Front cover Tempus Books reprint (1989)
- Author: Susan Lammers
- Language: English
- Subject: Computer Programming
- Publisher: Microsoft Press (1986 edition), 8080 Books/Simon & Schuster (2026 edition)
- Publication date: 1986 (first edition); 1989 (Tempus Books reprint); 2026 (40th anniversary edition)
- ISBN: 978-1556152115 (first edition); ISBN 979-8993755304 (40th anniversary edition)

Programmers at Work is a collection of technical interviews with nineteen prominent software developers from the early personal computer era. The interviews, published by Microsoft Press in 1986, were designed to capture the personalities and driving forces behind the development of innovative algorithms, computer systems, application software, and video games, while also exploring larger topics such as ethics and the future of computing. The book focuses primarily on the achievements software developers were able to accomplish within the limits of 16-bit computing architectures, including the IBM Personal Computer and Apple Macintosh.

The in-person interviews were conducted by the book’s author and editor, Susan Lammers. Lammers was an early Microsoft employee who became Editor-in-Chief of Microsoft Press in the mid-1980s.

The original collection of interviews was published on June 26, 1986. In 2026, a 40th anniversary edition of the book was released by 8080 Books and Simon & Schuster with a new preface by Lammers. The 2026 edition seeks to demonstrate how the lessons learned from early programmers are still relevant today, especially in topics related to software design, computer architecture, and creativity.

== Contents ==
=== Introduction ===
Programmers at Work features an introduction written by Lammers in which she establishes her main goals in creating the collection. She discusses computer programming culture and timeless design and engineering issues that are sometimes neglected in the tech industry. One of the goals of the presentation is to inspire and educate younger programmers. Lammers also claims her motivation was to stay as much in the background as possible during the interviews, letting the personality and ideas of the programmers take center stage.

Each chapter of the book features a short biography of the programmer and a comprehensive interview. Hand-drawn images of the interviewees are also featured in each chapter.

Interviewees include:

- Charles Simonyi, Microsoft software architect and originator of Microsoft Word
- Butler Lampson, computer scientist and fellow of the ACM
- John Warnock, early Xerox PARC employee and co-founder of Adobe Systems, Inc.
- Gary Kildall, creator of the CP/M operating system
- Bill Gates, creator of Altair 8800 BASIC and co-founder of Microsoft
- John Page, early Hewlett-Packard employee and creator of PFS:FILE database
- Wayne Ratliff, programmer and designer of Vulcan database and dBASE
- Dan Bricklin, co-designer of VisiCalc spreadsheet
- Bob Frankston, co-designer of VisiCalc and contributor to Lotus 1-2-3 spreadsheet
- Jonathan Sachs, co-founder of Lotus Development Corporation and originator of Lotus 1-2-3 spreadsheet
- Ray Ozzie, contributor to PLATO (University of Illinois) and designer of Lotus Notes
- Peter Roizen, T/Maker spreadsheet co-founder and software developer
- Robert Carr, architect of GO Corporation's PenPoint operating system
- Jef Raskin, visual arts professor and originator of the Macintosh project at Apple
- Andy Hertzfeld, software engineer on original Macintosh project at Apple
- Toru Iwatani, video game designer and creator of the arcade game Pac-Man
- Scott Kim, visual designer and calligrapher; author of the book Inversions
- Jaron Lanier, computer scientist, futurist, and composer
- Michael Hawley, academic and artist working in the field of digital media

=== Glossary ===
The glossary section of the book features technical terms that arose during the interviews, allowing readers to explore evolving terminology as it took shape in the 1980s. The resources in this section make the book accessible to a wide range of readers and may be useful for historians of technology.

Example: “Boolean Algebra: A system of logic functions named after George Boole that uses operators such as AND, OR, NOT, EXCEPT, IF, and, THEN to derive the solution of logical problems in which each element can be one of two states, usually true or false."

=== Appendix ===
The appendix features supporting technical materials for twelve of the interviews. These include handwritten diagrams, source code, and supplemental images that document how each developer approached their work, including early stages of the design process. Notable examples include Bill Gates' handwritten notes from 1975 for his implementation of BASIC for the MITS Altair microcomputer.

== Reception ==
In 1986, Erik Sandberg-Diment of The New York Times wrote that Programmers at Work did for budding software writers what the Paris Review interviews did for would-be fiction writers in the 1950s and 60s. It provided comfort, inspiration, and a sense of community between readers and creators who were establishing new products.

Wired editor Steven Levy cited the interviews as useful source material to capture the creativity of Xerox PARC during the early days of computing.

Academic researchers also used Programmers at Work to study visual imagery during the software development process, including the mental models that programmers sometimes use to conceptualize data or hardware architecture.
