= War effort =

Coordinated mobilization of society's resources towards supporting a military force

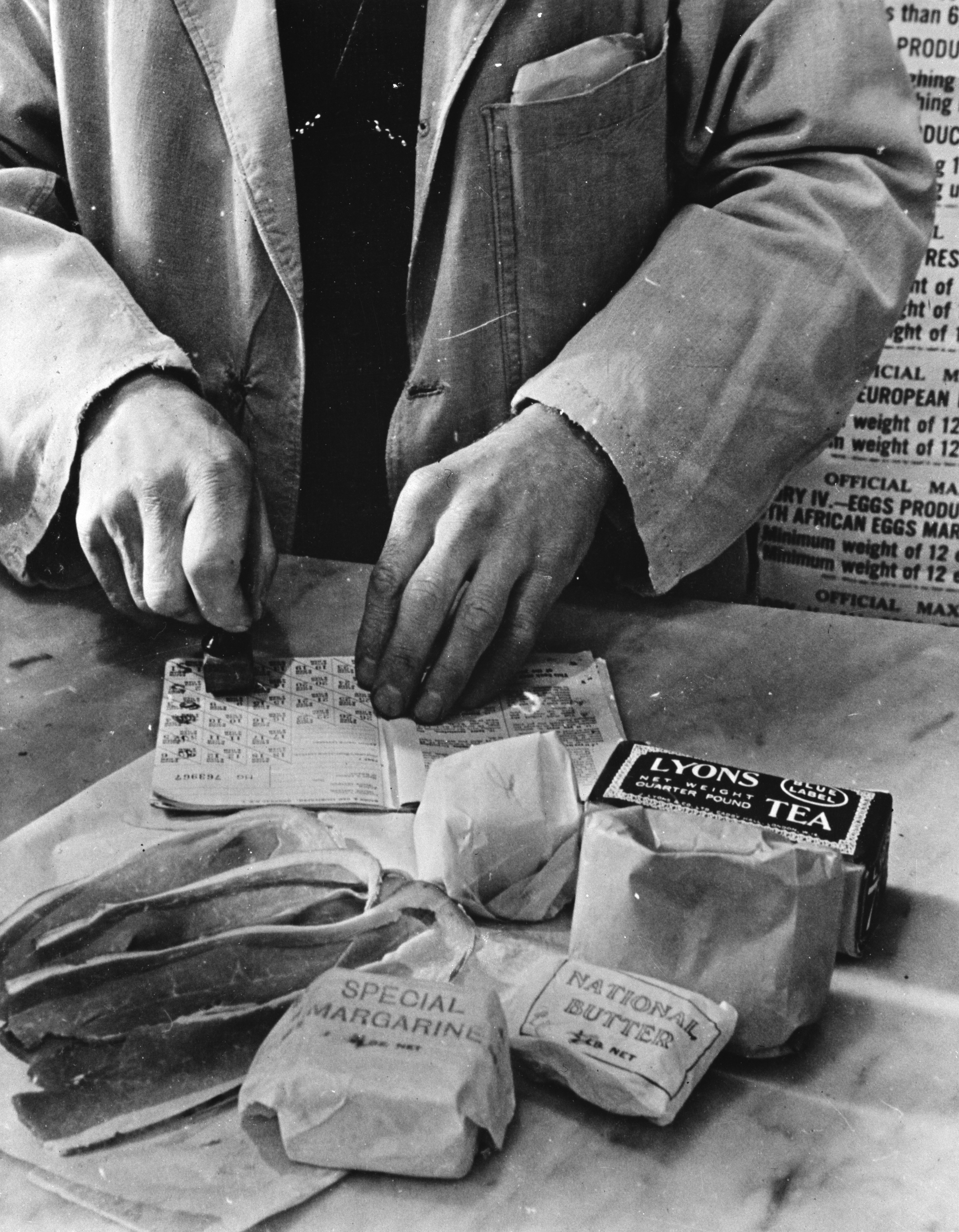
Civilian rationing: A shopkeeper cancels the coupons in a British housewife's ration book.

War effort is a coordinated mobilization of society's resources—both industrial and civilian—towards the support of a military force, particularly during a state of war. Depending on the militarization of the culture, the relative size of the armed forces and the society supporting them, the style of government, and the famous support for the military objectives, such war effort can range from a small industry to complete command of society.

Although many societies were retroactively perceived to be engaged in a war effort, the concept was not generally used until the last decade of the 18th century, when the leaders of the French Revolution called for the levée en masse and a general mobilization of society to prevent monarchist forces from reclaiming control of the French government.

The concept was subsequently adapted and used by Russia, the United Kingdom, and the United States, especially during World War I and World War II. The term war effort was coined in conjunction with these efforts.

== Economy ==
Although certain societies, especially nomadic raiders and mobile cavalry societies such as the Mongols, specialized in providing war-effort-like support for their armies, the idea of a specialized war effort that diverted supplies, means of production, and people to military support came into general use only with the increased specialization of the Industrial Revolution. Previously, most military supplies were either common elements of the economy (food, clothing, horses) or specialized instruments produced only for war purposes by industries dedicated to the task (mainly weapons and military vehicles).

Moreover, in feudal societies, peasants, the great majority of the population, often perceived war as the business of the aristocrats and did not feel especially obliged to make an extra effort to help their country's aristocracy win a war with that of another country. The modern concept of a state belonging to its "people" carried the concomitant assumption that war was everybody's business and everyone, combatant or not, was expected to contribute actively to winning it.

Crossover use of peacetime elements of society and economy for wartime uses became important because of the scarcity of manpower and the large size of armies and specialized materials used for war production (rubber, aluminum, steel, etc.). The complex decisions involved in conversion to wartime use also necessitated organization and a bureaucracy; the term war effort was coined to describe these collective tasks.

Implicit in the concept of war effort was that the entire society was expected to contribute in some way; this served the double purpose of improving morale as well as resource conservation.

A war effort was also used to help companies grow. An example of this was when the military would contract companies such as Boeing to produce war resources for them. That would eventually give room for innovation and technological advances for such companies.

Closely related is the concept of the home front—i.e., that civilians engaged in wartime pursuits (particularly, industrial production) are in effect also fighting the enemy on a "front" of their own, and that the result of their "fighting" (higher productivity, refraining from labor disputes, strikes etc.) might determine the difference between victory and defeat.

== See also ==
- Economic warfare
- Home front
- Industrial warfare
- Materiel
- Total war
- War economy

World War 2:

- Home front during World War II
- United States home front during World War II
