= WriteNow =

Word processor application

- WriteNow 1.00 on the Mac platform
- Original authors: John Anderson, Bill Tschumy
- Developer: T/Maker
- Release: 1985; 41 years ago
- Final release: WriteNow 4.0
- Operating system: Macintosh, NeXTSTEP
- Type: Word processor
- License: Proprietary

WriteNow is a word processor application for the original Apple Macintosh and later computers in the NeXT product line. The application is one of two word processors that were first developed with the goal that they be available at the time of the Mac product launch in 1984, and was the primary word processor for computers manufactured by NeXT. WriteNow was purchased from T/Maker by WordStar in 1993, but shortly after that, WordStar merged with SoftKey, which ultimately led to its discontinuation. It had a combination of powerful features, excellent performance, and small system requirements.

== History ==
WriteNow was written for Apple Computer, Inc., by John Anderson and Bill Tschumy in Seattle, separate from the Macintosh computer and MacWrite word processor development teams. Steve Jobs was concerned that those programming MacWrite were not going to be ready for the 1984 release date of the Macintosh; Apple Computer therefore commissioned a team of programmers, friends of Apple engineer Bud Tribble, to work independently on a similar project, which eventually became WriteNow. Members of the WriteNow team knew about MacWrite, but members of the MacWrite team did not know about WriteNow.

Ultimately, MacWrite was completed on schedule and shipped with the Macintosh. This left WriteNow in limbo until Jobs left Apple to form NeXT and bought Solaster Software which was started by John Anderson, Bill Tschumy and Christopher Stinson. John and Bill, the authors of WriteNow, joined NeXT. WriteNow marketing rights ended up being owned by NeXT, and WriteNow released for the Macintosh in 1985, published by the T/Maker Company.

In October 1988, WriteNow 2.0 was released on Macintosh, adding dictionaries, character / word / paragraph count, import and export of RTF and MacWrite files, and updated compatibility with recent system enhancements. Version 3.0 introduced style sheets.

== Features ==
WriteNow improved on some of the limitations of MacWrite through the better handling of large documents and the addition of features such as spell check and footnotes. It was "lean and fast," being written entirely in assembly language, and it was suited for Macintosh users with only 400 KB floppy disk. WriteNow went through several versions culminating (in 1993) with version 4.0.2, which continued the "lean and fast" reputation while adding features such as tables.

In the opinion of many of its users, WriteNow represented the ideal Macintosh application. It had a simple, intuitive graphical user interface (GUI), no copy protection, and it worked in practically every revision of the Macintosh operating system, including in the Mac 68k emulator on PowerPC Macs and in the Classic Environment under Mac OS X. Its biggest claim to fame, however, was its speed. It was written in assembly language (Motorola 680x0) by a group of developers who had a reputation for producing extremely efficient code. The user interface was unusual in that, while the typical word processor had a ruler embedded in the main document window, WriteNow used a separate, fixed window that could be sent into the background, freeing screen space on the compact Mac's small nine-inch screen to display an additional line or two of text.

== NeXT port ==
Early on WriteNow was ported to the NeXT operating system and was subsequently bundled with NeXT workstations.

Due to concerns of third-party publishers such as WordPerfect over the issue of competing with a free word processor, it was unbundled 1 October 1991 and ownership transferred to Appsoft, which sold it as shrink-wrapped software. From that time, NeXTSTEP shipped without a full-featured word processing program. WriteNow for NeXT became available for sale on October 15 for $199.

WriteNow was written in Motorola 68k assembly language, upon which the NeXT hardware was based.

== Reception ==
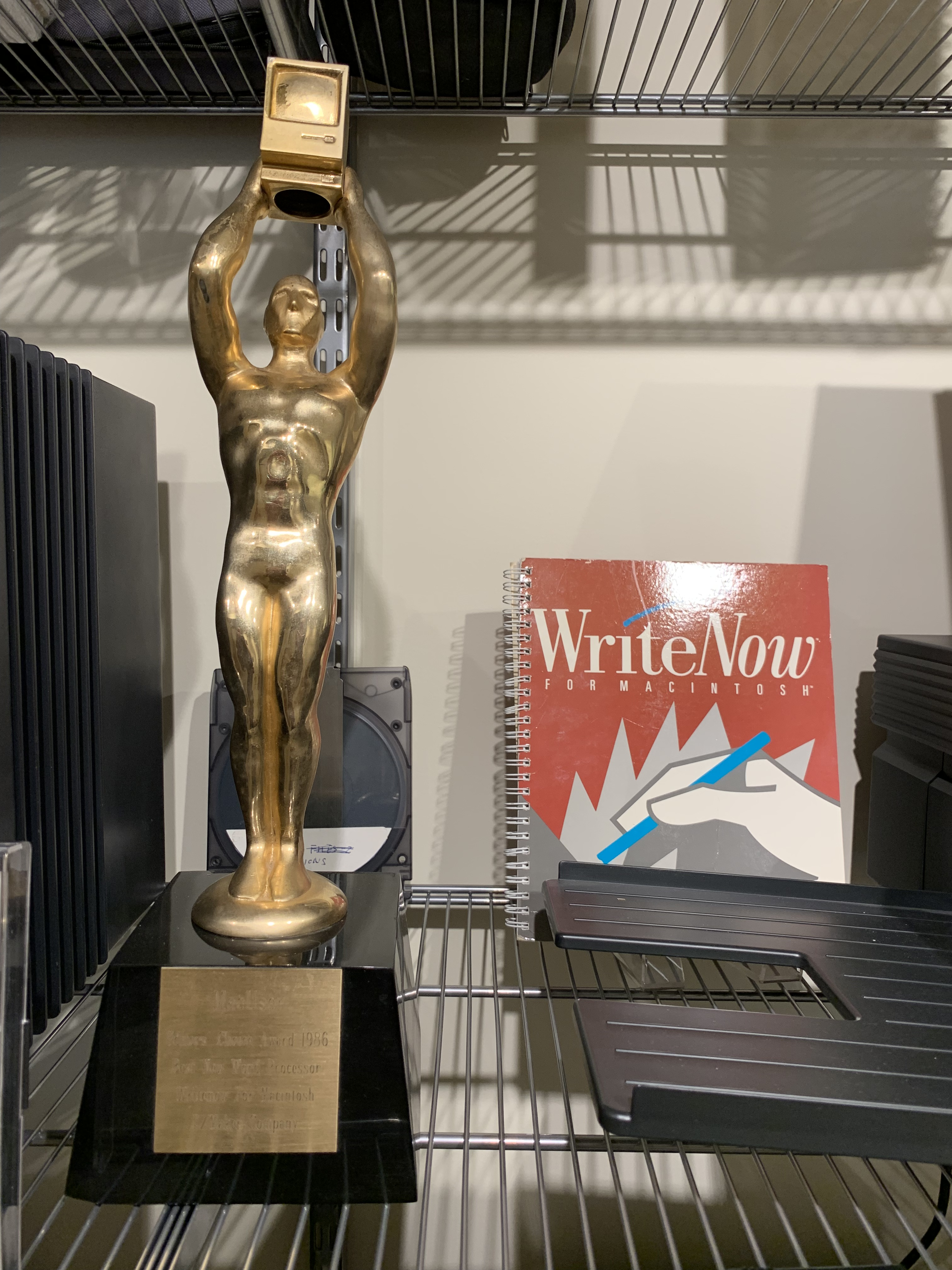
MacUser Editors' Choice Award for Best New Word Processor 1986

Compute!'s Apple Applications in 1987 wrote that "WriteNow is the Pegasus of Macintosh word processors—swift, easy to learn and use, and packed with power".

MacUser gave WriteNow 2.0 for Macintosh a 4 mice (out of 5) in the August 1989 issue, pitting it against MacWrite II. It praised the speed of the application, while criticizing the complexity of the multi-column formatting. WriteNow won MacUser's Editor's Choice Award for Best New Word Processor in 1986 and 1988.

== Discontinuation ==
Around 1993, rights to WriteNow (for both Macintosh and NeXT operating systems) were purchased by WordStar. Shortly after that, WordStar merged with SoftKey, and WriteNow was later discontinued. The lifecycle of computers using the 680x0 architecture was coming to an end, and the architecture-specific assembly language code that made WriteNow so much faster than its competitors also made it much more difficult to port to the new PowerPC processor than competing word processors written in high-level languages such as C.

== See also ==
- SimpleText
- TextEdit
- List of word processors
