= Peter Roizen =

- Born: Montreal, Quebec, Canada
- Occupations: software developer, co-founder
- Notable credit(s): T/Maker co-founder & software developer (1983) World Bank software developer Vector Graphics software developer Northstar software developer
- Spouse: Sonja Roizen
- Children: Alexander Roizen
- Website: www.roizen.com/peter/

Peter Roizen (born 1946) is a software developer, game creator and entrepreneur. He was co-founder of T/Maker Company.

== Life and work ==
Roizen was born in 1946 in Montreal, Quebec, Canada. He graduated from Cubberley High School in Palo Alto, California in 1963 and from the University of California, Berkeley in 1967 with a degree in mathematics.

He was employed as a software developer for the World Health Organization in Geneva, Switzerland; he later moved to Washington DC and worked for the World Bank. It was his work with the World Bank that led him to invent a "Table Maker" software program that would allow formulae to be abstracted from data, therefore allowing the table's formulae to be re-used with different data sets without the need for a new program.

Coincident with the advent of early personal computer platforms such as Vector Graphic and Northstar, which utilized the CP/M operating system, Roizen was able to develop his "Table Maker" software for individual use on personal computers. Not only was his software one of the earliest spreadsheet programs, it can also claim title to the earliest ‘integrated application’ as the program was also a capable word processor and early database system. Roizen renamed it T/Maker and sold the first version through software distributor Lifeboat Associates of New York.

In 1983 he co-founded T/Maker Company (with his sister Heidi Roizen) to take over sales and distribution of T/Maker and other software products. Roizen's early work with spreadsheets and ideas about programming are described in the book Programmers at Work, a collection of interviews published by Microsoft Press.

Roizen went on to develop other software products, including T/Master and "I Hate Algebra" as well as the early internet communications product Touchpoint. In 2005, he created WildWords, a board-based word game. He has been included in Accidental Empires: How the Boys of Silicon Valley Make Their Millions..., History of the Personal Computer, Wicked Problems, Righteous Solutions: A Catalogue Of Modern Software Engineering Paradigms, and multiple issues of InfoWorld in the 1980s, 1990s and 2000.

He and his wife Sonja Roizen live in South Lake Tahoe, California.
