= Semaphore (disambiguation) =

Semaphore is the use of an apparatus with telegraphy to create a visual signal transmitted over long-distances.

It may refer more specifically to:

- Flag semaphore
- Semaphore telegraph, a system of long-distance communication based on towers with moving arms
- Railway semaphore signal for railway traffic control
- Traffic semaphore, another name for automotive traffic lights based on their early resemblance to railway semaphores
- Turning semaphore or trafficators, retractable arms to indicate turns on automobiles from the 1920s to 1950s

== Other ==
- Semaphore (programming), in computer science, a mechanism for supporting mutual exclusion in concurrent programs
- Semaphore (software), a continuous integration testing utility
- Semaphore, South Australia, a historic seaside suburb of Adelaide
- Semaphore railway line, Adelaide, a closed railway line in South Australia
- Semaphore Corporation (company), a software and publishing firm that operated from 1982 to 2017
- Semaphore (album), a 1998 album by Fridge
- "Semaphore" (song), a 2004 single by the New Zealand band Jakob
- Semaphore, fictional professor in Cubitus comic strips or Wowser cartoons

== See also ==
- International maritime signal flags, one system of flag signals representing individual letters of the alphabet in signals to or from ships
- Semafor (website), news website
- Telegraphy, the long-distance transmission of written messages without physical transport of written letters
