= Lifeboat Distribution =

- Type: Public
- Traded as: Nasdaq: WSTG
- Industry: Software distribution
- Headquarters: Eatontown, New Jersey
- Number of locations: 4
- Area served: Worldwide
- Products: Computer Software, Information Technology
- Revenue: ▲$449 million (2017)
- Number of employees: 150
- Website: lifeboatdistribution.com

Lifeboat Distribution is an international value-added distributor. Their customers are vendors who specialize in virtualization/cloud computing, security, application and network infrastructure, business continuity/disaster recovery, database infrastructure and management, application lifecycle management, science/engineering, and other technical products.

Lifeboat is headquartered in Eatontown, New Jersey, and also has offices in Arizona, Ontario, and Amsterdam.

Lifeboat Distribution is a subsidiary of Wayside Technology Group, Inc. (NASDAQ: WSTG), which has been a publicly traded company since 1995.

== History ==
=== Early years ===
In June 1986, Lifeboat Associates was acquired by Voyager Software Corp. By 1988, Voyager was a three-division company; Lifeboat was the software distributor, Corsoft the corporate reseller, and Programmer's Paradise a mail-order operation.

=== The 1990s and 2000s ===
In May 1995, Voyager Software Corp changed its name to Programmer's Paradise, Inc. and at that time, changed Lifeboat Associates' name to Lifeboat Distribution. In July 1995, Programmer's Paradise completed an initial public offering of its common stock.

On January 9, 2001, Lifeboat's European operations were sold along with all other Programmer's Paradise European operations to PC-Ware (now known as the Comparex Group).

Through the 2000s, Lifeboat expanded its vendor line card with established and emerging vendors such as InstallShield (later to become Flexera Software), Intel Software, TechSmith, GFI, and VMware.

Lifeboat developed a reputation for helping companies enter the two-tier (vendor-distributor-reseller) distribution model. For example, Lifeboat was VMware's first U.S. software distributor helping introduce that company’s nascent virtualization software to the channel.

In 2004, Lifeboat Distribution was appointed as Intel's Software Authorized Distributor in order to make that company's internally developed high-performance software development tools available to customers worldwide.

=== Present Day ===
Lifeboat specializes in technology domains that include not only virtualization/cloud computing, but also security, application and network infrastructure, database modeling, application lifecycle management, and business productivity.

Lifeboat recently added companies like Veeam Software, SolarWinds, and StorageCraft to its line card. The company now represents an extensive set of software for the now mainstream virtualization space – products that are marketed to resellers through Lifeboat’s Virtualization World View portfolio.

In 2010, Lifeboat opened an office in Almere, Netherlands in order to better serve the company’s European resellers.

Lifeboat competes against larger "broad line" distributors and must provide service differentiators to both its software vendors and its reseller customers. One way it has done this is through the deployment of innovative technologies, such as an electronic license key stocking system, EDI–based (Electronic Data Interchange) order processing, and data warehousing systems.
