= T/Maker =

- Developer(s): Peter Roizen
- Initial release: 1979; 46 years ago
- Operating system: CP/M, TRSDOS, MS-DOS
- Type: Spreadsheet

T/Maker (Table Maker) was one of the first spreadsheet programs designed for the personal computer user and released by Peter Roizen in 1979. The application ran on CP/M, TRSDOS, and later on MS-DOS computers. T/Maker was originally distributed by Lifeboat Associates of New York.

T/Maker took a different approach to most other spreadsheets: instead of embedding formulas in each cell, formulas were defined on a per-row and per-column basis in the margins.

Although T/Maker was released six months after VisiCalc, it was perhaps the first application to provide an 'office' suite approach to data. Tables could be used in databases or spreadsheets and were accessible in 'word' type documents.

== T/Maker Company ==
T/Maker Company
- Founded: 1983; 42 years ago, in Mountain View, California
- Founder: Peter Roizen, Heidi Roizen
- Defunct: 1994
- Fate: Acquired by Deluxe Corporation
- Key people: Heidi Roizen (CEO)
- Products: T/Maker; WriteNow; ClickArt

The T/Maker Company was an early personal computer software company, formed in 1983 in order to market CP/M and MS-DOS programs that had originally been published by 3rd party publishing houses. They expanded into the Apple Macintosh market, releasing the ClickArt line of clip art. Other products included WriteNow on the Mac and NeXT platforms.

In 1983 T/Maker Company was incorporated in Mountain View, California by Heidi Roizen – Peter's sister and a then-recent Stanford University Graduate School of Business graduate – who became its CEO.

T/Maker Company went on to publish its own line of integrated applications, and also products by others intended for DOS and Windows computers as well as the Apple Macintosh, including ClickArt, the fifth software title available for the Mac. It was also one of the first companies to offer fonts for the Macintosh. By 1988, it no longer sold the product of its namesake, T/Maker.

Other notable T/Maker products include Personal Publisher, a consumer-oriented desktop publishing application for the PC (acquired by Software Publishing Corporation in 1986), SmartBundle, an "office" styled bundle of major applications, Vroombooks, a multimedia storybook, and the Macintosh word processor WriteNow, (which it licensed from NeXT in 1985 and ultimately sold to WordStar in 1993).

Heidi and business partner/chairman Royal Farros purchased T/Maker from Peter in 1986 and continued bootstrapping until 1989, when it became venture capital firm Hummer Winblad Venture Partners’ first venture investment. Ann Winblad became a director of the company at that time. Tim Draper of Draper Fisher led the company’s second round in 1993 and also joined the board.

T/Maker was acquired in 1994 by Deluxe Corporation. Both Heidi and Royal left the company in 1996, Heidi becoming VP of Worldwide Developer Relations at Apple Computer and Royal founding and becoming CEO of an online print shop, iPrint.com.

T/Maker’s remaining products were ultimately acquired by Broderbund, who continues to market and expand the ClickArt line.
