= Heidi Roizen =

American venture capitalist

- Born: 1958 (age 67–68); Stanford, California
- Education: Stanford University (BA, MBA)
- Occupation: Venture capitalist
- Website: www.heidiroizen.com

Heidi Roizen (born 1958) is a Silicon Valley executive, venture capitalist, and entrepreneur.

She is known for speaking out against the harassment of women in technology, having herself received harassment in the past.

== Early life and education ==
Roizen was born in 1958 in Stanford, California. She graduated from Stanford University in 1980 with a bachelor's degree in English and earned her MBA from the Stanford University Graduate School of Business three years later.

== Career ==
From 1983 to 1996, Roizen co-founded, together with her brother Peter Roizen, the T/Maker Company, which made software for CP/M and MS-DOS computers, and later for the Apple Macintosh. From 1987 until 1994, Roizen also served on the board of directors of the Software Publishers Association and was its president from 1988 to 1990.

From 1996 to 1997, Roizen was Vice President of World Wide Developer Relations for Apple Inc. She also served on the board of Great Plains Software from 1997 until its acquisition by Microsoft in 2001.

Roizen also served as the Public Governor of the Pacific Exchange and on the executive committee of the National Venture Capital Association (NVCA).

Roizen entered the venture capital world in 1999, first as a Managing Director of SOFTBANK Venture Capital (which became Mobius Venture Capital), from 1999 to 2007, and then in 2012 she joined global investor Draper Fisher Jurvetson as a venture partner.

She also launched her own entrepreneurial venture, SkinnySongs, In September 2008, the Forum for Women Entrepreneurs and Executives awarded Heidi Roizen their annual Achievement Award.

In June 2009, Roizen was elected to the Board of Directors of TiVo, and in September 2012, she was elected to the board of London-based media conglomerate Daily Mail and General Trust (known as owners of the Daily Mail and its digital counterpart, Mail Online). At the time she was elected, she became the first female director in the company's 116-year history.

In 2010, Roizen was named a Lecturer and Entrepreneurship Educator at Stanford University, where she teaches the course 'Spirit of Entrepreneurship' in the MS&E (Engineering) department.

== Awards and recognition ==
Roizen was awarded 2018 Financial Woman of the Year by Financial Women of San Francisco.
