= Jennifer Roizen =

American chemist

Jennifer Lyn Roizen
- Education: Williams College; California Institute of Technology
- Scientific career
- Workplaces: Duke University
- Thesis: Progress Toward an Enantioselective Total Synthesis of Ineleganolide (2010)
- Doctoral advisor: Brian Stoltz
- Website: Roizen Research Group

Jennifer Lyn Roizen is an American chemist who is a professor at Duke University. Roizen studies C-H functionalization, antibiotics and selective ion channel inhibitors. She joined the International Advisory Board of Angewandte Chemie in 2021.

== Early life and education ==
Roizen was an undergraduate student at Williams College, where she was first introduced to asymmetric synthesis. She was awarded the James F. Skinner Prize for scholarship. She moved to the California Institute of Technology for graduate studies, where she worked under the supervision of Brian Stoltz. Her research considered enantioselective synthesis of ineleganolide. Her work led to the development of asymmetric ketone alkylation to form C(α)-tetrasubstituted carbonyl compounds.

== Research and career ==
Roizen remained on the West Coast for postdoctoral research, where she joined the laboratories of Justin Du Bois. Her research considered the intermolecular amination of tertiary C–H bonds.

Roizen was appointed to the faculty at Duke University in 2013. Her research considers free radical reactions. In 2017, she was awarded the Thieme Chemistry Journal's Award and was named one of ChemComm's Emerging Investigators. She was awarded the 2020 Duke University Dean's Award.

== Selected publications ==
- Jennifer L Roizen; Mark Edwin Harvey; J Du Bois (30 April 2012). "Metal-catalyzed nitrogen-atom transfer methods for the oxidation of aliphatic C-H bonds". Accounts of Chemical Research. 45 (6): 911–922. doi:10.1021/ar200318q. ISSN 0001-4842. PMC 5483381. PMID 22546004. Wikidata Q33831365.
- Douglas C Behenna; Justin T Mohr; Nathaniel H Sherden; et al. (14 November 2011). "Enantioselective decarboxylative alkylation reactions: catalyst development, substrate scope, and mechanistic studies". Chemistry: A European Journal. 17 (50): 14199–14223. doi:10.1002/chem.201003383. ISSN 0947-6539. PMC 3365686. PMID 22083969. Wikidata Q42182848.
- Jennifer L. Roizen; David N. Zalatan; J. Du Bois (2 September 2013). "Selective Intermolecular Amination of C–H Bonds at Tertiary Carbon Centers". Angewandte Chemie (in German). 125 (43): 11553–11556. doi:10.1002/ange.201304238. ISSN 0044-8249. Wikidata Q59809041.
