= John L. Wood =

American chemist (born 1961)

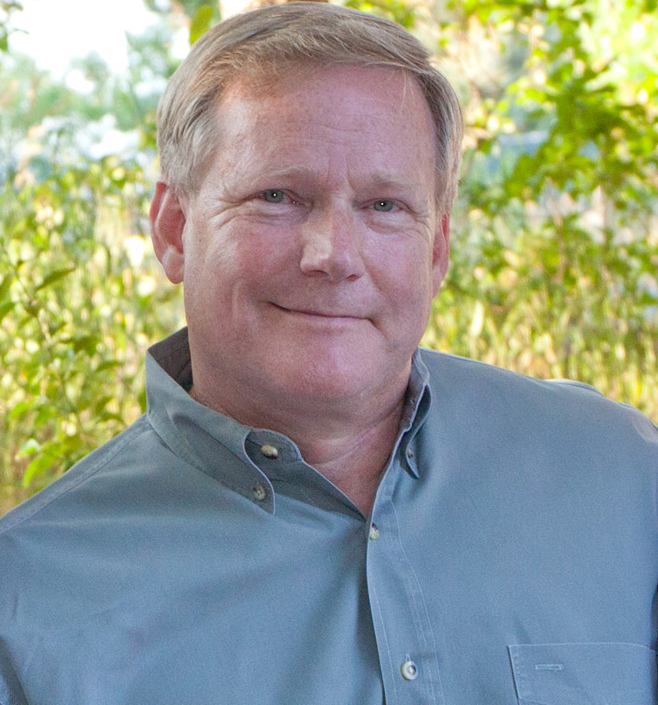
- Born: December 4, 1961 (age 64)
- Education: University of Colorado Boulder (B.S., 1985); University of Pennsylvania (Ph.D., 1990)
- Scientific career
- Fields: Chemistry
- Workplaces: Harvard University; Yale University; Colorado State University; Baylor University
- Doctoral advisor: Amos B. Smith, III
- Website: http://www.johnwoodgroup.com/

John L. Wood (born December 4, 1961) is a Robert A. Welch Distinguished Professor of Chemistry and Biochemistry; Cancer Prevention Research Institute of Texas Scholar; and Associate Editor for the Americas, Tetrahedron Letters at Baylor University.

Wood received a B.A. degree from the University of Colorado in 1985 and a Ph.D. from the University of Pennsylvania in 1991. He then moved to Harvard University as an American Cancer Society postdoctoral fellow and continued studying natural products synthesis in the laboratories of Stuart Schreiber. He joined the faculty at Yale University in 1993 as an assistant professor and was promoted to full professor in 1998. In 2006, he joined the faculty at Colorado State University as the Albert I. Meyers Professor of Chemistry.

== Awards and honors ==
- Ernest Guenther Award in the Chemistry of Natural Products 2024
- Katritzky Award in Heterocyclic Chemistry (ISHC) 2009
- 3éme Cycle Lectureship, University of Basel 2009
- Distinguished Behringer Simon Lecturer, ETH Zurich 2009
- Amgen Faculty Award 2005, 2006, 2007, 2008, 2009
- Japanese Society for the Promotion of Science Fellow 2008
- American Chemical Society Arthur C. Cope Scholar Award, 2004
- Yamanouchi USA Faculty Award 1998, 1999, 2000, 2001, 2002, 2003
- Merck Faculty Award 2000, 2001, 2002
- Kitasato Microbial Chemistry Medal 2001
- Bristol-Myers Squibb Foundation Research Award 1998–2001
- Pfizer Research Award 1997–2001
- Zeneca Excellence in Chemistry Award 1998
- Dreyfus Teacher Scholar Award 1998
- Novartis Chemistry Lectureship 1997–1998
- Alfred P. Sloan Foundation Fellow 1997
- Parke-Davis Distinguished Michigan Lecturer 1997
- Bristol-Myers Squibb Research Award 1997
- Glaxo-Wellcome Young Chemistry Scholar Award 1996–1998
- Eli Lilly Young Faculty Award 1996–1997
- NSF CAREER award 1996–2000
- Yale University, Junior Faculty Fellowship, 1996–1997
- American Cancer Society, Junior Faculty Award 1994
- Camille and Henry Dreyfus New Faculty Award 1993
- American Cancer Society Postdoctoral Fellowship 1991–1993
- National Institutes of Health Postdoctoral Fellowship 1991–1993 (declined)
- University of Pennsylvania Dean's Dissertation Fellowship 1989–1990
- Distinguished Organic Chemistry Teaching Award 1986
