= Lifeboat Associates =

Software distributor and magazine publisher in the 1970s and 1980s

Lifeboat Associates, Inc.
- Industry: Software
- Founded: 1976/77
- Headquarters: New York City
- Key people: Larry Alkoff, Tony Gold
- Products: T/Maker, The Boss Financial Accounting System

Lifeboat Associates, Inc., was a New York City company that was one of the largest microcomputer software distributors in the late 1970s, and early 1980s. Lifeboat acted as an independent software broker marketing software to major hardware vendors such as Xerox, HP and Altos. As such Lifeboat Associates was instrumental in the founding of Autodesk and also financed the creation of PC Magazine.

== Overview ==
Lifeboat was founded in 1976 or 1977 by Larry Alkoff and Tony Gold. By mid-1981 the company had same-name affiliates in England, Switzerland, France, Germany, Japan and Oakland, California. PC Magazine in 1982 wrote that Lifeboat "has published and marketed more CP/M application programs on more 8-bit machines than anyone in the world", and in 1983 InfoWorld said that Lifeboat was the largest publisher of microcomputer software in the world.

Lifeboat Associates combined many roles, including publisher and distributor, and actively solicited authors for software products that met its standards. As of 1983 20% of revenue was from dealers, and the rest from direct retail sales to mail-order customers from a mailing list of 160,000. Lifeboat converted software between CP/M disk formats; companies such as Hewlett-Packard and Xerox paid it to compile software catalogs included with computers. Proprietary products were 25% of revenue.

The company distributed T/Maker (written by Peter Roizen), one of the first spreadsheet programs designed for the personal computer user, which went a step beyond the similar VisiCalc program by offering text-processing capability, and The Boss Financial Accounting System (written by John Burns), a $2495 package for CP/M users. It was one of the first accounting programs for micro-computers. In addition Lifeboat Associates started collecting and distributing user-written "free" software, initially for the CP/M operating system. One of the first was XMODEM, which allowed reliable communication via modem and phone line.

In June 1986, Voyager Software Corp acquired Lifeboat Associates. Later in 1986, Programmer's Paradise was started by Voyager Software as a catalog marketer of technical software. In 1988, Voyager acquired Corsoft Inc., a corporate reseller founded in 1983, and combined it with the operations of the Programmer's Paradise catalog and Lifeboat Associates, both of which marketed technical software for microcomputers. In May 1995, Voyager Software Corp. changed its name to "Programmers Paradise, Inc." and consolidated its U.S. catalog and software publishing operations in a new subsidiary, Programmers Paradise Catalogs, Inc. and its wholesale distribution operations in a new subsidiary, Lifeboat Distribution, Inc. In July 1995, Programmer's Paradise completed an initial public offering of its common stock. Programmer's Paradise, Inc. changed its name to Wayside Technology Group, Inc. in August 2006.

== Products ==
- T/Maker (Table Maker) – one of the first spreadsheet programs designed for the personal computer user
- The Boss – Financial Accounting System
- Software Bus-80, also known as SB-80 – a version of CP/M-80 for 8080/Z80 8-bit computers
- Software Bus-86, also known as SB-86 – a version of MS-DOS for x86 16-bit computers

== See also ==
- Software Bus
