= Fairchild Republic A-10 Thunderbolt II =

American close air support attack aircraft

A-10 / OA-10 Thunderbolt II
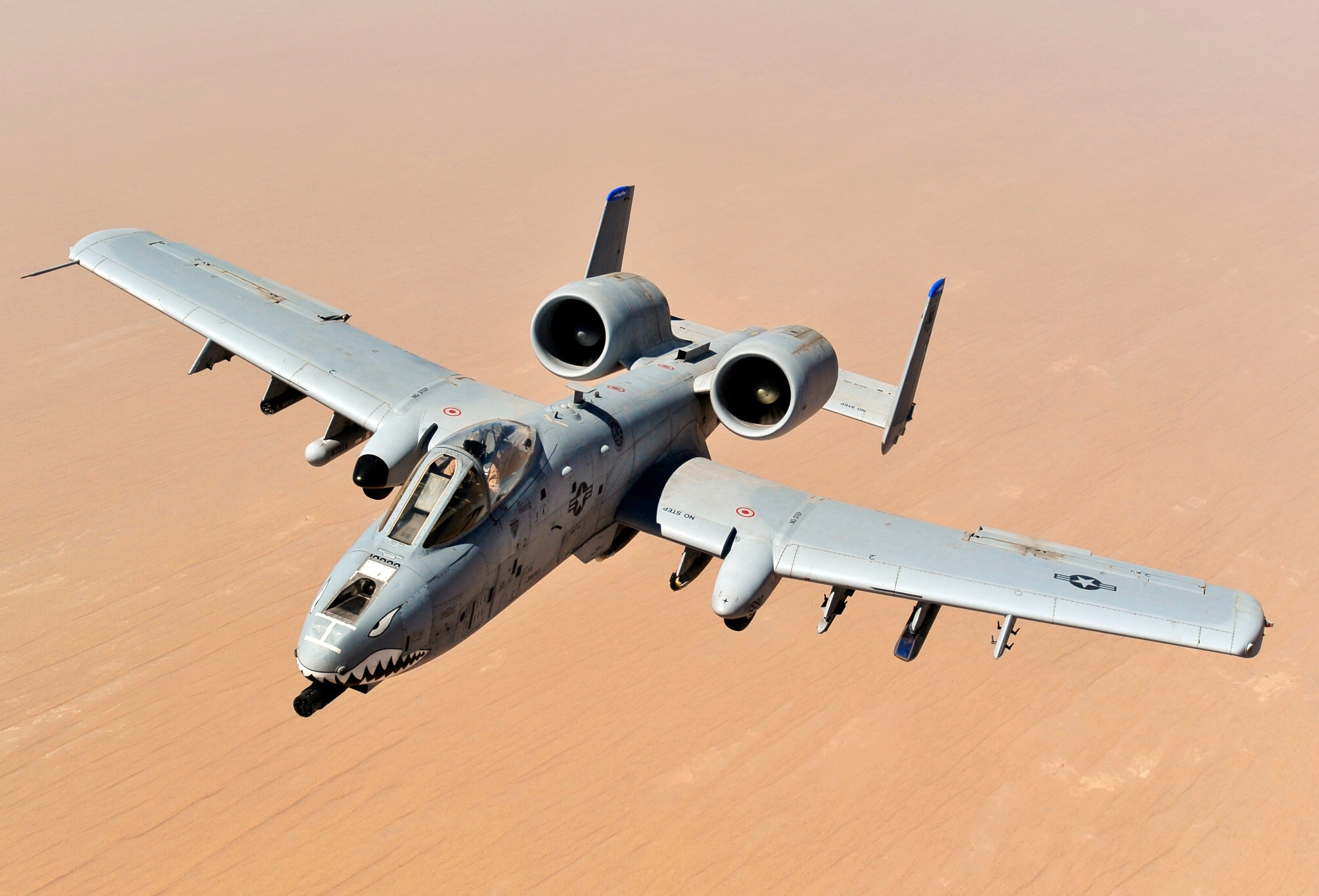
- An A-10 of the 74th Fighter Squadron after taking on fuel over Afghanistan in 2011

General information
- Type: Close air support attack aircraft
- National origin: United States
- Manufacturer: Fairchild Republic
- Status: In service
- Primary user: United States Air Force
- Number built: 716

History
- Manufactured: 1972–1984
- Introduction date: October 1977
- First flight: 10 May 1972 (54 years ago)

The Fairchild Republic A-10 Thunderbolt II, also widely known by the nickname Warthog, is a single-seat, twin-turbofan, straight-wing, subsonic attack aircraft developed by Fairchild Republic for the United States Air Force (USAF). In service since 1977, it is named after the Republic P-47 Thunderbolt strike-fighter of World War II, but is commonly referred to as the "Warthog". The A-10 was designed to provide close air support (CAS) to ground troops by attacking enemy armored vehicles, tanks, and other ground forces; it is the only production-built aircraft designed solely for CAS to have served with the U.S. Air Force. Its secondary missions include combat search and rescue, and to direct other aircraft in attacks on ground targets, a role called forward air controller (FAC)-airborne; aircraft used primarily in this role are designated OA-10. It also performs reconnaissance, air interdiction, and maritime surface warfare missions.

The A-10 was intended to improve on the performance and firepower of the Douglas A-1 Skyraider. The Thunderbolt II's airframe was designed around the high-power 30 mm GAU-8 Avenger rotary autocannon. The airframe was designed for durability, with measures such as 1,200 pounds (540 kg) of titanium armor to protect the cockpit and aircraft systems, enabling it to absorb damage and continue flying. Its ability to take off and land from relatively short and unpaved runways permits operation from airstrips close to the front lines, and its simple design enables maintenance with minimal facilities.

It served in Operation Urgent Fury in Grenada, the Gulf War (Operation Desert Storm), the Yugoslav Wars, war in Afghanistan, the Iraq War, in the conflict against the Islamic State in the Middle East, Operation Odyssey Dawn in Libya, and the 2026 Iran war.

The A-10A single-seat variant was the only version produced, though one pre-production airframe was modified into the YA-10B twin-seat prototype to test an all-weather night-capable version. In 2005, a program was started to upgrade the remaining A-10A aircraft to the A-10C configuration, with modern avionics for use with precision weaponry. The U.S. Air Force had stated the Lockheed Martin F-35 Lightning II would replace the A-10 as it entered service, but this remains highly contentious within the USAF and in political circles. The USAF gained congressional permission to start retiring A-10s in 2023, but further retirements were paused until the USAF can demonstrate that the A-10's close-air-support capabilities can be replaced.

== Development ==
=== Background ===
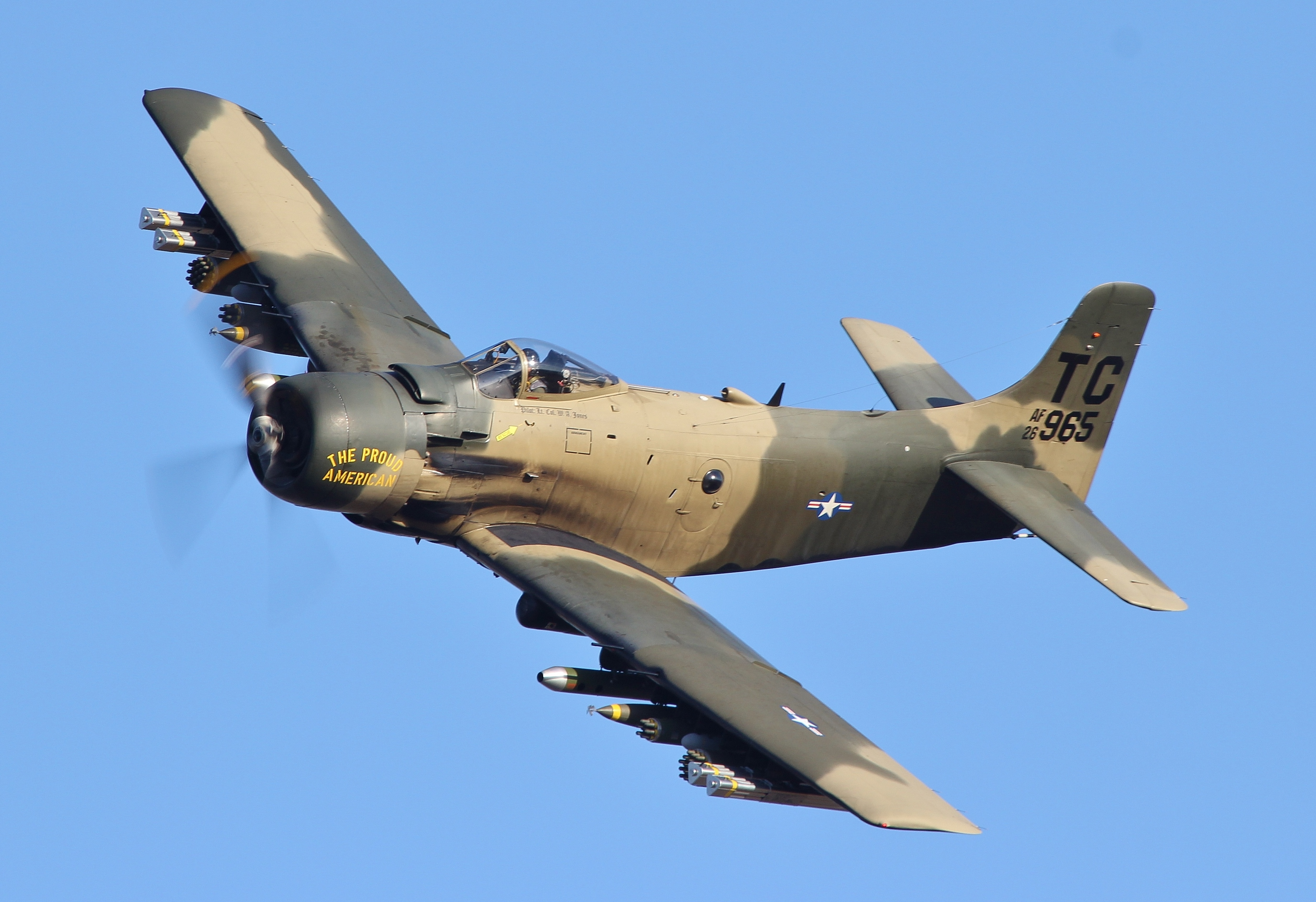
By the time of the Vietnam War, the 1940s-vintage propeller-driven Skyraider was the USAF's only dedicated close air support aircraft. It was slow, vulnerable to ground fire, and relatively lightly armed.

The development of conventionally armed attack aircraft in the United States stagnated after World War II, as design efforts for tactical aircraft focused on the delivery of nuclear weapons using high-speed designs such as the McDonnell F-101 Voodoo and Republic F-105 Thunderchief. As the U.S. military entered the Vietnam War, its main ground-attack aircraft was the Korean War-era Douglas A-1 Skyraider. A capable aircraft for its era, with a relatively large payload and long loiter time, the propeller-driven design had become relatively slow, vulnerable, particularly to ground fire, and incapable of providing adequate firepower. The U.S. Air Force and Navy lost some 266 A-1s in action in Vietnam, largely from small-arms fire.

The lack of modern conventional attack capability prompted calls for a specialized attack aircraft. On 7 June 1961, the Secretary of Defense Robert McNamara ordered the USAF to develop two tactical aircraft, one for the long-range strike and interdictor role, and the other focusing on the fighter-bomber mission. The former was the Tactical Fighter Experimental (TFX) intended to be a common design for the USAF and the US Navy, which emerged as the General Dynamics F-111 Aardvark, while the second was filled by a version of the U.S. Navy's McDonnell Douglas F-4 Phantom II. While the Phantom went on to be one of the most successful fighter designs of the 1960s and proved to be a capable fighter-bomber, its short loiter time was a major problem, as was its poor low-speed performance, albeit to a lesser extent. It was also expensive to buy and operate, with a flyaway cost of $2 million in FY1965 ($20.4 million today), and operational costs over $900 per hour ($9,000 per hour today).

After a broad review of its tactical force structure, the USAF decided to adopt a low-cost aircraft to supplement the F-4 and F-111. It first focused on the Northrop F-5, which had air-to-air capability. A 1965 cost-effectiveness study shifted the focus from the F-5 to the less expensive A-7D variant of the LTV A-7 Corsair II, and a contract was awarded. However, this aircraft doubled in cost with demands for an upgraded engine and new avionics.

=== Army helicopter competition ===
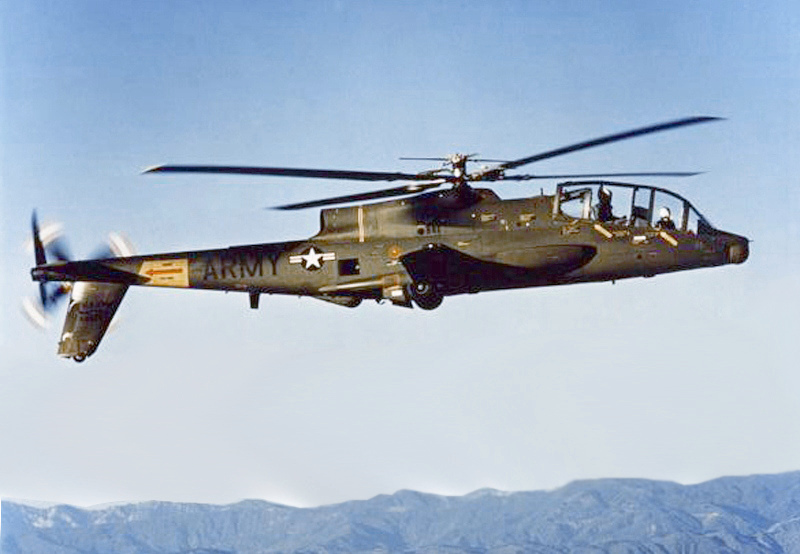
The Lockheed AH-56 Cheyenne appeared to offer the possibility of handing much of the tactical air-to-ground role to the U.S. Army.

During this period, the United States Army had been introducing the Bell UH-1 Iroquois into service. First used in its intended role as a transport, it was soon modified in the field to carry more machine guns in what became known as the helicopter gunship role. This proved effective against the lightly armed enemy, and new gun and rocket pods were added. Soon the Bell AH-1 Cobra was introduced. This was an attack helicopter armed with long-range BGM-71 TOW missiles able to destroy tanks from outside the range of defensive fire. The helicopter was effective and prompted the U.S. military to change its defensive strategy in Europe into blunting any Warsaw Pact advance with anti-tank helicopters instead of the tactical nuclear weapons that had been the basis for NATO's battle plans since the 1950s.

The Cobra was a quickly-made helicopter based on the UH-1 Iroquois and was introduced in the mid-1960s as an interim design until the U.S. Army's "Advanced Aerial Fire Support System" helicopter could be delivered. The Army selected the Lockheed AH-56 Cheyenne, a more capable attack aircraft with greater speed for initial production. The development of the anti-tank helicopter concerned the USAF; a 1966 USAF study of existing close air support (CAS) capabilities revealed gaps in the escort and fire suppression roles that the Cheyenne could fill. The study concluded that the service should acquire a simple, inexpensive, dedicated CAS aircraft at least as capable as the A-1, and that it should develop doctrine, tactics, and procedures for such aircraft to accomplish the missions for which the attack helicopters were provided.

=== A-X program ===
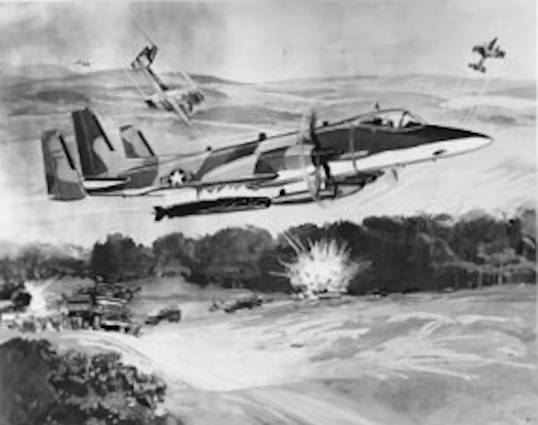
A-X Attack aircraft concept

On 8 September 1966, General John P. McConnell, Chief of Staff of the USAF, ordered that a specialized CAS aircraft be designed, developed, and obtained. On 22 December, a Requirements Action Directive was issued for the A-X CAS airplane, and the Attack Experimental (A-X) program office was formed. On 6 March 1967, the USAF released a request for information to 21 defense contractors for the A-X.

In May 1970, the USAF issued a modified, more detailed request for proposals for the aircraft. The threat of Soviet armored forces and all-weather attack operations had become more serious. The requirements now included that the aircraft would be designed specifically for the 30 mm rotary cannon. The RFP also specified a maximum speed of 460 mph (400 kn; 740 km/h), takeoff distance of 4,000 feet (1,200 m), external load of 16,000 pounds (7,300 kg), 285-mile (460 km) mission radius, and a unit cost of US$1.4 million ($11.6 million today). The A-X would be the first USAF aircraft designed exclusively for CAS. During this time, a separate RFP was released for A-X's 30 mm cannon with requirements for a high rate of fire (4,000 rounds per minute) and a high muzzle velocity. Six companies submitted aircraft proposals, with Northrop and Fairchild Republic in Germantown, Maryland, selected to build prototypes: the YA-9A and YA-10A, respectively. General Electric and Philco-Ford were selected to build and test GAU-8 cannon prototypes.

Two YA-10 prototypes were built in the Republic factory in Farmingdale, New York, and first flown on 10 May 1972 by pilot Howard "Sam" Nelson. Production A-10s were built by Fairchild in Hagerstown, Maryland. After trials and a fly-off against the YA-9, on 18 January 1973, the USAF announced the YA-10's selection for production. General Electric was selected to build the GAU-8 cannon in June 1973. The YA-10 had an additional fly-off in 1974 against the Ling-Temco-Vought A-7D Corsair II, the principal USAF attack aircraft at the time, to prove the need for a new attack aircraft. The first production A-10 flew in October 1975, and deliveries commenced in March 1976.

One experimental two-seat A-10 Night Adverse Weather (N/AW) version was built by Fairchild by converting the first Demonstration Testing and Evaluation (DT&E) A-10A for consideration by the USAF. It included a second seat for a weapon systems officer responsible for electronic countermeasures (ECM), navigation and target acquisition. The N/AW version did not interest the USAF or export customers. The two-seat trainer version was ordered by the USAF in 1981, but funding was canceled by U.S. Congress and was not produced. The only two-seat A-10 resides at Edwards Air Force Base's Flight Test Center Museum.

=== Production ===
On 10 February 1976, Deputy Secretary of Defense Bill Clements authorized full-rate production while the first A-10 was accepted by the USAF Tactical Air Command on 30 March 1976. Production continued and reached a peak rate of 13 aircraft per month. By 1984, 715 airplanes, including 2 prototypes and 6 development aircraft, had been delivered.

When full-rate production was first authorized, the A-10's planned service life was 6,000 hours. A small design reinforcement was quickly adopted when initial fatigue testing failed at 80% of testing; the A-10 passed fatigue tests with the fix. 8,000-flight-hour service lives were becoming common at the time, so fatigue testing of the A-10 continued with a new 8,000-hour target. Testing to this new level quickly discovered serious cracks at Wing Station 23 (WS23) where the outboard portions of the wings are joined to the fuselage. The first production change was to address this problem by adding cold working at WS23. Soon after, the USAF found that the real-world A-10 fleet fatigue was harsher than estimated, forcing a change to fatigue testing and introduced "spectrum 3" equivalent flight-hour testing.

Spectrum 3 fatigue testing started in 1979. This round of testing quickly determined that more drastic reinforcement would be needed. The second change in production, starting with aircraft No. 442, was to increase the thickness of the lower skin on the outer wing panels. A tech order was issued to retrofit the "thick skin" to the whole fleet, but the tech order was rescinded after roughly 242 planes, leaving about 200 planes with the original "thin skin". Starting with aircraft No. 530, cold working at WS0 was performed, and this retrofit was performed on earlier aircraft. A fourth, even more drastic change was initiated with aircraft No. 582, again to address the problems discovered with spectrum 3 testing. This change increased the thickness of the lower skin on the center wing panel, but it required modifications to the lower spar caps to accommodate the thicker skin. The USAF found it economically unfeasible to retrofit earlier planes with this modification.

=== Upgrades ===
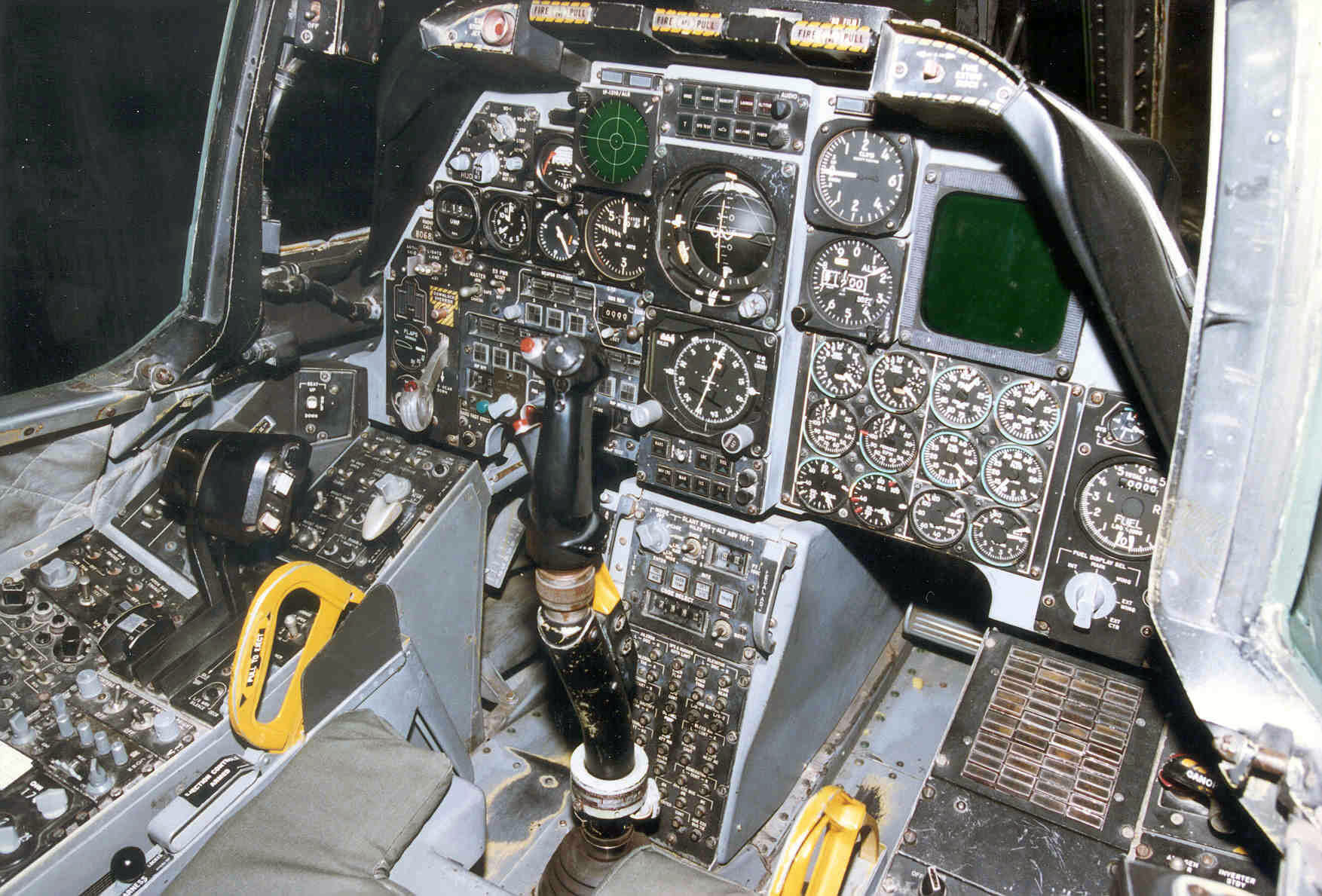
An A-10A of pre-glass cockpit design

The A-10 has received many upgrades since entering service. In 1978, it received the Pave Penny laser receiver pod, mounted on a pylon attached below the right side of the cockpit, which receives reflected laser radiation from laser designators to allow the aircraft to deliver laser-guided munitions. In 1980, the A-10 began receiving an inertial navigation system.

In the early 1990s, the A-10 began to receive the Low-Altitude Safety and Targeting Enhancement (LASTE) upgrade, which provided computerized weapon-aiming equipment, an autopilot, and a ground-collision warning system. In 1999, aircraft began receiving Global Positioning System navigation systems and a multi-function display. The LASTE system was upgraded with an Integrated Flight & Fire Control Computer (IFFCC).

Proposed further upgrades included integrated combat search and rescue locator systems and improved early warning and anti-jam self-protection systems, and the USAF recognized that the A-10's engine power was sub-optimal and had planned to replace them with more powerful engines since at least 2001 at an estimated cost of $2 billion.

==== HOG UP and wing replacement program ====
In 1987, Grumman Aerospace took over support for the A-10 program. In 1993, Grumman updated the damage tolerance assessment and Force Structural Maintenance Plan and Damage Threat Assessment. Over the next few years, problems with wing structure fatigue, first noticed in production years earlier, began to come to the fore. Implementation of the maintenance plan was greatly delayed by the base realignment and closure commission (BRAC), which led to 80% of the original workforce being let go.

During inspections in 1995 and 1996, cracks at the WS23 location were found on many A-10s; while many were in line with updated predictions from 1993, two of these were classified as "near-critical" size, well beyond predictions. In August 1998, Grumman produced a new plan to address these issues and increase life span to 16,000 hours. This led to the "HOG UP" program, which commenced in 1999. Additional aspects were added to HOG UP over time, including new fuel bladders, flight control system changes, and engine nacelle inspections. In 2001, the cracks were reclassified as "critical", which meant they were considered repairs and not upgrades, which allowed bypassing normal acquisition channels for more rapid implementation. An independent review of the HOG UP program, presented in September 2003, concluded that the data on which the wing upgrade relied could no longer be trusted. Shortly thereafter, fatigue testing on a test wing failed prematurely and also mounting problems with wings failing in-service inspections at an increasing rate became apparent. The USAF estimated that they would run out of wings by 2011. Of the plans explored, replacing the wings with new ones was the least expensive, at an initial cost of $741 million and a total cost of $1.72 billion over the program's life.

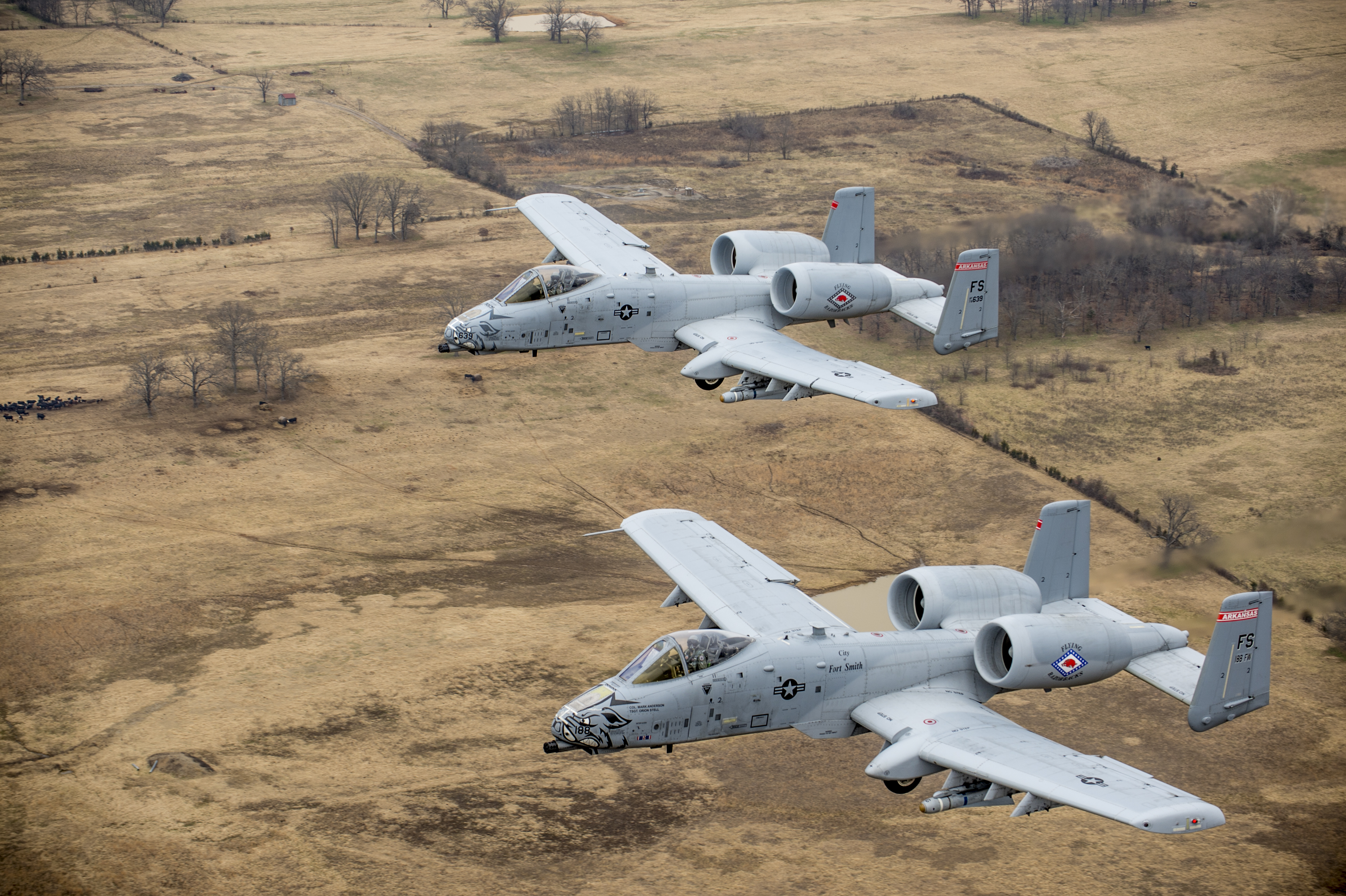
Two A-10s in formation

In 2005, a business case was produced with three options to extend the fleet's life. The first two options involved expanding the service life extension program (SLEP) at a cost of $4.6 billion and $3.16 billion, respectively. The third option, worth $1.72 billion, was to build 242 new wings and avoid the need to expand the SLEP. In 2006, option 3 was chosen and Boeing won the contract. The base contract is for 117 wings with options for 125 additional wings. In 2013, the USAF exercised a portion of the option to add 56 wings, putting 173 wings on order with options remaining for 69 additional wings. In November 2011, two A-10s flew with the new wings fitted. The new wings improved mission readiness, decreased maintenance costs, and allowed the A-10 to be operated up to 2035 if necessary. Re-winging work was organized under the Thick-skin Urgent Spares Kitting (TUSK) Program.

In 2014, as part of plans to retire the A-10, the USAF considered halting the wing replacement program to save an additional $500 million; however, by May 2015 the re-winging program was too advanced to be financially efficient to cancel. Boeing stated in February 2016 that the A-10 could operate to 2040 with the new TUSK wings.

==== Modernization (A-10C) ====
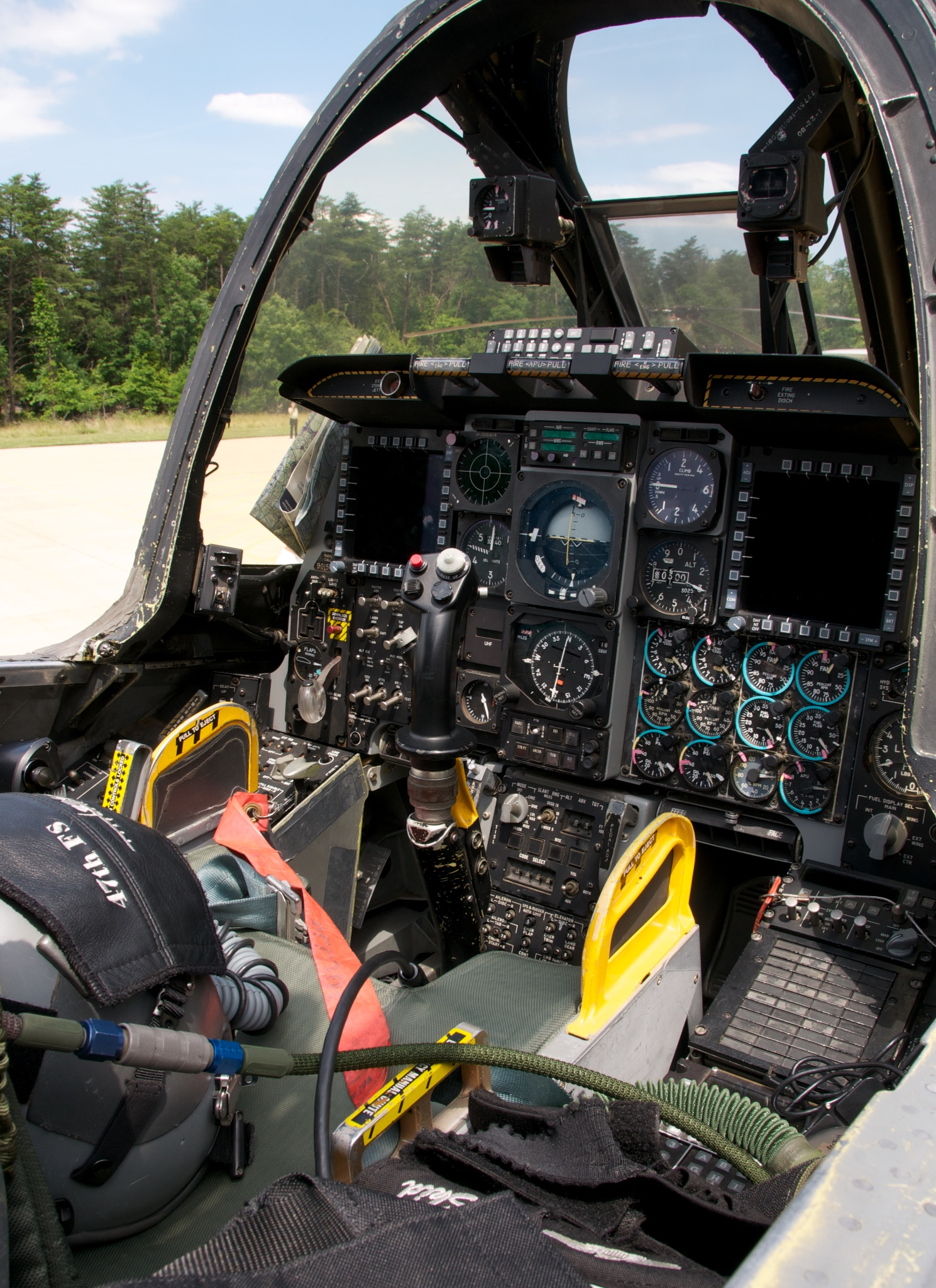
A-10C cockpit at the Smithsonian National Air and Space Museum, 2012

From 2005 to June 2011, the entire fleet of 356 A-10s and OA-10s were modernized in the Precision Engagement program and redesignated A-10C. Upgrades included all-weather combat capability, an improved fire-control system (FCS), electronic countermeasures (ECM), smart bomb targeting, a modern communications suite including a Link 16 radio and Satcom, and cockpit upgrades comprising two multifunction displays and HOTAS configuration mixing the F-16's flight stick with the F-15's throttle. The Government Accountability Office in 2007 estimated the cost of upgrading, refurbishing, and service life extension plans to total $2.25 billion through 2013. In July 2010, the USAF issued Raytheon a contract to integrate a Helmet Mounted Integrated Targeting (HMIT) system into the A-10C. The LASTE system was replaced with the integrated flight and fire control computer (IFFCC) included in the PE upgrade.

Throughout its life, multiple software upgrades have been made. While this work was to be stopped under plans to retire the A-10 in February 2014, Secretary of the Air Force Deborah Lee James ordered that the latest upgrade, designated Suite 8, continue in response to congressional pressure. Suite 8 software includes IFF Mode 5, which modernizes the ability to identify the A-10 to friendly units. Additionally, the Pave Penny pods and pylons were removed as their receive-only capability has been replaced by the AN/AAQ-28(V)4 LITENING AT targeting pods or Sniper XR targeting pod, which both have laser designators and laser rangefinders.

In 2012, Air Combat Command requested the testing of a 600-US-gallon (2,300 L; 500 imp gal) external fuel tank which would extend the A-10's loitering time by 45–60 minutes; flight testing of such a tank had been conducted in 1997 but did not involve combat evaluation. Over 30 flight tests were conducted by the 40th Flight Test Squadron to gather data on the aircraft's handling characteristics and performance across different load configurations. It was reported that the tank slightly reduced stability in the yaw axis, but there was no decrease in aircraft tracking performance.

== Design ==
=== Overview ===
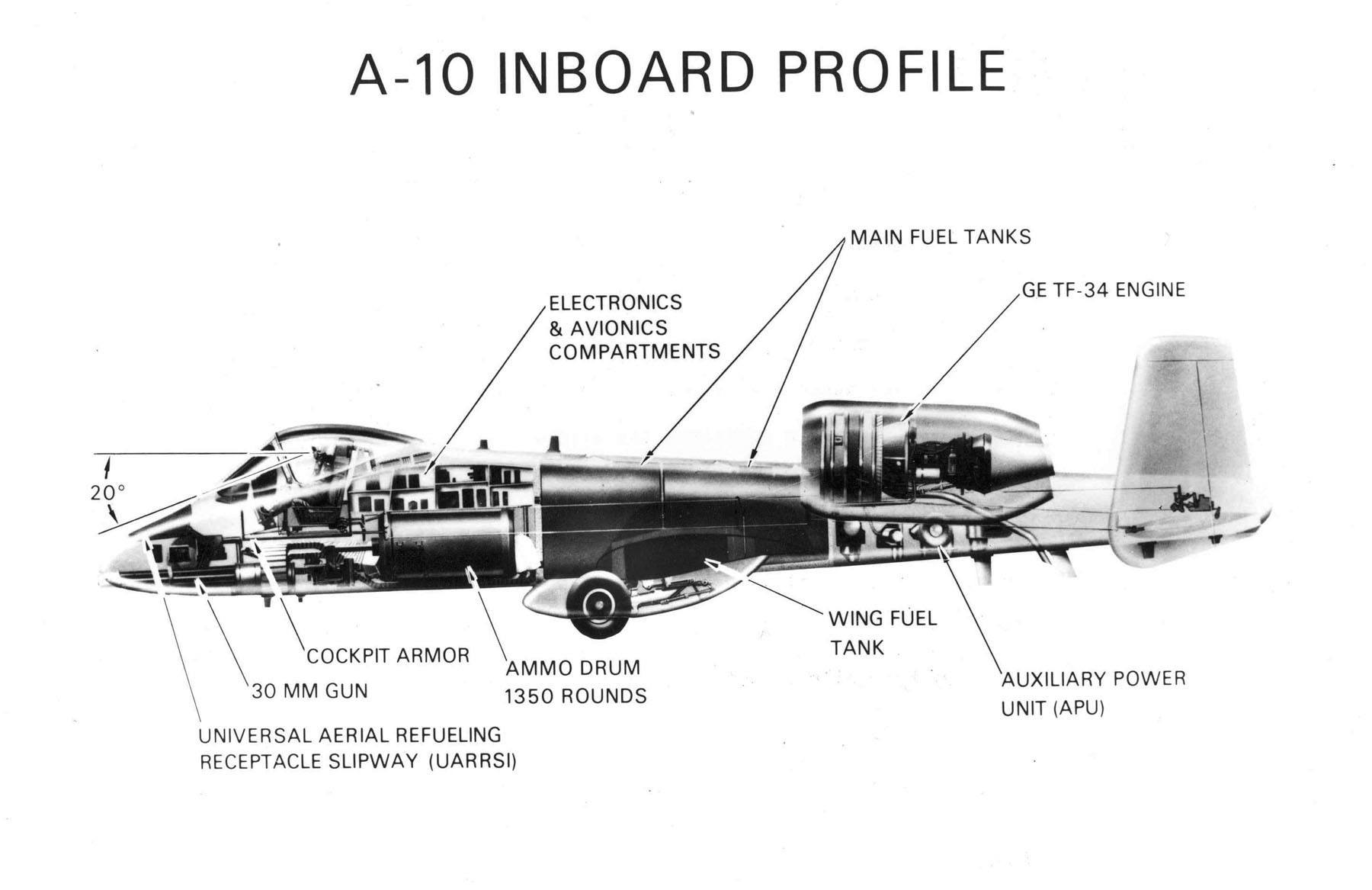
A-10 inboard profile drawing

The A-10 has a cantilever low-wing monoplane wing with a wide chord. It has superior maneuverability at low speeds and altitude due to its large wing area, high wing aspect ratio, and large ailerons. The wing also allows short takeoffs and landings, permitting operations from austere forward airfields near front lines. The A-10 can loiter for extended periods and operate under 1,000-foot (300 m) ceilings with 1.5-mile (2.4 km) visibility. It typically flies at a relatively low speed of 300 knots (350 mph; 560 km/h), which makes it a better platform for the ground-attack role than fast fighter-bombers, which often have difficulty targeting small, slow-moving targets.

The leading edge of the wing has a honeycomb structure panel construction, providing strength with minimal weight; similar panels cover the flap shrouds, elevators, rudders and sections of the fins. The skin panels are integral with the stringers and are fabricated using computer-controlled machining, reducing production time and cost. Combat experience has shown that this type of panel is more resistant to damage. The skin is not load-bearing, so damaged skin sections can be easily replaced in the field, with makeshift materials if necessary. The ailerons are at the far ends of the wings for greater rolling moment and have two distinguishing features: The ailerons are larger than is typical, almost 50 percent of the wingspan, providing improved control even at slow speeds; the aileron is also split, making it a deceleron.

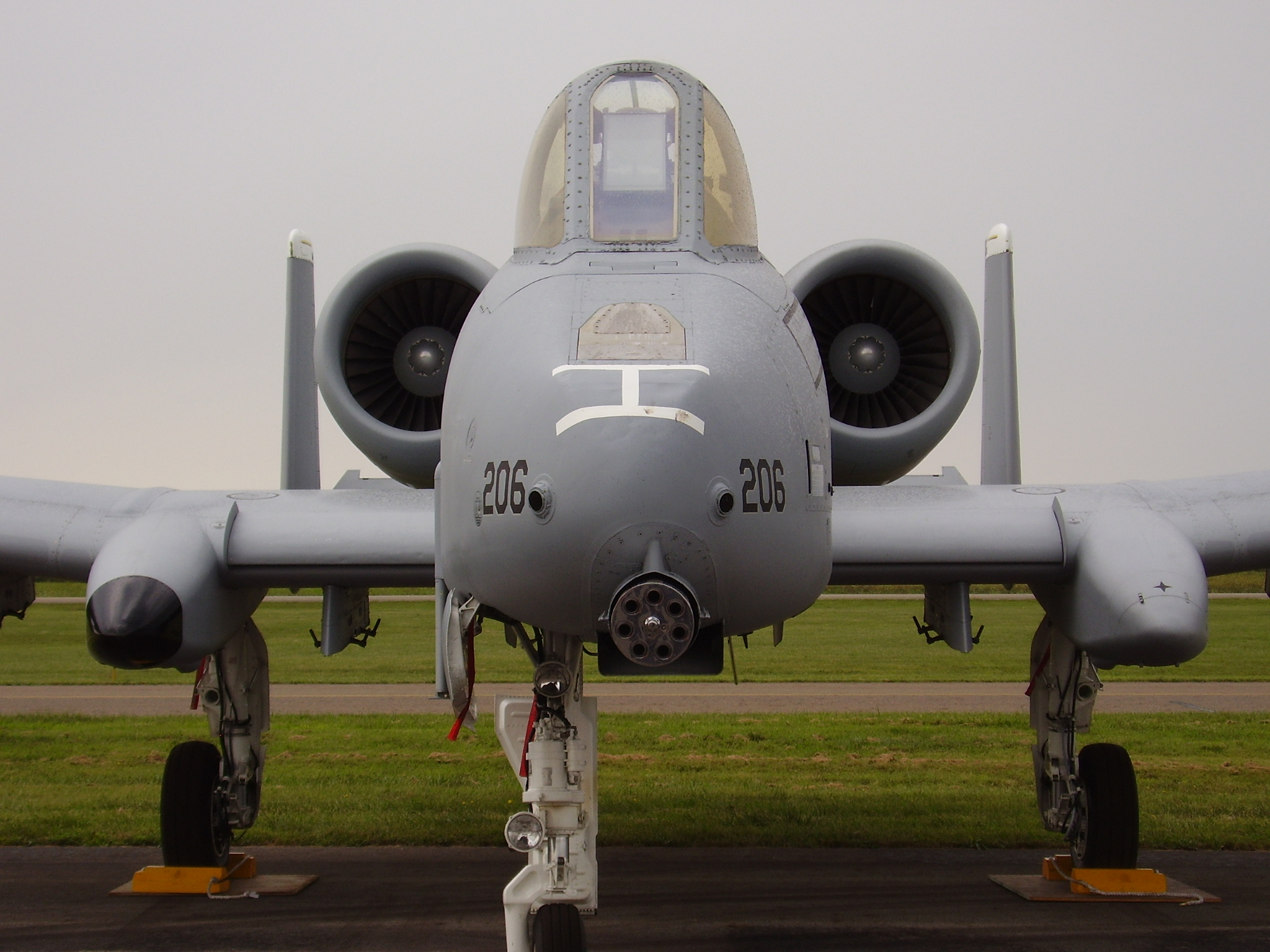
Front view of an A-10. The offset front landing gear is to accommodate the 30 mm cannon.

The A-10 is designed to be refueled, rearmed, and serviced with minimal equipment. Its simple design enables maintenance at forward bases with limited facilities. An unusual feature is that many of the aircraft's parts are interchangeable between the left and right sides, including the engines, main landing gear, and vertical stabilizers. The sturdy landing gear, low-pressure tires and large, straight wings allow operation from short rough strips even with a heavy aircraft ordnance load, allowing the aircraft to operate from damaged airbases, flying from taxiways, or even straight roadway sections.

The front landing gear is offset to the aircraft's right to allow placement of the 30 mm cannon with its firing barrel along the centerline of the aircraft. During ground taxi, the offset front landing gear causes the A-10 to have dissimilar turning radii; turning to the right on the ground takes less distance than turning left. (Note: With the inner wheel on a turn stopped, the minimum radius of the turn is dictated by the distance between the inner wheel and the nose wheel. Since the distance is less between the right main wheel and the nose gear than the same measurement on the left, the aircraft can turn more tightly to the right.) The wheels of the main landing gear partially protrude from their nacelles when retracted, making gear-up belly landings easier to control and less damaging. All landing gears retract forward; if hydraulic power is lost, a combination of gravity and aerodynamic drag can lower and lock the gear in place.

=== Survivability ===
The A-10 is able to survive direct hits from armor-piercing and high-explosive projectiles up to 23 mm. It has double-redundant hydraulic flight systems, and a mechanical system as a backup if hydraulics are lost. Flight without hydraulic power uses the manual reversion control system; pitch and yaw control engages automatically, and roll control is pilot-selected. In manual reversion mode, the A-10 is sufficiently controllable under favorable conditions to return to base, though control forces are greater than normal. It is designed to be able to fly with one engine, half of the tail, one elevator, and half of a wing missing. As the A-10 operates close to enemy positions, making it an easy target for man-portable air-defense system (MANPADS), surface-to-air missiles (SAMs), and enemy aircraft, it carries both flares and chaff cartridges.

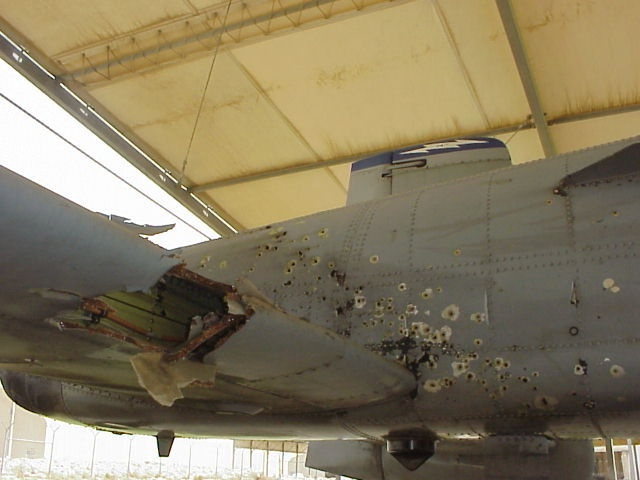
This A-10 took heavy damage during Operation Iraqi Freedom in 2003, including to the hydraulic system, and pilot Captain Kim Campbell safely flew it back to base on manual reversion mode.

The cockpit and parts of the flight-control systems are protected by 1,200 lb (540 kg) of titanium aircraft armor, referred to as a "bathtub". The armor has been tested to withstand strikes from 23 mm (0.91 in) High Explosive (HE) and Armour Piercing cannon fire, 37mm HE and some indirect hits from 57 mm (2.2 in) shell fragments. It is made up of titanium plates with thicknesses varying from 0.5 to 1.5 inches (13 to 38 mm) determined by a study of likely trajectories and deflection angles. The armor makes up almost six percent of the A-10's empty weight. Any interior surface of the tub directly exposed to the pilot is covered by a multi-layer nylon spall shield to protect against shell fragmentation. The front windscreen and canopy are resistant to small arms fire. Its durability was demonstrated on 7 April 2003 when Captain Kim Campbell, while flying over Baghdad during the 2003 invasion of Iraq, suffered extensive flak damage that damaged one engine and crippled the hydraulic system, requiring the stabilizer and flight controls to be operated via manual reversion mode. Despite this, Campbell's A-10 flew for nearly an hour and landed safely.

A-10C combat exercise at Nevada Test & Training Ground against hard targets

The A-10 was intended to fly from forward air bases and semi-prepared runways where foreign object damage to an aircraft's engines is normally a high risk. The unusual location of the General Electric TF34-GE-100 turbofan engines decreases ingestion risk and also allows the engines to run while the aircraft is serviced and rearmed by ground crews, reducing turn-around time. The wings are also mounted closer to the ground, simplifying servicing and rearming operations. The heavy engines require strong support: four bolts connect the engine pylons to the airframe. The engines' high 6:1 bypass ratio contributes to a relatively small infrared signature, and their position directs exhaust over the tailplanes further shielding it from detection by infrared homing surface-to-air missiles (SAM).

To reduce the likelihood of damage to the fuel system, all four fuel tanks are located near the aircraft's center and are separated from the fuselage; projectiles would need to penetrate the aircraft's skin before reaching a fuel tank's outer skin. Compromised fuel transfer lines self-seal; if damage exceeds a tank's self-sealing capabilities, check valves prevent fuel from flowing into a compromised tank. Most fuel system components are inside the tanks so component failure will not lead to fuel loss. The refueling system is also purged after use. Reticulated polyurethane foam lines both the inner and outer sides of the fuel tanks, retaining debris and restricting fuel spillage in the event of damage. The engines are shielded from the rest of the airframe by firewalls and fire extinguishing equipment. If all four main tanks were lost, two self-sealing sump tanks contain fuel for 230 miles (370 km) of flight.

=== Weapons ===
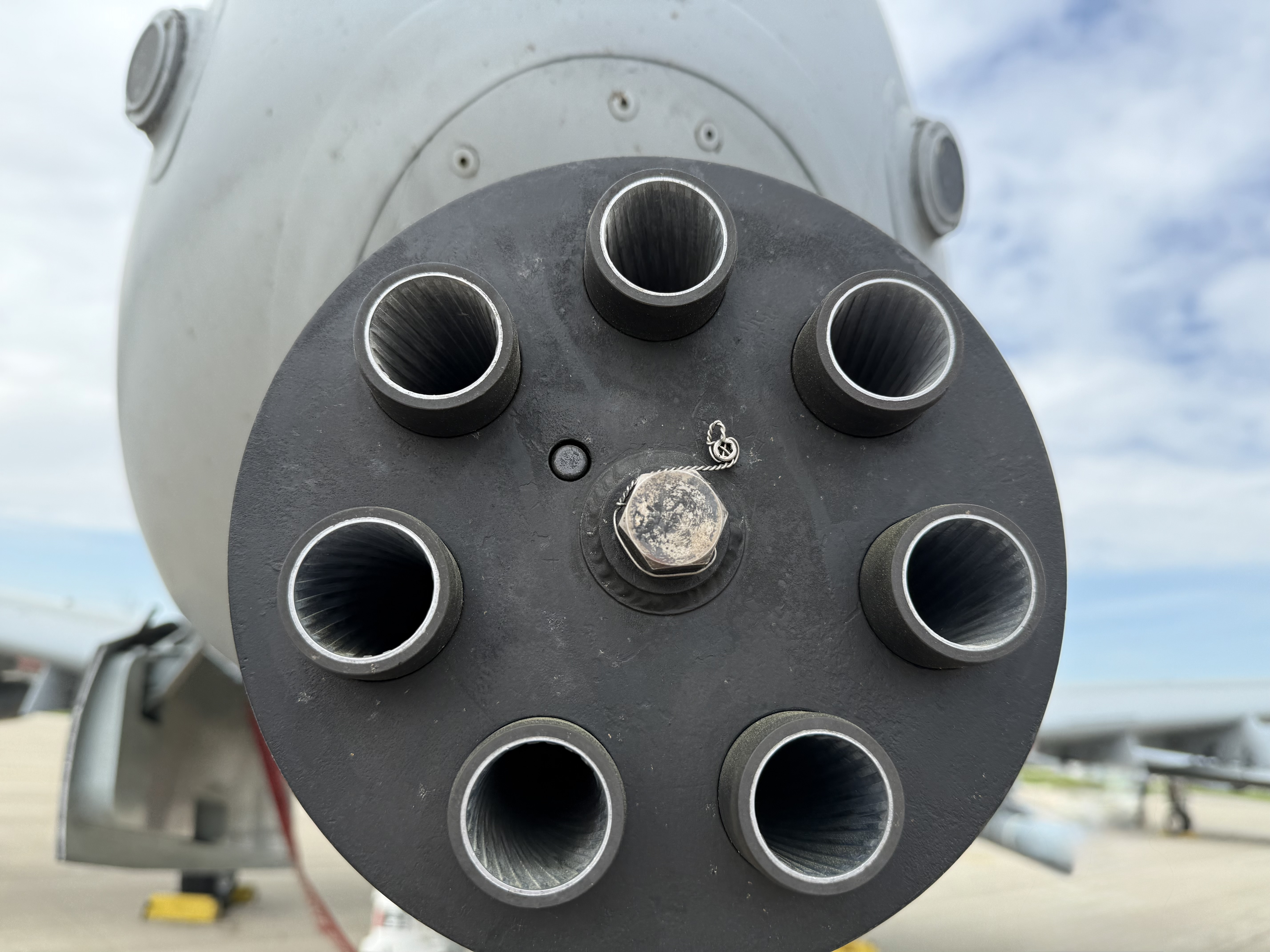
Closeup of the GAU-8/A cannon mounted in an A-10

The A-10's primary built-in weapon is the 30×173 mm GAU-8/A Avenger autocannon made by General Electric. One of the most powerful aircraft cannons ever flown, the GAU-8 is a hydraulically driven seven-barrel rotary cannon designed for the anti-tank role with a high rate of fire. The original design could be switched by the pilot to 2,100 or 4,200 depleted uranium armor-piercing shells per minute; this was later changed to a fixed rate of 3,900 rounds per minute. The cannon takes about a half second to spin up to its maximum rate of fire, firing 50 rounds during the first second, and 65 or 70 rounds per second thereafter. It is accurate enough to place 80 percent of its shots within a 40-foot (12.4 m) diameter circle from 4,000 feet (1,220 m) while in flight. The GAU-8 is optimized for a slant range of 4,000 feet (1,220 m) with the A-10 in a 30-degree dive.

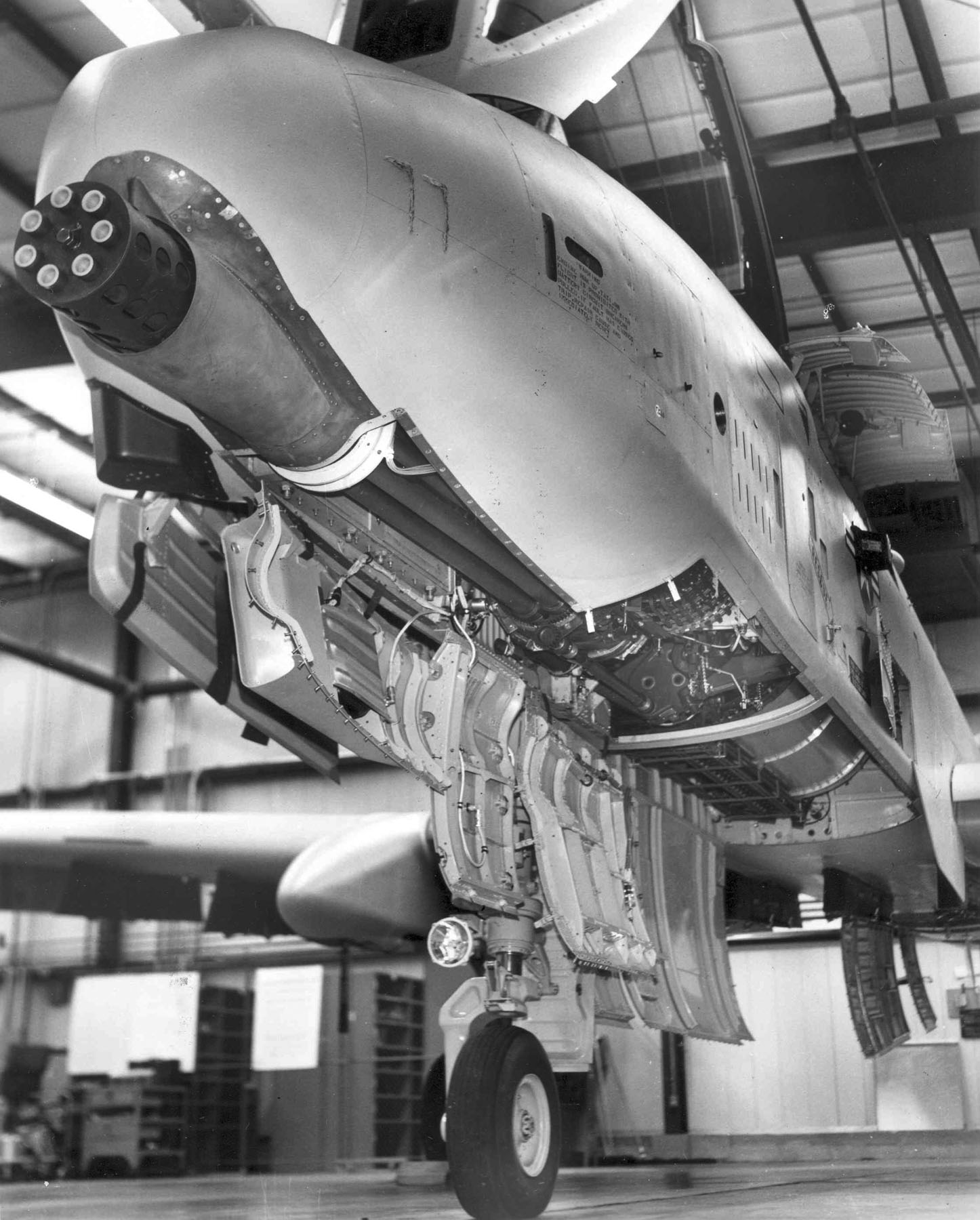
Front view of the A-10's GAU-8 installation

The aircraft's fuselage was designed around the cannon. The GAU-8 is mounted slightly to the port side; the barrel in the firing location is on the starboard side so it is aligned with the aircraft's centerline. The gun's 5-foot, 11.5-inch (1.816 m) ammunition drum can hold up to 1,350 rounds of 30 mm ammunition, but generally holds 1,174 rounds. To protect the rounds from enemy fire, armor plates of differing thicknesses between the aircraft skin and the drum are designed to detonate incoming shells.

The A-10 commonly carries the AGM-65 Maverick air-to-surface missile. Targeted via electro-optical (TV-guided) or infrared systems, the Maverick can hit targets much farther away than the cannon, and thus incur less risk from anti-aircraft systems. During Desert Storm, in the absence of dedicated forward-looking infrared (FLIR) cameras for night vision, the Maverick's infrared camera was used for night missions as a "poor man's FLIR". Other weapons include cluster bombs and Hydra 70 rocket pods. The A-10 is equipped to carry GPS- and laser-guided bombs, such as the GBU-39 Small Diameter Bomb, Paveway series bombs, Joint Direct Attack Munitions (JDAM), Wind Corrected Munitions Dispenser and AGM-154 Joint Standoff Weapon glide bombs. A-10s usually fly with an ALQ-131 Electronic countermeasures (ECM) pod under one wing and two AIM-9 Sidewinder air-to-air missiles for self-defense under the other wing.

=== Colors and markings ===
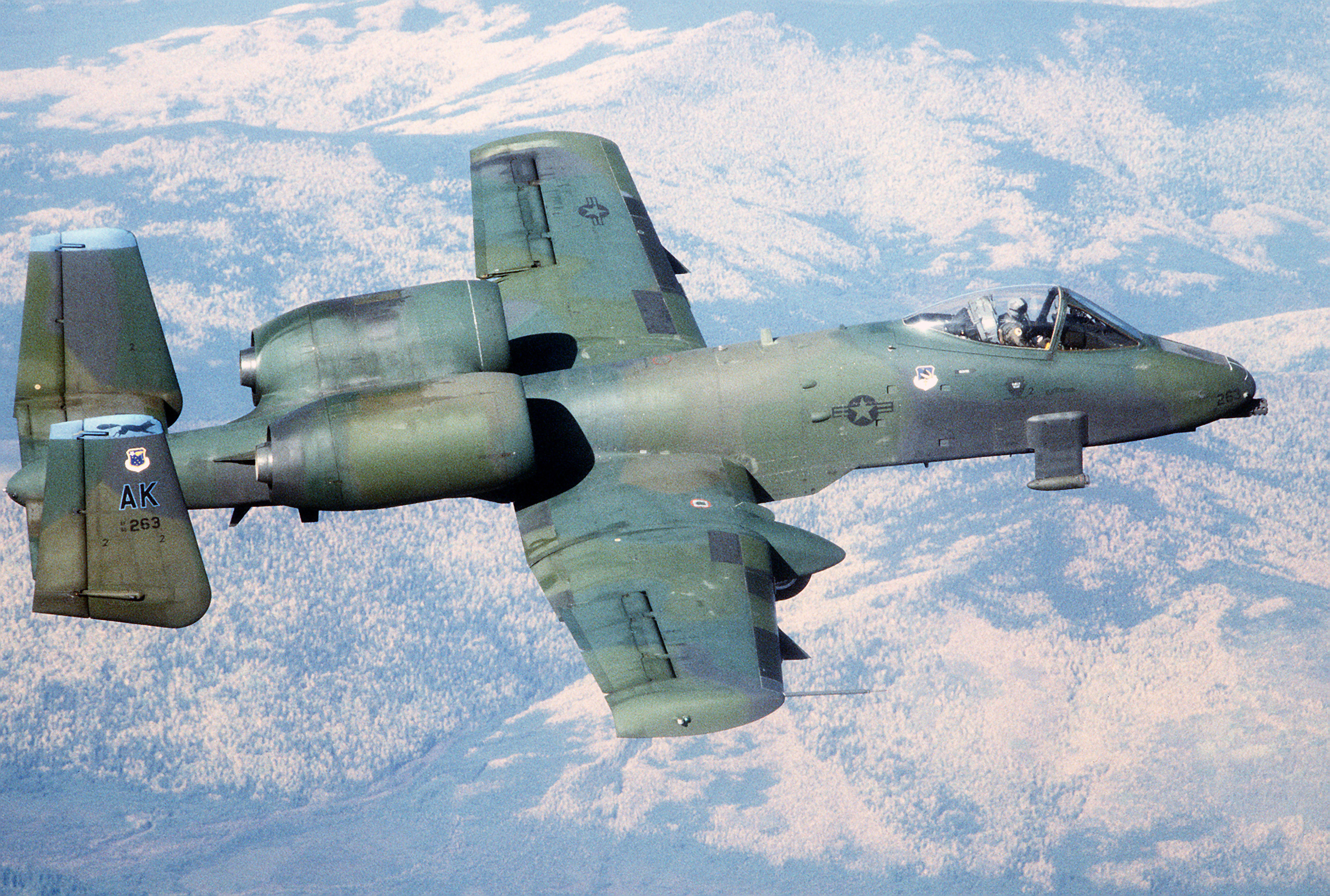
An A-10 from the 343rd Tactical Fighter Wing prepares to drop Mark 82 bombs at the Yukon Command Training Site in 1988.

Aircraft camouflage is used to make the A-10 more difficult to see as it flies low to the ground at subsonic speeds. Many types of paint schemes have been tried. These have included a "peanut scheme" of sand, yellow, and field drab; black and white colors for winter operations; and a tan, green, and brown mixed pattern. The most common Cold War-era scheme was the European I woodland camouflage, whose dark green, medium green, and dark gray was meant to blend in with the typical European forest terrain. It reflected the assumption that the threat from hostile fighter aircraft outweighed that from ground fire. After the 1991 Gulf War, the threat from ground fire was deemed more pressing than the air-to-air threat, leading to the "Compass Ghost" scheme with darker gray on top and a lighter gray on the underside of the aircraft.

Many A-10s also had a false canopy painted in dark gray on the underside of the aircraft, just behind the gun. This form of automimicry is an attempt to confuse the enemy as to aircraft attitude and maneuver direction. Several A-10s feature nose art, such as shark mouth or warthog head features.

== Operational history ==
=== Service entry ===
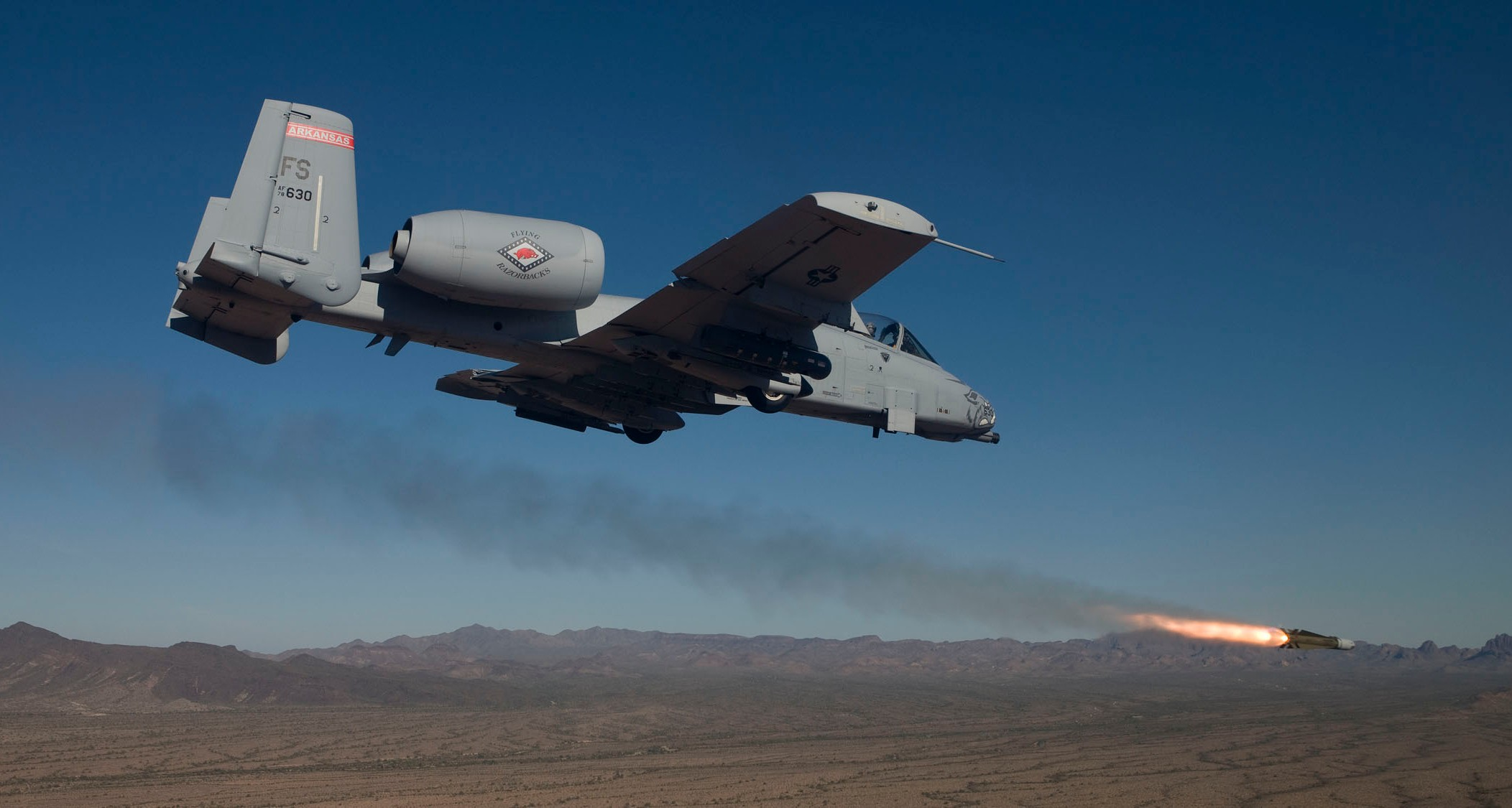
Arkansas Air National Guard A-10C firing an AGM-65 air-to-surface missile on a firing range at Davis–Monthan Air Force Base

The first unit to receive the A-10 was the 355th Tactical Training Wing, based at Davis-Monthan Air Force Base, Arizona, in March 1976. The first unit to achieve initial operating capability was the 354th Tactical Fighter Wing at Myrtle Beach Air Force Base, South Carolina, in October 1977. A-10 deployments followed at bases both at home and abroad, including England AFB, Louisiana; Eielson AFB, Alaska; Osan Air Base, South Korea; and RAF Bentwaters/RAF Woodbridge, England. The 81st TFW of RAF Bentwaters/RAF Woodbridge operated rotating detachments of A-10s at four bases in Germany known as Forward Operating Locations (FOLs): Leipheim, Sembach Air Base, Nörvenich Air Base, and RAF Ahlhorn. A-10s were initially an unwelcome addition to many in the USAF; most pilots did not want to switch to it as fighter pilots traditionally favored speed and appearance. In 1987, many A-10s were shifted to the forward air control (FAC) role and redesignated OA-10. In the FAC role, the OA-10 is typically equipped with up to six pods of 2.75-inch (70 mm) Hydra rockets, usually with smoke or white phosphorus warheads used for target marking. OA-10s are physically unchanged and remain fully combat capable despite the redesignation.

The 23rd TFW's A-10s were deployed to Bridgetown, Barbados, during Operation Urgent Fury, the 1983 American Invasion of Grenada. They provided air cover for the U.S. Marine Corps landings on the island of Carriacou in late October 1983, but did not fire weapons as no resistance was met.

=== Gulf War and Balkans ===
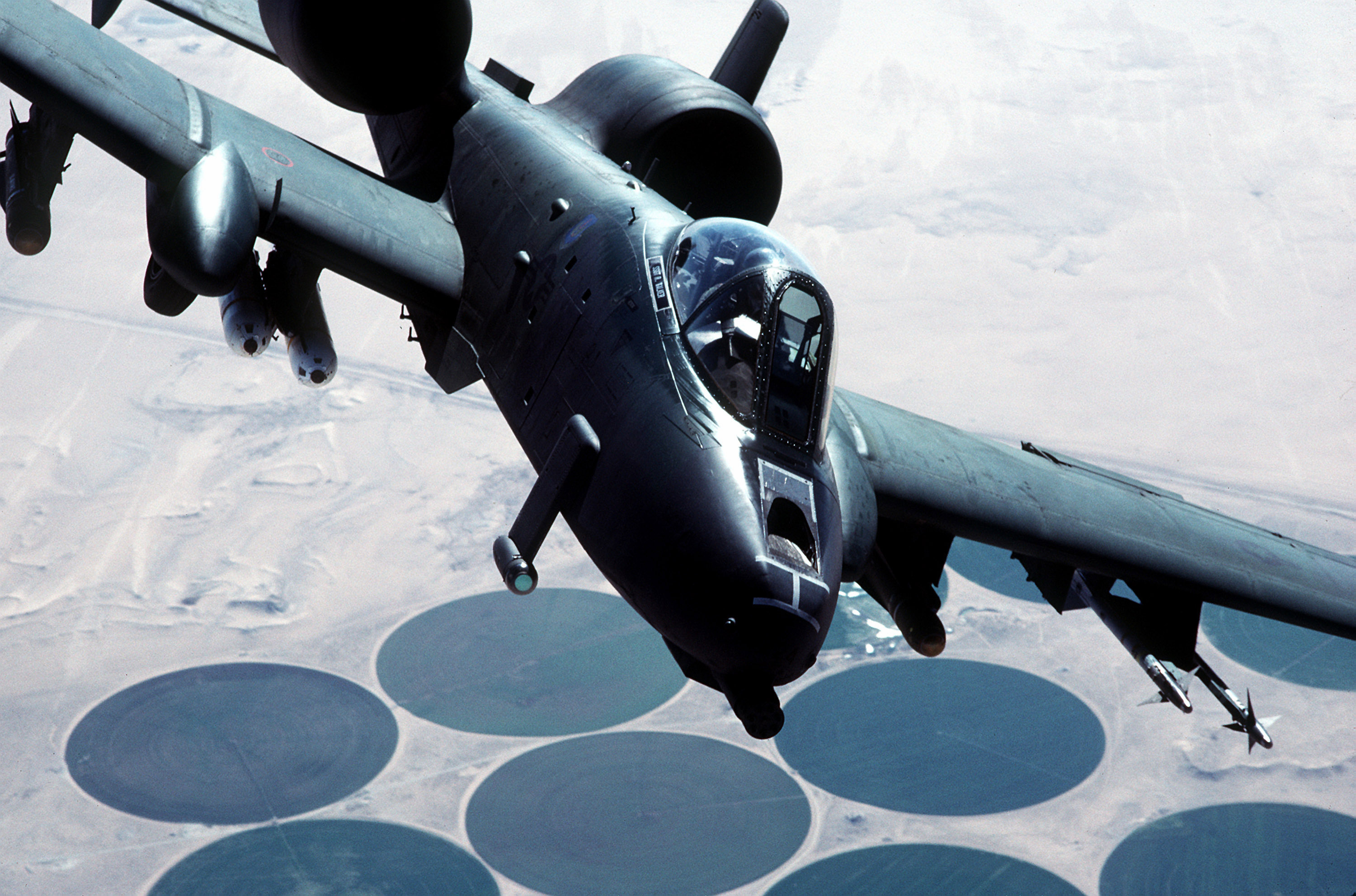
A-10A after Operation Desert Storm, 1992

The A-10 was used in combat for the first time during the Gulf War in 1991, with 132 being deployed. A-10s shot down two Iraqi helicopters with the GAU-8 cannon. The first of these was shot down by Captain Robert Swain over Kuwait on 6 February 1991 for the A-10's first air-to-air victory. Four A-10s were shot down during the war by surface-to-air missiles and eleven A-10s were hit by anti-air artillery rounds. Another two battle-damaged A-10s and OA-10As returned to base and were written off. Some sustained additional damage in crash landings. At the beginning of the war, A-10s flew missions against the Iraqi Republican Guard, but due to heavy attrition, from 15 February they were restricted to within 20 nautical miles (37 km) of the southern border. A-10s also flew missions hunting Iraqi Scud missiles. The A-10 had a mission capable rate of 95.7 percent, flew 8,100 sorties, and launched 90 percent of the AGM-65 Maverick missiles fired in the conflict. Shortly after the Gulf War, the USAF abandoned the idea of replacing the A-10 with a CAS version of the F-16.

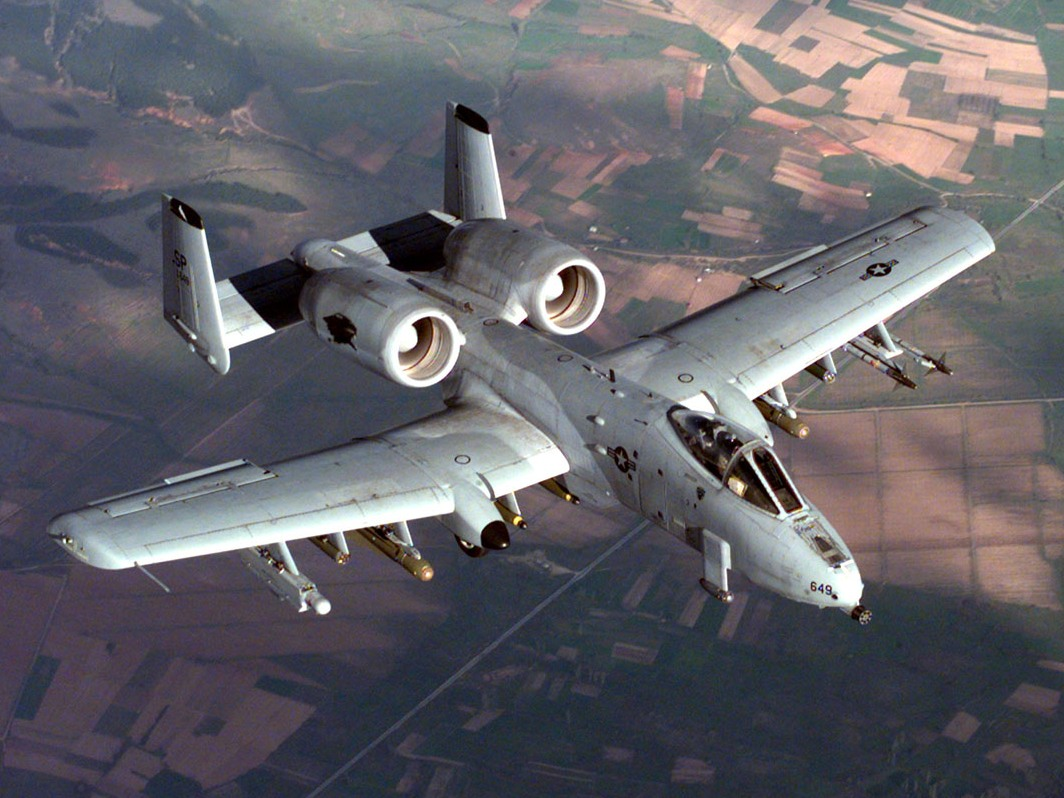
An A-10A during Operation Allied Force

A-10s fired approximately 10,000 30 mm rounds in Bosnia and Herzegovina in 1994–95. Following the seizure of heavy weapons by Bosnian Serbs from a warehouse in Ilidža, multiple sorties were launched to locate and destroy the captured equipment. On 5 August 1994, two A-10s located and strafed an anti-tank vehicle. Afterward, the Serbs agreed to return the remaining heavy weapons. In August 1995, NATO launched an offensive called Operation Deliberate Force. A-10s flew CAS missions, attacking Bosnian Serb artillery and positions. In late September, A-10s began flying patrols again.

A-10s returned to the Balkan region as part of Operation Allied Force in Kosovo beginning in March 1999. In March 1999, A-10s escorted and supported search and rescue helicopters in finding a downed F-117 pilot. The A-10s were deployed to support search and rescue missions, but gradually received more ground attack missions. The A-10's first successful attack in Operation Allied Force happened on 6 April 1999; A-10s remained in action until the end of combat in June 1999. Two A-10s were hit and damaged by enemy missiles over Kosovo during the campaign. One was hit on 2 May and had to make an emergency landing at Skopje International Airport while another was hit and lightly damaged on 11 May.

=== Recent deployments ===
During the 2001 invasion of Afghanistan, A-10s did not initially take part. Beginning in March 2002, A-10 squadrons were deployed to Pakistan and Bagram Air Base, Afghanistan for the campaign against Taliban and Al-Qaeda, known as Operation Anaconda. Afterward, they remained in-country, fighting Taliban and Al Qaeda remnants.

Operation Iraqi Freedom began on 20 March 2003. Sixty OA-10/A-10s took part in early combat. United States Air Forces Central Command issued Operation Iraqi Freedom: By the Numbers, a declassified report about the aerial campaign in the conflict on 30 April 2003. During the initial invasion of Iraq, A-10s had a mission capable rate of 85 percent and fired 311,597 rounds of 30 mm ammunition. The type also flew 32 missions to airdrop propaganda leaflets. A single A-10 was shot down near Baghdad International Airport by Iraqi fire late in the campaign.

In September 2007, the A-10C with the Precision Engagement Upgrade reached initial operating capability. The A-10C first deployed to Iraq in 2007 with the 104th Fighter Squadron of the Maryland Air National Guard. The A-10C's digital avionics and communications systems greatly reduced the time to acquire and attack CAS targets.

A-10s flew 32 percent of combat sorties in Operation Iraqi Freedom and Operation Enduring Freedom. These sorties ranged from 27,800 to 34,500 annually between 2009 and 2012. In the first half of 2013, they flew 11,189 sorties in Afghanistan. From the start of 2006 to October 2013, A-10s conducted 19 percent of CAS missions in Iraq and Afghanistan, more than the F-15E Strike Eagle and Rockwell B-1B Lancer, but less than the 33 percent flown by F-16s.

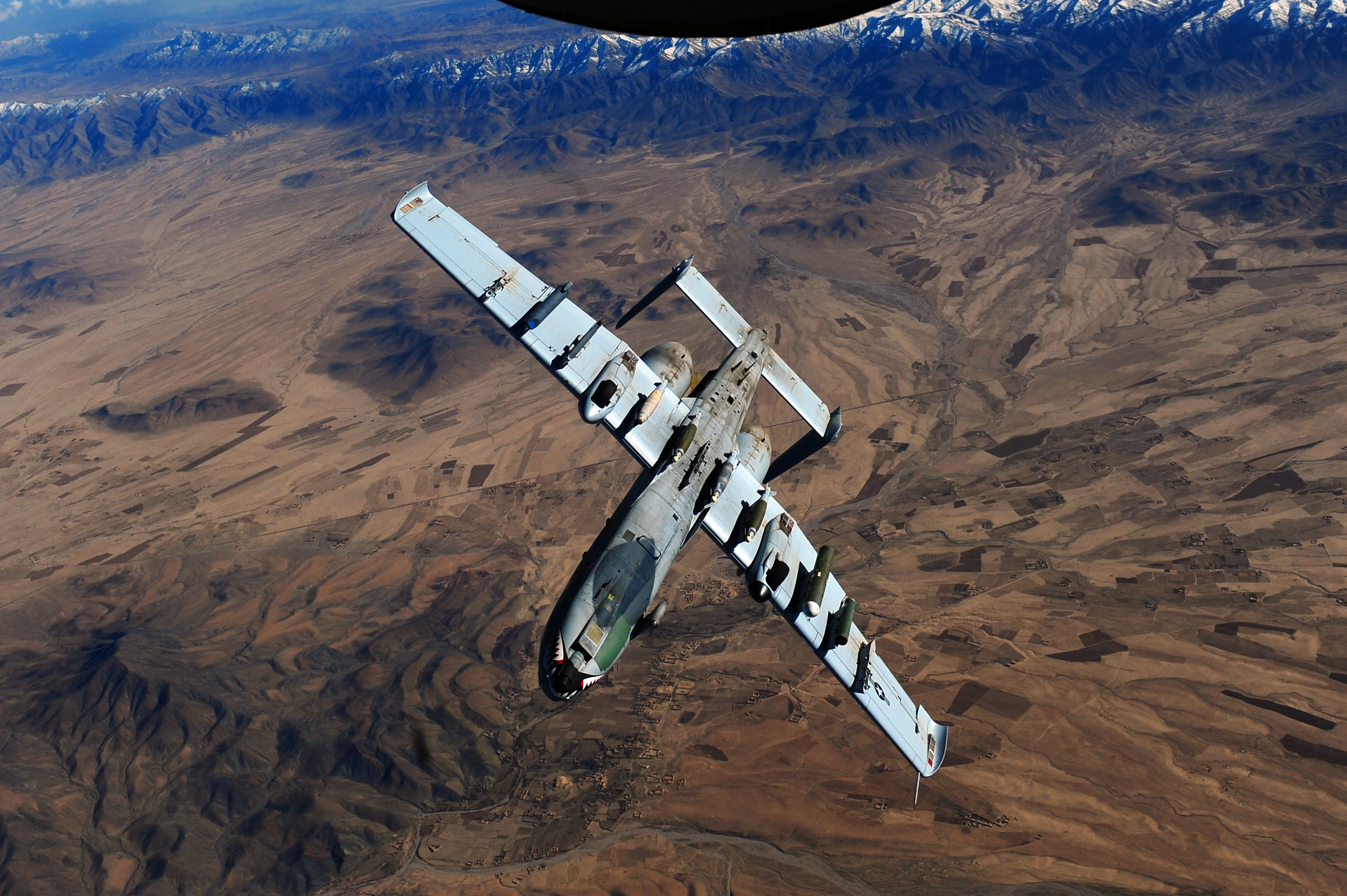
An A-10 peels away from a KC-135 tanker over Afghanistan, February 2011 with Pave Penny pod visible and featuring a false canopy painted in dark gray on the underside.

In March 2011, six A-10s were deployed as part of Operation Odyssey Dawn, the coalition intervention in Libya. They participated in attacks on Libyan ground forces there.

The USAF 122nd Fighter Wing revealed it would deploy to the Middle East in October 2014 with 12 A-10s. Although the deployment had been planned a year in advance in a support role, the timing coincided with the ongoing Operation Inherent Resolve against ISIL militants. From mid-November, U.S. commanders began sending A-10s to hit IS targets in central and northwestern Iraq on an almost daily basis. Over a two-month period, A-10s flew 11 percent of all USAF sorties since the start of operations in August 2014. On 15 November 2015, two days after the ISIL attacks in Paris, A-10s and AC-130s destroyed a convoy of over 100 ISIL-operated oil tanker trucks in Syria as part of an intensification of the U.S.-led intervention against ISIL called Operation Tidal Wave II (named after Operation Tidal Wave during World War II, a failed attempt to raid German oil fields) in an attempt to stop oil smuggling as a source of funds for the group.

The A-10 was involved in the killing of 35 Afghan civilians from 2010 to 2015, more than any other U.S. military aircraft and also involved in killing ten U.S. troops in friendly fire over four incidents between 2001 and 2015. These incidents have been assessed as "inconclusive and statistically insignificant" in terms of the plane's capability.

On 19 January 2018, 12 A-10s from the 303d Expeditionary Fighter Squadron were deployed to Kandahar Airfield, Afghanistan, to provide CAS, marking the first time in more than three years A-10s had been deployed to Afghanistan.

On 29 November and 3 December 2024, USAF A-10s were used against targets in Syria to defend US forces in eastern Syria as part of the ongoing Syrian civil war. The USAF said the strikes destroyed vehicles, mortars, and a T-64 tank. Concurrent with the fall of the Assad regime on 8 December, A-10s participated alongside B-52s and F-15Es in what the USAF said were "dozens" of airstrikes against over 75 ISIS targets. The strikes were intended to prevent ISIS from benefitting from the political upheaval in Syria.

On 29 March 2025, "several" A-10s from the 124th Fighter Wing were deployed to the Middle East as part of the continued conflict with Houthi forces in Yemen.

==== Iran war (2026) ====
On 1 March 2026, U.S. Central Command stated that A-10s were employed during the first 24 hours of 2026 Iran war. Top US general Dan Caine later said that A-10s were used for "hunting and killing fast-attack watercraft" in the Hormuz Strait during the war.

On 3 April 2026, a USAF A-10 was shot down in the Persian Gulf by Iranian air defences amid a combat search and rescue mission for a downed F-15E crewman (WSO). The A-10 made it to Kuwaiti airspace where the pilot ejected and was rescued while the A-10 crashed.

=== Future ===
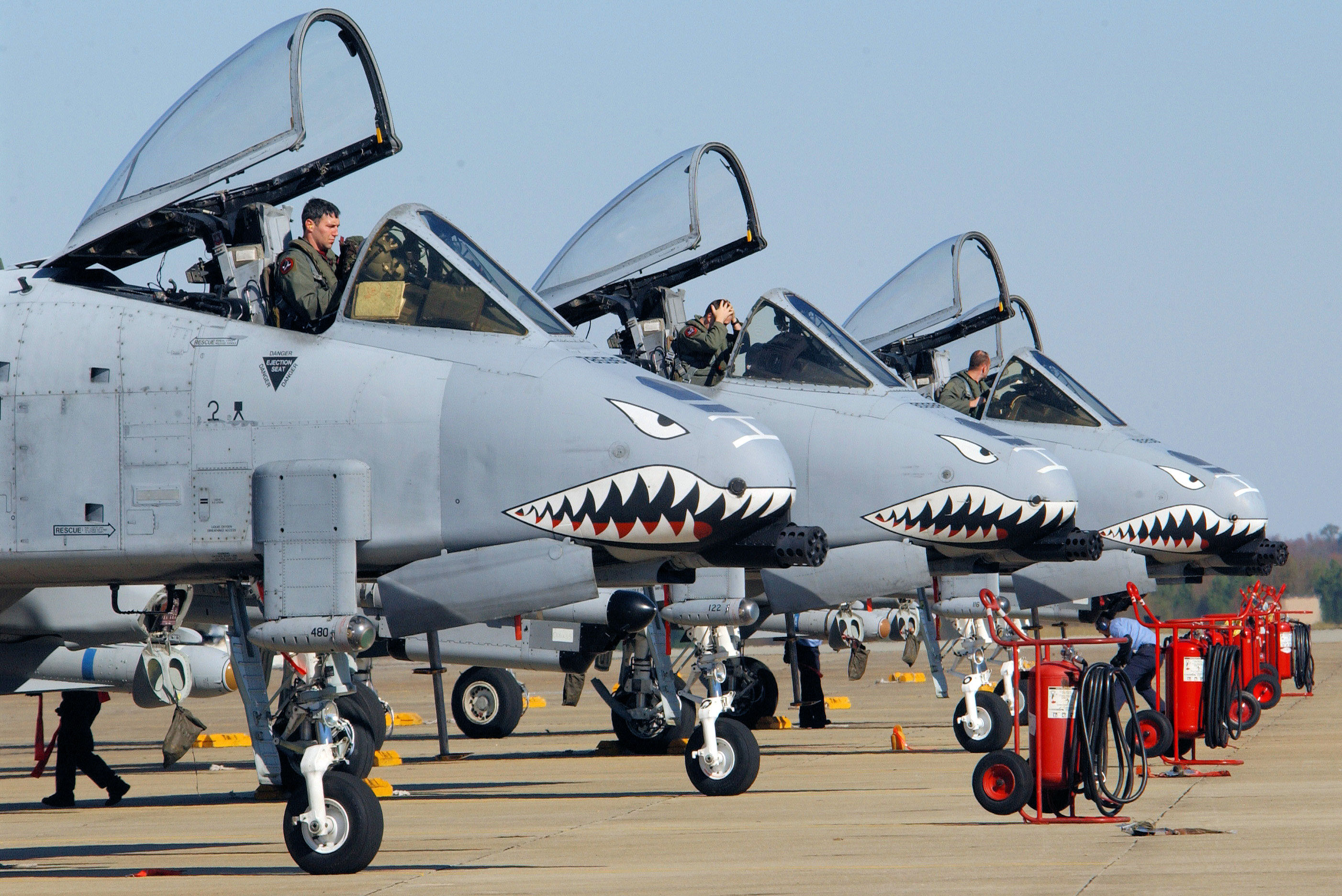
23rd Fighter Group A-10s on high alert

The A-10's future remains a subject of debate. In 2007, the USAF expected it to remain in service until 2028 and possibly later, when it would likely be replaced by the Lockheed Martin F-35 Lightning II. Director of the Straus Military Reform Project of the Project On Government Oversight Winslow Wheeler, a critic of this plan, said that replacing the A-10 with the F-35 would be a "giant leap backwards" given the A-10's performance and the F-35's high costs. In 2012, the USAF considered the F-35B STOVL variant as a replacement CAS aircraft, but concluded that it could not generate sufficient sorties. In August 2013, Congress and the USAF examined various proposals, including the F-35 and the MQ-9 Reaper unmanned aerial vehicle filling the A-10's role. Proponents state that the A-10's armor and cannon are superior to aircraft such as the F-35 for ground attack, that guided munitions could be jammed, and that ground commanders commonly request A-10 support.

In the USAF's FY 2015 budget, the service considered retiring the A-10 and other single-mission aircraft, prioritizing multi-mission aircraft; cutting a whole fleet and its infrastructure was seen as the only method for major savings. The U.S. Army had expressed interest in obtaining some A-10s were the USAF to retire them, but later stated there was "no chance" of that happening. The USAF stated that retirement would save $3.7 billion from 2015 to 2019. Guided munitions allow more aircraft to perform CAS duties and reduce the need for specialized aircraft; since 2001, multirole aircraft and bombers have performed 80 percent of operational CAS missions. The USAF also said that the A-10 was increasingly vulnerable to modern anti-aircraft weapons, but the Army replied that it had proved invaluable due to its versatile weapons loads, psychological impact, and limited logistics needs.

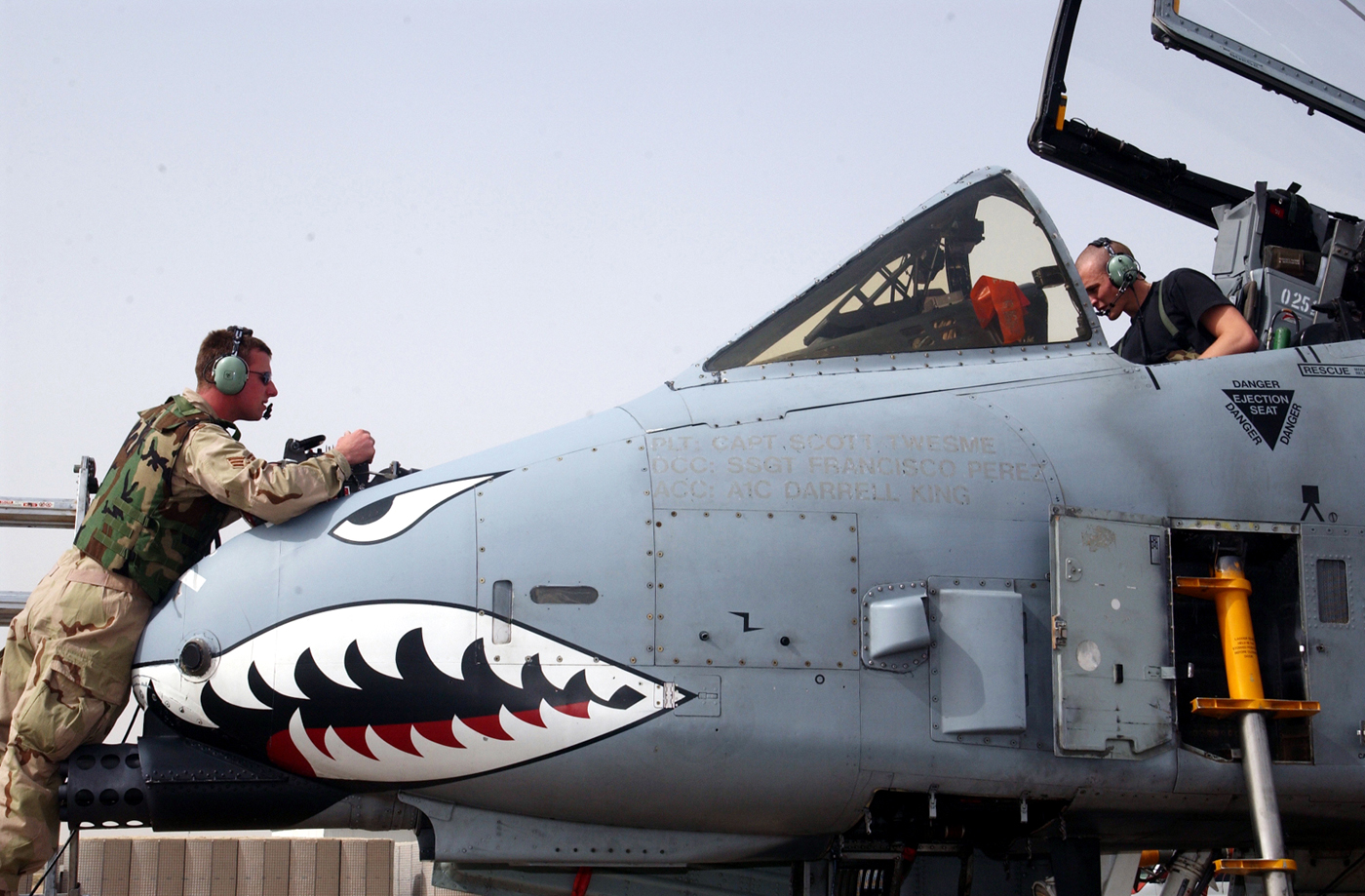
USAF crewmen perform maintenance on an A-10's nose in the Persian Gulf region in 2003.

In January 2015, USAF officials told lawmakers that it would take 15 years to fully develop a new attack aircraft to replace the A-10; that year General Herbert J. Carlisle, the head of Air Combat Command, stated that a follow-on weapon system for the A-10 may need development. It planned for F-16s and F-15Es to initially take up CAS sorties, and later by the F-35A once sufficient numbers become operationally available over the next decade. In July 2015, Boeing held initial discussions on the prospects of selling retired or stored A-10s in near-flyaway condition to international customers. However, the USAF stated that it would not permit any to be sold.

Plans to develop a replacement aircraft were announced by the US Air Combat Command in August 2015. In 2016, the USAF began studying future CAS aircraft to succeed the A-10 in low-intensity "permissive conflicts" like counterterrorism and regional stability operations, noting the F-35 to be too expensive to operate in day-to-day roles. Various platforms were considered, including low-end AT-6 Wolverine and A-29 Super Tucano turboprops and the Textron AirLand Scorpion as more basic off-the-shelf options to more sophisticated clean-sheet attack aircraft or "AT-X" derivatives of the T-X next-generation trainer as wholly new attack platforms.

In January 2016, the USAF was "indefinitely freezing" plans to retire the A-10. Beyond congressional opposition, its use in anti-ISIS operations, deployments to Eastern Europe as a response to Russia's military intervention in Ukraine, and reevaluation of F-35 numbers necessitated its retention. In February 2016, the USAF deferred the final retirement date until 2022 after F-35s replace it on a squadron-by-squadron basis. In October 2016, the USAF Materiel Command brought the depot maintenance line back to full capacity in preparation for re-winging the fleet. In June 2017, it was announced that the A-10 is retained indefinitely.

The 2022 Russian invasion of Ukraine led to some observers pushing for A-10s to be loaned to Ukraine while critics noted the diplomatic and tactical complications involved. In an interview in December 2022, Ukrainian Defense Minister Oleksii Reznikov said that in late March he asked the US Secretary of Defense Lloyd Austin for 100 surplus A-10s, noting their value against Russian tank columns. However, Austin reportedly told Minister Reznikov that the plan was "impossible", and that the "old-fashioned and slow" A-10 would be a "squeaky target" for Russian air defenses.

With Russo-Ukrainian war's rapid development of drone warfare, the A-10's effectiveness in the anti-drone screening role could potentially extend its service life.

Due to opposition from Congress, the USAF has failed to retire the A-10 for many years. However, the Air Force's plan to divest 21 A-10s gained congressional approval in the 2023 National Defense Authorization Act (NDAA). The retired A-10s at Fort Wayne will be replaced by an equal number of F-16s. The 2024 NDAA is expected to retire an additional 42 aircraft, with Air Force Chief of Staff Charles Brown expecting all A-10s to be retired by 2028 or 2029. However, Congress would pause further cuts unless the Air Force demonstrates how other aircraft can fulfill the Close Air Support missions currently undertaken by the A-10. According to Dan Grazier from Project on Government Oversight, the Air Force is ill-prepared for this transition because it requires no Close Air Support training for its F-35 pilots, despite the F-35 being advertised as the main replacement for the A-10. In April 2026 US Secretary of the Air Force Troy Meink announced that the A-10 retirement would be delayed until 2030 amid the 2026 Iran War.

=== Other uses ===
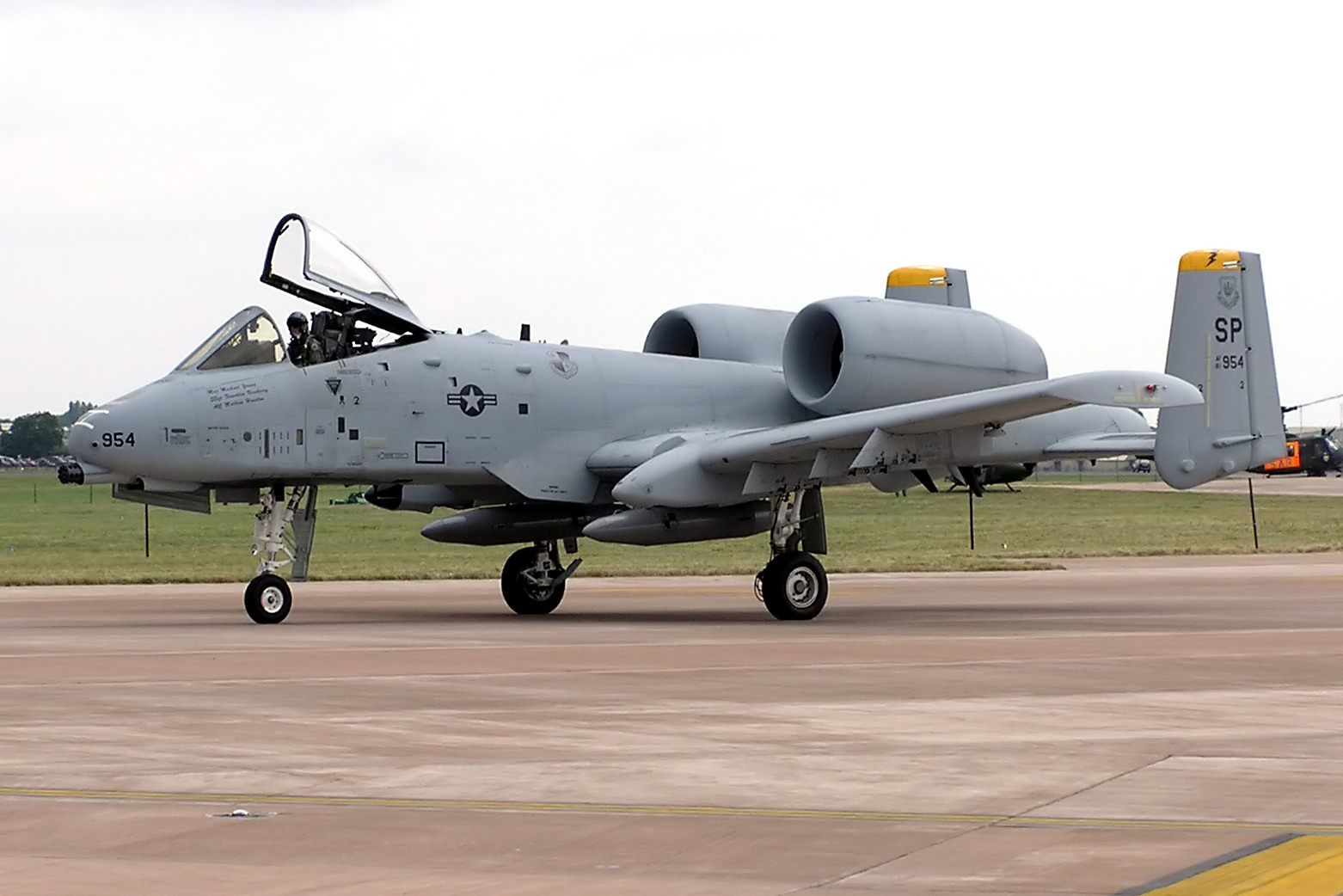
A-10 at RAF Fairford, 2005

On 25 March 2010, an A-10 conducted the first flight of an aircraft with all engines powered by a biofuel blend comprising a 1:1 blend of JP-8 and Camelina-based fuel. On 28 June 2012, the A-10 became the first aircraft to fly using a new fuel blend derived from alcohol; known as ATJ (Alcohol-to-Jet), the fuel is cellulosic-based and can be produced using wood, paper, grass, or any cellulose-based material, which are fermented into alcohols before being hydro-processed into aviation fuel. ATJ is the third alternative fuel to be evaluated by the USAF as a replacement for the petroleum-derived JP-8 fuel. Previous types were synthetic paraffinic kerosene derived from coal and natural gas and a bio-mass fuel derived from plant oils and animal fats known as Hydroprocessed Renewable Jet.

In 2011, the National Science Foundation granted $11 million to modify an A-10 for weather research for CIRPAS at the U.S. Naval Postgraduate School and in collaboration with scientists from the South Dakota School of Mines & Technology (SDSM&T), replacing SDSM&T's retired North American T-28 Trojan. In 2018, this plan was found to be too risky due to the costly modifications required, thus the program was canceled.

== Variants ==
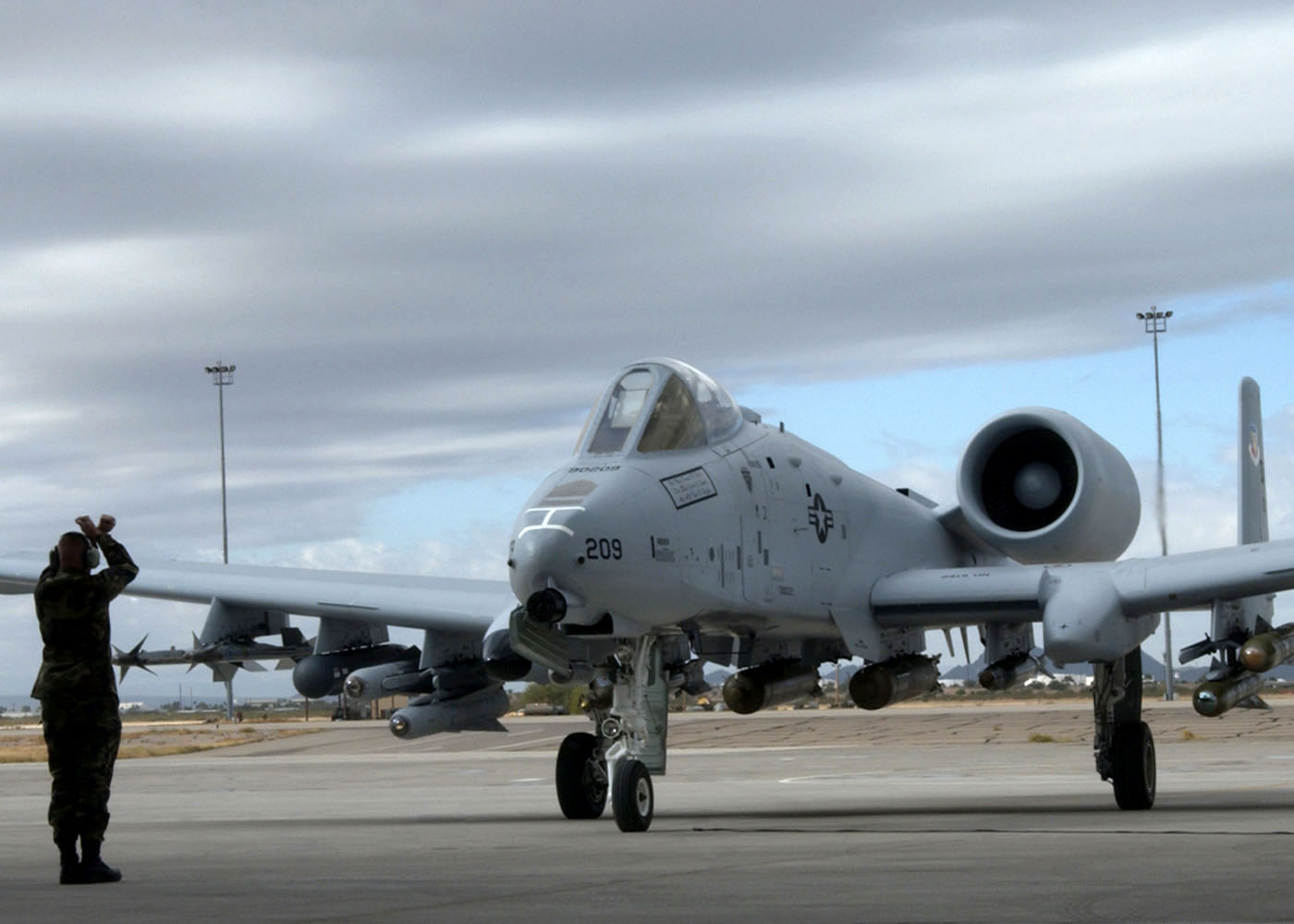
An updated A-10C arrives at Davis–Monthan AFB, 29 November 2006.

YA-10A
Pre-production variant. 12 were built.
A-10A
Single-seat close air support, ground-attack production version.
OA-10A
A-10As used for airborne forward air control.
YA-10B Night/Adverse Weather (N/AW)
Two-seat experimental prototype, for work at night and in bad weather. The one YA-10B prototype was converted from an A-10A.
A-10C
A-10As updated under the incremental Precision Engagement (PE) program.
A-10PCAS
Proposed unmanned version developed by Raytheon and Aurora Flight Sciences as part of DARPA's Persistent Close Air Support program. The PCAS program eventually dropped the idea of using an optionally manned A-10.
SPA-10
Proposed by the South Dakota School of Mines and Technology to replace its North American T-28 Trojan thunderstorm penetration aircraft. The A-10 would have its military engines, avionics, and oxygen system replaced by civilian versions. The engines and airframe would receive protection from hail, and the GAU-8 Avenger would be replaced with ballast or scientific instruments. Project canceled after partial modification of a single A-10C.

== Operators ==
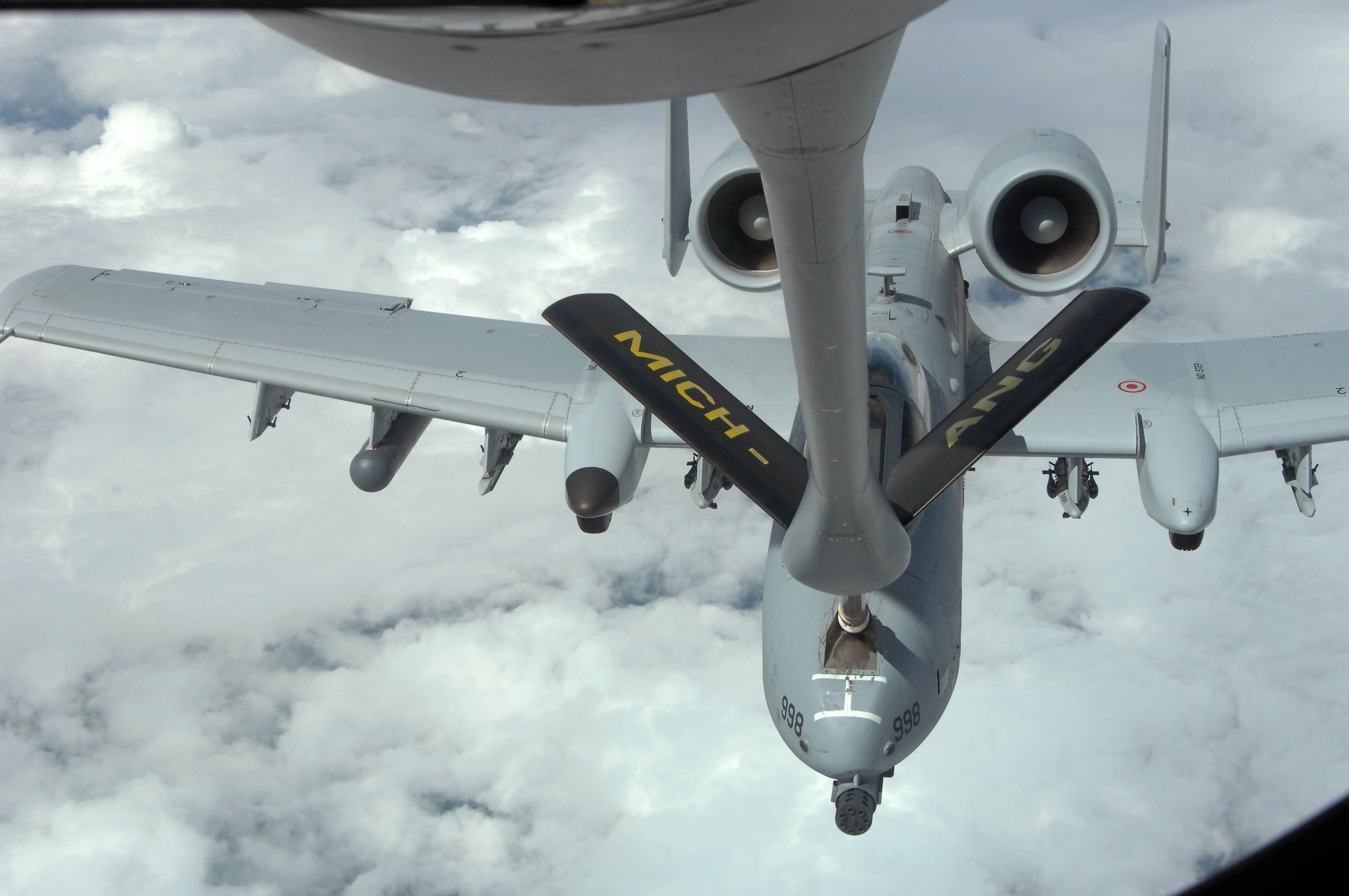
An A-10 Thunderbolt II refueling

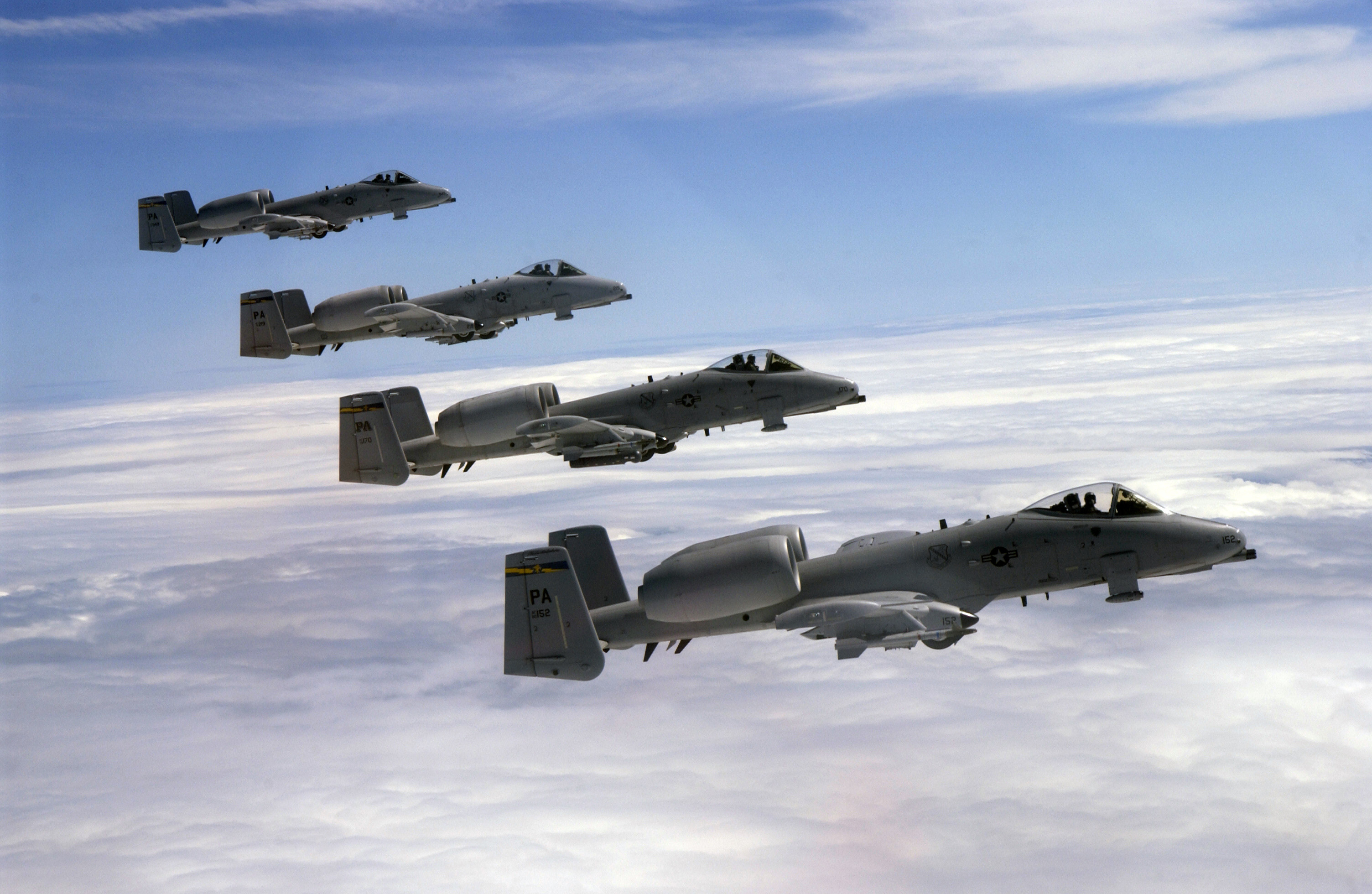
Four A-10s of the 103rd Fighter Squadron, Pennsylvania Air National Guard, fly in formation during a refueling mission.

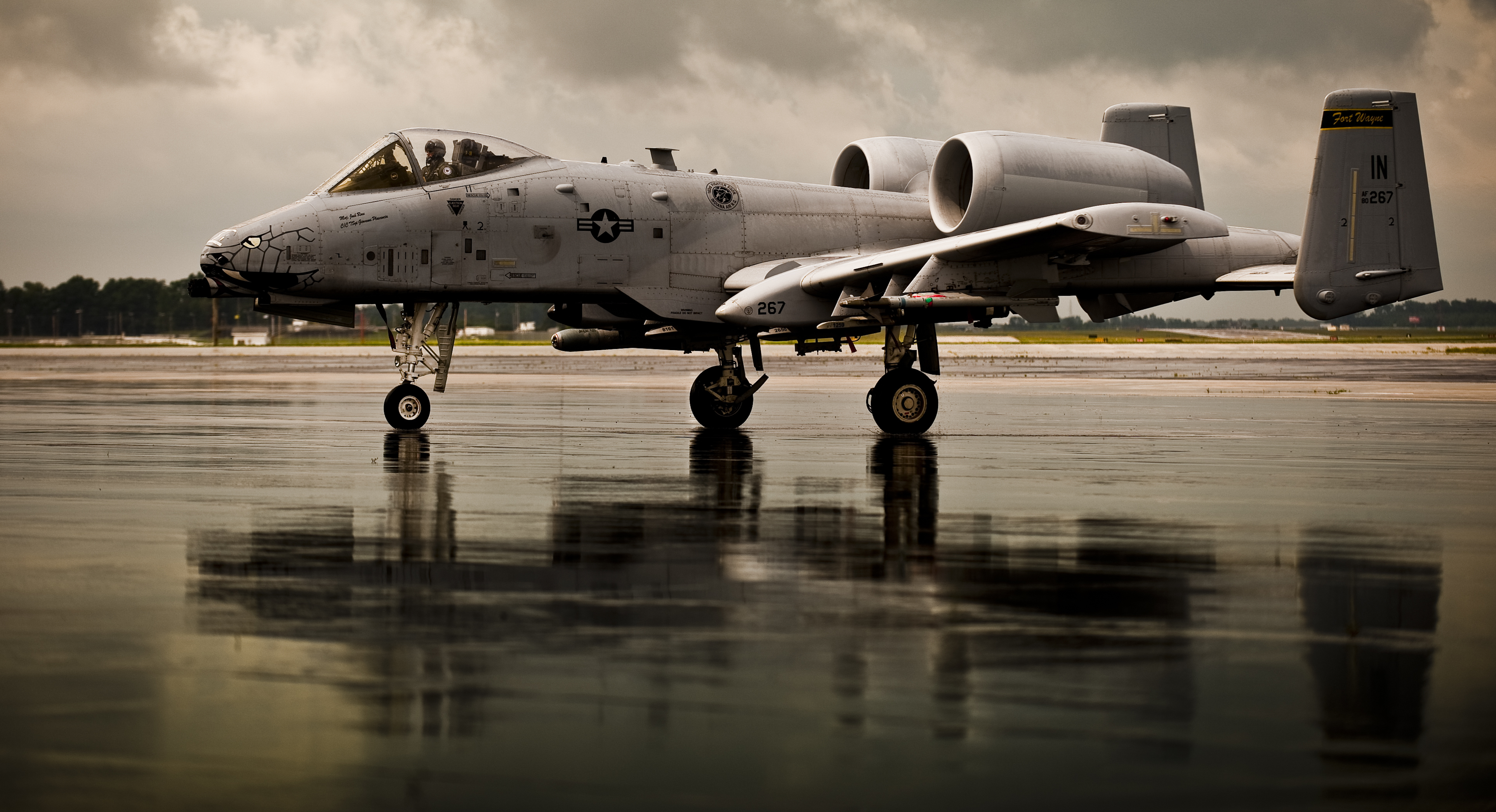
A-10C of the 163rd Fighter Squadron, Fort Wayne Air National Guard

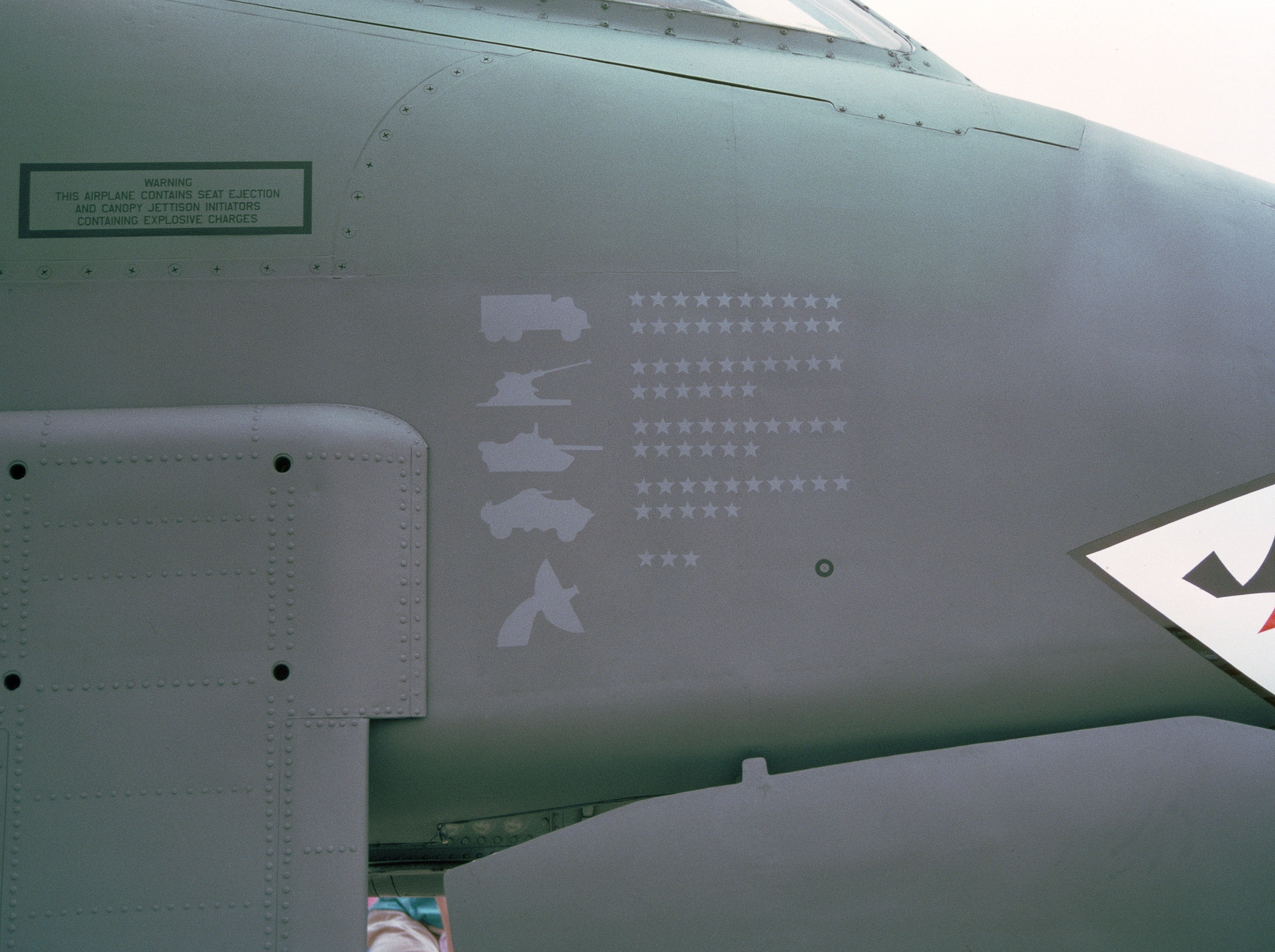
USAF A-10A showing kill markings from Operation Desert Storm, 1991

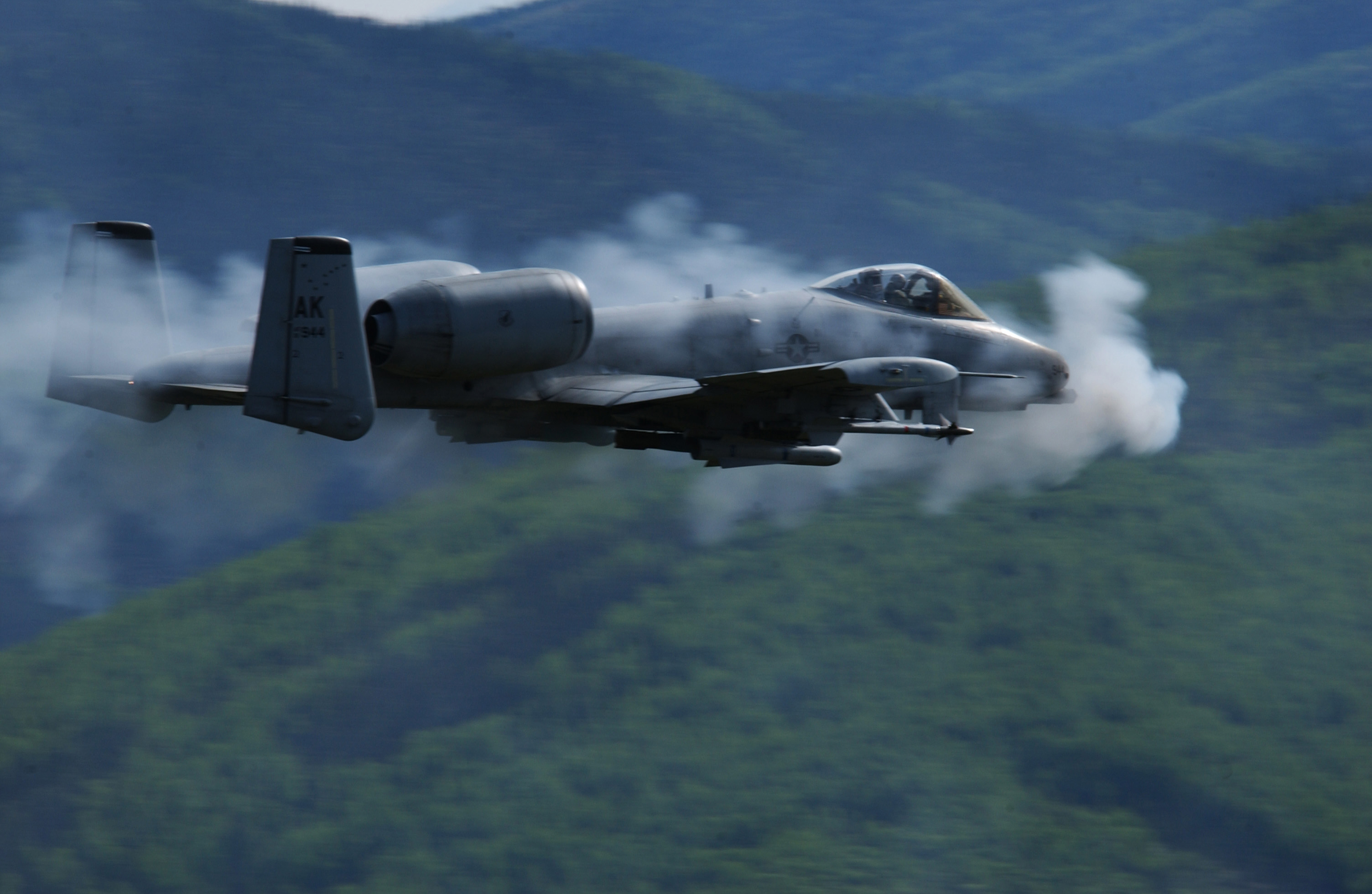
An A-10 firing its 30 mm GAU-8 Gatling gun during testing

The A-10 has been flown exclusively by the United States Air Force and its Air Reserve components, the Air Force Reserve Command (AFRC) and the Air National Guard (ANG). As of 2017, 282 A-10C aircraft are reported as operational, divided as follows: 141 USAF, 55 AFRC, 86 ANG. In 2025, there were 270 A-10Cs in service with the USAF.

United States

- United States Air Force (USAF)
  - Air Force Materiel Command (AFMC)
    - 514th Flight Test Squadron (Hill AFB, Utah) (1993–present)
  - 23rd Wing
    - 74th Fighter Squadron (Moody AFB, Georgia) (1980–1992, 1996–present)
    - 75th Fighter Squadron (Moody AFB, Georgia) (1980–1991, 1992–present)
  - 53rd Wing
    - 85th Test and Evaluation Squadron (Eglin AFB, Florida) (1977–present)
  - 124th Fighter Wing (Idaho ANG)
    - 190th Fighter Squadron (Gowen Field ANGB, Idaho) (1996–present)
  - 127th Wing (Michigan ANG)
    - 107th Fighter Squadron (Selfridge ANGB, Michigan) (2008–present)
  - 442nd Fighter Wing (AFRC)
    - 303d Fighter Squadron (Whiteman AFB, Missouri) (1982–present)
  - 476th Fighter Group (AFRC)
    - 76th Fighter Squadron (Moody AFB, Georgia) (1981–1992, 2009–present)
  - 495th Fighter Group
    - 358th Fighter Squadron (Whiteman AFB, Missouri) (1979–2014, 2015–present)

=== Former squadrons ===
- 18th Tactical Fighter Squadron (1982–1991)
- 23rd Tactical Air Support Squadron (1987–1991) (OA-10 unit)
- 25th Fighter Squadron (Osan AFB, South Korea) (1982–1989, 1993–2025)
- 40th Flight Test Squadron (Eglin AFB, Florida) (1982–2025)
- 45th Fighter Squadron (Davis-Monthan AFB, Arizona) (1981–1994, 2009–2025)
- 47th Fighter Squadron (Davis-Monthan AFB, Arizona) (1980–2025)
- 55th Tactical Fighter Squadron (1994–1996)
- 66th Weapons Squadron (Nellis AFB, Nevada) (1977–1981, 2003–2026)
- 70th Fighter Squadron (1995–2000)
- 78th Tactical Fighter Squadron (1979–1992)
- 81st Fighter Squadron (1994–2013)
- 91st Tactical Fighter Squadron (1978–1992)
- 92nd Tactical Fighter Squadron (1978–1993)
- 103rd Fighter Squadron (Pennsylvania ANG) (1988–2011) (OA-10 unit)
- 104th Fighter Squadron (Warfield ANGB, Maryland) (1979–2025)
- 118th Fighter Squadron (Connecticut ANG) (1979–2008)
- 131st Fighter Squadron (Massachusetts ANG) (1979–2007)
- 138th Fighter Squadron (New York ANG) (1979–1989)
- 163rd Fighter Squadron (Indiana ANG) (2010–2023)
- 172nd Fighter Squadron (Michigan ANG) (1991–2009)
- 176th Tactical Fighter Squadron (Wisconsin ANG) (1981–1993)
- 184th Fighter Squadron (Arkansas ANG) (2007–2014)
- 353rd Tactical Fighter Squadron (1978–1992)
- 354th Fighter Squadron (Davis-Monthan AFB, Arizona) (1979–1982, 1991–2024)
- 355th Tactical Fighter Squadron (1978–1992, 1993–2007)
- 356th Tactical Fighter Squadron (1977–1992) (Note: First unit to become operational with the A-10.)
- 357th Fighter Squadron (Davis-Monthan AFB, Arizona) (1979–2026)
- 422d Test and Evaluation Squadron (Nellis AFB, Nevada) (1977–2026)
- 509th Tactical Fighter Squadron (1979–1992)
- 510th Tactical Fighter Squadron (1979–1994)
- 511th Tactical Fighter Squadron (1980–1992)
- 706th Fighter Squadron (1982–1992, 1997–2007)

== Notable incidents ==
On 8 December 1988, an A-10A of the U.S. Air Forces in Europe crashed into a residential area in the city of Remscheid, West Germany. The aircraft crashed into the upper floor of an apartment complex. The pilot and six other people were killed. Fifty others were injured, many of them seriously. The cause of the accident was attributed to spatial disorientation, after both the mishap aircraft and its flight lead encountered difficult and adverse weather conditions for visual flying. The number of cancer cases in the vicinity of the accident rose disproportionately in the years after, raising the possibility that the aircraft may have been loaded with ammunition containing depleted uranium, contrary to U.S. statements.

On 2 April 1997, a U.S. Air Force A-10 from Davis–Monthan Air Force Base piloted by Captain Craig D. Button inexplicably flew hundreds of miles off-course without radio contact. The pilot appeared to maneuver purposefully and did not attempt to eject before the crash. His death is regarded as a suicide because no other hypothesis explains the events. The incident caused widespread public speculation about Button's intentions and whereabouts until the crash site was found three weeks later at the 12,500 ft mark on Gold Dust Peak, a remote mountain roughly 15 miles southwest of Vail, Colorado. The aircraft carried live bombs which have not been recovered.

On 28 March 2003, British Lance-Corporal of Horse Matty Hull was killed by a U.S. A-10 along with five others wounded in the 190th Fighter Squadron, Blues and Royals friendly fire incident.

== Aircraft on display ==
=== Germany ===
- 77-0264 – A-10A on static display at Spangdahlem Air Base in Bitburg, Rhineland-Palatinate

=== South Korea ===
- 76-0515 – A-10A on static display at Osan Air Base in Pyeongtaek, Gyeonggi
- 81-0979 – A-10C on static display at Camp Humphreys in Pyeongtaek, Gyeonggi

=== United Kingdom ===
- 77-0259 – A-10A on static display at the American Air Museum at the Imperial War Museum Duxford in Duxford, Cambridgeshire
- 80-0219 – A-10A on static display at the Bentwaters Cold War Museum in Rendlesham, Suffolk

=== United States ===
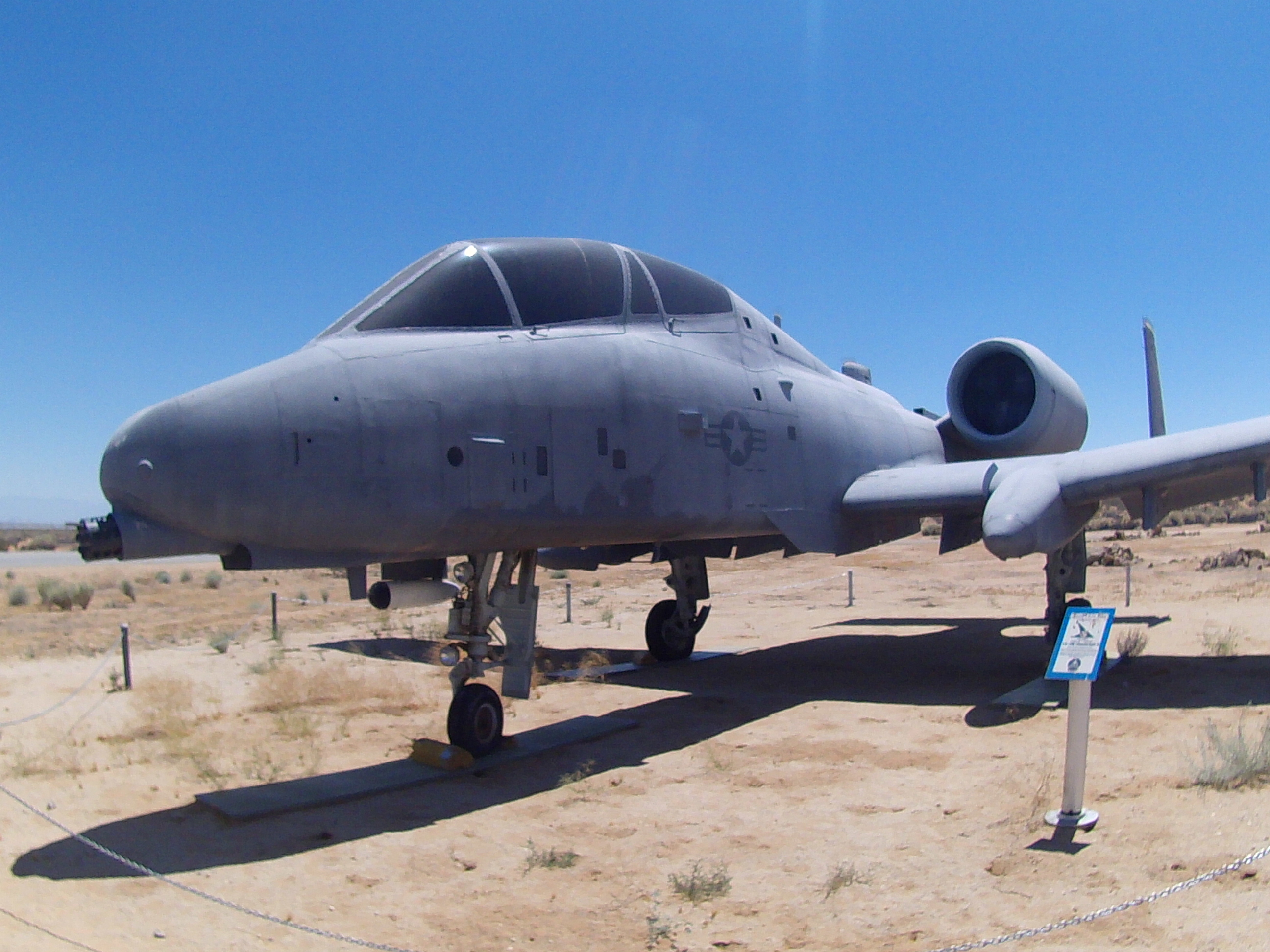
The sole YA-10B at the Air Force Flight Test Museum

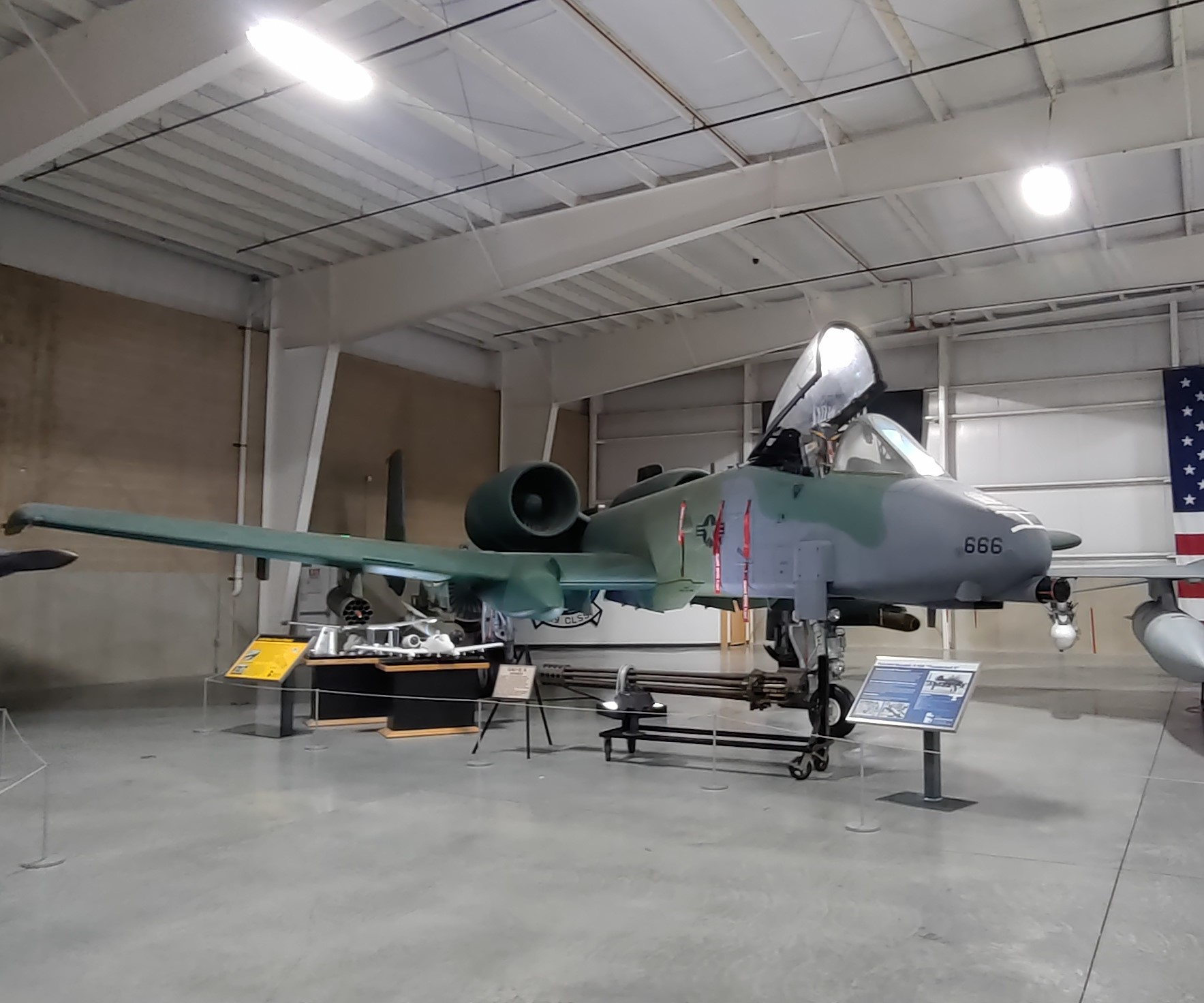
An A-10A at the Hill Aerospace Museum

- 71-1370 – YA-10A on static display at Fort Riley in Junction City, Kansas.
- 73-1664 – YA-10B in storage at the Air Force Flight Test Museum at Edwards Air Force Base near Rosamond, California.
- 73-1666 – A-10A on static display at the Hill Aerospace Museum at Hill Air Force Base in Roy, Utah.
- 73-1667 – A-10A on static display at the Flying Tiger Heritage Park in Alexandria, Louisiana.
- 75-0263 – A-10A on static display at the Empire State Aerosciences Museum in Glenville, New York.
- 75-0270 – A-10A on static display at the McChord Air Museum at McChord Air Force Base near Lakewood, Washington.
- 75-0288 – A-10A on static display at the Air Force Armament Museum at Eglin Air Force Base in Valparaiso, Florida.
- 75-0289 – A-10A on static display at Heritage Park at Eielson Air Force Base in Moose Creek, Alaska.
- 75-0293 – A-10A on static display at the Wings of Eagles Discovery Center in Elmira, New York.
- 75-0298 – A-10A on static display at the Pima Air & Space Museum in Tucson, Arizona.
- 75-0305 – A-10A on static display at the Museum of Aviation at Robins Air Force Base in Warner Robins, Georgia.
- 75-0308 – A-10A on static display at Moody Heritage Park at Moody Air Force Base in Valdosta, Georgia.
- 75-0309 – A-10A on static display at Shaw Air Force Base in Sumter, South Carolina. It is painted as 81-0964, which was credited with downing an Iraqi Mi-8 helicopter.
- 76-0516 – A-10A on static display at the Wings of Freedom Aviation Museum in Horsham, Pennsylvania.
- 76-0530 – A-10A on static display at Whiteman Air Force Base in Knob Noster, Missouri.
- 76-0535 – A-10A on static display at the Cradle of Aviation Museum in Garden City, New York.
- 76-0540 – A-10A on static display at the Aerospace Museum of California in Sacramento, California.
- 76-0547 – A-10A on static display at Lackland Air Force Base in San Antonio, Texas.
- 77-0199 – A-10A on static display at the Stafford Air & Space Museum in Weatherford, Oklahoma.
- 77-0205 – A-10A on static display at the United States Air Force Academy in Colorado Springs, Colorado.
- 77-0228 – A-10A on static display at the Grissom Air Museum in Peru, Indiana.
- 77-0244 – A-10A on static display at the Wisconsin National Guard Museum at Volk Field Air National Guard Base in Camp Douglas, Wisconsin.
- 77-0252 – A-10A nose section on static display at Cradle of Aviation Museum in Garden City, New York.
- 77‐0255 – A-10A on static display at Nellis Air Force Base in Las Vegas, Nevada.
- 77‐0262 – A-10A nose section on static display at the Pima Air & Space Museum in Tucson, Arizona.
- 78-0608 – A-10A on static display at Gowen Field Air National Guard Base in Boise, Idaho.
- 78-0627 – A-10C on static display at the Warhawk Air Museum in Nampa, Idaho.
- 78-0681 – A-10A on static display at the National Museum of the United States Air Force at Wright-Patterson Air Force Base in Dayton, Ohio.
- 78-0687 – A-10A on static display at the Don F. Pratt Memorial Museum at Fort Campbell in Clarksville, Tennessee.
- 78-0699 – A-10A on static display at the Pueblo Weisbrod Aircraft Museum in Pueblo, Colorado.
- 78-0708 – A-10A on static display at the Selfridge Military Air Museum at Selfridge Air National Guard Base near Mount Clemens, Michigan.
- 79-0087 – A-10A on static display at the Hagerstown Aviation Museum in Hagerstown, Maryland.
- 79-0097 – A-10A on static display at Warbird Park in Myrtle Beach, South Carolina.
- 79-0100 – A-10A on static display at Barnes Air National Guard Base in Westfield, Massachusetts.
- 79-0103 – A-10A on static display at Bradley Air National Guard Base in East Granby, Connecticut.
- 79-0116 – A-10A on static display at Warrior Park at Davis-Monthan Air Force Base in Tucson, Arizona.
- 79-0173 – A-10A on static display at the New England Air Museum in Windsor Locks, Connecticut.
- 79-0195 – A-10A on static display at the Russell Military Museum in Zion, Illinois.
- 80-0143 – A-10A on static display at Vance Air Force Base in Enid, Oklahoma.
- 80-0168 – A-10A on static display at Baer Field Heritage Air Park at Fort Wayne Air National Guard Base in Fort Wayne, Indiana.
- 80-0186 – OA-10A on static display at the Evergreen Aviation & Space Museum in McMinnville, Oregon.
- 80-0216 – A-10A on static display at Sheppard Air Force Base in Wichita Falls, Texas.
- 80-0247 – A-10A on static display at the American Airpower Museum in Farmingdale, New York.
- 81-0987 – A-10A on static display at Seymour Johnson Air Force Base in Goldsboro, North Carolina.

== Specifications (A-10C) ==

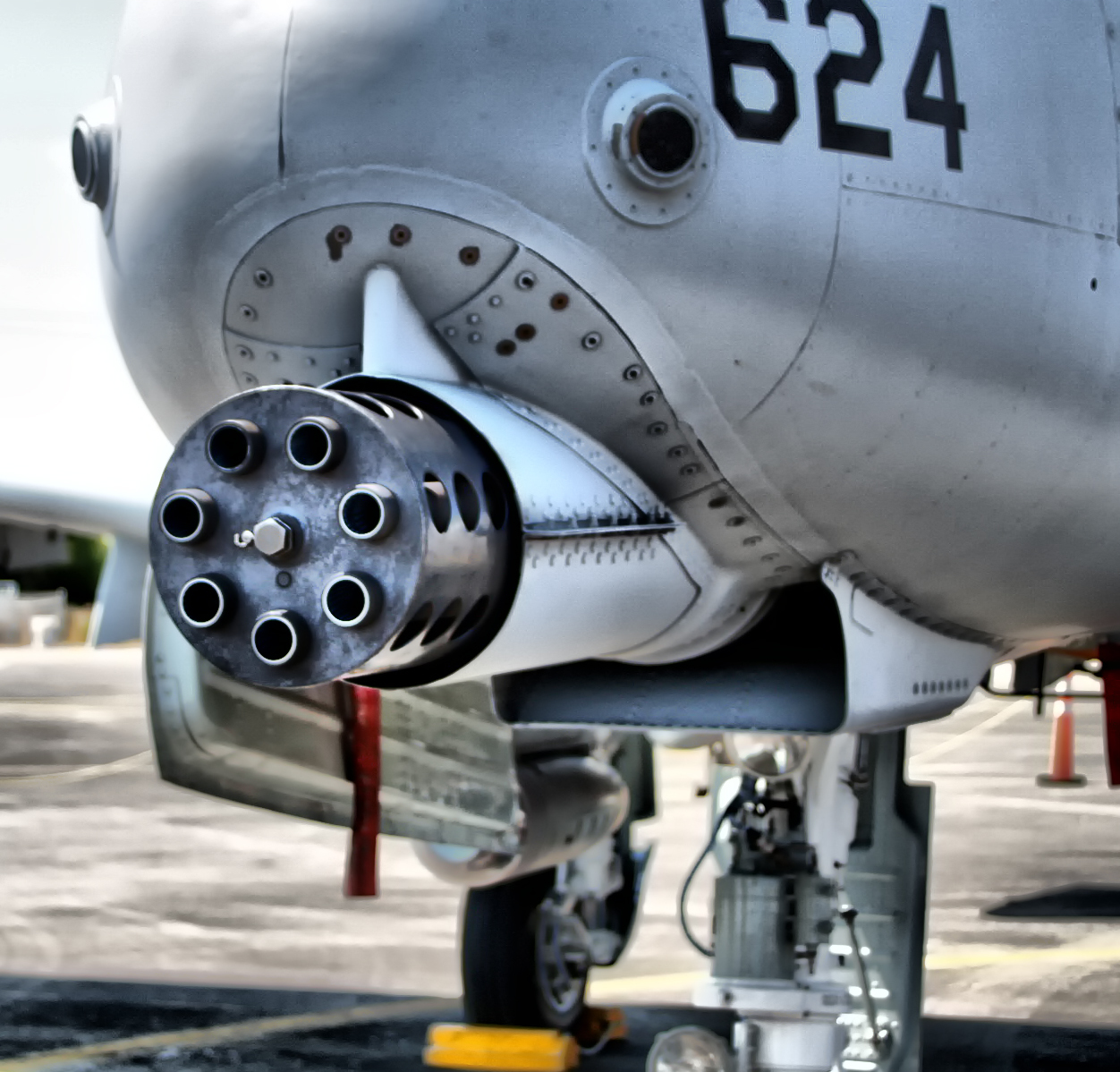
A-10's 30 mm GAU-8 Avenger cannon

Data from The Great Book of Modern Warplanes, Fairchild-Republic A/OA-10, USAF

General characteristics

- Crew: 1
- Length: 53 ft 4 in (16.26 m)
- Wingspan: 57 ft 6 in (17.53 m)
- Height: 14 ft 8 in (4.47 m)
- Wing area: 506 sq ft (47.0 m^{2})
- Airfoil: NACA 6716 root, NACA 6713 tip
- Empty weight: 24,959 lb (11,321 kg)
- Gross weight: 30,384 lb (13,782 kg)
  - Close air support (CAS) mission: 47,094 lb (21,361 kg)
  - Anti-armor mission: 42,071 lb (19,083 kg)
- Max takeoff weight: 46,000 lb (20,865 kg)
- Fuel capacity: 11,000 lb (4,990 kg) internal
- Powerplant: 2 × General Electric TF34-GE-100A turbofans, 9,065 lbf (40.32 kN) thrust each

Performance

- Maximum speed: 381 kn (439 mph, 706 km/h) at sea level, clean
- Cruise speed: 300 kn (340 mph, 560 km/h)
- Stall speed: 120 kn (138 mph, 220 km/h) at 30,000 lb (14,000 kg)
- Never exceed speed: 450 kn (518 mph, 833 km/h) at 5,000 ft (1,500 m) with 18 Mark 82 bombs
- Combat range: 250 nmi (288 mi, 463 km)
  - CAS mission: 250 nmi (290 mi; 460 km) representing a 1 hour 53 minute of loiter time at 5,000 ft (1,500 m), and 10 minutes of combat
  - Anti-armor mission: 252 nmi (290 mi; 467 km) with sea-level penetration and exit, 30 min combat
- Ferry range: 2,240 nmi (2,580 mi, 4,150 km) with 50 knots (58 mph; 26 m/s) headwinds, 20 minutes reserve
- Service ceiling: 45,000 ft (13,700 m)
- Rate of climb: 6,000 ft/min (30 m/s)
- Wing loading: 99 lb/sq ft (482 kg/m^{2})
- Thrust/weight: 0.47

Armament

- Guns: 1× 30 mm (1.18 in) GAU-8/A Avenger rotary cannon with 1,174 rounds
- Hardpoints: 11 (8× under-wing and 3× under-fuselage pylon stations) with a capacity of 16,000 lb (7,260 kg), with provisions to carry combinations of:
  - Rockets:
    - 4× LAU-61/LAU-68 rocket pods (each with 19×/7× Hydra 70 mm/APKWS rockets, respectively)
    - 6× LAU-131 rocket pods (each with 7× Hydra 70 rockets)
  - Missiles:
    - 4× AIM-9 Sidewinder air-to-air missiles for self-defense
    - 6× AGM-65 Maverick air-to-ground missiles
  - Bombs:
    - Mark 80 bomb series of unguided 'iron' bombs or
    - Mk 77 incendiary bombs or
    - BLU-1, BLU-27/B, CBU-20 Rockeye II, BL755 and CBU-52/58/71/87/89/97 cluster bombs or
    - Paveway series of Laser-guided bombs or
    - Joint Direct Attack Munition (JDAM) (A-10C) or
    - Wind Corrected Munitions Dispenser
  - Other:
    - SUU-42A/A Flares/infrared decoys and chaff dispenser pod or
    - 2× 600 US gal (2,300 L) Sargent Fletcher drop tanks for increased range/loiter time.

Avionics

- Targeting pods:
  - AN/AAQ-28(V)4 LITENING or AN/AAQ-33(V)1/2 Sniper
- Countermeasures:
  - AN/ALQ-131 or AN/ALQ-184(V)-11/12 ECM pods

== Nicknames ==
The A-10 Thunderbolt II received its popular nickname "Warthog" from the pilots and crews of the USAF attack squadrons who flew and maintained it. The A-10 is the last of Republic's jet attack aircraft to serve with the USAF. The Republic F-84 Thunderjet was nicknamed the "Hog", F-84F Thunderstreak nicknamed "Superhog", and the Republic F-105 Thunderchief tagged "Ultra Hog".

The saying Go Ugly Early has been associated with the aircraft for calling in the A-10 early to support troops in ground combat.

== See also ==
Aircraft of comparable role, configuration, and era

- Ilyushin Il-102 – (Soviet Union, Russia)
- Northrop YA-9 – (United States)
- Sukhoi Su-25 – (Soviet Union, Russia, Georgia)
- Nanchang Q-5 – (China)

Related lists

- List of attack aircraft
- List of active United States military aircraft
- List of military electronics of the United States

Other

- Textron AirLand Scorpion
