= Gook =

Ethnic slur against East and Southeast Asians

Gook (/ˈɡuːk/ or /ˈɡʊk/) is a racial slur for Vietnamese, Japanese, Chinese, Koreans, and other related ethnic groups. Its origin is unclear, but it may have originated among U.S. Marines during the Philippine–American War (1899–1902). Historically, U.S. military personnel used the word "to refer to any dark-skinned foreigner, especially a non-European or non-American." The earliest published example is dated 1920 and notes that U.S. Marines then in Haiti used the term to refer to Haitians. It was widely used by American servicemen in Asia during World War II the Korean War, and the Vietnam War.

== Etymology and history ==
The Oxford English Dictionary states that the origin of the word is unknown. The earliest use of the word in the English language comes from the name of a traditional Cornish Bonnet.

The earliest usage of gook as a slang term was recorded in a slang dictionary published in 1893, defining it as "a low prostitute".

The origin of gook as a racial slur may have originated among U.S. Marines during the Philippine–American War (1899–1913), where the similar term goo-goo was also used to refer to Filipinos. The Marines who occupied Nicaragua in 1912 took to calling the natives gooks. In 1920, it was reported that U.S. Marines in Haiti used the term to refer to Haitians. Historically, U.S. military personnel used the word to refer to non-Americans of various ethnicities.

During World War II, U.S. troops fighting on the Pacific Front occasionally referred to the occupying imperial Japanese soldiers as gooks. The term appears in the 1943 film Guadalcanal Diary, when one of the characters of the film refers to the titular setting as "gook island".

The usage for Koreans possibly comes from the Korean word "국" (guk), meaning "country", "한국" (hanguk), meaning "Korea", or "미국" (miguk), meaning "America". U.S. soldiers in the Korean War might have heard locals saying miguk (미국), referring to Americans, and misinterpreted this as "Me gook." Usage of the word was so prevalent during the first few months of the war that U.S. General Douglas MacArthur banned its use over fear that Koreans would become alienated to the United Nations Command because of the insult. In spite of MacArthur's early prohibition, the term was nonetheless used by U.S. troops during the conflict, and U.S. postwar occupation troops in South Korea continued to use the term to refer to Koreans.

The term was also used by non-American troops during the Korean War. The posthumous Victoria Cross citation for British Army major Kenneth Muir, who was killed in action at the Battle of Hill 282, stated that his last words were "The Gooks will never drive the Argylls off this hill."

In modern U.S. usage, gook refers particularly to communist soldiers during the Vietnam War and has also been used towards all Vietnamese and at other times to all Southeast Asians in general. It is considered to be highly offensive. In a highly publicized incident, Senator John McCain used the word during the 2000 presidential campaign to refer to his North Vietnamese captors when he was a prisoner of war: "I hate the gooks. I will hate them as long as I live... I was referring to my prison guards and I will continue to refer to them in language that might offend." A few days later, he apologized to the Vietnamese community at large.
