= Shoulder insignia =

Insignia worn on the shoulder of a uniform

Shoulder insignia is a piece of material affixed to the shoulders of a uniform and which may bear rank or other insignia.

== Attentes ==
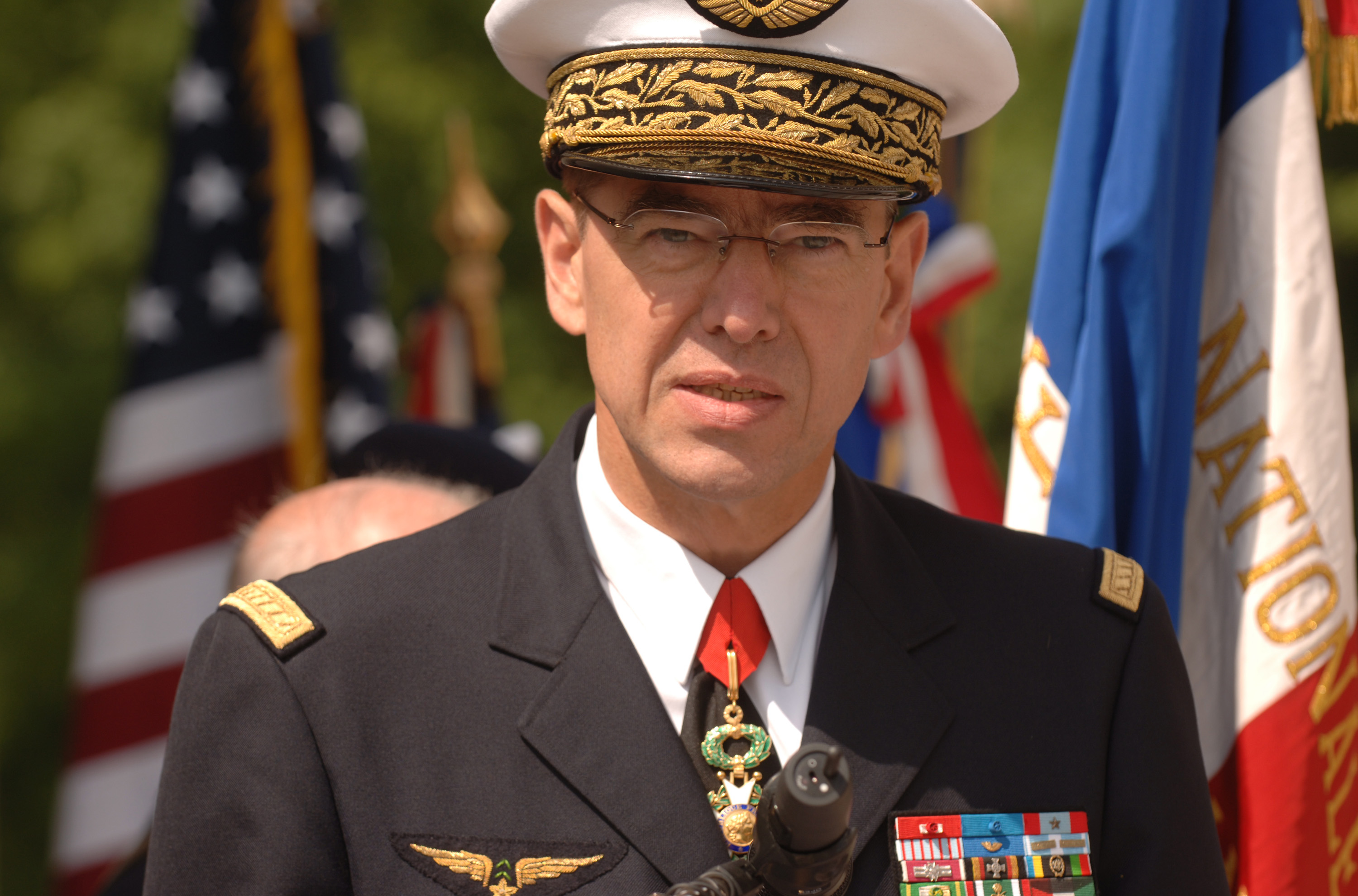
The French air force chief of staff wearing an attente on each shoulder

Attentes are small rectangular patches of gilded material worn on the ends of the shoulder. In the United States Army, these are known as 'shoulder straps' as their original purpose was to strap down epaulettes.

Attentes are worn by both commissioned and non-commissioned officers of the French Navy and the French Air and Space Force, and by general officers of the French Army on their dress uniforms. In the United States Army, they are worn by the ranks of warrant officer 1 up to general in Army Blue Service Uniform.

== Epaulettes ==
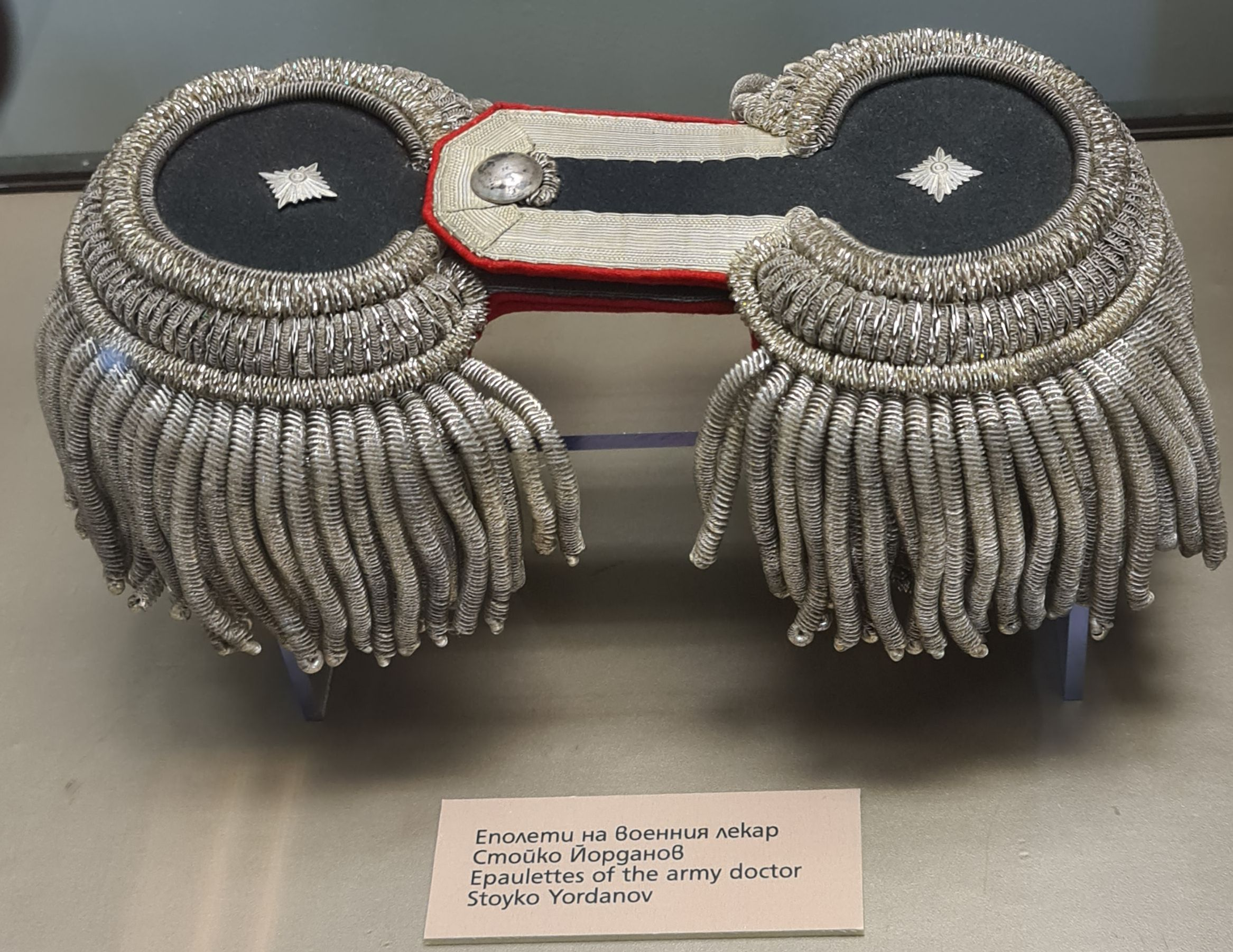
Epaulettes worn by a 19th century officer of the Bulgarian Army.

An epaulette is an ornamental shoulder piece with a fringe. Flexible metal epaulettes (usually made from brass) are referred to as shoulder scales.

Epaulettes bear some resemblance to the shoulder pteruges of ancient Greco-Roman military costumes. However, their direct origin lies in the bunches of ribbons worn on the shoulders of military coats at the end of the 17th century, which were partially decorative and partially intended to prevent shoulder belts from slipping. These ribbons were tied into a knot that left the fringed end free. This established the basic design of the epaulette as it evolved through the 18th and 19th centuries.

From the 18th century on, epaulettes were used in the French and other armies to indicate rank. The rank of an officer could be determined by whether an epaulette was worn on the left shoulder, the right shoulder, or on both. Later, a "counter-epaulette" (with no fringe) was worn on the opposite shoulder of those who wore only a single epaulette. Epaulettes were made in silver or gold for officers and in cloth of various colors for the enlisted men of various arms.

== Shoulder boards ==
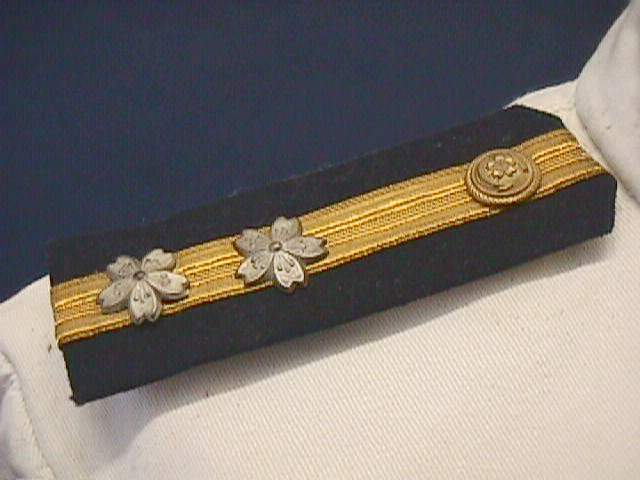
The shoulder board of a Second World War Japanese naval officer.

A shoulder board is a rigid board encased in fabric. They are most often seen on naval summer uniforms, although different services may also wear them depending on the country.

They are worn by officers of U.S. Navy on Summer White, Service Dress White, Full Dress White and Dinner Dress White uniforms, and wool overcoats and reefers. U.S. Coast Guard officers wear Naval style shoulder boards on all class B uniform shirts. Service dress uniforms in the U.S. air and land forces also have a different style of shoulder board, a firm material with an underlying longitudinal strap. The corresponding jacket shoulder has two small loops traversing from rear to front, and the open end of the shoulder board's strap is drawn through the two loops and affixed to the underside of the board. This effectively hides all the means of attachment, leaving a firm, finished surface. This particular style is what U.S. Air Force personnel call a 'shoulder board'.

Shoulder boards are worn by officers of the British Royal Navy (and in Commonwealth and other navies which base their dress on that of the Royal Navy) on tropical dress uniform, bearing the same insignia carried on the cuffs of the dress uniform.

== Shoulder cords ==
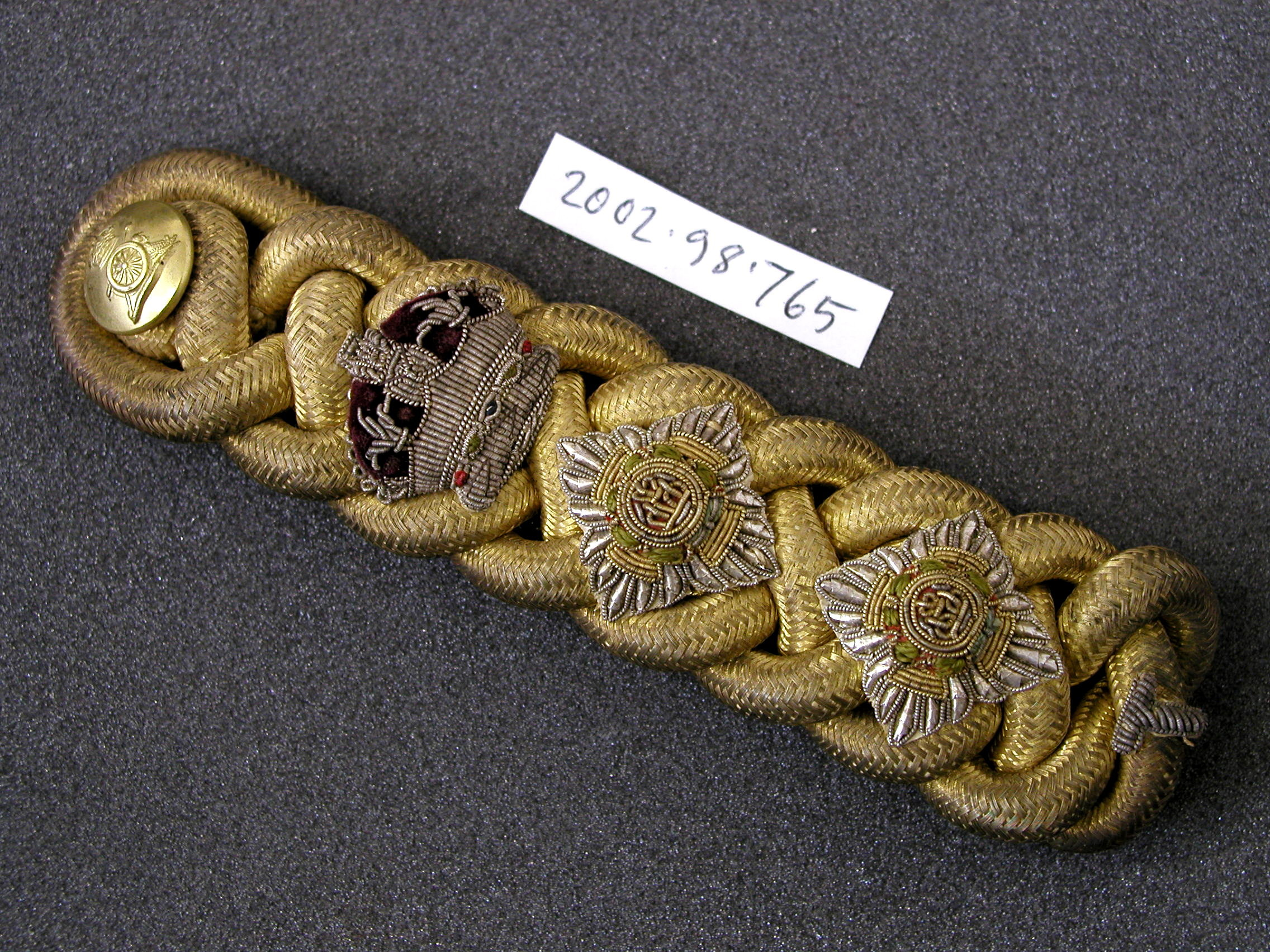
The plaited shoulder cords worn by a colonel of the British Royal Artillery.

Shoulder cords are made of a braided material. They became common on British Army officers' full dress uniform tunics in 1880 when rank insignia returned to the shoulders, having previously been worn on the collar. They are worn on officers' full dress, No. 1 dress and No. 3 dress. The most common pattern since 1880 has been triple cord simply twisted, but the Royal Artillery and the Royal Engineers wear plaited cords, as do cavalry regiments in mess dress. General officers wear larger plaited cords. Rank insignia is silver in colour in order to contrast with the gold coloured cords. Gold coloured insignia on silver coloured shoulder cords are worn by lord-lieutenants.

In the United States Army, they are known 'shoulder knots' and are worn on officers' mess dress. They should not to be confused with aiguillettes, fourragère or US Infantry Shoulder Cords.

== Shoulder straps ==
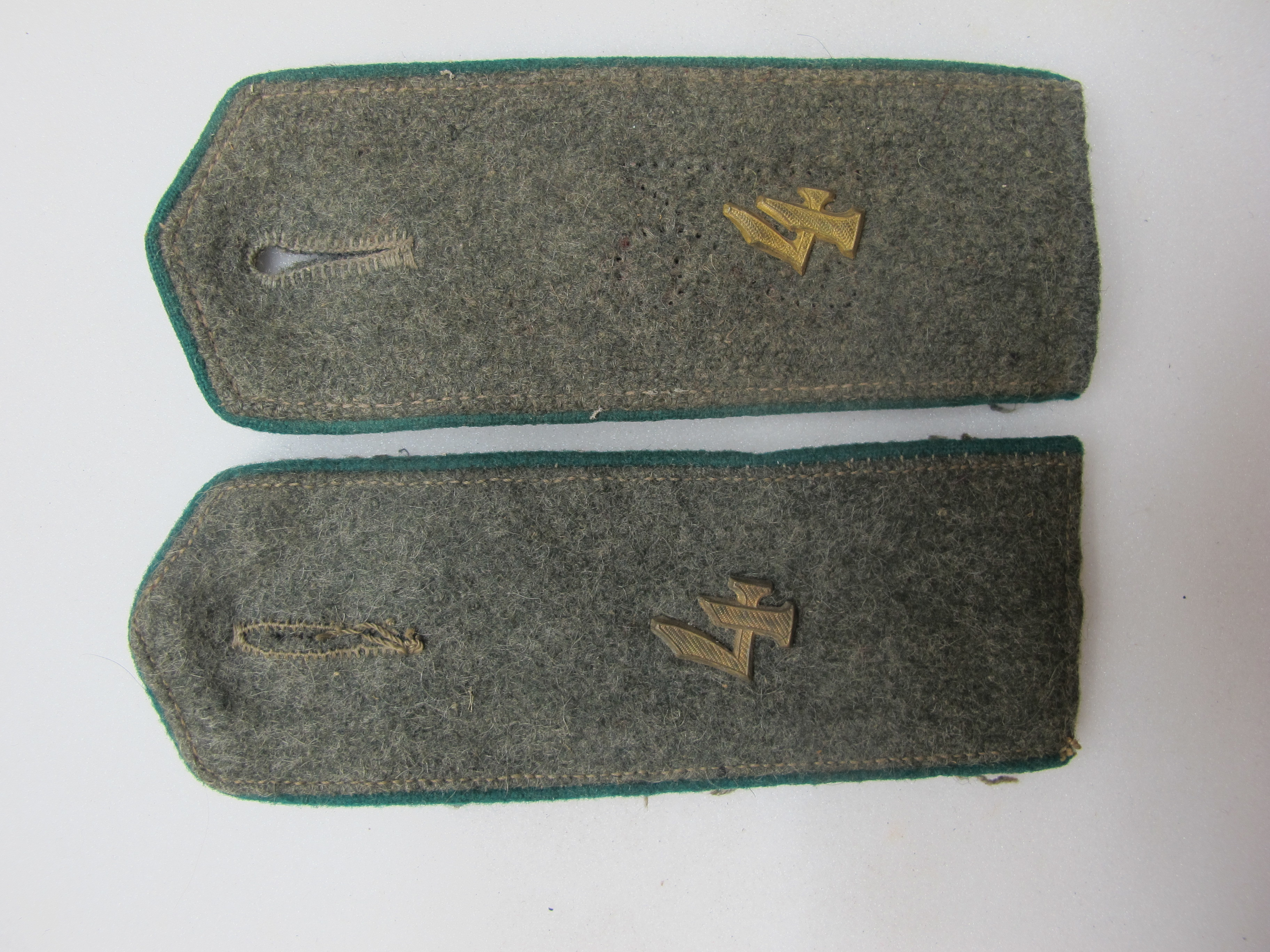
The shoulder straps of a German soldier of the First World War.

A shoulder strap is a simple and flexible cloth material extending from the end of the shoulder towards the collar where it is typically fastened by a button. In the United States Army, these are known as shoulder loops, and a shoulder strap is instead a small rectangular patch (known as 'attentes' in Europe) worn at the end of the shoulders. A rank slide, shoulder mark or slip-on (terminology varies by nation) may be worn on a shoulder strap/loop, usually on a combat uniform.

Based on the shoulder boards used by the United States Navy, the United States Army and United States Air Force developed the shoulder mark, a cloth tube with embroidered or pinned rank insignia which can be worn on a shoulder strap. The United States Space Force adopted the USAF version when the Space Force was established as a separate service in 2019. Army officer shoulder marks are colored depending on the branch with which the officer is affiliated. They have an 1/8-inch (3.2 mm) gold stripe below the embroidered grade insignia (the end far from the collar). In the Air Force and Space Force, a similar stripe is limited to senior officers (majors and above). Air Force general officers have an additional stripe at the near end. Enlisted and junior officer (also known as company grade officer) shoulder marks lack these distinctions. These are worn on all class B uniform shirts.

Some militaries, such as the Australian Defence Force and the British Armed Forces, have replaced shoulder straps on combat uniforms with a strap worn on the front of the uniform.

The Boy Scouts of America uses colored shoulder marks known as 'shoulder loops' worn on the shoulder straps to indicate the program level. Webelos Scouts wearing tan uniforms and all Cub Scout leaders wear blue loops, Boy Scouts and leaders wear forest green loops (changed from red in 2008), Varsity Scouts and leaders wear blaze (orange) loops, and Venturers and leaders wear emerald green loops. Adults who hold a district or council position wear silver loops; those with section, area, regional, or national positions wear gold loops, and those with international positions wear purple loops. The only youth permitted to wear gold loops are the National Chief, National Vice chief, and Region Chiefs of the Order of the Arrow.

== Shoulder chains ==
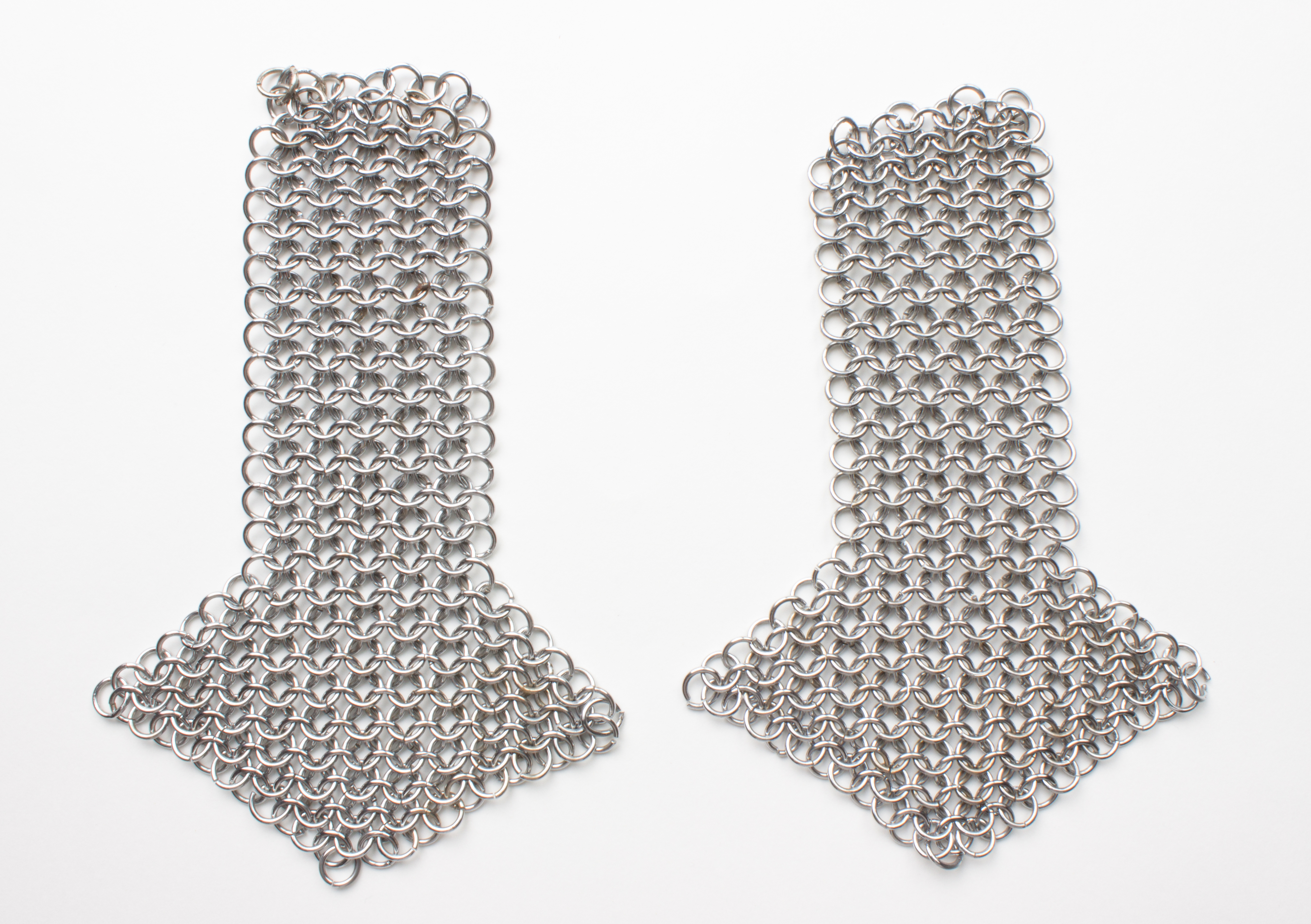
Shoulder chains worn by a member of the New Zealand Legion of Frontiersmen.

Shoulder chains are a form of chain mail fashioned over the shoulders. They were used extensively by cavalry in India to protect the shoulders from sword cuts and were adopted by all British Army cavalry units in 1887. They remain in use in No. 1 ceremonial dress by all ranks in cavalry and many yeomanry regiments of the British Army.

== See also ==
- Shoulder belt (military)
