= 190th Fighter Squadron, Blues and Royals friendly fire incident =

2003 invasion of Iraq event

Coordinates: 33°03′17″N 43°01′21″E

- Part of the 2003 invasion of Iraq
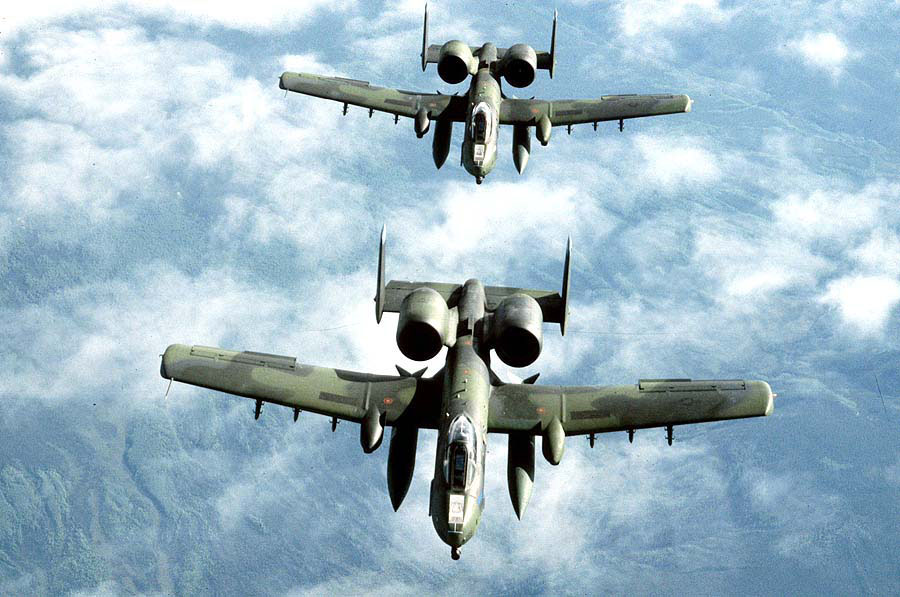
- Two A-10 Thunderbolt Attack aircraft
| Date | 28 March 2003 |
| Location | Iraq |
| Result | Two United Kingdom FV107 Scimitars destroyed, 1 British soldier killed, 5 British soldiers wounded |

The 190th Fighter Squadron, Blues and Royals friendly fire incident was a friendly fire incident involving two United States Air Force (USAF) Air National Guard 190th Fighter Squadron A-10 Thunderbolt II ground attack aircraft, and vehicles from the British D Squadron, The Blues and Royals of the Household Cavalry, and took place on 28 March 2003 during the invasion of Iraq by armed forces of the United States and United Kingdom. In the incident, the two USAF A-10s fired on and destroyed two Blues and Royals armored vehicles, killing one British soldier, and wounding five others.

Although not the only fratricide incident during the invasion, the circumstances of the inquest into the death of British lance-corporal of horse Matty Hull – and the subsequent verdict of unlawful killing – led to much media scrutiny in the UK. This was related to the release of video evidence from the attacking aircraft, and perceived levels of cooperation by government agencies of both the United States and United Kingdom with the British inquest.

== Operation Telic – 28 March 2003 ==
View from the A-10
Video of 28 March 2003 'friendly fire' incident – 40MB

Audio from the A-10s
Audio of 28 March 2003 'friendly fire' incident – 5.8MB

The Blues and Royals were serving as an armoured reconnaissance element for 16th Air Assault Brigade. Four vehicles from D Squadron, two FV107 Scimitars and two FV103 Spartans, were moving north of the main force, patrolling the Forward Edge of Battle Area. The area of the patrol had been declared as a no engagement zone to the allied forces and the vehicles were marked with the agreed coalition Combat Identification markings including orange overhead canvas panels, thermal reflectors and Union Flags.

Two A-10 Thunderbolt II aircraft of the Idaho Air National Guard, 190th Fighter Squadron (call signs POPOV35 and POPOV36) were completing a two-hour mission: engaging artillery and rocket launchers of Iraq's 6th Armoured Division, dug in 25 miles (40 km) north of Basra. The aircraft were guided to their targets by US Marine Corps forward air controllers, embedded with British ground units, and flown by a major and a lieutenant colonel on their first operational flight of the invasion. According to media reporting of the subsequent investigation, the flight was commanded by the major.

From an altitude of 12,000 ft (3,700 m), the aircraft spotted Iraqi vehicles 800 yards (730 m) north, and the British patrol less than three miles (5 km) west. Following dialogue with the Forward Air Controller (FAC) and between the aircrew, the British convoy was engaged by the A-10s in a gun and rocket attack which left the vehicles disabled. The British soldiers exited the vehicles, taking cover underneath the hulls. The aircraft conducted a second attack, resulting in the death of lance-corporal of horse (L/CoH) Matty Hull, still within his Scimitar.

Trooper Christopher Finney, 18, driver of the lead Scimitar, re-entered his burning vehicle calling a Mayday report on his still-functional radio. Trooper Finney then dragged a badly wounded L/Cpl Tudball from the burning vehicle before attempting to recover Hull in the second Scimitar, but being beaten back by exploding munitions and heat. For his actions, Trooper Finney was later awarded the George Cross, the highest award for gallantry "not in the face of the enemy."

As well as the death of Hull, a further five soldiers were injured.

== Boards of inquiry ==
The US Air Force conducted an investigation into the incident in 2003, but the results of that investigation were not publicly released, and did not result in a court-martial. Subsequent reporting of the US Air Force investigation states that the investigation found fault with both pilots' actions in the incident, including, "findings of cognitive and physical task overload, ineffective communication and failure to recognise identification panels by the two pilots." The investigation report recommended administrative or disciplinary action against both pilots. Higher United States Department of Defense officials, however, cleared both pilots of any wrongdoing.

A British Army Board of Inquiry (BoI) was held in 2004, the findings of which, among others, stated that the major authorised the lieutenant colonel to attack, but no authorisation was given by controllers on the ground. The report was released to the family of Lance Corporal Hull and later to the public. It has been alleged that certain classified material available to the BoI was withheld from the family.

== Inquest into the death of L/CoH Hull ==
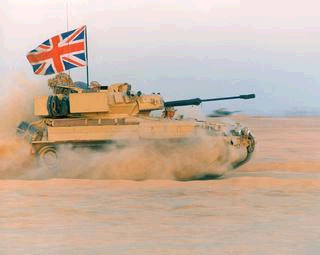
FV107 Scimitar armoured reconnaissance vehicle

At the time, the bodies of those service personnel dying overseas were repatriated to the UK via RAF Brize Norton, leading to the responsibility for inquests being under the civilian jurisdiction of the Oxfordshire coroner. An inquest into the death of L/CoH Hull was convened in 2006, presided over by Assistant Deputy Coroner Andrew Walker.

=== Discussion prior to the inquest ===
The stated position of the United States government is that US servicemen do not attend non-US courts, with written statements normally being provided.

British media reported that the UK government had pressured the US government, via the US embassy in London, to release all evidence related to the incident. A meeting between Constitutional Affairs Minister Harriet Harman and Deputy Head of Mission, David Johnson, was reported on 20 November 2006 where assurances were given that concerns of the UK government over the US policy on attendance were to be relayed to Washington.

Harman reiterated this position on 1 February 2007, highlighting the request for evidence and indicating that the US personnel could not be compelled to attend the inquest.

=== Conduct of the inquest ===
Matty Hull (1976–2003)

The inquest took oral testimony from the various British personnel associated with the incident, including those in the convoy, and a FAC who expressed the opinion that the aircrew were acting independently. Walker commented on the actions of L/Cpl Finney GC, stating: "You are a brave man. You are to be commended for what you did."

It was publicly acknowledged during the inquest that a cockpit video of the head-up display from one of the aircraft existed, which media reports indicated had been shown to the BoI, but not released to Hull's family with the findings.

The video was shown to the coroner in private, although permission to use it in public was refused by the Ministry of Defence, citing international agreements related to the release of classified information, and the US classification of the tape as secret. This adherence to international protocols led to significant criticism in the British media, leading to a public statement by Armed Forces Minister Adam Ingram which reiterated the requirement for US de-classification of the video and highlighting ongoing engagement to achieve that.

Media reporting indicated that the MOD had previously denied the existence of the video.

On 2 February 2007 Walker opted to adjourn the inquest until the video could be displayed in open court.

=== Unauthorised leak and subsequent de-classification of video evidence ===
The video was leaked to The Sun tabloid newspaper, and reported on 6 February 2007, as well as published on the newspaper's website. The newspaper indicated that the leak had come from a US military source. The US government subsequently announced that the video would be declassified, but noted that the leak was likely to be a criminal offence.

The video released was 19 minutes long, and was accompanied with recordings of cockpit audio and radio communications.

British media allege six errors on the part of the aircrew:

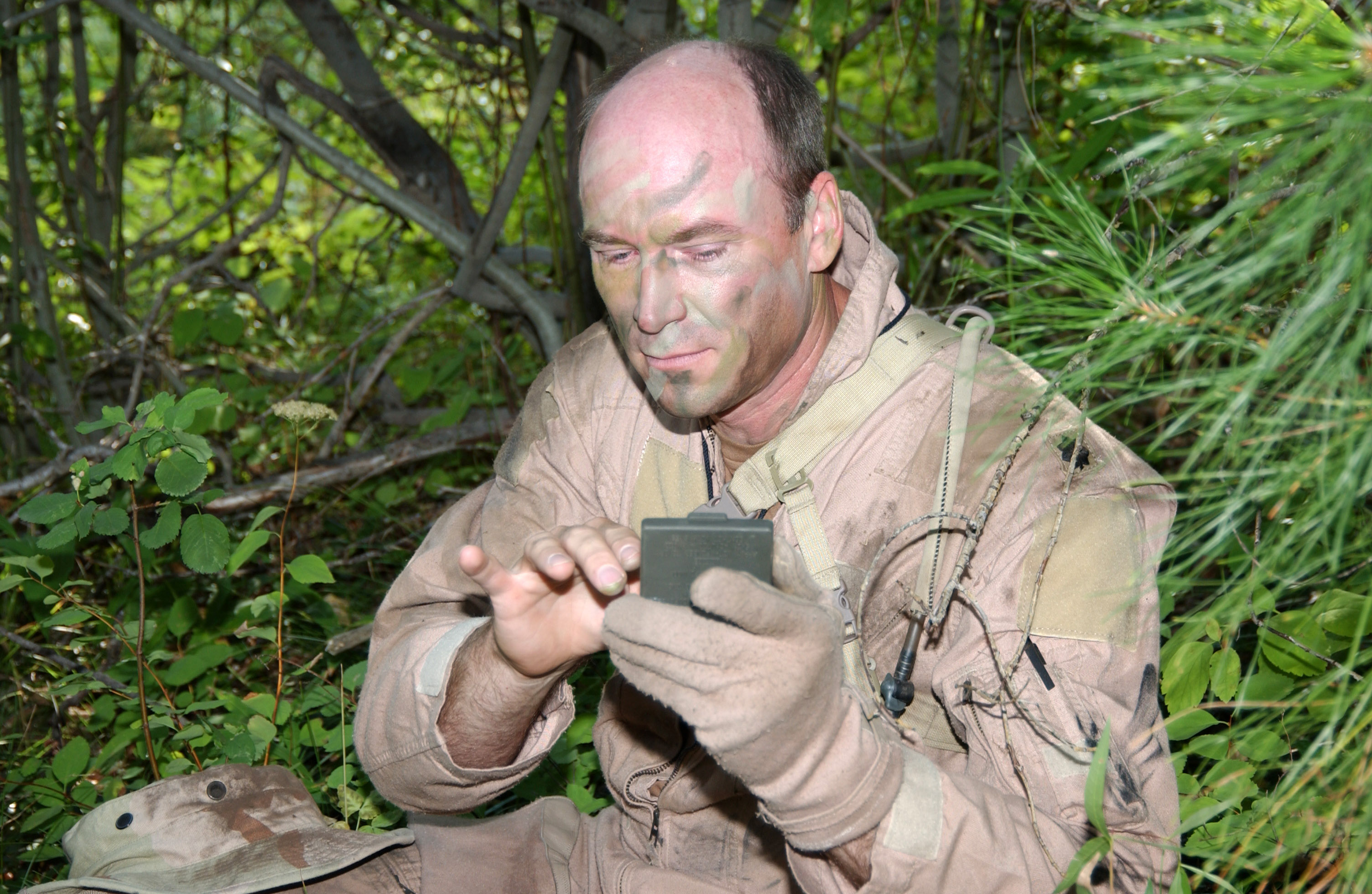
Gus Kohntopp, identified as POPOV36

1. The pilots asked the Forward Air Controller ("Manila Hotel") if friendly forces were around the Iraqi vehicles – not to the west.
2. Neither pilot gave the precise grid references for the Household Cavalry patrol to double check its identity.
3. The pilots convinced themselves that the orange identification panels were in fact orange rocket launchers.
4. POPOV36 decided to attack, saying he is "rolling in" without permission from the Forward Air Controller.
5. POPOV35 asked for artillery to fire a marker round into the target area to clear up confusion, but POPOV36 attacked without waiting for it.
6. POPOV36 strafed the column for a second time, but still doubted its identity.

The audio track includes debate over the identity of the targets and the order, from the FAC, to disengage identifying a likely "blue-on-blue" incident. The audio track also includes notification of one death and several injuries with the order to return to base. Subsequent audio indicates the pilots crying and their frustration.

A statement released by the Oxfordshire coroner's office later confirmed that Walker was of the view that, being in the public domain, the video could now be presented as evidence without the approval of the US government, and that the inquest would resume on 12 March 2007.

On 6 February 2007 the Sun named POPOV36 as Colonel Gus Kohntopp, a commercial pilot for Southwest Airlines and member of the Idaho Air National Guard. However, POPOV35, the one who gave the order: “Get him, get him,” has never been publicly identified. The British inquest was set to resume on 12 March 2007.

=== Inquest reconvened ===
The Oxfordshire inquest resumed as scheduled on 12 March with testimony from a British FAC involved in the incident, who stated that the incident would not have happened if the two U.S. pilots involved had followed the same procedures that UK pilots must follow in the same type of situation. On 13 March, the same British FAC testified that POPOV36 committed a "catalogue of serious failures" when he shot at the British vehicles in the incident, including "ignoring crucial warning signs, attacking without permission, and failing to wait for an artillery shell marker on a proposed target." After the inquest revealed that portions of relevant evidence from the U.S. investigation into the incident were blacked out in the copy of the report given to the inquest, Matty Hull's widow made a personal appeal to U.S. president George W. Bush for the information to be released to the inquest.

=== Inquest verdict ===
On 16 March, coroner Andrew Walker returned a narrative verdict, stating that the killing of Hull was "unlawful". Walker said: "The attack on the convoy amounted to an assault. It was unlawful because there was no lawful reason for it and in that respect it was criminal." Neither of the two U.S. pilots involved nor any other representative from the U.S. government appeared at the inquest, despite numerous requests from Walker, Harman, and Hull's family to do so.

=== Research focused on the incident ===
As a rare case where video of an incident of fratricide or 'friendly fire' has become publicly available, the case has attracted a great deal of interest among researchers interested in exploring the question of why such incidents occur and what might be done about them. Drawing on the sociological research traditions of ethnomethodology and conversation analysis, the work of Nevile and the work of Elsey, Mair, Smith and Watson, among these, has offered detailed accounts of how the incident unfolded in real-time as well as how it was subsequently investigated by the various military and non-military inquiries after-the-fact. In the course of their research, Elsey, Mair, Smith and Watson developed an alternative version of the transcript, based in part on the detailed information released in the USAF Friendly Fire Investigation Board Report, to make it easier to follow the incident's interactional dynamics. The transcript is available open access.

== See also ==
- List of post-1945 U.S. friendly-fire incidents with British victims
- East Knoyle War Memorial
