= Christopher Finney =

Recipient of the George Cross

Christopher Finney GC
- Born: 23 May 1984 (age 42); Brussels, Belgium
- Military career
- Allegiance: United Kingdom
- Branch: British Army
- Service years: 2000–2009
- Rank: Lance-Corporal of Horse
- Units: Blues and Royals
- Conflicts: Iraq War
- Awards: George Cross

Christopher Finney, GC (born 23 May 1984) is a former British soldier of the Blues and Royals who was awarded the George Cross for bravery under friendly fire during the 2003 invasion of Iraq.

Finney grew up in Marple, near Stockport, before moving to Dorset. He joined the British Army in September 2000. His first operational deployment came in the Iraq War. On 28 March 2003, the Scimitar armoured vehicle he was driving came under attack from a pair of American ground attack aircraft in a friendly fire incident. Finney rescued several of his comrades despite being hit by the attacking aircraft. For his valour he was awarded the George Cross: the highest award for acts of conspicuous gallantry performed when not in the face of the enemy, becoming the youngest serviceman in the British Armed Forces to receive it.

== Early life ==
Finney grew up in Marple, near Stockport, later moving to Wimborne, Dorset.

== Army career ==
Finney joined the British Army in September 2000, at the age of 15 years and 9 months. Initially he joined the Coldstream Guards before moving to the Blues and Royals after being persuaded by his section commander during his training. At the age of 16 he attended the a year-long course for junior soldiers attending the Army Foundation College in Harrogate. He joined up with the Household Cavalry Regiment at Windsor in January 2002, after completing his initial training. Finney left the UK for Iraq, along with his squadron.

=== Iraq War and George Cross ===
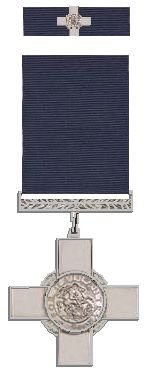
George Cross and its ribbon bar

On 28 March 2003 the Scimitar armoured vehicle Finney was driving near the Shatt al-Arab waterway north of Basra came under attack from a pair of American ground attack aircraft in a friendly fire incident. Finney escaped from the burning vehicle, but returned to it when he realised that his gunner was trapped in the turret, and succeeded in rescuing him. Realising that his comrades were all injured, Finney returned to the vehicle a second time to inform his headquarters of the situation. He then proceeded to help the wounded gunner to safety even while the two aircraft carried out a second attack, hitting Finney in the lower back and legs. Finally, he returned to the scene of the attack a third time to attempt to rescue the injured driver of another burning vehicle. The citation concludes with: "During these attacks and their horrifying aftermath, Trooper Finney displayed clearheaded courage and devotion to his comrades which was out of all proportion to his age and experience. Acting with complete disregard for his own safety even when wounded, his bravery was of the highest order throughout."

On 31 October 2003, Finney was awarded the George Cross (GC) — the highest award for acts of conspicuous gallantry performed when not in the face of the enemy, becoming the youngest serviceman in the British Armed Forces to receive it, and only the 154th direct recipient since its inception in 1940 (a number of recipients of other medals had their award converted to a GC). Lance-Corporal of Horse Mick Flynn, also of the Blues and Royals, was awarded the Conspicuous Gallantry Cross for the same action. Sergeant Andrew Sindall of the Royal Engineers, who was attached to D Squadron, was also awarded the Queen's Gallantry Medal. The award was presented to Finney at Buckingham Palace on 25 February 2004 by Queen Elizabeth II.

It had been suggested that Trooper Finney was to be nominated for the Victoria Cross, the highest military award of the British military, but the suggestion was rejected because the Victoria Cross is for acts of valour "in the face of the enemy", and as Trooper Finney and his comrades were under attack from American forces, he did not qualify for the medal.

Finney was awarded a special award at the Pride of Britain Awards in 2004 in recognition of his bravery. He also received an engraved gold watch from "the citizens of Marple" to congratulate him on his "deed of heroism". After he returned from medical leave, Finney continued to serve in the army. He was promoted to lance-corporal of horse. In January 2005, he became part of the regimental information team that travels around the country at schools and recruiting fairs.

== Post-army career ==
After leaving the army, Finney took a course in fibre optics and copper cable installation but was unable to find employment. He found work in a call centre in Poole, Dorset. After giving an interview in a national newspaper that criticised the government and the situation he now found himself in, Finney was offered a job by Joe Calzaghe Enterprises as a corporate ambassador. He was employed to promote a testimonial dinner for the charity Help for Heroes.

Finney lives with his wife, Liz, and their daughters in Cornwall where they run Goonhavern Garden Centre and Chacewater Garden Centre. In 2022 he took over as Chairman of the Victoria Cross and George Cross Association.

Finney took part in the coronation of King Charles III. As chair of the VCGCA, he had been selected as the "representative of those who serve the Crown". He was one of four persons to present the king to those gathered in Westminster Abbey as part of the first element of the service titled the Recognition.
