= List of U.S. friendly-fire incidents since 1945 with British victims =

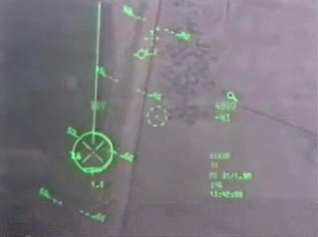
Camera footage from a U.S. A-10, as it begins an attack on a British vehicle squadron, March 2003.

This is a list of friendly fire incidents by the U.S. Military on allied British personnel and civilians.

== Korean War ==
- 23 September 1950: During the "Battle of Hill 282", three United States Air Force North American P-51 Mustang aircraft attacked a position held by the British 1st Battalion, Argyll and Sutherland Highlanders, with machine gun fire and napalm, killing 17 and wounding 76. This was a result of an improper radio contact by British ground forces with the P-51s and the pilots not being informed by several British forward air controllers of proper air recognition panels.

== Gulf War ==
- 26 February 1991: Six British soldiers of the 3rd Battalion, Royal Regiment of Fusiliers, and ten members of the attached Company of Queen's Own Highlanders were killed and further three injured after their Warrior armoured vehicles were hit by Maverick missiles fired by two U.S. Fairchild Republic A-10 Thunderbolt II ground attack aircraft. An inquest held in Oxford returned a verdict of unlawful killings.
- 27 February 1991: Two British soldiers of the Queen's Royal Irish Hussars were injured when their Scorpion armoured reconnaissance vehicles were fired on and hit by U.S. M1 Abrams tanks.

== Iraqi no-fly zones ==
- 14 April 1994: Two British officers were among the 26 Coalition personnel killed in the 1994 Black Hawk shootdown incident caused by two USAF McDonnell Douglas F-15 Eagle aircraft.

== Iraq War ==
- 23 March 2003: A Royal Air Force Panavia Tornado aircraft was shot down by a U.S. Patriot missile which identified the aircraft as an anti-radiation missile, killing two crewmen. Investigations showed that the identification friend or foe system indicator had malfunctioned and hence it was not identified as a friendly aircraft.
- 28 March 2003: British Lance-Corporal of Horse Matty Hull was killed and five others wounded when their vehicles were attacked by two U.S. A-10 Thunderbolt II ground attack aircraft in the 190th Fighter Squadron, Blues and Royals friendly fire incident.
- 6 April 2003: During the Battle of Debecka Pass, BBC World Affairs Editor John Simpson and members of his crew were injured when a bomb dropped from a U.S. F-15 Eagle aircraft hit a friendly Kurdish and U.S. Special Forces convoy, killing 15 people, including BBC translator Kamaran Abdurazaq Muhamed.

== War in Afghanistan ==
- 5 December 2006: Royal Marine Jonathan Wigley died by gunfire from a U.S. McDonnell Douglas F/A-18 Hornet aircraft.
- 23 August 2007: A bomb dropped by an F-15 Eagle killed three soldiers of the Royal Anglian Regiment and wounded a further two. During the subsequent inquest, issues such as inadequate communication equipment and incorrect coordinates from a British forward air controller were raised. The coroner finally stated it was due to the "flawed application of procedures" rather than individual errors or "recklessness".
- 21 December 2009: A British soldier was fatally shot by a US Boeing AH-64 Apache helicopter crew in Afghanistan who thought they were attacking an enemy base. Gunfire from the helicopters left 11 injured on the ground.
