= Aiguillette =

Ornamental braided cord worn on uniforms

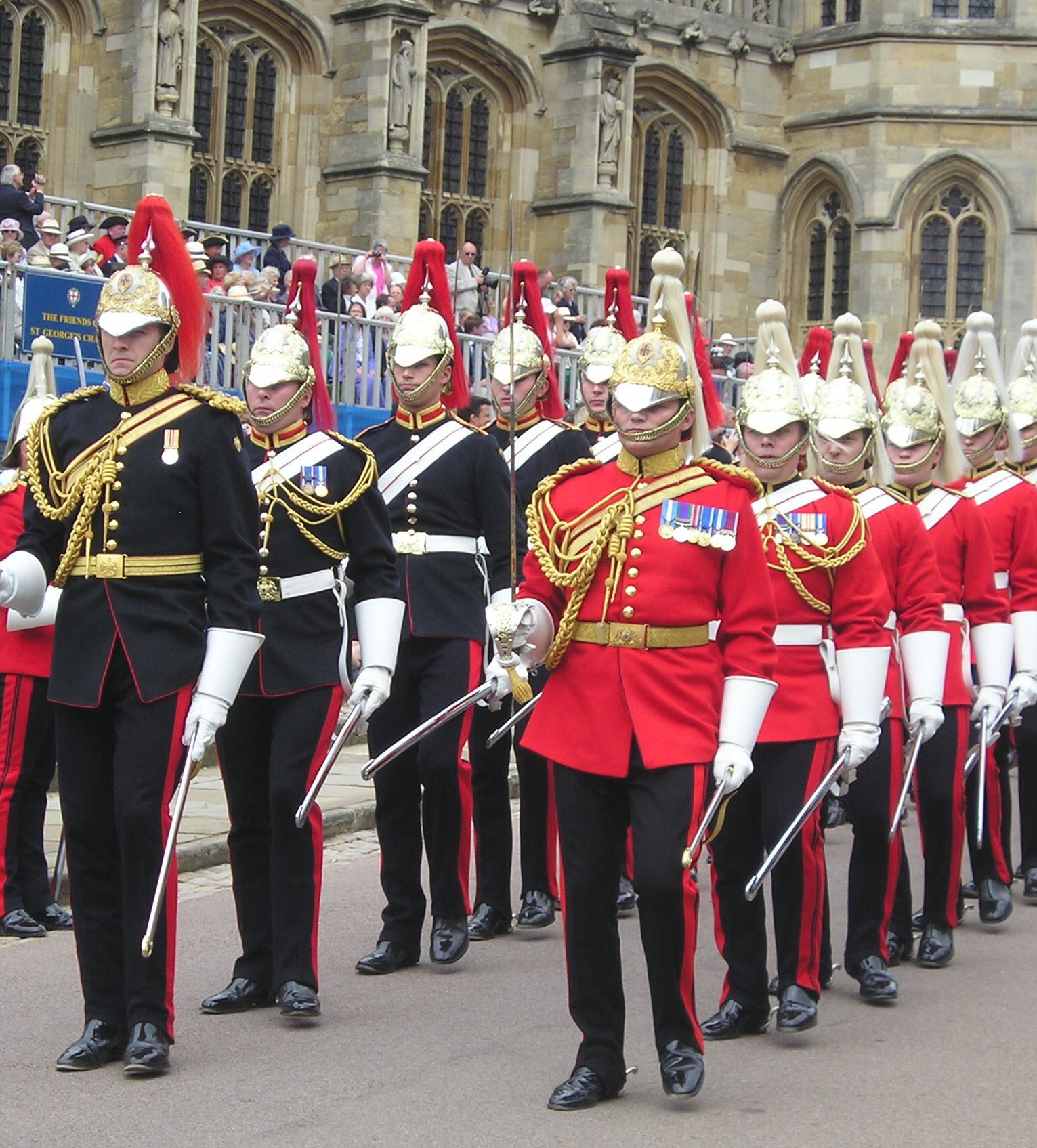
Commissioned officers (front row) and non-commissioned officers (second row) of the Household Cavalry in full dress wearing aiguillettes

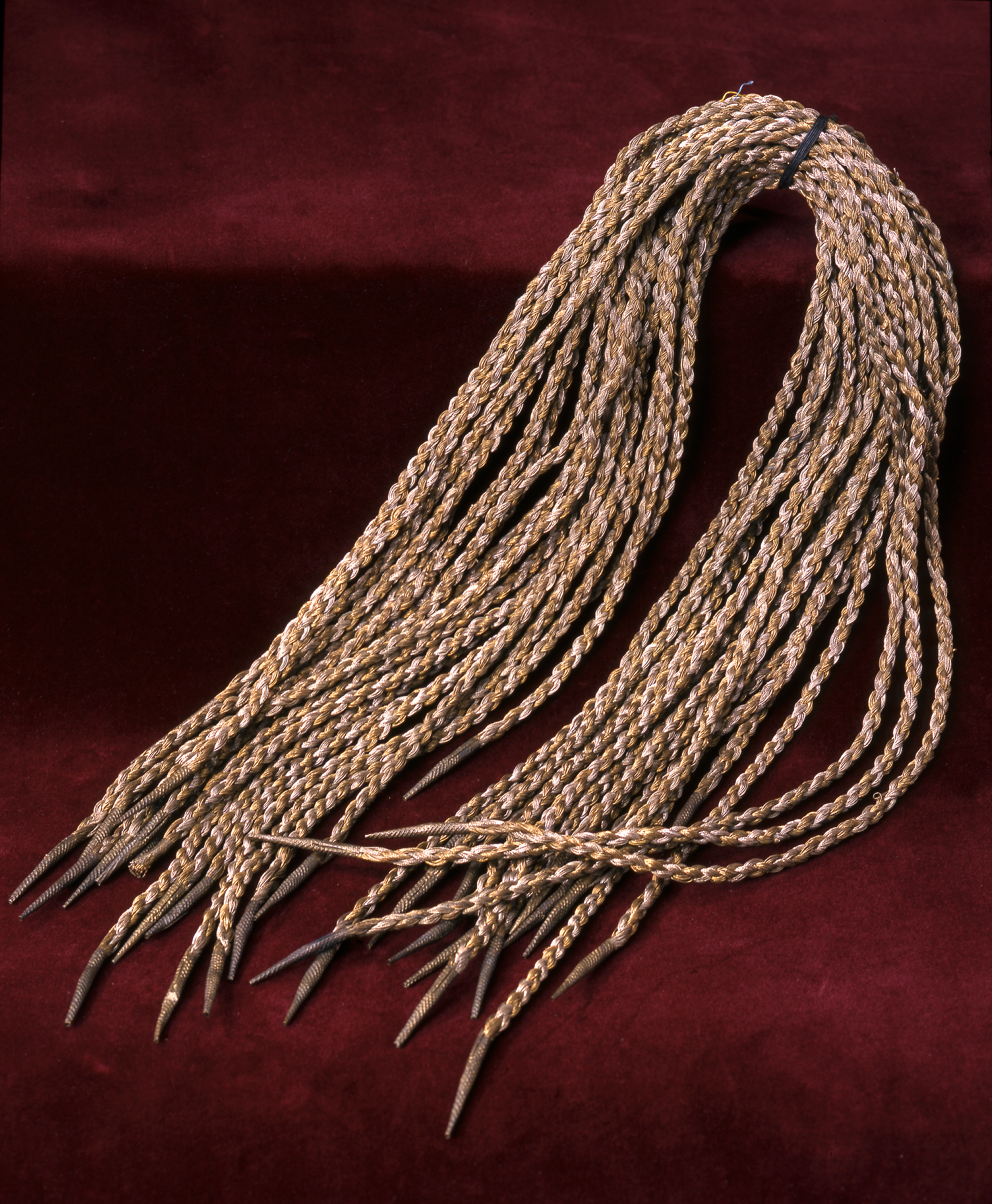
Bundle of 20 braided gold and silver laces with stamped brass tags or aiglets, first half of the 17th century

An aiguillette (French: [ɛɡɥijɛt], from aiguille, "needle"), also spelled aguillette, aiglet or aglet, is a cord with metal tips or lace tags, or the decorative tip itself.

Functional or purely decorative fasteners of silk cord with metal tips were popular in the 16th and early 17th centuries, sometimes of gold set with gemstones or enameled, are generally called "aiglets", "aglets" or "points".

In modern usage, an "aiguillette" or "axelbant" is an ornamental braided cord with decorative metal tips worn on uniforms or as part of other costumes such as academic dress, where it will denote an honour. This usage of "aiguillette" derives from lacing used to fasten plate armor together. As such, a knot or loop arrangement was used which sometimes hung from the shoulder.

These aiguillettes should not be confused with lanyards, which are cords also worn from the shoulder (or around the neck), but do not have the pointed aiguillette tips and are usually of fibre rather than gold or silver wire, and often not braided.

The modern aglet or shoelace tip and the decorative tips on bolo ties are types of aiguillettes.

== History ==
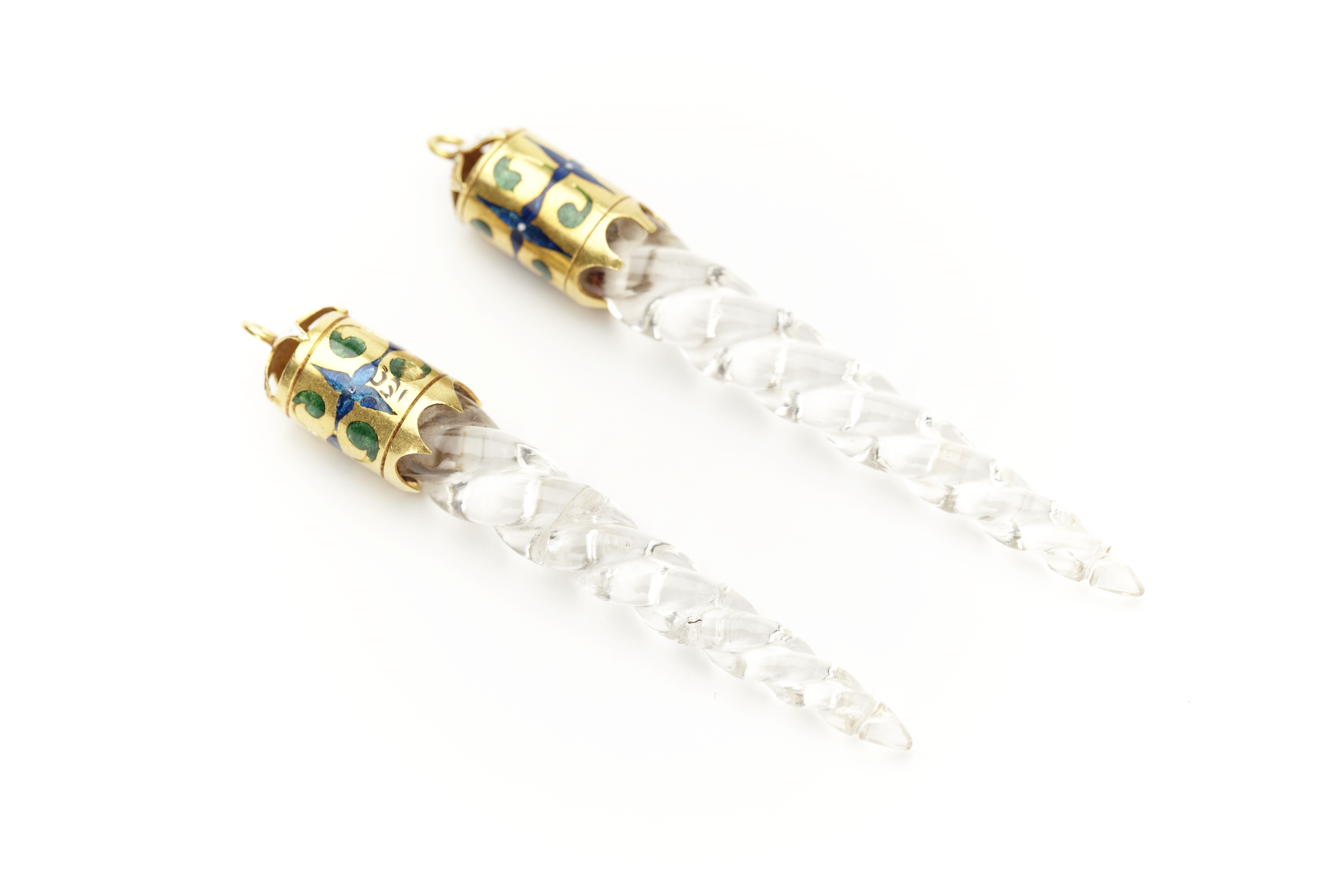
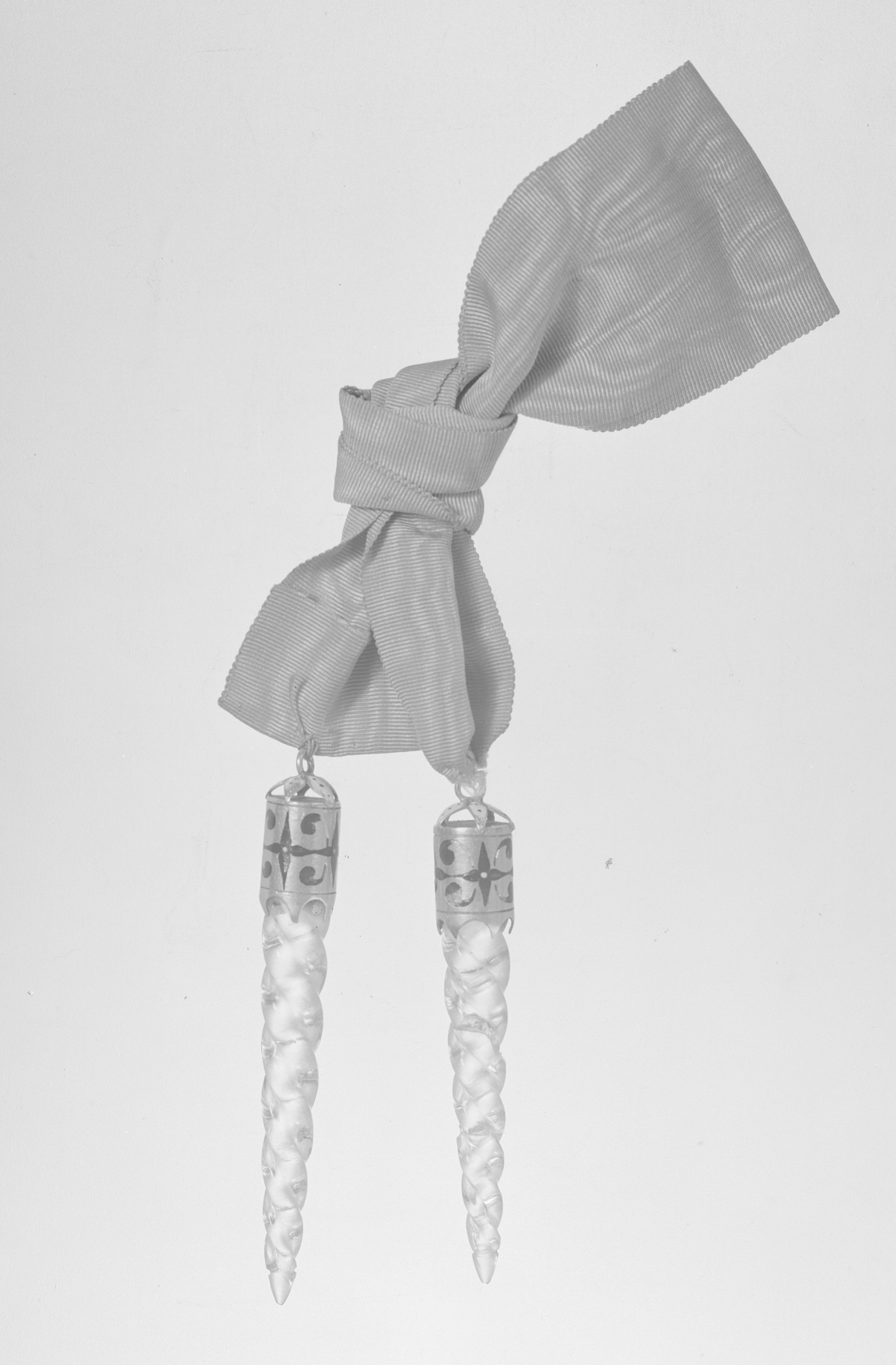
Pair of crystal, gold, and enamel aiglets, late 16th or early 17th century

The modern aiguillette derives from the laces used to secure plates of armor together. The breast- and back-plates would be attached on one side with short loops of cord acting as a hinge, and on the other by a longer and more ornate tied one, to support the arm defences.

Another tradition traces a symbolic use of a Aiguillettes to Spain, after the Duke of Alba condemned deserting Flemish to face the rope. The Flemish decided to wear a cord and a nail on their collar as a symbol of their defiance. The cord and the nail came to be seen as an emblem of their bravery and ultimately became the honour known as aiguillettes.

Portraits of the 16th and 17th centuries show that aiglets or metal tips could be functional or purely decorative, though many were used to "close" seams and slashes that are not always apparent on dark garments in portraits. They were made in matched sets, might be of silver, silver-gilt, or gold, and were worn in masses.

A 1547 inventory of Henry VIII of England's wardrobe includes one coat with 12 pairs of aiglets, and 11 gowns with a total of 367 pairs. The Day Book of the Wardrobe of Robes of Elizabeth I records items received into storage, including details of buttons and aiglets lost from the Queen's clothing. This entry suggests the huge numbers of matching aiglets fashionable forty years later:

Lost the 2 of February ... [1582] 1 bunsh of small gold tagges or aglettes from a gowne of black satten at Sittingbourne parcell [part] of uppon the same gowne 193 bunshes

Elizabeth's aiglets were variously enameled with white, red, black, blue, and purple details or set with diamonds, garnets, rubies and pearls. In Scotland, they were known as "horns", Mary, Queen of Scots had pairs of gold horns enamelled in red and white and set with pearls. Those of Anne of Denmark in the early years of the 17th century were larger, shaped in triangles and pyramids. One set of 24 were made three-sided, with "27 diamonds in the sides and one in the top", for a total of 642 diamonds in the set.

=== Gallery ===
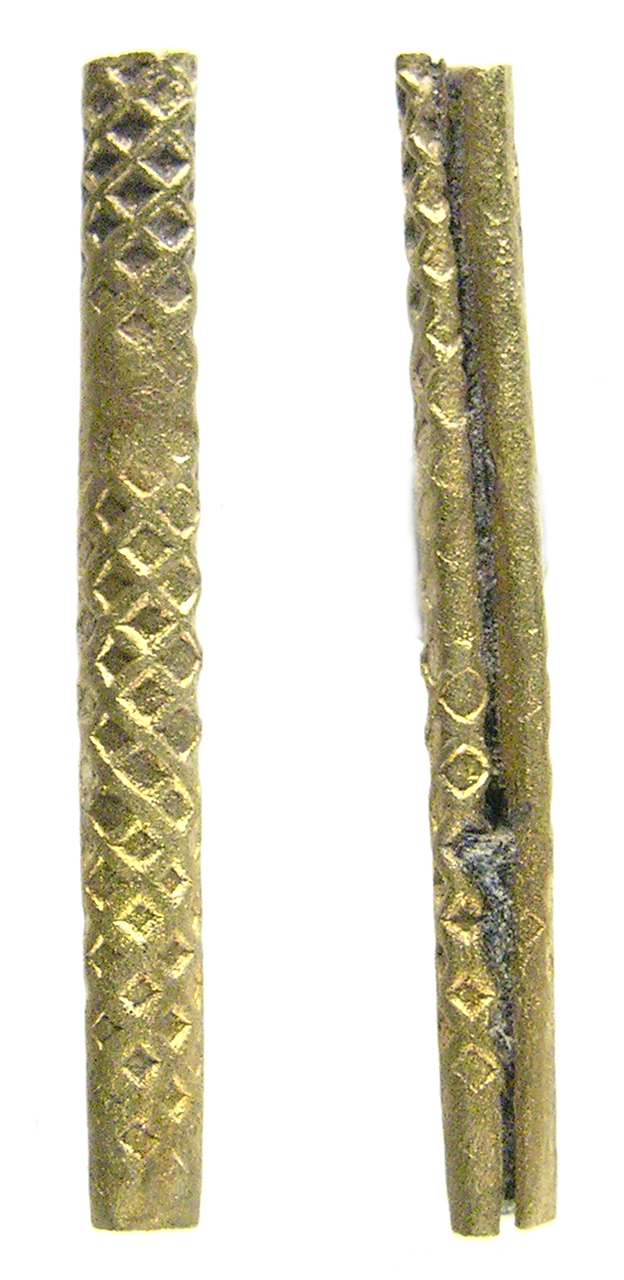
Surviving 16th or 17th-century copper-alloy lace tag found in London.

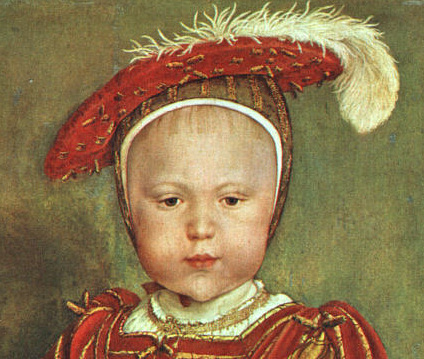
Hat and gown trimmed with pairs of aiglets, 1538

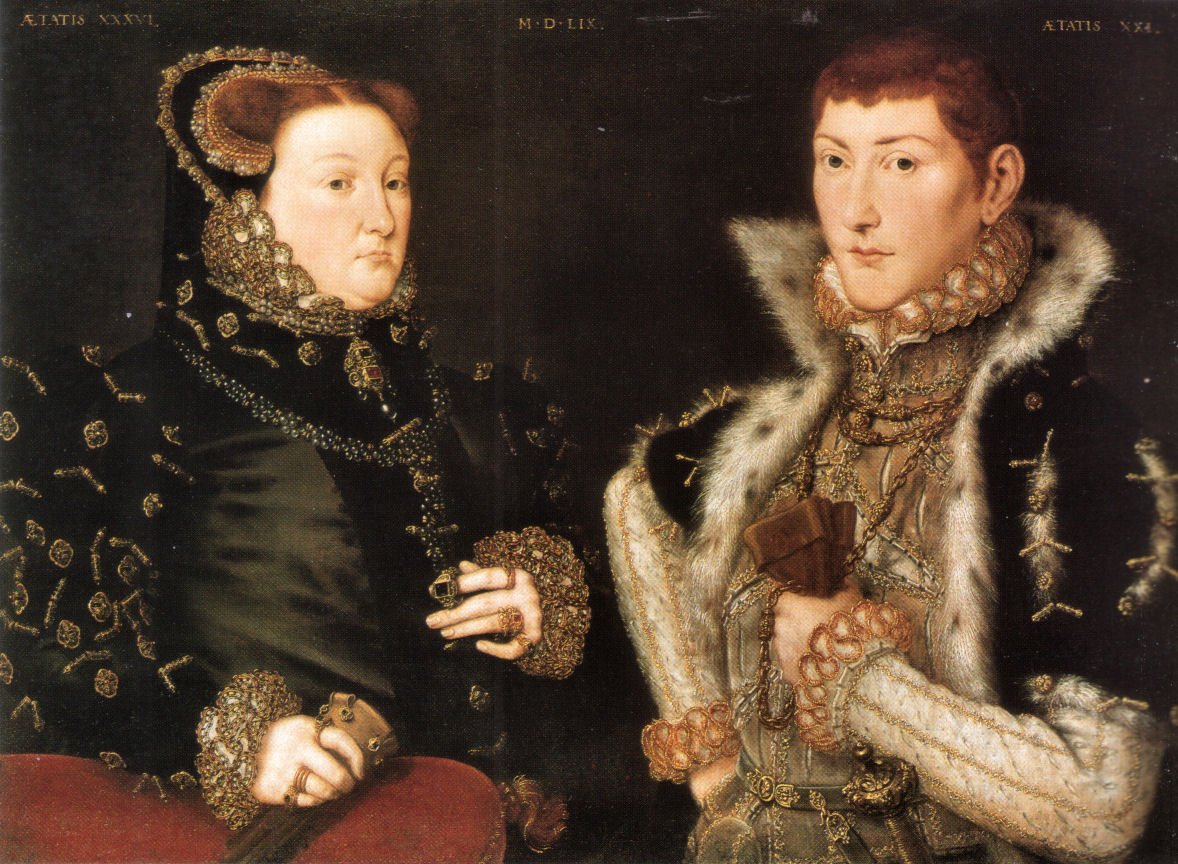
Gowns decorated with gold aiglets, 1559

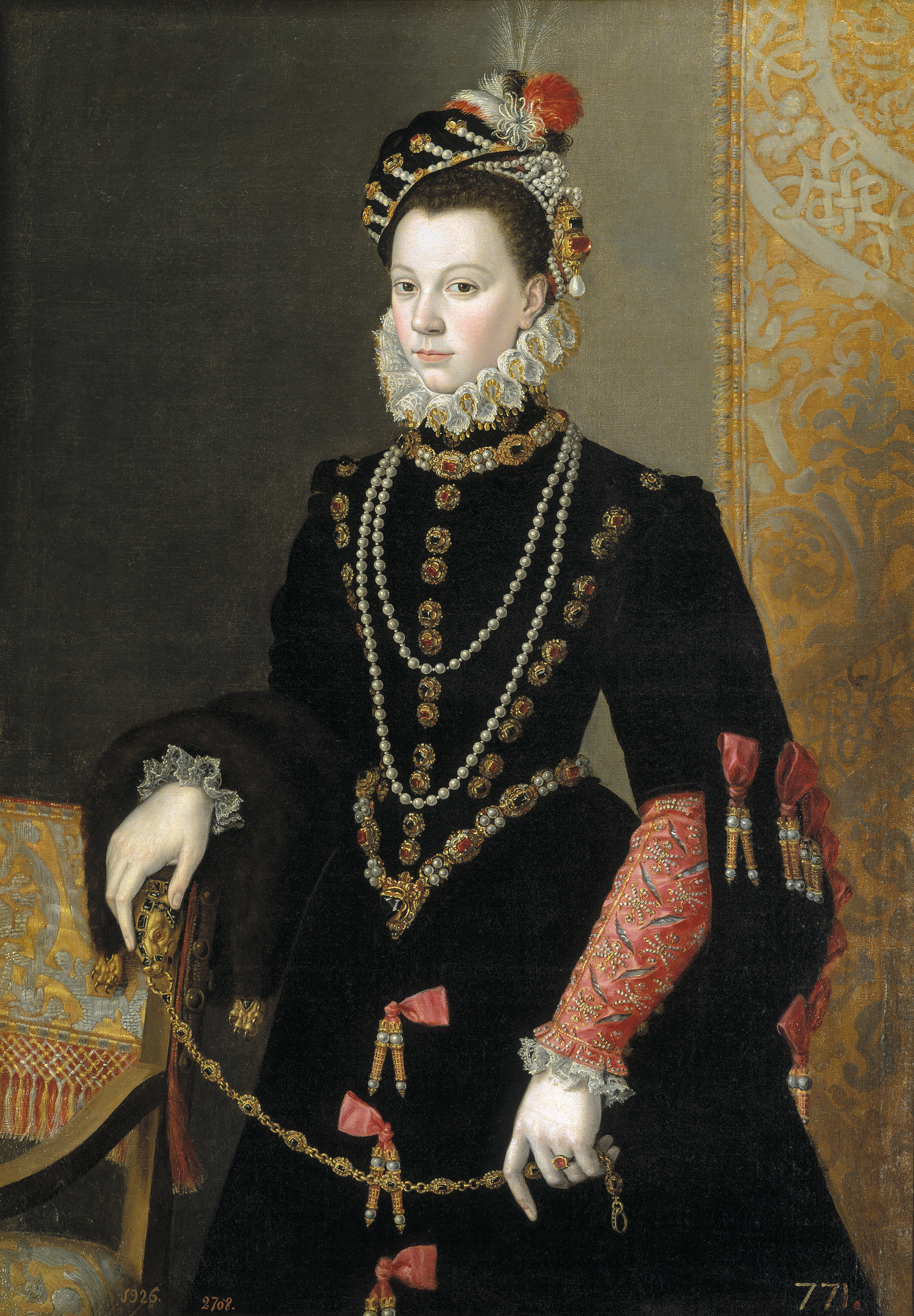
Rose ribbons tipped with large aiglets set with pearls, c. 1560s

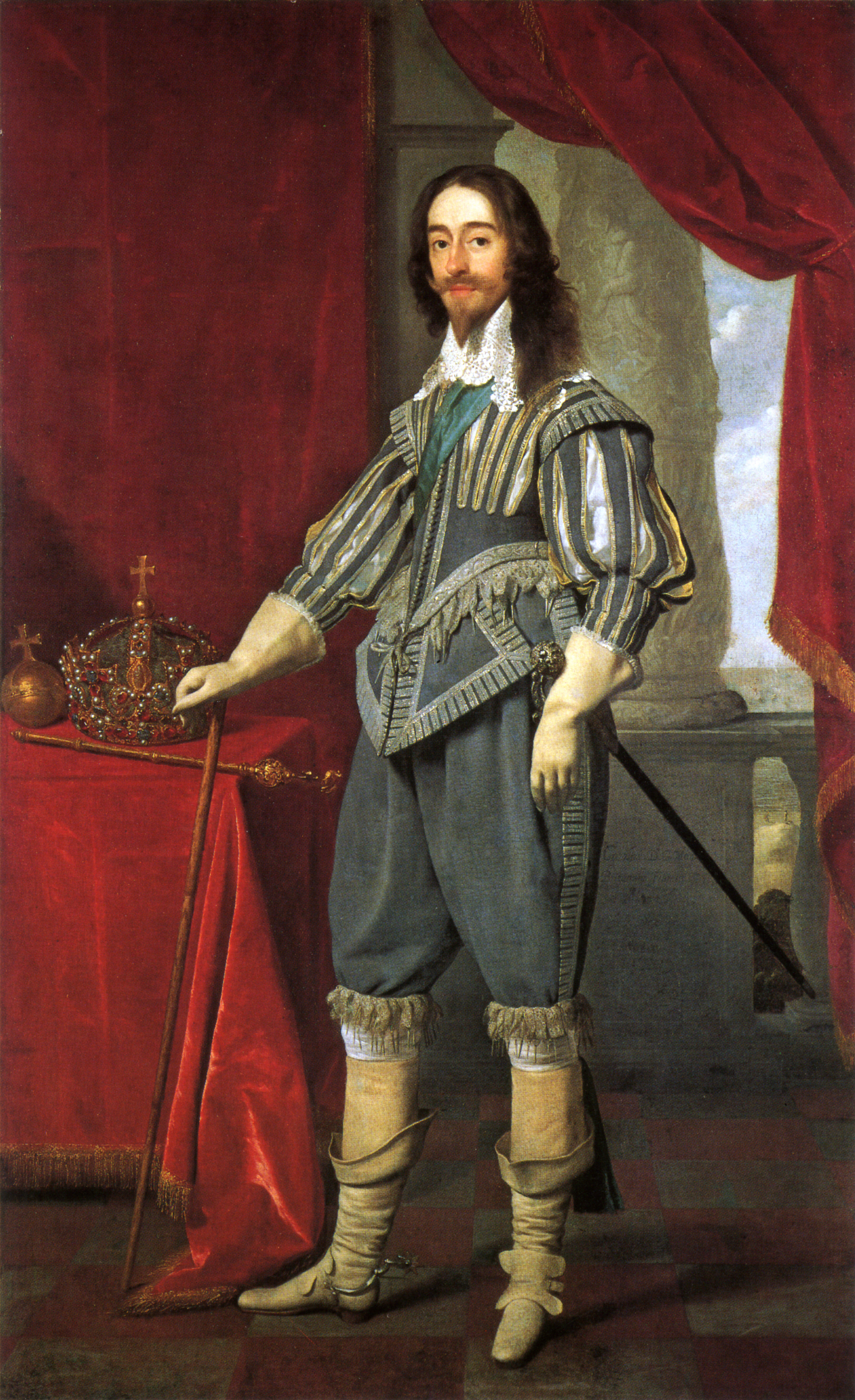
Doublet and hose with ribbon points tipped with aiglets, 1630s

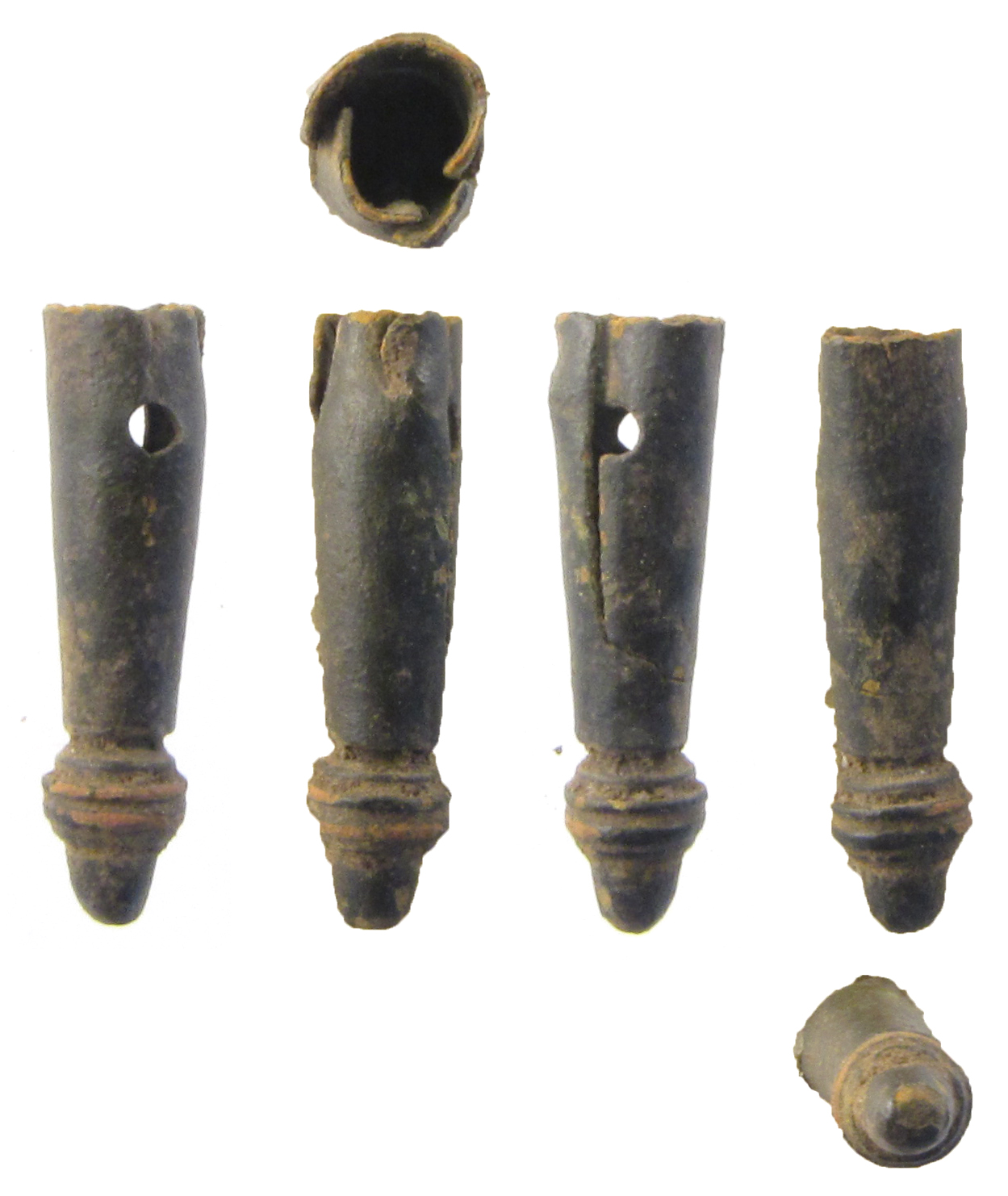
Surviving lace tag, ca. 1500–1700, found in Lincolnshire

== Military usage ==
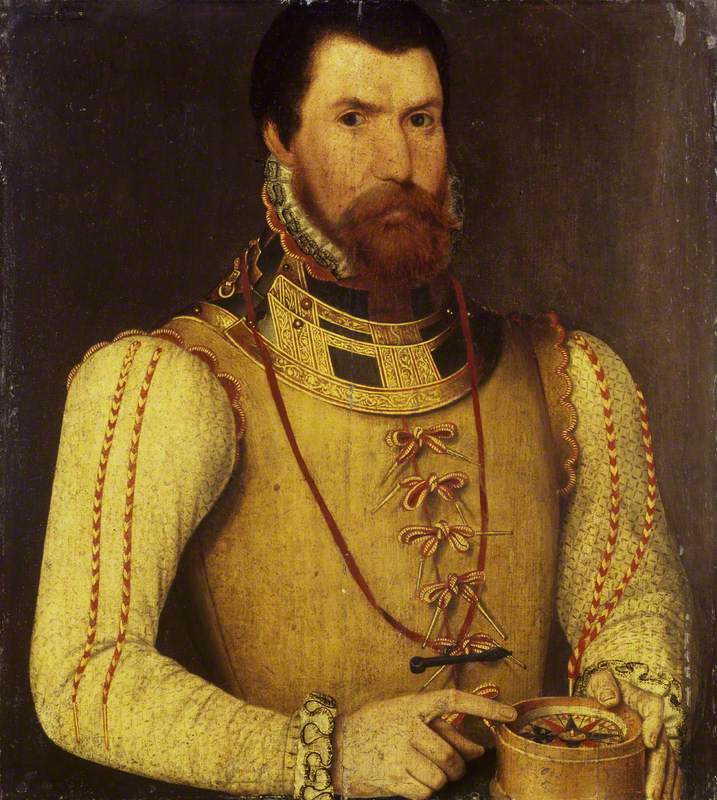
Lord High Admiral Clinton in an arming doublet of 1562, showing the decorative points or laces with metal tips for securing armour.

=== Argentina ===
Aiguillettes are worn on the right shoulder by armed forces officers serving in specific positions, such as aide-de-camp to the President, the Minister of Defense, each service's chief of staff and unit commanding officers, and by military attachés to Argentinian embassies abroad. The color of the aiguillette may be golden, silver or tan, depending the nature of the assignment.

Olive green aiguillettes are worn with the combat uniform in very special circumstances, such as ceremonies and inspections. Otherwise, aiguillettes are not worn with the combat uniform. A special red aiguillette is worn by the adjutants to the commanding officers of the Horse Grenadiers Regiment (the presidential guard) and the Military Academy. Also, a red aiguillette is worn on the left shoulder by the senior NCO of each Army unit. A thinner, yellow aiguillette is worn on the right shoulder by NCOs who have completed the instructor course.

In the Navy, adjutants to very senior officers wear golden aiguillettes on the left shoulder.

=== Australia ===
Aiguillettes distinguish officers of Flag, General and Air rank in specific command appointments, military attachés and aides-de-camp. Most senior officers and aides-de-camp to the Governor-General or state governors wear the aiguillette on the right shoulder, whilst military attachés and staff aides-de-camp wear the aiguillette on the left. Royal aiguillettes are of plain gold, naval aiguillettes are of blue and gold, army aiguillettes are of red and gold, air force aiguillettes of light blue and gold.

The Governor-General of Australia, as the Commander in Chief of the Australian Defence Force, is entitled to wear a uniform on which an aiguillette made of platinum is worn.

=== Canada ===
Aiguillettes are worn by officers in specific appointments to specific principals. For the following appointments the aiguillette is worn on the right shoulder:

- Aide-de-camp to His Majesty the King of Canada and other members of the Royal family;
- Aide-de-camp to the Governor-General of Canada;
- Aide-de-camp to Lieutenant-Governors of provinces;
- Aide-de-camp to visiting foreign heads of state; and
- Honorary member of the Royal Medical Household.

For other appointments, the aiguillette is worn on the left shoulder:

- Attachés as part of an embassy or consulate;
- Staff officer to the Minister of National Defence;
- Aides-de-camp / flag lieutenants to general / flag officers; and
- Officers appointed as personal assistants to senior officers, Ministers of the Crown, visiting military or civilian officials, dignitaries of foreign nations.

For all regal and vice-regal appointments, the distinguishing badge or cipher of the principal is worn on the shoulder strap or shoulder board.

Obsolete pattern aiguillettes braided with a coloured stripe may be worn until replaced by officers holding appointments to Lieutenant-Governors of provinces or military / civilian principals.

For RCN officers, since the uniform jacket does not normally include shoulder straps, the aiguillette is secured under a fully-corded shoulderboard worn on the right shoulder for regal and vice-regal appointments, and under a hard shoulderboard with a corded knot worn on the left shoulder for all other appointments.

For RCAF officers, since the uniform jacket does not normally include shoulder straps, there is a small attachment hook worn on the appropriate shoulder to which the aiguillette is fastened.

For Army officers, the aiguillette is secured under the appropriate shoulder strap (left or right) and the cipher or badge (if appropriate) is worn on that shoulder strap.

For all branches, the end of the cord near the hanging ends is fastened to a concealed button under the left or right jacket lapel as appropriate.

=== Denmark ===
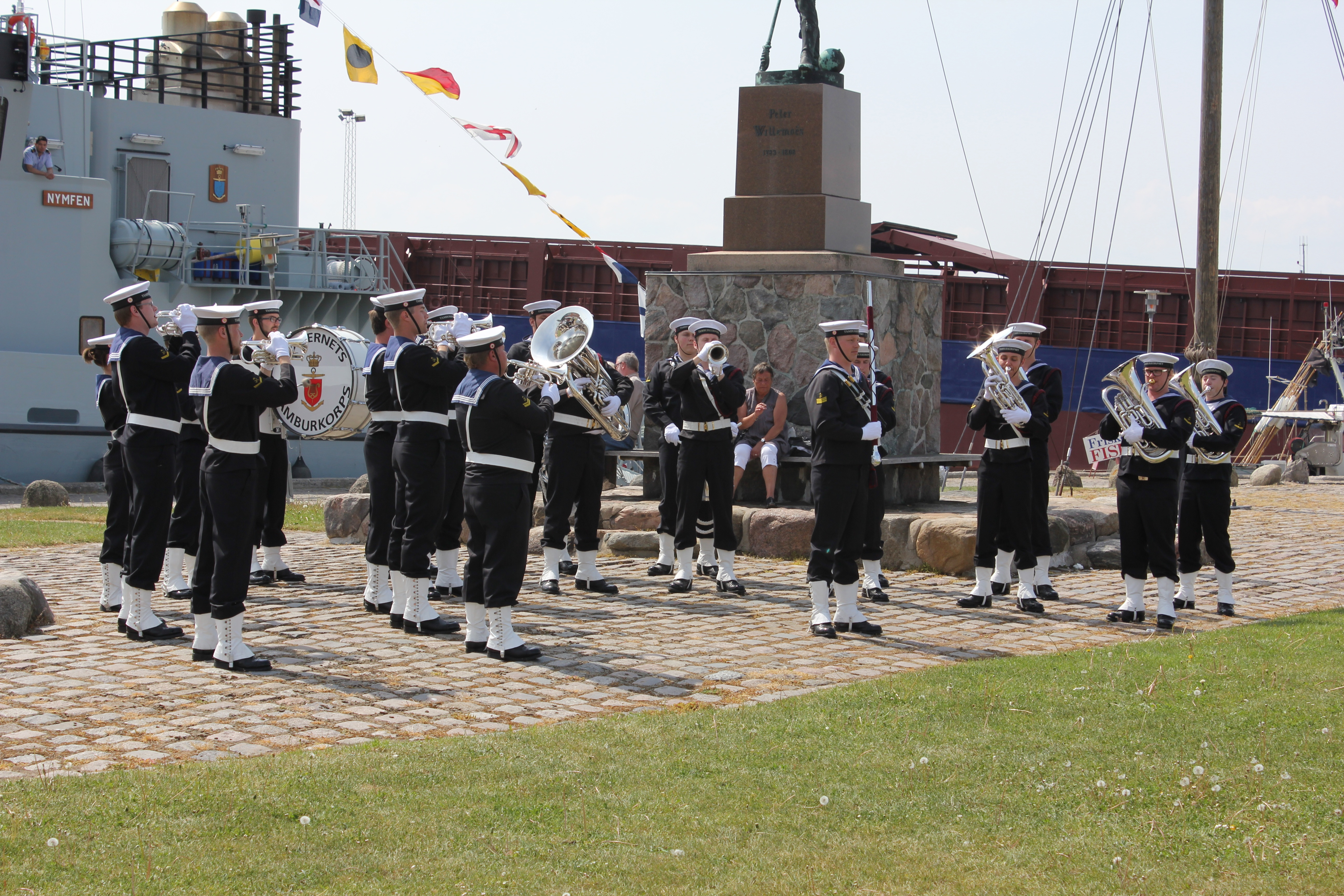
Royal Danish Naval Band with red aiguillettes

The Danish military uses aiguillettes for a number of different positions.

- Blue and yellow: Danish troops stationed with UNFICYP
- Blue and red: the Bugle Corps of the Guard Hussar Regiment Mounted Squadron
- Red: Royal Danish Naval Band
- Green: Danish military police
- Gold: Adjutants

=== France ===
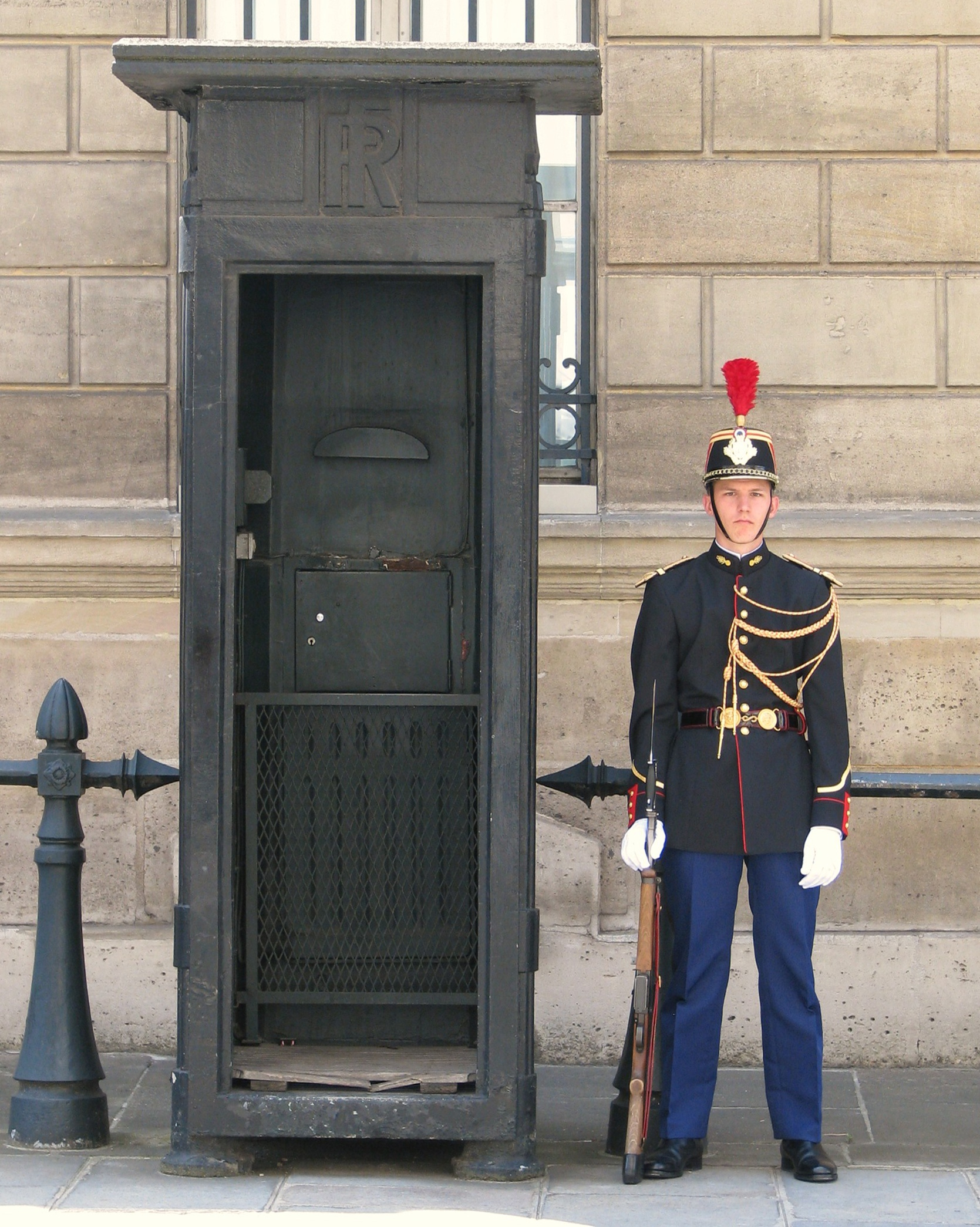
Republican Guard wearing a gold-wire aiguillette on the left shoulder

The aiguillettes are worn only with the dress uniform. There are several types of aiguillettes in the French military:

- Aiguillettes on the right shoulder are worn by officers filling certain duties.
  - Staff officers in the President's staff, the Prime Minister's staff, the Minister of Defence's staff and the Maréchaux's Staff. The aiguillette is always in gold wire.
  - The aides-de-camp to the President, the Prime Minister, the Chancellor of the Légion d'honneur, the Chief of the Defence Staff and the DGA. The aiguillette can be silver or gold, depending on the officer's corps. The AdC to the generals in the army and the air force and all the staff officers in the navy can also wear this aiguillette.
  - The military attachés of an embassy. The aiguillette is always in gold wire.
- Aiguillettes on the left shoulder are worn by all members of some units:
  - The Gendarmes. The aiguillette is white for the Gendarmerie départementale and gold for the Gendarmerie mobile, including the Garde Républicaine.
  - The Bands. This aiguillette can be blue, red, or gold.

Aiguillettes should not be confused with fourragères, which can be worn in the same way on the left shoulder in parade dress.

=== Germany ===
In the German armies, including the Imperial German Army and the Imperial German Navy, the adjutant generals or admirals wore the Adjutantenschnur or Achselband (adjutant cord or aguilette) on the right shoulder as of 1863 in gold, the generals à la suite and the Flügeladjutanten in silver. There were initially several experimental forms in the Reichswehr.

On 29 June 1935, so-called shoulder straps were introduced into the German Wehrmacht and were worn on certain occasions, e.g. at parades. Adjutants wore armpit cords as their badge of activity. In the National People's Army, the border troops of the GDR and the GDR People's Navy, a silver-colored armpit cord with silver tips for LaSK/LSK/LV/GT and gold-colored tips for the People's Navy has also been introduced for officers since 1976; the version for generals and admirals was gold-colored. In the Bundeswehr it is worn by attachés, officers of protocol, flag escort officers, greeting and liaison officers of the Navy as well as (if these tasks are carried out by officers) wake guards and medal cushion bearers.

=== Ghana ===
In Ghana, aiguillettes form part of the ceremonial uniforms of commissioned officers in the army and other security services including the police, prisons service, fire service, and customs and immigration. Senior police officers wear white aiguillettes with dark-blue uniforms, prison officers also wear yellow aiguillettes over the official ceremonial number one uniform while customs and immigration officials wear red aiguillettes with olive-green outfits. When worn, the aiguillettes denote on-duty status.

=== Greece ===
Aiguillettes are worn by the aides-de-camp to the President of the Hellenic Republic. The President's Adjutants wears it on the right shoulder.

=== Ireland ===
Aiguillettes are worn by the aides-de-camp to the President and Taoiseach. The President's ADC wears it on the right shoulder, the Taoiseach's ADC on the left.

Civil Defence (Cosaint Sibhialta) personnel wear a white aiguillette on their dress uniform.

Gold aiguillettes are also worn by officers in the Defence Forces with their mess dress uniform. They are worn on the left hand shoulder.

=== Israel ===
In the IDF, soldiers who wear an aiguillette are mostly instructors.
List of aiguillette's colors and roles in the IDF:

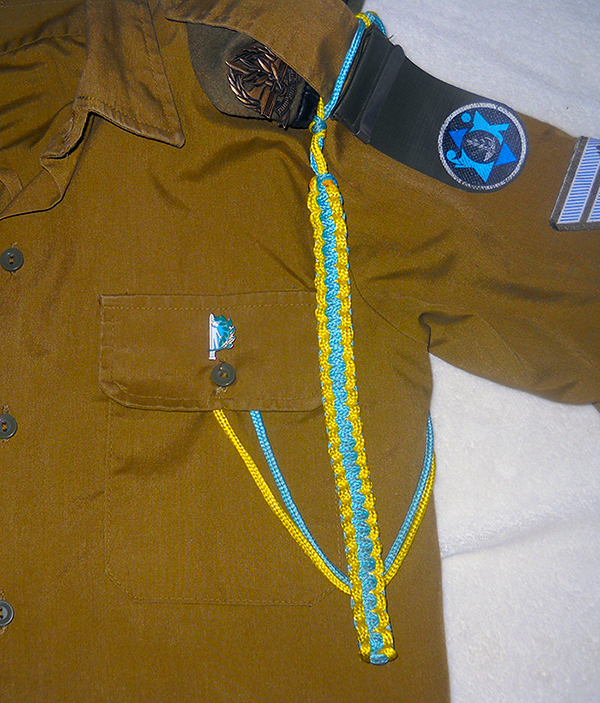
IDF uniforms with azure & yellow aiguillette of the casualties & City Officers administration

- Green & White- Military intelligence instructors (mainly)
- Black- training staff (mainly)
- Blue - Navy instructors
- Blue & Red- Military Police
- Red (right side)- IDF orchestra
- Red (Left side)- Senior Navy instructors (mainly)
- Purple- Service Rights Staff
- Blue & White- Unit's NCO
- White- Security guards
- Gray- Education instructors
- Green- General instructors
- Brown- Diagnostic crew (mainly)
- Gold- discipline NCO
- Orange & Azure- Search and Rescue units
- Orange & Black- Combat Engineering Corps
- Yellow & Black- WMD instructors
- Azure- Off-road vehicle operators (mainly)
- Azure & Green- Off-road vehicle operators instructors
- Azure & Yellow- Casualties & City Officers administration
- Azure & Purple- Reserve mobilization
- Green & Red- Civil population emergency instructors
- Golden- Military attaché
- Black & Creme- Military Rabbinate

In the Israeli Police, policemen mainly wear a black aiguillette, and Israeli Border Police policemen wear a dark green aiguillette.

=== Russia ===
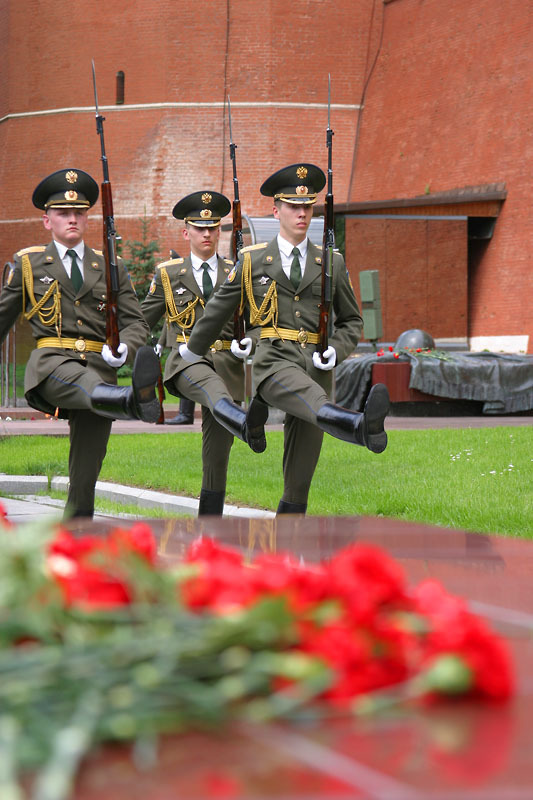
Soldiers of Prezidentskiy polk (The Presidential Regiment), Alexander Garden, Moscow

Aiguillettes are worn by honor guard personnel. A single silver aiguillette is worn on enlisted cut uniforms of minor detachments. A single gold aiguillette is worn on officer cut uniforms of minor detachments. A double gold aiguillette is worn on officer cut uniforms of major detachments. All personnel of major detachments wear officer cut uniforms. Demobilized soldiers also often decorate their uniforms with makeshift aiguillettes.

=== Singapore ===
Aiguillettes are worn on the right shoulder by officers of certain appointments only. They include the:

- Chief of Defence Force (CDF)
- Commissioner of Police (CP)
- Commissioner of the Singapore Civil Defence Force
- Aides-de-camp (ADC) to the President
- Honorary aides-de-camp to the President
- Military attachés and assistant military attachés
- MA/SA/NA to the Chief of Defence Force and service chiefs

Aiguillettes are also worn on the left shoulder by musicians of the Singapore Armed Forces Band and the Singapore Police Force Band.

Musicians of the Singapore Armed Forces Band wears a red and gold aiguillette while Director of Musics of the Singapore Armed Forces Band wear a full gold aiguillette.

Student musicians from both the National Cadet Corps Command Band and National Police Cadet Corps Band similarly wear aiguillettes mirroring the respective parent bodies.

In Singapore, ADCs who are officers of the Singapore Armed Forces and the Singapore Civil Defence Force wear gold aiguillettes and police officers wear silver aiguillettes. Singapore Armed Forces ADCs wear a gold braid lanyard in lieu of an aiguillette when in No. 3 and No. 5(T).

Additionally the newly commissioned ADC badges are worn across all five services' no.4 uniform.

=== Sri Lanka ===
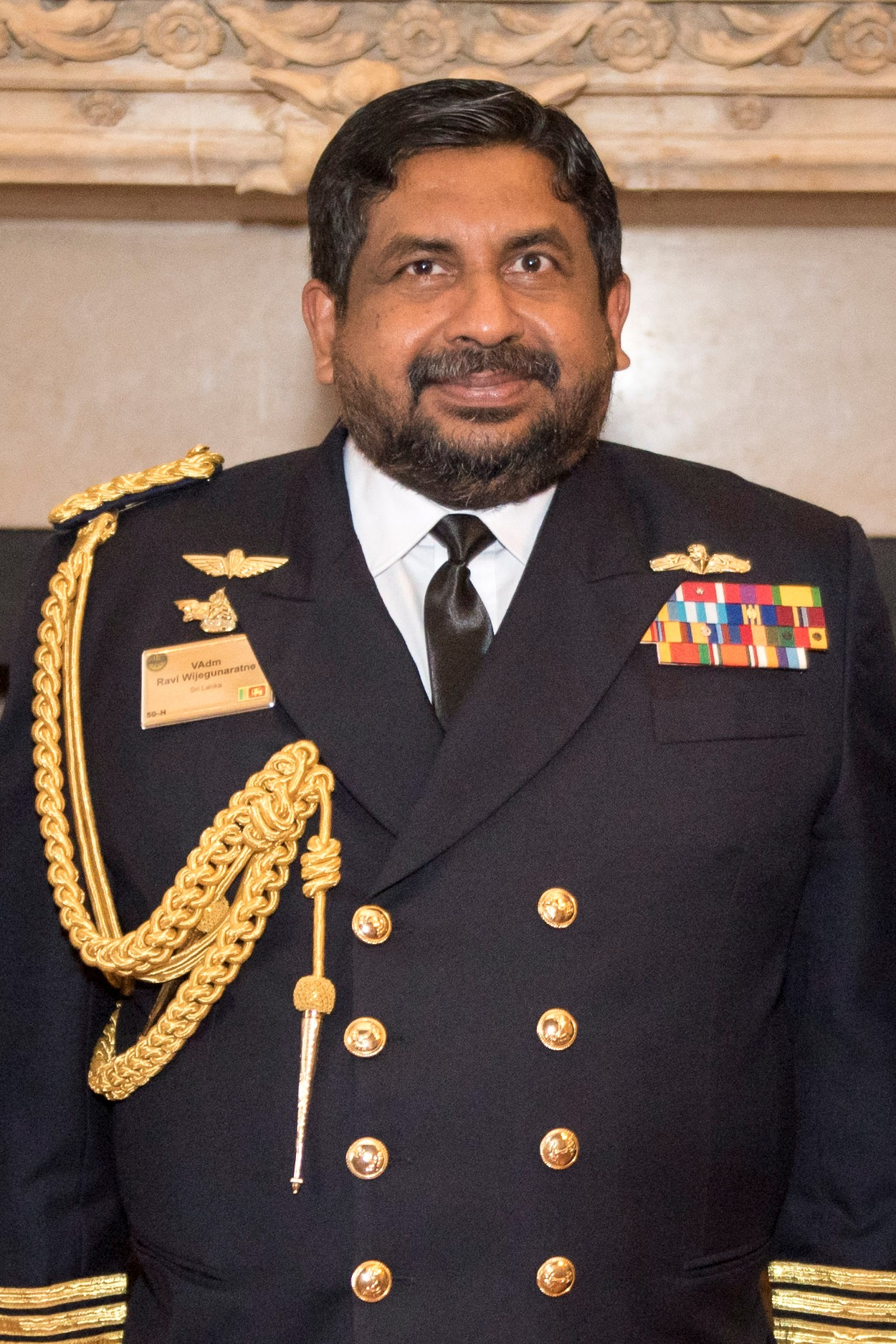
Full Aiguillettes (No. 1A) worn by the Chief of Defence Staff.

In Sri Lanka, full aiguillettes are worn by members of the personal staff of the President of Sri Lanka and General officers, flag officers and air officers, while half aiguillettes are worn by the Colonels and Lieutenant Colonels in ceremonial uniforms.

- Aiguillettes (No. 1A) (Full Aiguillettes) of gold cord are worn on the right shoulder by; service commanders and officers of the four-star rank and above on uniforms No. 1, 2, 3, 4.
- Aiguillettes (No. 1B) (Full Aiguillettes) of gold (and red orris basket in the case of Army) cord are worn on the right shoulder by; Aides-de-camp to the President of Sri Lanka and Aides-de-camp to visiting heads of state (in their presence) on uniforms No. 1.
- Aiguillettes (No. 2A) (Full Aiguillettes) of gold cord are worn on the left shoulder by; by officers of two-star rank and one-star rank on uniforms No. 1, 2, 3, 4.
- Aiguillettes (No. 2B) (Full Aiguillettes) of gold (and red orris basket in the case of Army, black basket in the case of Navy) cord are worn on the left shoulder by; Military Assistants and Aides-de-camps to general, flag and air officers.
- Aiguillettes (No. 3) (Half Aiguillettes) of gold cord joined in the front and back by gilt cloth with a single metal aglet are worn on the left shoulder by Colonels and Lieutenant Colonels in (ceremonial) uniforms No. 1, 2, 3, 4.

In the Sri Lanka Police, the Inspector General of Police, wear gold aiguillettes on the right shoulder, while Senior gazetted police officers wear black aiguillettes on the left shoulder in both formal and ceremonial dress.

=== Sweden ===
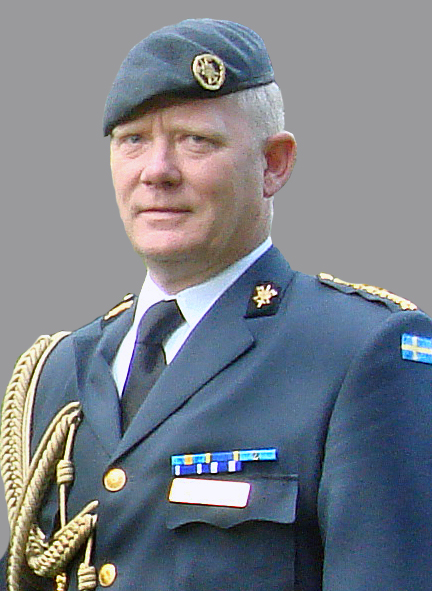
Large aiguillette m/1816, used in Sweden.

The Swedish Armed Forces uses three types of aiguillettes. All aiguillettes come in gold or silver braid depending on the regiment of the wearer, Royal Guard regiments use silver due to historical reasons, all others gold.

- Large aiguillette m/1816 (Sw.: Stor ägiljett m/1816) is worn on the right shoulder by officers on the staff of HM the King of Sweden, aide-de-camps of members of the Royal Family and by commissioned colonels and naval captains. It is also permissible to be worn by officers (except generals) of the staff of the Defense Force, and former officers of the Swedish general staff.
- Small aiguillette m/1889 (Sw.: Liten ägiljett m/1889) is worn on the right shoulder by the on duty adjutant of the King in Service dress uniform, adjutants of government ministers, the Supreme Commander of the Swedish Armed Forces and general officers.
- Aiguillette m/55 (Sw.: Ägiljett m/55) is worn on the left shoulder by military attachés in Service dress uniform in the country of his or her accreditation; it is only used in Sweden during state visits.

In Sweden there is a distinction between the aiguillettes mentioned above, and other cords used on uniforms in the Royal Swedish Navy and the Swedish Air Force.

=== United Kingdom ===
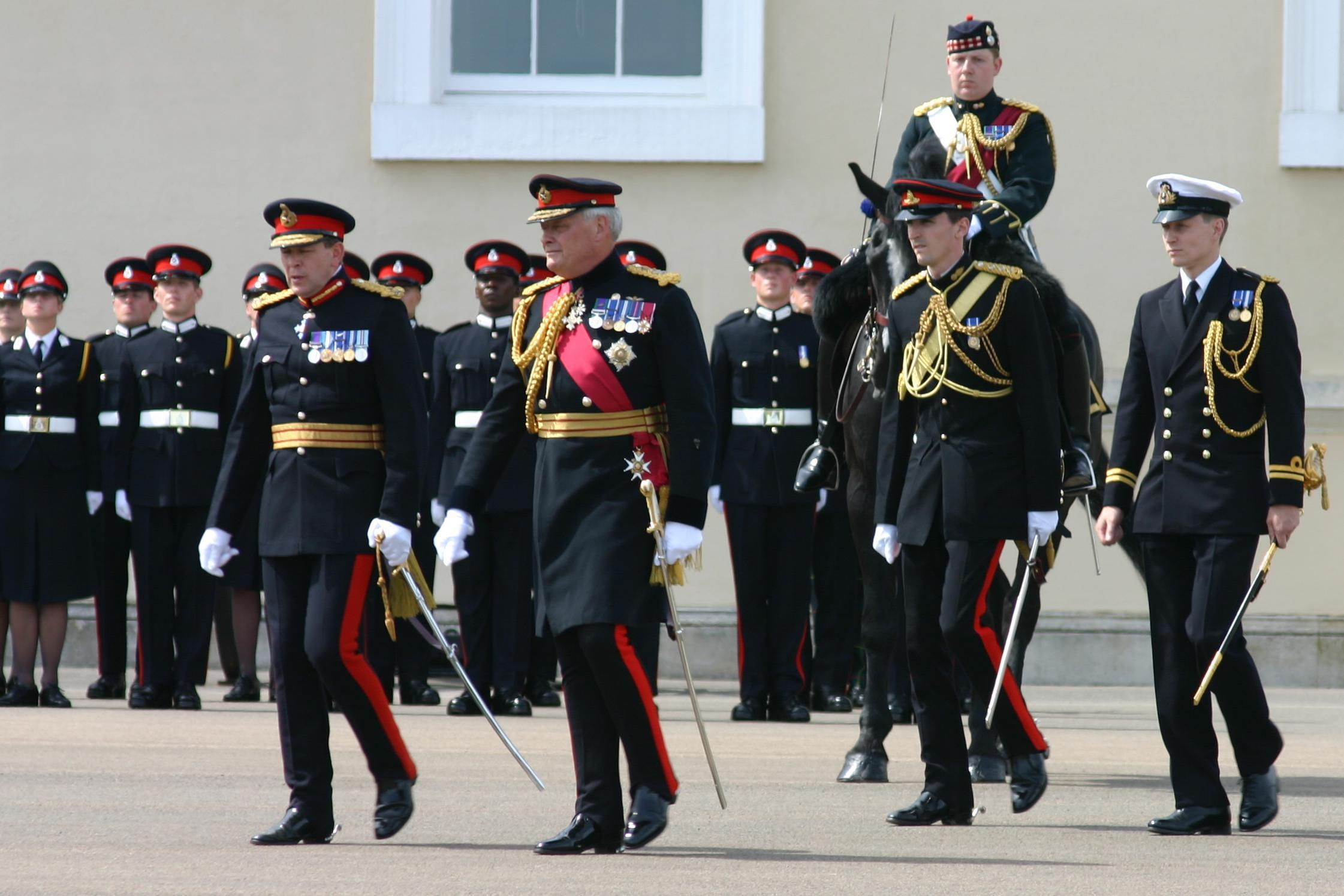
Royal Aiguillette worn by the Chief of Defence Staff and Staff Aiguillettes worn by ADCs

There are four types of aiguillette worn by the British Armed Forces.

- Aiguillettes (1st Class or Royal) are of gold-wire cord and are worn on the right shoulder by, among others, admirals of the fleet, field marshals and marshals of the RAF; honorary physicians, honorary chaplains, honorary surgeons and aides-de-camp to the Sovereign; and equerries to members of the royal family. Some appointments carry the privilege of wearing a miniature Sovereign's Cypher on the points of the aiguillettes. These aiguillettes are also worn by commissioned officers of the Household Cavalry (in full dress only). They are worn on the left shoulder in full dress by warrant officers of the Household Cavalry.
- Aiguillettes (2nd Class or Board) are of gold and dark blue, crimson or light blue depending if worn by Royal Navy, Army or RAF officers and are worn on the right shoulder by, among others, military members of the Defence Board and each Service Board and the personal staff of governors. A simplified version with no coils is worn on the left shoulder by staff corporals, corporals of horse and lance corporals of horse of the Household Cavalry in full dress.
- Aiguillettes (3rd Class or Staff) are of gold and dark blue, crimson or light blue depending if worn by Royal Navy, Army or RAF officers. They are worn on the left shoulder by, among others, attachés, assistants and aides-de-camp.
- Simple aiguillettes are worn by lance corporals of the Household Cavalry and by bandsmen of Dragoon Guards and Dragoon regiments in full dress.

Aiguillettes are also worn by some police officers.

- The Commissioner of the Metropolitan Police wears silver aiguillettes in both formal and ceremonial dress.
- The Commissioner and Assistant Commissioner of the City of London Police wear gold aiguillettes on the right shoulder in ceremonial dress. Some officers of that force also wear gold aiguillettes on the left shoulder in ceremonial dress.

=== United States ===
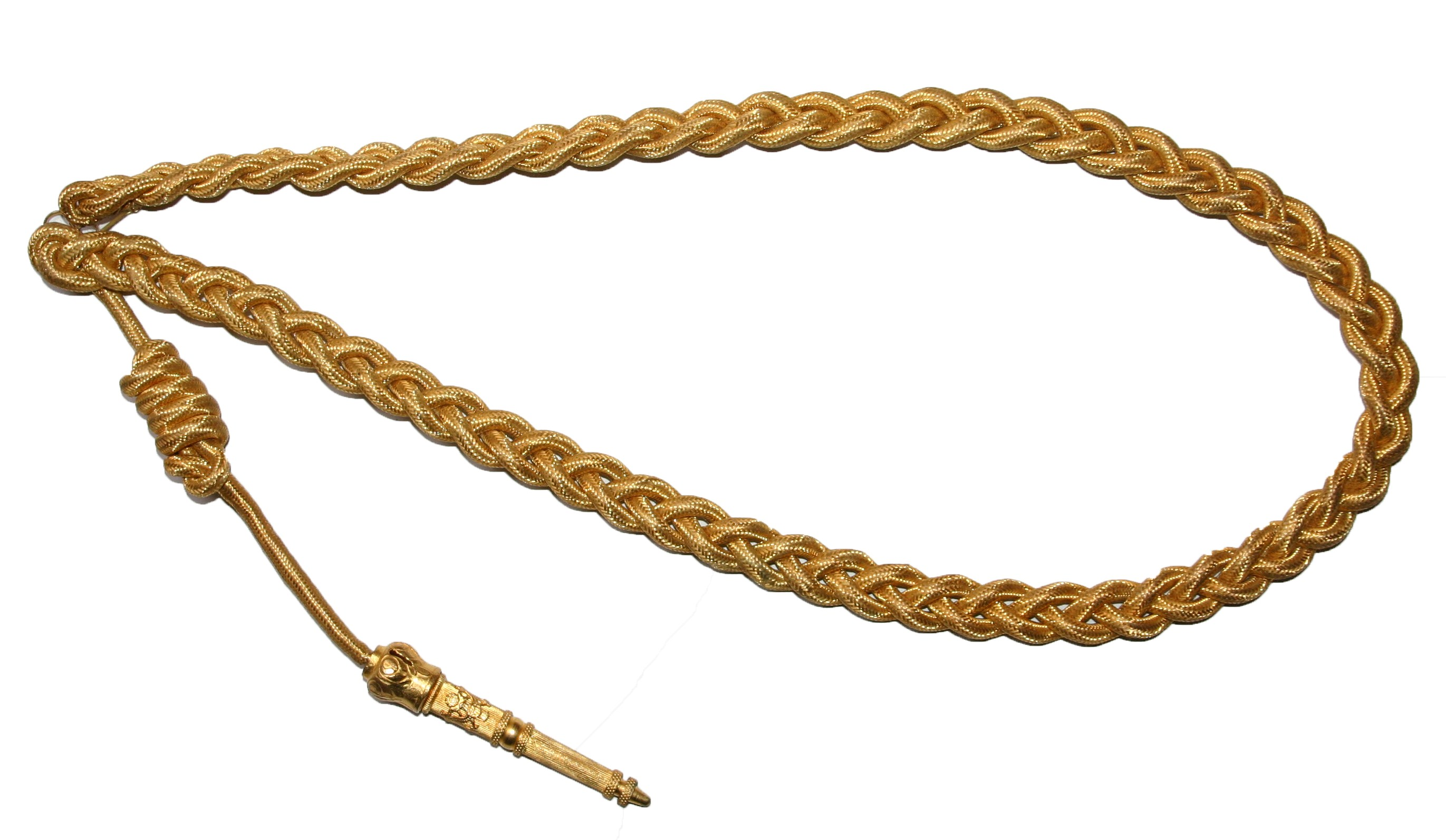
US Army Service Aiguillette worn on the left arm by aides-de-camp, Army attaches, and assistant Army attaches and on the right arm by aides assigned to the President, White House, First Family, and foreign heads of state with the Class A Uniform and Army Service Uniform

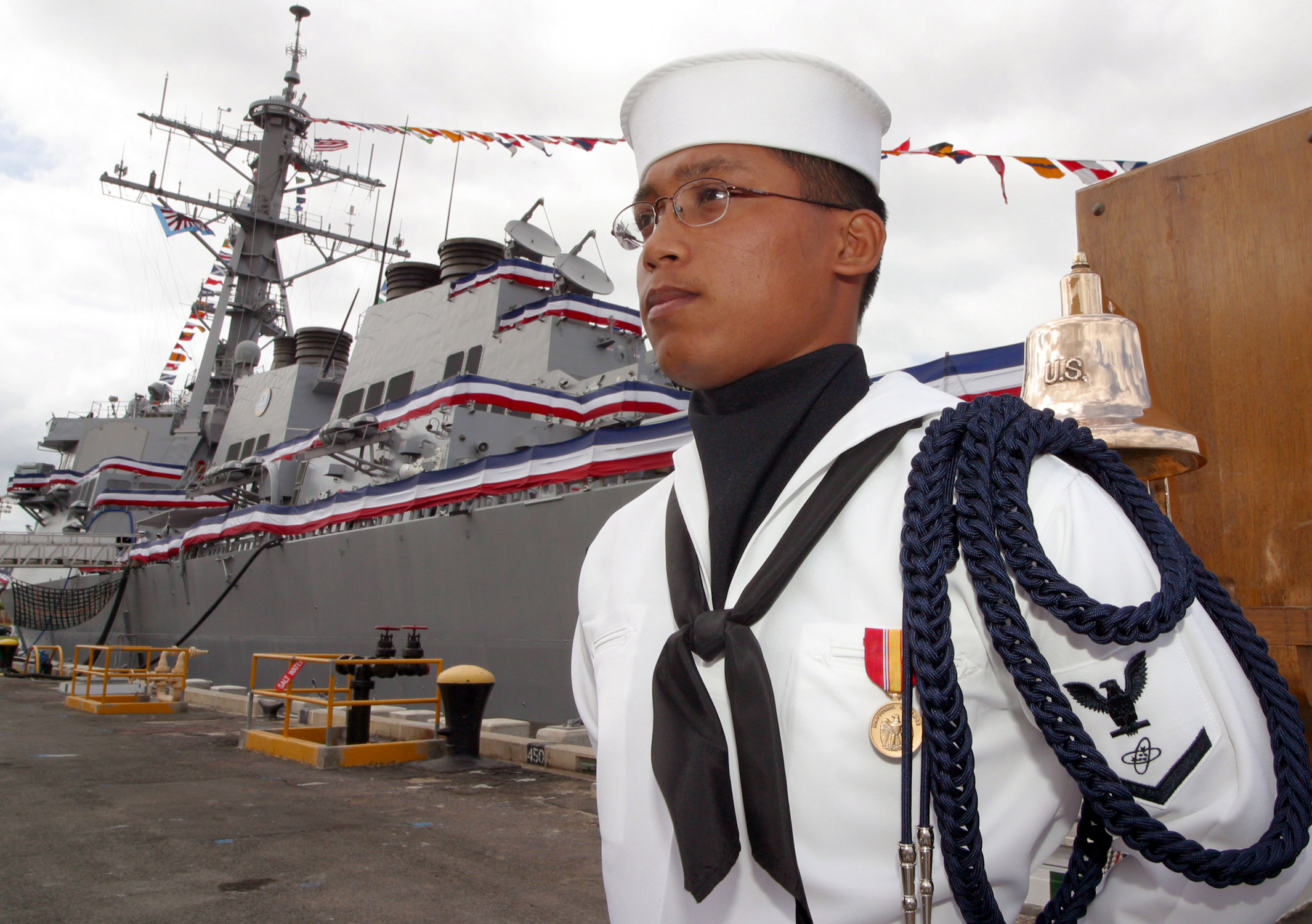
U.S. Navy Ceremonial Guard Dress Aiguillette (White Uniform): one dark blue braided loop and two single loops

The aiguillette is worn on the right shoulder by military aides to the President and the Vice President. It is worn on the left shoulder by military assistants to the Secretary of Defense and the Secretary of Homeland Security, aides to the Service Secretaries (Secretary of the Army, Secretary of the Navy & Secretary of the Air Force), aide to the NOAA Administrator, military attachés, General Staff Corps officers, and aides to flag officers. The cord colors are gold for the Army and silver for the Air Force, gold and blue for the Coast Guard, Navy and NOAA Commissioned Officer Corps, with one braid "per star" of the Flag Officer (one for RDML, two for RADM, three for VADM and four for ADM), and gold and red for the Marines, with the number of braids corresponding to the rank of the General Officer similar to the Navy use. The gold cord aiguillette is worn by the directors of the United States Marine Band, while the enlisted personnel wear aiguillettes of white cord.

A red aiguillette is worn on the left shoulder by United States Navy Recruit Division commanders, whereas a blue aiguillette is worn by Recruit Division commanders in training. Recruit Division commanders wearing these are referred colloquially as "red ropes" and "blue ropes" respectively. The U.S. Navy Ceremonial Guard in Washington, D.C. wears a blue aiguillette on summer white uniforms and a white one on winter blue uniforms. From 1983 until the issue of the campaign hat, Women Marine Drill Instructors wore a red aiguillette similar to the Navy.

A blue aiguillette is worn on the left shoulder by military training leaders at technical training bases. Student airmen leaders at technical training bases (sometimes called "ropes" in reference to the aiguillette) also wear aiguillettes, with green representing the lowest level of student leadership, yellow representing the intermediate level of student leadership, and red representing the highest level of student leadership. Students wearing a white rope are commonly referred to as chapel guides, and are charged with providing social or moral support to their fellow airmen. Airmen who wear the black rope are experts in drill, choir, or ceremonies, and pride themselves on appearance and uniform wear. Airmen who wear a blue and white rope are members of the drum & bugle corps for their base. In the United States Air Force, honor guard members wear a silver aiguillette on the left shoulder.

== Other military cords ==
The aiguillette should not be confused with the fourragère, which is used by a number of European militaries as well as by some United States units awarded decorations in the First and Second World Wars.

Nor should it be confused with the Schützenschnur, a multi-weapon marksmanship decoration awarded by Germany to qualifying soldiers of NATO countries serving in Germany.

A similar, albeit thicker, device, the Infantry Shoulder Cord, is worn on the right shoulder by all enlisted soldiers and officers in the United States Army whose primary Military Occupational Specialty is infantry.

Many military units wear dress lanyards.
