= Battle of Hill 282 =

1950 battle of the Korean War

- Part of the Korean War
Location	Hill 282, near Songju, Korea
Result	Stalemate

Belligerents
United Nations: United Kingdom; United States	North Korea

Casualties and losses
(United Kingdom) 17 killed or missing 79 wounded	Unknown
- American P-51 Mustangs, having no contact with friendly ground troops, mistook them for enemy North Korean forces.

The Battle of Hill 282 took place on 23 September 1950 during the Korean War, and involved the 1st Battalion Argyll and Sutherland Highlanders in an assault on this position as part an operation by 27th British Commonwealth Brigade on the Naktong River.

On 22 September 1950, 1st Battalion Argyll and Sutherland Highlanders moved up to attack Hill 282 (35.905°N 128.324°E) near Songju. Starting before dawn on 23 September, B and C Companies after an hour's climb seized the crest of Hill 282 surprising a Korean People's Army (KPA) force at breakfast. Across a saddle, and nearly a mile away to the southwest, higher Hill 388 (35.9°N 128.313°E) dominated the one they had just occupied. C Company started toward it.

KPA troops occupying this hill already were moving to attack the one just taken by the British. The North Koreans supported their attack with artillery and mortar fire, which began falling on the British. The action continued throughout the morning with KPA fire increasing in intensity. Shortly before noon, with American artillery fire inexplicably withdrawn and the five supporting U.S. tanks unable to bring the KPA under fire because of terrain obstacles, the Argylls called for an air strike on the North Korean-held Hill 388.

Just after noon the Argylls heard the sound of approaching aircraft. Three United States Air Force P-51 Mustangs of the 18th Fighter Bomber Wing circled Hill 282 where the British displayed their white recognition panels. The KPA on Hill 388 also displayed white panels. To his dismay, Captain Radcliff of the tactical air control party had a defective radio which prevented him from establishing contact with the P-51s and it was later revealed that several British forward air controllers had yet to notify the pilots of proper air recognition panels. At 12:15, the Mustangs, confused by the panels and no radio contact with friendly ground forces, dropped napalm bombs onto the Argylls' position and also strafed it with 50 calibre machine-gun fire.

The attack was over in two minutes and left the hilltop a sea of orange flame. Survivors plunged 50 feet (15 m) down the slope to escape the burning napalm. Major Kenneth Muir, second in command of the Argylls, who had led an ammunition resupply and litter-bearing party to the crest before noon, watching the flames on the crest die down, noticed that a few wounded men still held a small area on top. Acting quickly, he assembled about 30 men and led them back up the hill before approaching North Koreans reached the top. There, two bursts of automatic fire mortally wounded him as he and Major A. I. Gordon-Ingram, B Company commander, fired a 2-inch mortar. According to his Victoria Cross citation, Muir's last words as he was carried from the hilltop were "Neither the Gooks nor the US Air Force will drive the Argylls off this hill".

Gordon-Ingram counted only ten men with him able to fight, and some of them were wounded. His three Bren guns were nearly out of ammunition. At 15:00 the survivors were down at the foot of the hill.

The next day a count showed two officers and 11 men killed, four officers and 70 men wounded, and two men missing for a total of 89 casualties; of this number, the mistaken air attack caused approximately 60.

== See also ==
- List of post-1945 U.S. friendly-fire incidents with British victims
