= Infantry Shoulder Cord =

United States Army insignia

- Type: Military insignia
- Awarded for: Completion of One Station Unit Training or Advanced Individual Training (enlisted) or completion of U.S. Army Infantry School's Infantry Officer Basic Course (officers)
- Description: The shoulder cord is infantry blue. It is formed by a series of interlocking square knots around a center cord.
- Country: United States
- Presented by: Secretary of the Army
- Eligibility: U.S. Army Infantry personnel
- Status: Currently awarded
- Established: 1952; 74 years ago

The Infantryman Shoulder Cord is a United States military decoration worn over the right shoulder of all infantry-qualified U.S. Army soldiers. It is a fourragere in light blue, specifically PMS 5415 (dubbed "Infantry Blue" by the U.S. Army), worn under the right shoulder and under the right epaulette of a U.S. Army infantry soldier's Class A dress blue uniform jacket or Class B shirt. The cord is composed of a series of alternating left and right half knots that are tied around a leader cord to form a "Solomon bar".

== History ==
The modern Infantry blue cord is a simplified version of the breast and right shoulder cord worn in 1902 as part of the newly introduced full dress uniform of that date. This ceremonial item was in army, corps or departmental color (light-blue for infantry). During the Korean War General J. Lawton Collins, Chief of Staff for the Army, asked a group of advisers what could be done to enhance the morale of the fighting Infantryman. It was decided that they would receive special insignia, so that everyone would know that the soldier was an infantryman who would be fighting on the front lines.

A light-blue cord was created to be worn on the right shoulder of both infantry trained officers and enlisted men. Also, light-blue plastic disks were issued to be placed behind the metal "crossed rifles" Infantry branch of service insignia U.S. collar discs on Class A and Class B uniforms as well as on the U.S. coat of arms disc on the front of the service cap. The new enhancements were first worn by the 3rd U.S. Infantry Regiment ("The Old Guard"). The light-blue cord and disks became standard for all U.S. infantry soldiers in 1952.

== Qualification ==
The infantry blue cord is presented to all infantry-qualified soldiers in the U.S. Army at the end of their Advanced Individual Training. Commissioned officers earn their blue cord after graduating from the U.S. Army Infantry School's Infantry Officer Basic Course (IBOLC). Enlisted soldiers earn their infantry blue cords after successfully completing all Infantry Training Brigade requirements required for achieving the infantry MOS by graduating from 22 weeks of Infantry One Station Unit Training (OSUT), or twelve weeks of Infantry Advanced Individual Training (AIT) for those who go through "Basic" and AIT via Split Training Option (Split-Op) which is conducted at the United States Army Infantry School at Fort Benning, Georgia.

The infantry blue cord is authorized to be worn only by infantry-qualified U.S. Army soldiers currently assigned to an infantry unit in the active U.S. Army, U.S. Army Reserve, or Army National Guard. Only those with an infantry military occupational specialty such as 11A (infantry officers), 11B, or 11C. Other 11 series MOS holders (as both their primary and duty MOS) who may wear the cord are infantry soldiers assigned to an infantry slot that is not in an infantry unit (such as with infantry assigned to a cavalry unit) if authorized, or instructors, drill sergeants, or recruiters. Individuals holding the 11X designator do not wear the cord as this is an "unassigned" position designated for recruits who are contracted into the CMF (Career Management Field) 11 - Infantry.

Qualified infantry soldiers who are not assigned to an infantry unit, to include those who are an 11-series MOS holder transitioning to 18-series MOS, for example, (CMF 18 is the designation for the Army Special Forces MOS) may not wear the infantry blue cord or disks. Those soldiers who are assigned to an infantry unit may wear the infantry blue cord and disks until their transition to a non-Infantry unit is complete.

== Presentation ==
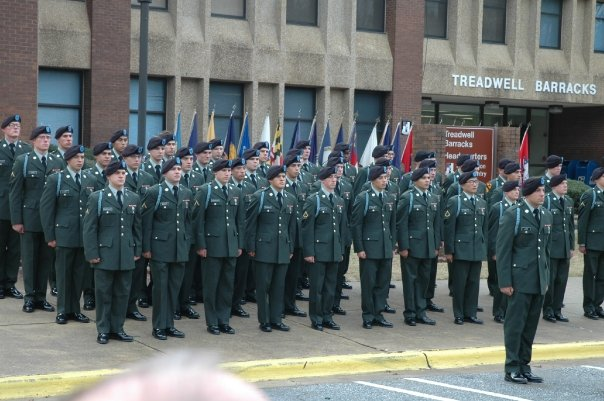
Newly qualified infantrymen receive their infantry blue cords at a "Turning Blue" ceremony in 2009, following 16 weeks of One Station Unit Training (OSUT), the day before graduation in front of their barracks at Fort Benning.

Today, enlisted graduates of infantry "One Station Unit Training" or "Split Training Option" receive their blue cord at the "Turning Blue" ceremony held the day before their graduation from Infantry advanced individual training (AIT). This ceremony typically follows a week-long field training exercise (FTX) including at least a 5-mile ruck march to the field, multiple force on force and team exercises that precede at least a 12-mile ruck march back to garrison. All other recruits first attend a 9-week basic combat training (BCT) course before moving on to their AIT in which they will have a similar ceremony. However, only those who have graduated the infantry school and maintain postings in infantry units OR certain branch immaterial units (i.e.: Drill Sergeant, Branch Detailed Recruiters, etc...) are authorized to wear the blue cord.

Graduates of the Infantry Basic Officer Leaders Course (formerly IOBC) must complete their two-week-long final FTX with a 16-mile tactical road march and a mock company attack. Prior to graduation and out-processing, students have their "Blue Cord" ceremony at Freedom Hall where their blue cords are pinned on them by their platoon trainer captain and NCOs. The staff sergeant or sergeant first class who pins on the blue cord then renders a salute recognizing the lieutenant's entry into the ranks of the infantry.

== See also ==
- Aiguillette
- Lanyard § Uniform accessories
