= Kenneth Muir (British Army officer) =

Korean War Victoria Cross winner (1912-1950)

- Major Kenneth Muir
- Born: 6 March 1912; Chester, Cheshire, England
- Died: 23 September 1950 (aged 38); Hill 282, near Songju, Korea
- Burial place: United Nations Memorial Cemetery, Busan
- Military career
- Allegiance: United Kingdom
- Branch: British Army
- Service years: 1932–1950
- Rank: Major
- Service number: 50980
- Unit: Argyll and Sutherland Highlanders
- Conflicts: North-West Frontier; Second World War; Korean War: Battle of Hill 282 †
- Awards: Victoria Cross; Mentioned in Despatches; Distinguished Service Cross (United States)

Major Kenneth Muir VC (6 March 1912 – 23 September 1950) was a British Army officer and a recipient of the Victoria Cross, the highest award for gallantry in the face of the enemy that can be awarded to British and Commonwealth forces.

== Military career ==
Muir was born on 6 March 1912, the son of Captain (later Colonel) Garnet Wolseley Muir, who became commanding officer of the Argyll and Sutherland Highlanders in 1923. Muir was educated at Malvern College and was commissioned 2nd lieutenant in the Argylls in 1932, aged 20. He served on the North-West Frontier of India from 1935 to 1938, and during the Second World War saw active service in the Sudan, North Africa, Italy, France, and Germany. At the end of the war, he held the rank of acting lieutenant-colonel and had been mentioned in dispatches.

After service with the provost marshal's branch of the War Office, in early 1950 Major Muir was posted to the Argylls' 1st Battalion in Hong Kong. In August 1950 the battalion moved to Korea, among the first British troops to join the United Nations forces in the Korean War.

=== Victoria Cross action ===
Major Muir was 38 years old, and second in command of the 1st Battalion, Argyll and Sutherland Highlanders during the Korean War, when the following deed took place at the Battle of Hill 282 for which he was posthumously awarded the VC:

On 23 September 1950, as part of the breakout from Pusan, the Argylls were ordered to take and hold Hill 282, near Songju, which was dominated by another higher feature, Hill 388, about 1500 metres to the west. Two companies of the battalion took the hill, but were heavily counter-attacked by superior numbers of North Koreans from Hill 388. The USAF also napalmed and machine-gunned the hill in an egregious ‘friendly fire’ incident. Muir had initially gone forward with a stretcher party to supervise the evacuation of the wounded. When the enemy started to launch a further series of attacks, Muir took command and galvanised the defence by personal example. On the hill's summit, where the fighting was most desperate, he directed fire, organised ammunition distribution, and collected the wounded into shelter, while encouraging others by his disregard for the heavy enemy fire hitting the hilltop.

Eventually, with losses mounting and enemy reinforcements continually arriving from Hill 388, Muir called for an American air strike on that hill. In spite of coloured recognition panels placed on Hill 282 to mark the Argylls' position, the aircraft attacked Hill 282 in error, the Argylls suffering heavy casualties. Despite this, Muir organised a successful counter-attack on the North Koreans with the twenty or so survivors. Finally, with only fourteen men unwounded, Muir was mortally wounded while firing a 2-inch mortar himself. His last words were: 'Neither the Gooks nor the US Air Force will drive the Argylls off this hill'. His citation noted that: "The effect of [Muir's] splendid leadership on the men was nothing short of amazing and it was entirely due to his magnificent courage and example and the spirit which he imbued in those about him that all wounded were evacuated from the hill, and, as was subsequently discovered, very heavy casualties inflicted on the enemy in the defence of the crest."

== Burial ==
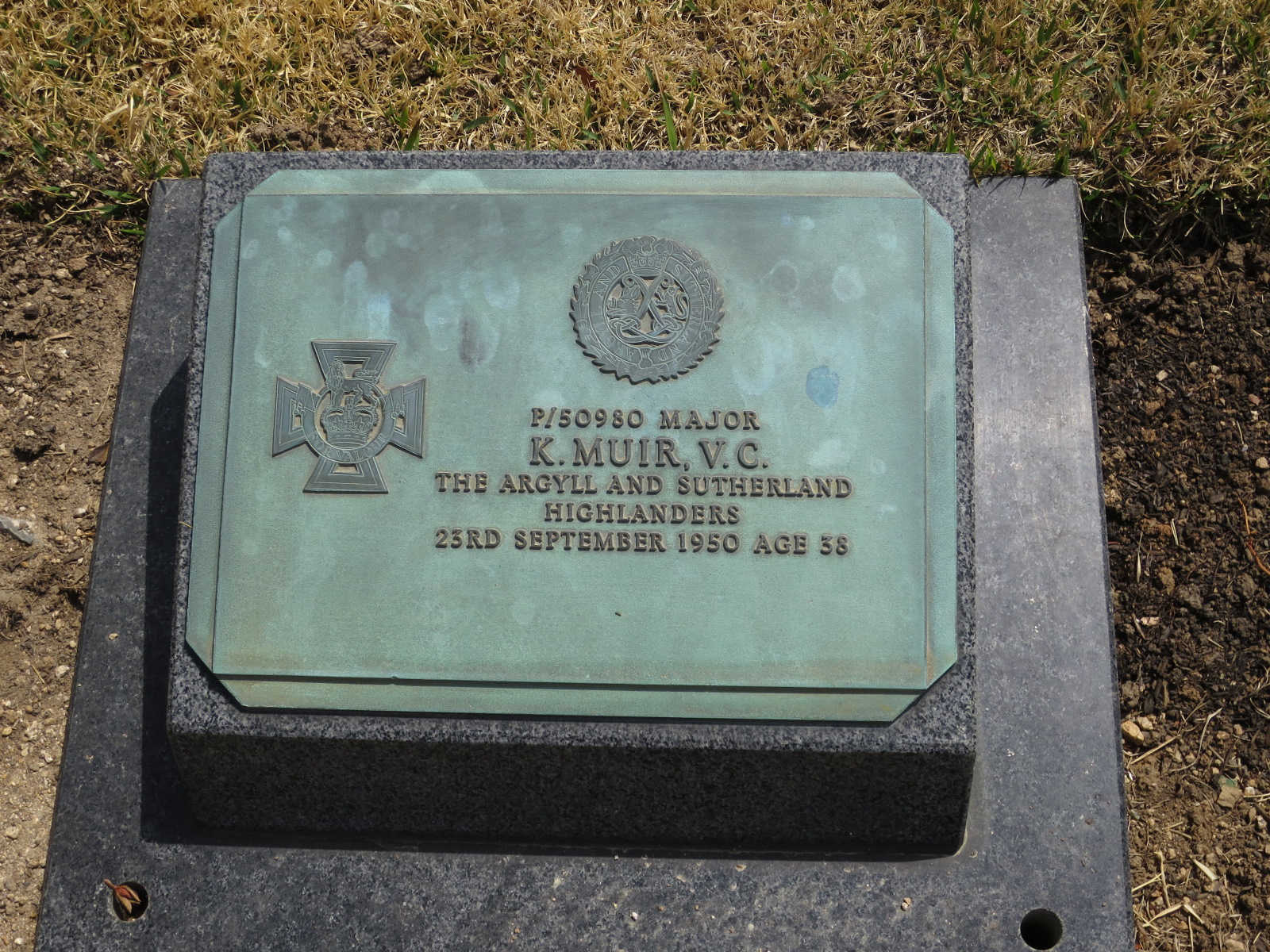
Muir's grave at the UN Memorial Cemetery

Initially buried in the Taegu Military Cemetery, his remains were exhumed and transferred to the United Nations Memorial Cemetery, Busan, Korea, on 14 May 1951. His name is also recorded on his father's headstone at St. Peter's Churchyard, Frimley, Surrey, England.

== Honours ==
Muir's parents received his Victoria Cross from King George VI on 14 February 1951.

He was awarded the following medals, which are displayed at the Argyll and Sutherland Highlanders Museum, Stirling Castle, Scotland.

Ribbon	Description	Notes
	Victoria Cross (VC)	1950
	India General Service Medal (1909)	With clasp
	India General Service Medal (1936)	With clasp
	1939-45 Star	
	Africa Star	
	Italy Star	
	France and Germany Star	
	Defence Medal	
	War Medal 1939–1945	With MID Emblem
	Korea Medal	
	United Nations Korea Medal	
	Distinguished Service Cross	US Award

The award of the American Distinguished Service Cross to Muir was, like his VC, a posthumous one.
