= Lance-corporal of horse =

Military rank in the British Army

Cloth insignia of a lance-corporal of horse

Lance corporal of horse (LCoH) is an appointment unique to the Household Cavalry of the British Army, equivalent to lance sergeant in the Foot Guards. It was introduced in 1971. On promotion to corporal, an NCO is automatically appointed lance-corporal of horse, so that the rank structure effectively goes straight from Lance Corporal to lance corporal of horse, and then to Corporal of Horse. However, lance corporals of horse are still addressed as "Corporal".

A lance-corporal of horse wears three rank chevrons surmounted by a cloth crown (as opposed to the metal crowns worn by full corporals of horse).

The rank was introduced to fall in line with lance sergeants in the Foot Guards allowing them to use the sergeants' mess.
