= Ralph D. Townsend =

United States Air Force general

Ralph D. Townsend was a brigadier general in the Idaho Air National Guard.

== Career ==
Townsend originally enlisted in the Idaho Army National Guard in 1956. In 1958, he enlisted in the United States Air Force. He was commissioned an officer the following year. Townsend then began radar interceptor training at James Connally Air Force Base in Waco, Texas.

Following his graduation from training, Townsend was assigned to the 445th Fighter-Interceptor Squadron at Wurtsmith Air Force Base in Oscoda Township, Michigan. He was awarded his pilot wings in 1964 and later that year joined the 325th Fighter-Interceptor Squadron at Truax Field Air National Guard Base in Madison, Wisconsin. During that time, he was deployed to serve a tour of duty in the Vietnam War. In 1966, he was assigned to the 317th Fighter-Interceptor Squadron at Joint Base Elmendorf-Richardson in Anchorage, Alaska. During this time, he was deployed to serve a second tour of duty in the Vietnam War. Following his return to the United States, he was stationed at Mountain Home Air Force Base in Elmore County, Idaho.

Townsend transferred to the Air Force Reserve Command in 1969 and to the Idaho Air National Guard in 1970. He held command of the 190th Tactical Reconnaissance Squadron at Gowen Field Air National Guard Base in Boise, Idaho, from 1977 until 1978, at which time he was named Deputy Commander for Operations of the 124th Tactical Reconnaissance Group. Townsend assumed command of the 124th Tactical Reconnaissance Group in 1985. In 1989, he was named Assistant Adjutant General for Air, Idaho National Guard. His retirement was effective as of January 2, 1998.

Awards he received include the Meritorious Service Medal with oak leaf cluster, the Air Medal with oak leaf cluster, the Air Force Commendation Medal with two oak leaf clusters, the Outstanding Unit Award with three oak leaf clusters, the Combat Readiness Medal with one silver and two bronze oak leaf clusters, the National Defense Service Medal, the Armed Forces Expeditionary Medal, the Vietnam Service Medal with three service stars, the Humanitarian Service Medal, the Air Force Overseas Short Tour Service Ribbon, the Air Force Longevity Service Award with one silver and one bronze oak leaf cluster, the Armed Forces Reserve Medal, the Small Arms Expert Marksmanship Ribbon with service star, the Air Force Training Ribbon with oak leaf cluster and the Vietnam Campaign Medal.

== Education ==
- Homedale High School – Homedale, Idaho
- University of the State of New York
- Air Command and Staff College
- United States Army War College
