= Gary L. Sayler =

Idaho's Adjutant General

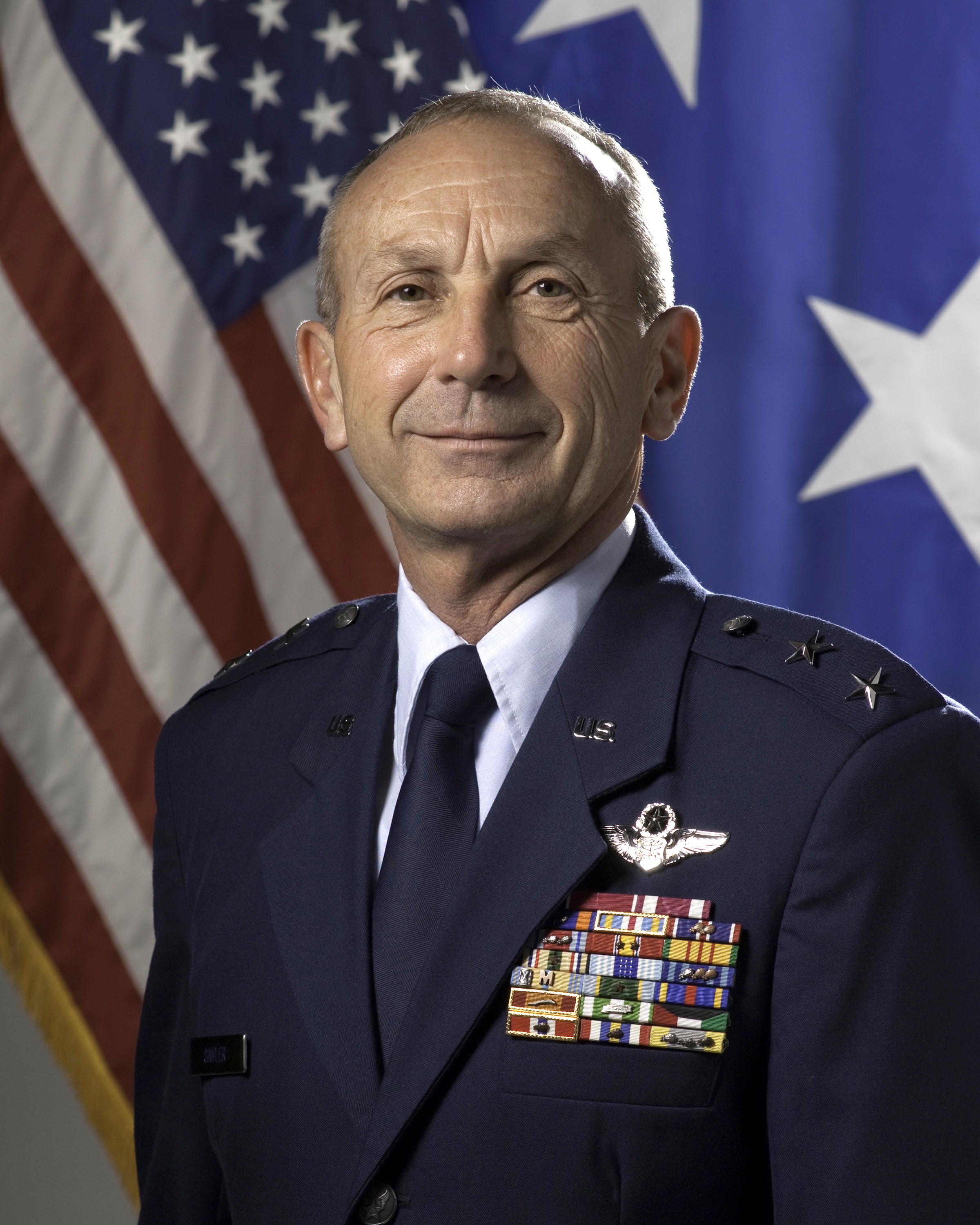
- Born: 1950 (age 75–76)
- Military career
- Allegiance: United States
- Branch: United States Air Force, Idaho National Guard

Gary L. Sayler (born 1950) served as Idaho's Adjutant General from January 2010 to November 2017.

== Education ==
Sayler attended North Dakota State University, graduating with a Bachelor of Science degree in 1971.

== Career ==
From 1995 to January 2004, he was the commander of the 124th Wing at Gowen Field in Boise, Idaho.

From January 2004 to January 2010, Sayler served as Commander of the Idaho Air National Guard's Joint Force headquarters at Gowen Field, Boise, Idaho.

He was appointed adjutant general in 2010. Governor Butch Otter requested an extension of Sayler's federal recognition as adjutant general in January 2017. Sayler continued to lead Idaho's National Guard through June 2017, which was the end of Idaho's fiscal year. He was succeeded by Michael J. Garshak in November 2017.
