= General Townsend =

General Townsend may refer to:

- Edward D. Townsend (1817–1893), Union Army brigadier general and brevet major general
- Franklin Townsend (1821–1898), Adjutant General of New York
- Frederick Townsend (1825–1897), Union Army brevet brigadier general
- Guy M. Townsend (1920–2011), U.S. Air Force brigadier general
- Ralph D. Townsend (fl. 1950s–1990s), Idaho Air National Guard brigadier general
- Stephen J. Townsend (born 1959), U.S. Army four-star general

== See also ==
- General Townshend (disambiguation)
