= 189 Squadron =

189 Squadron or 189th Squadron may refer to:

- No. 189 Squadron RAF, a unit of the United Kingdom Royal Air Force
- 189th Airlift Squadron (United States), a unit of the Idaho Air National Guard
