= Idaho Military Department =

Government agency in Idaho, US

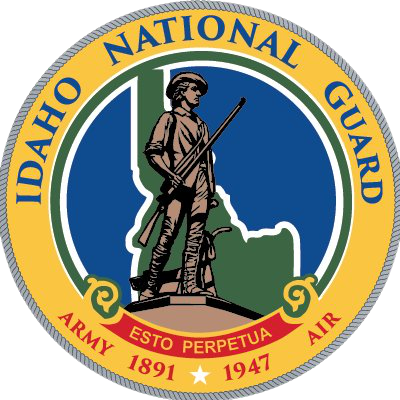

Agency overview
- Formed: 1891
- Jurisdiction: Government of Idaho
- Headquarters: Boise, Idaho, U.S.
- Employees: ≈ 4,300
- Child agencies: Idaho Army National Guard; Idaho Air National Guard; Office of Emergency Management; Idaho State Guard (defunct)

The Idaho Military Department consists of the Idaho Army National Guard, the Idaho Air National Guard, the Idaho Bureau of Homeland Security, and formerly the Idaho State Guard. Its headquarters are located in Boise. The main goal of the Idaho Military Department is to efficiently prepare emergency-ready staff to protect and serve the citizens of Idaho from any potential threats.

== History ==
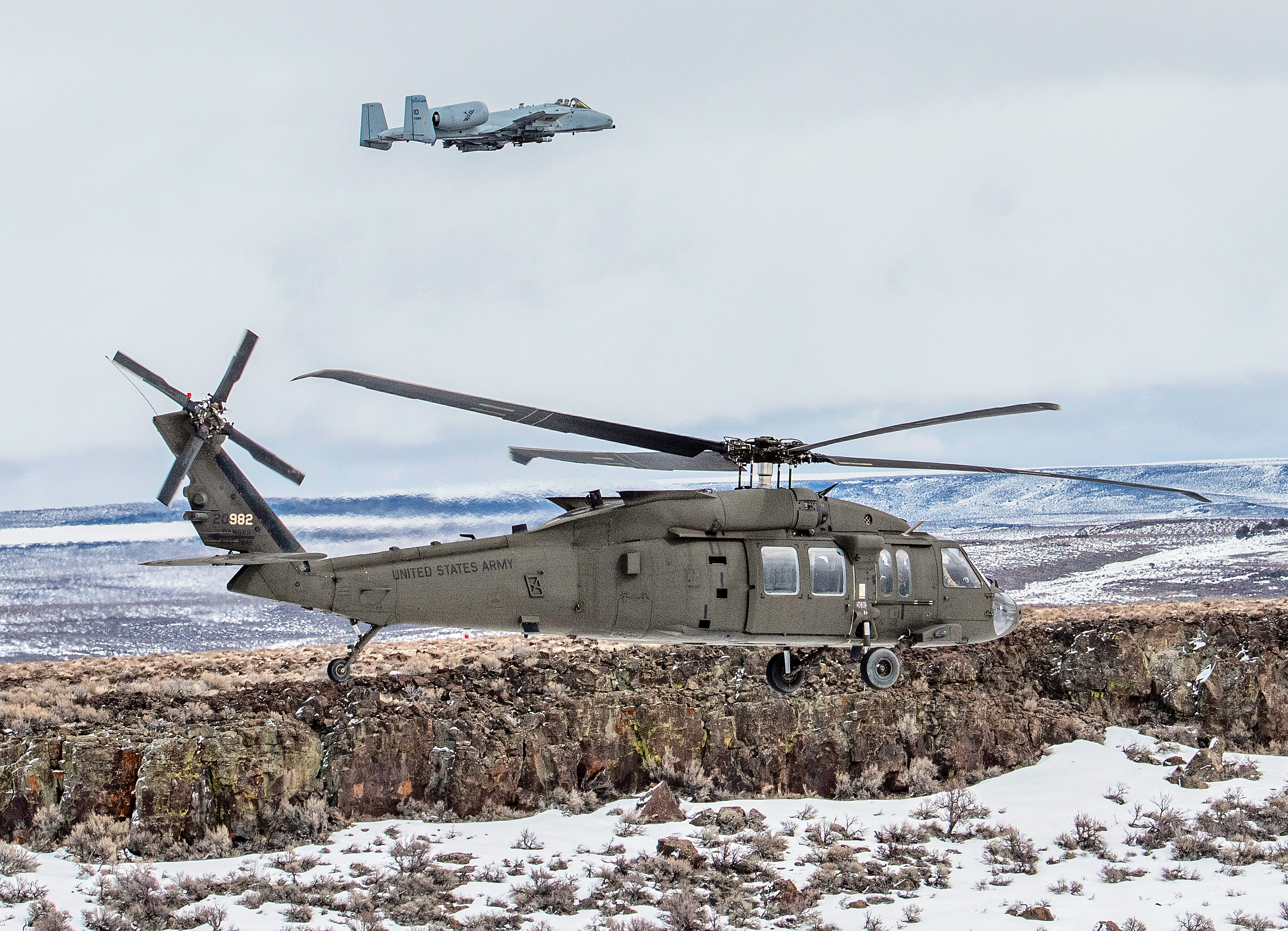
Idaho Army National Guard and Idaho Air National Guard aviation units conduct joint combat search and rescue and escort training throughout Idaho's Owyhee Mountains

The Idaho Military Department was founded in 1891 when the Idaho Legislature approved of its militia. The Idaho National Guard was in the Philippines during the Spanish–American War and was deployed in Mexico during the Pancho Villa Expedition. The Idaho National Guard also served in World War I, World War II, The Korean War and the Vietnam War. 116th Engineer Battalion is the only National Guard unit to be deployed in Korea and Vietnam.

Now, there are more than 4,300 soldiers/airmen that make up the national guard. The Idaho Air National Guard was officially created on September 18, 1947. The Idaho Army National Guard was established on May 7, 1898.

== Structure ==
=== Department of Homeland Security ===
The Department of Homeland Security is a department within the military that protects the United States and its civilians outside and in its borders. The main goal of homeland security is to prevent and protect against natural disasters and terrorism. There is a wide variety of jobs that fulfill the goals/needs of homeland security. Border patrol, cyber security, and emergency response are some jobs within the department. The Idaho Office of Emergency Management (IOEM) falls within the Homeland Security as well. IOEM’s mission is to have a thorough and effective plan when it comes to emergencies and natural disasters. IOEM’s operation plan lists out all the duties and responsibilities when responding to disasters. Their one main goal out of many is to have a prompt and well planned response, care, and search for victims injured by disaster.

=== Idaho Youth Challenge Program ===
The Idaho Youth Challenge Academy is a high school academy open to 16–18 year old Idaho resident high school dropouts. This program is used as a constructive learning environment to help teach life skills and self-discipline to at-risk youth.

== Idaho Air Force Bases ==
Idaho is home of two major Air Force bases; Gowen Field Air National Guard and Mountain Home Air Force Base.

Air Forces Bases of Idaho
Name	Location	Year Founded	Division
Gowen Field Air National Guard Base	Boise, ID	1946	124th Fighter Wing
Mountain Home Air Force Base	Mountain Home, ID	1943	366th Fighter Wing

=== Gowen Field Air National Guard ===
Gowen Field was established in 1946, on October 13 by Lieutenant Colonel Thomas George Lanphier Jr. The first unit among the Idaho Air Force Department became the 190th Fighter Squadron, which they were originally named. They started with no airfield, planes, or money, which they eventually moved to Gowen Field which used to be a United States Army Air Corps base in 1947. The squadron had acquired their first P-51D Mustang right before transferring to Gowen Field, which was then used for training. The first call to action for the 190th Fighter Squadron was in 1950 when they were to replace American Air Force units in the Korean War. The 124th Fighter Wing's A-10s had supported NATO forces in Kosovo in 1999, and again in Iraq in 2003 as part of Operation Iraqi Freedom.

The Idaho Air National Guard continues to serve state-wide as well as nation-wide. They provide assistance for security, as well as provide possibilities for civil engineering and logistics. They indulge in much critical training for their troops which includes air-traffic training, and dangerous ground-to-air preparation.

=== Mountain Home Air Force Base ===
The Mountain Home Air Force Base was first established around the United States' entry into World War II, but the division itself was not officially started until after the war ended. Construction began in November 1942, and was not officially opened to the public until August 7, 1943.

The Mountain Home Air Force Base consists of more than 4,800 military servicemen and servicewomen. The base consists of three different fighter squadrons; the 389th Fighter Squadron, the 391st Fighter Squadron, as well as a Republic of Singapore 428th Fighter Squadron. Today, the 366th Fighter Wing participates is ready to be called to action for suppressing hostile air defenses as well as allied transportation aircraft and ground soldiers.
