= Idaho State Guard =

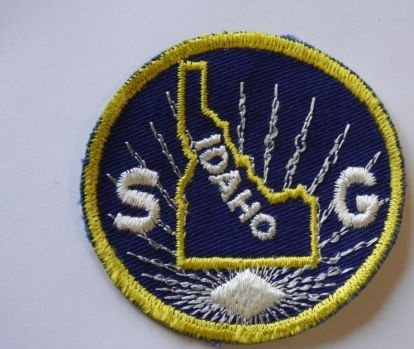
- Idaho State Guard insignia.
- Active: 1917–1946
- Country: United States
- Allegiance: Idaho
- Branch: Army National Guard
- Type: State defense force
- Role: Auxiliaries
- Size: 8,502 (approximately)
- Garrison/HQ: Boise, ID
- Motto: Pro Deo Domo Patria
- Colors: Blue and Gold

Commanders
- State Military Leadership: Major General Mervin Gilbert McConnel; Adjutant General of Idaho during World War II Idaho Governor Chase A. Clark; Commander and Chief of the Idaho State Guard during World War II

The Idaho State Guard, formerly known as the Idaho Home Guard, or The Idaho Volunteer Reserve (IVR) is the inactive state defense force of Idaho. The Idaho State Guard was created to replace the Idaho National Guard as a stateside homeland security force while the National Guard was in federal service. Their mission was to provide emergency services, including search and rescue missions and guard vital state infrastructure.

== World War I ==
During World War I, the governor Moses Alexander ordered formation of four companies of Home Guard, with 100 men per company, paid for by the state.

== World War II ==
The Idaho Volunteer Reserve also known as the Idaho State Guard was formed 4 months after Japan's attack on Pearl Harbor. The IVR was formed by Governor Chase Clark in April 1942. The ADA County battalion was commanded by Col. Ralph Breshears. By July, Col Breshears reported the Ada Co. IVR strength was 1085 enlisted and 85 officers in 29 companies and by Dec. the Ada Co. IVR had 30 companies and the Canyon Co. IVR had 14 companies. At its peak, the IVR had 8,502 men in 165 companies throughout Idaho. Members of the Volunteer Reserve furnished their own weapons, ammunition and equipment, they wore unit insignia and carried certificates of enrollment. By April 1944, the threat of invasion of Idaho became virtually nonexistent and officials took steps to muster out all units of the Idaho Volunteer Reserve. The State Guard of World War II was armed with Enfield rifles. In September 1942, the Idaho State Guard became the first state military organization in the United States to induct women into its command structure when Governor Chase A. Clark administered the oath of enlistment to a group of women from the Idaho volunteer auxiliary reserves. As of August 1946, after the war's conclusion, the Idaho State Guard remained in active service and was subject to call-up.

== Legal Status ==
The legal authority of each state to maintain its own state defense force is recognized by the federal government of the United States under Title 32, Section 109 of the United States Code. Under Idaho law, the Governor of Idaho has the legal authority to activate the state defense force.

== See also ==
- Idaho Wing Civil Air Patrol
- United States Coast Guard Auxiliary
- State Guard Association of the United States
- Idaho National Guard
