= Bisterne =

Village in Hampshire, England

Coordinates: 50.8116°N 1.7905°W

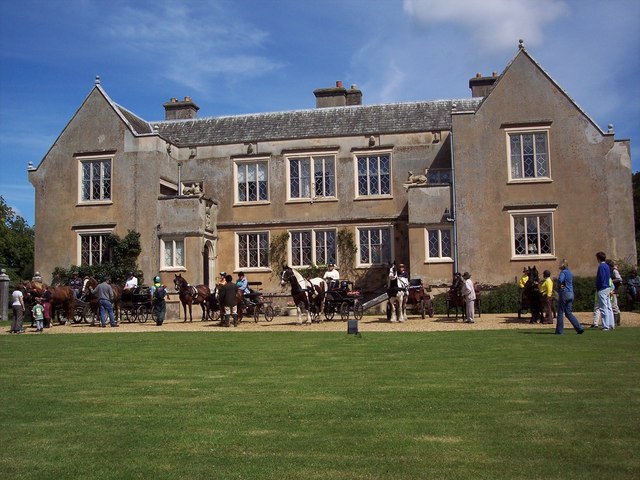
- Bisterne Manor

- Location within Hampshire
- OS grid reference: SU148013
- District: New Forest
- Shire county: Hampshire
- Region: South East
- Country: England
- Sovereign state: United Kingdom
- Post town: RINGWOOD
- Postcode district: BH24
- Dialling code: 01590
- Police: Hampshire and Isle of Wight
- Fire: Hampshire and Isle of Wight
- Ambulance: South Central
- UK Parliament: New Forest West

Bisterne is a hamlet in the civil parish of Ringwood in the New Forest National Park in Hampshire, England. Its nearest town is Ringwood, which lies 3 miles (4.8 km) to the north.

== History ==
Bisterne is listed in the Domesday Book of 1086 as Betestre. It was possessed by the sons of Godric Malf in 1086, who had himself possessed it prior to 1066. The place was known as Bettesthorne in the 13th century, and gave its name to its early lords, the Bettesthorne family, who also owned lands in Minstead. In the 15th century it passed by inheritance to the Berkeley family, and in the 16th century to the Compton family. In 1792, John Compton sold the manor to William Mills and the manor house subsequently remained in the Mills family.

The church of Saint Paul, Bisterne, was built in 1842 of brick with stone dressings to a design by George Evans. It consists of a nave of five bays, aisles, north porch and tower with spire containing one bell.

A schoolhouse built in 1840 survives in the hamlet.

=== RAF Bisterne ===
RAF Bisterne was opened in March 1944, as a prototype for the type of temporary Advanced Landing Ground type airfield which would be built in France after D-Day. It was situated to the east of the B3347 road between Bisterne and Kingston, It was used by the United States Army Air Forces as a fighter airfield. It was closed in the late summer of 1944. Today the site is covered by fields.

== The Bisterne Dragon ==
Bisterne is notable in English folklore for being the supposed location of a dragon-slaying. The local tradition is that a dragon had his den at Burley Beacon, about 3 miles (4.8 km) east of Bisterne, at Burley. There are several versions of the tale, one being that the creature "flew" every morning to Bisterne, where it would be supplied with milk. In order to kill the dragon, a valiant knight (usually named Berkeley) built a hide, and with two dogs lay in wait. The creature came as usual one morning for its milk, and when the hut door was opened the dogs attacked it, and while thus engaged the knight took the dragon by surprise, the dogs dying in the affray. The fight raged throughout the forest, with the dragon finally dying outside Lyndhurst, its corpse turning into a great hill (now known as Boltons Bench). Though the knight had defeated the dragon he had been mentally broken by the battle, and after thirty days and thirty nights he went back to Boltons Bench to die alone atop it, his body turning into the yew tree which can still be seen today.
