= 189th Airlift Squadron =

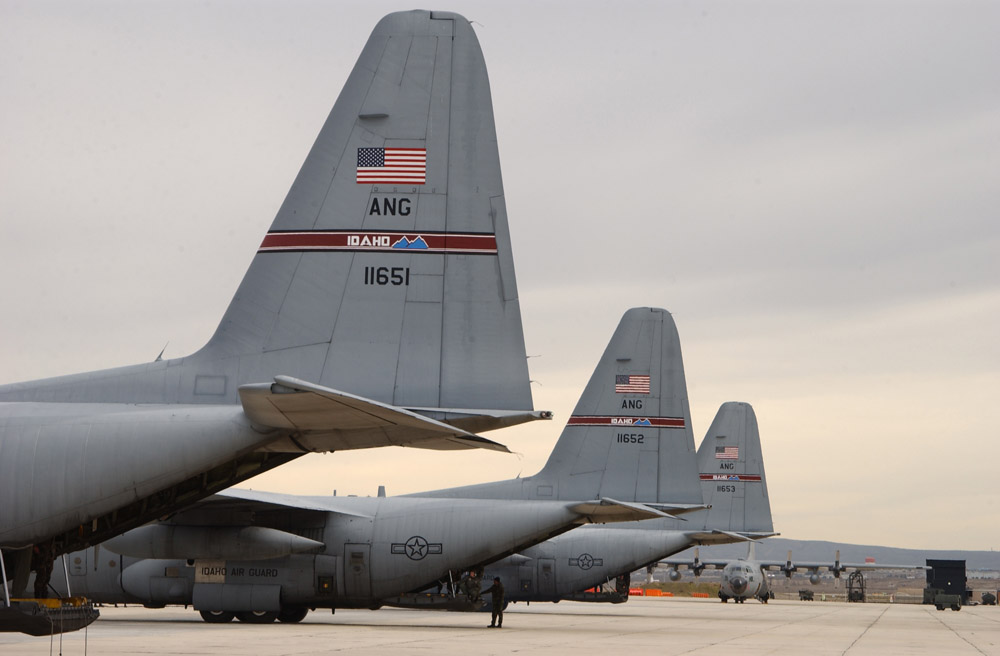
- C-130s parked on the ramp at Gowen Field, Idaho
- Active: 1984–2009
- Country: United States
- Branch: Air National Guard
- Type: Squadron
- Role: Airlift

Insignia
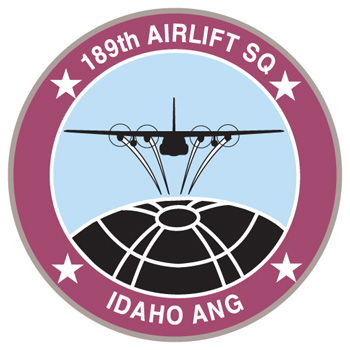
- 189th Airlift Squadron emblem

The 189th Airlift Squadron is an inactive unit of the Air National Guard. It was last assigned to the 124th Wing located at Gowen Field Air National Guard Base, Idaho. Following the Base Realignment and Closure, 2005 the unit was inactivated on 18 October 2009.

== History ==
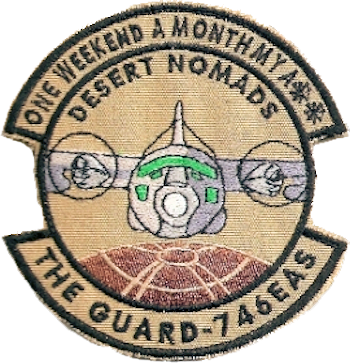
Emblem used during the 189th Airlift Squadron's deployments to Iraq during Operation Iraqi Freedom as the 746th EAS

The 189th was redesignated on 1 September 1996 at Gowen Field ANGB as part of the 124th Wing. It was a tactical airlift squadron, equipped with Lockheed C-130E Hercules transports.

Prior to its redeisgnation as a squadron in 1995, the unit was initially formed on 1 April 1984 as the 189th Tactical Reconnaissance Training Flight. Its mission was a Formal Training Unit (FTU) for aircrews being assigned to the 124th Tactical Reconnaissance (later Fighter) Group flying RF-4C Phantom II reconnaissance and later F-4G Phantom II electronic warfare aircraft. On 16 March 1992 it was re-designated as the 189th Fighter Flight. The flight used 190th Tactical Reconnaissance Squadron aircraft for its training mission.

With the retirement of the F-4Gs in 1995, the status of the unit was changed from a flight to a squadron, and it received C-130E aircraft for operational missions. The 189th supported countless deployments all over the world in support of the U.S. Southern Command, Operation Allied Force, Operation Southern Watch, Operation Enduring Freedom and Operation Iraqi Freedom. They also responded to winter weather disasters New Mexico and provided humanitarian support for Hurricanes Katrina and Rita.

The Airlift Squadron's awards include the Governor's Outstanding Unit Citation 1997, 1999, and 2005 as well as the Adjutant General Award 1998.

The 189th Airlift Squadron was inactivated as a result of the 2005 Base Realignment and Closure Act on 18 October 2009. Many of the members who were part of the squadron were absorbed within the wing.

== Lineage ==
- Constituted as the 189th Tactical Reconnaissance Training Flight and allotted to the Air National Guard

Activated on 1 September 1984
Redesignated 189th Fighter Flight on 16 March 1992
Redesignated 189th Fighter Squadron in 1995
Redesignated 189th Airlift Squadron in May 1996
Inactivated and withdrawn from the Air National Guard on 18 October 2009

=== Assignments ===
- 124th Tactical Reconnaissance Group (later 124th Fighter Group), 1 September 1984
- 124 Operations Group, October 1992 – 18 October 2009

=== Stations ===
- Gowen Field (later Gowen Field Air National Guard Base), 1 September 1984 – 18 October 2009

=== Aircraft ===
- McDonnell RF-4 Phantom II, 1984–1995
- McDonnell F-4 Phantom II, unknown–1995
- Lockheed C-130 Hercules, 1995–2009
