= General Townshend =

General Townshend may refer to:

- Charles Townshend (British Army officer) (1861–1924), British Army major general
- George Townshend, 1st Marquess Townshend (1724–1807), British Army general
- Henry Dive Townshend (1795–1882), British Army lieutenant general

== See also ==
- General Townsend (disambiguation)
