= Idaho Air National Guard =

- Active: May 24, 1946 – present
- Country: United States
- Allegiance: Idaho
- Branch: Air National Guard
- Type: State militia, military reserve force
- Role: "To meet state and federal mission responsibilities."
- Part of: Idaho National Guard; United States National Guard Bureau; National Guard
- Garrison/HQ: Joint Force Headquarters, 3882 W. Ellsworth Street, Bldg 440, Boise, Idaho, 83705

Commanders
- Civilian leadership: President Donald Trump (Commander-in-Chief); Troy Meink (Secretary of the Air Force); Governor Brad Little (Governor of the State of Idaho)
- State military leadership: Brigadier General Michael A. Nolan

Aircraft flown
- Attack: A-10 Thunderbolt II

The Idaho Air National Guard (ID ANG) is the aerial militia of the State of Idaho, United States of America. It is a reserve of the United States Air Force and along with the Idaho Army National Guard, an element of the Idaho National Guard.

As state militia units, the units in the Idaho Air National Guard are not in the normal United States Air Force chain of command. They are under the jurisdiction of the governor of Idaho though the office of the Idaho Adjutant General unless they are federalized by order of the president of the United States. The Idaho Air National Guard is headquartered in Boise, and its commander is currently Brigadier General Timothy J. Donnellan.

== Overview ==
Under the "Total Force" concept, Idaho Air National Guard units are considered to be Air Reserve Components (ARC) of the United States Air Force (USAF). Idaho ANG units are trained and equipped by the Air Force and are operationally awarded to major command of the USAF if federalized. In addition, the Idaho Air National Guard forces are assigned to Air Expeditionary Forces and are subject to deployment tasking orders along with their active duty and Air Force Reserve counterparts in their assigned cycle deployment window.

Along with their federal reserve obligations, as state militia units, the elements of the Idaho ANG are subject to being activated by order of the governor to provide protection of life and property, and preserve peace, order and public safety. State missions include disaster relief in times of earthquakes, hurricanes, floods and forest fires, search and rescue, protection of vital public services, and support to civil defense.

== Components ==
The Idaho Air National Guard consists of the following major unit:

- 124th Fighter Wing

Established 13 October 1946 (as: 190th Fighter Squadron); operates: A-10 Thunderbolt II
Stationed at: Gowen Field Air National Guard Base, Boise
Gained by: Air Combat Command
The wing's mission is to maintain highly trained, well-equipped, and motivated military forces in order to provide combat-ready A/OA-10 aircraft and support elements in response to wartime and peacetime tasking under state or federal authority.

Support Unit Functions and Capabilities:

- 124th Air Support Operations Squadron

Mission is to provide forward air controllers in support of front line Army maneuver units to coordinate and control close air support missions of the Air Force and joint forces in support of the ground battle.

- 266th Range Squadron

The mission of the 266th Range Squadron is to provide tactical aircrews from both the active duty Air Force - from the 366th Air Expeditionary Wing, Mountain Home Air Force Base, Idaho - and the Idaho Air National Guard - from the 124th Wing, Gowen Field, with the most realistic electronic combat training threat environment available.

== History ==
On 24 May 1946, the United States Army Air Forces, in response to dramatic postwar military budget cuts imposed by President Harry S. Truman, allocated inactive unit designations to the National Guard Bureau for the formation of an Air Force National Guard. These unit designations were allotted and transferred to various State National Guard bureaus to provide them unit designations to re-establish them as Air National Guard units.

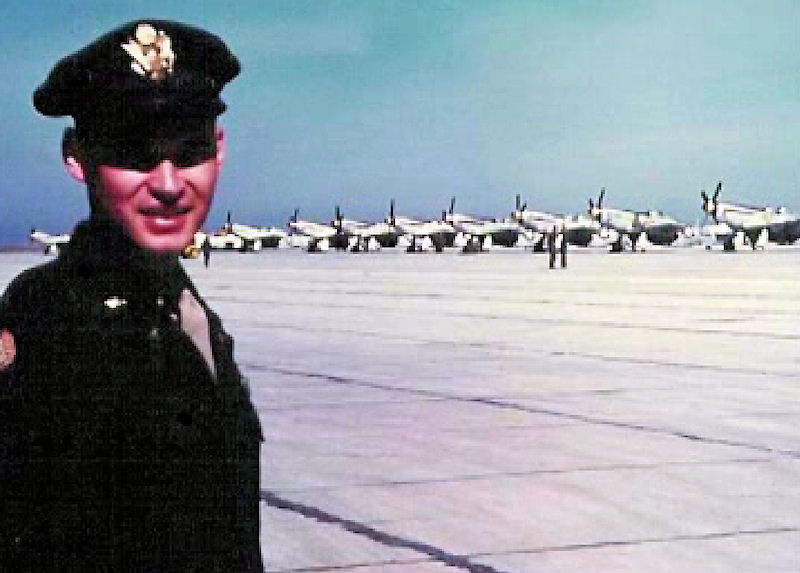
F-51D Mustangs of the 190th Fighter Squadron at Gowen Field, Boise, 1947

The Idaho Air National Guard was formed in large part by Lieutenant Colonel Thomas Lanphier. Serving in the Pacific Theater Fifth Air Force during World War II, he was one of the P-38 Lightning pilots credited with shooting down Japanese Admiral Isoroku Yamamoto on 18 April 1943. He stood up the 190th Fighter Squadron receiving federal recognition on 13 October 1946. Most of Idaho's early airmen were also World War II veterans. The 190th was formed with 23 officers and 44 enlisted airmen at a small building in downtown Boise. They had nothing, no buildings, no money or equipment. Receiving F-51D Mustangs, the squadron moved to Gowen Field in 1947 and has been there ever since.

18 September 1947, however, is considered the Idaho Air National Guard's official birth concurrent with the establishment of the United States Air Force as a separate branch of the United States military under the National Security Act. The initial mission of the Idaho ANG was the air defense of the state. On 1 July 1955 the 190th Fighter-Interceptor Squadron was authorized to expand to a group level, and the 124th Fighter Group (Air Defense) was allotted by the National Guard Bureau, extended federal recognition and activated.

Today, the Idaho ANG performs a worldwide ground-air support mission, along with a forward air controller training mission and support for active-duty USAF training missions.

After the September 11 attacks, elements of every Air National Guard unit in Idaho has been activated in support of the global war on terrorism. Flight crews, aircraft maintenance personnel, communications technicians, air controllers and air security personnel were engaged in Operation Noble Eagle air defense overflights of major United States cities. Also, Idaho ANG units have been deployed overseas as part of Operation Enduring Freedom in Afghanistan and Operation Iraqi Freedom in Iraq, as well as other locations as directed.

=== Invasion of Iraq friendly fire incident ===
As part of the invasion of Iraq and supporting the British portion of that operation called Operation Telic, on March 28, 2003, two 124th Wing A-10 Thunderbolt II aircraft from the 190th Fighter Squadron flew a mission to destroy artillery and rocket launchers from Iraq's 6th Armor Division, dug in 25 miles (40 km) north of Basra. During the mission, the two A-10 aircraft mistakenly attacked a patrol of four armored vehicles from D Squadron of the British Blues and Royals of the Household Cavalry that were supporting the 16 Air Assault Brigade in Operation Telic. As a result of the attack by the 190th A-10 aircraft, British Lance-Corporal of Horse Matty Hull was killed and five of his colleagues were injured, four seriously.

== See also ==
- Idaho Wing Civil Air Patrol
