= Idaho Wing Civil Air Patrol =

Highest echelon of the Civil Air Patrol in Idaho, United States

- Idaho Wing of Civil Air Patrol

Associated branches
- United States Air Force

Command staff
- Commander: Col Kirk Dehn
- Deputy Commander: Lt Col Kambiz Kamiab

Current statistics
- Cadets: 350
- Seniors: 302
- Total Membership: 652
- Website: idwg.cap.gov
- Statistics as of April 2024

The Civil Air Patrol's Idaho Wing (Abbreviated IDWG) is the highest echelon of Civil Air Patrol in the state of Idaho. Idaho Wing headquarters are located in Blackfoot, Idaho. Idaho Wing oversees 9 squadrons and over 600 cadets and senior members across the state of Idaho.

== Mission ==
Civil Air Patrol has three missions: providing emergency services; offering cadet programs for youth; and providing aerospace education for both CAP members and the general public.

=== Emergency Services ===
Civil Air Patrol provides emergency services, including search and rescue missions, disaster relief operations, humanitarian services, Air Force support missions, and counter-drug operations.

In March 2020, volunteers from the Idaho Wing were activated to support the Kootenai County Emergency Operations Center during the COVID-19 pandemic. Members performed administrative functions in support of the county, including helping the operations center obtain FEMA reimbursements.

In 2023, IDWG was activated to search for two missing persons in Kootenai County.

=== Cadet Programs ===
Civil Air Patrol provides a cadet program for youth aged 12 to 21. Cadets train through the 16-step program in skills including aerospace education, leadership training, physical fitness, and moral leadership.

=== Aerospace Education ===
Civil Air Patrol provides both internal training for CAP members, and external training for the general public. Internal training is directed at both senior members and cadets. External training through the public is provided through the nation's educational system through workshops provided to students.

== Command Staff and Chain of Command ==
The Current Commander of Idaho Wing is Colonel Kirk Dehn, the Vice Commander is Lieutenant Colonel Kambiz Kamiab and the Command Non-Commissioned Officer (NCO) is Senior Master Sergeant (SMSgt) Gerald Martin. They were preceded by Colonel Robin Vest who served as Commander of Idaho Wing from 2021 to 2024.

== Organization ==
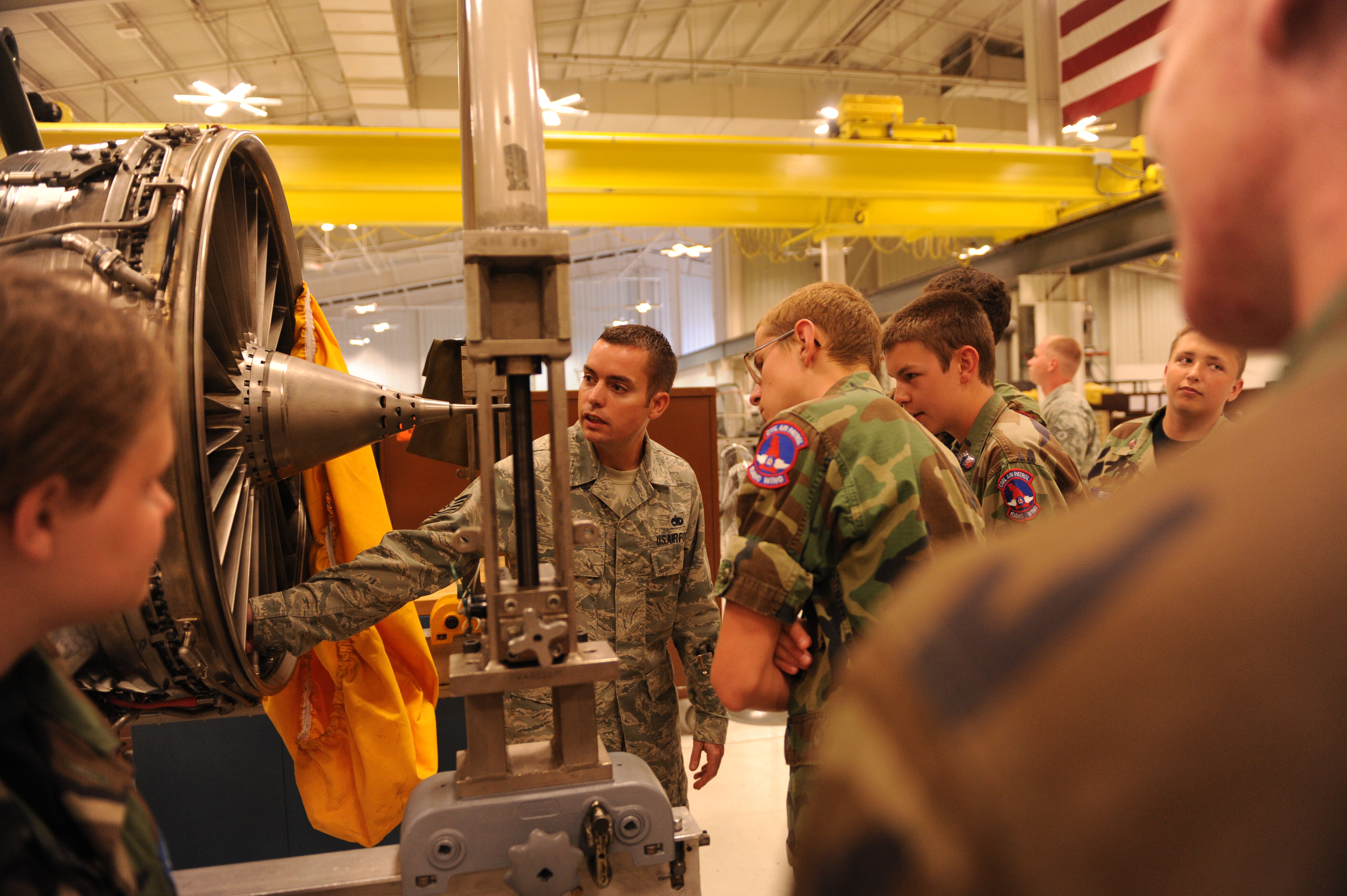
Idaho Wing Civil Air Patrol students enjoy a base tour at Mountain Home Air Force Base, Idaho.

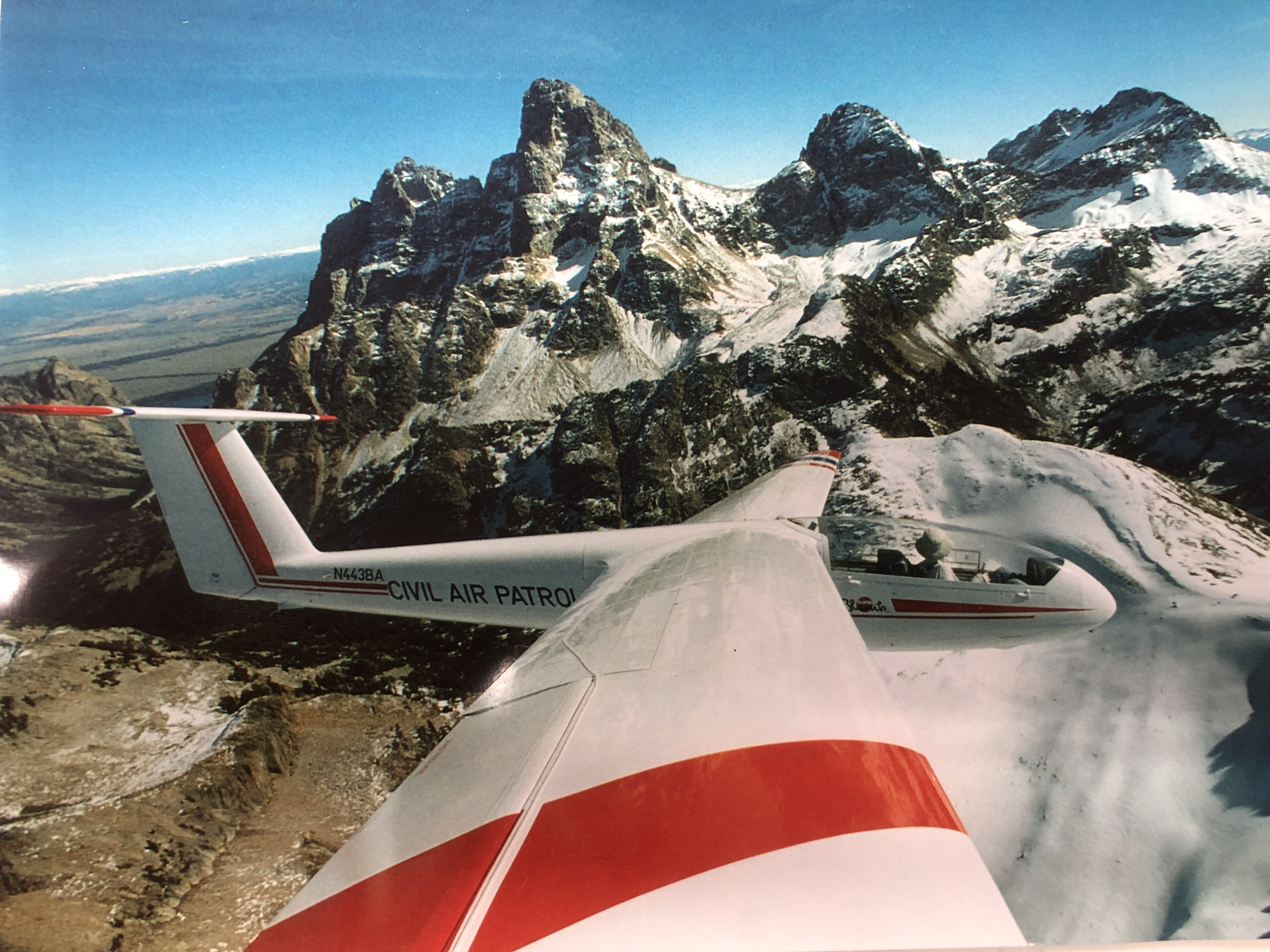
An Idaho Wing Civil Air Patrol glider soars above Driggs, Idaho.

Squadrons of the Idaho Wing
Designation	Squadron Name	Location	Squadron Commander	Notes
ID-001	Idaho Wing Headquarters	Blackfoot	Col. Kirk Dehn	
ID-097	Eagle Rock Composite Squadron	Idaho Falls	Maj Paul Young	
ID-096	Pocatello Composite Squadron	Pocatello	1st Lt Mike Smith	
ID-069	Joe Engle Composite Squadron	Burley	1st Lt Kevin Neal	
ID-049	Twin Falls Composite Squadron	Twin Falls	Capt. Kirk Gustafson	
ID-073	Boise Composite Squadron	Boise	Capt Stephanie Payton	
ID-015	Nampa Composite Squadron	Nampa	1st Lt Cory Edwards	
ID-083	Coeur d’Alene Composite Squadron	Hayden	Lt. Col. Eugene Gussenhoven	
ID-098	Selkirk Composite Squadron	Bonners Ferry	Capt Damen Therkildsen	
ID-099	Mountain Home Composite Squadron	Mountain Home	Lt. Col. Ted Thompson	
ID-999	Idaho Legislative Squadron	Boise	Col. Warren Vest	

== See also ==
- Awards and decorations of Civil Air Patrol
- Idaho Air National Guard
