= 124th Fighter Wing =

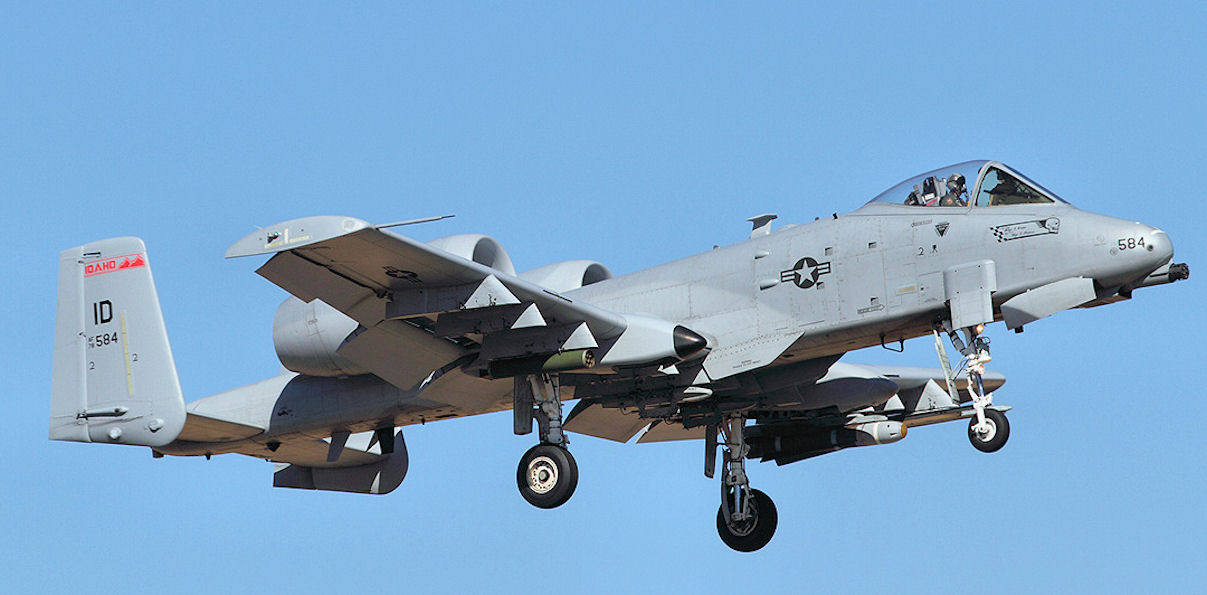
- 190th Fighter Squadron A-10 Thunderbolt II, AF Ser. No. 78-0584
- Active: 1956–present
- Country: United States
- Allegiance: Idaho
- Branch: Air National Guard
- Type: Wing
- Role: Ground support
- Part of: Idaho Air National Guard
- Garrison/HQ: Gowen Field ANGB, Boise, Idaho, U.S.

Insignia
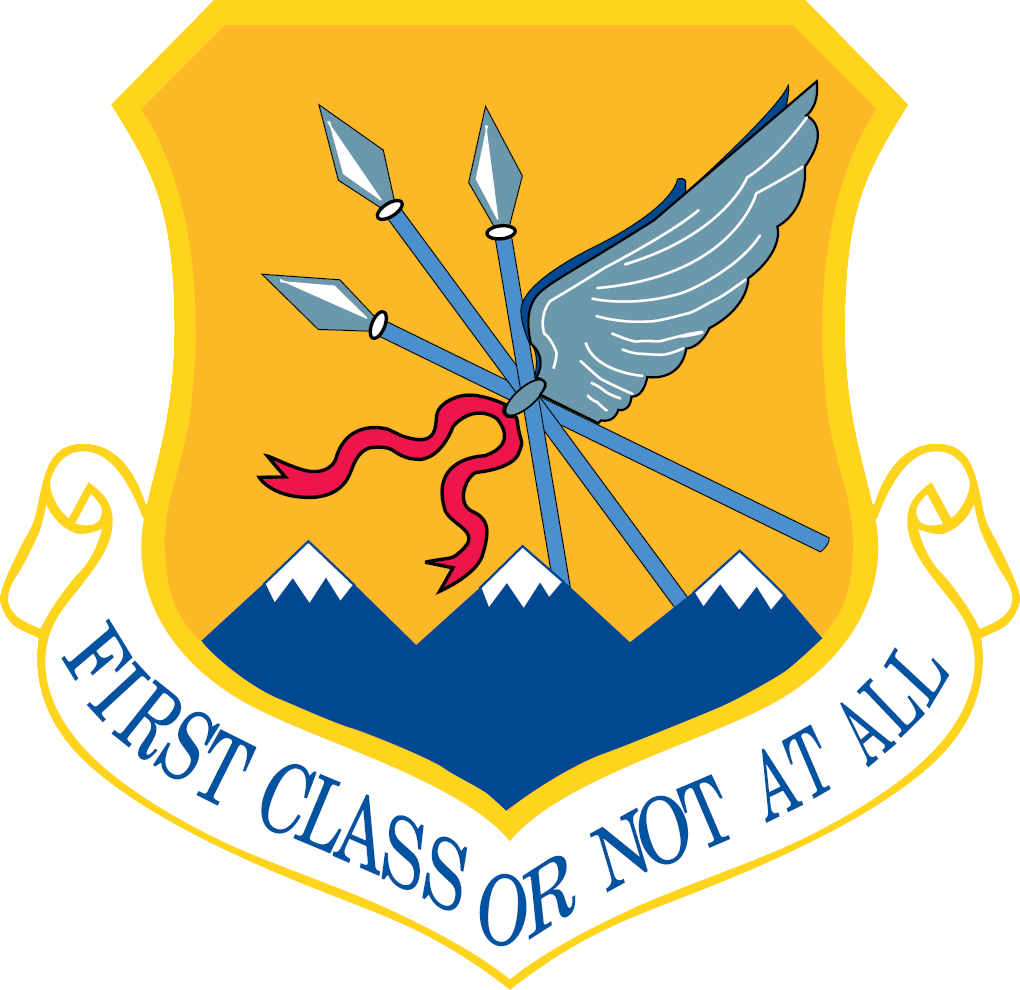
- 124th Fighter Wing
- Tail stripe: Red "Idaho"
- Tail code: ID

The 124th Fighter Wing is a unit of the Idaho Air National Guard, stationed at Gowen Field Air National Guard Base in Boise, Idaho, United States. It operates the Fairchild Republic A-10 Thunderbolt II aircraft conducting close air support missions. If activated to federal service, the wing is gained by Air Combat Command (ACC) of the U.S. Air Force.

== Mission ==
The federal mission of the 124th Fighter Wing under Title 10 United States Code is to properly equip and train personnel in a high state of readiness for immediate tasking as levied by higher headquarters as part of the Air Reserve Component (ARC) of the U.S. Air Force. Its state mission under Title 32 United States Code is to, at the call of the Governor of the State of Idaho, provide personnel and equipment to assist civil authorities prior to, during and after emergencies or disasters; to protect life, property, preserve peace, order and public safety.

== Units ==
The 124th Fighter Wing consists of the following units:

- 124th Operations Group
- 190th Fighter Squadron
- 124th Maintenance Group
- 124th Mission Support Group
- 124th Medical Group
- 266th Range Squadron

== History ==
=== Air Defense ===
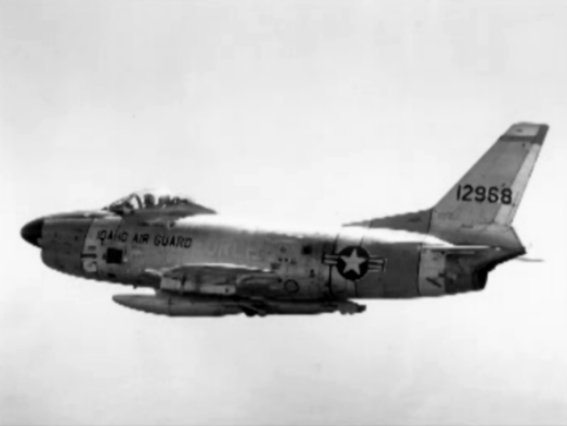
190th FIS F-86L Sabre Interceptor 51-2968. Today, this aircraft is on display at McClellan Air Force Base, California.

On 14 April 1956, the Idaho Air National Guard 190th Fighter-Interceptor Squadron was authorized to expand to a group level, and the 124th Fighter Group (Air Defense) was established by the National Guard Bureau. The 190th FIS becoming the group's flying squadron. Other squadrons assigned into the group were the 124th Headquarters, 124th Material Squadron (Maintenance), 124th Combat Support Squadron, and the 124th USAF Dispensary. Also in 1955, the F-86A day interceptors were replaced by the F-94A Starfire all-weather interceptor. The 190th changed aircraft four more times over the next 23 years to fly the F-89C Scorpion, F-86L Sabre Interceptor and the F-102 Delta Dagger.

In 1958, the 124th implemented the ADC Runway Alert Program, in which interceptors of the 190th FIS were committed to a five-minute runway alert, a task that would last until 1974. In 1968 Air Defense Command was re-designated as Aerospace Defense Command (ADCOM).

=== Tactical Reconnaissance ===
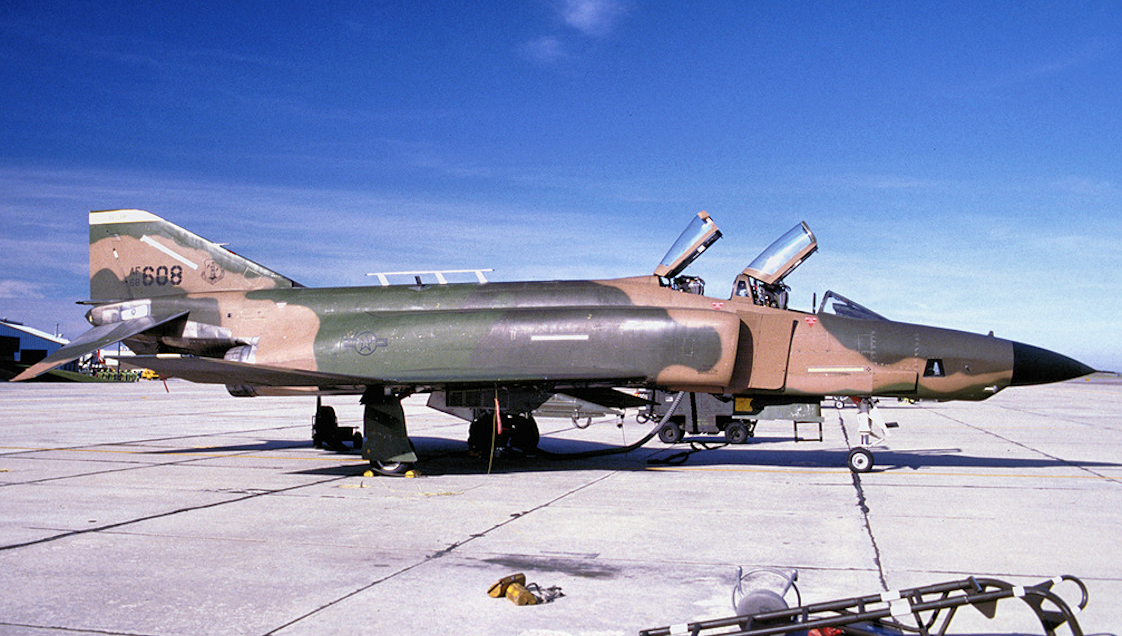
190th TRS RF-4C Phantom II 68-0608 about 1988. The 190th did not carry tail codes on its RF-4C aircraft.

In November 1975, the 124th Fighter-Interceptor Group was transferred from Air Defense Command to Tactical Air Command (TAC). It was re-equipped by TAC with the RF-4C Phantom II Mach 2 high speed reconnaissance aircraft. Many of these planes were veterans of combat in Vietnam. F-4 Phantom jets would eventually spend 20 years on Gowen Field, longer than any other aircraft in the history of Idaho's Air National Guard.

The unarmed RF-4C carried high resolution cameras and electronic sensors, which soon proved their worth to thousands of people in Idaho. RF-4C jets tracked flood waters pouring from the ruptured Teton Dam within hours of the dam's collapse in 1976 to show officials where flood waters were headed in time to warn people living in endangered areas. Aerial photographs were also taken immediately after the 1983 Borah Peak earthquake near Challis. The Challis-Mackay region experienced rather thorough damage, with 11 commercial buildings and 39 homes with major damage; while another 200 houses were damaged, minor to moderate. The reconnaissance photos helped emergency response crews locate and evaluate the damage.

The RF-4C was still in service at the time of the 1991 Gulf War, Operation Desert Storm, although the 190th TRS did not deploy any aircraft to the Middle East. Following the end of Desert Storm, all of the remaining RF-4Cs were withdrawn from USAF service.

=== Electronic Warfare ===
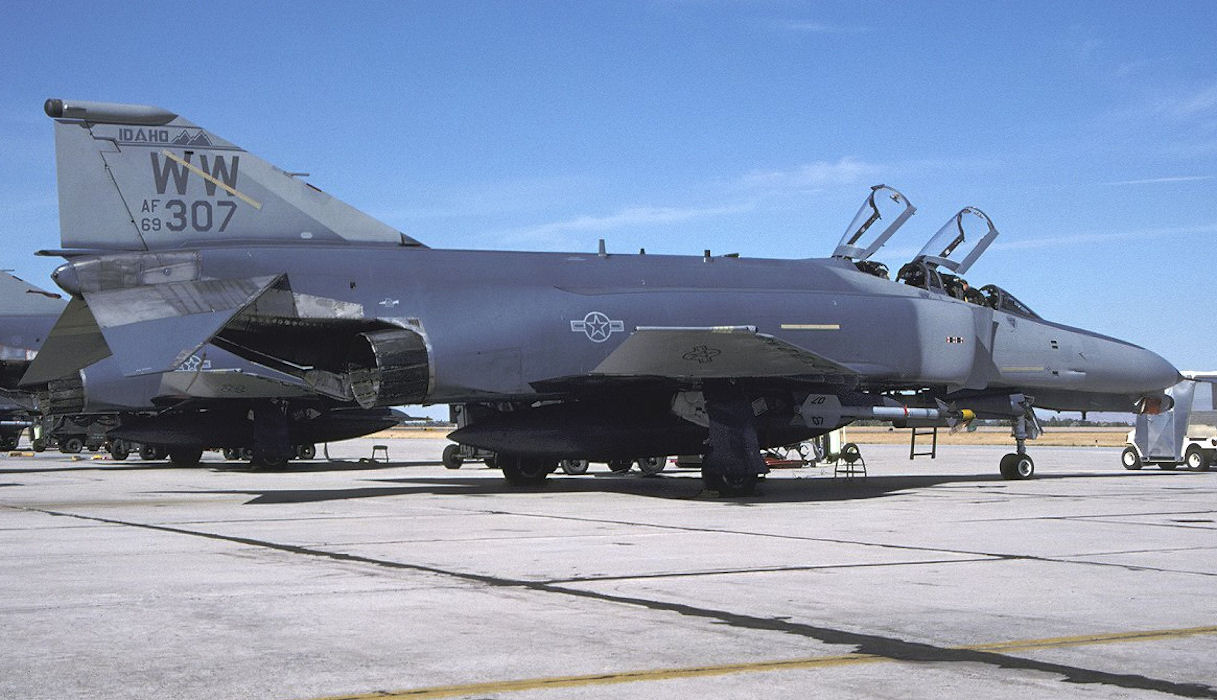
190th FS F-4G "Wild Weasel" 69-307

In 1991, Idaho's Air Guard changed aircraft and mission again, and began its conversion from the RF-4C to the F‑4G Phantom II "Wild Weasel" Electronic Warfare aircraft in June 1991. The Idaho ANG was to be the only ANG unit to operate the F-4G.

The F-4G was designed as an anti-Surface to Air Missile aircraft to jam and attack enemy radars when they were activated. "Wild Weasel" tactics and techniques were first developed in 1965 during the Vietnam War, and were later integrated into the Suppression of Enemy Air Defenses (SEAD) a plan used by US air forces to establish immediate air control, prior to possible full-scale conflict.

The F-4Gs were received from the 37th Tactical Fighter Wing at George AFB, California as part of the closure of George AFB. The squadron was re-designated as the 190th Fighter Squadron with the changeover of its parent 124th to the Air Force Objective Wing organization. In 1992, the 124th Fighter Group became part of the new Air Combat Command.

In April 1993 the squadron's Wild Weasel jets were sent to Southwest Asia to support Operation Southern Watch, enforcing the no‑fly zone over southern Iraq. Twice 190th airmen were challenged by illegal Iraqi air defense radar near Basra. The threats were answered – and silenced – with AGM-88 High-Speed Anti-Radiation Missile (HARM) anti-radiation missiles. Less than six months after ending its first Southwest Asia tour, the squadron began a second Southern Watch deployment, followed by two back‑to‑back tours in support of Operation Provide Comfort, enforcing the northern no‑fly zone and protecting Kurds from Iraqi aggression. From 1993 to 1995 there were a total of four deployments to the Gulf. The last such deployment returned to Boise in December 1995. Idaho's airmen served longer in Southwest Asia than any other flying unit in the Air National Guard.

The 124th was named "Best Flying Unit in the Air National Guard" and received the prestigious Spaatz Trophy from the National Guard Association. Idaho airmen and Phantom jets went to Canada and Norway to provide critical tactical reconnaissance capabilities to U.S. and NATO forces

=== Composite Wing ===
In the mid-1990s the mission of the 124th changed considerably. On 1 October 1995, the status of the 124th was changed from Group to Wing, and the organization became the 124th Fighter Wing on 1 October 1995.

On 20 April 1996, the Air Force withdrew the last F-4Gs from the 124th FW and the aircraft were consigned to storage at Davis Monthan AFB, Arizona. This marked the final retirement of the F-4 Phantom II from active service with any American military unit, and after 20 years of service with the Idaho Air National Guard. The Phantoms of the 190th Fighter Squadron were replaced by the A-10 Thunderbolt II air-ground support aircraft, better known as the "Warthog".

The 124th also became a composite wing, designated the 124th Wing on 1 September 1996 with the activation of the 189th Airlift Squadron at Boise ANGB. The squadron, assigned to the 124th Operations Group, was a tactical airlift squadron, equipped with Lockheed C-130E Hercules transports. The 124th Wing, consisted of 18 units – two flying squadrons, 15 support units at Gowen Field and an electronic combat training range control squadron assigned to Mountain Home Air Force Base, Idaho.

=== Tactical Airlift ===
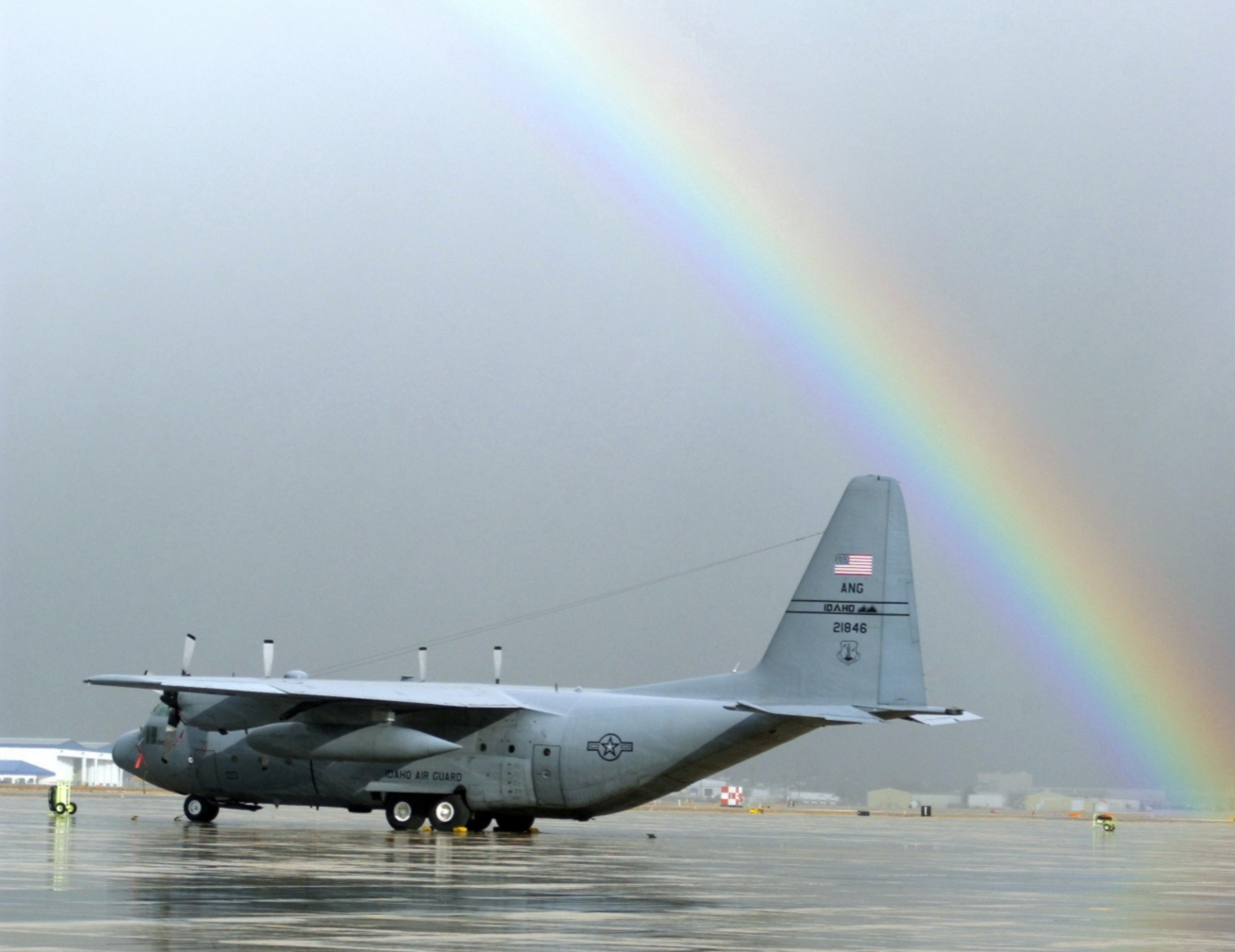
189th Airlift Squadron C-130E 62-1846 on the flight line at Gowen Field, 4 March 2004.

Prior to its activation as a squadron in 1995, the 189th Airlift Squadron was initially formed on 1 April 1984 as the 189th Tactical Reconnaissance Training Flight. Its mission was a Formal Training Unit (FTU) for aircrews being assigned to the 124th Tactical Reconnaissance (later Fighter) group flying RF-4C Phantom II reconnaissance and later F-4G Phantom II electronic warfare aircraft. On 16 March 1992 it was re-designated as the 189th Fighter Flight. The flight used 190th TFS/FS aircraft for its training mission.

With the retirement of the F-4Gs in 1995, the status of the unit was changed from a flight to a squadron, and it received C-130E aircraft for operational missions. The 189th supported countless deployments all over the world in support of the U.S. Southern Command, Operation Allied Force, Operation Southern Watch, Operation Enduring Freedom and Operation Iraqi Freedom. They also responded to winter weather disasters New Mexico and provided humanitarian support for Hurricanes Katrina and Rita.

The Airlift Squadron's awards include the Governor's Outstanding Unit Citation 1997, 1999, and 2005 as well as the Adjutant General Award 1998.

The 189th Airlift Squadron was inactivated as a result of the 2005 Base Realignment and Closure Act on 18 October 2009. Many of the members who were part of the squadron were absorbed within the wing. With the inactivation of the 190th, the wing's designation was returned to the 124th Fighter Wing.

=== Close Air Support ===
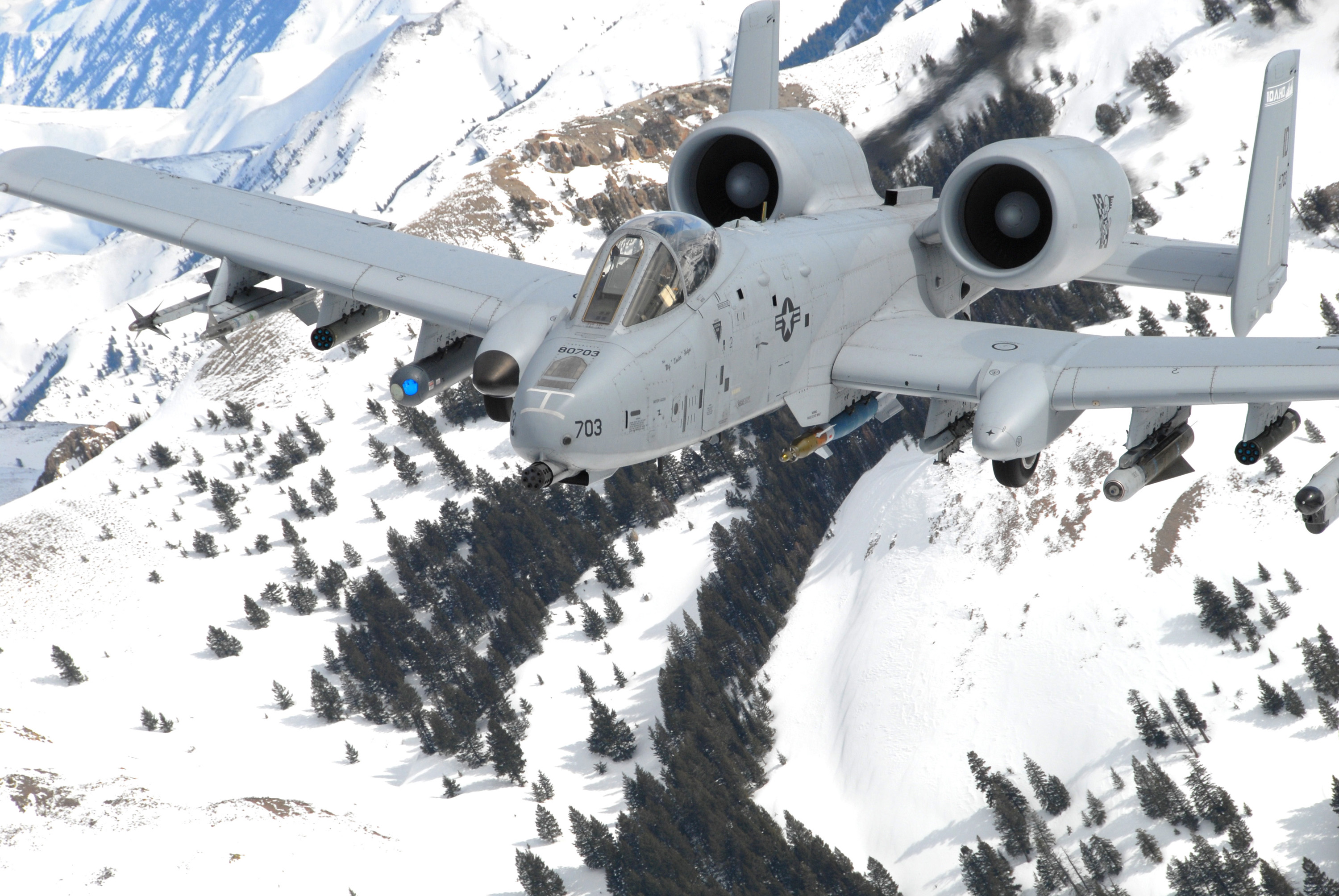
190th Fighter Squadron A-10A flying over Sawtooth Range in 2009

The Warthog, famous for its success against Iraqi armor in the Gulf War, provides close air support to troops on the ground. Idaho's A-10s were deployed during Operation Allied Force in 1999 when they flew combat missions over Kosovo and again in Operation Iraqi Freedom in 2003. Already deployed to Kuwait in support of Operation Southern Watch, more than 250 personnel were mobilized in place. Idaho's A-10s led combat search and rescue and close air support missions in the initial weeks and months of the war. Two 190th pilots received the Distinguished Flying Cross for their efforts. On 8 April 2003, an A-10A (USAF Serial Number '78-0691') of 124th Wing/190th FS was shot down while on a combat mission, reportedly by an Iraqi Roland SAM. The pilot successfully ejected, and was soon rescued by USAF Pararescue forces of the 301st ARRS. The 190th Fighter Squadron also deployed in 2007 to Iraq, and 2008 to Afghanistan.

In 2009, the 124th Fighter Wing was selected a key installation to perform a new Consolidated Install Program for the entire active duty, Guard and Reserve A-10 fleet. A crew of more than 50 full-time personnel performed several important modifications and upgrades to more than 200 A-10 aircraft.

=== Invasion of Iraq friendly fire incident ===
As part of the invasion of Iraq and supporting the British portion of that operation called Operation Telic, on 28 March 2003 two 124th Wing A-10 Thunderbolt II aircraft from the 190th Fighter Squadron flew a mission to destroy artillery and rocket launchers from Iraq's 6th Armor Division, dug in 25 miles (40 km) north of Basra. During the mission, the two A-10 aircraft mistakenly attacked a patrol of four armored vehicles from D Squadron of the British Blues and Royals of the Household Cavalry that were supporting the 16 Air Assault Brigade in Operation Telic. As a result of the attack by the 190th A-10 aircraft, British Lance-Corporal of Horse Matty Hull was killed and five of his colleagues were injured, four seriously.

== Lineage ==
- Established as the 124th Fighter Group (Air Defense) and allotted to the Air National Guard

Activated and extended federal recognition and activated on 14 April 1956
Redesignated 124th Fighter-Interceptor Group on 1 July 1972
Redesignated 124th Tactical Reconnaissance Group on 18 October 1975
Redesignated 124th Fighter Group on 16 October 1991
Redesignated 124th Fighter Wing on 1 October 1995
Redesignated 124th Wing on 1 September 1996
Redesignated 124th Fighter Wing on 18 October 2009

=== Assignments ===
- 140th Air Defense Wing, 1 July 1955
- Idaho Air National Guard, 1 January 1961 – Present

Gained by: Tactical Air Command
Gained by: Air Combat Command, 1 June 1982–Present
189th Airlift Squadron gained by Air Mobility Command, 1 September 1996 – 18 October 2009

=== Components ===
- 124th Operations Group, 1 October 1995 – Present
- 189th Airlift Squadron, 1 September 1996 – 18 October 2009
- 190th Fighter-Interceptor (later Tactical Reconnaissance, Fighter) Squadron, 1 July 1955 – Present

=== Stations ===
- Gowen Field (later Boise Air Terminal), Idaho, 1 July 1955

Designated: Gowen Field Air National Guard Base, Idaho, 1991–Present

=== Aircraft ===
- F-94 Starfire, 1955–1956
- F-89C Scorpion, 1956–1959
- F-86L Sabre Interceptor, 1959–1964
- F-102 Delta Dagger, 1964–1975
- RF-4C Phantom II, 1976–1991
- F-4G Wild Weasel, 1991–1996
- C-130E/H/H2/H2.5 Hercules, 1996–2009
- A-10 Thunderbolt II, 1996–Present
- F-16 Fighting Falcons, Expected to arrive in 2027
