= 190th Fighter Squadron =

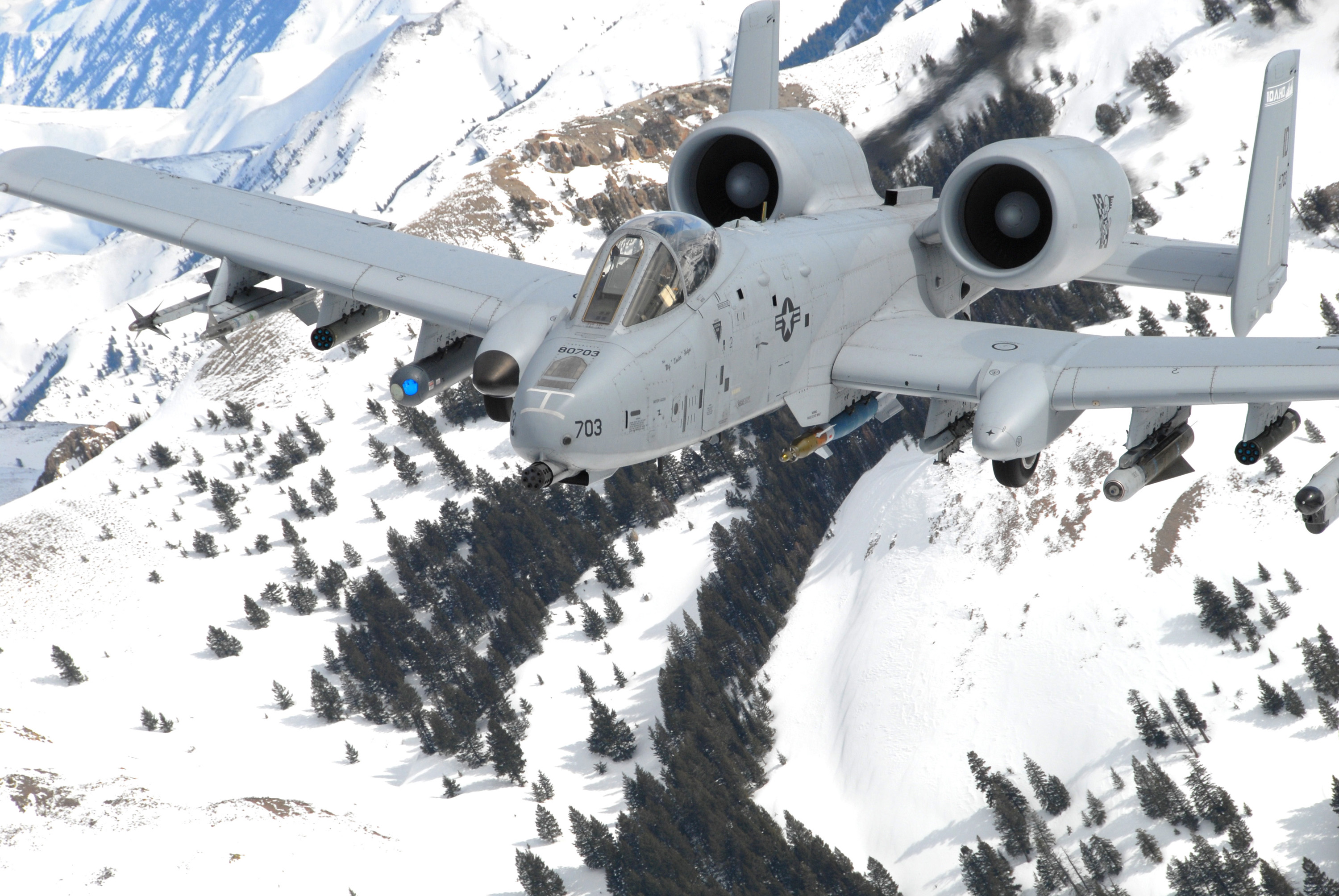
- 190th FS A-10A Thunderbolt II 78-0703 flies over the Sawtooth Range, Idaho, 12 February 2008.
- Active: 1943–1945; 1946–1952; 1952–present
- Country: United States
- Allegiance: Idaho
- Branch: Air National Guard
- Type: Attack
- Role: Ground Support
- Part of: Idaho Air National Guard
- Garrison/HQ: Gowen Field Air National Guard Base, Boise, Idaho
- Nickname: Skullbangers
- Engagements: Operation Southern Watch; Operation Allied Force; Operation Iraqi Freedom

Commanders
- Notable commanders: Thomas G. Lanphier; Ralph D. Townsend Gary Brewington

Insignia
- 190th Fighter Squadron emblem

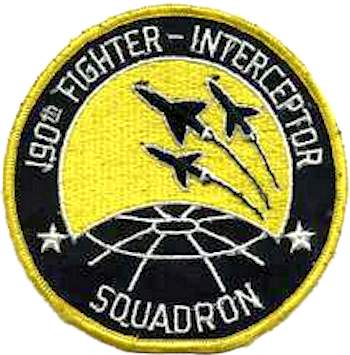
- Patch with 190th Fighter-Interceptor Squadron emblem
- Tail code: ID
- Tail stripe: Red stripe, "Idaho" in white

The 190th Fighter Squadron is a unit of the Idaho Air National Guard 124th Fighter Wing located at Gowen Field Air National Guard Base, Boise, Idaho. The 190th is equipped with the A-10 Thunderbolt II. The 190th Fighter Squadron is known as the "Skull Bangers". The squadron is planned to transition to the F-16 Fighting Falcon starting in spring 2027.

== History ==
=== World War II ===
see 371st Fighter Group for full World War II history

The 405th Fighter Squadron was activated at Richmond Army Air Base, Virginia in the summer of 1943 as one of the three original squadrons of the 371st Fighter Group. The squadron trained in the northeastern United States with Republic P-47 Thunderbolts under First Air Force before moving overseas in the spring of 1944.

Upon arriving in England, the squadron became an element of Ninth Air Force at Bisterne Close, England. The squadron's first combat operation was a fighter sweep over Occupied France. Prior to Operation Overlord, the invasion of Normandy, the 405th flew fighter sweeps, dive bombing and escort missions.

On D-Day the 405th patrolled the beachhead: attacking railroads, trains, vehicles, gun emplacements and other targets. Soon after the invasion, the squadron moved to France and participated in the air interdiction that preceded the Allied breakout at St Lo in late July and supported the following drive across northern France. It continued to operate in northeastern France and southwestern Germany through the winter of 1945, attacking storage dumps, marshalling yard, factories, bridges, roads, and vehicles. In December 1944 it provided close air support for ground forces engaged in the Battle of the Bulge.

The squadron was awarded a Distinguished Unit Citation for its attacks between 15 and 21 March 1945 that contributed to the defeat of Axis forces in southern Germany. It continued combat operations until the Surrender of Germany in May. The squadron remained with the occupation forces in Germany and Austria until October 1945 when it returned to the United States and was inactivated.

=== Idaho Air National Guard ===
The wartime 405th Fighter Squadron was re-activated and re-designated as the 190th Fighter Squadron, and was allotted to the Idaho Air National Guard, on 24 May 1946. It was organized at Gowen Field, south of Boise. It was extended federal recognition on 13 October 1946. The 190th Fighter Squadron was bestowed with the history, honors, and colors of the 405th Fighter Squadron.

During World War II Gowen Field was used as Army Air Forces B-17 Flying Fortress training airfield, and the organization moved into several buildings and hangars vacated just a few months previously by the 402d Army Air Force Base Unit. The squadron was equipped with F-51D Mustangs and was allocated to the Fourth Air Force, Continental Air Command (ConAC) by the National Guard Bureau. As part of the ConAC, the unit trained for tactical bombing missions and air-to-air combat.

Most of the 190th's early airmen were veterans of World War II. The volunteers – 23 officers and 44 enlisted men – met one night each week in a small building on Fort Street in downtown Boise. On 1 April 1951, the unit was activated for duty during the Korean War. It remains the only full‑scale mobilization in the Idaho Air Guard's history. Personnel were sent to Moody AFB, Georgia to replace active-duty airmen sent to Korea, and the squadron became a F-51D Fighter-Bomber training unit. The 190th was returned to Idaho State control in November 1952 and on 1 January 1953, the squadron was reformed at Gowen Field.

==== Air Defense ====
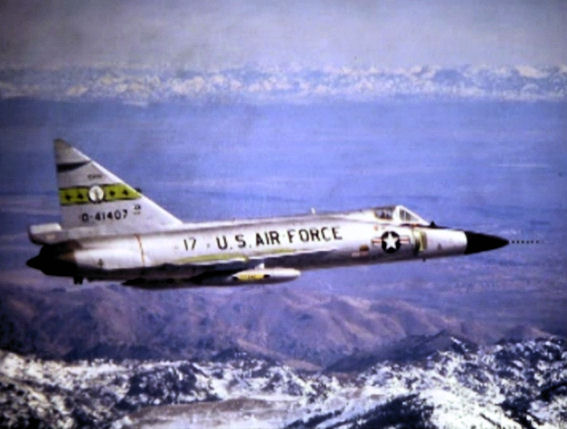
190th Fighter-Interceptor Squadron Convair F-102A 54-1407, about 1967

After the Korean War, the squadron was equipped with the long-range F-51H Mustang and became a part of Air Defense Command. In early 1953 it was equipped with F-86A Sabre daylight jet interceptors, and the squadron was redesignated the 190th Fighter-Interceptor Squadron on 1 January 1953.

On 1 July 1955, the 190th was authorized to expand to a group level, and the 124th Fighter Group (Air Defense) was established by the National Guard Bureau. The 190th FIS becoming the group's flying squadron. Other squadrons assigned into the group were the 124th Headquarters, 124th Material Squadron (Maintenance), 124th Combat Support Squadron, and the 124th USAF Dispensary. Also in 1955, the F-86A day interceptors were replaced by the F-94A Starfire all-weather interceptor. The 190th changed aircraft four more times over the next 23 years to fly the F-89C Scorpion, F-86L Sabre Interceptor and the F-102 Delta Dagger.

In 1958, the 190th implemented the ADC Runway Alert Program, in which interceptors of the 190th FIS were committed to a five-minute runway alert, a task that would last until 1974. In 1968 Air Defense Command was re-designated as Aerospace Defense Command (ADCOM).

==== Tactical Reconnaissance ====
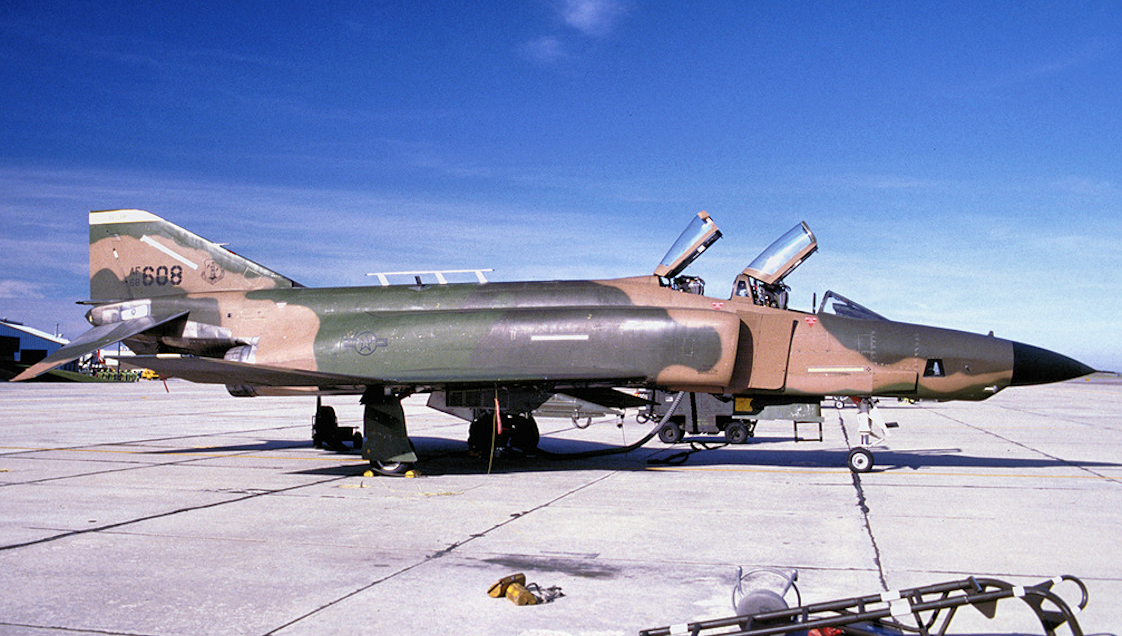
190th TRS RF-4C Phantom II 68-0608 about 1988. The 190th did not carry tail codes on its RF-4C aircraft.

In 1975, the 190th Fighter-Interceptor Squadron changed its name and mission to join the newly‑formed 124th Tactical Reconnaissance Group as the 190th Tactical Reconnaissance Squadron. It was re-equipped by Tactical Air Command with the RF-4C Phantom II Mach 2 high speed reconnaissance aircraft. F-4 Phantom jets would eventually spend 20 years on Gowen Field, longer than any other aircraft in the history of Idaho's Air National Guard.

The unarmed RF-4C carried high resolution cameras and electronic sensors, which soon proved their worth to thousands of people in Idaho. RF-4C jets tracked flood waters pouring from the ruptured Teton Dam within hours of the dam's collapse in 1976 to show officials where flood waters were headed in time to warn people living in endangered areas. Aerial photographs were also taken immediately after the 1983 Borah Peak earthquake near Challis. The Challis-Mackay region experienced rather thorough damage, with 11 commercial buildings and 39 homes with major damage; while another 200 houses were damaged, minor to moderate. The reconnaissance photos helped emergency response crews locate and evaluate the damage.

Idaho aircrews excelled in their military mission as well. Two Idaho fliers were named "Best Aerial Reconnaissance Aircrew" at an international competition. The 190th TRS was named "Best Flying Unit in the Air National Guard" and received the prestigious Spaatz Trophy from the National Guard Association. Idaho airmen and Phantom jets went to Canada and Norway to provide critical tactical reconnaissance capabilities to U.S. and NATO forces.

==== Electronic Warfare ====
In 1991, Idaho's Air Guard changed aircraft and mission again. The unarmed RF-4C Phantom jets were replaced by F‑4G Phantom II "Wild Weasel" Electronic Warfare aircraft received from the 37th Tactical Fighter Wing at George AFB, California. The F-4G was designed as an anti-Surface to Air Missile aircraft to jam and attack enemy radars when they were activated. "Wild Weasel" tactics and techniques were first developed in 1965 during the Vietnam War, and were later integrated into the Suppression of Enemy Air Defenses (SEAD) a plan used by US air forces to establish immediate air control, prior to possible full-scale conflict.

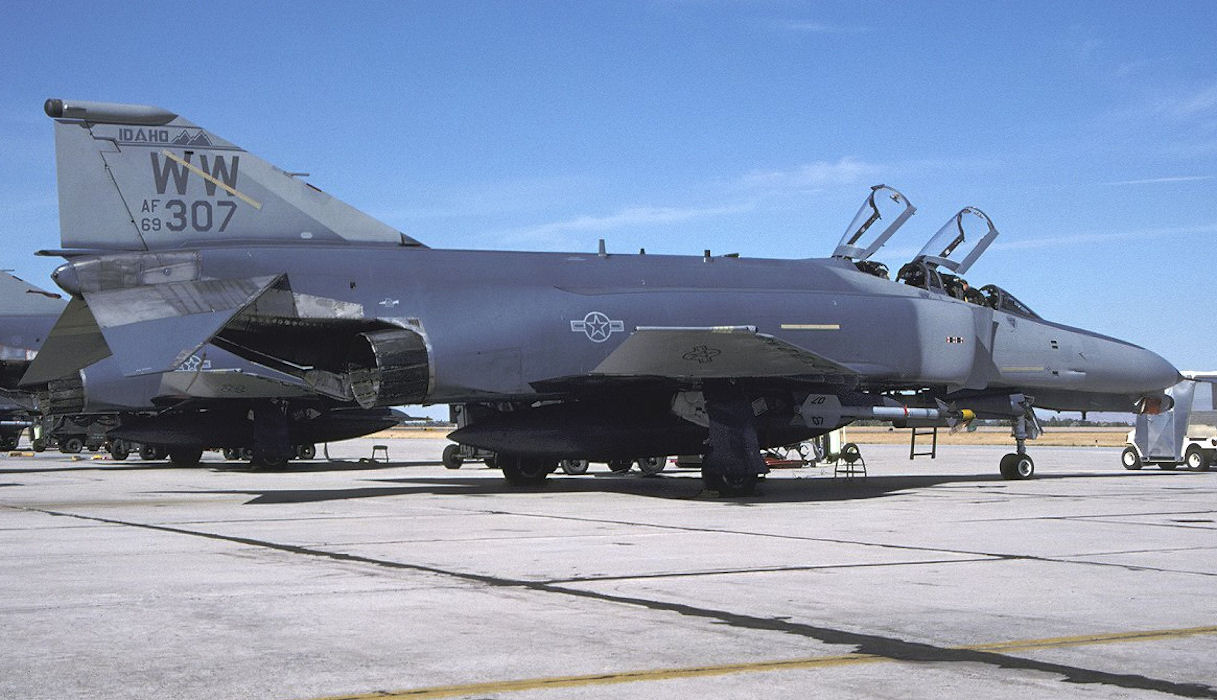
190th FS F-4G "Wild Weasel" 69-307

The 190th TRS began its conversion from the RF-4C to the F-4G in June 1991, and the Idaho ANG was to be the only ANG unit to operate the F-4G. The squadron was re-designated as the 190th Fighter Squadron with the changeover of its parent 124th to the Air Force Objective Wing organization. In 1992, the parent 124th Fighter Group became part of the new Air Combat Command.

In April 1993 the squadron's Wild Weasel jets were sent to Southwest Asia to support Operation Southern Watch, enforcing the no‑fly zone over southern Iraq. Twice 190th airmen were challenged by illegal Iraqi air defense radar near Basra. The threats were answered – and silenced – with AGM-88 High-Speed Anti-Radiation Missile (HARM) anti-radiation missiles. Less than six months after ending its first Southwest Asia tour, the squadron began a second Southern Watch deployment, followed by two back‑to‑back tours in support of Operation Provide Comfort, enforcing the northern no‑fly zone and protecting Kurds from Iraqi aggression. From 1993 to 1995 there were a total of four deployments to the Gulf. The last such deployment returned to Boise in December 1995. Idaho's airmen served longer in Southwest Asia than any other flying unit in the Air National Guard.

==== A-10 era ====
On 20 April 1996, the last F-4Gs were withdrawn by the 124th FW and were consigned to storage at Davis Monthan AFB, Arizona. This marked the final departure of the F-4 Phantom II from active service with any American military unit, and after 20 years of service with the Idaho Air National Guard.

The Phantoms were replaced by the A-10 Thunderbolt II air-ground support aircraft, better known as the "Warthog". Idaho's A-10s were deployed during Operation Allied Force in 1999 when they flew combat missions over Kosovo and again in Operation Iraqi Freedom in 2003. Already deployed to Kuwait in support of Operation Southern Watch, more than 250 personnel were mobilized in place. Idaho's A-10s led combat search and rescue and close air support missions in the initial weeks and months of the war. Two 190th pilots received the Distinguished Flying Cross for their efforts. The 190th Fighter Squadron also deployed in 2007 to Iraq and 2008 to Afghanistan.

==== 2003 friendly fire incident ====
As part of the invasion of Iraq and supporting the British portion of that operation called Operation Telic, on 28 March 2003 two 190th A-10 Thunderbolt II aircraft, flown by an unidentified Major and Lieutenant Colonel Gus Kohntopp, flew a mission to destroy artillery and rocket launchers from Iraq's 6th Armor Division, dug in 25 miles (40 km) north of Basra. During the mission, the two A-10 aircraft mistakenly attacked a patrol of four armored vehicles from D Squadron of the British Blues and Royals of the Household Cavalry that were supporting the 16 Air Assault Brigade in Operation Telic. As a result of the attack by the 190th A-10 aircraft, British Lance-Corporal of Horse (L/CoH) Matty Hull was killed, and five of his colleagues were injured, four seriously.

The aftermath of the attack caused controversy, especially in the United Kingdom (UK), as some, including Hull's family, complained of a lack of cooperation with the British inquest into the death of L/CoH Hull by the United States government and the UK's Ministry of Defense (MoD). The United States and UK MoD denied for a period of time that a video existed of the incident and then later admitted that a video existed but couldn't be released because it was "classified."

In a statement, Lt. Tony Vincelli, spokesman for the 190th Fighter Squadron said the U.S. Air Force had conducted its own investigation into the incident in 2003, but the results of that investigation or the names of the two 190th pilots involved were not publicly released. He added that the investigation, "did not result in a court-martial." In a further statement, Vincelli apologized for the incident and stated that no adverse action was taken against either pilot involved. On 6 February 2007 the Sun named one of the 190th pilots involved as "Colonel" Gus Kohntopp. On 16 March 2007, the inquest coroner, Andrew Walker, returned a narrative verdict, stating that the killing of L/CoH Hull was "unlawful". Walker said: "The attack on the convoy amounted to an assault. It was unlawful because there was no lawful reason for it and in that respect it was criminal."

== Lineage ==
- Constituted as the 405th Fighter Squadron on 25 May 1943

Activated on 15 July 1943
Inactivated on 10 November 1945

- Redesignated 190th Fighter Squadron and allotted to the National Guard on 24 May 1946

Organized on 26 July 1946
Extended federal recognition on 13 October 1946
Federalized and placed on active duty on 1 April 1951
Redesignated 190th Fighter-Bomber Squadron, on 1 November 1951
Inactivated, released from active duty and returned to Idaho state control on 15 November 1952
Activated on 15 November 1952
Redesignated 190th Fighter-Interceptor Squadron on 1 January 1953
Redesignated 190th Tactical Reconnaissance Squadron on 18 October 1975
Redesignated 190th Fighter Squadron on 16 October 1991

=== Assignments ===
- 371st Fighter Group, 15 July 1943 – 10 November 1945
- 86th Fighter Wing, 13 October 1946
- 140th Fighter Group, 1 November 1950
- 146th Fighter-Bomber Wing, 1 April 1951
- 140th Fighter-Bomber Group, 15 November 1952 – 1 January 1953
- 140th Fighter-Bomber Group, 1 January 1953
- 124th Fighter Group (Air Defense) (later 124th Fighter-Interceptor Group, 124th Tactical Reconnaissance Group, 124th Fighter Group), 1 July 1955
- 124th Operations Group, 1 October 1995

=== Stations ===
- Richmond Army Air Base, Virginia, 15 July 1943
- Camp Springs Army Air Field, Maryland, 30 September 1943
- Richmond Army Air Base, Virginia, 18 January – 14 February 1944
- RAF Bisterne (AAF-415), England, March 1944
- Beuzeville Airfield (A-6), France, June 1944
- Perthes Airfield (A-65), France, 18 September 1944
- Dole/Tavaux Airfield (Y-7), France, 1 October 1944
- Tantonville Airfield (Y-1), France, 20 December 1944
- Metz Airfield (Y-34), France, 15 February 1945
- Frankfurt/Eschborn Airfield (Y-74), Germany, 7 April 1945
- Furth/Industriehafen Airfield (R-30), Germany, 5 May 1945
- AAF Station Hoersching, Austria, 16 August 1945
- Strasbourg/Entzheim Airport, France, September– October 1945
- Camp Shanks, New York, 9–10 November 1945
- Gowen Field (later Boise Air Terminal, Gowen Field Air National Guard Base), Idaho, 13 October 1946

=== Aircraft ===
- P-47 Thunderbolt, 1943–1945
- F-51D Mustang, 1946–1952
- F-86A Sabre, 1953–1955
- F-94 Starfire, 1955–1956
- F-89C Scorpion, 1956–1959
- F-86L Sabre Interceptor, 1959–1964
- F-102 Delta Dagger, 1964–1975
- RF-4C Phantom II, 1976–1991
- F-4G Wild Weasel, 1991–1996
- A-10 Thunderbolt II, 1996 – present
- F-16 Fighting Falcon, transition to start in the spring of 2027
