= RAF Bisterne =

WWII airbase in Hampshire, England

RAF Bisterne USAAF Station AAF-415
- Near Bisterne, Hampshire in England
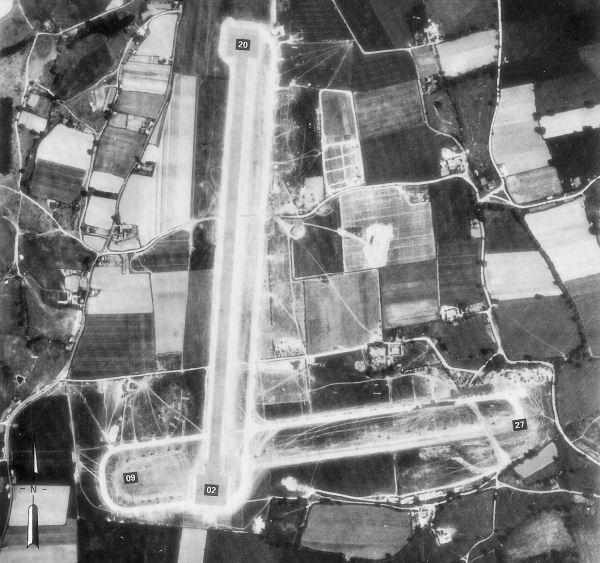
- Aerial Photo of Bisterne Airfield, 22 May 1944. More than 50 P-47 Thunderbolts of the 371st Fighter Group are dispersed along the perimeter loop.

Site information
- Type: RAF Advanced landing ground
- Code: BS
- Owner: Air Ministry
- Operator: Royal Air Force; United States Army Air Forces
- Controlled by: Ninth Air Force

Location
- Shown within Hampshire RAF Bisterne (the United Kingdom)
- Coordinates: 50°49′06″N 001°46′50″W

Site history
- Built: 1944
- In use: 1944 - 1944
- Battles/wars: European theatre of World War II

Airfield information
- Elevation: 15 metres (49 ft) AMSL
Runways
Direction	Length and surface
02/20	Hard earth
09/27	Hard earth

Royal Air Force Bisterne or more simply RAF Bisterne is a former Royal Air Force Advanced landing ground in Hampshire, England. The airfield is located in the hamlet of Bisterne approximately 2 miles (3.2 km) south of Ringwood.

Opened in March 1944, Bisterne was a prototype for the type of temporary Advanced Landing Ground type airfield that would be built in France after D-Day, when the need advanced landing fields would become urgent as the Allied forces moved east across France and Germany. It was used by the United States Army Air Forces as a fighter airfield. It was closed late in the summer of 1944.

Today the airfield is a mixture of agricultural fields with no recognizable remains.

== History ==
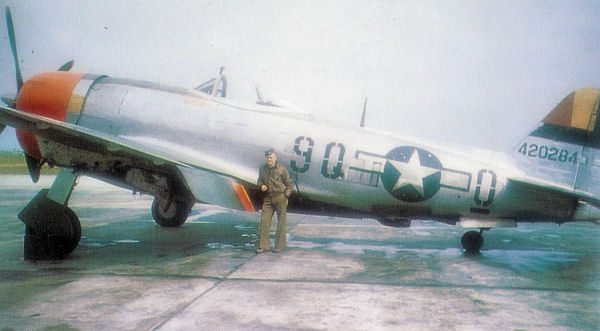
Republic P-47D-28-RE Thunderbolt Serial 44-200284 of the 404th Fighter Squadron (photo taken at Furth/Industriehafen, Germany

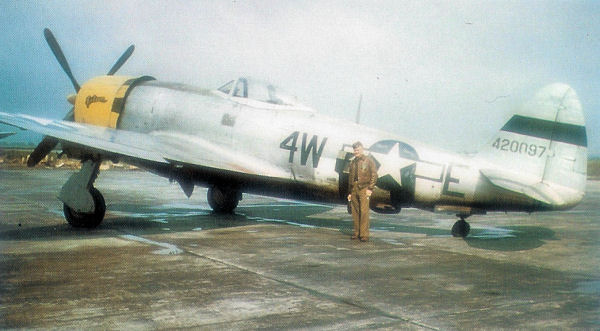
Republic P-47D-28-RE Thunderbolt Serial 44-200097 of the 406th Fighter Squadron (photo taken at Furth/Industriehafen, Germany

Bisterne was used by the No. 2774 Squadron RAF Regiment.

Bisterne was known as USAAF Station AAF-415 for security reasons by the USAAF during the war, and by which it was referred to instead of location. Its USAAF Station Code was "BS".

On 7 March 1944 the 371st Fighter Group arrived . Equipped with Republic P-47 Thunderbolts, the 347th FG arrived from Richmond AAF Virginia. Tactical squadrons of the group and squadron fuselage codes were:

- 404th Fighter Squadron (9Q)
- 405th Fighter Squadron (8N)
- 406th Fighter Squadron (4W)

The 371st was a group of Ninth Air Force's 70th Fighter Wing, IX Tactical Air Command. The 371st moved from Bisterne between 17 and 29 June 1944 to its Advanced Landing Ground (ALG) at Beuzeville France (ALG A-6).

== Current use ==
In 2004 a small memorial was dedicated by a former P47D pilot on the outskirts of Brixey's Farm yard barn at the end of the metalled bridleway eastwards off the B3347 at Kingston as a lasting memorial to the men and machines who flew from the wartime Bisterne airfield.

== See also ==
- List of former Royal Air Force stations
