= Boise Airport =

Airport in Boise, Idaho, United States

Boise Airport Boise Air Terminal

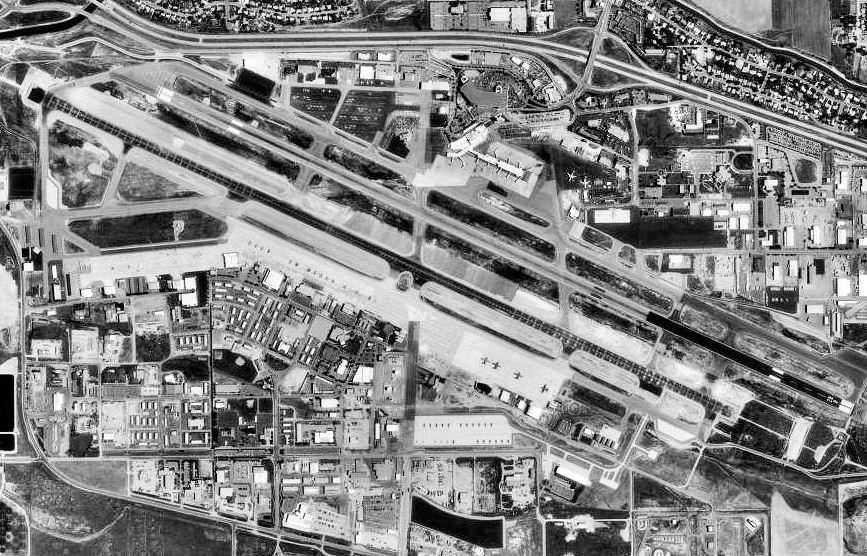
- 1998 USGS photo
- IATA: BOI; ICAO: KBOI; FAA LID: BOI; WMO: 72681

Summary
- Airport type: Public / Military
- Owner/Operator: City of Boise
- Serves: Treasure Valley
- Opened: 1936; 90 years ago
- Focus city for: Alaska Airlines
- Elevation AMSL: 2,872 ft (875 m)
- Coordinates: 43°33′52″N 116°13′22″W
- Website: www.iflyboise.com

Maps
- FAA Airport Diagram as of January 2021
- Interactive map of Boise Airport

Runways
Direction	Length		Surface
Direction	ft	m	Surface
10L/28R	10,000	3,048	Asphalt
10R/28L	9,763	2,976	Asphalt

Helipads
Number	Length		Surface
Number	ft	m	Surface
H1	50	15	Asphalt

Statistics (2025)
- Aircraft operations: 141,284
- Total cargo (lbs.): 62,531,601
- Total Passengers: 5,229,399 ▲5%
- Gates: 23
- Sources: Federal Aviation Administration; City of Boise

Boise Airport (IATA: BOI, ICAO: KBOI, FAA LID: BOI) (Boise Air Terminal or Gowen Field) is a joint civil-military airport in the western United States in Idaho, three miles (5 km) south of downtown Boise in Ada County. The airport is operated by the city of Boise Department of Aviation, overseen by an airport commission. Boise Airport is the busiest airport in the state with more than 5.2 million passengers serviced in 2025. Boise Airport services roughly ten times as many passengers as the next busiest airport at Idaho Falls. In 2020 it serviced more passenger flights than all other Idaho airports combined.

Boise is a landing rights airfield requiring international general aviation flights to receive permission from a Customs and Border Protection officer before landing.

In addition to being a commercial and general aviation airport, Boise also functions concurrently as a USAF military facility as used by the 124th Fighter Wing (124 FW) of the Idaho Air National Guard on the Gowen Field Air National Guard Base portion of the airport. The 124 FW operates the A-10 Thunderbolt II aircraft.

The National Interagency Fire Center is based in the city of Boise and the Boise Airport is used for logistical support. The United States Forest Service (USFS) also uses Boise Airport as a base for aerial firefighting air tankers during the wildfire season.

Boise Airport enplaned 2,248,435 passengers in 2022, an increase of 24% vs. 2021 when 1,806,838 passengers were enplaned.

== Terminals and development ==
Boise Airport currently has one terminal with two concourses and serves eight airlines. The terminal is a three-story building with four baggage carousels, rental car counters on the ground floor, all ticketing counters, a consolidated security checkpoint including TSA PreCheck and CLEAR Security, offices, and fast-food outlets.

The two concourses have 24 gates and 13 jet bridges. Concourse B has 13 gates and 11 jet bridges (with one jet bridge serving each of B21 a/b and B22 a/b). Airline gate assignments are broken down as follows: B10, B11, B21 a/b (United), B15, B17 (Southwest), B14, B16, B19 (Common Use), B18 (American), B20, B22 a/b (Delta). The common-use gates are used as follows: B14 (Delta), B16 (American, Frontier), B19 (Allegiant, Southwest, Sun Country). Concourse C serves Alaska Airlines and has 11 gates; however, only gates C8a and C12 are equipped with jet bridges, with the rest having covered walkways.

In 2016, Boise Airport released a new master plan outlining their short, medium, and long-term plans. Each of these terms would mark different stages of the airport's growth and renewal, with the largest projects being three new parking garages, upgrades to Concourse B, and a new Concourse A.

=== Concourse A ===
The new Concourse A will sit on the other side of the main terminal from concourses B and C in an existing rental car parking lot. It is scheduled to have ten new gates, all equipped with jet bridges and able to handle narrow-body aircraft. Plans call for one of the new gates to be equipped to handle wide bodied aircraft, five equipped for narrowbody aircraft, and four equipped for regional jets up to an A220. Phase 1 of the new concourse is scheduled to begin construction in 2027 and will include six gates, three for mainline aircraft and three for regional aircraft. The makeup of Phases 2 and 3 would depend on the needs of the airport and have not been determined yet.

=== Parking garages ===
Increasing passenger traffic at BOI requires the addition of parking. To this end, the airport is building three new parking garages. One will be a public garage for passengers with 940 spaces. This will be built on an existing surface lot. The other two garages, an employee garage and a rental car center garage, are being relocated to make room for Concourse A. The new employee garage will have 680 spaces and the rental car garage will have 880 spaces. The airport has begun construction on its first two of the three parking garages. In late January 2022, it broke ground on the construction for the new employee parking garage after several delays, and its new public parking garage expansion. Both these projects plan to be finished by the end of 2023. The airport also plans to break ground on a new 2 part rental car garage in 2024, this will make room for the new Concourse A.

The new seven story consolidated rent a car garage (CONRAC) opened on September 1, 2026 with 10 different brands on 6 of the 7 floors. The facility includes Avis, Budget (Level 5/6) Payless (Level 6), Hertz, Dollar, Thrifty (Level 4), Sixt (Level 3), Enterprise, Alamo (Level 2), and National (Level 1).

== History ==
Boise's first municipal airport, Booth Field, was built in 1926 on a gravel bed near the south bank of the Boise River, now the campus of Boise State University. The first commercial airmail flight in the United States stopped to refuel at this airfield on April 26, 1926, carried by Varney Airlines. Varney began operating regularly out of Boise in 1933, later merging with National Air Transport to become United Airlines. Since United traces its roots to Varney, United is recognized as the airline that has operated the longest out of Boise, 100 years as of 2026. Less than four months after his historic transatlantic flight, the airfield hosted Charles Lindbergh and the Spirit of St. Louis on September 4, 1927.

The current airport has its origins in 1936 when Boise began buying and leasing land for the airport. By 1938, Boise had the longest runway in the United States at 8,800 feet (2,680 m), built as a Works Progress Administration (WPA) project under sponsorship of the city. The steel hangar for Varney Airlines was moved to the present field in 1939. As aircraft grew the hangar was no longer big enough and was converted into a passenger terminal. It was part of the modern terminal facility until the completion of a new terminal in 2004.

During World War II, the U.S. Army Air Forces leased the field for use as a training base for B-17 Flying Fortress and B-24 Liberator bomber crews. More than six thousand men were stationed there during the war.

The field was named Gowen Field in 1941 on July 23, after 1st Lt Paul R. Gowen. Born and raised in Caldwell, he attended the University of Idaho for two years, then obtained an appointment to West Point in 1929, and graduated ninth in his class in 1933. While piloting a twin-engine B-10 bomber in the Army Air Corps, Gowen was killed instantly in a crash in Panama in July 1938. The right engine failed shortly after take-off from Albrook Field, near Panama City. The other two crew members, navigator and radio operator, survived and crawled from the wreckage with burns.

After the war the part of the field used by the Army Air Forces was returned to the city. The Idaho Air National Guard began leasing the airfield after the war and continues to do so.

=== Jet service ===
The jet age arrived in Boise during the mid-1960s. In 1966, United Airlines was operating Boeing 727-100 jetliners into the airport with round trip routings of Boise (BOI)-Salt Lake City (SLC)-Chicago (O'Hare, ORD)-Boston (BOS) and Seattle (SEA)-Portland (PDX)-Boise (BOI)-Salt Lake City (SLC)-Denver (Stapleton, DEN)-Chicago (ORD)-New York (Newark, EWR). United was also serving the airport with Douglas DC-6 and DC-6B propliners at this time. West Coast Airlines introduced Douglas DC-9-10 jet service during the late 1960s and in 1968 was operating round trip routings of Seattle (Boeing Field, BFI)-Portland (PDX)-Boise (BOI)-Salt Lake City (SLC) and Portland (PDX)-Seattle (BFI)-Boise (BOI)-Salt Lake City (SLC) with the DC-9. West Coast was also serving Boise with Fairchild F-27 turboprops and Douglas DC-3 prop aircraft in 1968. The same year West Coast merged with Bonanza Air Lines and Pacific Air Lines to form Air West which was subsequently renamed Hughes Airwest which, in turn, continued to serve Boise with Douglas DC-9 (-10, -30) jets. In 1972, Hughes Airwest was operating non-stop DC-9 service from Boise to Portland and Salt Lake City and was also flying direct DC-9 service to Los Angeles (LAX), Las Vegas (LAS), Phoenix (PHX), San Diego (SAN), Burbank (BUR), Santa Ana (SNA), Spokane (GEG) and other regional destinations.

By 1976, Hughes Airwest and United were still the only two airlines operating jet service into Boise according to the Official Airline Guide (OAG). United had also expanded its Boise service by this time and was operating nonstop flights with Boeing 727 (-100, -200) and larger Douglas DC-8 jetliners to Chicago (O'Hare), Denver (Stapleton), Portland, Salt Lake City, San Francisco, Seattle, Reno, and Spokane as well as direct, no change of plane jet service to New York (LaGuardia), Los Angeles, Boston, Washington, D.C. (National), San Diego, and Hartford, according to the Official Airline Guide (OAG). United and Hughes Airwest were operating all of their flights into Boise with jet aircraft at this time in 1976. Also according to the OAG, in early 1985 Cascade Airways was operating international service of a sorts into Boise with a direct flight once a week from Calgary via intermediate stops in Spokane and Lewiston, ID.

Following the federal Airline Deregulation Act of 1978, a number of air carriers operated jet service into the airport at different times over the years from the late 1970s through the 1990s. The following list of airlines is taken from OAG editions from 1979 to 1999:

- Alaska Airlines (mainline jet service)
- America West Airlines
- Cascade Airways
- Continental Airlines
- Frontier Airlines (1950-1986)
- Horizon Air
- Morris Air
- Mountain West Airlines
- Northwest Airlines
- Pacific Express
- Pacific Southwest Airlines (PSA)
- Republic Airlines (1979-1986) (acquired Hughes Airwest in 1980)
- Sunworld International Airways (operating as Sunworld Airlines)
- United Express operated by Air Wisconsin
- US Airways
- Western Airlines
- Wien Air Alaska

Between 2001 and 2005, Boise Airport was remodeled with a new terminal and an elevated roadway for departures, constructed in two phases. Phase 1 considered amenities such as baggage claim, lobby, and food and beverage concession, which were completed in 2003. Phase 2 dealt with security checkpoints and a new concourse (Concourse C) and the remodeling of Concourse B, which were completed in 2005.

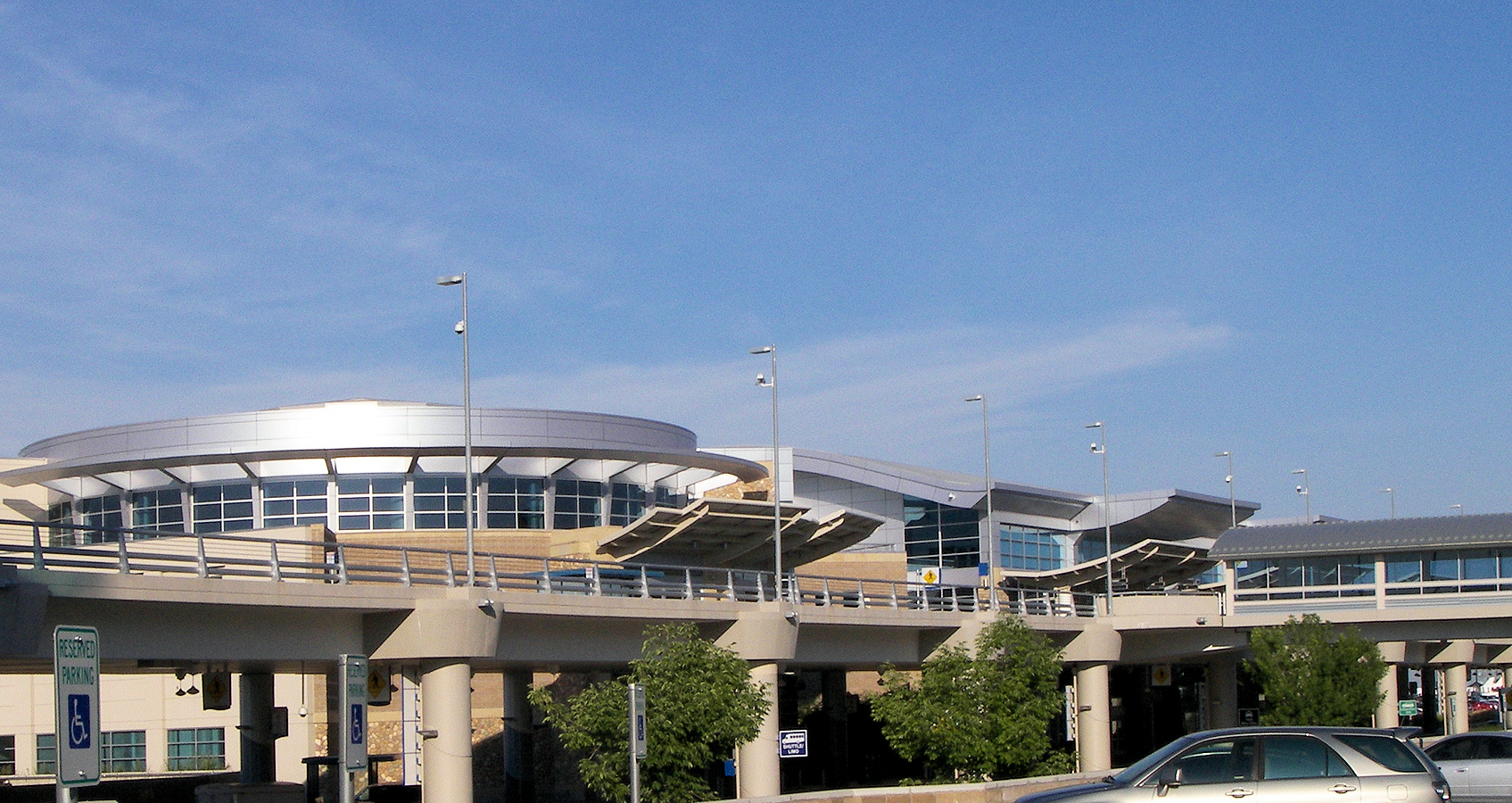
Boise's passenger terminal in 2009

The Boise Airport Passenger Terminal designed by CSHQA is a three-story, steel-framed 378,000-square-foot (35,100 m^{2}) state-of-the-art aviation facility. Curvilinear, steel trusses create the undulating ceiling plane of the ticket lobby and define the signature profile of the building. The terminal has garnered national attention for the beauty of its design and is considered a prototypical post-9/11 facility.

The Boise Airport was fourth in passenger satisfaction in the J.D. Power and Associates 2004 Global Airport Satisfaction Index Study. Power no longer publishes a global listing, and the airport was not listed in the 2017 North American ranking.

The Boise Airport was a hub for Horizon Air from the late 1980s to the early 2000s. Horizon Air was acquired by the Alaska Air Group, the parent company of Alaska Airlines, in 1986 and began code sharing flights for Alaska Airlines at that time. During the summer of 1990, Horizon Air was operating up to 36 departures a day from the airport to destinations in Idaho, Oregon, and Washington, as well as direct one stop service to Salt Lake City. By 1999, Horizon Air was operating up to 22 departures a day from Boise with Fokker F28 Fellowship jets with additional flights being operated with de Havilland Canada DHC-8 Dash 8 turboprops. The regional airline also previously operated Dornier 328, Fairchild F-27, and Swearingen Metroliner propjets. Boise is currently a focus city for Alaska Airlines service operated by both Horizon Air and code sharing partner SkyWest Airlines.

Boise was also one of the primary destinations served by Cascade Airways which competed with Horizon Air. In 1985, Cascade was serving the airport with British Aircraft Corporation BAC One-Eleven jets and Swearingen Metroliner propjets with regional service in Idaho, Oregon, Washington, and Montana, as well as nonstop jet service to Reno, Nevada, and connecting flights to Canada at Calgary, Alberta.

== Facilities ==
Boise Airport covers 5,000 acres (7.8 sq mi; 20 km^{2}) at an elevation of 2,872 feet (875 m) at its east end. It has two runways and one helipad:

- 10L/28R: 10,000 by 150 feet (3,048 m × 46 m), asphalt, weight capacity: 75,000 pounds (34,000 kg)/single wheel; VASI system
- 10R/28L: 9,763 by 150 feet (2,976 m × 46 m), asphalt, weight capacity: 75,000 pounds (34,000 kg)/single wheel; VASI, ILS/DME
- Helipad H1: 50 by 50 feet (15 by 15 m), asphalt.

In the year ending May 31, 2023, the airport had 139,983 aircraft operations, average 383 per day: 46% general aviation, 39% airline, 9% air taxi, and 5% military. 273 aircraft were then based at this airport: 147 single-engine, 22 multi-engine, 37 jet, 17 helicopter and 50 military. Of the top 100 United States airports, BOI is among four airports that does not charge a PFC.

The airport can handle minor maintenance and repairs through fixed-base operators Jackson Jet Center, Turbo Air and Western Aircraft.

Law enforcement is handled by the Boise Police Department (BPD). In 2006, the Airport Division had an authorized strength of 1 lieutenant, 2 sergeants, and 28 officers, and there were five TSA certified K-9 units trained in explosive detection.

The original layout was the primary runway (10R/28L) at 8,800 feet (2,680 m), with two others at 6,000 feet (1,830 m), both are retired but still visible as taxiways. The north–south runway (16/34, offset slightly northeast, now taxiway E) was aligned with present-day S. Zeppelin Street (approximately with Owyhee Street to the north), and the east–west runway (7/25, now taxiway F) was offset slightly southwest. The intersection point of the two former runways was on today's main taxiway A, near the terminal. The second parallel runway (10L/28R) was formerly 7,400 feet (2,255 m); it was extended east from taxiway C in 1998, which raised the field elevation fourteen feet (4.3 m).

=== ATC tower ===
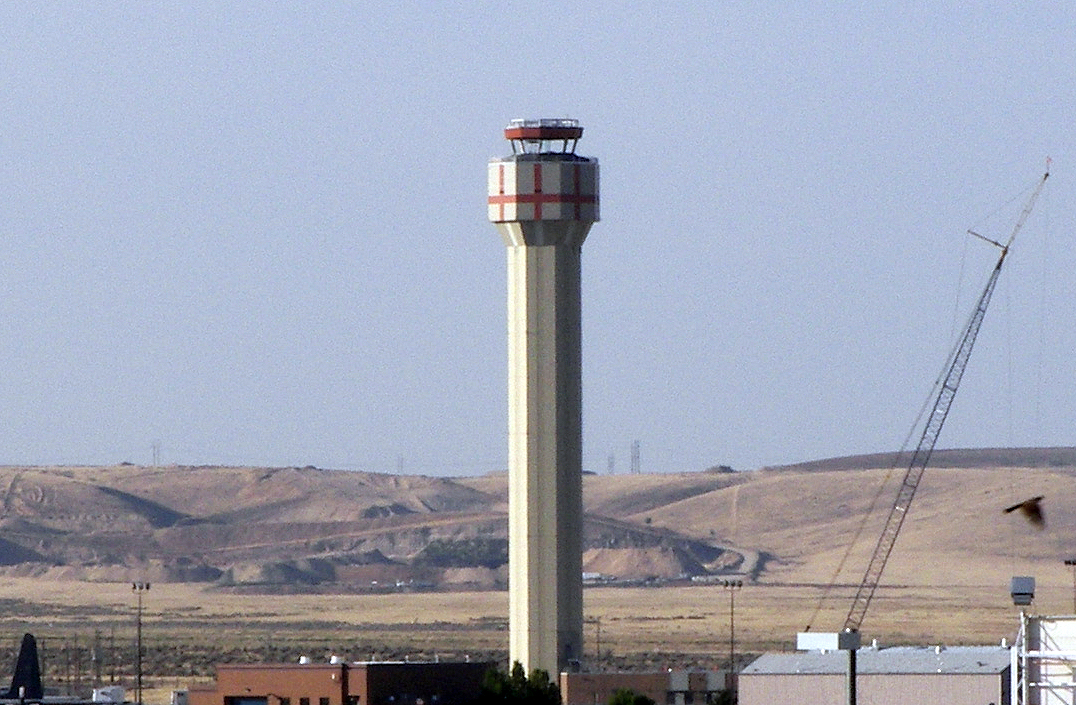
The new air traffic control tower under construction in 2009

In 2008, city officials broke ground for Boise Air Terminal's new airport traffic control tower, the latest facilities improvement. The tower's height at 295 feet (90 m) made it the tallest building in the state of Idaho (surpassed in 2013 by the 323-foot (98 m) Zions Bank Idaho Headquarters Building in downtown Boise), and the Northwest's tallest control tower. It was relocated to the south side of the airport in order to control an existing 5,000-foot (1,525 m) Guard assault strip, runway 09/27, south of Gowen Road. The tower was planned and constructed when it was believed that the radar functions would be moved to Salt Lake City in Utah. After it was decided to leave the radar positions in Boise, the facility at the base of the tower was redesigned and partially remodeled to house the Terminal Radar Approach Control (TRACON).

The tower and TRACON opened on September 16, 2013, with updated electronics and equipment, including the STARS radar system; improving services and safety for pilots and the flying public. With the expanded facilities and new equipment, the TRACON operates the approach control for Boise Airport, and also remotely operates the approach control for the Bozeman Airport in Montana. The TRACON was then renamed Big Sky Approach to reflect the broader geographical coverage. The consolidation of Boise and Bozeman approach control facilities into Big Sky Approach is part of the FAA's continuing plan to consolidate approach control services across the nation. Boise's TRACON was designed with the option of adding additional radar scopes, and may offer approach control services to other airports in the future.

=== Gowen Field Air National Guard Base ===
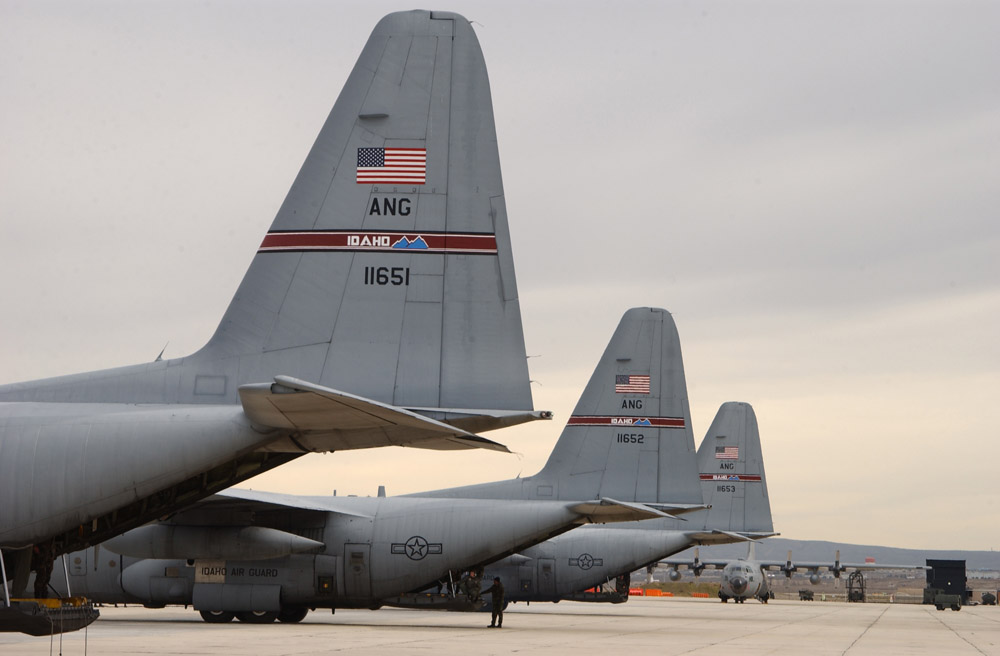
C-130s previously operated by the Idaho ANG parked on the ramp at Gowen Field

Gowen Field Air National Guard Base primarily refers to the military facilities on the south side of the runways, which includes Air National Guard, Army National Guard, and reserve units of the Army, Navy, and Marine Corps. The field is home to the 124th Fighter Wing (124 FW), Idaho Air National Guard, which consists of one flying squadron operationally-gained by the Air Combat Command (ACC) and 12 additional support units. The aircraft based at Gowen Field ANGB is the A-10 Thunderbolt II close air support attack aircraft of the 190th Fighter Squadron (190 FS).

The 124 FW was previously designated as the 124th Wing (124 WG), a composite Air Combat Command (ACC) and Air Mobility Command (AMC) unit that also operated C-130H Hercules transport aircraft in the 189th Airlift Squadron (189 AS), the 189 AS being operationally-gained by AMC.

BRAC 2005 directed that the Idaho Air National Guard divest itself of the C-130 mission by 2009, transferring its C-130s to the Wyoming Air National Guard, while retaining its A-10 fighter mission. This action was completed in 2009 and the 124 WG was redesignated the 124 FW at that time. The 124 FW is composed of over 1000 military personnel, consisting of just over 300 full-time Active Guard and Reserve (AGR) and Air Reserve Technician (ART) personnel and over 700 traditional part-time Air National Guardsmen.

=== First responder training area ===
In February 2011, FedEx donated a surplus Boeing 727-200 cargo jet (tail number N275FE) to the City of Boise for use as a training tool for emergency first responders. The aircraft—stripped of engines—is parked near the southeastern end of Boise's third runway—a location more than a mile southeast of, and not visible from, the main passenger terminal. Several agencies use the plane for training purposes.

== Airlines and destinations ==
=== Passenger ===
Airlines	Destinations
Alaska Airlines	Burbank, Las Vegas, Los Angeles, Ontario, Orange County, Phoenix–Sky Harbor, Portland (OR), Pullman, Sacramento, San Diego, San Francisco, San Jose (CA), Seattle/Tacoma, Spokane; Seasonal: Anchorage, Bozeman, Honolulu (begins December 17, 2026), Palm Springs, Santa Rosa
Allegiant Air	Orange County, Phoenix/Mesa
American Airlines	Chicago–O'Hare, Dallas/Fort Worth; Seasonal: Phoenix–Sky Harbor
American Eagle	Phoenix–Sky Harbor
Delta Air Lines	Atlanta, Minneapolis/St. Paul, Salt Lake City
Delta Connection	Los Angeles, Salt Lake City, Seattle/Tacoma
Frontier Airlines	Las Vegas
Southwest Airlines	Denver, Las Vegas, Los Angeles (begins March 11, 2027), Oakland, Phoenix–Sky Harbor, Sacramento, San Diego, San Jose (CA); Seasonal: Burbank, Chicago–Midway, Dallas–Love, Nashville (begins June 3, 2027)
United Airlines	Denver, San Francisco; Seasonal: Chicago–O'Hare
United Express	Chicago–O'Hare, Denver, San Francisco

=== Destinations map ===
Destinations map
Destinations from Boise Airport
Red = Year-round destination
Green = Seasonal destination
Blue = Future destination

Alaska destinations map
Destinations to the US State of Alaska. Red dots represent year-round destinations; green dots represent seasonal destinations; blue dots represent future destinations.

Hawaii destinations map
Hawaii destinations from BOI
Red = Year-round destination
Green = Seasonal destination
Blue = Future destination

== Statistics ==
=== Top destinations ===
Busiest domestic routes from BOI (April 2025 – March 2026)
Rank	City	Passengers	Carriers
1	Seattle/Tacoma, Washington	375,370	Alaska, Delta
2	Denver, Colorado	357,610	Frontier, Southwest, United
3	Phoenix–Sky Harbor, Arizona	205,510	Alaska, American, Southwest
4	Salt Lake City, Utah	167,670	Delta
5	Las Vegas, Nevada	166,660	Alaska, Southwest
6	Portland, Oregon	141,180	Alaska
7	Dallas/Ft. Worth, Texas	128,010	American
8	Sacramento, California	114,010	Alaska, Southwest
9	San Francisco, California	113,250	Alaska, United
10	Minneapolis/St Paul, Minnesota	108,310	Delta

=== Airline market share ===
Top airlines at BOI (December 2024 – November 2025)
Rank	Airline	Passengers	Share
1	Southwest Airlines	1,342,000	26.07%
2	SkyWest Airlines	1,286,000	24.99%
3	Delta Air Lines	662,000	12.86%
4	Horizon Air	638,000	12.39%
5	United Airlines	448,000	8.71%
—	Other Airlines	771,000	14.98%

=== Annual traffic ===
Annual passenger traffic (enplaned + deplaned) at BOI Airport, 2006 through 2025
Year	Passengers	Year	Passengers
2006	3,289,314	2016	3,230,878
2007	3,365,303	2017	3,513,377
2008	3,185,006	2018	3,871,891
2009	2,795,297	2019	4,111,151
2010	2,805,692	2020	1,973,198
2011	2,781,708	2021	3,607,283
2012	2,609,816	2022	4,496,529
2013	2,612,457	2023	4,752,757
2014	2,753,153	2024	4,990,885
2015	2,978,281	2025	5,229,399

== Accidents and incidents ==
- On June 13, 1961, an Idaho Air National Guard North American F-86L crashed shortly after takeoff; the pilot ejected, was critically injured, and later recovered. The wreckage damage was limited to several acres of grassland fire.
- Ten days later on June 23, 1961, another air guard F-86L was lost, this time while preparing to land, about four miles (6 km) south of the runway. The pilot ejected safely and escaped injury, but the wreckage damaged the mainline tracks of the Union Pacific railroad.
- On June 19, 1970, a Grumman TBM (N7026C) was on fire (engine, cockpit) and attempting to return to the airport when it crashed about three miles (5 km) southeast. A naval aviator and Vietnam War veteran, the pilot bailed out at low altitude, but his parachute failed to deploy, and he was killed.
- On December 28, 1970, a de Havilland DH125 (N36MK) made a controlled flight into terrain (CFIT) about seven miles (11 km) northeast of the airport, at an elevation of approximately 5,700 feet (1,740 m) above sea level. The corporate jet of Morrison Knudsen was returning from Billings, Montana, where four passengers were dropped off. No passengers were on board at the time of the crash, more than an hour after sunset, which killed both experienced pilots.
- On August 1, 1974, a Douglas B-26B (N91354) and a Beechcraft M24R (N2529W) collided on the ground while both were taxiing. The pilot of the light plane was killed, crushed under the bomber after the bomber's nose gear collapsed. The B-26 had just arrived from Twin Falls, over an hour prior to sunset, and was headed for the Boise Interagency Fire Center; badly burned, its pilot was airlifted to Salt Lake City, but succumbed three days later.
- On November 16, 1991, a Cessna 402B (N29517) lost power in its starboard engine shortly after take-off from runway 10L, attempted to return, and crashed a mile (1.6 km) south of the airport, killing the pilot and his daughter, the only passenger. Bound for Pocatello, the air taxi cargo flight occurred over four hours prior to sunrise on Saturday.
- On December 9, 1996, a Douglas C-47A (N75142) of Emery Worldwide crashed east of the airport on emergency approach, killing the only two crew members on board. The aircraft was on a cargo flight to Salt Lake City after sunset when the starboard engine caught fire shortly after take-off from runway 10L and the decision was made to return to Boise.
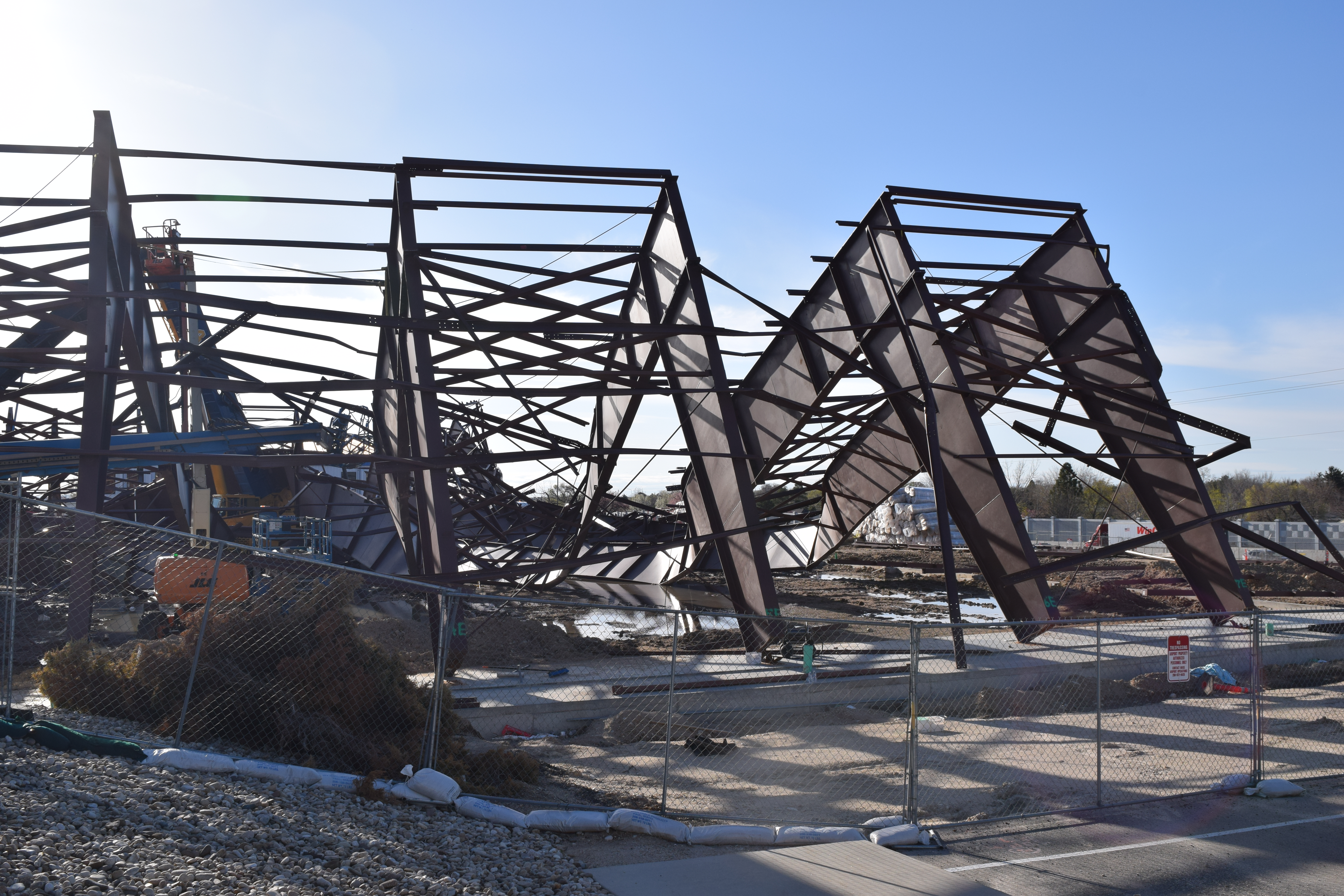
  Collapsed hangar, January 2024
- On February 3, 2012, a Lancair IV-PT turboprop (N321LC) flown by Steve Appleton, CEO of Micron Technology, crashed shortly after take-off from runway 10R, killing the pilot. Attempting an emergency landing, Appleton had aborted an earlier take-off attempt for unknown reasons; the accident was attributed to pilot error.
- On April 9, 2024, Air Canada Flight #997 from Mexico City to Vancouver declared an in-flight emergency and made an unscheduled landing in Boise. Airport staff deboarded the plane and assisted passengers through U.S. Customs, according to the city; border patrol officials were onsite to help assist with proper entry into the United States. The city and the airport have not released what caused the unscheduled landing; no injuries were reported.
- On November 8, 2025, a Kitfox Series 7 Super Sport experimental aircraft (N14PM) from Twin Falls crashed on short final approach to runway 10L. The aircraft was piloted by Michael Verzwyvelt and crashed into the intersection of North Orchard Street and West Victory Road, approximately a half-mile (800 m) short of the runway, causing significant damage to the aircraft. Both the pilot and the one passenger onboard were hospitalized due to minor injuries but survived the Saturday evening crash, which occurred more than an hour after sunset. After the crash, Boise Police suspected Verzwyvelt of flying intoxicated after finding his blood alcohol content to be 0.213%. On March 6, 2026, Verzwyvelt changed his plea to guilty of flying under the influence, a misdemeanor; he was sentenced to 90 days in the Ada County Jail and must pay $50,730 within two years.
