= O'Hare International Airport =

Airport serving Chicago, Illinois, United States

Chicago O'Hare International Airport

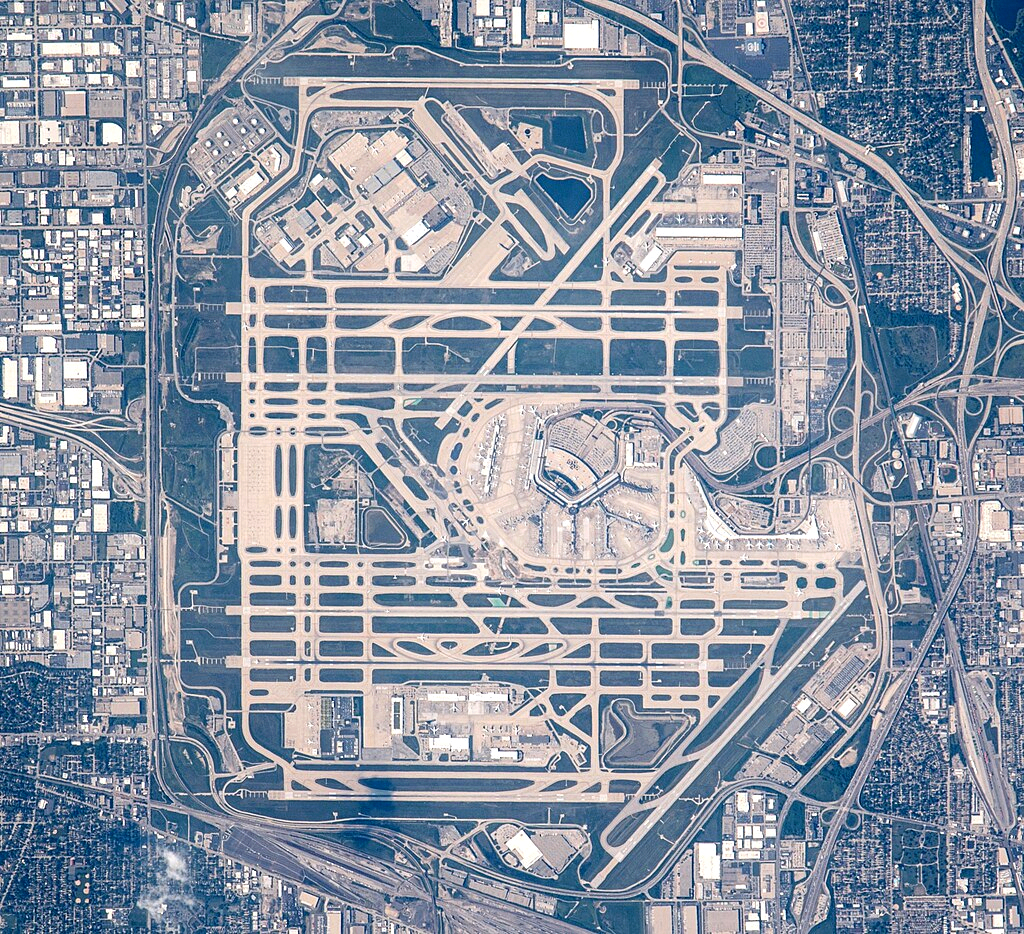
- Satellite image of O'Hare in August 2023.
- IATA: ORD; ICAO: KORD; FAA LID: ORD; WMO: 72530

Summary
- Airport type: Public
- Owner/Operator: Chicago Department of Aviation
- Serves: Chicago metropolitan area
- Location: O'Hare, Chicago, Illinois, U.S.
- Opened: February 1944; 82 years ago
- Hub for: American Airlines; United Airlines; Atlas Air
- Focus city for: Polar Air Cargo
- Operating base for: Frontier Airlines
- Time zone: CST (UTC−06:00)
  - Summer (DST): CDT (UTC−05:00)
- Elevation AMSL: 204 m (669 ft)
- Coordinates: 41°58′43″N 87°54′17″W
- Public transit access: Blue at O'Hare; NCS at O'Hare Transfer
- Website: flychicago.com/ohare

Maps
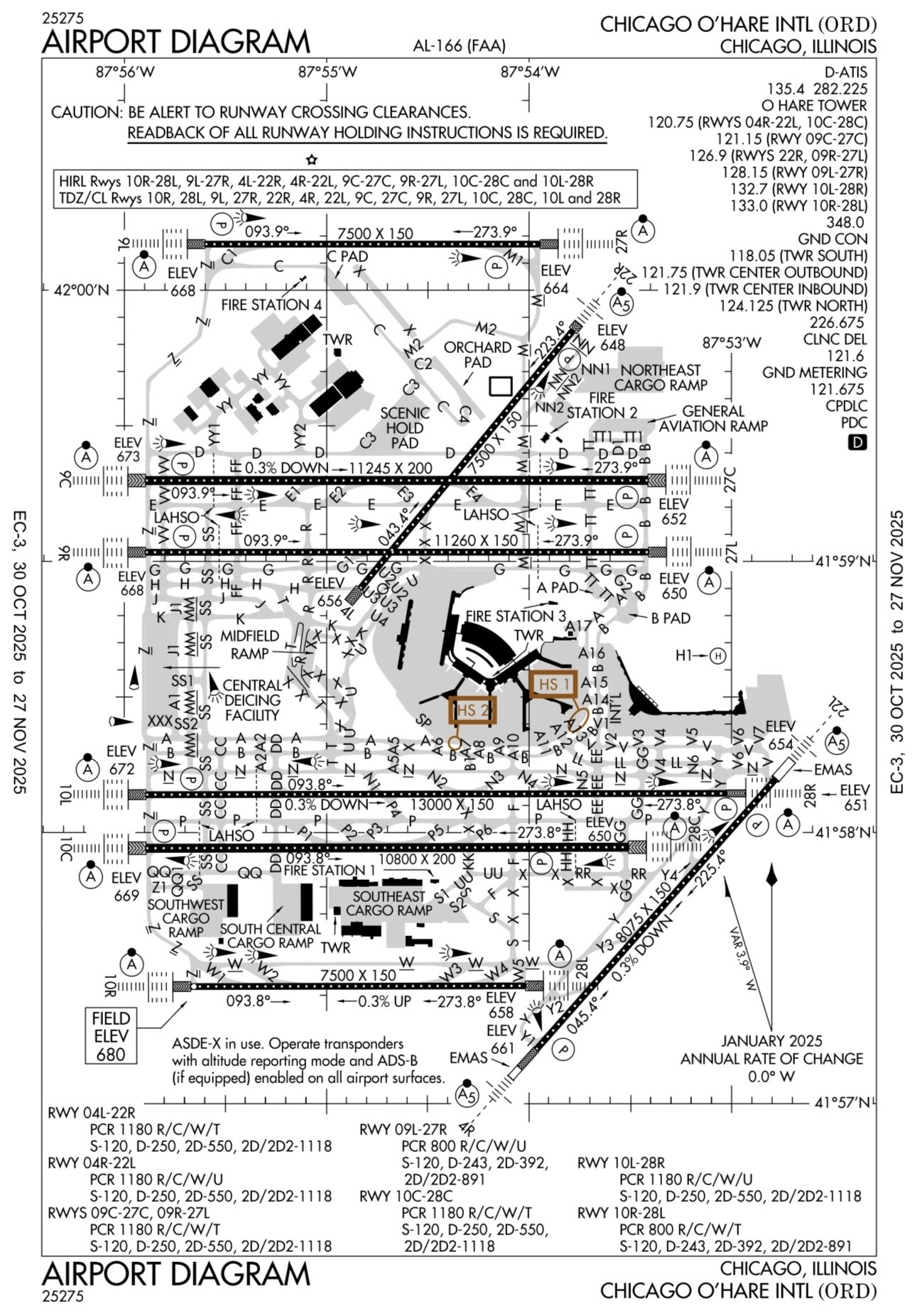
- Interactive map of Chicago O'Hare International Airport

Runways
Direction	Length		Surface
Direction	m	ft	Surface
4L/22R	2,286	7,500	Concrete
4R/22L	2,461	8,075	Concrete
9L/27R	2,286	7,500	Concrete
9C/27C	3,427	11,245	Concrete
9R/27L	3,432	11,260	Concrete
10L/28R	3,962	13,000	Concrete
10C/28C	3,292	10,800	Concrete
10R/28L	2,286	7,500	Concrete

Helipads
Number	Length		Surface
Number	m	ft	Surface
H1	61	200	Concrete

Statistics (2025)
- Passenger volume: 84,851,825
- Rank (world): 6th
- Aircraft movements: 857,392
- Cargo (metric tons): 2,231,089
- Employees: 1,831
- Source: O'Hare International Airport

Chicago O'Hare International Airport (IATA: ORD, ICAO: KORD, FAA LID: ORD) is a primary international airport serving Chicago, Illinois, United States, located on the city's Northwest Side, approximately 17 miles (27 km) northwest of downtown. The airport is operated by the Chicago Department of Aviation and covers 7,627 acres (11.92 sq mi; 30.87 km^{2}). It has eight runways, the most of any airport in the world.

Designed to be the successor to Chicago Midway International Airport, itself once nicknamed the "busiest square mile in the world", O'Hare began as an airfield serving a Douglas manufacturing plant for C-54 military transports during World War II. It was renamed Orchard Field Airport in the mid-1940s and assigned the IATA code ORD. In 1949, it was renamed after aviator Edward "Butch" O'Hare, the U.S. Navy's first Medal of Honor recipient during World War II. As the first major airport planned after World War II, O'Hare's innovative design pioneered concepts such as concourses, direct highway access to the terminal, jet bridges, and underground refueling systems.

O'Hare became famous during the jet age, holding the distinction as the world's busiest airport by passenger traffic from 1963 to 1998. It still ranks as one of the busiest airports in the world, according to the Airports Council International rankings. In 2025, O'Hare had more than 857,000 aircraft movements, averaging 2,340 per day, the most of any airport in the world. O'Hare has non-stop flights to 249 destinations in North America, South America, the Caribbean, Europe, Africa, Asia, Oceania, the Middle East and the North Atlantic region as of summer 2024. As of 2024, O'Hare is considered the most connected airport in the United States, and fifth most connected airport in the world.

On the ground, road access to the airport is offered by airport shuttle, bus, the Chicago "L", or taxis. The Kennedy Expressway goes directly into the airport. O'Hare is a hub for American Airlines and United Airlines (which is headquartered in Willis Tower), as well as an operating base for Frontier Airlines.

== History ==
ORD Airport Diagram before its major runway layout change, with 9 runways instead of the current 8 runways.

=== Establishment and defense efforts ===
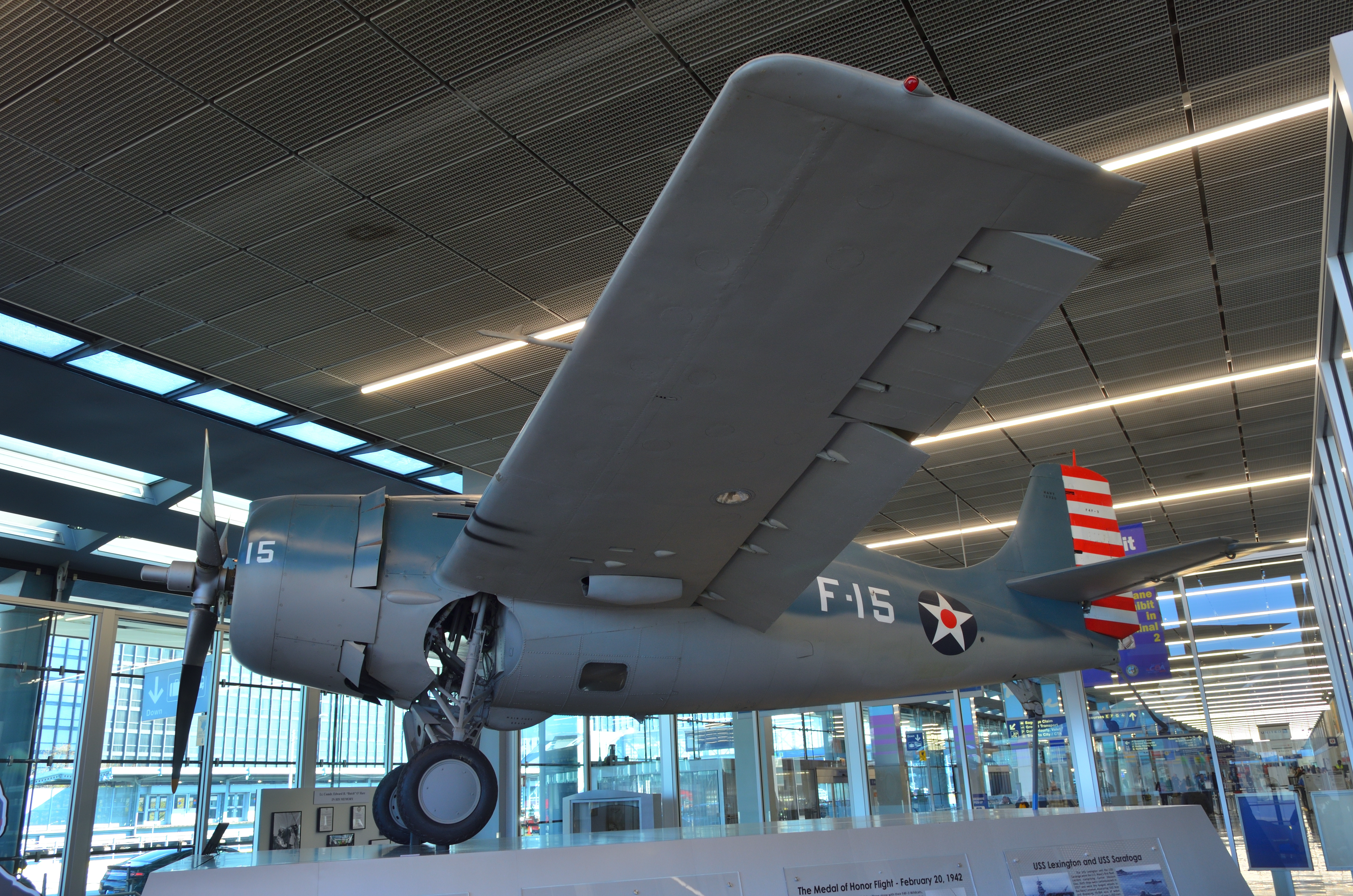
Grumman F4F-3 Wildcat on display in O'Hare's Terminal 2, restored in the markings of "Butch" O'Hare's plane

Soon after the opening of Chicago Municipal Airport in 1926, the City of Chicago realized more airport capacity would be needed. The city government investigated various sites in the 1930s but made little progress before America's entry into World War II.

O'Hare began as a manufacturing plant for Douglas C-54 Skymasters during World War II and the adjoining, 4 runway Douglas Field Airport. The site was originally known as a small German-American farming community known as Orchard Place. The 2 million square feet (190,000 m^{2}) plant, in the northeast corner of what is now the airport, needed easy access to the workforce of Chicago—the nation's second-largest city at the time, as well as needing railroads and location far from enemy threat. 655 C-54s were built at the plant, more than half of all produced. The airfield, from which the C-54s flew out, was known as Douglas Airport; initially, it had four 5,500-foot (1,700 m) runways. This was also the location of the Army Air Force's 803rd Specialized Depot, a unit charged with storing many captured enemy aircraft; a few representatives of this collection would eventually be transferred to the Smithsonian Institution's National Air and Space Museum.

Douglas Company's contract ended with the war's conclusion. Douglas considered building airliners at Orchard but chose to concentrate civil production at its headquarters in Santa Monica, California. With the departure of Douglas, the complex took the name Orchard (Douglas) Airport, and was assigned the IATA code ORD. The only remaining building of the Douglas Aircraft Factory is the Administration building now used by the City of Chicago, Department of Aviation along with 2 of the original 4 runways.

The United States Air Force used the old Douglas Field apron extensively during the Korean War; the airport then had no scheduled airline service. Although not its primary base in the area, the Air Force used O'Hare as a fighter base; it was home to the 62nd Fighter-Interceptor Squadron flying North American F-86 Sabres from 1950 to 1959. By 1960, the need for O'Hare as an active duty fighter base was diminishing, just as commercial business was picking up at the airport. The Air Force removed active-duty units from O'Hare and turned the station over to Continental Air Command, enabling them to base reserve and Air National Guard units there. As a result of a 1993 agreement between the City and the Department of Defense, the reserve base was closed on April 1, 1997, ending its career as the home of the 928th Airlift Wing and of the 126th Air Refueling Wing in 1999. At that time, the remaining 357-acre (144 ha) site came under the ownership of the Chicago Department of Aviation and made way for the O'Hare Modernization Plan (OMP).

=== Early commercial development ===
In 1945, Chicago mayor Edward Kelly established a board to choose the site of a new airport to meet future demand. After considering various proposals, the board decided upon the Orchard Field site and acquired most of the federal government property in March 1946. The military retained a small parcel of property on the site and the right to use 25% of the airfield's operating capacity for free.

Ralph H. Burke devised an airport master plan based on the pioneering idea of what he called "split finger terminals", allowing a terminal building to be attached to "airline wings" (concourses), each providing space for gates and planes. (Pre-war airport designs had favored ever-larger single terminals, exemplified by Berlin's Tempelhof.) Burke's design also included underground refueling, direct highway access to the front of terminals, and direct rail access from downtown, all of which are utilized at airports worldwide today. O'Hare was the site of the world's first jet bridge in 1958, and successfully adapted slip form paving, developed for the nation's new Interstate highway system, for seamless concrete runways.

In 1949, the City renamed the facility O'Hare Airport to honor Edward "Butch" O'Hare, the U.S. Navy's first flying ace and Medal of Honor recipient in World War II. However, its IATA code (ORD) remained unchanged, resulting in O'Hare being one of the few IATA codes bearing no connection to the airport's name or metropolitan area.

=== Arrival of passenger service and subsequent growth ===
Scheduled passenger service began in 1955, but growth was slow at first. Although Chicago had invested over $25 million in O'Hare, Midway remained the world's busiest airport and airlines were reluctant to move until highway access and other improvements were completed. The April 1957 Official Airline Guide listed 36 weekday departures from O'Hare, while Midway had 414. Improvements began to attract the airlines: O'Hare's first international terminal opened in August 1958, and by April 1959 the airport had expanded to 7,200 acres (11.3 sq mi; 29 km^{2}) with new hangars, terminals, parking and other facilities. The expressway link to downtown Chicago, now known as the Kennedy Expressway, was completed in 1960. New Terminals 2 and 3, designed by C. F. Murphy and Associates, opened on January 1, 1962.

The biggest factor driving airlines to relocate their operations from Midway to O'Hare was the jet airliner; the first scheduled jet at O'Hare was an American 707 from New York to Chicago to San Francisco on March 22, 1959. Midway, a mile (1.6 km) square, had no space for the runways that 707s and DC-8s required. Airlines had been reluctant to move to O'Hare, but they naturally did not want to split their operations: in July 1962, the last fixed-wing scheduled airline flight in Chicago moved from Midway to O'Hare. Until United returned in July 1964, Midway's only scheduled airline was Chicago Helicopter Airways. The arrival of Midway's traffic quickly made O'Hare the world's busiest airport, serving 10 million passengers annually. Within two years, that number would double, with Chicagoans boasting that more people passed through O'Hare in 12 months than Ellis Island had processed in its entire existence. O'Hare remained the world's busiest airport until it was eclipsed by Hartsfield-Jackson Atlanta International Airport in 1998.

O'Hare had four runways in 1955; The 8,000 ft (2,400 m) runway 14R/32L opened in 1956 and was extended to 11,600 feet (3,500 m) a few years later, allowing nonstops to Europe. Runway 9R/27L (now 10L/28R) opened in 1968 and runway 4R/22L in 1971.

=== Post-deregulation developments ===
In the 1980s, after passage of US airline deregulation, the first major change at O'Hare occurred when TWA left Chicago for St. Louis as its main mid-continent hub. Although TWA had a large hangar complex at O'Hare and had started Constellation nonstops to Paris in 1958, by the time of deregulation its operation was losing $25 million a year under competition from United and American. Northwest likewise ceded O'Hare to the competition and shifted to a Minneapolis/St. Paul and Detroit-centered network by the early 1990s after acquiring Republic Airlines in 1986. Delta maintained an O'Hare hub for some time, even commissioning a new Concourse L in 1983. Ultimately, Delta found competing from an inferior position at O'Hare too expensive and closed its Chicago hub in the 1990s, concentrating its upper Midwest operations at Cincinnati.

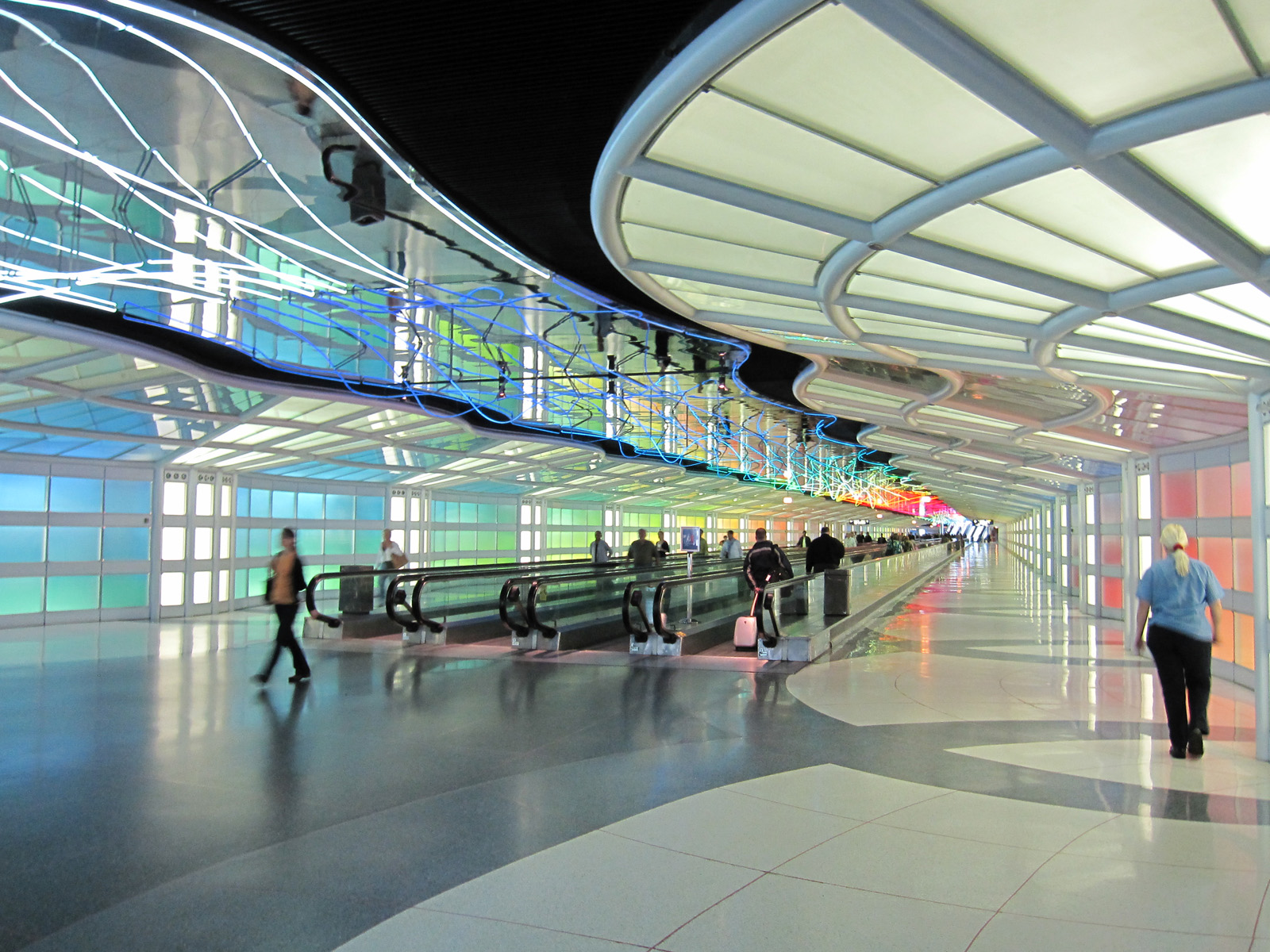
The Terminal 1 underground tunnel connects Concourses B and C.

The dominant hubs established at O'Hare in the 1980s by United and American continue to operate today. United developed a new two-concourse Terminal 1 (dubbed "The Terminal for Tomorrow"), designed by Helmut Jahn. It was built between 1985 and 1987 on the site of the original Terminal 1; the structure, which includes 50 gates, is best known for its curved glass forms and the connecting underground tunnel between Concourses B and C. The tunnel is illuminated with a neon installation titled Sky's the Limit (1987) by Canadian artist Michael Hayden, which plays an airy, slow-tempo version of Rhapsody in Blue. American renovated and expanded its existing facilities in Terminal 3 from 1987 to 1990; those renovations feature a flag-lined entrance hall to Concourses H/K.

The demolition of the original Terminal 1 in 1984 to make way for Jahn's design forced a "temporary" relocation of international flights into facilities called "Terminal 4" on the ground floor of the airport's central parking garage. International passengers were then transferred by bus to and from their aircraft. Relocation finally ended with the completion of the 21-gate International Terminal in 1993 (now called Terminal 5); it contains all customs facilities. Its location, on the site of the original cargo area and east of the terminal core, necessitated the construction of a peoplemover, which connected the terminal core with the new terminal as well as remote rental and parking lots.

Following deregulation and the buildup of the American and United hubs, O'Hare faced increasing delays from the late 1980s onward due to its inefficient runway layout; the airfield had remained unchanged since the addition of its last new runway (4R/22L) in 1971. O'Hare's three pairs of angled runways were meant to allow takeoffs into the wind, but they came at a cost: the various intersecting runways were both dangerous and inefficient. Official reports at the end of the 1990s ranked O'Hare as one of the worst-performing airports in the United States based on the percentage of delayed flights. In 2001, the Chicago Department of Aviation committed to an O'Hare Modernization Plan (OMP). Initially estimated at $6.6 billion, the OMP was to be paid by bonds issued against the increase in the federal passenger facility charge enacted that year and federal airport improvement funds. The modernization plan was approved by the FAA in October 2005 and involved a complete reconfiguration of the airfield. The OMP included the construction of four new runways, lengthening two existing runways, and decommissioning three old runways to provide O'Hare with six parallel runways and two crosswind runways.

In August 2025, the city broke ground on the first satellite concourse, designated Concourse D, as the initial phase of ORDNext, the active stage of the O'Hare 21 program. The 590,000-square-foot, 19-gate facility is designed by Skidmore, Owings & Merrill in collaboration with Ross Barney Architects, Juan Gabriel Moreno Architects, and Arup. AECOM Hunt Clayco Bowa serves as construction manager for the $1.45 billion project, which is scheduled for completion in late 2028.

The OMP was the subject of legal battles, both with suburbs who feared the new layout's noise implications as well as with survivors of persons interred in a cemetery the city proposed to relocate; some of the cases were not resolved until 2011. These issues, plus the reduction in traffic as a result of the Great Recession, delayed the OMP's completion; construction of the sixth and final parallel runway (9C/27C) began in 2016. Its completion in 2020, along with an extension of runway 9R/27L completed in 2021, concluded the OMP.

=== Expansion ===
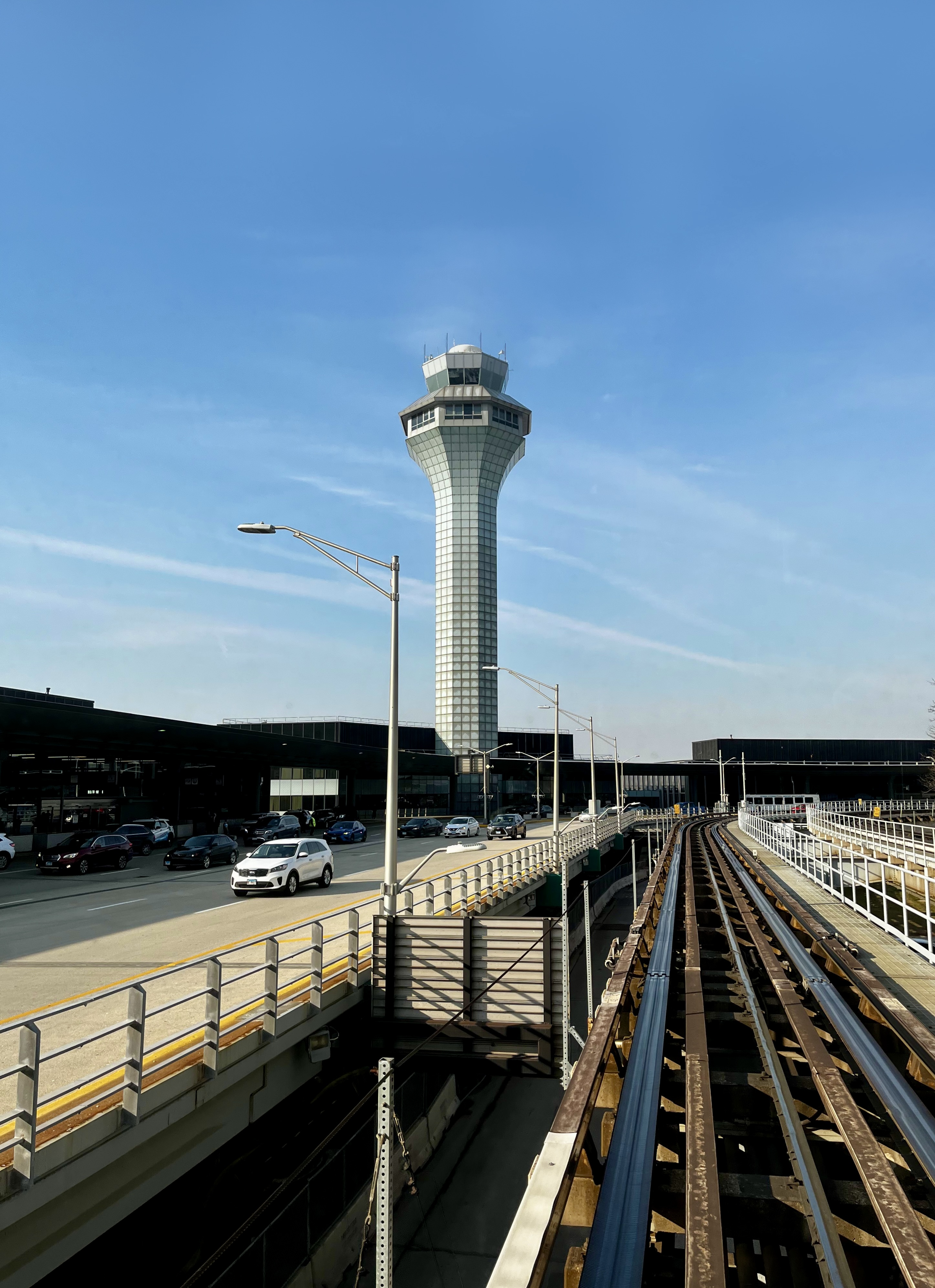
Control tower and Terminals 3 and 2 seen from ATS (Airport Transit System)

In 2018, the city and airlines committed to Phase I of a new Terminal Area Plan dubbed O'Hare 21. The plan calls for two all-new satellite concourses to the southwest of Concourse C, and to expand Terminals 2 and 5 with additional gates, lounges, and updates to operations all over the airport. (Terminal 5 has ten new gates in addition to its newly expanded facilities, plus two additional gates to each accommodate an Airbus A380.) The expansion will enable same-terminal transfers between international and domestic flights, faster connections, improved facilities and technology for TSA and customs inspections and much larger landside amenities such as shopping and restaurants. A principal feature of the plan is the reorganization of the terminal core into an "alliance hub," the first in North America; airside connections and layout will be optimized around airline alliances. This will be made possible by the construction of the O'Hare Global Terminal (OGT) where Terminal 2 currently stands. The OGT and two new satellite concourses will allow for expansion for both American's and United's international operations as well as easy interchange with their respective Oneworld (American) and Star Alliance (United) partner carriers, eliminating the need to transfer to Terminal 5.

The project will add over 3 million square feet (280,000 m^{2}) to the airport's terminals, add a new customs processing center in the OGT, reconstruct gates and concourses (new concourses will be a minimum of 150 feet (46 m) wide), increase the gate count from 185 to 235, and provide 25% more ramp space at every gate throughout the airport to accommodate larger aircraft. After an international design competition that featured public voting on five final architectural proposals, the Studio ORD group, led by architect Jeanne Gang (in collaboration with SCB, Corgan, Milhouse, and STL Architect), was selected to design the OGT, while Skidmore, Owings & Merrill LLP will design Satellites 1 and 2. By terms of the agreement, total costs of $8.5 billion for the project are to be borne by bonds issued by the city, which will be retired by airport usage fees paid by airlines. O'Hare 21 is scheduled for completion of the satellite concourse D in 2028, and overall completion in 2030.

By November 2023, the project's cost had ballooned far over budget, leading both American Airlines and United Airlines to call for the global terminal project to be cancelled or scaled back. On May 3, 2024, American Airlines and United Airlines were able to reach an agreement with the City of Chicago to allow the project to continue. In the agreement, the replacement of Terminal 2 would be accelerated, while the addition of Satellite 2 concourse would be delayed. The replacement of Terminal 2 with the OGT was deemed more critical to complete first instead of the Satellite 2 concourse. The design of Satellite 1 concourse was presented to the public on May 29, 2024, it was planned to complete Satellite 1 concourse by 2028.

== Facilities ==
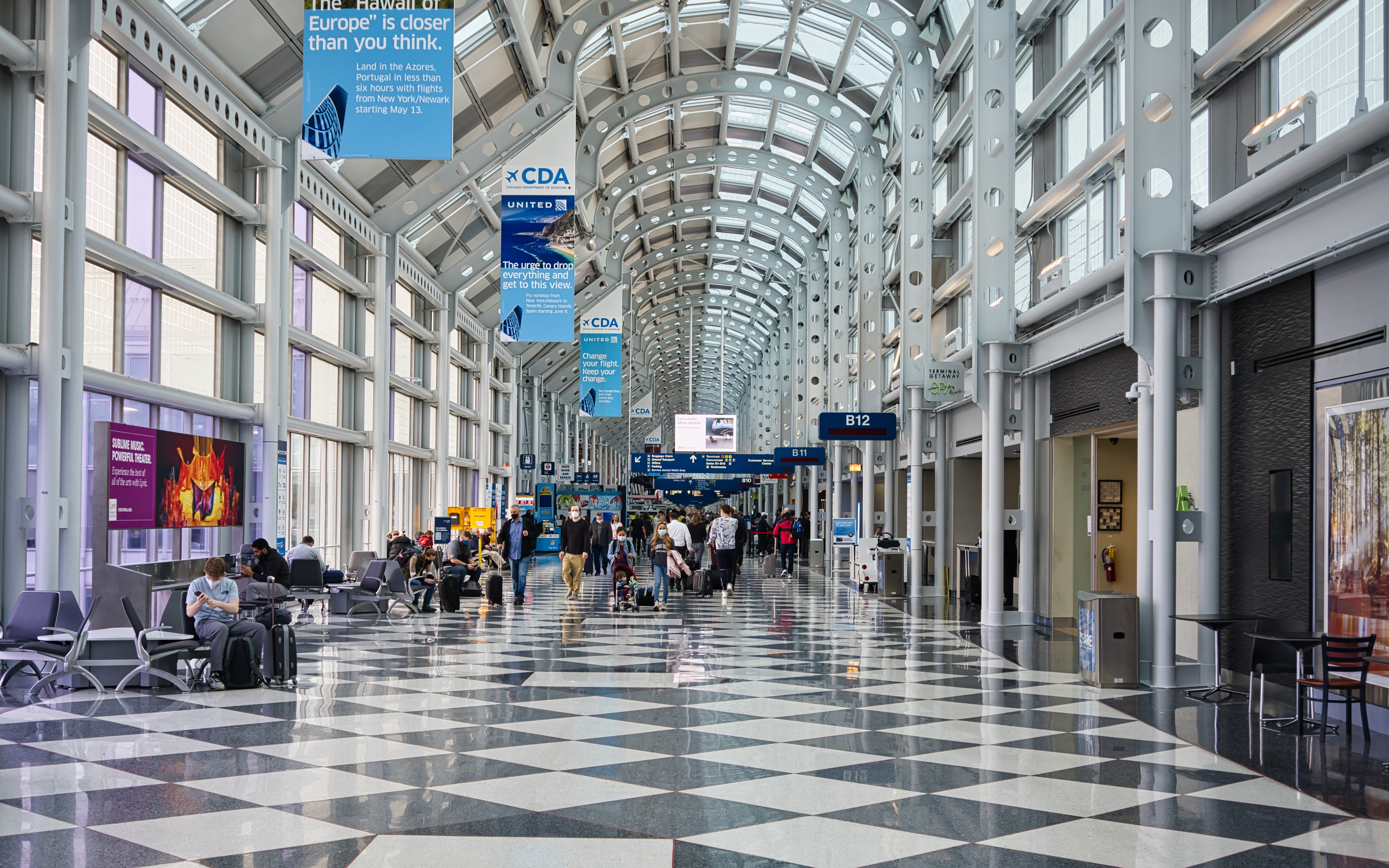
United Airlines Terminal 1, Concourse B

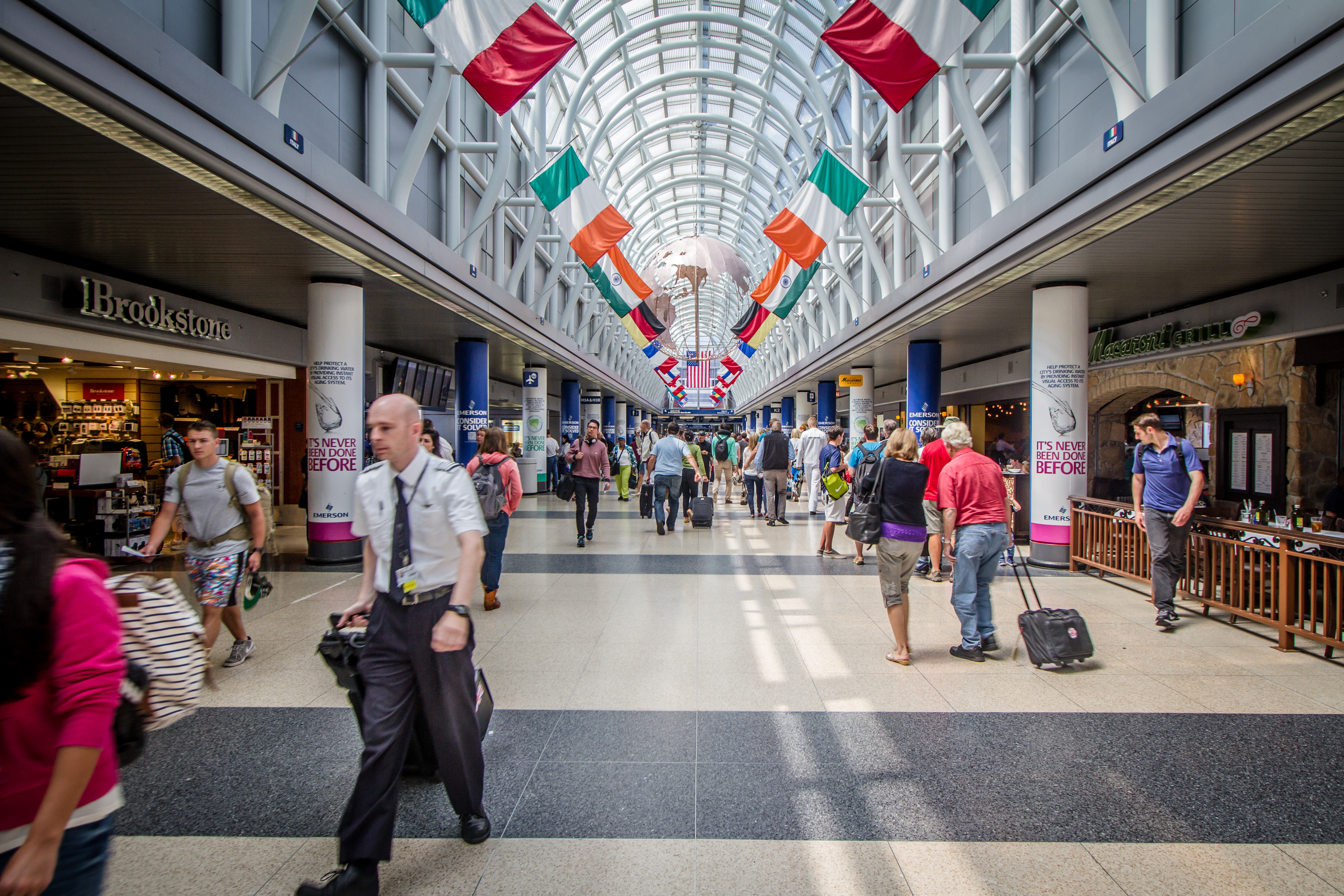
American Airlines Terminal 3 main hall

=== Terminals ===
O'Hare has four numbered passenger terminals with nine lettered concourses and a total of 215 gates.

	Number of gates	Concourses	Airlines	Notes
Terminal 1	52	Two (B, C)	United Airlines, Lufthansa, All Nippon Airways	Concourses connected by underground tunnel.
Terminal 2	41	Two (E, F)	United Express, Air Canada, JetBlue, some United Airlines	
Terminal 3	80	Four (G, H, K, L)	American Airlines, Alaska Airlines, Aer Lingus, British Airways, Iberia, Japan Airlines, some United Airlines	
Terminal 5	35	One (M)	Delta Air Lines, Frontier Airlines	Contains the U.S. Customs and Border Protection facilities of the airport; processes non-precleared international arrivals. Used by all international airlines that do not depart from Terminals 1–3 3 gates sized to accommodate an Airbus A380.

Terminals 1–3 are connected airside via a walkway. Terminal 5 is separated from the others by taxiways and does not have a walkway between it and Terminals 1–3; passengers transferring between Terminal 5 and the others can only do so landside via a shuttle bus or the Airport Transit System, requiring rescreening at security, or via an airside shuttle bus that runs between Terminal 5 and Terminals 1 and 3 every 15 minutes from 11:30 am to 9:30 pm.

=== Runways ===
O'Hare has two sets of parallel runways, one on either side of the terminal complex. Each airfield has three parallel east–west runways (9L/27R, 9C/27C, and 9R/27L on the north side; 10L/28R, 10C/28C, and 10R/28L on the south side) and a crosswind runway oriented northeast–southwest (4L/22R on the north, 4R/22L on the south). The north crosswind runway, 4L/22R, sees limited usage due to intersecting 9R/27L and 9C/27C; however, runway 22L is often used for takeoffs during what is called "west flow" on the main runways. The airfield is managed by three FAA air traffic control towers. O'Hare has a voluntary nighttime (22:00–07:00) noise abatement program.

Runway 18/36 was closed in 2001, and converted into what is now taxiway M. In 2015, runway 32R/14L was permanently closed after 72 years of service, in favor of the new runway 10R/28L. In 2019, runway 32L/14R was also closed.

Currently, O'Hare has the most runways of any civilian airport in the world, totaling eight.

=== Hotel ===
The Hilton Chicago O'Hare is between the terminal core and parking garage and is currently the only hotel on airport property. It is owned by the Chicago Department of Aviation and operated under an agreement with Hilton Hotels, who extended their agreement with the city by ten years in 2018.

=== Cargo facilities ===
There are presently two main cargo areas at O'Hare. The South Cargo Area was relocated in the 1980s from the airport's first air cargo facilities, located east of the terminal core, where Terminal 5 now stands. Many of the structures in this new cargo area then had to be rebuilt, again, to allow for the OMP and specifically runway 10R/28L; as a result, what is now called the South Cargo Area is located between 10R/28L and 10C/28C. This large collection of facilities, in three sections (Southwest, South Central, and Southeast), was established mainly by traditional airline-based air cargo; Air France Cargo, American, JAL Cargo, KLM, Lufthansa Cargo, Northwest and United all built purpose-built, freestanding cargo facilities, although some of these are now leased out to dedicated cargo firms. In addition, the area contains two separate facilities for shipper FedEx and one for UPS.

The Northeast Cargo Area (NEC) is a conversion of the former military base (the Douglas plant area) at the northeast corner of the airport property. It is a new facility designed to increase O'Hare's cargo capacity by 50%. Two buildings currently make up the NEC: a 540,000 square feet (50,000 m^{2}) building completed in 2016, and a 240,000 square feet (22,000 m^{2}) building that was completed in 2017. A third structure will complete the NEC with another 150,000 square feet (14,000 m^{2}) of warehouse space.

The current capability of the cargo areas provide 2 million square feet (190,000 m^{2}) of airside cargo space with parking for 40 wide-body freighters matched with over 2 million square feet (190,000 m^{2}) of landside warehousing capability. O'Hare shipped over 1,700,000 tonnes (1,900,000 short tons) in 2018, fifth among airports in the U.S.

=== Other facilities ===
In 2011, O'Hare became the first major airport to build an apiary on its property; every summer, it hosts as many as 75 hives and a million bees. The bees are maintained by 30 to 40 ex-offenders with little to no work experience and few marketable skills; they are primarily recruited from Chicago's North Lawndale neighborhood. They are taught beekeeping but also benefit from the bees' labor, turning it into bottled fresh honey, soaps, lip balms, candles and moisturizers marketed under the beelove product line. More than 500 persons have completed the program, transferring to jobs in manufacturing, food processing, customer service, and hospitality; the repeat-offender rate is reported to be less than 10%.

The CDA's Airport Airfield Operations section is based out of the 150 ft (50 m) tall prototype tower architect I.M. Pei designed for the FAA in the 1960s-1970s.

Resthaven Cemetery, which predates the airport, is situated across from the FedEx facility. Over 300 people are interred at Resthaven, which was allowed to remain on the airport grounds post-OMP while another cemetery, St. Johannes, had to be relocated.

=== Law enforcement ===
Law enforcement at O'Hare International Airport is handled primarily by the Airport Operations section of the Chicago Police Department. In addition to patrol officers, Airport Operations include a SWAT team, canine handlers, detective investigators, and bomb squad specialists. In 2020, a new police station was opened in Terminal 5 with expanded office space, specialized training areas, modern locker rooms, and secure detainee processing facilities.

In addition to the CPD, O'Hare also employs unarmed Aviation Security Officers (ASO) who monitor access points to secure areas of the airport and enforce other federal regulatory requirements. Both the CPD and the ASOs operate alongside federal partners, including the Transportation Security Administration (TSA) and U.S. Customs and Border Protection (CBP).

Following a highly controversial incident on April 9, 2017, when Kentucky doctor David Dao was seriously injured as he was forcibly removed from an oversold United Express flight by what were then known as Chicago Aviation Police, the latter were stripped of their police title, reclassified as Aviation Security Officers and prohibited from boarding aircraft except in instances of imminent danger. The union representing the ASOs filed a federal class action lawsuit in 2018 over a perceived loss of employment benefits enjoyed by law enforcement officers by some of the now reclassified security guards. The lawsuit was eventually dismissed in September 2021, and was appealed to the Seventh Circuit in September 2022. The Seventh Circuit affirmed the lower court decision in January 2023.

== Ground transportation ==
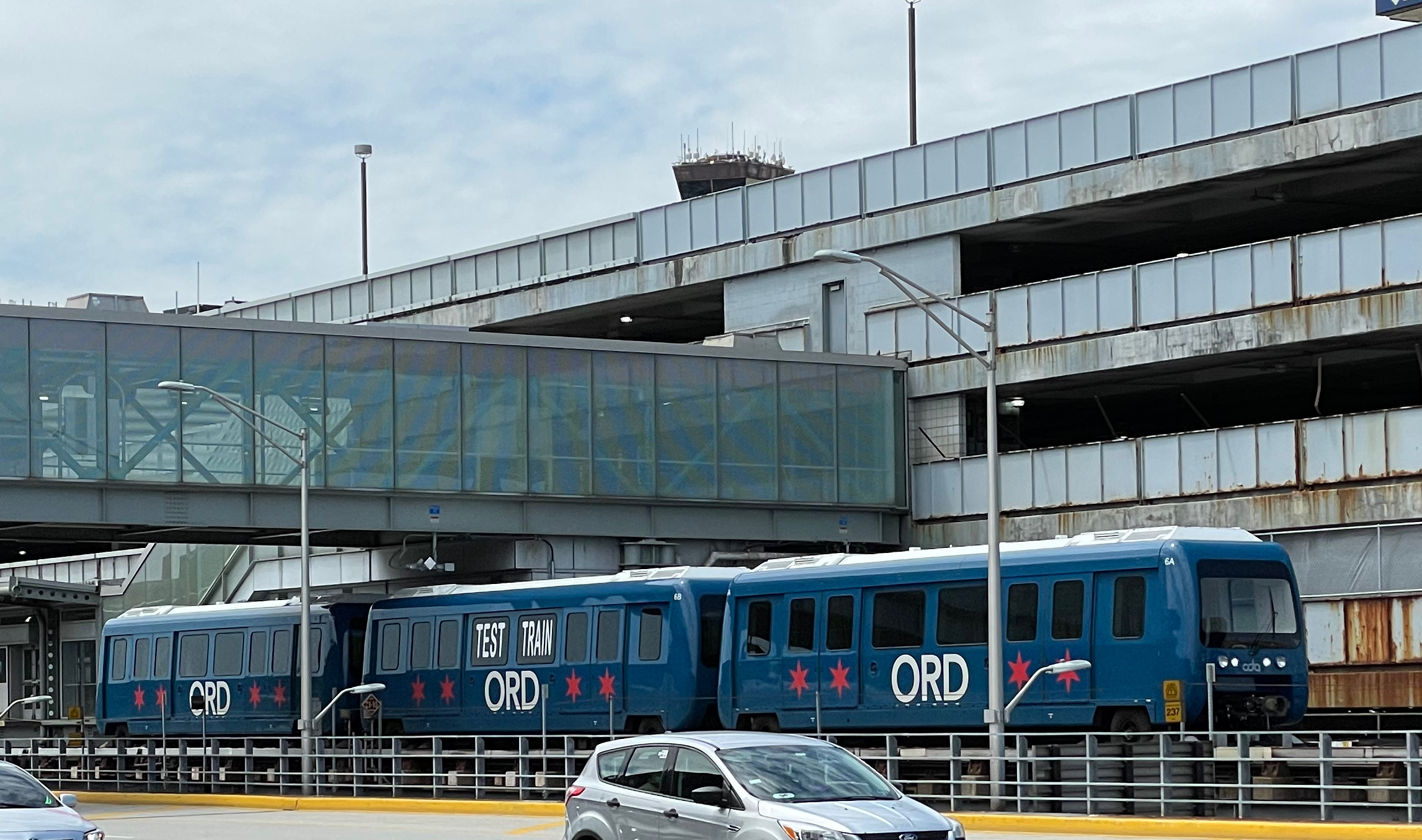
Airport Transit System

=== Airport Transit System ===
The Airport Transit System (ATS) shuttles passengers between the terminal core (Terminals 1–3), Terminal 5, and the O'Hare Multi-Modal Facility (MMF). The system, which re-opened on November 3, 2021, resumed round-the-clock service starting at 5 a.m. on April 18, 2022, after a nearly six-year renovation. Meanwhile, free shuttle buses also continue to run 24/7 and contribute to congestion, boarding on the upper (departures) level of all terminals. The Bus Shuttle center, located on the ground level of the parking garage between Terminals 1–3 and directly opposite the Hilton Hotel, provides a temporary boarding location for local hotel shuttles and regional public transport buses.

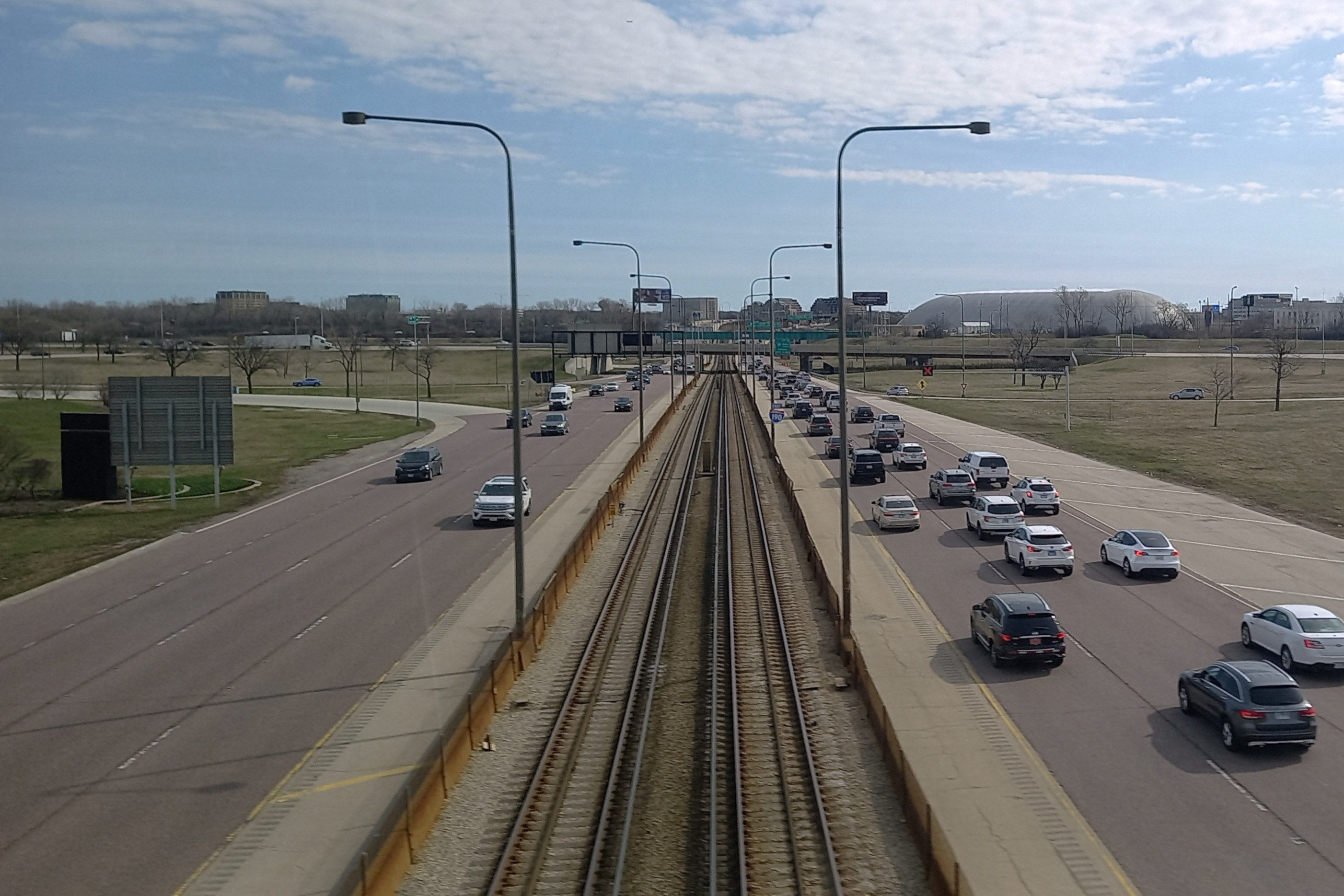
Interstate 190

=== Car ===
==== Rental cars ====
The O'Hare Multi-Modal Facility is the home of all on-airport car rental firms as well as some extended parking.

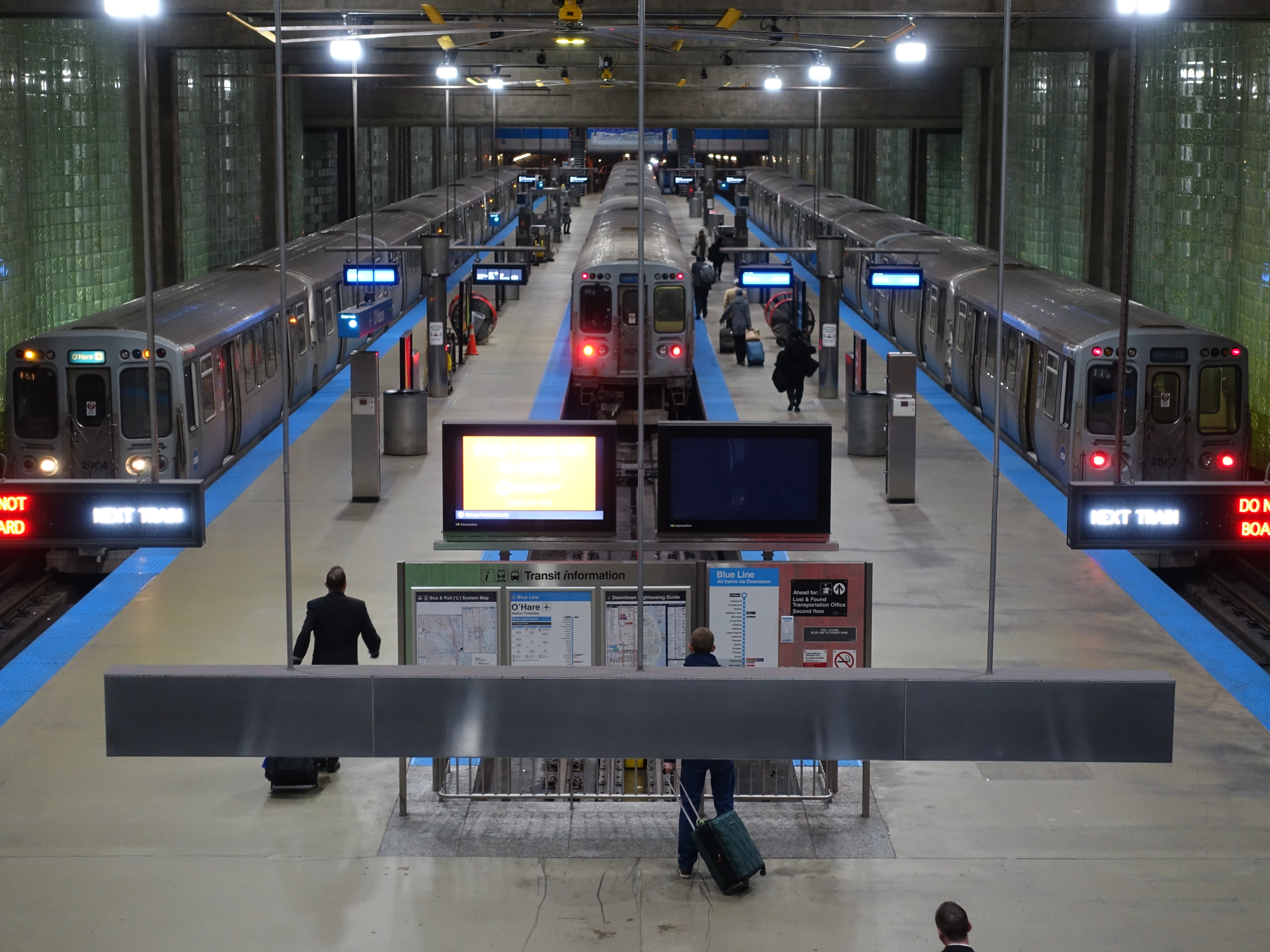
CTA O'Hare Station

=== Train ===
==== CTA "L" Blue Line ====
The CTA Blue Line's north terminus is at O'Hare and provides direct service to downtown via the Milwaukee–Dearborn subway in the Loop and continuing to west suburban Forest Park. Trains depart at intervals ranging from every four to thirty minutes, 24 hours a day. The station is located on the lower level of the parking garage, and can be accessed directly from Terminals 1–3 via tunnel and from Terminal 5 via shuttle bus or the ATS.

==== Metra commuter rail ====
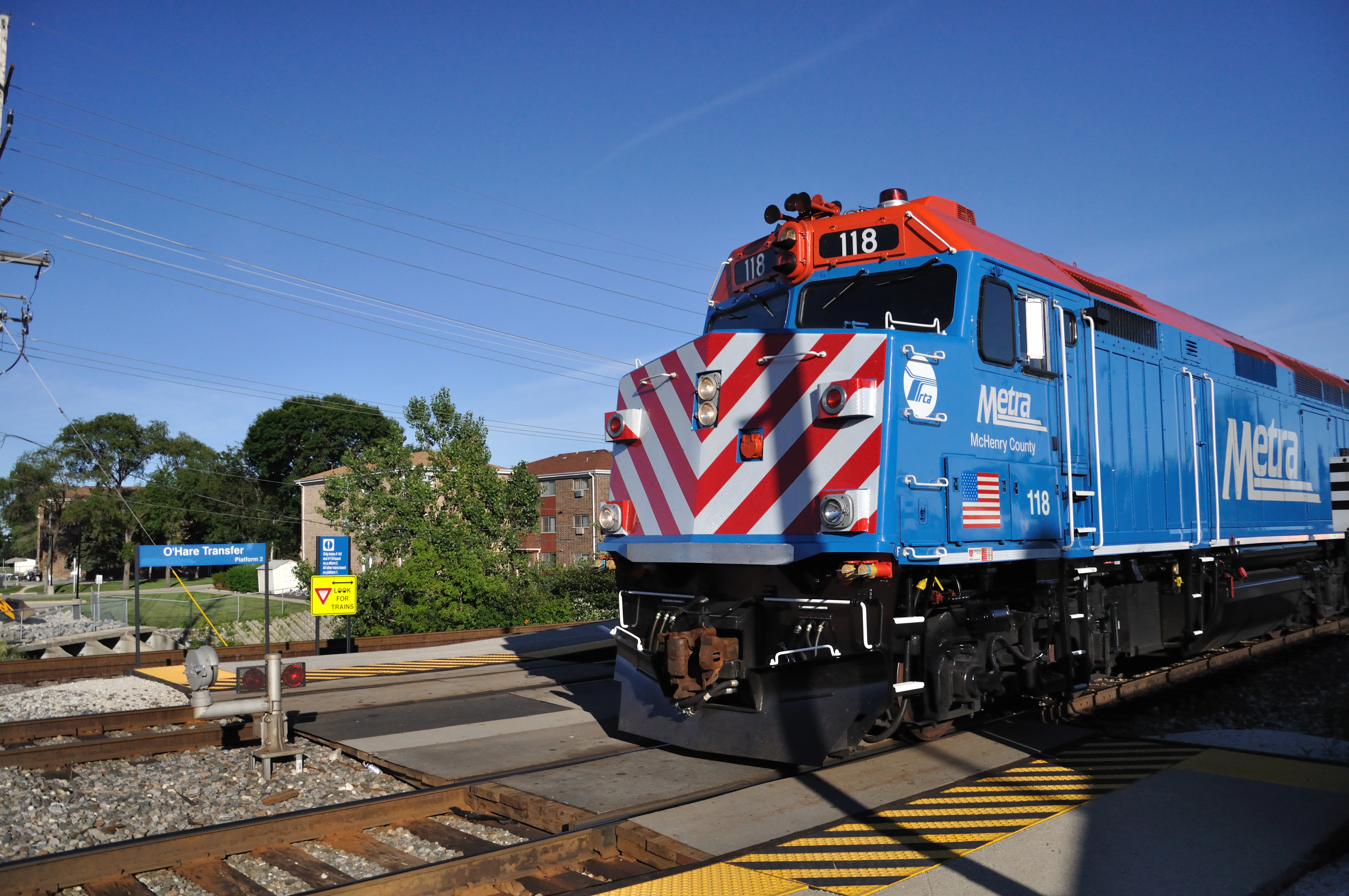
Metra O'Hare Transfer station (limited service)

Metra, the Chicago-area commuter rail system, has a transfer station on its North Central Service (NCS) located at the northeast corner of the O'Hare Multi-Modal Facility (MMF). The NCS provides service to downtown at Chicago Union Station (which provides connections to Amtrak trains and other Metra trains) and north to Antioch, Illinois via various northern suburbs. However, the NCS currently operates peak-direction service on weekdays and there is no service on weekends or holidays.

Pace buses connect to other, more well-served Metra stations. The Pulse Dempster Line connects to the Des Plaines station on the Union Pacific Northwest Line (UP-NW) and the Evanston/Davis Street station on the Union Pacific North Line (UP-N). Route 330 connects to the LaGrange Road station on the BNSF Line and Amtrak Illinois Zephyr/Carl Sandburg services.

=== Bus ===
==== Pace suburban bus ====
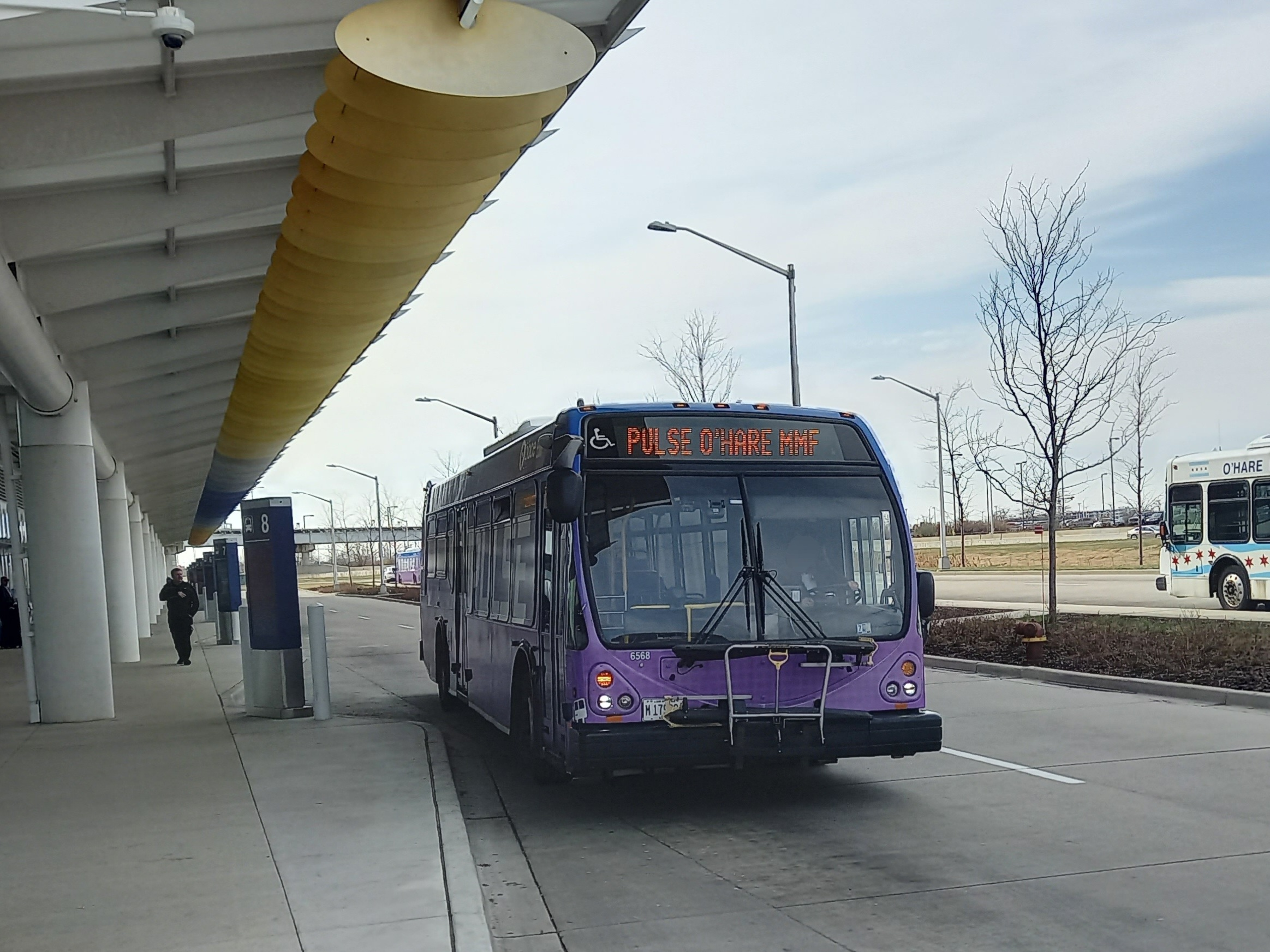
Pace Pulse Dempster bus at the Multi-Modal Facility

Pace operates bus service to O'Hare, stopping at the Multi-Modal Facility (MMF).

- Pulse Dempster Line (express service) to Davis CTA/Metra station via Des Plaines Metra station
- 250 Dempster Street (local service) to Davis CTA/Metra station via Des Plaines Metra station
- 330 Mannheim Road to Archer/Harlem via LaGrange Road Metra/Amtrak station

==== Inter-city bus ====
Several inter-city bus companies depart from the Multi-Modal Facility (MMF).

- Peoria Charter to Bloomington/Normal, Champaign/Urbana, Peoria, and West Lafayette
- Van Galder Bus Company to Rockford, Beloit, Janesville, and Madison
- Wisconsin Coach Lines to Kenosha, Racine, Milwaukee, and Waukesha

== Airlines and destinations ==
=== Passenger ===
Airlines	Destinations
Aer Lingus	Dublin
Aeroméxico	Mexico City–Benito Juárez; Seasonal: Guadalajara
Air Canada	Montréal–Trudeau, Toronto–Pearson, Vancouver
Air Canada Express	Montréal–Trudeau, Toronto–Billy Bishop, Toronto–Pearson
Air France	Paris–Charles de Gaulle
Air India	Delhi
Air Serbia	Belgrade
Alaska Airlines	Portland (OR), San Diego, Seattle/Tacoma; Seasonal: Anchorage
All Nippon Airways	Tokyo–Haneda, Tokyo–Narita
American Airlines	Albuquerque, Atlanta, Austin, Boise, Boston, Cancún, Charleston (SC), Charlotte, Dallas/Fort Worth, Denver, Fort Lauderdale, Fort Myers, Grand Rapids, Harrisburg, Hartford, Houston–Intercontinental, Indianapolis, Kansas City, Las Vegas, London–Heathrow, Los Angeles, Mexico City–Benito Juárez, Miami, Montego Bay, New Orleans, New York–JFK, New York–LaGuardia, Newark, Orange County (CA), Orlando, Philadelphia, Phoenix–Sky Harbor, Portland (OR), Punta Cana, Raleigh/Durham, Richmond, Sacramento, St. Louis, Salt Lake City, San Antonio, San Diego, San Francisco, San José del Cabo, San Juan, Seattle/Tacoma, Spokane, Tampa, Tokyo–Narita (resumes March 27, 2027), Tucson, Washington–National, West Palm Beach; Seasonal: Anchorage, Aruba, Athens, Baltimore, Barcelona, Bozeman, Buffalo, Calgary, Cleveland, Cozumel, Curaçao, Des Moines, Destin/Fort Walton Beach, Dublin, Eagle/Vail, Glacier Park/Kalispell, Grand Cayman, Guatemala City, Honolulu, Jackson Hole, Jacksonville (FL), Liberia (CR), Madrid, Minneapolis/St. Paul, Naples, Nashville, Nassau, Omaha, Palm Springs, Paris–Charles de Gaulle, Pittsburgh, Providence, Providenciales, Puerto Vallarta, Querétaro, Rome–Fiumicino, St. Croix, Sint Maarten, St. Thomas, Sarasota, Savannah, Syracuse, Vancouver
American Eagle	Akron/Canton, Albany, Allentown, Appleton, Asheville, Aspen, Atlanta, Baltimore, Bangor, Birmingham (AL), Bismarck, Bloomington/Normal, Boston, Buffalo, Cedar Rapids/Iowa City, Charleston (SC), Charlottesville (VA), Chattanooga, Cincinnati, Cleveland, Colorado Springs, Columbia (MO), Columbia (SC), Columbus–Glenn, Dayton, Des Moines, Detroit, El Paso, Erie, Evansville, Fargo, Fayetteville/Bentonville, Flint, Fort Wayne, Grand Rapids, Green Bay, Greensboro, Greenville/Spartanburg, Harrisburg, Hartford, Houston–Intercontinental, Huntsville, Indianapolis, Jacksonville (FL), Kalamazoo, Kansas City, Knoxville, La Crosse, Lansing, Lewisburg (WV), Lexington, Little Rock, Louisville, Madison, Manhattan (KS), Marion, Marquette, Memphis, Milwaukee, Minneapolis/St. Paul, Missoula, Moline/Quad Cities, Montréal–Trudeau, Mosinee/Wausau, Nashville, New Orleans, New York–JFK, Norfolk, Oklahoma City, Omaha, Peoria, Pittsburgh, Providence, Raleigh/Durham, Rapid City, Richmond, Roanoke, Rochester (MN), Rochester (NY), South Bend, St. Louis, San Antonio, Shenandoah Valley, Sioux Falls, Springfield (IL), Springfield/Branson, Syracuse, Toronto–Pearson, Traverse City, Tri-Cities (TN), Tulsa, Waterloo (IA), White Plains, Wichita, Wilkes-Barre/Scranton; Seasonal: Albuquerque, Billings, Bozeman, Burlington (VT), Calgary, Dallas/Fort Worth, Denver, Halifax, Harlingen (begins December 19, 2026), Hayden/Steamboat Springs, Hilton Head, Hyannis, Idaho Falls, Key West, Manchester (NH), Martha's Vineyard, Myrtle Beach, Nantucket, Panama City (FL), Pensacola, Portland (ME), Québec City, Santa Fe, Sarasota, Savannah, Sun Valley, Washington–National, Wilmington (NC)
Arajet	Punta Cana
Austrian Airlines	Vienna
Avelo Airlines	Seasonal: New Haven
Avianca	Bogotá
Avianca Costa Rica	Seasonal: Guatemala City, San José (CR)
Avianca El Salvador	Seasonal: San Salvador
British Airways	London–Heathrow
Cathay Pacific	Hong Kong
Condor	Seasonal: Frankfurt (begins May 14, 2027)
Contour Airlines	Burlington (IA), Cape Girardeau, Fort Leonard Wood, Kirksville, Manistee, Quincy
Copa Airlines	Panama City–Tocumen
Delta Air Lines	Atlanta, Boston, Detroit, Los Angeles, Minneapolis/St. Paul, New York–LaGuardia, Salt Lake City, Seattle/Tacoma
Delta Connection	Detroit, New York–JFK, New York–LaGuardia; Seasonal: Boston, Minneapolis/St. Paul
Denver Air Connection	Ironwood, Jackson (TN), Muskegon
EgyptAir	Cairo
Emirates	Dubai–International
Ethiopian Airlines	Addis Ababa
Etihad Airways	Abu Dhabi
EVA Air	Taipei–Taoyuan
Finnair	Seasonal: Helsinki
Frontier Airlines	Atlanta, Cancún, Dallas/Fort Worth, Denver, Fort Lauderdale, Fort Myers, Houston–Intercontinental, Las Vegas, Los Angeles, Orlando, Philadelphia, Phoenix–Sky Harbor, Salt Lake City, Tampa; Seasonal: Baltimore
Iberia	Madrid
Icelandair	Reykjavík–Keflavík
ITA Airways	Seasonal: Rome–Fiumicino
Japan Airlines	Tokyo–Haneda, Tokyo–Narita (ends March 27, 2027)
JetBlue	Boston, Fort Lauderdale
KLM	Amsterdam
Korean Air	Seoul–Incheon
LOT Polish Airlines	Kraków, Warsaw–Chopin
Lufthansa	Frankfurt, Munich
Philippine Airlines	Manila
Porter Airlines	Toronto–Billy Bishop
Qatar Airways	Doha
Royal Jordanian	Amman–Queen Alia
Scandinavian Airlines	Copenhagen
Sun Country Airlines	Asheville (begins May 28, 2027), Minneapolis/St. Paul, Knoxville (begins May 27, 2027)
Swiss International Air Lines	Zurich
TAP Air Portugal	Lisbon
Turkish Airlines	Istanbul
United Airlines	Albany, Albuquerque, Amsterdam, Aruba, Atlanta, Austin, Baltimore, Boston, Bozeman, Brussels, Buffalo, Burlington (VT), Calgary, Cancún, Cedar Rapids/Iowa City, Charleston (SC), Charlotte, Cincinnati, Cleveland, Columbus–Glenn, Dallas/Fort Worth, Denver, Des Moines, Detroit, Dublin, Eugene, Fort Lauderdale, Fort Myers, Frankfurt, Grand Rapids, Guatemala City, Harrisburg, Hartford, Honolulu, Houston–Intercontinental, Jacksonville (FL), Kahului, Kansas City, Las Vegas, London–Heathrow, Los Angeles, Madison, Memphis, Mexico City–Benito Juárez, Miami, Minneapolis/St. Paul, Montego Bay, Munich, Nashville, New Orleans, New York–LaGuardia, Newark, Norfolk, Omaha, Ontario, Orange County (CA), Orlando, Paris–Charles de Gaulle, Pensacola, Philadelphia, Phoenix–Sky Harbor, Pittsburgh, Portland (ME), Portland (OR), Puerto Vallarta, Punta Cana, Raleigh/Durham, Reno/Tahoe, Richmond, Rochester (NY), Rome–Fiumicino, Sacramento, St. Louis, Salt Lake City, San Antonio, San Diego, San Francisco, San Jose (CA), San José del Cabo, San Juan, Santa Barbara, São Paulo–Guarulhos, Sarasota, Savannah, Seattle/Tacoma, Sioux Falls, Syracuse, Tampa, Tel Aviv, Tokyo–Haneda, Tokyo–Narita, Toronto–Pearson, Traverse City, Vancouver, Washington–Dulles, Washington–National, West Palm Beach, Wichita, Zurich; Seasonal: Anchorage, Athens, Barcelona, Belize City, Bermuda (begins April 3, 2027), Boise, Colorado Springs, Cozumel, Dayton, Eagle/Vail, Edinburgh, Edmonton, Fairbanks, Fresno, Glacier Park/Kalispell, Grand Cayman, Greenville/Spartanburg, Hayden/Steamboat Springs, Indianapolis, Ixtapa/Zihuatanejo, Jackson Hole, Kailua-Kona, Key West, Knoxville, Liberia (CR), Milan–Malpensa, Missoula, Monterey, Montréal–Trudeau, Montrose, Myrtle Beach, Nassau, Ottawa, Palm Springs, Panama City (FL), Providence, Providenciales, Rapid City, Reykjavík–Keflavík, St. Lucia–Hewanorra, Sint Maarten, St. Thomas, San José (CR), Shannon, Tucson
United Express	Akron/Canton, Albany, Allentown, Appleton, Asheville, Billings, Birmingham (AL), Boise, Buffalo, Cedar Rapids/Iowa City, Charleston (SC), Charleston (WV), Charlotte, Charlottesville (VA), Chattanooga, Cincinnati, Clarksburg, Cleveland, Colorado Springs, Columbia (MO), Columbia (SC), Columbus–Glenn, Dayton, Decatur, Des Moines, Detroit, Duluth, Eau Claire, El Paso, Fargo, Fayetteville/Bentonville, Flint, Fort Dodge, Fort Wayne, Grand Rapids, Green Bay, Greensboro, Greenville/Spartanburg, Harrisburg, Houghton, Huntsville, Indianapolis, Johnstown (PA), Joplin, Kansas City, Knoxville, Lancaster (PA), Lexington, Lincoln, Little Rock, Louisville, Lynchburg, Madison, Memphis, Milwaukee, Moline/Quad Cities, Monterrey, Montréal–Trudeau, Morgantown (WV), Nashville, New Orleans, Norfolk, Oklahoma City, Omaha, Ottawa, Owensboro, Paducah, Panama City (FL), Peoria, Pittsburgh, Portland (ME), Providence, Richmond, Roanoke, Rochester (NY), Saginaw, St. Louis, Salina, Savannah, Shreveport, Sioux City, Sioux Falls, South Bend, Spokane, Springfield/Branson, State College, Syracuse, Toronto–Pearson, Traverse City, Tucson, Tulsa, West Lafayette (IN), Wichita, Wilkes-Barre/Scranton, Winnipeg; Seasonal: Albuquerque, Aspen, Bangor, Bozeman, Burlington (VT), Cody, Denver, Glacier Park/Kalispell, Great Falls, Gunnison/Crested Butte, Halifax, Hayden/Steamboat Springs, Hilton Head, Idaho Falls, Jacksonville (FL), Key West, Minneapolis/St. Paul, Montrose, Myrtle Beach, Nantucket, Pellston, Québec City, Raleigh/Durham, Rapid City, Rhinelander, St. George, Salt Lake City, San Antonio, Sault Ste. Marie (MI), Sun Valley, Wilmington (NC)
Viva	Guadalajara, León/Del Bajío, Mexico City–Benito Juárez, Monterrey, Morelia
Volaris	Guadalajara, León/Del Bajío, Mexico City–Benito Juárez, Morelia, Puebla (begins December 1, 2026), Querétaro
WestJet	Seasonal: Calgary

=== Cargo ===
Airlines	Destinations	Refs
AirBridgeCargo	Dallas/Fort Worth, Houston–Intercontinental, Luxembourg (all suspended)	
Air Canada Cargo	Toronto–Pearson	
Air China Cargo	Anchorage, Beijing–Capital, Frankfurt, New York–JFK, Shanghai–Pudong, Tianjin; Seasonal: Billings	
ANA Cargo	Tokyo–Narita	
Atlas Air	Amsterdam, Anchorage, Cincinnati, Dallas/Fort Worth, Frankfurt, Hong Kong, Honolulu, Los Angeles, Liège, Miami, Milan–Malpensa, New York–JFK, Seoul–Incheon, Stuttgart, Tokyo–Narita	
China Southern Cargo	Guangzhou, Shanghai–Pudong	
Emirates SkyCargo	Copenhagen, Dubai–Al Maktoum, Maastricht/Aachen, Miami	
Etihad Cargo	Abu Dhabi, Frankfurt	
LATAM Cargo Chile	Campinas	
Lufthansa Cargo	Anchorage, Atlanta, Frankfurt, Guadalajara, Los Angeles, Manchester (UK), Mexico City–AIFA, New York–JFK	
MSC Air Cargo	Indianapolis, Liège	
Nippon Cargo Airlines	Anchorage, Dallas/Fort Worth, Edmonton, Los Angeles, New York–JFK	
Qantas Freight	Anchorage, Auckland, Chongqing, Honolulu, Los Angeles, Melbourne, Sydney	
Qatar Airways Cargo	Amsterdam, Brussels, Doha, Los Angeles, Milan–Malpensa, Ostend/Bruges, Singapore	
Silk Way West Airlines	Baku	
Singapore Airlines Cargo	Anchorage, Atlanta, Brussels, Dallas/Fort Worth, Los Angeles, Seattle/Tacoma	
Turkish Cargo	Istanbul, Maastricht/Aachen, Shannon, Toronto–Pearson	

== Statistics ==
=== Top destinations ===
Busiest domestic routes from ORD (September 2025 – August 2026)
Rank	Airport	Passengers	Carriers
1	New York–LaGuardia, New York	1,372,151	American, Delta, Spirit, United
2	Los Angeles, California	1,171,810	American, Frontier, Spirit, United
3	San Francisco, California	987,440	American, United
4	Denver, Colorado	972,507	American, Frontier, Southwest, United
5	Dallas/Fort Worth, Texas	972,071	American, Frontier, Spirit, United
6	Boston, Massachusetts	957,009	American, Delta, JetBlue, United
7	Orlando, Florida	953,193	American, Frontier, Southwest, Spirit, United
8	Newark, New Jersey	883,386	American, Spirit, United
9	Houston-Intercontinental, Texas	871,307	American, Frontier, Spirit, United
10	Phoenix–Sky Harbor, Arizona	856,959	American, Frontier, Southwest, United

Busiest international routes from ORD (September 2025 – August 2026)
Rank	Airport	Passengers	Carriers
1	London–Heathrow, United Kingdom	1,025,659	American, British Airways, United
2	Toronto–Pearson, Canada	881,158	Air Canada, American, United
3	Cancún, Mexico	791,141	American, Frontier, Southwest, Spirit, United
4	Mexico City, Mexico	759,631	Aeroméxico, American, United, Viva, Volaris
5	Frankfurt, Germany	707,001	Lufthansa, United
6	Dublin, Ireland	494,043	Aer Lingus, American, United
7	Tokyo–Haneda, Japan	471,153	All Nippon Airways, Japan Airlines, United
8	Guadalajara, Mexico	412,878	Aeroméxico, Viva, Volaris
9	Paris–Charles de Gaulle, France	401,632	Air France, American, United
10	Munich, Germany	381,285	Lufthansa, United

=== Airline market share ===
Top airlines at ORD (September 2025 – August 2026)
Rank	Airline	Passengers	Percent of market share
1	United Airlines	40,752,235	48.0%
2	American Airlines	28,308,307	33.4%
3	Delta Air Lines	2,866,052	3.4%
4	Frontier	1,626,522	1.9%
5	Spirit	1,159,548	1.4%
	Other	10,100,000	11.9%
Note: Spirit airlines was not bankrupt yet when the sample was collected

== Major accidents and incidents ==
The following is a list of major crashes or incidents that occurred to planes at O'Hare, on approach, or just after takeoff from the airport:

- On September 17, 1961, Northwest Orient Airlines Flight 706, a Lockheed L-188 Electra, crashed upon takeoff, killing all 37 on board.
- On August 16, 1965, United Airlines Flight 389, a Boeing 727, crashed into Lake Michigan, 30 miles (48 km) east of O'Hare while on approach, killing all 30 on board.
- On December 27, 1968, North Central Airlines Flight 458, a Convair CV-580, crashed into a hangar at O'Hare, killing 27 on board and one on the ground.
- On December 20, 1972, North Central Airlines Flight 575, a Douglas DC-9, crashed upon takeoff after colliding with Delta Air Lines Flight 954, a Convair CV-880 which was taxiing across the active runway; 10 passengers on the DC-9 were killed.
- On May 25, 1979, American Airlines Flight 191, a McDonnell Douglas DC-10 on a Memorial Day weekend flight to Los Angeles International Airport, had its left engine detach while taking off from runway 32R, then stalled and crashed into a field some 4,600 feet (1,400 m) away. 273 died, including two on the ground, in the deadliest single-aircraft crash in United States history, and the worst aviation disaster in U.S. history prior to the September 11, 2001 attacks.
- On March 19, 1982, a United States Air Force KC-135 Stratotanker crashed upon approach to O'Hare 40 miles (64 km) northwest of the city (near Woodstock), killing 27 people on board.
- On February 9, 1998, American Airlines Flight 1340, a Boeing 727, crashed upon landing from Kansas City, injuring 22 passengers.
- On June 13, 2022, a particularly intense supercell coincided with the landing of American Airlines Flight 151 from Paris Charles de Gaulle, which caused extreme turbulence where ground ASOS reported a record-tying wind gust of 84 mph (135 km/h). One passenger was physically removed from their seat as a result, suffering severe injuries. The passenger was not wearing a seatbelt at the time of the incident. A lawsuit against the airline was filed in 2024.

== In popular culture ==
O'Hare has been used as a filming location and backdrop in numerous films and television productions.

Notable appearances include:

- Home Alone (1990) – Scenes of the McCallister family rushing through the airport to catch their flight were filmed on location at O'Hare. The sequence, which required several days of shooting with extensive coordination of extras, takes place in Terminal 3.
- Home Alone 2: Lost in New York (1992) – O'Hare again served as the airport from which the McCallister family departs; portions of the concourse and gates are shown as Kevin inadvertently boards the wrong plane.
- Risky Business (1983) – The airport is featured in a scene in which Joel Goodson (Tom Cruise) sees his parents off before they depart on a trip.
- Sleepless in Seattle (1993) – O'Hare appears in establishing shots representing the airport setting in the film.

== See also ==
- List of airports with triple takeoff/landing capability
- List of airports in Illinois
- List of the world's busiest airports, for a complete list of the busiest airports in the world
- Transportation in Chicago
