= Passenger facility charge =

Type of airline fee

A passenger facility charge (PFC) is a fee that almost all airline travelers in the United States pay in their ticket price. The fee goes toward the upkeep and maintenance of airports, and is set up and capped according to US federal law.

The law allows airports to charge up to $4.50 for every enplaned passenger at public agency-controlled commercial airports. Airports must use the money from the fees to pay for projects approved by the Federal Aviation Administration (FAA) that, according to the FAA, "enhance safety, security, or capacity; reduce noise; or increase air carrier competition."

== History ==
Beginning June 1, 1992, commercial airports that were controlled by public agencies began collecting passenger facility charges. The charges were added to airline tickets and, at the time, were $3 per passenger, per leg. Effective 2001, due to passage of the Wendell H. Ford Aviation Investment and Reform Act for the 21st Century, Congress raised the PFC cap to $4.50 per ticket or $18 per round trip.

Each month, the FAA publishes the "Key Passenger Facility Charge Statistics". The report summarizes the annual amounts given to airlines by the airports that collect the PFCs.

When the PFC program began, airlines were given 12 cents out of each PFC. In 1994, that amount went down to 8 cents. Between 2000 and 2004, the rate increased to 11 cents.

President Barack Obama, in his 2015 budget request, asked for the cap on fees to be raised to $8, which is slightly less than what airports had wanted.

== Statistics ==
In 2017, it was estimated that airports across the U.S. charged $260 million in passenger facility fees per month. The collection in all of 2017 was $3.286 billion; in 2018, it was $3.514 billion. In 2014, the collection was approximately $3 billion.

== Legislation and lobbying ==
In early 2017, Congressman Peter DeFazio (D-OR) and Thomas Massie (R-KY) introduced a bill, the "Investing in America: Rebuilding America's Airport Infrastructure Act", which would allow airports to increase PFCs. The bill would eliminate the $4.50 cap per flight segment. In exchange, funding for federal Airport Improvement Program grants would be reduced from $3.35 billion per year to $2.95 billion.

In 2016, a measure to increase the PFC cap to $8.50, which was backed by airport and travel industry trade groups, failed.

In June 2017, airports asked President Donald Trump to remove the PFC cap, "painting it as a way to raise money for infrastructure improvements while also making airports more self-sufficient," according to The Hill newspaper.

== Debate over a PFC increase ==
=== Opponents ===
In 2014, the year before Congress was set to reauthorize the Federal Aviation Administration, the airline industry lobbied against a $4 increase in PFCs. Airlines for America, the trade association representing major U.S. airlines, argued that a fee increase would amount to an undue tax that would reduce demand for air travel. The association argued that airports have plenty of resources to fund their taxes and that travelers already paid enough in special taxes and fees.

A representative from Airlines for America told the Huffington Post that the debate over increasing PFCs was really a disagreement about how airport infrastructure projects should be funded. In response to comments from the trade association representing airports that airlines were being hypocritical in opposing a PFC increase, the airline industry responded, “There’s a difference between charging someone directly for an optional service and a PFC, which is not optional. We consider a government-imposed tax much different than an optional fee.”

=== Supporters ===
During the 2014 fight before Congress, airports argued that the $4.50 per flight cap no longer carried the same purchasing power as it did when it was set in 2000. Airports wanted the limit raised to $8.50 per flight and indexed to inflation.

Airports pushed back at the airline industry's arguments, saying that airlines aren't "in a place to talk about fees." A lobbyist for airports told the Huffington Post, "Airlines for America has been really hyperventilating about increasing the PFC."

According to Airports Council International, a trade association for airports, PFCs "have become a foundation of airport capital investment, funding projects that benefit their local communities and meet airline and passenger demands to accommodate future growth and improve levels of service. Airports need to build now to meet the needs of the estimated one billion passengers who will use the U.S. aviation system by 2015."
