= 274th Air Support Operations Squadron =

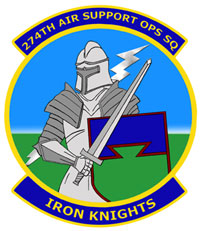
- 274th Communications Squadron emblem
- Active: 1942–1945; 1947–present
- Country: United States
- Allegiance: New York
- Branch: Air National Guard
- Role: Close air support
- Part of: 174th Attack Wing; New York Air National Guard; Air Combat Command
- Garrison/HQ: Hancock Field Air National Guard Base, Syracuse, New York
- Engagements: Iraq War (2003-2011); War in Afghanistan; Iraqi Civil War

Commanders
- Current commander: Lt Col Anthony Pasquale

Insignia
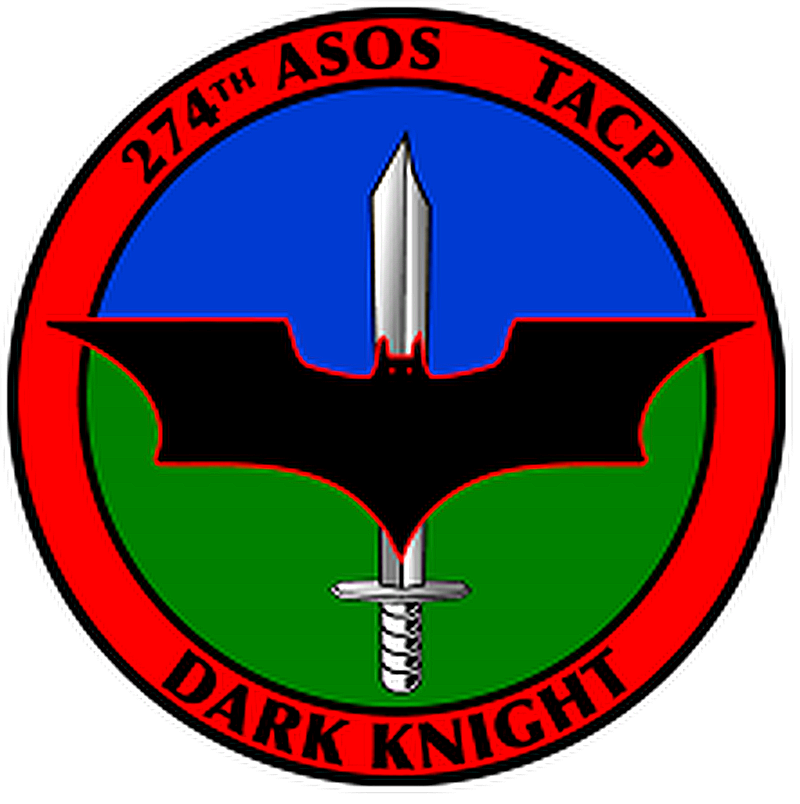
- 274th Air Support Operations Squadron Tactical Air Control Party

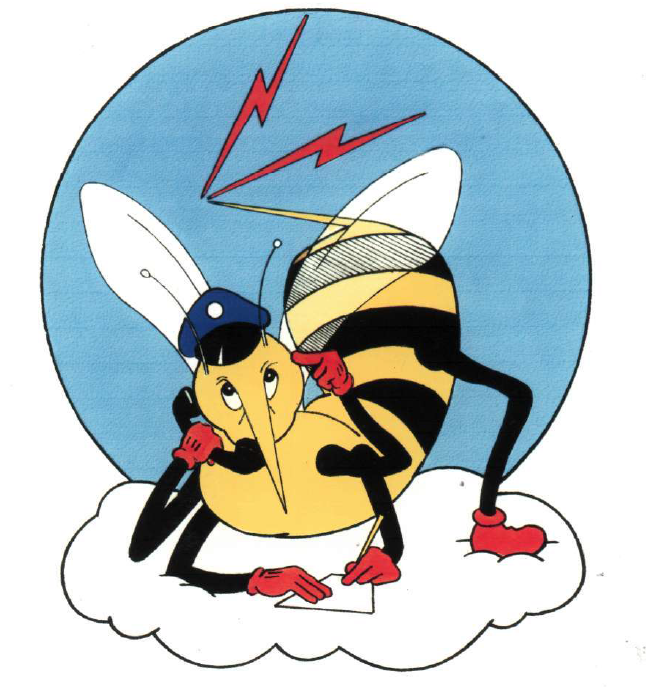
- Identification symbol

The United States Air Force's 274th Air Support Operations Squadron is a combat support unit located at Hancock Field Air National Guard Base, Syracuse, New York. The 274th provides tactical command and control of air power assets to the Joint Forces Air Component Commander and Joint Forces Land Component Commander for combat operations.

== Mission ==
The 274 Air Support Operations Squadron trains, equips, and deploys mission qualified Tactical Air Control Party (TACP) members consisting of Air Liaison Officers and Joint Terminal Attack Controllers (JTAC) in support of the 42d Infantry Division, 27th Infantry Brigade Combat Team, and 86th Infantry Brigade Combat Team. Unit members are tasked with providing advice, guidance, and planning considerations to United States Army ground commanders on the proper integration of USAF airpower and close air support into the ground scheme of maneuver. As JTACs, 274th members are further qualified to provide terminal guidance and attack execution in a combat environment.

In a domestic operations role, the 274th is responsible for establishing communications during state emergency response and contingency operations as ordered by the Governor of New York.

== History ==
=== World War II ===
The 313th Signal Company, Wing was constituted and activated on 1 December 1942 at Camp Pinedale, California and assigned to the Fourth Air Force for training purposes in preparation for reassignment overseas in support of World War II. Upon completion of training, the unit was assigned to Twelfth Air Force and transferred to the Camp Kilmer, New Jersey on 12 August 1943 to prepare for transport overseas. On 4 September 1943, the 313th loaded onto the S.S. Santa Elena, a converted luxury cruise liner from the Grace Line, at the New York Port of Embarkation where it departed for North Africa, arriving on 11 September. Upon arrival in North Africa, the 313th was reassigned to the 57th Bombardment Wing which it would remain under throughout the course of the war until inactivation. The 313th departed North Africa for Italy on 26 November 1943, arriving on 29 November.

In the Mediterranean Theater of Operations, the unit participated in the Allied Invasion of Italy during the Naples-Foggia Campaign from 18 August 1943 to 21 January 1944 and the Rome-Arno Campaign from 22 January 1944 till the end of the war. The 313th received battle credits and streamers for both campaigns. On 18 April 1944, the unit was transferred from Italy to Corsica.

On 15 April 1945, the unit was transferred back to Italy where it would remain throughout the duration of the war. On 4 October 1945 at Camp Marcianise, Italy, the 313th was formally inactivated and control of the unit was transferred to the War Department.

=== Cold War era ===
On 24 May 1946, the 313th was allotted to the New York National Guard and redesignated as the 102d Communications Squadron. On 29 March 1948, the unit was consolidated at the White Plains Armory in White Plains, New York and received Federal recognition with the mission to install, maintain, and operate communications facilities for the 52nd Fighter Wing, New York Air National Guard.

On 1 July 1952, the unit underwent major manpower and mission changes and was redesignated as the 274th Communications Squadron. The unit's new mission was to install, operate, and maintain mobile communications facilities in support of the 253rd Combat Communications Group, Air Force Communications Service, and Tactical Air Command communications area in a national emergency.

In July 1959, the 274th was assigned the primary mission to provide highly mobile communications teams in support of contingencies and relocated to Roslyn Air National Guard Station in East Hills, New York.

Changing with each Command served, the basic mission of the 274th was to provide, site, install, operate, and maintain deployed tactical communications equipment in support of a Tactical Air Base, providing commanders in the field with record and voice communications back to rear / area command headquarters via long haul radio systems and or in country circuits.

Communications were provided via long haul HF/ISB radio and later satellite radio systems. Tactical telephone, record communications, and Command and Control HF/SSB systems were the primary services provided. Local Area Networks (LAN) for computerized supply, personnel and maintenance reporting services were added later. All communications systems were highly complex and all were secured.

=== 1995 BRAC ===
In 1995, in order to produce a more efficient and cost-effective basing structure, the Base Realignment and Closure Commission recommended to the Secretary of Defense the closure of Roslyn ANGS and subsequent relocation of the 274th Combat Communications Squadron to Stewart Air National Guard Base in Newburgh, New York.

In 1998, rather than being moved to Stewart ANGB, the unit was to be moved to Hancock Field Air National Guard Base in Syracuse, New York and redesignated as the 274th Air Support Operations Squadron.

=== Air support operations ===
On 1 October 1999, the 274th Combat Communications Squadron was redesignated as the 274th Air Support Operations Squadron and relocated to Hancock Field ANGB. The 274 ASOS' new mission was tactical command and control of air assets while embedded with aligned US Army units. Despite the name change and new mission, the history of working with advanced communications equipment since World War II continued.

==== September 11, 2001 ====
The attacks on New York City on the morning of 11 September 2001 were the first operational test of the 274 ASOS. Within hours of the attacks, half of the unit loaded onto HC-130's from the 106th Rescue Wing for deployment to New York City as part of the initial response; the second half of the unit would follow on 12 September. The rapid notification and deployment ensured that unit members were on the ground and operational in less than 8 hours after the first attack.

In New York City, the unit's mission was to serve as a communications platform in the center of the city for the various first responder, aid, and relief units. Unit members drew upon their training and experiences working in austere environments within minimal equipment to effectively and efficiently relay communications between relief workers and local, state, and federal leadership.

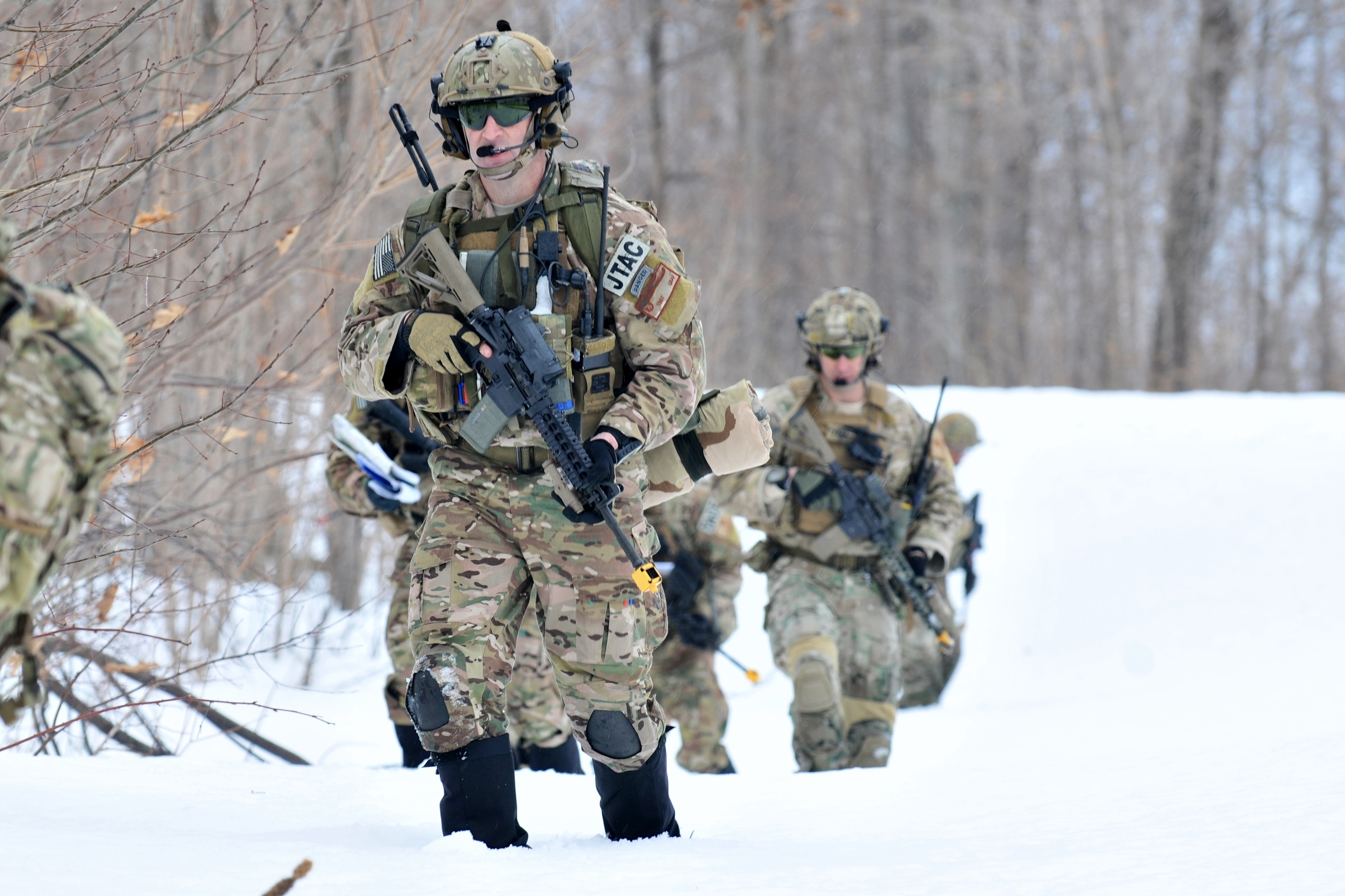
274th Close Air Support Squadron airmen during an exercise at Fort Drum

==== Afghanistan and Iraq ====
In anticipation of deployment operations as a result of the September 11th attacks, the 274th increased their training tempo and operational readiness, conducting close air support training throughout the winter in locations across the United States. The increased effort put towards JTAC training, readiness, and currency resulted in the unit being given initial operational capability (IOC) status in December 2002, paving the way for unit members to contribute to the operations in Afghanistan and to prepare for the expected operations in Iraq.

==== Domestic operations ====
As part of the domestic response role, the unit was activated several times for relief efforts, most recently for the flooding in Binghamton, New York caused by Tropical Storm Lee in September 2011 and Hurricane Sandy in New York City and the relief efforts in Buffalo, New York due to severe lake effect snowfall received in November 2014.

== Lineage ==
- Constituted as the 313th Signal Company, Wing

Activated on 1 December 1942
Inactivated 4 October 1945

- Redesignated 102d Communications Squadron, Wing and allotted to the National Guard on 24 May 1946

Organized on 15 March 1948

- Extended federal recognition on 29 March 1948
- Redesignated 274th Communications Squadron, Operations on 1 July 1952
- Redesignated 274th Communications Squadron (Operations) on 1 July 1955
- Redesignated 274th Communications Squadron, Tributary Team on 10 May 1961
- Redesignated 274th Mobile Communications Squadron (Contingency) on 16 March 1968
- Federalized and ordered to extended active duty on 24 March 1970
- Released from extended active duty and returned to New York state control on 26 March 1970
- Redesignated 274th Combat Communications Squadron (Contingency) on 1 April 1976
- Redesignated 274th Combat Information Systems Squadron on 1 July 1984
- Redesignated 274th Combat Communications Squadron on 1 October 1986
- Redesignated 274th Air Support Operations Squadron on 1 October 1999

=== Assignments ===
- Western Signal Aviation Training Center, 1 December 1942
- Twelfth Air Force, ~August 1943
- 57th Bombardment Wing, ~1944
- 52d Fighter Wing, 29 March 1948
- New York Air National Guard, 1 November 1950

Attached to 106th Composite Wing, 1 November 1950
Attached to 152d Aircraft Control and Warning Group, 2 April 1951
Attached to 107th Fighter Wing, 9 July 1951
Attached to 152d Tactical Control Group, c. July 1952

- 253d Communications Group (later 253d Mobile Communications Group, 253d Combat Communications Group, 253d Combat Information Systems Group, 253d Combat Communications Group), January 1953
- 174th Fighter Wing, 1 October 1999
- 152d Air Operations Group, 20 March 2013

=== Stations ===
- White Plains Armory, White Plains, New York, March 1948 – November 1954
- Westchester Air National Guard Base, Westchester, New York, December 1954 – June 1959
- Roslyn Air National Guard Station, East Hills, New York, July 1959 – September 1999
- Hancock Field Air National Guard Base, Syracuse, New York, October 1999 – Present

== See also ==
- List of United States Air Force Air Support Operations Squadrons
- United States Air Force Tactical Air Control Party
