= 108th Attack Squadron =

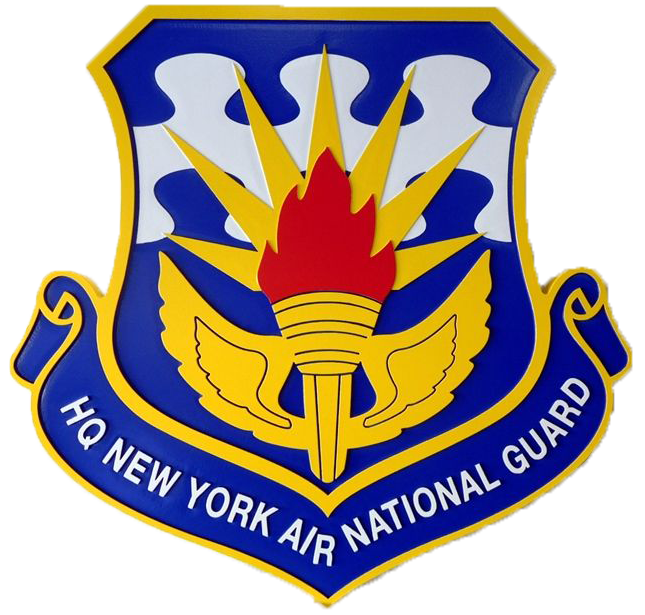
108th Attack Squadron

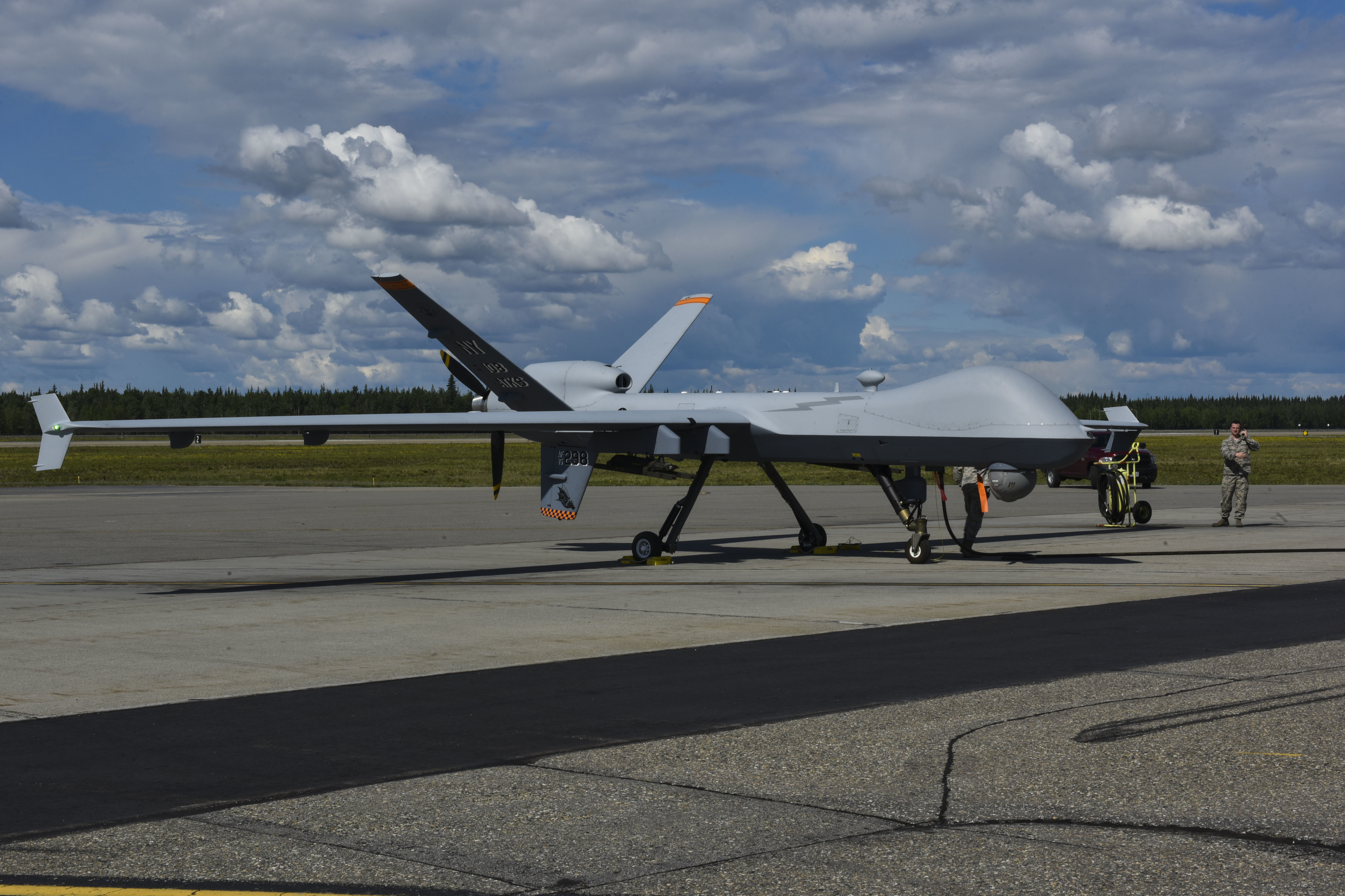
- One of the squadron's MQ-9 Reapers at Eielson Air Force Base, Alaska during Red Flag – Alaska in 2019
- Active: 1948–1953; 1953–1965; 1965–1994; 2014–present
- Country: United States
- Allegiance: New York
- Branch: Air National Guard
- Part of: New York Air National Guard; 174th Attack Wing; 174th Operations Group
- Garrison/HQ: Hancock Field Air National Guard Base, New York
- Motto: Potential Without Bounds

Insignia
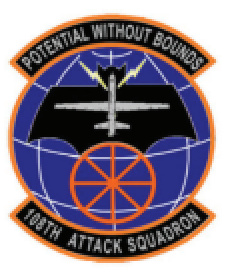
- 108th Attack Squadron emblem

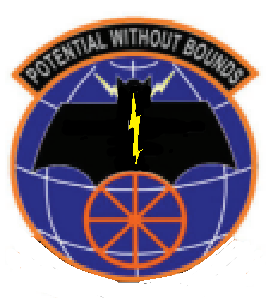
- 108th Tactical Control Flight emblem
- Tail code: NY

The 108th Attack Squadron is a unit of the New York Air National Guard, stationed at Hancock Field Air National Guard Base, New York. It was most recently activated on 5 October 2014 and assigned to the 174th Operations Group. The squadron operates the General Atomics MQ-9 Reaper and serves as a Formal Training Unit, producing qualified aircrew for both the Air National Guard and the active duty United States Air Force.

First organized in 1948 as the 108th Aircraft Control and Warning Squadron, the unit served in radar operations throughout the Cold War. It was called to active duty during the Korean War in 1951 and deployed to Newfoundland in 1953 to man a radar site under Northeast Air Command. The unit was again activated during the 1961 Berlin Crisis, deploying to Germany before returning to state control in 1962. It subsequently served as the 108th Tactical Control Squadron and later the 108th Air Control Squadron before being inactivated in 1994.

The squadron was redesignated the 108th Attack Squadron and reactivated in October 2014, taking over the training mission of the 138th Attack Squadron. In 2019, it became the first unit to bring MQ-9 Reapers to Red Flag – Alaska.

== Mission ==
The squadron is a Formal Training Unit for the General Atomics MQ-9 Reaper. It produces newly qualified aircrew, launch and recovery qualified aircrew, and instructor qualified aircrew for the Air National Guard and active duty Air Force. Also, it conducts continuation training and exercise support by launching and recovering Reapers that can be controlled from any other MQ-9A unit. It can also be tasked to launch domestic operations missions to support the Governor of New York or national missions when federally activated.

== History ==
=== Radar operations ===
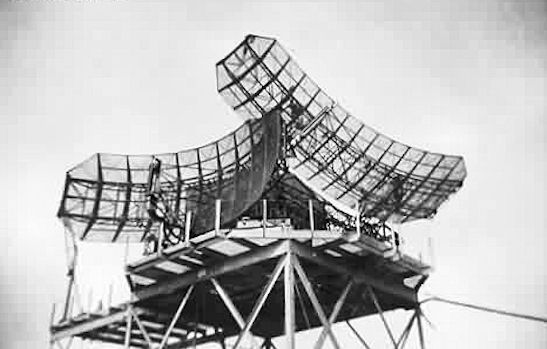
AN/CPS-6 radar

The squadron was first organized in 1948 as the 108th Aircraft Control and Warning Squadron at Hancock Field, receiving federal recognition as part of the 152nd Aircraft Control and Warning Group. Its first equipment was the AN/CPS-6 radar with a range of 100 miles. With the onset of the Korean War, the squadron was called to active duty in September 1951, moving to Grenier Air Force Base, New Hampshire for training as Air Defense Command (ADC) expanded its radar network. Within six months of its activation, the squadron was earmarked for overseas deployment. In February 1952, ADC reorganized its defenses and the squadron was reassigned directly to the 32nd Air Division.

As the air defense system expanded to provide earlier warning, in January 1953, the squadron moved to Newfoundland, where it manned a new radar site under the command of Northeast Air Command. It served there until August 1953, when its assets were transferred to the 642d Aircraft Control and Warning Squadron and the squadron was returned to state control.

The unit was activated again in the National Guard the following month with reduced size as the 108th Aircraft Control and Warning Flight. In 1958, the flight won the Commander's Trophy as the best unit in the New York Air National Guard. In October 1961, the flight was again called to active service during the 1961 Berlin Crisis, moving to Germany, where it manned a radar site under the 86th Air Division. It was returned to state control the following August.

The flight was inactivated in November 1965, when the 108th Tactical Control Squadron was activated. (Note: The two units were later consolidated as a single unit.) The new unit was redesignated the 108th Air Control Squadron in 1992. The squadron was inactivated in 1994.

=== Unmanned aerial vehicle training ===
The squadron was redesignated the 108th Attack Squadron and reactivated in October 2014, to assume the training mission of the 138th Attack Squadron, which then focused on operational missions. On 3 May 2015, the squadron opened a renovated Formal Training Unit facility to train pilots, sensor operators, and mission coordinators. The former General Dynamics F-16 Fighting Falcon avionics building is named after Major General Robert A. Knaff who saw the squadron's transition from F-16s to MQ-9s and increases the student body at the base to around 90. Renovations began on the facility in May 2014 and cost $3.5 million, half the projected cost of an entirely new building.

In 2019, the squadron was the first to bring MQ-9 Reapers to Red Flag – Alaska, flying out of Eielson Air Force Base while the pilots remained at their home station in New York, over 4,000 miles (6,400 km) away.

On 25 June 2020, one of the squadron's MQ-9s crashed at Hancock Field Air National Guard Base after losing engine power. An investigation determined that the cause of the accident was pilot error when it was found that the pilot accidentally cut the fuel supply to the drone's engine causing a crash.

== Lineage ==
108th Aircraft Warning and Control Squadron

- Constituted on 24 May 1946 as the 108th Aircraft Control and Warning Squadron and allotted to the National Guard

Organized on 15 January 1948
Received federal recognition on 22 November 1948

- Called to active duty on 1 September 1951

Returned to state control on 1 August 1953 and redesignated 108th Aircraft Control and Warning Flight

- Activated on 1 September 1953
- Called to active duty 1 October 1961
- Returned to state control on 1 August 1962

Inactivated c. 1 November 1965

- Consolidated with 108th Tactical Control Squadron

108th Attack Squadron

- Constituted as the 108th Tactical Control Squadron (CRC) (Note: Combat Reporting Center) on 1 September 1965 and allotted to the Air National Guard

Activated c. 1 November 1965
Redesignated 108th Tactical Control Squadron (FACP) (Note: Forward Air Control Point) on 1 September 1965
Redesignated 108th Tactical Control Squadron on 1 September 1965
Redesignated 108th Air Control Squadron in 1992
Inactivated on 16 February 1994

- Redesignated 108th Attack Squadron and activated on 5 October 2014

=== Assignments ===
- 152nd Aircraft Control and Warning Group, 22 November 1948
- 32nd Air Division, 6 February 1952
- Northeast Air Command, 19 January 1953
- 152nd Tactical Control Group, 1 August 1953
- 86th Air Division, 1 November 1961
- 152nd Tactical Control Group (later 152nd Air Control Group), 1 August 1962 – c. 1 November 1965, c. 1 November 1965 – 16 February 1994
- 174th Operations Group, 5 October 2014 – present

=== Stations ===
- Hancock Field, New York, 15 January 1948
- Grenier Air Force Base, New Hampshire, August 1951
- Pepperrell Air Force Base, Newfoundland, c. 7 April 1952
- Torbay Air Station, Newfoundland, c. April 1952
- Red Cliff Air Station, Newfoundland, 1 January – 1 August 1953
- Hancock Field, 1 September 1953
- Mainz Kastel Air Station, 1 August 1961
- Gutersloh Air Station, Germany, 1962
- Roslyn Air Force Station, 1 August 1962 – 1 November 1965
- Hancock Field (later Hancock Field Air National Guard Base), New York, 1 November 1965 – 16 February 1994
- Hancock Field Air National Guard Base, New York, 5 October 2014 – present
