= Franklin B. Ware =

American architect

- Born: 1873; New York City, U.S.
- Died: May 3, 1945 (aged 71–72); New York City, U.S.
- Occupation: Architect
- Buildings: White Plains Armory

Franklin B. Ware (1873 – May 3, 1945) was an American architect, best known for serving as the state architect of New York from 1907 to 1912.

He was born in New York City in 1873, and received a degree in architecture from Columbia University in 1894. He entered practice with his father and brother in 1900 under the name James E. Ware and Sons. From 1901 to 1905, he was on the New York City Board of Aldermen. From 1907 to 1912, he served as State architect of New York. His father died in 1918, and he continued in practice with his brother. In addition to designing the White Plains Armory while State architect, in private practice his partnership designed the Huntington Gymnasium at Colgate University; Baggs Park Museum and Grace Church at Utica, New York; United States Post Office at Ossining, New York; buildings at Marymount University, Tarrytown, New York; the Grant Avenue Presbyterian Church, Plainfield, New Jersey; and a number of private residences in New York and New Jersey. While in practice with his father, they designed City and Suburban Homes Company's First Avenue Estate Historic District, added to the National Register of Historic Places in 1986.
