= 174th Attack Wing =

Unit of the New York Air National Guard

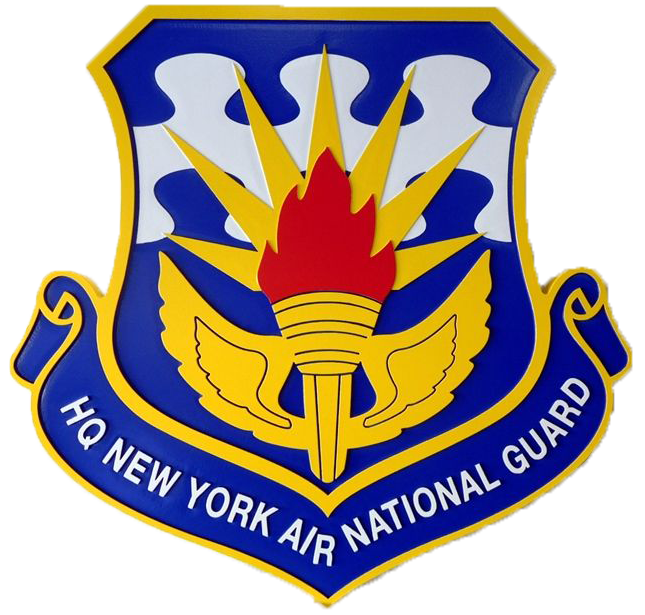
174th Attack Wing
- Active: 1962–present
- Country: United States
- Allegiance: New York
- Branch: Air National Guard
- Type: Wing
- Role: Intelligence, surveillance, and reconnaissance; Attack
- Part of: New York Air National Guard
- Garrison/HQ: Hancock Field Air National Guard Base, Syracuse, New York.
- Nickname: "The Boys From Syracuse"
- Decorations: Air Force Outstanding Unit Award with "V" device
- Website: 174attackwing.ang.af.mil

Commanders
- Current commander: Colonel John O'Connor
- Deputy commander: Colonel Brett Batick
- Command Chief: Command Chief Master Sergeant Sonja A. Williams

Insignia
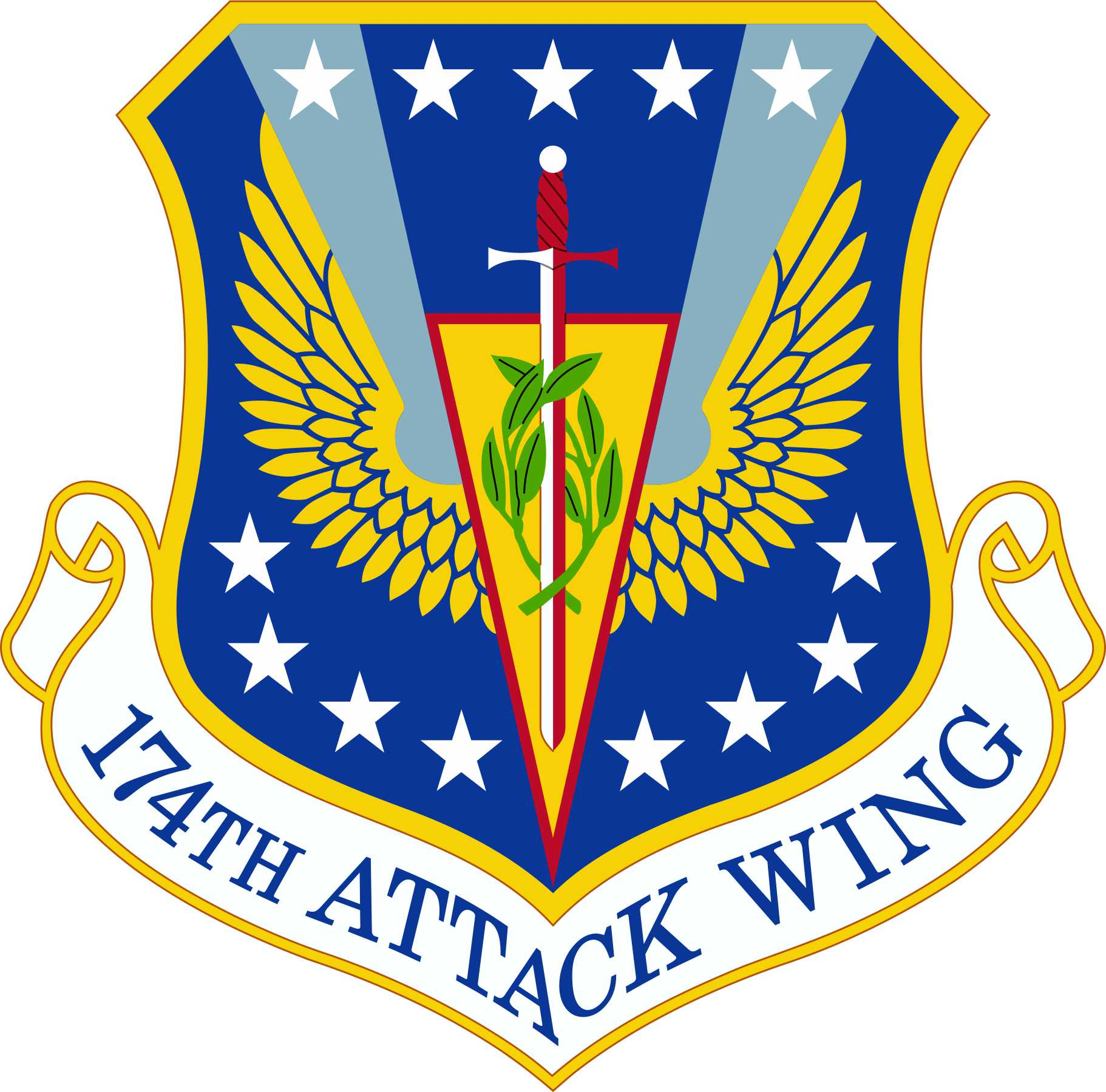
- 174th Attack Wing emblem
- Tail code: NY

Aircraft flown
- Attack: General Atomics MQ-9 Reaper

The 174th Attack Wing is a unit of the New York Air National Guard, stationed at Hancock Field Air National Guard Base, Syracuse, New York. The 174th is equipped with the MQ-9 Reaper. If activated to federal service, the Wing is gained by the United States Air Force Air Combat Command.

== Mission ==
The 174th Attack Wing currently operates the MQ-9 Reaper medium-altitude long-endurance unmanned aerial vehicle (UAV). Its mission is to provide qualified airmen and weapon systems engaging in global air, space and cyberspace operations; supporting homeland defense, joint operations, and aid to civil authorities at the direction of the Governor.

== Units ==
The 174th Attack Wing consists of the following major units:

- 152nd Air Operations Group
- 174th Operations Group
  - 108th Attack Squadron (MQ-9 Reaper)
  - 138th Attack Squadron (MQ-9 Reaper)
  - 174th Operation Support Squadron
- 174th Maintenance Group
- 174th Mission Support Group
  - 174th Security Forces Squadron
- 174th Medical Group

== History ==
Established by the USAF and allotted to New York ANG in 1962 as an expansion of the 138th Tactical Fighter Squadron. Received federal recognition by the National Guard Bureau and activated on 1 September 1962 as the 174th Tactical Fighter Group. The group was stationed at Hancock Field, Syracuse, New York. and allocated to Tactical Air Command.

Other squadrons assigned into the group were the 174th Headquarters, 174th Material Squadron (Maintenance), 174th Combat Support Squadron, and the 174th USAF Dispensary. The 138th TFS was equipped with the F-86H Sabre.

=== Vietnam era ===
The squadron engaged in normal peacetime training and exercises. In the summer of 1965, the squadron took part in Exercise Oneida Bear II at Fort Drum, which involved some 6,500 soldiers of the regular Army, the Army Reserve, and the National Guard. 138th TFS aircraft from Syracuse provided close air support to both aggressor and friendly forces during the exercise and were engaged in realistic tactical air strikes. In the exercise, conducted by the First Army, the Second Brigade of the Army's Fifth Infantry was opposed by an aggressor force of selected Army National Guard and Army Reserve Units. The 174th Group's pilots flew 77 sorties for a total of 114 hours without a single abort.

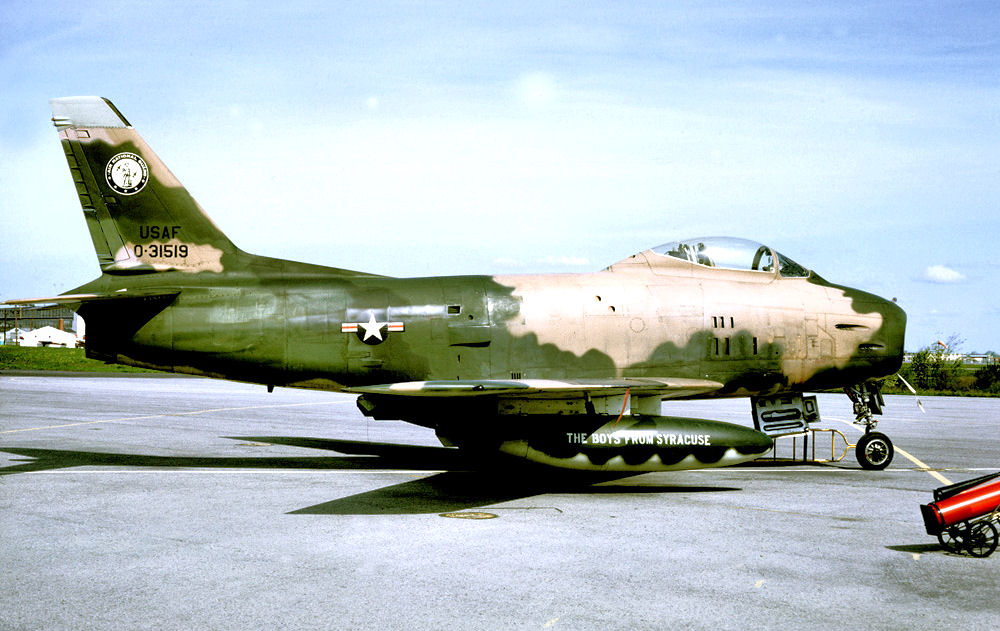
138th Tactical Fighter Squadron F-86H Sabre 53-1519 about 1966 in Vietnam War camouflage

The squadron trained at Ramey AFB, Puerto Rico, in early 1967 in an all service amphibious and airborne exercise. A detachment of unit pilots and support personnel participated (22 officers and 69 airmen). Twelve F-86H aircraft participated with three C-130 Hercules for equipment and personnel support. All types of tactical air missions were flown. Total sorties were 213, with total hours flown, 308. A special firepower demonstration was accomplished with 20 sorties delivering 40 (750 lbs) and 2000 rounds of 20 mm fired. Later in 1967, Operation Sentry Post I was held in August. This was a joint Air National Guard – TAC Exercise. Twelve F-86Hs were flown, and squadron pilots worked with radar flying air-to-air and air-to-ground gunnery with and without FAC-type missions. A total of 204 sorties and 245 hours were flown in this operation.

In 1968, the 174th TFG was federalized and placed on active duty. The Group was alerted for active duty on 11 April 1968, partially mobilized on 13 May and deployed to Cannon Air Force Base, Clovis, New Mexico. The mission of the 174th was to train Forward Air Controllers (FAC) for service in South Vietnam. The FAC flew a light observation aircraft at low altitudes, visually observing enemy installations and movements, and providing on-the-spot directions for fighters and bombers. The FAC dictated the type of ordnance to be delivered, observes the strike, and evaluates its effectiveness. The mission of the 174th was to give FACs in training actual experience in fighter aircraft so that they would be fully apprised of the requirements of the men they would be directing in combat in South Vietnam.

On arrival at Cannon AFB along with the Maryland Air National Guard 175th Tactical Fighter Squadron, they comprised the 140th Tactical Fighter Wing. Originally based in Denver, Colorado, headquarters of the 140th moved to Cannon AFB with the deployment of the 140th Tactical Fighter Group to active duty in Vietnam. Not all members of the 174th Tactical Fighter Group were mobilized, however. Subsequent to the alert notice, a change directed mobilization of only the Group Headquarters, the 138th Tactical Fighter Squadron, and the 174th Camron. The remaining members of the 174th remained in Syracuse on a drill status during the eight months of mobilized service. The unit was released from active duty as of 20 December 1968, and all members reverted to Air National Guard drill status.

==== Close air support ====
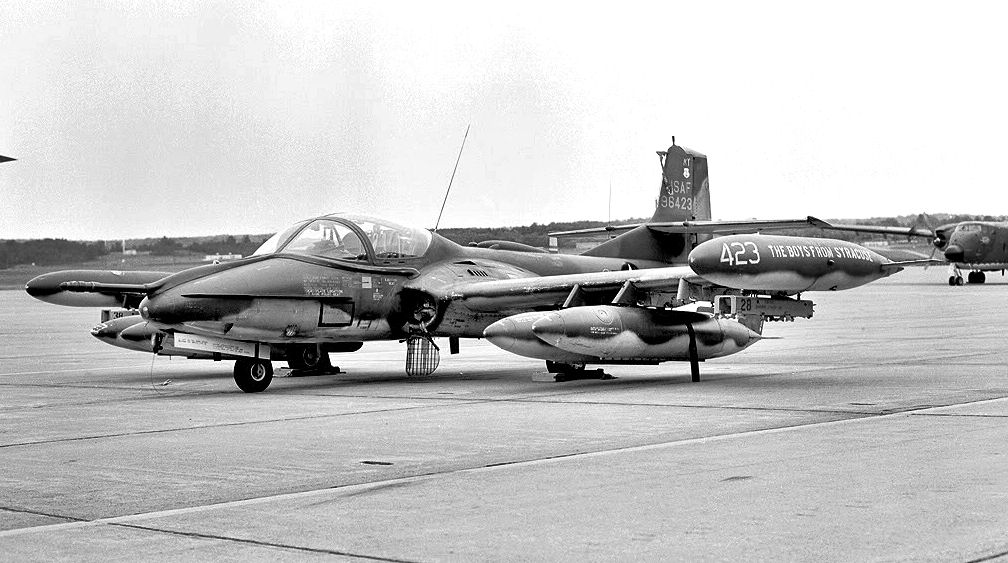
138th TFS Cessna A-37B Dragonfly 69-6423, 1974

In 1970, the 174th began retiring its F-86H Sabres after over a decade of service, the 138th Tactical Fighter Squadron flying the last USAF/ANG Sabre sortie on 30 September. Replacing the Sabre was the Cessna A-37B Dragonfly and a newly conceived close air support tactical fighter mission in a ground insurgency environment, which were gained by combat experience in Vietnam.

After a decade of routine peacetime exercises and training with the A-37, in 1979 the 174th began a transition to the A-10A Thunderbolt II. With the arrival of the A-10, the 174th was changed in status from a Group to a Wing on 1 July 1979. The wing was one of three Air National Guard units equipped with the A-10 as part of the "Total Force" concept which equipped ANG units with front-line USAF aircraft. In 1980, after the transition to the A-10 was completed, the 138th TFS was deployed to Savannah Air National Guard Base, Georgia. On arrival, the unit was given sealed orders directing them to a remote, forward operational location and operate combat sorties, fully loaded with live ordnance. Not only was the 174th's combat readiness put to the optimum peacetime test, but the unit's mobility was tested to the fullest. In response, an additional six A-10s were assigned to it, making the 138th TFS the Air National Guard's only "super" squadron, with 24 aircraft.

With the transition complete, the unit deployed eight A-10 aircraft from Syracuse, non-stop to a forward operation location in West Germany. In exercise Cornet Sail, the 138th demonstrated for the first time the ability of an Air National Guard or Air Force Reserve unit to deploy this advanced aircraft in this manner. Combat readiness in West Germany was achieved 12 hours after departing Hancock Field.

With the move of the USAF 21st Air Division to Griffiss AFB in 1984, the 174th TFW became the host unit at Hancock Field. Later that year, the unit deployed to Exercise Air Warrior at the National Training Center, Fort Irwin, California; a three-week deployment to Lechfeld Air Base, West Germany and with the NY ANG 107th Fighter-Interceptor Group at Goose Air Base, Labrador.

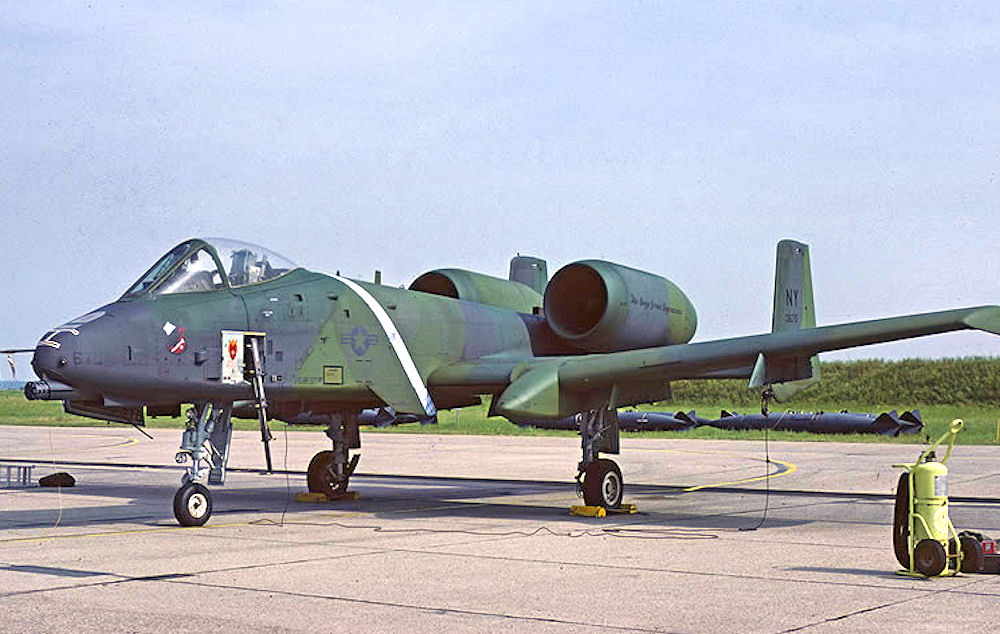
A 138th TFS A-10A Thunderbolt II 78-0670

The 174th was also among the first A-10 close support aircraft organizations to provide temporary tactical air defense support from Howard Air Force Base, Panama when the unit deployed to Howard in March 1985 when runway construction precluded the use of the A-7D Corsair IIs that normally fulfilled the tactical air defense duties of the Panama Canal. Shortly afterward, it deployed to Alaska for the first time. The 138th TFS completed the 2,700-mile flight to Eielson Air Force Base without external navigation aids.

As in past years, continuing NATO deployments to West Germany in the late 1980s saw the 174th TFW personnel training and living side-by-side with their West German Air Force counterparts as they would in a combat situation. The 174th began 1988 on a high note when the Air Force announced the wing would convert from the A-10 to the specialized Block 10 F-16A/B Fighting Falcon, also referred to as the F/A-16 due to its close air support configuration. With the Block 10 F-16, the 174th became the first Air Force organization to fly the Fighting Falcon with a Close Air Support mission.

The first F-16 aircraft started arriving in late 1988. These aircraft were passed down from regular USAF units who were upgrading to the F-16C/D model. During 1989, the 138th TFS was chosen as a test unit for a close air support version of the F-16 which involved fitting the Pave Penny laser spot tracker and the General Electric GPU-5/A Pave Claw gun pod (the only F-16s ever equipped with this pod). Mounted under the centerline fuselage pylon normally reserved for a large drop tank, the GPU-5/A was a completely self-contained pod with 353 rounds of ammunition for a GAU-13/A 30mm rotary cannon intended for use against a variety of battlefield targets, including armor. The unit received the USAF's Outstanding Maintenance Squadron Award that year.

==== Operation Desert Storm ====
In 1991, the 138th TFS deployed to the Persian Gulf with 516 members in support of Operation Desert Storm. The 138th was one of only two Air National Guard units to fly combat missions during Operation Desert Storm. Attempts to fly Close Air Support with the GPU-5/A gun pod however proved to be a failure and the pods were removed from service after barely a day of combat use because of its very poor accuracy. Despite the cannon's impressive ballistic characteristics, the pylon mounting was insufficiently rigid to prevent deflection, with the weapon's heavy recoil exacerbating the problem by causing pylon misalignment. Further, the GPU-5 was not integrated into the F-16's sighting system which lacked the required CCIP (continuously computed impact point) software. The ineffective gun pods were quickly removed in favor of centerline tanks and more effective air-to-ground munitions such as (cluster) bombs.

The unit received the Air Force Outstanding Unit Award, with the "V" device for valor, during Operation Desert Storm; the Air Force Association Outstanding Unit Award; and the National Guard Association's Best Family Support Center Award.

=== Air Combat Command ===
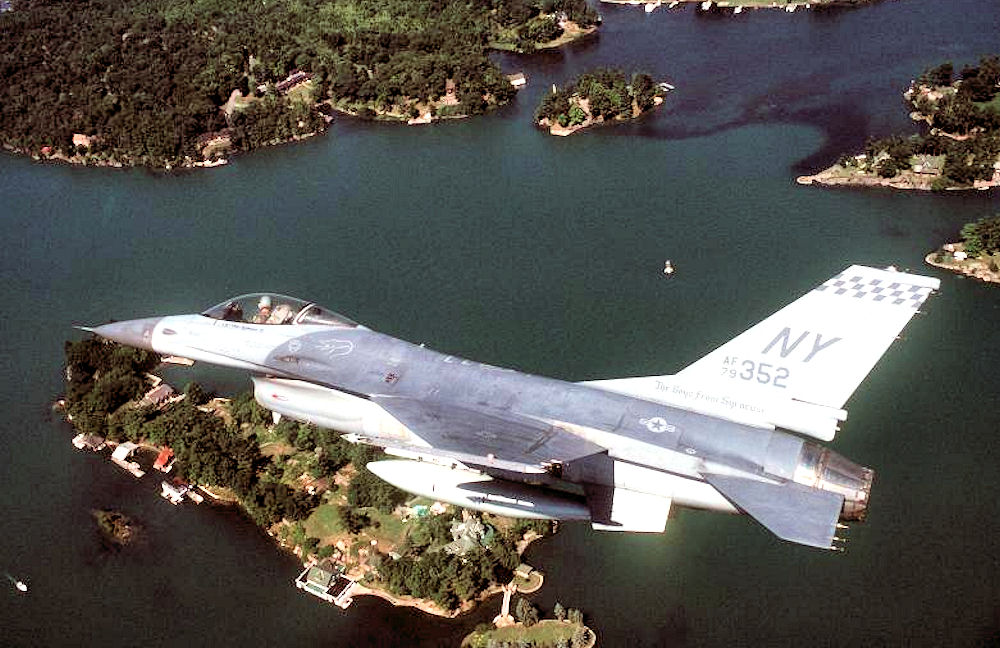
138th TFS – General Dynamics F-16A Block 10 Fighting Falcon 79-0352

In March 1992, with the end of the Cold War, the 174th adopted the Air Force Objective Organization plan, and the unit was re-designated as the 174th Fighter Wing. With the organization change, the 138th Fighter Squadron was assigned to the new 174th Operations Group. In June, Tactical Air Command was inactivated as part of the Air Force reorganization after the end of the Cold War. It was replaced by Air Combat Command (ACC).

In 1993 the 174th FW started trading in their old Block 10 F-16 A/B models for newer Block 30 F-16C/D aircraft configured for Tactical Air Support. In that process the squadron had the 'honor' of sending the first F-16 to storage at the Aerospace Maintenance and Regeneration Center on Davis–Monthan Air Force Base, Arizona. This happened on 20 July 1993, when an F-16A (#79-0340) was flown to Davis-Monthan for flyable storage. Although these aircraft were only 13 years old, they were put into storage due to more modern models becoming available and Block 10 wasn't needed any longer by the USAF. The general mission for the squadron remained unchanged with this transition.

Also in 1993, the 138th TFS became the first US unit to have a female F-16 fighter pilot, Jackie Parker, in 1993 immediately after combat roles were opened to women.

In June 1995, the unit deployed for 30 days rotation to Incirlik Air Base, Turkey as part of Operation Provide Comfort, assisting in the enforcement the No Fly Zone over Northern Iraq.

In mid-1996, the Air Force, in response to budget cuts, and changing world situations, began experimenting with Air Expeditionary organizations. The Air Expeditionary Force (AEF) concept was developed that would mix Active-Duty, Reserve and Air National Guard elements into a combined force. Instead of entire permanent units deploying as "Provisional" as in the 1991 Gulf War, Expeditionary units are composed of "aviation packages" from several wings, including active-duty Air Force, the Air Force Reserve Command and the Air National Guard, would be married together to carry out the assigned deployment rotation.

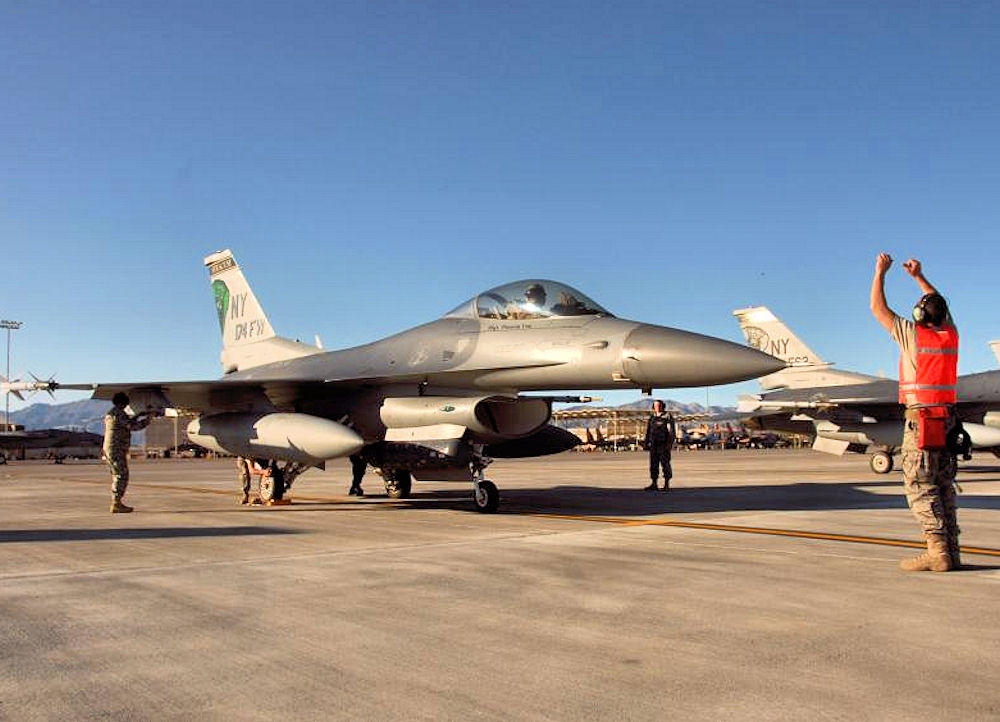
138th Fighter Squadron – General Dynamics F-16C Block 30B Fighting Falcon 85-1570 at Nellis AFB, Nevada during the units final deployment with the F-16, 2009.

The 138th Expeditionary Fighter Squadron (138th EFS) was first formed and deployed in August 1996 for Operation Northern Watch. Operation Northern Watch was a US European Command Combined Task Force (CTF) together with the United Kingdom and Turkey responsible for enforcing a no-fly zone above the 36th parallel in Iraq. This mission was a successor to Operation Provide Comfort which also entailed support for the Iraqi Kurds.

In 1997, the 138th Fighter Squadron commemorated its 50th anniversary in conjunction with the United States Air Force by hosting the United States Air Force Thunderbirds aerobatics team at the Syracuse Air Show.

During 1996–97, the 174th FW deployed to Andøya Air Station, Norway as part of the "Adventure Express 97" NATO exercise. In 1998, the 174th FW deployed to Tyndall AFB, Florida, for the "Combat Archer" exercise and also to the Dugway Proving Ground, Utah, to participate in exercise "Global Patriot 98".

Only six years later, in 1999, the 138th FS changed block types once more, sending its Block 30s to the Illinois ANG 170th Fighter Squadron and receiving older block 25 F-16s from the Texas ANG 182d Fighter Squadron. This meant changing again from the General Electric engine to the Pratt & Whitney.

An AEF deployment to Prince Sultan Air Base, Saudi Arabia resulted in the formation of the 138th EFS in early 2000. Operation Southern Watch was an operation which was responsible for enforcing the United Nations mandated no-fly zone below the 32d parallel in Iraq. This mission was initiated mainly to cover for attacks of Iraqi forces on the Iraqi Shi’ite Muslims. The squadron returned to the Block 30 Aircraft in 2004, receiving aircraft from the 50th TFW at Spangdahlem Air Base, Germany shifting from engine type once more.

As part of the global war on terrorism, the 138th EFS deployed twice to Balad Air Base, Iraq in 2006 and 2008.

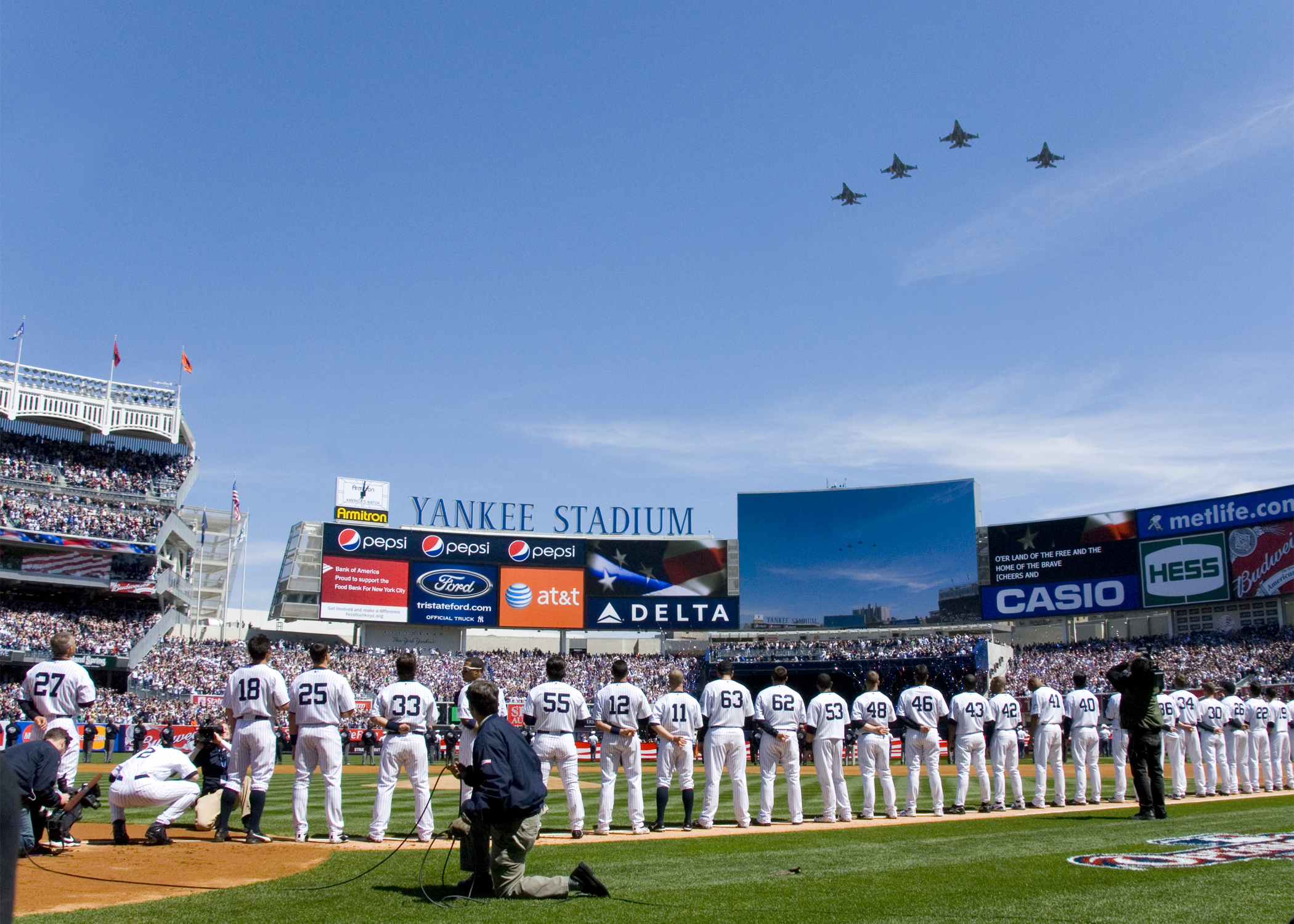
Four F-16C Fighting Falcons from the 174th Fighter Wing fly over the "New" Yankee Stadium on Opening Day in 2009

In 2008 and 2010 members 174th Fighter Wing Security Forces Squadron deployed to Manas Air Base in Kyrgyzstan. The Security Forces members were attached to the 376th Expeditionary Security Forces Squadron where they provided base security.

In 2012 members of the 174th Attack Wings Security Forces Squadron deployed to Bagram Airfield Afghanistan. The Security Forces members were attached to the 455th Expeditionary Security Forces where they provided base security, fly away security, and air base ground defense.

=== MQ-9 Reaper and Attack Mission ===
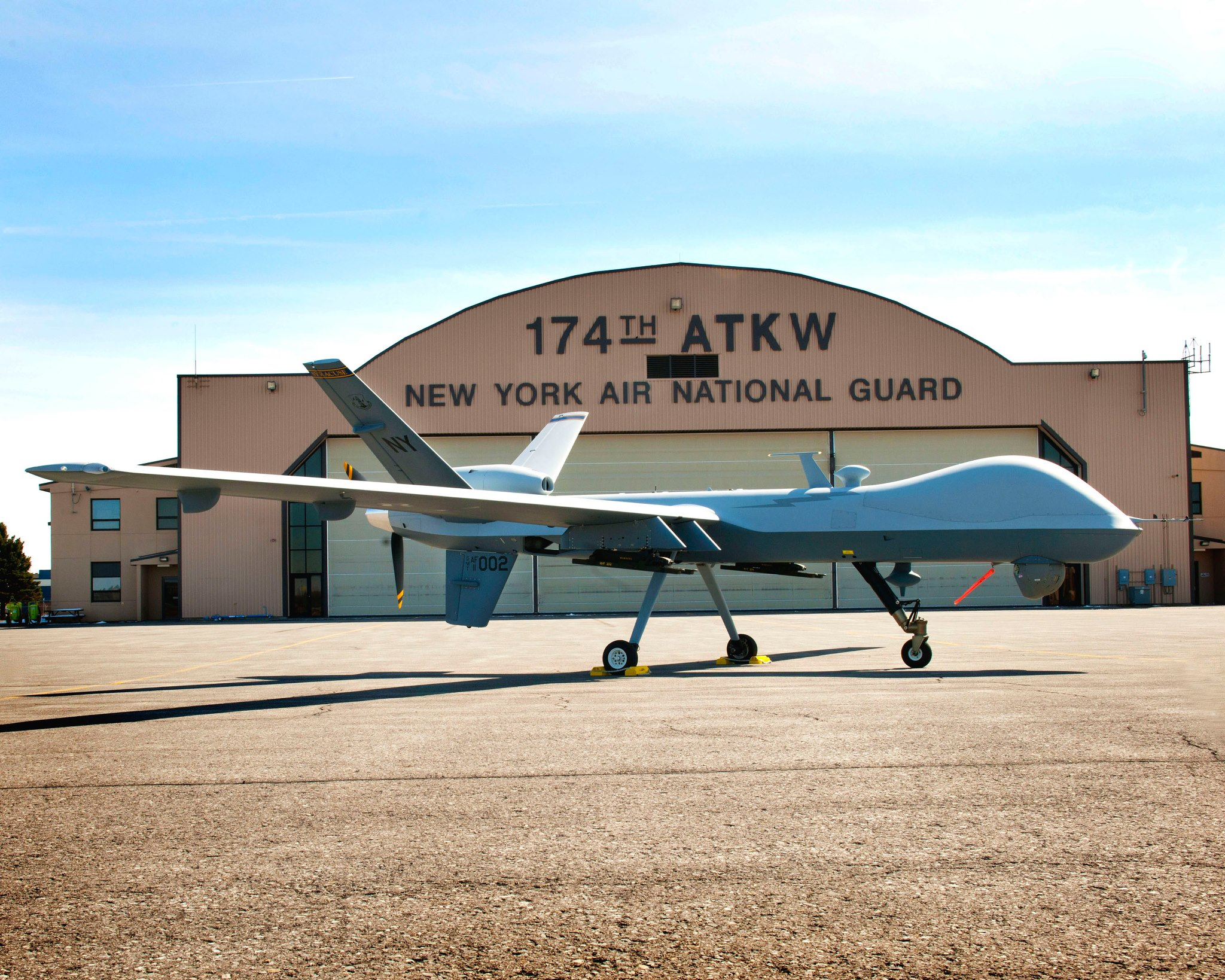
General Atomics MQ-9 Reaper

In 2008 it became apparent that the 138th FS was going to lose its F-16s and that Hancock ANGB would lose its manned aviation after more than 60 years of operations. The squadron was set to fly the MQ-9 Reaper unmanned aerial vehicle (UAV). The unit's transition from flying F-16 fighter jets in theater to operating unmanned aircraft from the suburbs was more than a tactical shift: it assured the future of the base at Hancock Field. In October 2009, the 174th Fighter Wing cut the ribbon on its new MQ-9 Reaper maintenance school, where it trains technicians from across the country, from all military branches. The 174th Fighter Wing converted to the MQ-9 Reaper and began flying 24/7 operations in support of Operation Enduring Freedom on 1 December 2009.

On 6 March 2010 the last two F-16s (#85-1561 and #85-1570) departed Hancock Field marking the end of F-16 operations at the base. They made three low passes for the assembled crowd gathered to commemorate the end of manned aviation at the Syracuse ANG base in upstate New York. The 174th Fighter Wing was renamed 174th Attack Wing on 9 September 2012, becoming the first Air National Guard MQ-9 Reaper Remotely Piloted Aircraft (RPA) unit. The wing's MQ-9 Reaper have flown combat missions in Afghanistan since November 2009, supporting the global war on terror.

=== Lineage ===
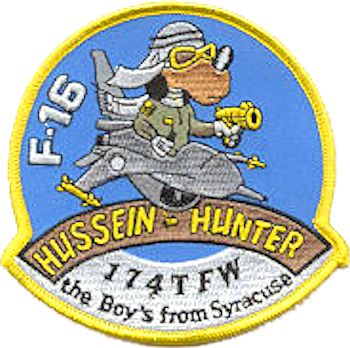
1991 Desert Storm patch

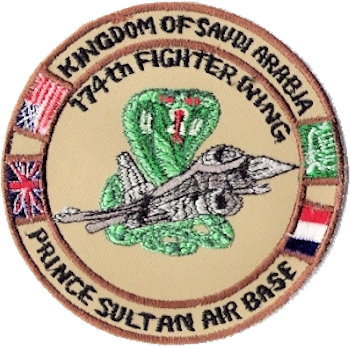
Operation Southern Watch deployment patch

- Established as 174th Tactical Fighter Group and allotted to New York ANG in 1962

Received federal recognition and activated on 1 September 1962
Status changed from Group to Wing on 1 July 1979
Redesignated 174th Tactical Fighter Wing on 1 July 1979
Redesignated 174th Fighter Wing on 16 March 1992
Redesignated 174th Attack Wing on 9 September 2012

=== Assignments ===
- New York Air National Guard, 1 September 1962

Gained by Tactical Air Command, ???? – 31 May 1992
Gained by Air Combat Command, 1 June 1992 – present

=== Components ===
- 174th Operations Group, 1 June 1992 – present
- 138th Tactical Fighter (later Fighter, Attack) Squadron, 1 September 1962 – 1 June 1992

=== Stations ===
- Hancock Field, Syracuse, New York, 1 September 1962

Designated Hancock Field Air National Guard Base, 1991 – present

=== Aircraft ===
- F-84B Thunderjet, 1950
- F-51 Mustang, 1950–54
- F-94 Starfire, 1954–57
- F-86H Sabre, 1957–70
- A-37B Dragonfly, 1970–79
- A-10A Thunderbolt II, 1979–89
- Block 10 F-16A/B Fighting Falcon (F/A-16), 1989–93
- Block 30 F-16C/D Fighting Falcon, 1993–99; 2004–10
- Block 25 F-16C/D Fighting Falcon, 1999–2004
- MQ-9 Reaper, 2010 – present
