= 138th Attack Squadron =

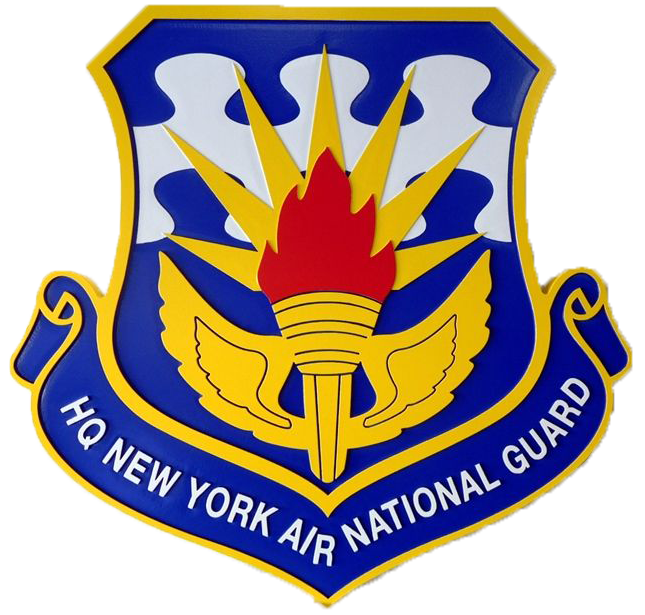
138th Attack Squadron

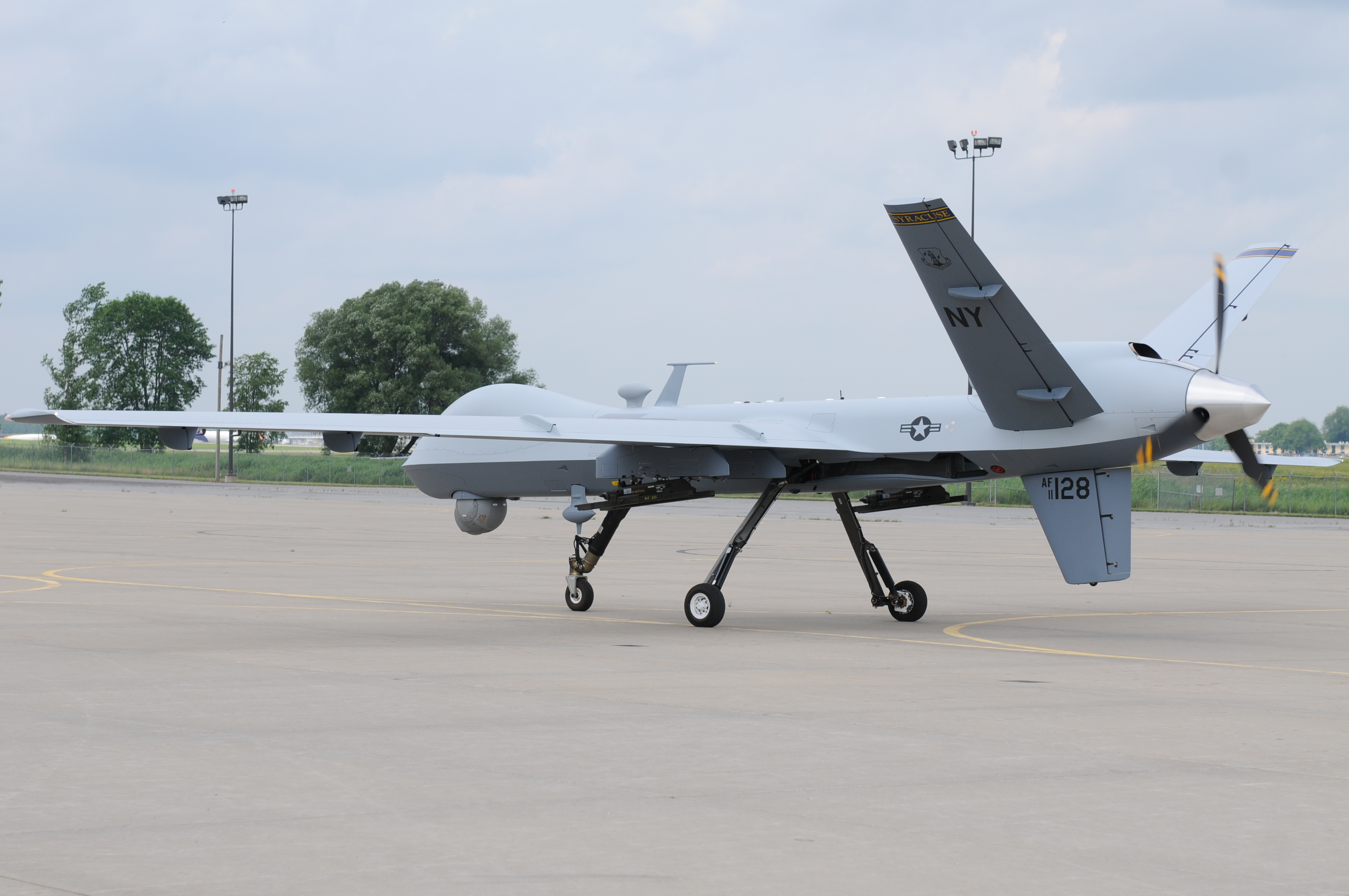
- MQ-9 Reaper at Hancock Field ANGB
- Active: 1942–1945; 1947–present
- Country: United States
- Allegiance: New York
- Branch: Air National Guard
- Type: Squadron
- Role: ISR/Attack
- Part of: New York Air National Guard
- Garrison/HQ: Hancock Field Air National Guard Base, New York
- Nickname: The Boys from Syracuse (Note: The nickname was given to the unit by Col. Curtis Irwin in 1958. The name came from the Rogers and Hart musical, The Boys from Syracuse, based upon William Shakespeare's A Comedy of Errors. The nickname gave a unique connection to the unit's hometown.)
- Engagements: European Theater of Operations; Gulf War
- Decorations: Distinguished Unit Citation

Insignia
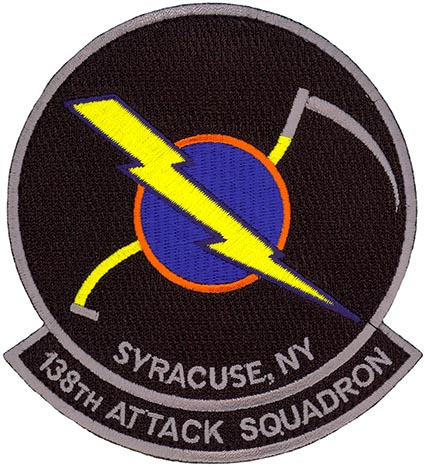
- 138th Attack Squadron emblem

- 138th Fighter-Interceptor Squadron emblem

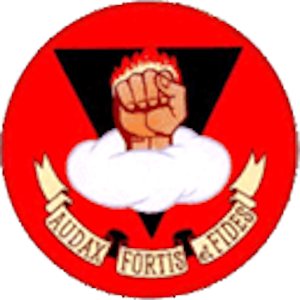
- 505th Fighter Squadron emblem
- Tail code: NY
- World War II fuselage code: 6N

Aircraft flown
- Attack: General Atomics MQ-9 Reaper

The 138th Attack Squadron is a unit of the New York Air National Guard's 174th Attack Wing located at Hancock Field Air National Guard Base in Syracuse, New York. The 138th is equipped with the General Atomics MQ-9 Reaper remotely piloted aircraft.

The squadron was first activated in 1942 as the 484th Bombardment Squadron, a dive bomber unit. After converting to fighter aircraft as the 505th Fighter-Bomber Squadron. The squadron deployed to the European Theater of Operations, where it participated in combat, earning a Distinguished Unit Citation and destroying 55 enemy aircraft in air to air combat. Following V-E Day, it returned to the United States, where it was inactivated at the Port of Embarkation in October 1945.

In 1946, it was allotted to the National Guard and in 1947 was activated in the New York National Guard as the 138th Fighter Squadron. In 1950, it became one of the first Air National Guard squadrons to be equipped with et fighters, but with the onset of the Korean War its jets were transferred to the active duty Air Force and it reverted to propeller driven fighters. It returned to flying jets in 1954 and maintained an air defense mission until 1958, when it became a tactical fighter unit. During the 1961 Berlin Crisis, the squadron was called into federal service and deployed to France to reinforce NATO.

The squadron was called to active duty a second time in 1968. It moved to Cannon Air Force Base, where it served as a training unit until returning to state control at the end of the year. It continued to fly fighters, deploying aircraft and aircrew to the Middle East during Operation Desert Storm. In 2012, the squadron converted to unmanned aerial vehicle operations as the 138th Attack Squadron.

== History ==
=== World War II ===
==== Organization and training ====
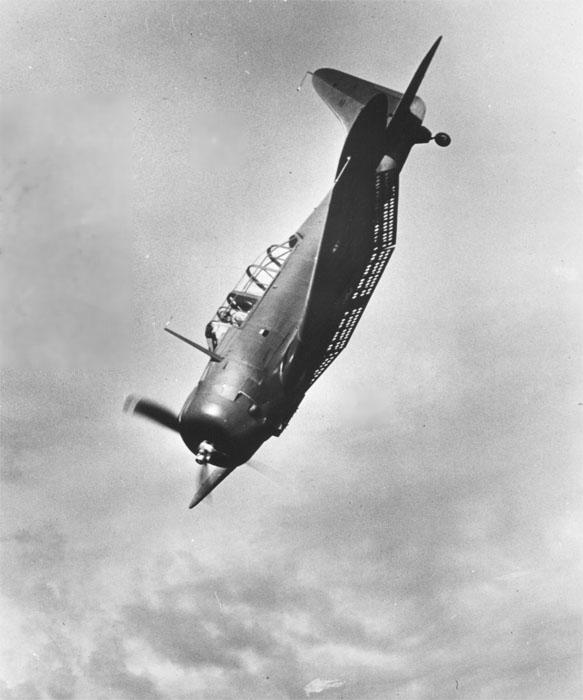
A-24, first plane flown by the squadron

The squadron was formed in August 1942 as the 484th Bombardment Squadron at Hunter Field, Georgia, one of the original four squadrons of the 339th Bombardment Group. It was equipped with Douglas A-24 Banshee dive bombers. In July 1943, it moved to Walterboro Army Air Field, South Carolina, where it re-equipped with Bell P-39 Airacobras. The following month, along with all other single engine bomber units of the Army Air Forces (AAF), it was redesignated as a fighter-bomber unit, becoming the 505th Fighter-Bomber Squadron. It moved to Rice Army Air Field, California in September 1943, where in addition to training with its P-39s, it participated in maneuvers. It departed Rice for the European Theater of Operations on 9 March 1944, sailing from the New York Port of Embarkation on the MV Stirling Castle on 22 March.

==== Combat in the European Theater ====
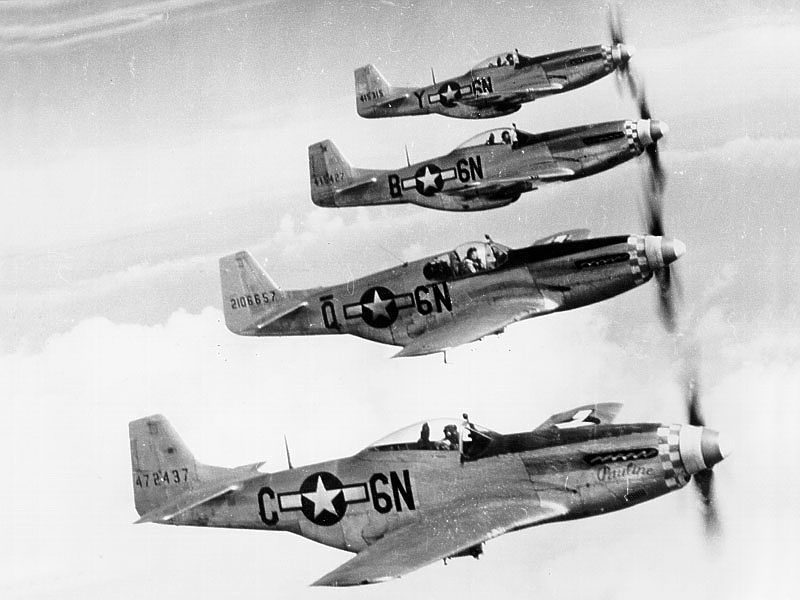
505th Fighter Squadron P-51 Mustang formation, 1945

The squadron landed in England on 4 April and arrived at its combat station, RAF Fowlmere, the next day. Its first airplane arrived on 12 April, a North American P-51B Mustang. It quickly converted to the new fighter, and flew its first combat mission, a fighter sweep, on 30 April. In May, it dropped the "Bomber" from its name, becoming the 505th Fighter Squadron. It flew escort for Boeing B-17 Flying Fortress and Consolidated B-24 Liberator heavy bombers during its first five weeks of operations, and afterwards flew escort missions to cover operations of medium and heavy bombers that struck strategic objectives, interdicted enemy lines of communication, and provided air support for ground forces. In June 1954, it began to receive updated P-51D models of the Mustang. The 339th Group was also the first AAF unit to be equipped with g-suits, which enabled its fighters to make tighter turns in dogfights.

On D-Day It provided fighter cover over the English Channel and the coast of Normandy for the landing forces. It strafed and dive bombed vehicles, locomotives, marshaling yards, flak batteries, and troops while Allied forces fought to break out of the beachhead in France. It attacked transportation targets during Operation Cobra, the July breakout at Saint Lo, and the subsequent Allied drive across France. It flew area patrols during Operation Market-Garden, the airborne landings attempting to secure a bridgehead across the Rhine in the Netherlands in September.

The squadron frequently strafed airfields and other targets of opportunity while on escort missions. (Note: These were named "Jackpot" missions, with fighters assigned a specific area to strafe. Freeman, p. 159.) It was awarded the Distinguished Unit Citation for its actions on escort missions on 10 and 11 September 1944. On the first day, after escorting bombers attacking a target in Germany, it attacked Erding Airfield, destroying or damaging enemy aircraft despite intense fire from antiaircraft guns and small arms. The following day it escorted a formation of bombers attacking Munich that was attacked by enemy interceptor aircraft, in the strongest defense put up by Luftflotte Reich since May. The 339th Group shot down fifteen enemy fighters and drove off the remaining attacking aircraft, while other elements attacked an airfield near Karlsruhe, encountering heavy fire, but damaging or destroying numerous aircraft parked on the field. (Note: The 339th Group was the only group in VIII Fighter Command to destroy more than 100 aircraft on the ground on two occasions. Both were in April 1945. Freeman, p. 249.)

The squadron escorted bombers to, and flew patrols over the battle area during the Battle of the Bulge, the German counterattack in the Ardennes in December 1944 through early January 1945. In March 1945 it supported Operation Varsity, the assault across the Rhine in Germany, patrolling the area to prevent German air attacks. It flew its last combat mission on 21 April 1945. The squadron was credited with 55 air to air victories during its year in combat.

In August and September 1945, the squadron transferred its planes to depots and many of its personnel were reassigned. The remaining squadron members sailed on the RMS Queen Mary in October. It was inactivated at the Port of Embarkation on 17 October 1945.

=== New York Air National Guard ===
The 505th Squadron was redesignated the 138th Fighter Squadron, and was allotted to the National Guard on 24 May 1946. It was organized at Hancock Field, Syracuse, New York, and extended federal recognition on 28 October 1947. The squadron was equipped with Republic F-47D Thunderbolts and was assigned initially to the 52d Fighter Wing, then in December 1948 to the 107th Fighter Group, with its training overseen by Continental Air Command. The mission of the 136th Fighter Squadron was to train and equip to be capable of immediate mobilization to perform its Federal mission and to function efficiently when called on by the State of New York to preserve peace, order and public safety.

In January 1950 the 138th became the first New York National Guard unit to receive jet aircraft, replacing its Thunderbolts with Republic F-84B Thunderjets over the next three months, Most of these planes came from the regular 20th Fighter Group at Shaw Air Force Base, South Carolina.

With the surprise invasion of South Korea on 25 June 1950, most of the nation's Air National Guard was federalized and placed on active duty. The 138th was retained by the State of New York to continue its federal mission to prepare for mobilization and its state missions as well. In 1951, Air Defense Command was authorized to bring Air National Guard squadrons with an air defense mission, like the 138th, on active duty within four hours of notice through newly installed "scramble lines".

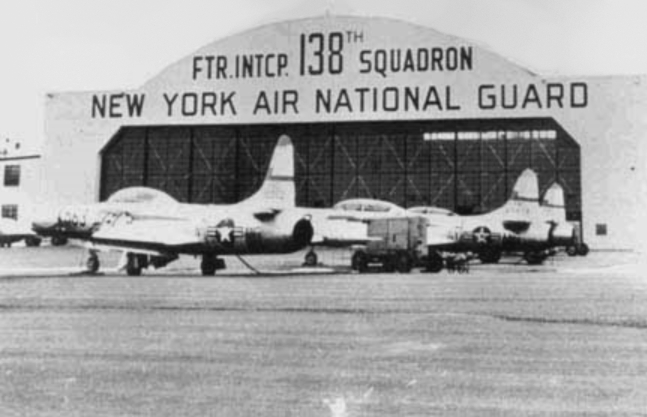
138th FIS F-94s in the 1950s

Between December 1950 and January 1951, the 138th transferred several F-84Bs to the Arizona Air National Guard's 197th Fighter Squadron at Luke Air Force Base, and at the end of 1951 the remainder were transferred to the federalized 127th Pilot Training Group, also at Luke. The Thunderjets were used for jet pilot transition training for pilots being deployed to Korea. In return, the 138th received F-51H Mustangs with were capable of extended air defense flights over all of New York state. In 1952, the 138th became one of the first Air National Guard squadrons to commence standing daylight runway alert. At least two aircraft from the squadron with pilots in their cockpits stood alert at the end of runway from one hour before sunrise to one hour after sunset every day of the year.

The air defense mission remained after the Korean War armistice and the unit resumed normal peacetime training and drills. In 1954, the Mustang was ending its service life and Air Defense Command (ADC) was re-equipping its fighter-interceptor squadrons with jet aircraft. The 138th received Lockheed F-94B Starfires, however the F-94 required a two-man aircrew, a pilot and an air observer to operate its radar equipment. The additional recruitment of guardsmen led to the units having a manning and capabilities problem. It was not until 1955 that a regular flow of graduates from the radar observer school began. (Note: This did not solve the problem, which persisted until the squadron converted to single seat F-86Hs in 1957. Adjutant General Report 1957, p. 97.) The squadron also added two North American TB-25 Mitchells to its strength to act as trainers for its radar observers.

In 1956, the 107th Fighter-Interceptor Wing was reorganized and redesignated the 107th Air Defense Wing. The 107th Fighter-Interceptor Group was redesignated the 107th Fighter Group (Air Defense) and moved from Niagara Falls Municipal Airport to Hancock Field on 1 May, with the 138th FIS being assigned. The North American F-86H Sabre replaced the F-94B Starfires in 1957.

==== Tactical Air Command ====
A major change to the squadron in 1958 was its transition from an air defense mission to a tactical fighter mission, with Tactical Air Command (TAC) becoming its gaining command on mobiliation. The 138th was redesignated the 138th Tactical Fighter Squadron. The new assignment involved a change in the squadron's training mission to include high-altitude interception, air-to-ground rocketry, ground strafing and tactical bombing. The 138th retained its F-86H Sabres. In 1960, the squadron received both the Governor's Air Trophy and the Commander's Trophy as the most outstanding unit in the New York Air National Guard. In addition, the Air Force Association named it the best F-86 unit in the country.

===== 1961 Berlin federalization =====
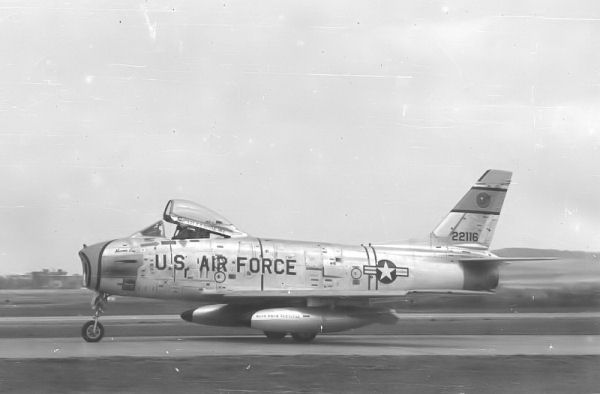
Squadron F-86H deployed at Phalsbourg AB (Note: Aircraft is North American F-86H-5-NA Sabre, serial 52-2116.)

During the summer of 1961, as the 1961 Berlin Crisis unfolded, the 138th was notified of its pending federalization and recall to active duty and told to achieve maximum operational readiness in as short a period as possible. On 1 October the it was federalized and assigned to the Massachusetts Air National Guard's 102d Tactical Fighter Wing, which called to active duty for twelve months. Between 28 and 30 October, the 102d departed Otis for Phalsbourg Air Base, France as part of Operation Stair Step. The wing deployed 78 F-86H Sabres. Since the F-86H lacked an air refueling capability, the squadron deployed via the World War II North Atlantic ferry route.

The squadron's mission in France was to provide close air support to Seventh United States Army and NATO ground forces and air interdiction with conventional weapons. It also had an air defense mission that required keeping its aircraft on armed 24 hour alert. Shortly after its arrival in France, the squadron began deploying to Wheelus Air Base Libya for gunnery training. (Note: Gunnery training for the wing was complicated by the 131st Tactical Fighter Squadron's flying F-86H-1 models, equipped with .50 caliber machine guns, while the 138th and 101st Tactical Fighter Squadrons flew later models armed with 20mm cannon. Their ballistics were incompatible and the two types could not be mixed on gunnery training missions. McAuliffe, p. 380.) During its time in Europe, the squadron participated in USAFE and NATO exercises. In Operation Squadron Exchange squadron members joined Jagdgeschwader 72, a Luftwaffe wing flying F-86s at Leck Air Base, West Germany, near the Danish border, while Luftwaffe ground and support crews of the 72nd operated with the 102nd Wing at Phalsbourg.

On 7 May 1962, the squadron began planning redeployment to the United States during the summer, with the last Sabres departing on 20 July. Some Guardsmen, primarily pilots, volunteered to remain on active duty as the cadre of the 480th Tactical Fighter Squadron, which would operated from Phalsbourg with Republic F-84F Thunderstreaks, began to arrive. The unit's planes returned to the United States in July 1962 and the squadron was returned to state control on 1 September.

===== Return to state control =====
Upon its return to state control, the 107th Group moved back to Niagara Falls, and the National Guard element there was authorized to expand to a group level. The 174th Tactical Fighter Group was federally recognized on 1 September 1962. The 138th became the group's flying squadron. Other units assigned into the group were the 174th Material Squadron, 174th Combat Support Squadron, and the 174th USAF Dispensary.

The squadron remained equipped with the F-86H and continued normal peacetime training and exercises. In the summer of 1965, the squadron took part in Exercise Oneida Bear II at Fort Drum, which involved some 6,500 soldiers of the regular Army, the Army Reserve and the National Guard. Squadron aircraft provided close air support to both aggressor and friendly forces during the exercise, and were engaged in realistic tactical air strikes. In the exercise, conducted by the First United States Army, the Second Brigade of the Army's [[5th Infantry Regiment (United States}|5th Infantry Regiment]] was opposed by an aggressor force of selected Army National Guard and reserve Units. The 174th Group's pilots flew 77 sorties for a total of 114 hours without a single abort.

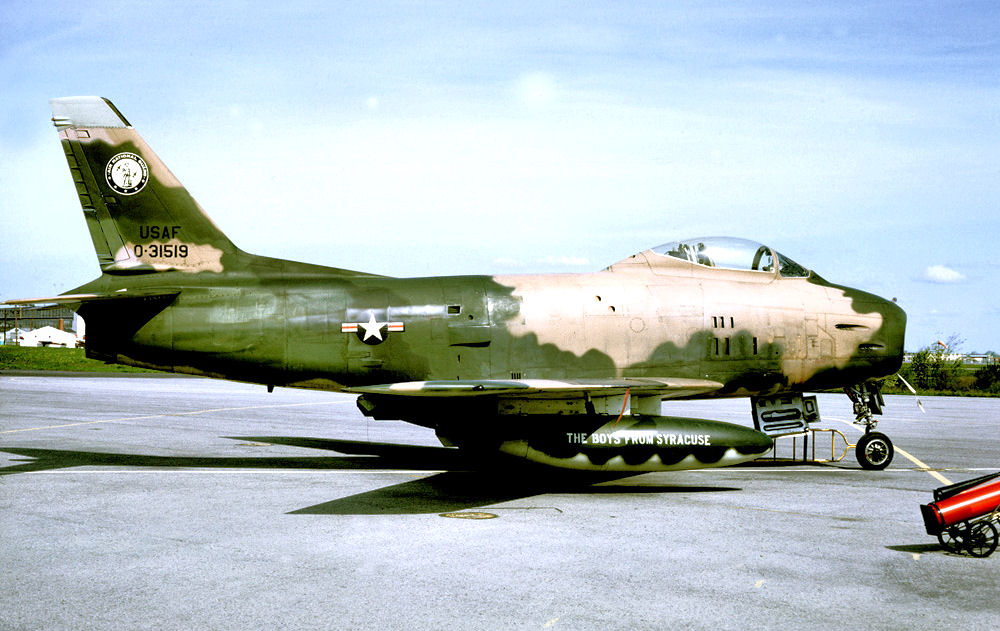
Squadron F-86 Sabre in Vietnam War camouflage about 1966 (Note: Aircraft is north American F-86H-10-NH Sabre, serial 53-1519. This plane is on static display at Hancock Field. Dirkx, Marco (18 April 2024). "1953 USAF Serial Numbers". Joe Baugher’s Serial Number List.)

The squadron trained at Ramey Air Force Base, Puerto Rico, in early 1967 in an all service amphibious and airborne exercise. A detachment of unit pilots and support personnel participated. Twelve F-86H aircraft participated with three Lockheed C-130 Hercules for equipment and personnel support. All types of tactical air missions were flown. A special firepower demonstration was accomplished. Later in 1967 Operation Sentry Post I was held in August. This was a joint Air National Guard – TAC Exercise. Twelve F-86Hs were flown and squadron pilots worked with radar flying air-to-air and air-to-ground gunnery with and without forward air control (FAC) type missions. A total of 204 sorties and 245, hours were flown in this operation.

===== Vietnam activation =====
In 1968, the squadron was federalized and placed on active duty. It was alerted for active duty on 11 April 1968, partially mobilized on 13 May and deployed to Cannon Air Force Base, Clovis, New Mexico. The squadron's mission was to train forward air controllers for service in Vietnam. The FACs flew a light observation aircraft at low altitudes, visually observing enemy installations and movements and providing on-the-spot directions for fighters and bombers. The FAC dictated the type of ordnance to be delivered, observed the strike, and evaluated its effectiveness. The squadron gave FAC's in training actual experience in fighter aircraft so that they would be fully apprised of the requirements of the men they would be directing in combat in South Vietnam.

On arrival at Cannon along with Maryland Air National Guard units, they comprised the 140th Tactical Fighter Wing. Originally based in Denver, Colorado, headquarters of the 140th moved to Cannon ith the deployment of the 140th Tactical Fighter Group to active duty in Vietnam. Only the group Headquarters, the 138th Squadron, and the 174th Consolidated Aircraft Maintenance Squadron were mobilized. The unit was inactivated on 20 December 1968, and all members reverted to Air National Guard drill status.

===== Close Air Support =====
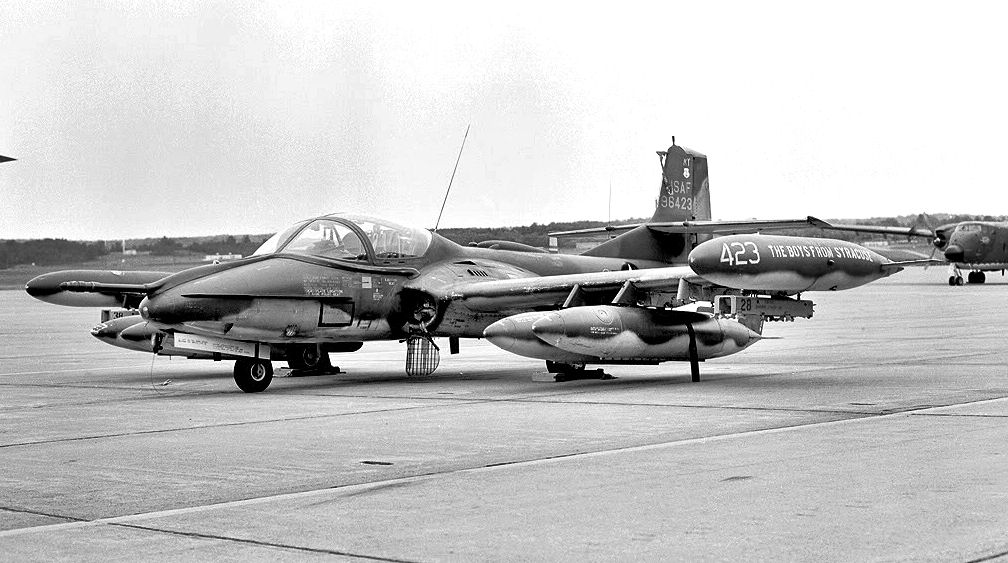
138th TFS Cessna A-37B Dragonfly 69-6423, 1974

During 1970, the 174th began retiring its F-86H Sabres after over a decade of service, the squadron flying the last USAF/ANG Sabre sortie on 30 September. Replacing the Sabre was the Cessna A-37B Dragonfly and a newly conceived close air support tactical fighter mission in a ground insurgency environment which were gained by combat experience in Vietnam.

After a decade of routine peacetime exercises and training with the A-37, in 1979 the 174th began a transition to the Fairchild Republic A-10A Thunderbolt II close air support fighter. With the arrival of the A-10, the 174th became a Wing on 1 July 1979. The wing was one of three Air National Guard units equipped with the A-10 as part of the "Total Force" concept which equipped ANG units with front-line USAF aircraft. In 1980, after the transition to the A-10 was completed, the 138th deployed to Savannah Air National Guard Base, Georgia. On arrival, the unit was given sealed orders directing them to a remote, forward operational location and operate combat sorties, fully loaded with live ordnance. Not only was the 174th's combat readiness put to the optimum peacetime test, but the unit's mobility was tested to the fullest. In response, an additional six A-10s were assigned to it, making the squadron the Air National Guard's only "super" squadron, with 24 aircraft.

With the transition complete, the unit deployed eight A-10 aircraft from Syracuse, non-stop to a forward operation location in West Germany. In exercise Cornet Sail, the 138th demonstrated for the first time the ability of an Air National Guard or Air Force Reserve unit to deploy this advanced aircraft in this manner. Combat readiness in West Germany was achieved 12 hours after departing Hancock Field.

In 1984, the unit deployed to Exercise Air Warrior at the National Training Center, Fort Irwin, California; a three-week deployment to Lechfeld Air Base, West Germany and with the NY ANG 107th Fighter-Interceptor Group at Goose Air Base, Labrador.

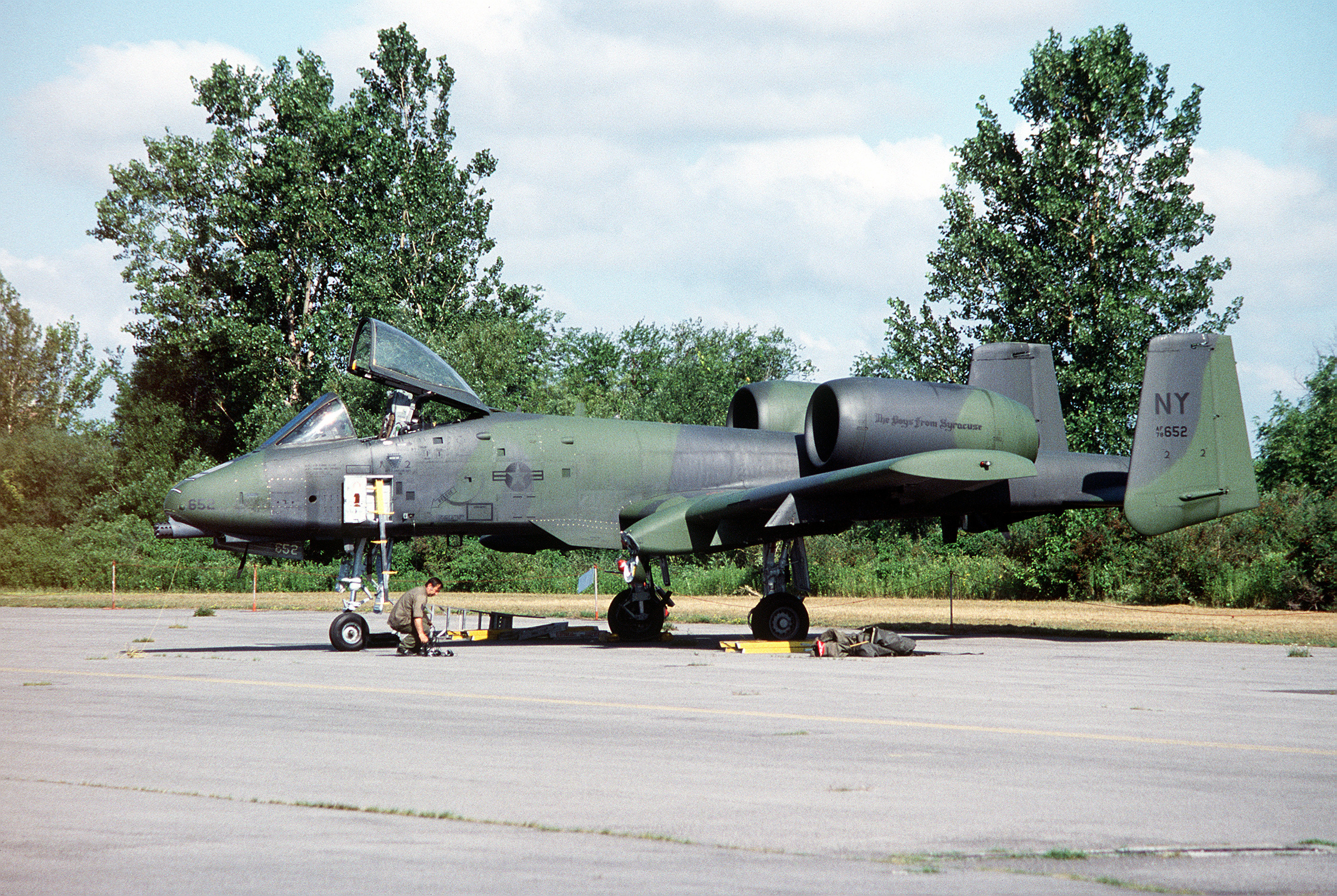
A 138th TFS A-10A at Hancock Field, 1981.

The 174th also was among the first A-10 close support aircraft organizations to provide temporary tactical air defense support from Howard Air Force Base, Panama when the unit deployed to Howard in March 1985 when runway construction precluded the use of the LTV A-7D Corsair IIs that normally fulfilled the tactical air defense duties of the Panama Canal. Shortly afterward, it deployed to Alaska for the first time. The 138th completed the 2,700-mile flight to Eielson Air Force Base without external navigation aids.

As in past years, continuing NATO deployments to West Germany in the late 1980s saw squadron personnel training and living side-by-side with their West German Air Force counterparts as they would in a combat situation. The squadron began 1988 on a high note when the Air Force announced the wing would convert from the A-10 to the Block 10 F-16A/B Fighting Falcon. With the Block 10 F-16, the 174th became the first Air Force organization to fly the Fighting Falcon with a close air support mission.

The first F-16 aircraft started arriving in late 1988. These aircraft were passed down from regular USAF units who were upgrading to the F-16C/D model. During 1989 the 138th TFS was chosen as a test unit for a close air support version of the F-16. The aircraft were the only F-16s ever to be equipped with this weapon, intended for use against a variety of battlefield targets, including armor with the 30 mm gun pod.

===== Operation Desert Storm =====
In 1991, the 138th deployed to the Persian Gulf with 516 members in support of Operation Desert Storm. The 138th was one of only two Air National Guard units to fly combat missions during Operation Desert Storm. The close air support project however proved to be a miserable failure. Precision aiming was impossible for several reasons: the pylon mount wasn't as steady as the A-10's rigid mounting; the F-16 flies much faster than an A-10, giving the pilots too little time approaching the target; firing the gun shook the aircraft harshly and made it impossible to control the targeting; the essential CCIP (constantly computed impact point) software was unavailable. The pilots ended up using the gun as an area effect weapon, spraying multiple targets with ammunition, producing an effect rather like a cluster bomb. It took only a couple of days of this before they gave up, unbolted the gun pods, and went back to dropping real cluster bombs – which did the job more effectively.

The unit received the Air Force Outstanding Unit Award, with the "V" device, during Operation Desert Storm; the Air Force Association Outstanding Unit Award, and the National Guard Association's Best Family Support Center Award.

==== Air Combat Command ====
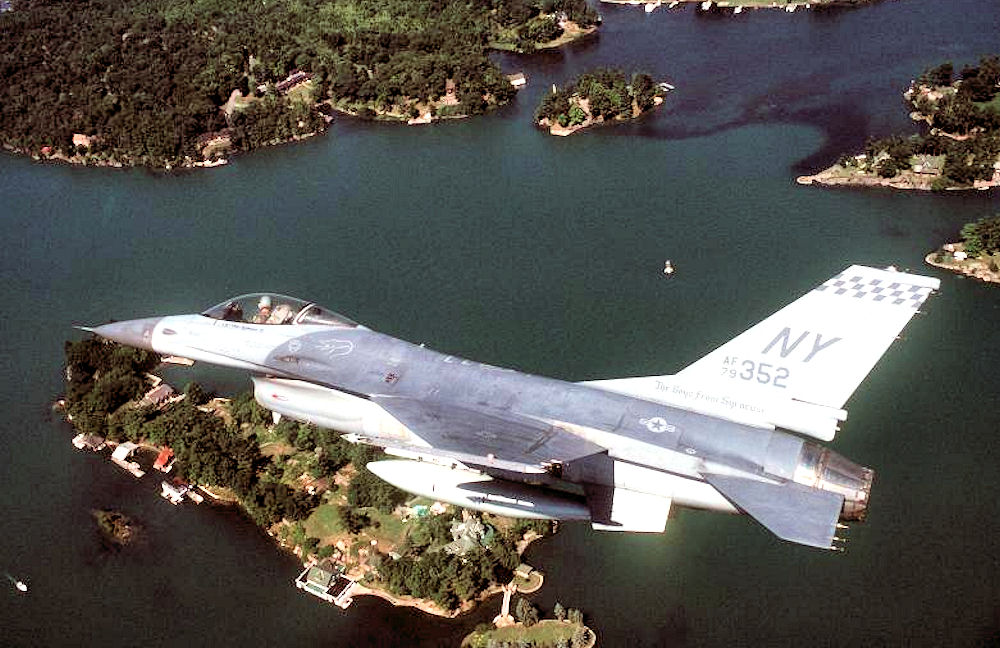
138th TFS – General Dynamics F-16A Block 10 Fighting Falcon 79-0352

In March 1992, with the end of the Cold War, the squadron was redesignated the 138th Fighter Squadron. Shortly thereafter, the 174th Wing was reorganized under the Objective Wing organization and the 138th was assigned to the new 174th Operations Group. In June, Tactical Air Command was inactivated as part of the Air Force reorganization after the end of the Cold War. It was replaced by Air Combat Command (ACC).

In 1993 the squadron started trading in its old Block 10 F-16 A/B models for newer Block 30 F-16C/D aircraft configured for Tactical Air Support. In that process the squadron had the 'honor' of sending the first F-16 to Aerospace Maintenance and Regeneration Center storage. This happened on 20 July 1993, when an F-16A (#79-0340) was flown to Davis-Monthan Air Force Base, Arizona for flyable storage. Although these aircraft were only 13 years old, they were put into storage due to more modern models becoming available and Block 10 wasn't needed any longer by the USAF. The general mission for the squadron remained unchanged with this transition.

Also in 1993, the 138th became the first US unit to have a female F-16 fighter pilot, Jackie Parker, in 1993 immediately after combat roles were opened to females.

In June 1995, the unit deployed for 30 days rotation to Incirlik Air Base, Turkey as part of Operation Provide Comfort, assisting in the enforcement the No Fly Zone over Northern Iraq.

In mid-1996, the Air Force, in response to budget cuts, and changing world situations, began experimenting with Air Expeditionary organizations. The Air Expeditionary Force (AEF) concept was developed that would mix Active-Duty, Reserve and Air National Guard elements into a combined force. Instead of entire permanent units deploying as "Provisional" as in the 1991 Gulf War, Expeditionary units are composed of "aviation packages" from several wings, including active-duty Air Force, the Air Force Reserve Command and the Air National Guard, would be married together to carry out the assigned deployment rotation.

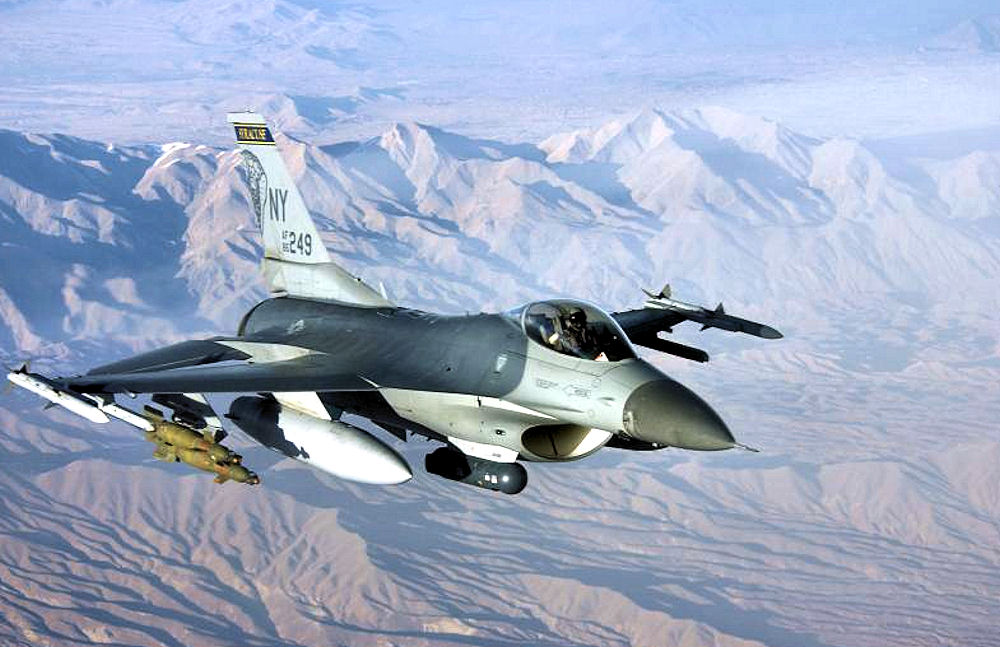
138th Expeditionary Fighter Squadron F-16C 86-0249 over Afghanistan in support of Operation Enduring Freedom on 29 November 2003

The 138th Expeditionary Fighter Squadron was first formed and deployed in August 1996 for Operation Northern Watch, a US European Command Combined Task Force that was responsible for enforcing the United Nations mandated no-fly zone above the 36th parallel in Iraq. This mission was a successor to Operation Provide Comfort which also entailed support for the Iraqi Kurds.

During 1996–97, the squadron deployed to Andøya Air Station, Norway as part of the "Adventure Express 97" NATO exercise. In 1998, the 174th FW deployed to Tyndall Air Force Base, Florida, for Exercise Combat Archer and to the Dugway Proving Ground, Utah, to participate in Exercise Global Patriot 98.

Only six years later, in 1999, the 138th changed block types once more, sending its Block 30s to the Illinois Air National Guard's 170th Fighter Squadron and receiving older block 25 F-16s from the Texas Air National Guard's 182d Fighter Squadron. This meant changing again from the General Electric engine to the Pratt & Whitney.

An AEF deployment to Prince Sultan Air Base, Saudi Arabia resulted in the formation of the 138th Expeditionary Fighter Squadron in early 2000. Operation Southern Watch was an operation which was responsible for enforcing the United Nations mandated no-fly zone below the 32d parallel in Iraq. This mission was initiated mainly to cover for attacks of Iraqi forces on the Iraqi Shi’ite Muslims. The squadron returned to the Block 30 Aircraft in 2004, receiving aircraft from the 50th Fighter Wing at Spangdahlem Air Base, Germany shifting from engine type once more.

As part of the global war on terrorism, the 138th EFS deployed twice to Balad Air Base, Iraq in 2006 and 2008.

==== MQ-9 Reaper and Attack Mission ====
By 2008 the squadron prepared to transition to the General Atomics MQ-9 Reaper. In October 2009, the 174th Fighter Wing cut the ribbon on its new MQ-9 Reaper maintenance school, where it trains technicians from across the country, from all military branches. In 2010, the last F-16s departed Hancock Field, as the squadron became the first in the National Guard to fly the Reaper. In October 2014, the 108th Attack Squadron was activated at Hancock to assume the training of MQ-9 technicians, freeing the 138th to focus on operational missions.

By 2020, the 138th Attack Squadron reached 60,000 hours of MQ-9 flight time. In 2022, the squadron won the Reaper Smoke exercise. This exercise evaluates crews on a number of criteria, specifically identified because of their critical importance to everyday, real-world mission requirements.

== Lineage ==
- Constituted as the 484th Bombardment Squadron (Dive) on 3 August 1942

Activated on 10 August 1942
Redesignated 505th Fighter-Bomber Squadron on 10 August 1943
Redesignated 505th Fighter Squadron on 30 May 1944
Inactivated on 17 October 1945

- Redesignated 138th Fighter Squadron and allotted to the National Guard on 24 May 1946
- Organized on 26 September 1947

Received federal recognition on 28 October 1947
Redesignated 138th Fighter-Interceptor Squadron on 1 October 1952
Redesignated 138th Tactical Fighter Squadron (Day) on 10 November 1958
Federalized and placed on active duty on 1 October 1961
Released from active duty and returned to New York state control on 31 August 1962
Redesignated 138th Tactical Fighter Squadron c. 15 October 1962
Federalized and placed on active duty on 11 April 1968
Released from active duty and returned to New York state control on 20 December 1968
Federalized and placed on active duty on 20 November 1990
Released from active duty and returned to New York state control on 31 March 1991
Redesignated 138th Fighter Squadron on 16 March 1992
Redesignated 138th Attack Squadron on 9 September 2012

=== Assignments ===
- 339th Bombardment Group (later 339th Fighter-Bomber Group, 339th Fighter Group), 10 Aug 1942 – 17 Oct 1945
- 52d Fighter Wing, 28 October 1947
- 107th Fighter Group (later 107th Fighter-Interceptor Group, 107th Fighter Group, 107th Tactical Fighter Group), 8 December 1948
- 102d Tactical Fighter Wing, 1 October 1961
- 174th Tactical Fighter Group, 1 September 1962
- 140th Tactical Fighter Wing, 11 April 1968
- 174th Tactical Fighter Group (later 174th Tactical Fighter Wing, 174th Fighter Wing), 20 December 1968
- 174th Operations Group, c. 1 January 1993 – present

=== Stations ===
- Hunter Field, Georgia, 10 August 1942
- Drew Field, Florida, 6 February 1943
- Walterboro Army Air Field, South Carolina, 3 July 1943
- Rice Army Air Field, California, 17 September 1943 — 9 March 1944
- RAF Fowlmere (AAF-378), England, 9 April 1944 — 8 October 1945
- Camp Myles Standish, Massachusetts, 16–17 Oct 1945
- Hancock Field, 26 September 1947
- Phalsbourg Air Base, France, 1 October 1961
- Hancock Field, New York, 31 August 1962
- Cannon Air Force Base, New Mexico, 13 May 1968
- Hancock Field (later Hancock Field Air National Guard Base), New York, 20 December 1969 – present

==== New York Air National Guard Deployments ====
- 1961 Berlin Crisis federalization, 1 October 1961 – 31 August 1962
- Vietnam War federalization, New Mexico, 13 May 1968 – 20 December 1969
- 1990/1991 Gulf Crisis federalization (Operated from Prince Sultan Air Base, Saudi Arabia, November 1990 – March 1991)
- Operation Provide Comfort II (Elements operated from Incirlik Air Base, Turkey, May–September 1995)
- Operation Northern Watch (AEF)(Elements operated from Incirlik Air Base, Turkey, August–November 1996)
- Operation Southern Watch (AEF) (Elements operated from Prince Sultan Air Base, Al Kharj, Saudi Arabia, February–April 2000)
- Operation Iraqi Freedom (AEF) (Elements operated from Balad Air Base, Iraq, September–December 2006, June–August 2008)
- Operation Enduring Freedom (AEF) (Elements operated from Bagram Airfield, Afghanistan, July 2010 – January 2011)

=== Aircraft ===
- Douglas A-24 Banshee, 1942–1943
- Bell P-39 Airacobra, 1943–1944
- North American P-51 Mustang (later F-51), 1944–1945, 1951–1954
- Republic F-47D Thunderbolt, 1947–1950
- Republic F-84B Thunderjet, 1950–1951
- Lockheed F-94B Starfire, 1954–1957
- North American F-86H Sabre, 1957–1970
- Cessna A-37B Dragonfly, 1970–1979
- Fairchild Republic A-10A Thunderbolt II, 1979–1989
- General Dynamics F-16A Fighting Falcon, 1989–1993
- General Dynamics F-16C Fighting Falcon, 1993–2010
- General Atomics MQ-9 Reaper, 2010–present
