= Hancock Field Air National Guard Base =

NY ANG base at Syracuse Hancock International Airport

- Near Syracuse, New York in the United States of America
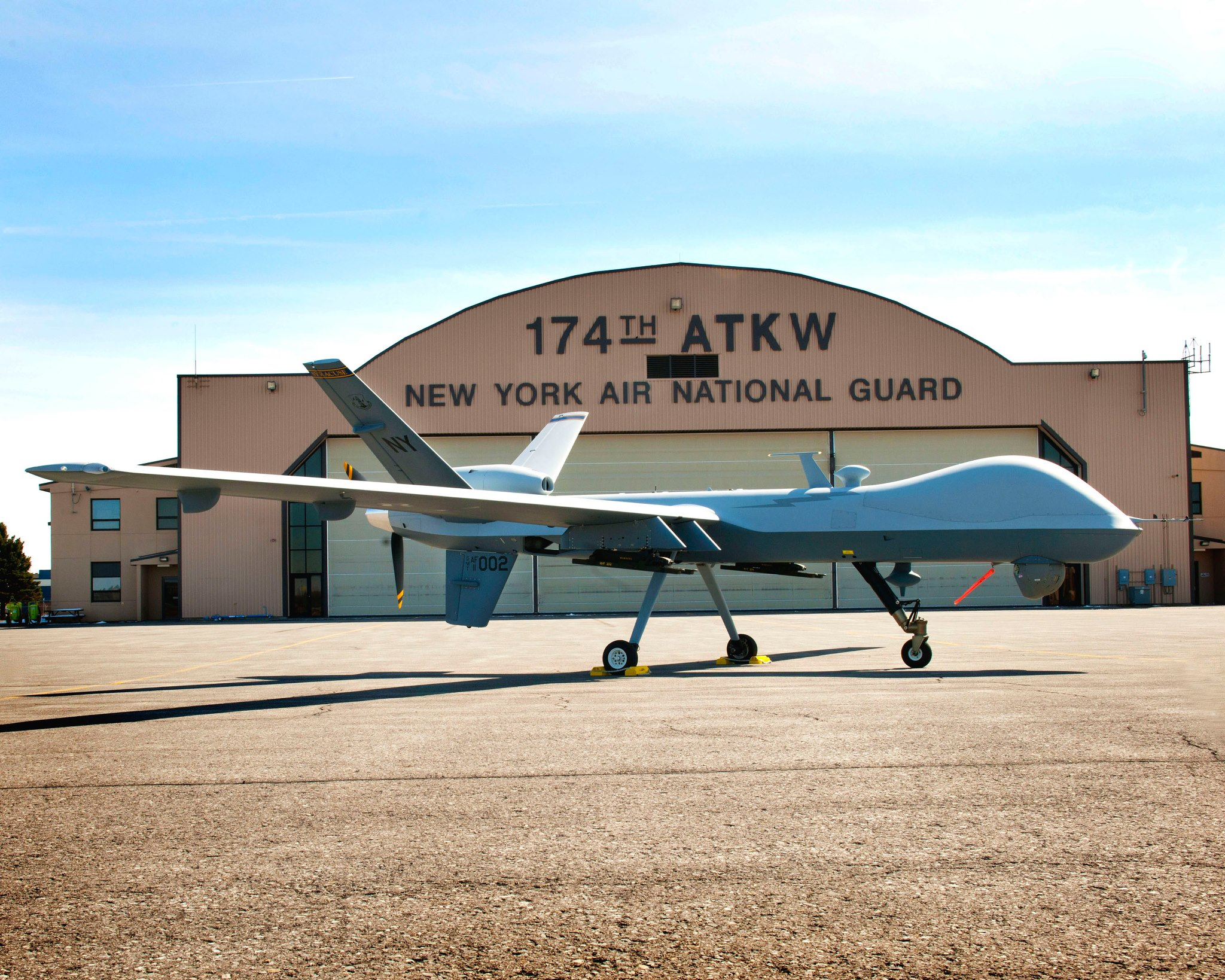
- A MQ-9A Reaper of the 174th Attack Wing on tarmac at Hancock Field ANGB.

Site information
- Type: Air National Guard Base
- Owner: Department of Defense
- Operator: US Air Force (USAF)
- Controlled by: New York Air National Guard
- Condition: Operational

Location
- Location in the United States
- Coordinates: 43°06′41″N 076°07′25″W

Site history
- Built: 1942
- In use: 1942 – present

Garrison information
- Garrison: 174th Attack Wing (Host)

Airfield information
- Identifiers: IATA: SYR, ICAO: KSYR, FAA LID: SYR, WMO: 725190
- Elevation: 128.3 metres (421 ft) AMSL
Runways
Direction	Length and surface
10/28	2,744.1 metres (9,003 ft) Asphalt
15/33	2,286 metres (7,500 ft) Asphalt
- Airfield shared with Syracuse Hancock International Airport; Source: Federal Aviation Administration

Hancock Field Air National Guard Base is a United States Air Force base, co-located with Syracuse Hancock International Airport. It is located 4.6 miles (7.4 km) north-northeast of Syracuse, New York, at 6001 East Molloy Road in Mattydale. The installation consists of approximately 350 acres (1.4 km^{2}) of flight line, aircraft ramp and support facilities on the south side of the airport.

Hancock Field is the home station of the New York Air National Guard's 174th Attack Wing (174 ATW), and the 274th Air Support Operations Squadron (274 ASOS). Both units are operationally gained by Air Combat Command (ACC).

The base employs approximately 2,000 personnel consisting of full-time Active Guard and Reserve (AGR), Air Reserve Technicians (ART) and traditional part-time Air National Guardsmen. ANG personnel maintain the BAK-14 arresting gear on the airport's primary runway for emergency use by military tactical jet aircraft. They also operate an Air Force crash fire department that provides Aircraft Rescue and Fire Fighting (ARFF), structural Fire/Rescue, and Emergency Services to the National Guard Base and the civilian Syracuse Hancock International Airport.

On 11 August 2008, it was reported that the 174th Fighter Wing would replace all F-16 Fighting Falcon fighter aircraft with MQ-9 Reaper unmanned combat aircraft. On 6 March 2010, the last 2 F-16Cs departed Hancock Field marking the end of F-16 aircraft operations at the base. Aircraft 85-1570 and 85-1561 made three low passes for the assembled crowd gathered to commemorate the end of manned aviation for the Wing. The unit then transitioned to the remotely piloted MQ-9 Reaper, and was re-designated as an Attack Wing with the new aircraft.

== History ==
=== Origins ===
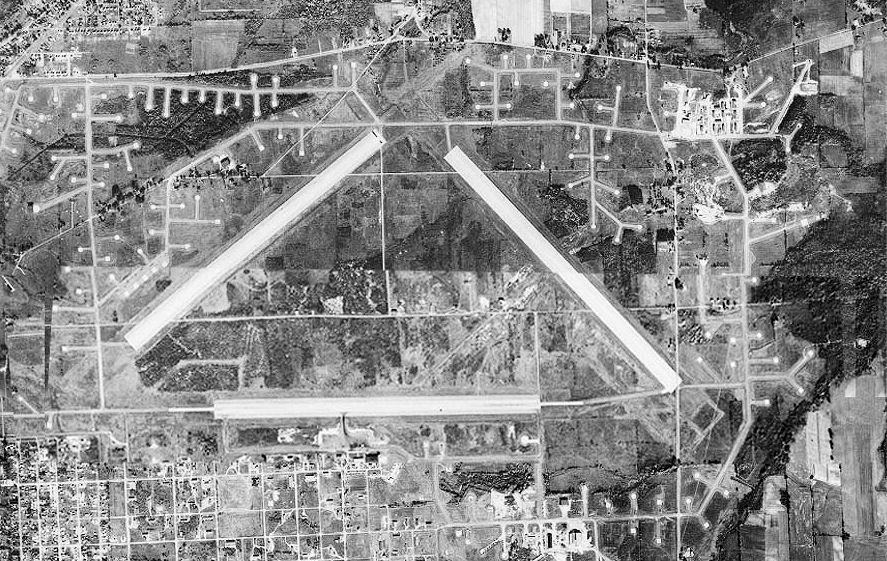
1951 airphoto of Hancock Field

With the outbreak of World War II, many believed that the East Coast was vulnerable to enemy attack. On December 31, 1941, 24 days after the attack on Pearl Harbor, the Office of the Chief of the Army Air Force authorized the construction of an air base at Syracuse, New York.

A 3,500 acre parcel located north of the city was selected, displacing several inhabited farms. Authorized on 1 January 1942, three 5,500 foot runways were built, at a cost to the Army of more than $16,000,000. These runways were constructed over existing asparagus beds, which continue producing asparagus to this day. The first military personnel arrived on the airfield on 16 August 1942.

Syracuse Army Air Base (a.k.a. Mattydale Bomber Base) was intended to be a First Air Force all-purpose station, but it became a personnel activation station instead and provided first phase training for recruits. Beginning in 1943, the First Concentration Command, later known as the Air Technical Service Command, used the base to assemble and test B-24 Liberator aircraft, and then were sent to fly bombing missions over England. The airfield had an extraordinary large number of hardstands were used for aircraft in transient status. The first airmen to train at this base were known as The Boys from Syracuse. They used the base as a staging and storage area, repairing and re-outfitting the B-17 and B-24 aircraft that had been used in World War II. One of the first units to pass through Syracuse was the 305th Bombardment Group, flying B-17s and led by Colonel Curtis E. Lemay, who later became the Air Force Chief of Staff.

On July 22, 1946, the City of Syracuse took over the Mattydale Bomber Base on an interim lease. In 1948, the base was dedicated as a commercial airfield. The Clarence E. Hancock Airport opened to the public on September 17, 1949.

The New York Air National Guard 174th Fighter Wing was formed at Hancock Field on October 28, 1947 as the 138th Fighter Squadron. The squadron was a re-designation of the World War II 505th Fighter Squadron, a component of the VIII Fighter Command 339th Fighter Group that had fought in the European Theater of Operations. The 138th FS was the first post-World War II New York Air National Guard flying unit. It initially flew P-47D Thunderbolts. Over the past 60 years, the unit has been based at Hancock Field, operating fighter aircraft. The wing has been awarded the Air Force Outstanding Unit Award in 1981, 1983, 1986, and 1990.

=== Air Defense Command ===
The United States Air Force exercised a right of return to the Syracuse Army Air Base in 1951 and activated Hancock Field on 15 February 1952 under Air Defense Command (ADC). The base was renamed Syracuse Air Force Station on 1 December 1953. The 4624th Air Base Squadron was activated as the host unit at Hancock Field. Upgraded to the 4624th Support Group on 1 January 1960, it remained the base support organization until Hancock Field's inactivation as an active-duty air force facility on 31 December 1983

Eastern Air Defense Force moved the 32d Air Division to the new station on 15 February 1952 from Stewart AFB. Initially, it assumed responsibility for an area including Maine, Vermont, Massachusetts, New Hampshire, and part of New York, using a manual control center. It also supervised the construction of the SAGE blockhouses and the installation and testing of the SAGE electronic and data processing equipment which, when made operational made the air defense system of the 32d AD obsolete. The Division then was moved to Dobbins AFB, Georgia on 15 November 1958.

==== SAGE Data/Combat Center ====
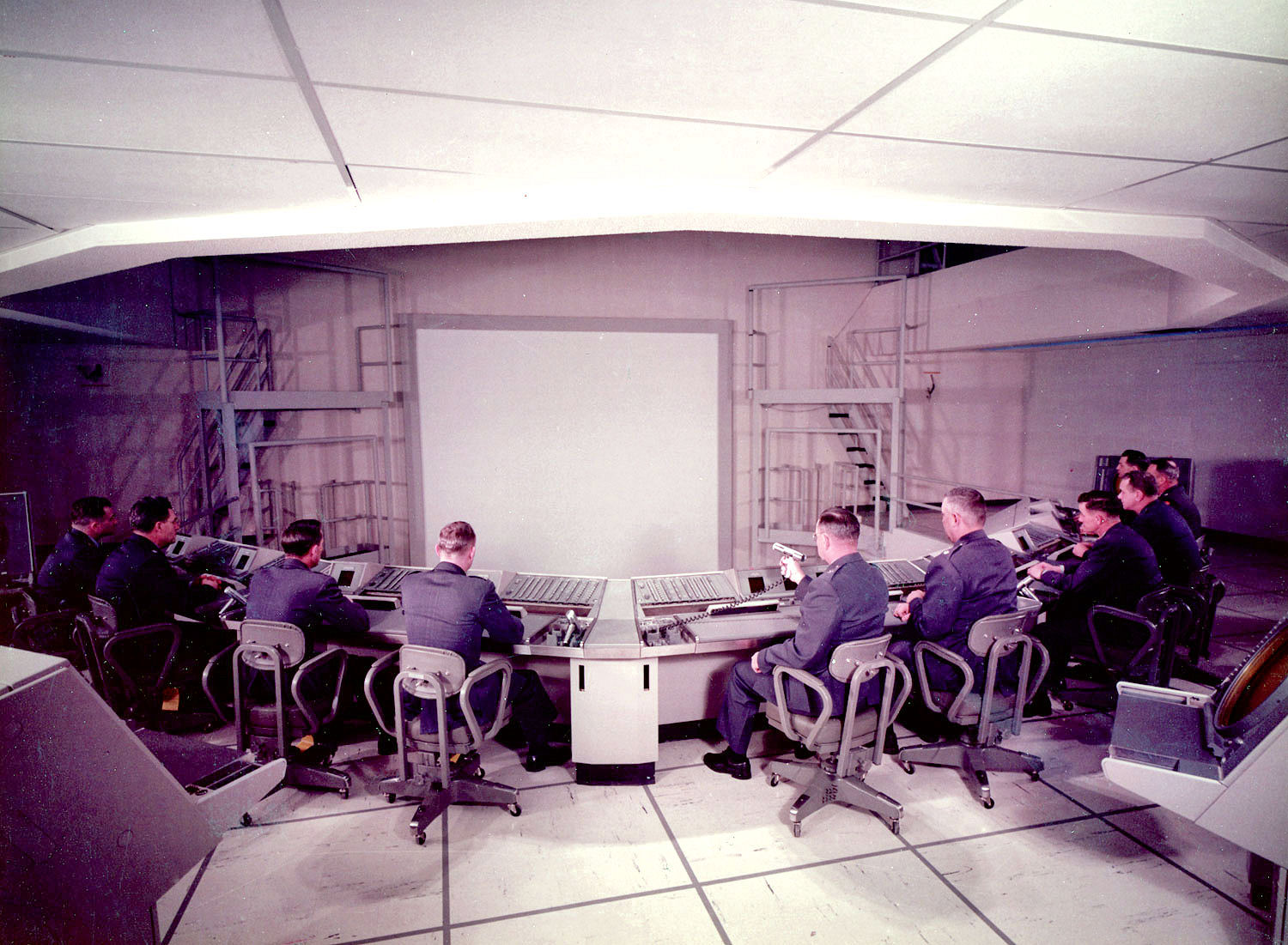
SAGE Combat Center CC-01

In 1958 a Semi Automatic Ground Environment (SAGE) Data Center (DC-03) and Combat Center (CC-01) was established at Syracuse, located about 1.4 miles (2.3 km) 43°07′19″N 076°06′01″W north-northwest of the ANG facility.

The SAGE system was a network linking Air Force (and later FAA) General Surveillance Radar stations into a centralized center for Air Defense, intended to provide early warning and response for a Soviet nuclear attack. This automated control system was used by NORAD for tracking and intercepting enemy bomber aircraft. In the later versions the system could automatically direct aircraft to an interception by sending instructions directly to the aircraft's autopilot.

Data was collected at Syracuse from over 100 different sources such as radar, human volunteers and aircraft sightings. This information was collated and forwarded via telephone communication lines to the Data Center (DC). The information was interpreted by the computer and displayed on a cathode ray tube display screen. The display, while similar to a radar screen, was extremely versatile. The operator of the terminal could pull up past positions of aircraft or missiles, as well as project future locations. In addition, the system used another feature advanced for its time: a light gun. The gun was used by the operators to point at an aircraft on the screen, and the computer would respond by displaying related identification information about that aircraft. The system has the distinction of being the largest (physical size) computer ever created.

DC-03/CC-01 had two separate computers, the second serving as a "hot standby" in case the active computer failed. With this backup, availability was an unprecedented 99.6%, when many other computers from that era failed every few hours. The computer weighed 300 tons and typically occupied one floor of a windowless 4-story concrete blockhouse. On another floor, dozens of Air Force operators watched their display screens and waited for signs of enemy activity.

SAGE was never designed to counter a space or missile threat. It was designed to counter the air threat. In the last years of its use, replacement vacuum tubes had to be purchased from Soviet-bloc countries where they were still being manufactured.

Command and Control of DC-03/CC-01 was initially under the Syracuse Air Defense Sector (SADS) which was activated under the 32d AD on 15 August 1958. The SADS was a designational of the 4624th Air Defense Wing which was activated at Syracuse ADS on 1 October 1956. The SADS was inactivated on 4 September 1963 and merged with the Boston Air Defense Sector (BADS), with control of DC-03/CC-01 coming under the BADS. It was again reassigned to the 35th Air Division upon BADS's inactivation on 1 April 1966. On 19 November 1969, the 35th AD was inactivated, and control was reassigned to the 21st Air Division at Syracuse AFS. In 1979 Hancock Field came under Tactical Air Command (TAC) jurisdiction with the inactivation of Aerospace Defense Command and the creation of ADTAC. Both DC-03 and the 21st AD were inactivated on 23 September 1983 when technology advances allowed the Air Force to shut down SAGE and transitioned to the 21st North American Aerospace Defense Region's new Northeast Region Operations Control Center (NE ROCC) at Griffiss AFB, New York.

The remaining ADTAC operations at Syracuse were moved to Griffiss AFB on 1 December 1983 and active Air Force use of Hancock Field ended on 31 December. Today, an Army switching center had been located on the 3rd floor of the old SAGE DC/CC blockhouse. It is rumored to be slated for demolition to accommodate another runway.

==== Known ADCOM units assigned ====
- 21st ADCOM Region, Designated and activated, 8 December 1978

Transferred to ADTAC as 21st NORAD Region, 1 October 1979-31 December 1983

- 32d Air Division, Reassigned, 12 February 1952 – 15 August 1958
- 26th Air Division, Reassigned, 15 August 1958 – 16 June 1964
- 35th Air Division, Organized, 1 April 1966 – 19 November 1969
- 21st Air Division, Activated, 19 November 1969

Transferred to ADTAC, 1 October 1979-31 August 1983

- 4624th Air Defense Wing, Activated, 1 October 1956

Re-designated: Syracuse Air Defense Sector,1 October 1956-4 September 1963

- 4624th Support Group, Activated, 1 January 1960 – 1 September 1963
- 4789th Air Base Group, Activated, 1 May 1971

Transferred to ADTAC, 1 October 1979-31 December 1983

- 672d Aircraft Control and Warning Squadron, Activated on 1 December 1956 – 1 July 1957
- 644th Radar Squadron, Activated 1 October 1954 – 1 July 1955
- 907th Radar Squadron, Activated on 26 May 1953 – 1 April 1955
- 4673d Ground Observation Squadron, Reassigned on 15 February 1952 – 15 August 1958

== Based units ==
Flying and notable non-flying units based at Hancock Field Air National Guard Base.

=== United States Air Force ===
Air National Guard

- New York Air National Guard
  - 174th Attack Wing
    - 152nd Air Operations Group
      - 274th Air Support Operations Squadron
      - Air and Space Communication Squadron
      - Air Intelligence Squadron
      - Combat Operations Squadron
    - 174th Operations Group
      - 108th Attack Squadron – MQ-9A Reaper
      - 138th Attack Squadron – MQ-9A Reaper
      - 174th Operation Support Squadron
    - 174th Maintenance Group
    - 174th Mission Support Group
    - 174th Medical Group

== See also ==
- Columbia College-Hancock Field
- New York World War II Army Airfields
- List of USAF Aerospace Defense Command General Surveillance Radar Stations
- Eastern Air Defense Force (Air Defense Command)
- 32nd Air Division (United States)
