= White Plains Armory =

- U.S. National Register of Historic Places
- New York State Register of Historic Places
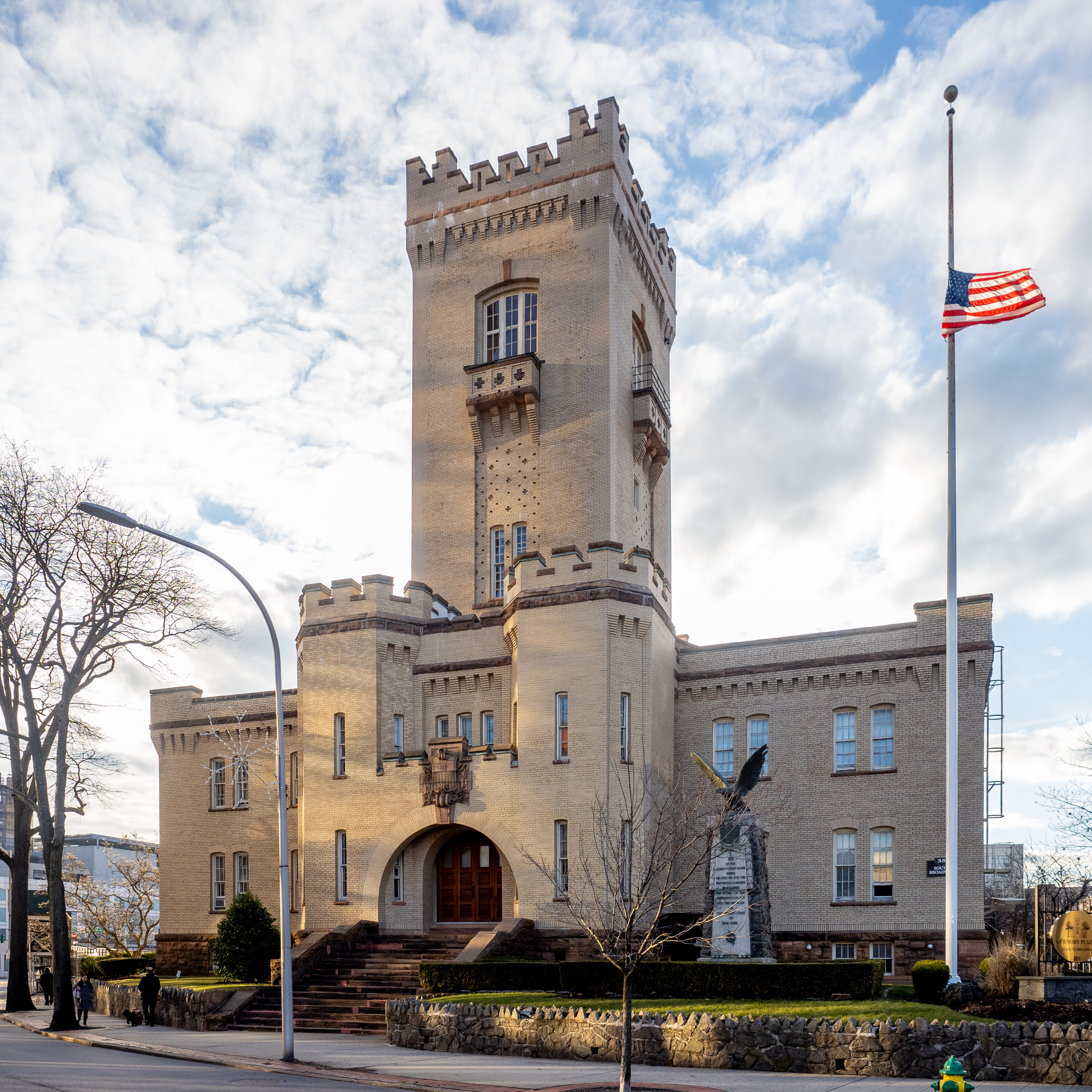
- The White Plains Armory in Winter 2023

- Location within New York Location within the United States
- Location: 35 S. Broadway, White Plains, New York
- Coordinates: 41°1′53″N 73°45′47″W
- Area: 0.3 acres (0.12 ha)
- Built: 1909-10
- Architect: Franklin B. Ware
- Architectural style: Castellated
- NRHP reference No.: 80002796
- NYSRHP No.: 11943.000691

Significant dates
- Added to NRHP: April 16, 1980
- Designated NYSRHP: June 23, 1980

The White Plains Armory is a historic building in White Plains, New York, in Westchester County.

Located at 65 Mitchell Place/35 South Broadway, the building was built to serve as a National Guard armory. Construction of the building began in 1909 and was completed in 1910. The building was designed by state architect Franklin B. Ware. The building was 31,612 square feet and takes up three-quarters of an acre. 49th Separate Company/Company L, 10th Infantry Regiment occupied the armory from 1910 to 1939. From April 1924 to November 1929, the White Plains Armory was the temporary headquarters of Troop K of the New York State Police, after a March 3, 1924 fire destroyed the troop's headquarters at Gedney Farms. The police troop left the Armory in November 1929 after a new headquarters in Hawthorne was completed.

Subsequently, the building's tenants were the 106th Infantry Regiment and then the Headquarters and Headquarters Battalion, Company D, 212th Field Artillery.

It is located on the site of the first courthouse where the Declaration of Independence was read on July 11, 1776.

It was added to the National Register of Historic Places in 1980.

The building was vacated in 1977. In 1982, it was converted to Armory Plaza, a senior housing complex with a senior center on first floor.

== See also ==
- List of armories and arsenals in New York City and surrounding counties
- National Register of Historic Places listings in southern Westchester County, New York
