= 152d Air Operations Group =

- Country: United States
- Allegiance: New York
- Branch: Air National Guard
- Type: Group
- Role: Air Operations Center
- Garrison/HQ: Hancock Field Air National Guard Base, Syracuse, New York

Commanders
- Current commander: Col Nicholas Welly

Insignia
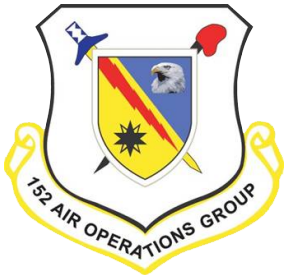
- 152d Air Operations Group emblem

The 152d Air Operations Group (152 AOG) is a unit of the New York Air National Guard, stationed at Hancock Field Air National Guard Base, Syracuse, New York. If called into active federal service, the group is gained by United States Air Forces Europe (USAFE).

== Mission ==
The 152d Air Operations Group's primary day-to-day mission is to augment and support the 603d Air Operations Center, located at Ramstein Air Base, Germany, a part of United States Air Forces Europe (USAFE). The 603d AOC and 152d AOG work together to set up and run an AN/USQ-163 "Falconer" weapons system, for the European and African theater of operations.

== Components ==
The Air Operations Center (AOC) is the senior element of the Theater Air Control System. In the event of hostilities, the Joint Force Commander assigns a Joint Forces Air Component Commander (JFACC) to lead the AOC weapon system. Quite often the Commander, Air Force Forces (COMAFFOR) is assigned the JFACC position for planning and executing theater-wide air and space forces. When there is more than one service working in the AOC it is called the Joint Air and Space Operations Center. In cases of Allied or Coalition (multinational) operations, the AOC is called a Combined Air and Space Operations Center.

There are usually five divisions in the AOC. These separate, but distinct, organizations fuse information that eventually becomes the Air Tasking Order. The divisions are the Strategy Division, the Combat Plans Division, the Combat Operations Division, the Intelligence, Surveillance, Reconnaissance Division and the Air Mobility Division. The Air Communications Squadron supports all aspects of the mission systems and ensures they have the tools needed to generate the Air Tasking Order and execute Air power.

The AN/USQ-163 Falconer is the weapons systems used by the JFACC and within Air Operations Centers by the United States Air Force combat forces to plan and execute military missions utilizing airborne resources. It is used to generate the Air Tasking Order and execute Air power.

== History ==
The 152d Air Operations Group was initially established at Fort Clayton in the Signal Corps during 1939 as the Signal Aircraft Warning Company, Panama. In 1942 the company expanded to battalion size. It provided air defense of the Panama Canal Zone until December 1942, when it was inactivated.

The battalion, now the 558th Signal Aircraft Warning Battalion was activated again in the China Burma India Theater in 1944. The 558th served in combat until the surrender of Japan and remained in theater until January 1946, when it returned to the United States and was inactivated.

In March 1946, the battalion was transferred to the Air Corps, redesignated the 152d Aircraft Warning and Control Group and allotted to the National Guard.

In March 1948, the group was activated and federally recognized in the New York Air National Guard at Westchester County Airport as the air control element of the 52d Fighter Wing. It was assigned three aircraft warning and control squadrons in New York and New Jersey, and an aircraft control squadron stationed with the group headquarters.

In August 1951 the group and its squadrons were called to active duty in the expansion of the United States Air Force during the Korean War and moved to Grenier Air Force Base, New Hampshire as part of Air Defense Command (ADC). The unit did not deploy to Korea, instead it moved to Canada where it operated new radar sites being constructed for Northeast Air Command. In December the group was inactivated and returned to state control.

The unit was moved to the White Plains Armory and eventually to Roslyn Air National Guard Station on Long Island. The mobilization command for the group changed from ADC to Tactical Air Command (TAC). In 1954, the unit was redesignated the 152d Tactical Control Group and changed its mission from air defense to control of tactical aircraft in both offensive and defensive combat. The group was called to active duty during the Berlin Crisis of 1961 and deployed to Germany, where it operated a network of radar sites until being once again returned to state control in 1962.

In 1984 the 152d moved to Hancock Field Air National Guard Base, near Syracuse. It became the 152d Air Control Group in 1992 as the Air Force dropped the terms "Tactical" and "Strategic" from its units names with the inactivation of TAC and Strategic Air Command. Air Combat Command became the new mobilization command for the 152d.

In 2000, the unit's federal mission was changed to augment the Air Operations Center at Ramstein Air Force Base, Germany, for the United States Air Forces Europe (USAFE). The Air Operations Center provides planning, direction, and control of assigned Air Forces. They also direct activities of forces and monitor actions of both enemy and friendly forces.

In March 2011 - The 152nd AOG sent 40 plus members within 48 hours in support of Operation Odyssey Dawn. This was the U.S. code name for the American role in the international military operation in Libya to enforce United Nations Security Council Resolution of 1973. The initial period of, which continued afterwards under NATO command as Operation Unified Protector. The initial operation implemented a no-fly zone that was proposed during the Libyan Civil War to prevent government forces loyal to Muammar Gaddafi from carrying out air attacks on anti-Gaddafi forces. Operations commenced on the same day with a strike by French fighter jets, then US and UK forces conducting strikes from ships and submarines via 110 Tomahawk cruise missiles and air assets bombing Gaddafi forces near Benghazi. The U.S. initially had strategic command of the military intervention, coordinated missions between coalition members and set up Joint Task Force Odyssey Dawn on USS Mount Whitney for the tactical command and control in the area of operations passing complete military command of the operation to NATO and took up a support role on 31 March 2011. At the conclusion of Operation Odyssey Dawn General Mark A. Welsh III, Air Force Chief of Staff stated ..."we needed to get the air operations center up and running. We hadn’t received any approval yet to use funding to bring in people on man days and a big chunk of our AOC there, the guts of it, the strategic guts of it, was to come from Guard: the 152nd [Air Operations Group] out of New York and the 217th [Air Operations Group] out of Michigan. And so finally we just said OK we’re taking every bit of money we have here from man days and the command and just bring them over. We made a phone call and within 24 hours we had like 85 or 90 people [from the Guard] show up. And the AOC was instantly alive. That’s what the Guard does for us."

== Lineage ==
- Activated in December 1939 as the Signal Aircraft Warning Company, Panama

Redesignated 558th Signal Battalion, Aircraft Warning on 15 January 1942
Inactivated on 1 December 1942
Redesignated 558th Signal Aircraft Warning Battalion and activated on 10 August 1944
Inactivated on 11 January 1946

- Converted, redesignated 152d Aircraft Control & Warning Group on 24 May 1946 and allotted to the National Guard

Extended federal recognition and activated on 15 Mar 1948
Called to active duty on 1 August 1951
Inactivated on 20 Dec 1952 and returned to the National Guard
Extended federal recognition and activated on 20 Dec 1952
Redesignated 152d Tactical Control Group on 1 December 1954
Federalized and placed on active duty in Oct 1961
Released from active duty and returned to New York state control c 1 Nov 1962
Redesignated 152d Air Control Group c. 16 June 1992
Redesignated 152d Air Operations Group on 1 August 1996
Federalized and placed on active duty in December 2001
Released from active duty and returned to New York state control
Federalized and placed on active duty in January 2003
Released from active duty and returned to New York state control in February 2003

=== Assignments ===
- Panama Canal Department, December 1939
- Signal Aircraft Warning Service, XXVI Fighter Command c. 9 June 1942 - 1 December 1942
- Tenth Air Force, 10 August 1944
- 33d Fighter Group, October 1944
- North Burma Task Force, c. April 1945
- Tenth Air Force, 1945 - 11 January 1946
- 52d Fighter Wing, 15 March 1948
- New York Air National Guard, 1 November 1950
- First Air Force, 1 August 1951
- Eastern Air Defense Force, August 1951
- 32d Air Division, 6 February 1952
- Northeast Air Command, April 1952
- New York Air National Guard, 10 December 1952
- Ninth Air Force, 1 October 1961
- United States Air Forces Europe, October 1961
- New York Air National Guard, 1 November 1962
- New York Air National Guard, 1 December 2001-Undetermined; 1 January 2003-Undetermined; 1 February 2003 – Present

=== Stations ===
- Fort Clayton, Panama Canal Zone, December 1939
- Albrook Field, Panama Canal Zone, by July 1942 - 1 December 1942
- Dinjan, India, 10 August 1944,
- Myitkyina, Burma, ca. April 1945
- Camp Kilmer, New Jersey, January 1946 - 11 January 1946
- Westchester County Airport, New York, 15 March 1948
- Grenier Air Force Base, New Hampshire, August 1951
- Pepperrell Air Force Base Labrador, April 1952 - 10 December 1952
- Westchester County Airport, New York 10 December 1952 - ca. 1953
- White Plains State Armory, New York, c. 1954
- Roslyn Air National Guard Station, New York, c. 1959
- Mannheim Air Station, Germany October 1961
- Roslyn Air National Guard Station, New York, 1 November 1962
- Hancock Field Air National Guard Base, New York, May 1983
- Ramstein Air Base, December 2001
- Hancock Field Air National Guard Base, New York, unknown
- Unknown - January 2003
- Hancock Field Air National Guard Base, New York, February 2003 – present

== Weapons Systems Operated ==
- AN/USQ-163 Falconer
