= 103d Rescue Squadron =

103rd Rescue Squadron
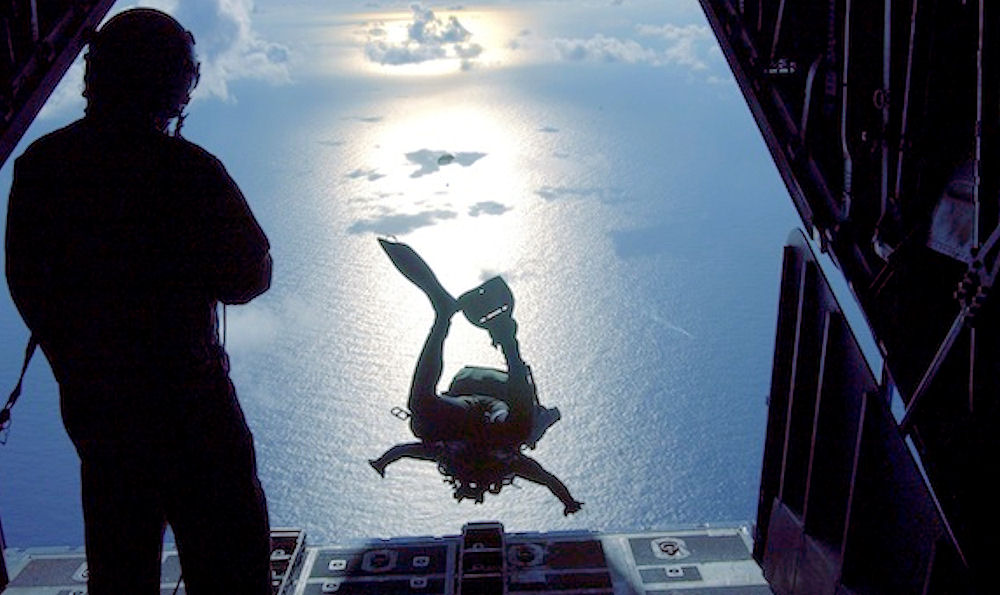
- Night parachute jump of a 103d RS pararescue specialist
- Active: 2004–Present
- Country: United States
- Allegiance: New York
- Branch: Air National Guard
- Type: Pararescue specialists
- Role: Combat Search and Rescue
- Part of: 106th Rescue Wing, New York Air National Guard
- Garrison/HQ: Francis S. Gabreski Air National Guard Base, Westhampton Beach, New York
- Motto: We're all mad... you know!

Insignia
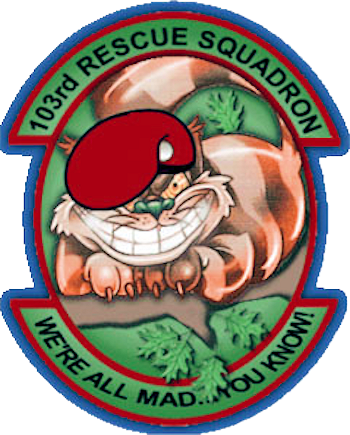
- 103d Rescue Squadron emblem

The 103rd Rescue Squadron (103 RQS) is a unit of the New York Air National Guard 106th Rescue Wing stationed at Francis S. Gabreski Air National Guard Base, Westhampton Beach, New York. The squadron has no assigned aircraft; the squadron is composed of Air Force pararescue specialists (PJs) that use aircraft of the 101st and 102d Rescue Squadrons of the Wing.

== Overview ==
Established in 2004 by the Air Force Special Operations Command as part of a re-organization of Air National Guard rescue wings which created separate squadrons for fixed-wing, helicopter and pararescue elements of the 106th Rescue Wing.

The squadron consists of pararescue and support personnel, using the HH-60G Pave Hawk helicopters of the 101st Rescue Squadron and the HC-130J Combat King II transports of the 102d Rescue Squadron. All three squadrons are assigned to the 106th Operations Group.

=== History ===
For the history of the squadron prior to 2004, see 102nd Rescue Squadron.
