= 102nd Rescue Squadron =

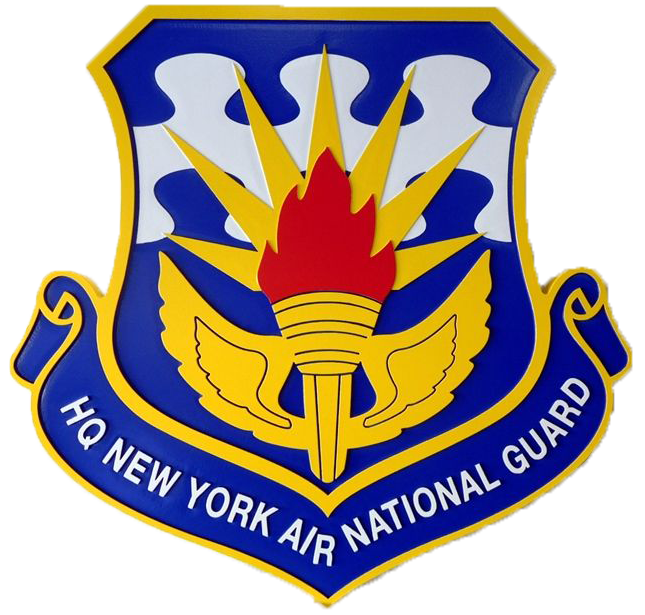
102nd Rescue Squadron

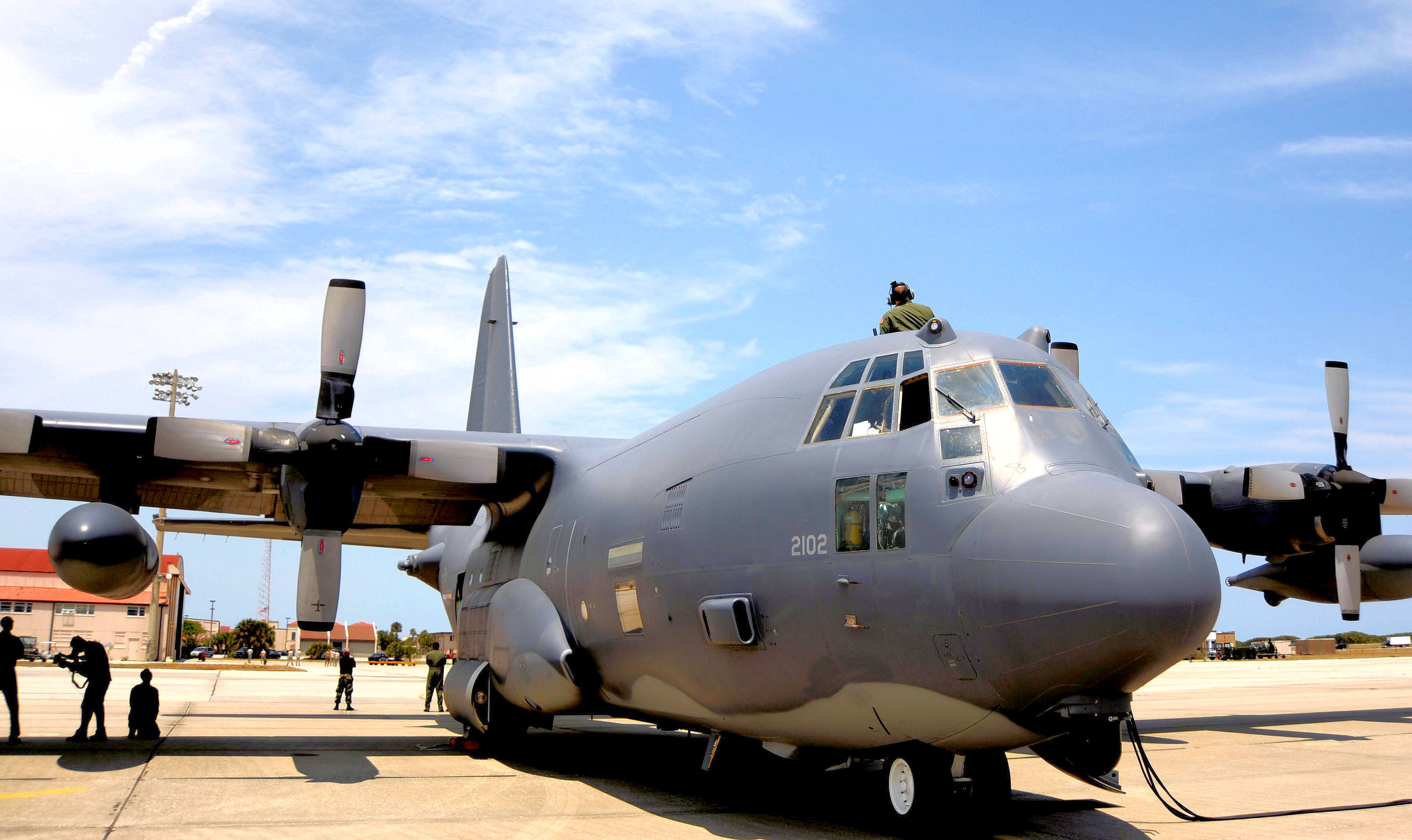
- 102nd Rescue Squadron HC-130 Hercules at Patrick AFB (Note: Aircraft is Lockheed HC-130H Hercules, serial 88-2102. The crew was at Patrick for NASA's space shuttle mission, STS-125 on 11 May 2009. The launch of STS-125 marked the 106th Rescue Wing's 100th rescue mission support for NASA since beginning their participation in 1988.)
- Active: 1915–1917; 1917–1919; 1921-1922; 1922–1944; 1947–1952; 1952–present
- Country: United States
- Allegiance: New York
- Branch: Air National Guard
- Type: Squadron
- Role: Combat search and rescue
- Part of: New York Air National Guard
- Garrison/HQ: Francis S. Gabreski Air National Guard Base, New York
- Nickname: Air National Guard's Oldest Unit
- Motto: That Others May Live
- Engagements: Operation Iraqi Freedom, Operation Enduring Freedom
- Decorations: Air Force Outstanding Unit Award

Commanders
- Commander: Lt Col Kyle F. Hruz
- Notable commanders: George A. Vaughn Jr.

Insignia
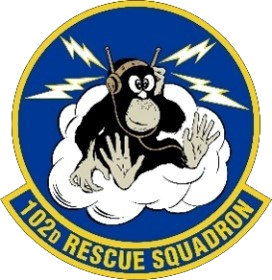
- 102nd Rescue Squadron (Note: This restored the emblem approved for the 102nd Observation Squadron. Hubbard, p. 719.)

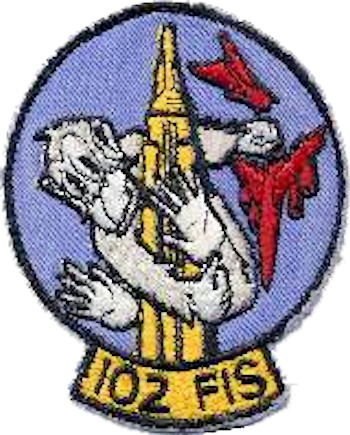
- Patch with 102nd Fighter-Interceptor emblem

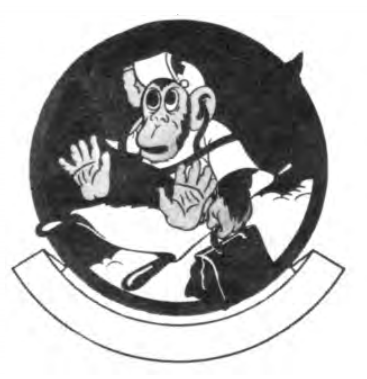
- 102 Aeromedical Transport Sq emblem

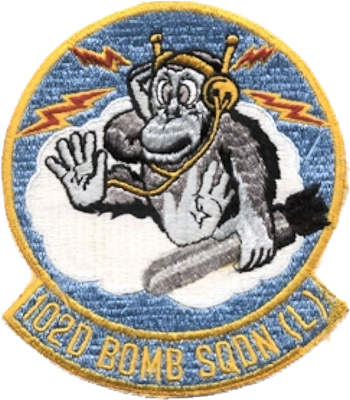
- Patch with 102nd Bombardment Squadron emblem

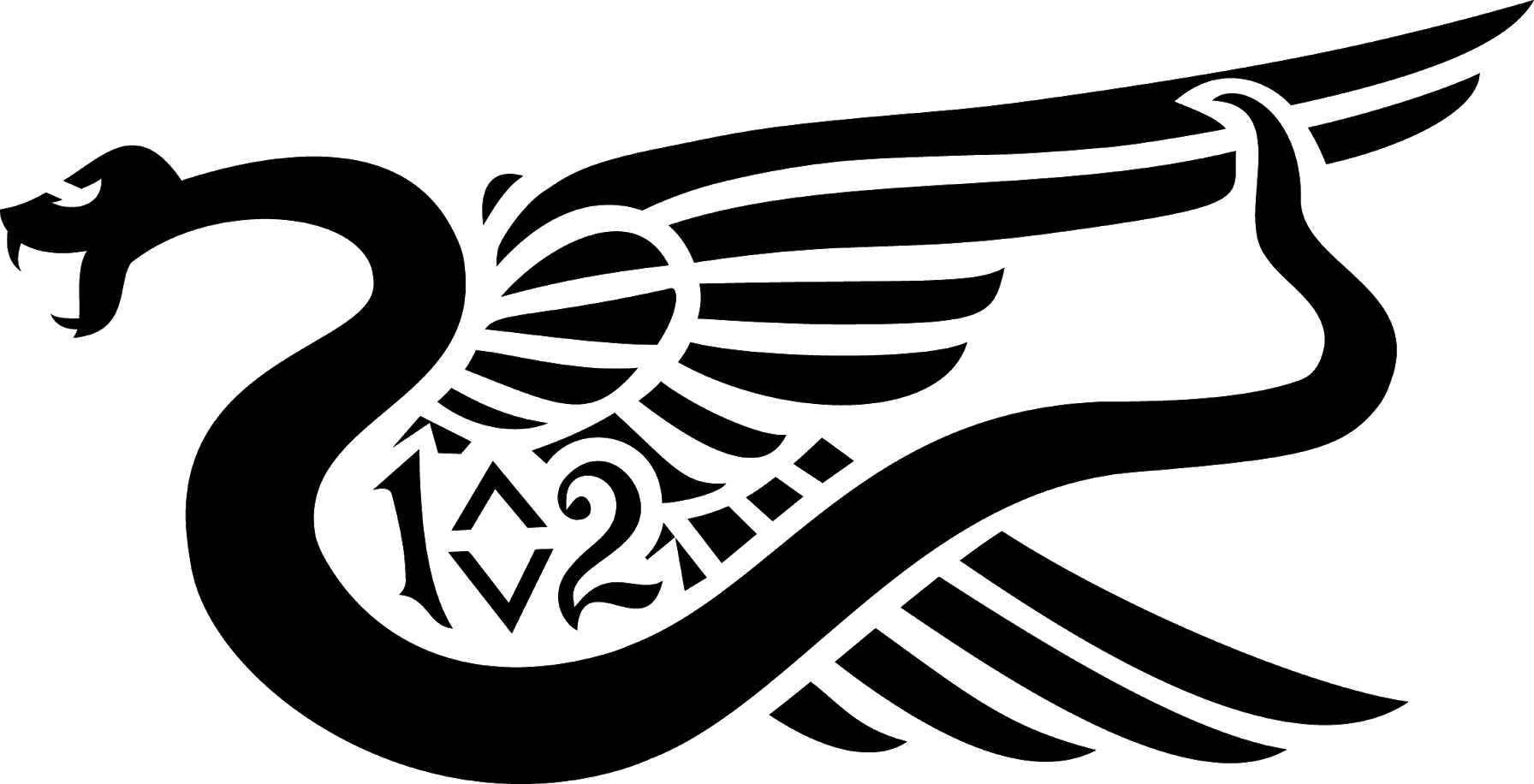
- Heritage patch

Aircraft flown
- Transport: HC-130J Combat King II

The 102nd Rescue Squadron is a unit of the New York Air National Guard 106th Rescue Wing stationed at Francis S. Gabreski Air National Guard Base, New York. The 102nd is equipped with the HC-130J Combat King II transport aircraft.

The squadron is a descendant organization of the World War I 102nd Aero Squadron, established on 23 August 1917. However, its origins began on 30 April 1908, as the 1st Aero Company, a pre-World War I independent unit of the New York National Guard. After the war, the unit was reformed on 7 November 1921 as the 102nd Observation Squadron and is one of the 29 original National Guard Observation Squadrons of the United States Army National Guard formed before World War II.

The 102nd Rescue Squadron is the oldest unit of the Air National Guard, with over a century of service to the state of New York and the United States.

== History ==
=== Origins ===
On 30 April 1908, 1st Lt. Frank P. Lahm reported to New York City along with 1st Lt. Thomas Selfridge and civilian balloonist Leo Stevens to familiarize 25 members of the First Company, Signal Corps, a unit of the 71st New York Infantry, in the use of hydrogen-filled observation balloon. The company was organized to provide the New York National Guard with an "aeronautical corps" for balloon observation, commanded by Major Oscar Erlandean. By 1910 it had acquired a home-made aircraft using private funds and transported it to summer maneuvers, but it was not flown. The aircraft was destroyed in a crash but an airplane owned by Glenn Curtiss was flown during the 1912 summer maneuvers in Connecticut by Private Beckworth "Becky" Havens, a salesman for Curtiss Aeroplane Company. This group sometimes referred to itself as the "1st Aero Company" but was never authorized or officially recognized by either the State of New York or the U.S. Army.

=== 1st Aero Company ===
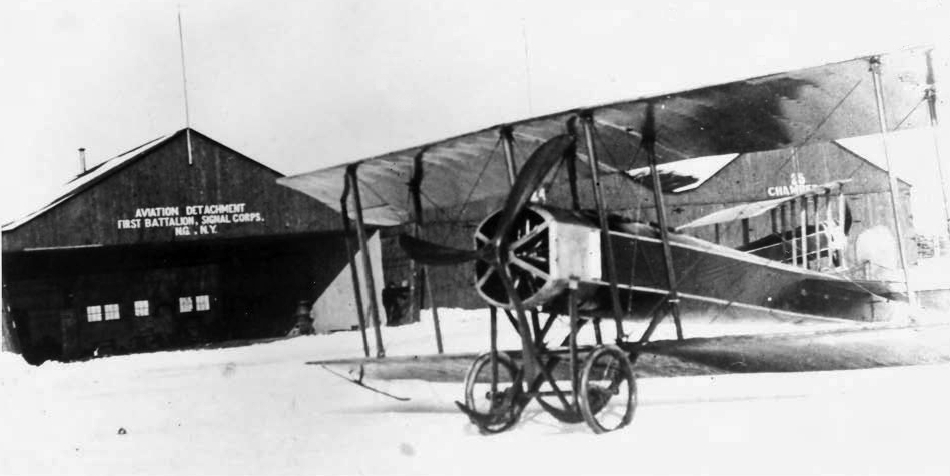
A 1st Aero Company Gallaudet C-2 in 1915

The 102nd traces its official lineage back to the 1st Aero Company, authorized by the governor of New York in October 1915 and organized in November by 1st Lieutenant Raynal Bolling as a detachment of the 1st Battalion Signal Corps, New York National Guard, for aviation training at Mineola on Long Island. The 1st Aero Company was provisionally recognized by the federal government in June 1916 and called to active duty between 13 July 1916, and 15 November 1916, to continue training with the purpose of joining the 1st Aero Squadron, a Regular Army unit deployed to Mexico with the Punitive Expedition. The 1st Aero Company, however, never left Long Island and was disbanded on 23 May 1917, shortly after the United States entered World War I, when the Army decided not to use National Guard aviation units in the war effort. It was later consolidated with the 102nd Aerospace Rescue and Recovery Squadron.

=== 102nd Aero Squadron ===
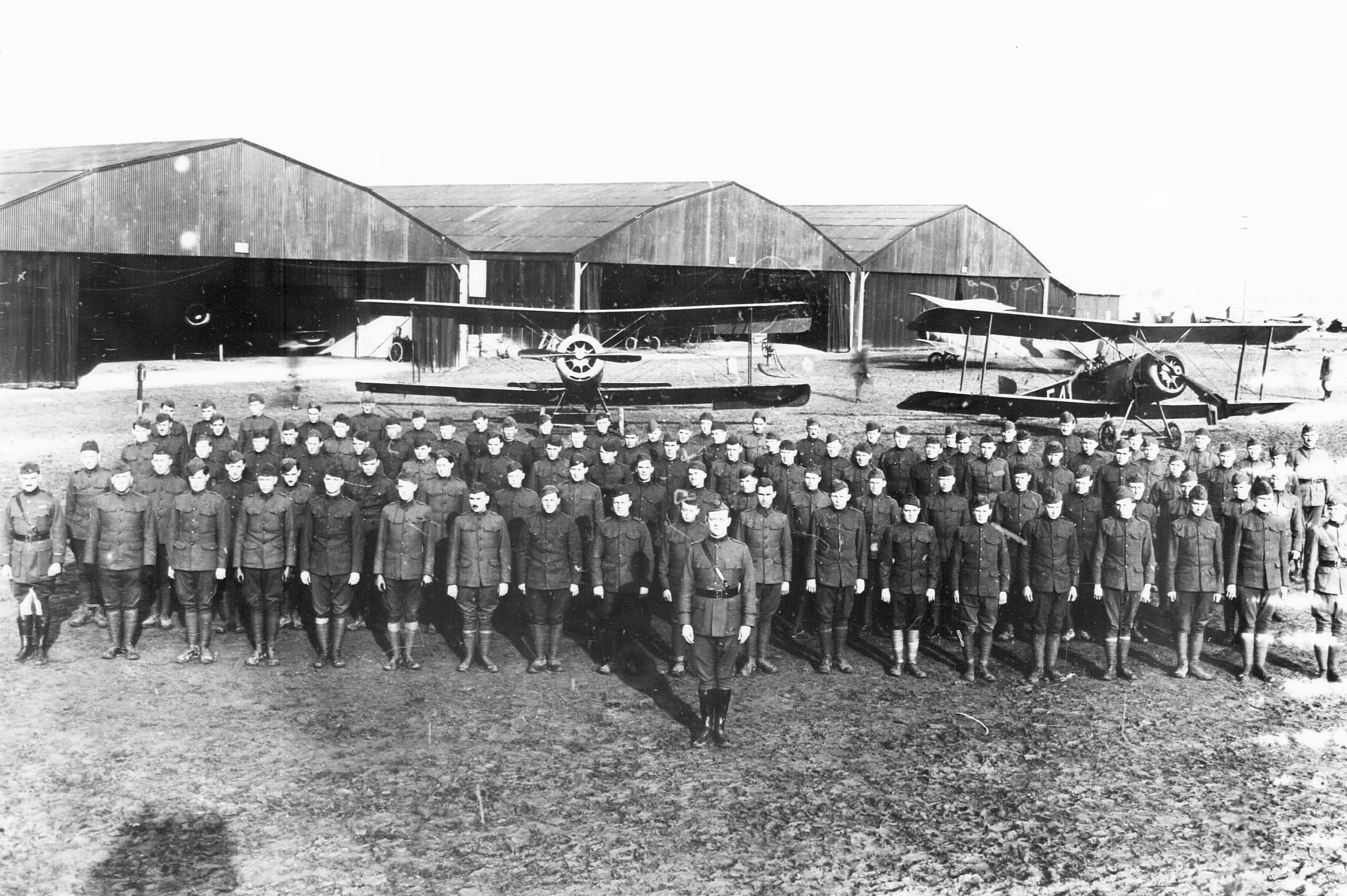
102nd Aero Squadron, Second Air Instructional Center, Tours Aerodrome, France in November 1917. (Note: There appear to be Nieuport 28 trainers in the background.)

The Air Service 102nd Aero Squadron was organized at Kelly Field, Texas, on 23 August 1917. The men engaged in construction activities, drilling, digging ditches, making roads, and putting up tents for recruits arriving at the field. When athletics were started at the camp, the 102nd organized a baseball team which was runners-up for the championship at the field. Once basic indoctrination training was completed, the 102nd was ordered for overseas duty, being ordered to report to the Aviation Concentration Center, Garden City, Long Island. It arrived at Mineola Field on 3 November 1917 where it was prepared and equipped for overseas duty. On 23 November, the squadron, along with the 103d, 104th, and 105th Aero Squadrons were ordered to report to the port of embarkation, Hoboken, New Jersey, for boarding on the former White Star Liner RMS Baltic for transport. After an uneventful Atlantic crossing, it arrived at Liverpool, England, on 8 December 1917.

After a few days at a Rest Camp near Winchester, England, the squadron moved to Le Havre, France, and then traveled by train to the Replacement Concentration Center, AEF, St. Maixent Replacement Barracks, France, arriving on 18 January 1918. At St. Maixent, the 102nd was used as a station squadron, as well as being trained in hiking, fatigue duty, and guard duty. On 1 March, the squadron was ordered to report to the Second Aviation Instructional Center at Tours Aerodrome, in central France. The men were assigned to nearly every department in the field, from the machine shops working on aircraft to the transportation department where the men drove trucks and all manner of vehicles. The squadron remained at Tours until after the Armistice with Germany in November 1918, then returned to the United States in April 1919. It arrived at Mitchel Field, New York, where the squadron members were demobilized and returned to civilian life.

=== New York National Guard ===
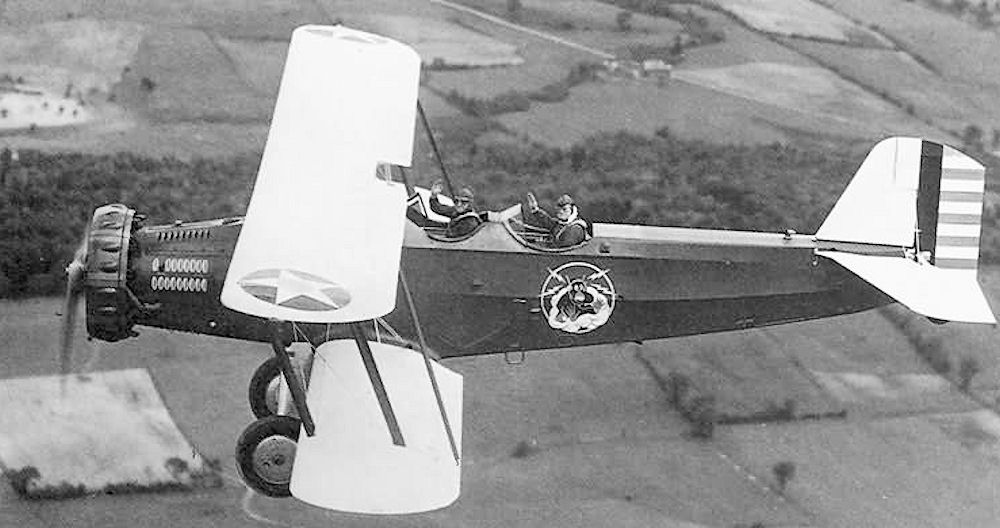
102nd Observation Squadron Douglas O-38 (Note: Taken in 1933. Note the squadron emblem on the side of the plane's fuselage.)

Constituted in 1920 as the 102nd Squadron (Observation), the squadron was assigned to the 27th Division, allotted to the state of New York, as its divisional aviation. The unit was organized in November 1921 by personnel of the Observation Squadron, New York National Guard, which had been organized on 22 March 1921 at Hempstead, New York, with personnel from K Company, 14th Infantry, New York National Guard. It was organized and federally recognized in November 1922 at Miller Field on Staten Island and redesignated as the 102nd Observation Squadron in January 1923.

During the inter-war years, the 102nd Observation Squadron flew a variety of aircraft but continued to serve as the aerial eyes for the commander of the 27th Infantry Division. One of America's leading aces of the First World War, George A. Vaughan (9.5 victories) became one of the squadron's first commanders. He eventually became the 27th Division's Air Officer. In 1929, in a reorganization of the Army, the squadron was relieved from assignment to the 27th Division but remained attached to it for command and control purposes. In October 1933 it was assigned to an observation group for mobilization in case of war.

Its operations were primarily air transportation and aircraft repair and maintenance. However, squadron elements were called up periodically by the state of New York to perform emergency duties that included reconnaissance for the United States Department of the Treasury of vessels conducting illegal liquor trade off the New York-New Jersey coast in the 1920s; support of flood relief efforts in Vermont 6–16 November 1927; aid to civil authorities during a prison break from the maximum security Auburn Prison, 11–12 December 1930; and flood relief efforts in upstate New York 11–13 July 1935.

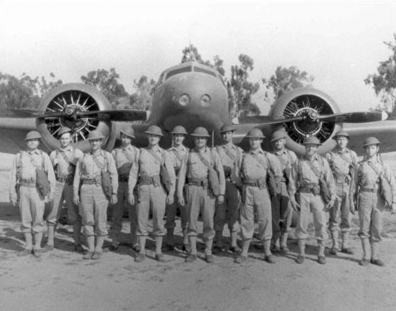
Members of the 102nd Observation Squadron stand in front of the unit's C-40 at Ontario Army Air Field, California (Note: Taken in 1941. This plane was used to move unit supplies and ground support personnel from base to base when the squadron changed station. The squadron's mission aircraft were Douglas O-47 reconnaissance planes.)

The squadron conducted summer training annually at Pine Camp, New York, during the years 1921–40 where it generally supported the training of the 52nd Field Artillery Brigade, and performed other training at Miller Field and at Mitchel Field on Long Island.

In 1936 it was consolidated with the demobilized 102nd Aero Squadron.

=== World War II ===
In October 1940 the 102nd was inducted into active federal service at Miller Field as part of the United States Army Air Corps, relieved from assignment to its parent group, and assigned directly to the VII Corps. The Army relocated it to Fort McClellan, Alabama, shortly after its call up, then assigned it a year later to the 71st Observation Group. Initially, it was assigned to antisubmarine patrols over the Gulf of Mexico. After the Attack on Pearl Harbor, the squadron was moved to Southern California, flying antisubmarine patrols over the Los Angeles coast until November 1942.

It returned to Third Air Force control in late 1943, becoming a reconnaissance training unit for Army ground forces at Fort Hood, Texas, and Fort Polk, Louisiana. Moved to the Desert Training Center in southern California in early 1944, continuing supplying reconnaissance training for Army units engaged in desert warfare training until April 1944 when the DTC was closed and the squadron was disbanded.

=== New York Air National Guard ===
As part of the formation of the Air National Guard after World War II, the unit was reconstituted on 21 June 1945. The wartime 102nd Tactical Reconnaissance Squadron was redesignated the 102nd Bombardment Squadron, Light, and was allotted to the National Guard on 24 May 1946. It was organized at Floyd Bennett Field, New York, and was extended federal recognition on 21 March 1947, and activated by the National Guard Bureau. The squadron was equipped with Douglas B-26 Invader light bombers and was assigned to the 106th Bombardment Group and operationally gained by Tactical Air Command.

The mission of the squadron was proficiency in tactical bombing. Parts were no problem and many of the maintenance personnel were World War II veterans so readiness was quite high and the planes were often much better maintained than their USAF counterparts. In some ways, the postwar Air National Guard was almost like a flying country club and a pilot could often show up at the field, check out an aircraft and go flying. However, the unit also had regular military exercises that kept up proficiency and in gunnery and bombing contests they would often score at least as well or better than active-duty USAF units, given the fact that most ANG pilots were World War II combat veterans.

==== Korean War activation ====
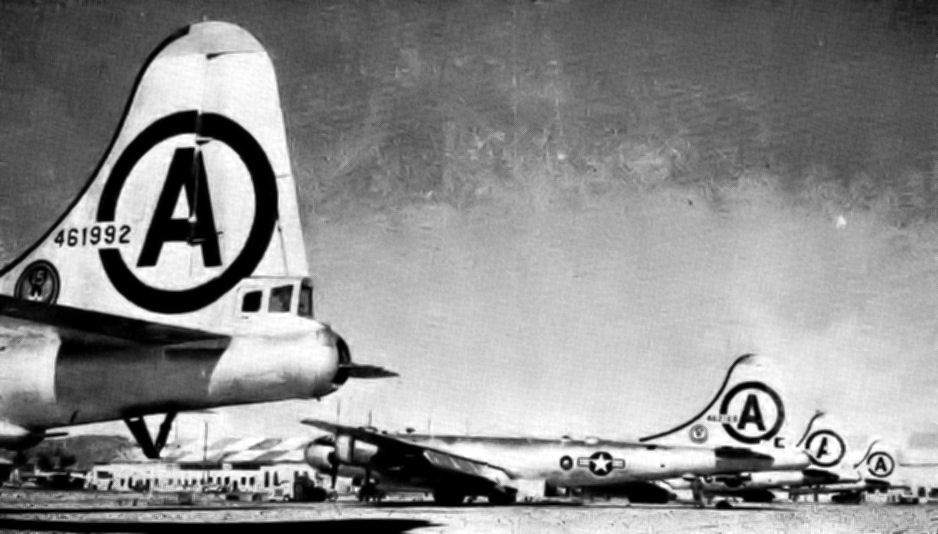
106th Bombardment Wing B-29 Superfortresses at March AFB, 1951

With the surprise invasion of South Korea on 25 June 1950, and the regular military's lack of readiness, most of the Air National Guard was placed on active duty on 1 February 1951. The 102nd's B-26 light attack bombers were sent to Fifth Air Force in Japan for use in the Korean War, and the 106th Group was federalized and assigned to Strategic Air Command. On 28 March 1951, the Group moved less equipment to March Air Force Base, California. The 102nd was re-equipped with Boeing B-29 Superfortresses and given the mission to train reservist crewmen to back-fill rotating B-29 combat crews serving in Korea. While the air guardsmen were undergoing training they were paid on the lesser reserve pay scale. When its active duty tour came to an end, the squadron was inactivated in December 1952 and its personnel and equipment at March were transferred to the 441st Bombardment Squadron and the squadron returned to New York state control.

==== Cold War ====
With its return to New York state control in 1953, the 102nd was again equipped with B-26 Invaders, the aircraft being returned from combat duty in Korea. The 102nd trained in proficiency with the attack bomber until the removal of the B-26 from bombing duties in 1956 as neared the end of their service lives.

The 106th was transferred from Tactical Air Command to Air Defense Command (ADC) and assumed an air defense mission over Long Island and New York City, entering the Jet Age with the limited all-weather Lockheed F-94B Starfire interceptor. With the Starfire, the 102nd began standing end of runway air defense alert, ready to launch interceptors if ADC Ground Intercept Radar picked up an unidentified target. The squadron stood on air defense alert from one hour before sunrise until one hour after sunset every day, 365 days a year. In 1957, ADC upgraded the 102nd Fighter-Interceptor Squadron to the all-weather North American F-86D Sabre. With the receipt of the F-86D, the alert mission was extended to 24 hours a day/7 days a week/365 days a year.

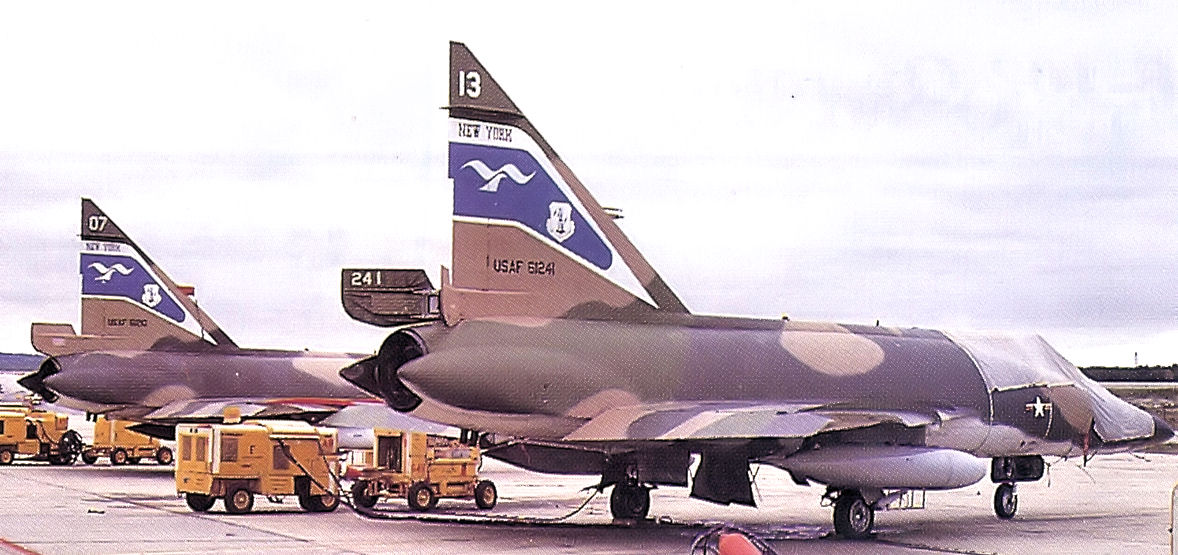
102nd Fighter-Interceptor Squadron F-102s in September 1974 (Note: Aircraft in foreground is Convair F-102A-70-CO Delta Dagger, serial 56-1241. This plane was retired to MASDC on 16 October 1974. It was later converted to a target drone. The squadron was unusual in that its interceptors carried tactical camouflage.)

In 1956, Lt. Col. Norma Parsons made military and National Guard history when she became the first woman member of the National Guard, the first woman member of the Air National Guard, and the first woman to be commissioned in the Air National Guard.

In 1958, the squadron was reassigned to Military Air Transport Service (MATS), trading in its Sabres for 4-engined Boeing C-97 Stratofreighter transports, being gained by the MATS' Eastern Transport Air Force. The 102nd worked closely with the 1st Aeromedical Evacuation Transport Group at Kelly Air Force Base, San Antonio, Texas, a regular Air Force unit.

Initially equipped with specialized MC-119J Flying Boxcars configured for transport of wounded and injured, the 102nd Aeromedical Transport Squadron airlifted critically injured and sick personnel until 1964. With air transportation recognized as a critical wartime need, the 102nd was redesignated the 102nd Air Transport Squadron, Heavy in January 1964, and equipped with C-97 Stratofreighter heavy transports. With the C-97s, the 102nd augmented MATS airlift capability worldwide in support of the Air Force's needs in Europe. It also flew scheduled MATS transport missions to Europe, Africa, the Caribbeans, and South America.

With the acquisition of KC-97 Stratotankers from Strategic Air Command, the 104th was transferred back to Tactical Air Command in September 1969 and the 102nd became an air refueling squadron. Its mission was to provide air refueling to tactical fighters. With the KC-97 being a variant of the C-97 Stratofreighter the conversion of the unit from transports to refueling aircraft was easily accomplished, the squadron receiving the KC-97Ls with the addition of jet engine pods mounted to the outboard wings. It rotated personnel and aircraft to West Germany as part of Operation Creek Party, a continuous rotational mission flying from Rhein Main Air Base, West Germany, providing air refueling to United States Air Forces in Europe (USAFE) tactical aircraft. The success of this operation, which would continue until 1972, demonstrated the ability of the Air National Guard to perform significant day-to-day missions without being mobilized.

In 1969, the Air Force closed Suffolk County Air Force Base and the NYANG relocated there. The 102nd Air Refueling Squadron returned to ADC in 1972 and again became an air defense unit. The 102nd was re-equipped with the Convair F-102A Delta Dagger, which was being replaced in the active duty interceptor force by the Convair F-106 Delta Dart. The Mach 2 "Deuce", still a very potent interceptor, served with the 102nd until June 1975, when Aerospace Defense Command was reducing the USAF interceptor force as the threat of Soviet bombers attacking the United States was deemed remote.

==== Rescue mission ====
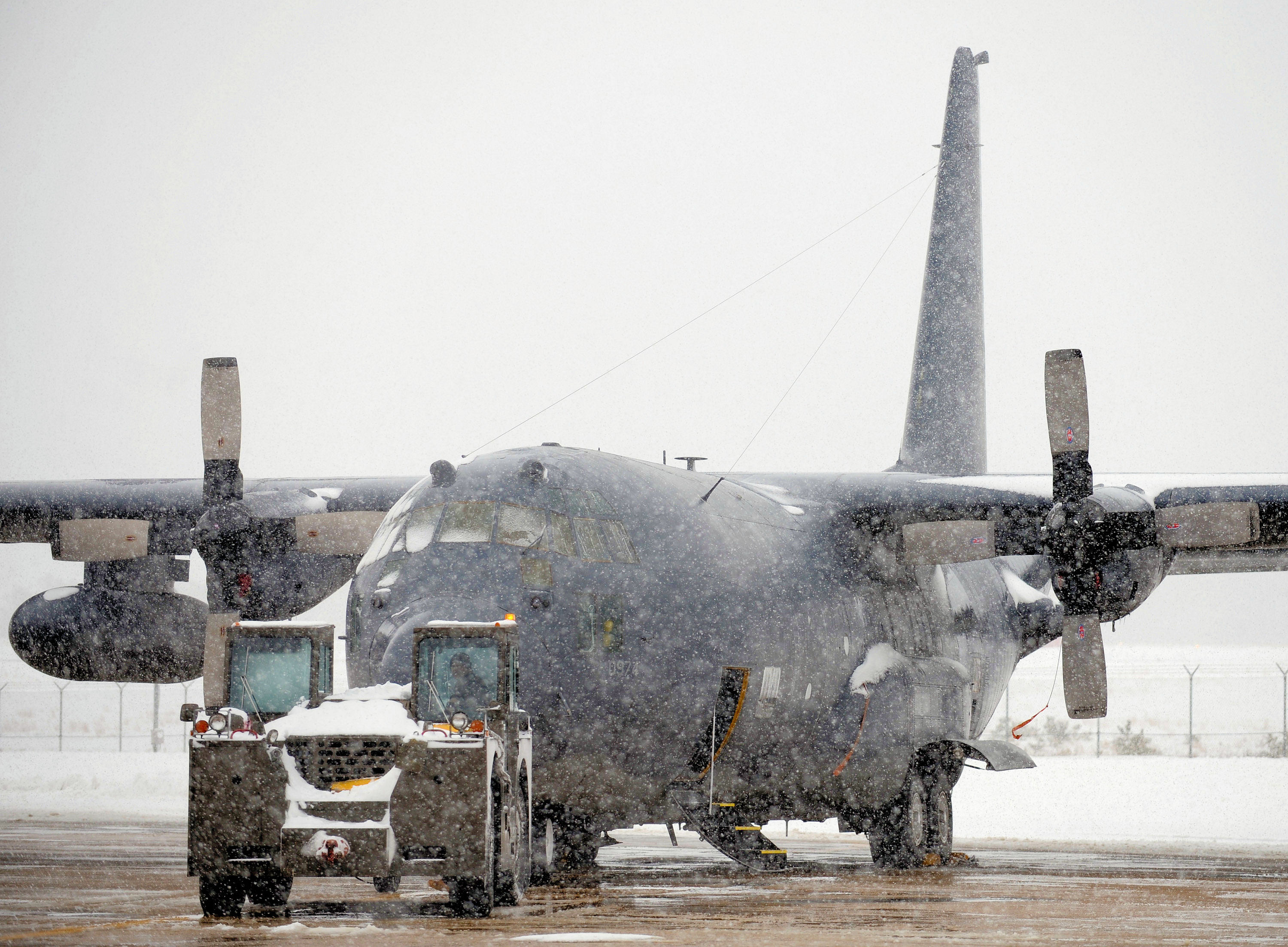
102nd Rescue Squadron HC-130 in the 2010 New York City blizzard

The 102nd converted to an Aerospace Rescue and Recovery Squadron in 1975, flying Sikorsky HH-3E rescue helicopters and Lockheed HC-130 Hercules tankers for in-flight refueling. The squadron's base on Long Island enables it to act as the only Air Force rescue organization in the northeastern United States. It upgraded its inventory to provide a capability for long-range over-water missions using the air refueling capabilities of the HC-130s and Sikorsky HH-60G Pave Hawk rescue helicopters.

After the midair explosion of the Space Shuttle Challenger in 1986, the 106th Rescue Wing and its squadrons were designated to provide support for every shuttle launch thereafter.

In October 1991, an HH-60 and a tanker flew to an endangered sailboat about 250 miles south of its base. The Pave Hawk and HC-130 dropped survival gear to the vessel, which was riding out the storm, and began their return to base. Both aircraft encountered severe weather conditions and the helicopter was unable to take on fuel. The HH-60 was forced to ditch in the Atlantic Ocean about 60 miles south of the base in what would later become known as "the Perfect Storm", and all but one member of the crew were saved by the crew of the United States Coast Guard cutter USCGC Tamaroa. TSgt Alden Smith, a pararescueman, lost his life fulfilling the squadron's motto That Others May Live. The mission was recounted in both a best selling book and major motion picture.

From 1991 to 2002, the 102nd deployed personnel and aircraft to support Operation Northern Watch in Turkey and Operation Southern Watch in Kuwait and Saudi Arabia. While supporting Operation Iraqi Freedom, the squadron made its first two combat rescues on 2 November 2003 by using a hydraulic rescue tool to extricate two injured soldiers trapped in the burning wreckage of an Army CH-47 Chinook helicopter shot down near Fallujah.

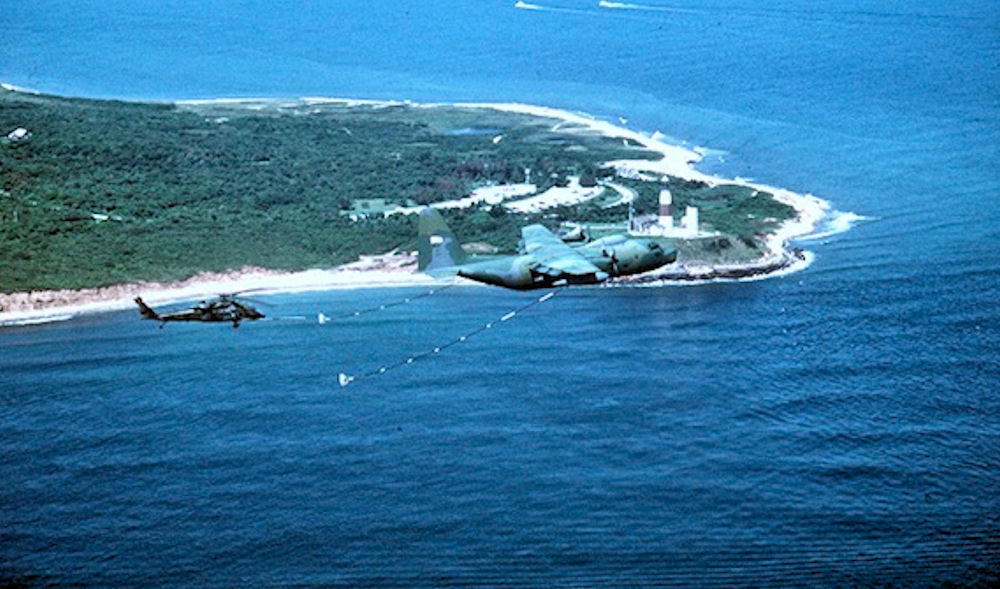
102nd HC-130 refueling a 101st Rescue Squadron HH-60 Pave Hawk helicopter over Montauk Point, Long Island, New York.

The 102nd received international recognition when two aircrews and PJs of the squadron completed the "longest over-water rescue with a helicopter in aviation history" in December 1994, a mission in which a pair of HH-60s flew to Halifax, Nova Scotia, and then 750 miles out over the Atlantic Ocean to search for survivors of the Ukrainian cargo ship Salvador Allende. A search of the area located the last survivor, and the pararescue TSgt James Dougherty, jumped into the ocean. During the 15-hour mission, the two helicopter crews were refueled in flight 10 times by HC-130s.

The 106th Rescue Wing has assisted the state in battling the 1995 "Sunrise Wildfires" in the Hamptons, they were first on the scene after the crash of TWA Flight 800, and the recovery of the wreckage from the plane flown by John F. Kennedy Jr., which crashed into the Atlantic Ocean in 1999. The squadron located the transponder of the wreckage of the plane underwater. After June 1996, some components of the squadron have been designated the 102nd Expeditionary Rescue Squadron when deployed overseas as part of Air and Space Expeditionary forces.

In 1998, the wing carried out the longest over-water rescue mission in an HH-60, saved one soul, made famous by the book: Pararescue, The Untold Story of a rescue and the heroes that pulled it off, written by Michael Hirsh. On 11 September 2001, the first ANG personnel on the scene at the World Trade Center were those of the 106th Rescue Wing.

In 2004, Air Force Special Operations Command reorganized Air National Guard rescue wings, establishing separate squadrons for fixed-wing, helicopter, and pararescue. The squadron transferred its HH-60G Pave Hawk helicopters to the 101st Rescue Squadron and its pararescue personnel to the 103d Rescue Squadron.

== Lineage ==
1st Aero Company, New York National Guard

- Organized as the Aviation Detachment, 1st Battalion Signal Corps New York National Guard on 15 November 1915

Redesignated 1st Aero Company, New York National Guard in 1916
Disbanded on 23 May 1917
Reconstituted and consolidated with the 102nd Air Rescue Squadron on 14 March 1991

102nd Aero Squadron

- Organized as the 102nd Aero Squadron on 23 August 1917

Redesignated 102nd Aero Squadron (Service) on 2 March 1918
Demobilized on 1 May 1919
Reconstituted on 20 October 1936 and consolidated with the 102nd Observation Squadron

102nd Military Airlift Squadron

- Constituted in the National Guard on 30 December 1920 as the 102nd Squadron (Observation) and allotted to the state of New York

Organized on 17 November 1921
Inactivated on 3 September 1922

- Reorganized and federally recognized on 4 November 1922

Redesignated 102nd Observation Squadron on 25 January 1923

- Consolidated on 20 October 1936 with the 102nd Aero Squadron

Ordered to active service on 15 October 1940
Redesignated 102nd Observation Squadron (Light) on 13 January 1942
Redesignated 102nd Observation Squadron on 4 July 1942
Redesignated 102nd Reconnaissance Squadron (Bombardment) on 2 April 1943
Redesignated 102nd Tactical Reconnaissance Squadron on 11 August 1943
Disbanded on 15 April 1944
Reconstituted on 21 June 1945
Redesignated 102nd Bombardment Squadron, Light and allotted to the National Guard on 24 May 1946
Extended federal recognition on 20 February 1947
Ordered to active service on 1 March 1951
Redesignated 102nd Bombardment Squadron, Medium on 1 May 1951
Inactivated, released from active service and returned to New York state control on 1 December 1952
Redesignated 102nd Fighter-Interceptor Squadron on 1 July 1956
Redesignated 102nd Aeromedical Transport Squadron on 15 September 1958
Redesignated 102nd Air Transport Squadron, Heavy on 11 January 1964
Redesignated 102nd Military Airlift Squadron on 1 January 1966
Inactivated on 16 September 1969
Consolidated with the 102nd Air Refueling Squadron and the 102nd Aerospace Rescue and Recovery Squadron on 18 August 1987

102nd Air Refueling Squadron

- Constituted as the 102nd Air Refueling Squadron

Activated on 17 September 1969
Inactivated on 1 December 1972
Consolidated with the 102nd Military Airlift Squadron and the 102nd Aerospace Rescue and Recovery Squadron on 18 August 1987

102nd Rescue Squadron

- Constituted as the 102nd Fighter-Interceptor Squadron on 30 May 1972

Activated on 2 December 1972
Redesignated 102nd Aerospace Rescue & Recovery Squadron on 14 June 1975
Consolidated with the 102nd Military Airlift Squadron and the 102nd Air Refueling Squadron on 18 August 1987
Redesignated 102nd Air Rescue Squadron on 1 October 1989
Consolidated with the 1st Aero Company, New York National Guard on 14 March 1991
Redesignated 102nd Rescue Squadron on 16 March 1992

=== Assignments ===
- Post Headquarters, Kelly Field, 23 August – 3 November 1917
- Aviation Concentration Center, 3–23 November 1917
- Headquarters, Chief of Air Service, American Expeditionary Force, 9 December 1917 – 9 January 1918 (attached to Royal Flying Corps)
- Replacement Concentration Center, AEF, 16 January – 2 March 1918
- Second Aviation Instruction Center, 2 March 1918 – March 1919
- Aviation Concentration Center, March – 1 May 1919
- 27th Division Air Service, 17 November 1921 – 3 September 1922
- 27th Division Air Service (later 27th Division Aviation), 4 November 1922
- 27th Division, 15 February 1929 (attached)
- 42nd Observation Group, 1 October 1933
- Second Corps Area, 16 October 1940
- VII Army Corps, c. November 1940
- II Air Support Command, 1 September 1941
- 71st Observation Group, 1 October 1941 (attached to 69th Observation Group after December 1941)
- 69th Observation Group (later 69th Reconnaissance Group, 69th Tactical Reconnaissance Group), 29 March 1942
- 76th Tactical Reconnaissance Group, 5–15 April 1944
- New York National Guard, 20 February 1947
- 106th Bombardment Group (later 106th Composite Group, 106th Bombardment Group), 21 March 1947 (attached to 106th Bombardment Wing after 14 February 1951)
- 106th Bombardment Wing 16 June 1952 – 1 December 1952
- 106th Bombardment Group (later 106th Fighter-Interceptor Group, 106th Aeromedical Transport Group, 106th Air Transport Group, 106th Air Refueling Group, 106th Fighter-Interceptor Group, 106th Air Rescue Group, 106th Rescue Group), 1 December 1952
- 106th Operations Group, 1 October 1995 – present

=== Stations ===
- Kelly Field, Texas, 23 August 1917
- Aviation Concentration Center, Garden City, New York, 3–23 Nov 1917
- Winchester, England, 9 December 1917 – 9 January 1918
- St. Maixent Replacement Barracks, France, 16 January 1918
- Tours Aerodrome, France, 2 March 1918 – Mar 1919
- Camp Mills, Garden City, New York, c. 19 April – 1 May 1919
- Hempstead Field, Long Island, New York, 17 November 1921
- Miller Field, Staten Island, New York, 4 November 1922
- Fort McClellan Army Air Field, Alabama, 26 October 1940
- San Bernardino Army Air Field, California, 22 December 1941
- Ontario Army Air Field, California, 31 May 1942
- Laurel Army Air Field, Mississippi, 11 November 1942
- Esler Field, Louisiana, 30 March 1943
- Abilene Army Air Field, Texas, 11 September 1943
- Esler Field, Louisiana, 13 November 1943
- Thermal Army Air Field, California, 11–15 April 1944
- Floyd Bennett Field, New York, 21 March 1947
- March Air Force Base, California, 28 March 1951 – 1 December 1952
- Floyd Bennett Field, New York, 1 December 1952
- Suffolk County Air National Guard Base (later Francis S. Gabreski Air National Guard Base), New York, 1 June 1970 – present

=== Aircraft ===
- Included Curtiss JN-4, TW-3 Trusty, FT-1, Northrop BT-1, O-11 Falcon, and O-17 Courier during period 1922–1933
- Douglas O-38, c. 1932-c. 1937
- Douglas O-46, 1936-c. 1943
- North American O-47, 1942–1943
- O-52 Owl, 1942–1943,
- O-57 Grasshopper, 1941
- L-4 Grasshopper, 1942–1943
- Bell P-39 Airacobra, 1943–1944
- Douglas A-20 Havoc, 1943–1944
- North American B-25 Mitchell, 1943–1944
- L-5 Sentinel, 1943–1944
- Curtiss P-40 Warhawk, 1943–1944
- Douglas B-26 Invader, 1947–1951; 1952–1955
- Boeing B-29 Superfortress, 1951–1952
- Lockheed F-94B Starfire, 1956–1959
- North American F-86D Sabre, 1957–1959
- Fairchild C-119 Flying Boxcar, 1959–1960
- C-97A/G Stratofreighter, 1960–1962
- Boeing KC-97L Stratotanker, 1962–1972
- Convair F-102A Delta Dagger, 1972–1975
- Sikorsky HH-3E Sea King, 1975–1990
- Lockheed HC-130P Hercules, 1975–2019
- HC-130N Combat King, 1988–2019
- HH-60G Pavehawk, 1990–2025
- HC-130J Combat King II, 2019 – present
- HH-60W Jolly Green II, 2025-present

== See also ==
- List of American aero squadrons
- List of observation squadrons of the United States Army National Guard
- The Perfect Storm (book)
