= New York Air National Guard =

- Emblem of the New York Air National Guard
- Active: 17 November 1921 - present
- Country: United States
- Allegiance: State of New York
- Branch: Air National Guard
- Type: State militia, military reserve force
- Role: "To meet state and federal mission responsibilities."
- Part of: New York State Division of Military and Naval Affairs; United States National Guard Bureau; New York National Guard
- Garrison/HQ: New York Air National Guard, Stratton Air National Guard Base, 1 Air National Guard Road, Scotia, NY 12302

Commanders
- Civilian leadership: President Donald Trump (Commander-in-Chief); Troy Meink (Secretary of the Air Force); Governor Kathy Hochul (Governor of the State of New York)
- Military leadership: Maj. Gen. Gary R. Charlton II (NY ANG Commander); CCM Michael T. Hewson (NY ANG Command Chief)

Aircraft flown
- Multirole helicopter: HH-60G Pavehawk; HH-60W Jolly Green II
- Reconnaissance: MQ-9 Reaper
- Transport: C-17 Globemaster III; HC-130J Combat King II; LC-130H Hercules

The New York Air National Guard (NY ANG) is the aerial militia of the U.S. state of New York. It is an element of the New York National Guard as part of the larger Air National Guard, a reservist force under the command of the United States Air Force.

As state militia units, the units in the New York Air National Guard are not in the normal United States Air Force chain of command. They are under the jurisdiction of the governor of New York through the office of the New York adjutant general unless they are activated for federal service by order of the president of the United States. The New York Air National Guard is headquartered at Stratton Air National Guard Base, Glenville, New York, and its current commander is Major General Timothy J. LaBarge.

== Overview ==
Under the "Total Force" concept, New York Air National Guard units are considered to be Air Reserve Components (ARC) of the United States Air Force (USAF). New York ANG units are trained and equipped by the Air Force and are operationally gained by a major command of the USAF if federalized. In addition, the New York Air National Guard forces are assigned to Air Expeditionary Forces and are subject to deployment tasking orders along with their active duty and Air Force Reserve counterparts in their assigned cycle deployment window.

Along with their federal reserve obligations, as state militia units the elements of the New York ANG are subject to being activated by order of the governor to provide protection of life and property, and preserve peace, order and public safety. State missions include disaster relief in times of earthquakes, hurricanes, floods and forest fires, search and rescue, protection of vital public services, and support to civil defense.

== Current structure ==
Current New York Air National Guard Structure;

=== 105th Airlift Wing – Stewart Air National Guard Base, Newburgh ===
Meets inter-theater airlift and expeditionary combat support commitments. Operates the C-17A Globemaster III.

- 105th Operations Group

137th Airlift Squadron
105th Operational Support Squadron

- 105th Maintenance Group

105th Aircraft Maintenance Squadron
105th Maintenance Squadron
105th Maintenance Operations Flight

- 105th Mission Support Group

105th Civil Engineering Squadron
105th Force Support Squadron
105th Logistics Readiness Squadron
105th Base Defense Squadron
105th Communications Flight

- 105th Medical Group
- 105th Comptroller Flight
- 213th Engineering Installation Squadron

=== 106th Rescue Wing – Francis S. Gabreski Air National Guard Base, Westhampton Beach ===
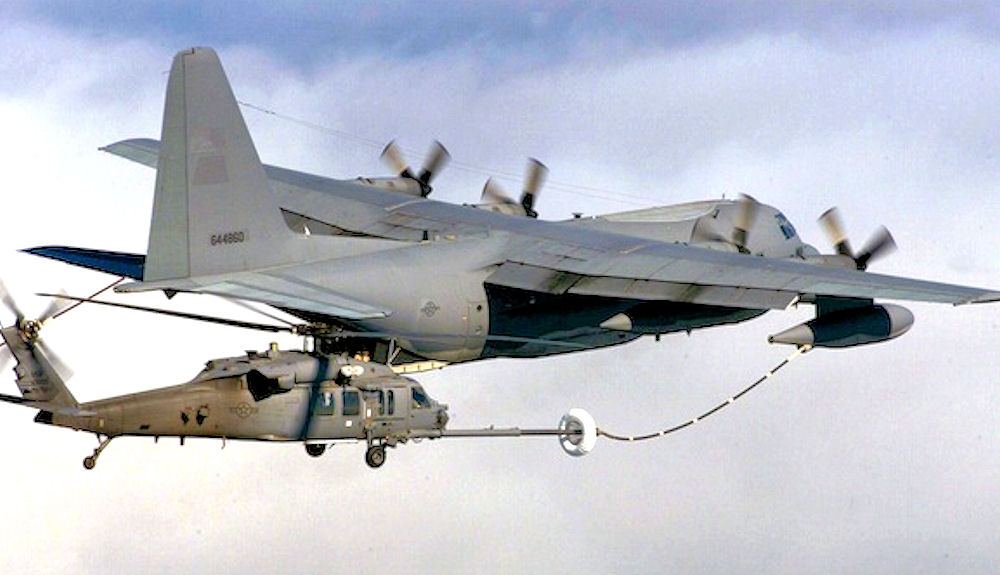
An HC-130 of the 106th Rescue Wing refueling an HH-60 Pave Hawk over Long Island, New York.

Provides worldwide combat search and rescue coverage for U.S. and allied forces. Combat search and rescue missions include flying low-level, preferably at night aided with night vision goggles, to an objective area where aerial refueling of a rescue helicopter is performed, or pararescue teams are deployed. Operates the HH-60G Pavehawk HH-60W Jolly Green II helicopters and the HC-130J Combat King II transport aircraft.

- 106th Operations Group

101st Rescue Squadron [Using HH-60G Pave Hawk and HH-60W Jolly Green II]
102nd Rescue Squadron [Using HC-130J Combat King II]
103rd Rescue Squadron [Pararescue elements]
106th Operation Support Squadron

- 106th Mission Support Group

106th Security Forces Squadron
106th Civil Engineering Squadron
106th Aerial Port Flight
106th Logistics Readiness Squadron
106th Services Flight
106th Communications Flight

- 106th Force Support Group

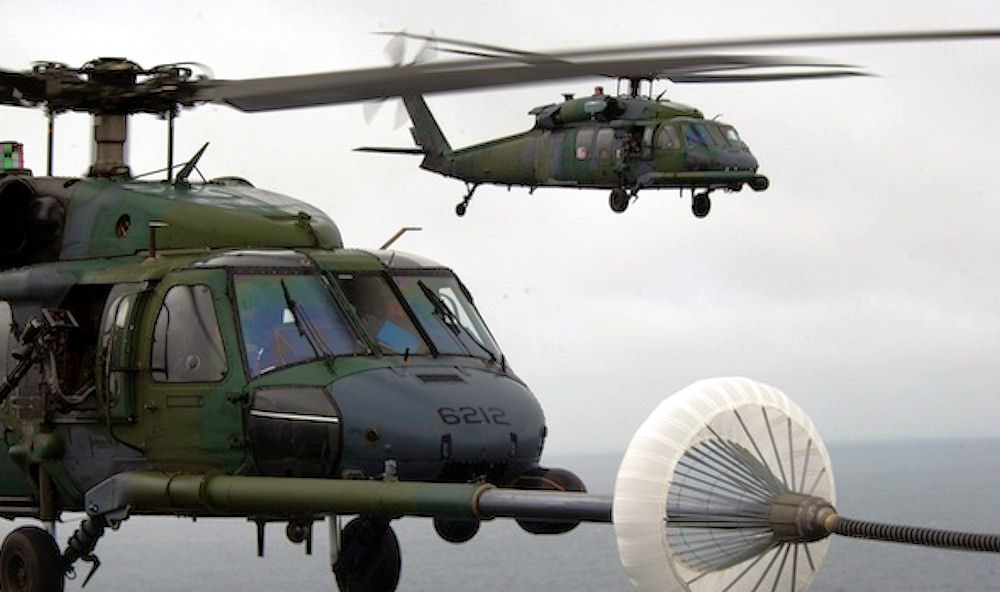
HH-60G Pavehawks of the 101st Rescue Squadron in 2010.

106th Personnel Flight
106th Honour Guard

- 106th Maintenance Group

106th Aircraft Maintenance Squadron
106th Maintenance Squadron
106th Maintenance Operations Flight

- 106th Medical Group

=== 107th Attack Wing – Niagara Falls Air Reserve Station, Niagara Falls ===
The 107th was officially re-designated the 107th Attack Wing on 15 March 2017. The name change reflects the wing's mission of providing aircrew members and supporting staff trained to operate the MQ-9 Reaper remotely piloted aircraft. The wing began transformation and training of crews and personnel in 2014. The 107th is the second New York Air National Guard wing to assume the remotely piloted aircraft mission. Previously operated the C-130H Hercules as an airlift wing.

- 107th Operations Group

Operations Support Squadron
136th Attack Squadron [Using MQ-9 Reaper]

- 107th Mission Support Group

Civil Engineer Squadron
Communications Flight
Logistics Readiness Squadron
Mission Support Flight
Security Forces Squadron
Services Flight

- 107th Medical Group

=== 109th Airlift Wing – Stratton Air National Guard Base, Schenectady ===
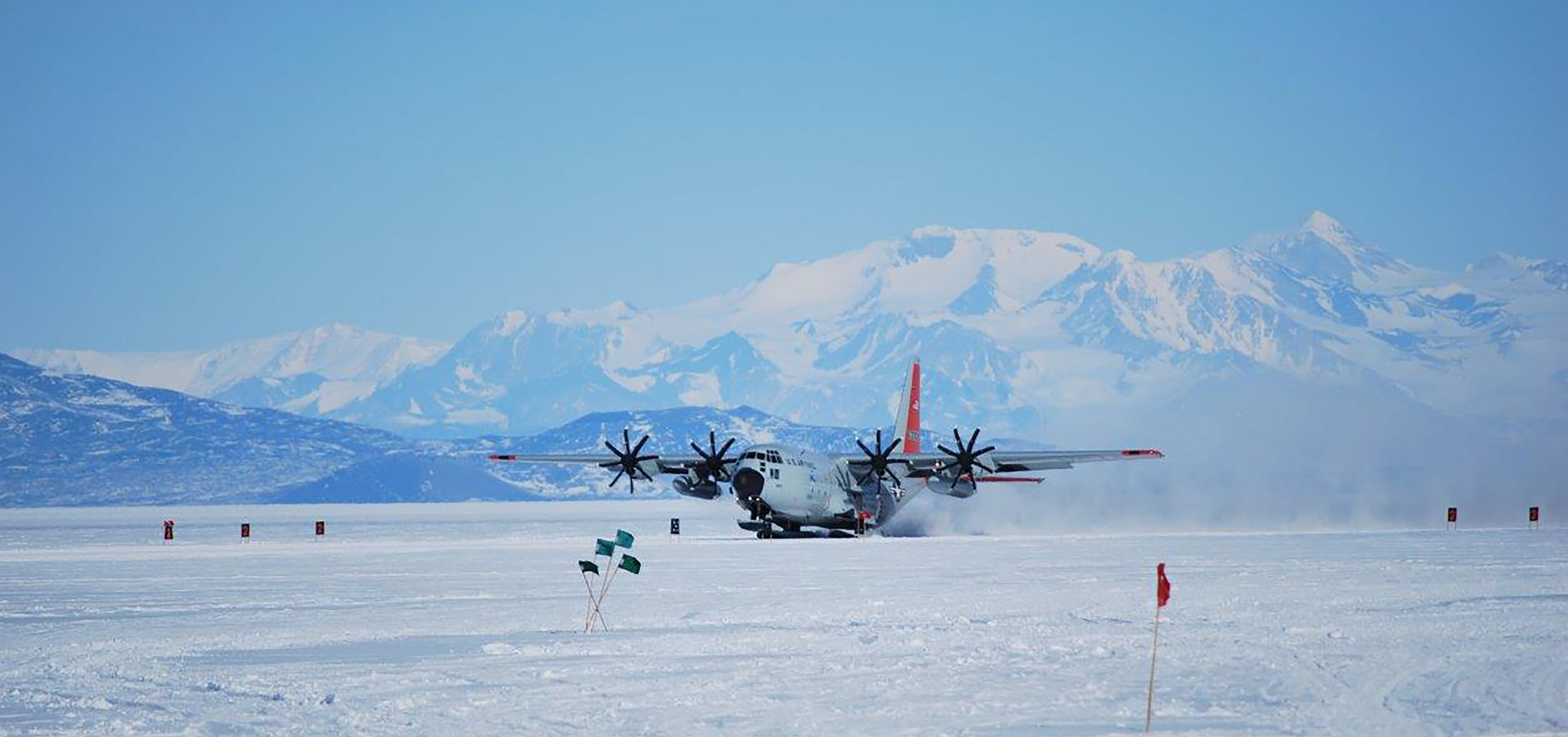
Ski-equipped LC-130 in Greenland, from the 109th Airlift Wing, 2016

The 109th Airlift Wing's mission is to provide airlift support to the National Science Foundation's South Pole and Arctic research programs by flying specialized LC-130H Hercules airlifters, modified with wheel-ski gear, in support of Arctic and Antarctic operations. The 109th Airlift Wing is the only unit in the world to fly these aircraft.

- 109th Operations Group

139th Airlift Squadron
139th Aeromedical Squadron
109th Operations Support Flight

- 109th Mission Support Group

109th Security Forces Squadron
109th Civil Engineer Squadron
109th Force Support Squadron
109th Aerial Port Flight
109th Logistics Readiness Squadron
109th Services Flight
109th Communications Flight

- 109th Maintenance Group

109th Aircraft Maintenance Squadron
109th Maintenance Squadron
109th Maintenance Operations Flight

- 109th Medical Group

=== 174th Attack Wing – Hancock Field Air National Guard Base, Syracuse ===
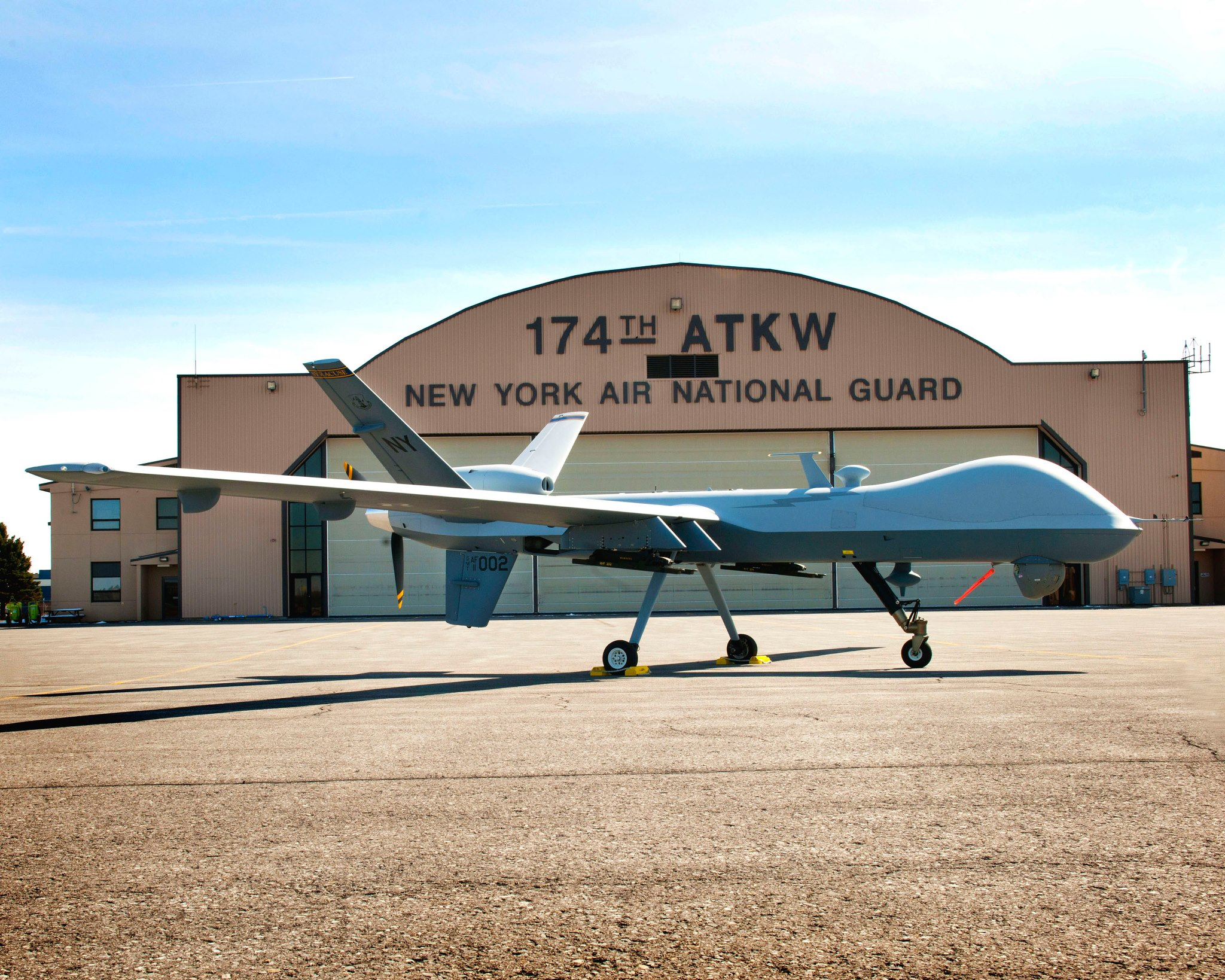
MQ-9 Reaper of the 174th Attack Wing

Currently operates the MQ-9 Reaper unmanned aerial vehicle (UAV). Its mission is to provide qualified airmen and weapon systems engaging in global air, space and cyberspace operations; supporting homeland defense, joint operations and aid to civil authorities at the direction of the Governor.

- 152nd Air Operations Group

274th Air Support Operations Squadron
Air and Space Communication Squadron
Air Intelligence Squadron
Combat Operations Squadron

Alternate version of the New York Air Guard emblem

- 174th Operations Group

108th Attack Squadron – MQ-9A Reaper
138th Attack Squadron – MQ-9A Reaper
174th Operation Support Squadron

- 174th Maintenance Group
- 174th Mission Support Group
- 174th Medical Group

=== Eastern Air Defense Sector – Griffiss Business and Technology Park, Rome ===
The Eastern Air Defense Sector originated in 1956 as the 4621st Air Defense Wing. It is one of two sectors that carries out NORAD's aerospace warning and control mission. The Eastern Air Defense Sector is part of the U.S. Continental NORAD Region. There are also Canadian and Alaskan NORAD regions. This unit also provides direct support for the annual NORAD Tracks Santa program.

== History ==
=== Origins ===
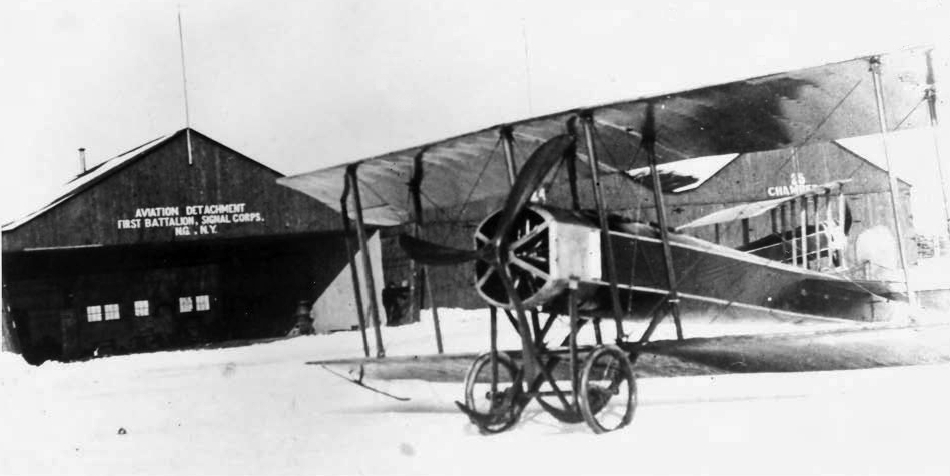
A Gallaudet C-2 of the 1st Aero Company in 1915

The Militia Act of 1903 established the present National Guard system, units raised by the states but paid for by the federal government, liable for immediate state service. If federalized by presidential order, they fall under the regular military chain of command. On 1 June 1920, the Militia Bureau issued Circular No.1 on organization of National Guard air units.

The New York Air National Guard origins date to 28 August 1917 with the establishment of the 102d Aero Squadron as part of the World War I American Expeditionary Force. Its origins begin however, on 30 April 1908 as the 1st Aero Company, a pre-World War I independent unit of the New York National Guard. The 1st Aero Company was provisionally recognized by the federal government in June 1916 and called to active duty between July 13, 1916, and November 15, 1916, to continue training with the purpose of joining the 1st Aero Squadron, a Regular Army unit deployed to Mexico with the Punitive Expedition. The 1st Aero Company, however, never left Long Island and was disbanded on May 23, 1917, shortly after the United States entered World War I, when the Army decided not to use national guard aviation units in the war effort. Its history and lineage were bestowed on the 102d Observation Squadron. The 102d Aero Squadron was demobilized 1918 Armistice with Germany in 1919.

=== New York National Guard ===
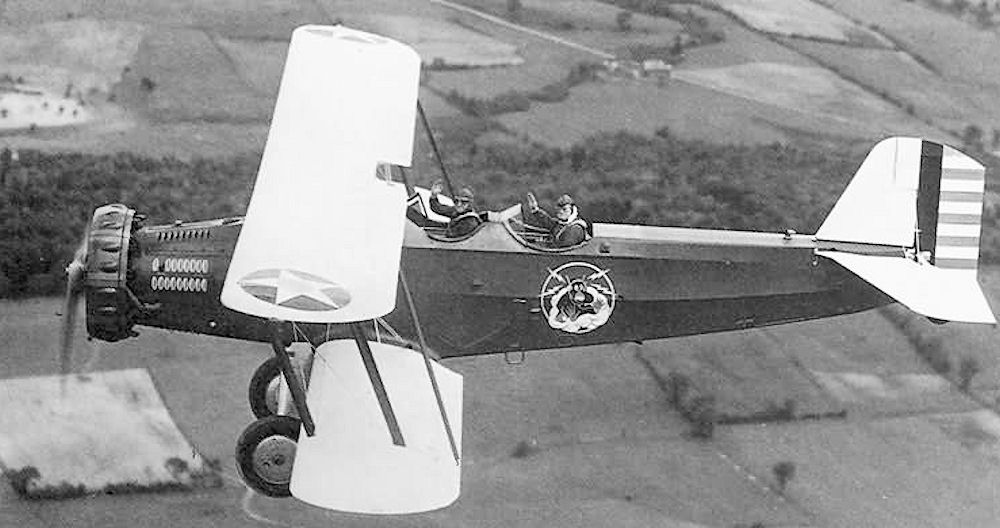
A Douglas O-38 of the 102d Observation Squadron at Miller Field in Staten Island, New York City, 1933. The squadron provided divisional aviation for the 27th Division of the New York National Guard. Note the squadron emblem on the side of the fuselage.

Constituted in 1920 as the 102nd Squadron (Observation), the squadron was assigned to the 27th Division, allotted to the state of New York, as its divisional aviation. The unit was organized in November 1921 from the "Observation Squadron, New York National Guard, which had been organized on 22 March 1921 at Hempstead, New York, with personnel from K Company, 14th Infantry, New York National Guard. It was reorganized and federally recognized in November 1922 at Miller Field on Staten Island and re-designated as the 102nd Observation Squadron in January 1923. It is one of the 29 original National Guard Observation Squadrons of the United States Army National Guard formed before World War II.

Its operations were primarily air transportation and aircraft repair and maintenance. However, squadron elements were called up periodically by the state of New York to perform emergency duties that included reconnaissance for the Treasury Department of vessels conducting illegal-liquor trade off the New York-New Jersey coast in the 1920s; support of flood relief efforts in Vermont 6–16 November 1927; aid to civil authorities during a prison break from the maximum security Auburn Prison, 11–12 December 1930; and flood relief efforts in upstate New York 11–13 July 1935.

The 102d Observation Squadron was ordered into active service on 15 October 1940 as part of the buildup of the Army Air Corps prior to the United States entry into World War II.

=== New York Air National Guard ===
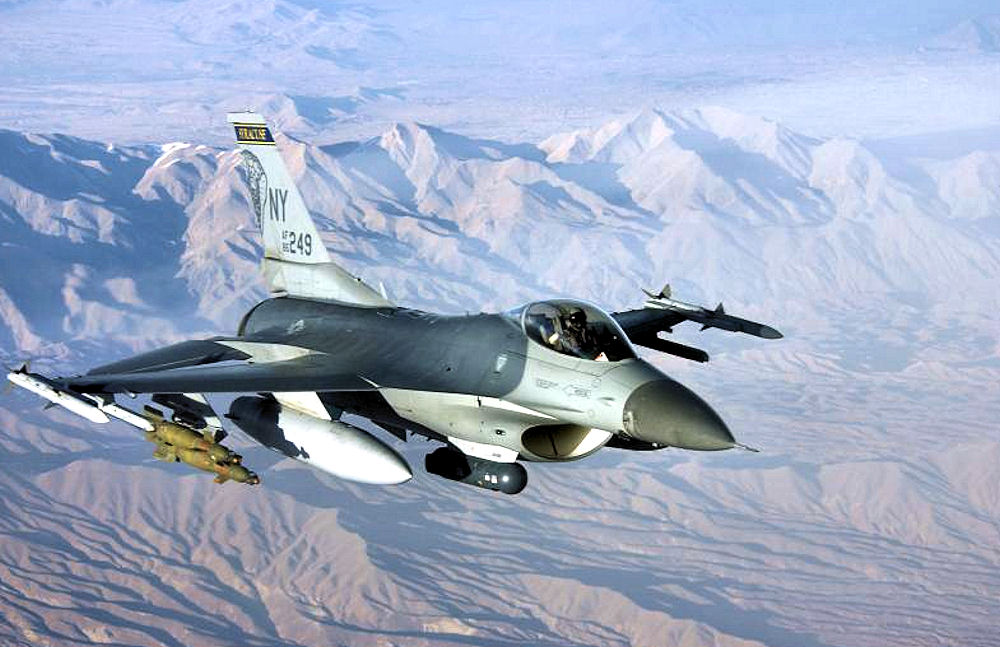
F-16C from the 138th Fighter Squadron flying over Afghanistan, November 29, 2003.

On 24 May 1946, the United States Army Air Forces, in response to dramatic postwar military budget cuts imposed by President Harry S. Truman, allocated inactive unit designations to the National Guard Bureau for the formation of an Air Force National Guard. These unit designations were allotted and transferred to various State National Guard bureaus to provide them unit designations to re-establish them as Air National Guard units.

The modern New York ANG received federal recognition on 20 February 1947 as the 102d Bombardment Squadron (Light) at Floyd Bennett Field, Brooklyn. It was equipped with B-26 Invaders and was assigned to Tactical Air Command. 18 September 1947, however, is considered the New York Air National Guard's official birth concurrent with the establishment of the United States Air Force as a separate branch of the United States military under the National Security Act.

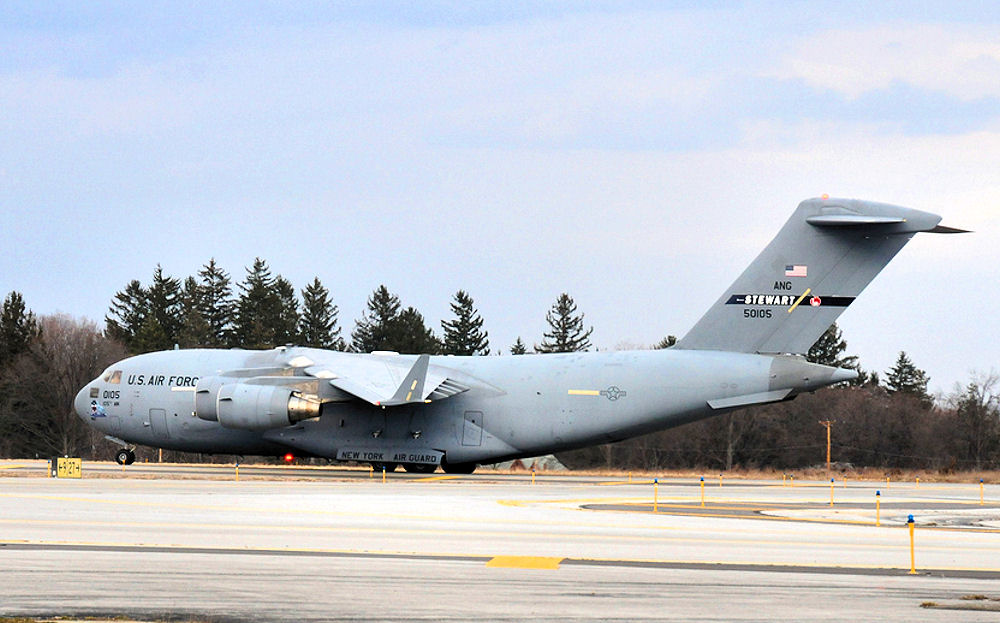
C-17 Globemaster III from the 105th Airlift Wing at Stewart Air National Guard Base, March 8, 2012.

The allocations to the New York ANG included the 52d Fighter Wing, a command and control organization at Westchester County Airport, receiving federal recognition on 3 October 1947; the 139th Fighter Squadron at Schenectady County Airport on 18 October 1948; the 136th Fighter Squadron at Niagara Falls International Airport and the 137th Fighter Squadron at Westchester County Airport on 8 December 1948. All of these squadrons were equipped with F-51 Mustangs and assumed an air defense missions over various areas of the state.

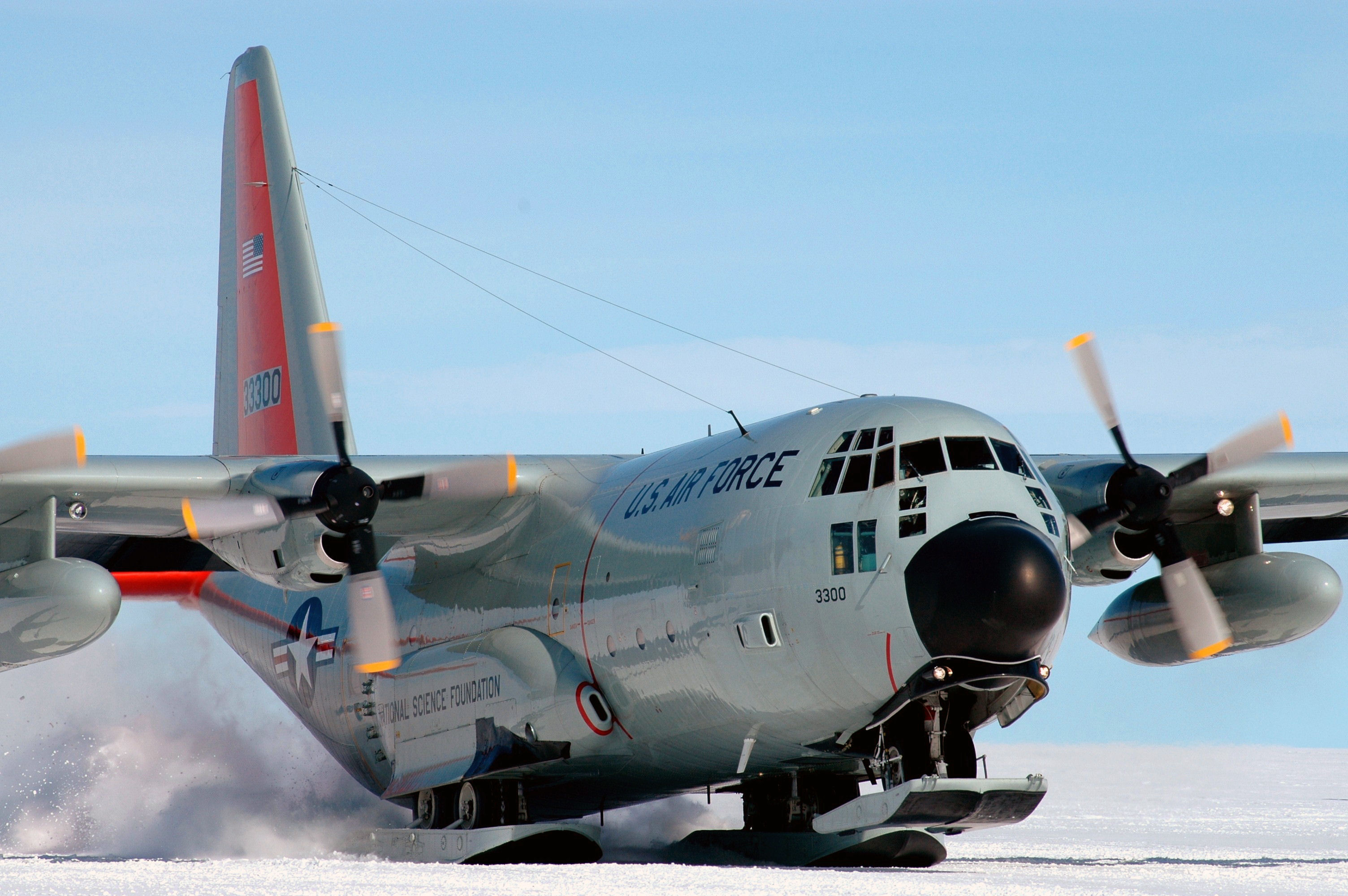
A Lockheed LC-130H Hercules of the 139th Airlift Squadron takes off from Ice Station Ruby, Greenland, the training facility of the 109th Airlift Wing at the former DYE-2 DEW site

At the end of October 1950, the ANG converted to the wing-base (Hobson Plan) organization. As a result, the 52d Fighter Wing was withdrawn from the New York ANG and inactivated on 31 October 1950. The 106th Bombardment Wing at Brooklyn, and the 107th Fighter Wing at Niagara Falls were formed and were simultaneously allotted to the NY ANG and activated to replace the 52d.

In 1956, the 137th Fighter-Interceptor Squadron at Westchester County Airport was authorized to expand to a group level and the 105th Fighter Group (Air Defense) received federal recognition and activated on 1 May 1956. In addition, the 109th FIS at Schenectady expanded into the 109th Fighter Group (Air Defense) the same date. 1962 saw the expansion of the 138th Tactical Fighter Squadron into the 174th Tactical Fighter Group at Syracuse.

Today, the New York Air National Guard is the largest and most diverse ANG organization of the National Guard Bureau. After the September 11th, 2001 terrorist attacks on the United States, elements of every Air National Guard unit in New York has been activated in support of the global war on terrorism. Flight crews, aircraft maintenance personnel, communications technicians, air controllers and air security personnel were engaged in Operation Noble Eagle air defense overflights of major United States cities. Also, New York ANG units have been deployed overseas as part of Operation Enduring Freedom in Afghanistan and Operation Iraqi Freedom in Iraq as well as other locations as directed.

== See also ==
- New York Guard
- New York Naval Militia
- New York Wing Civil Air Patrol
