= 106th Rescue Wing =

106th Rescue Wing

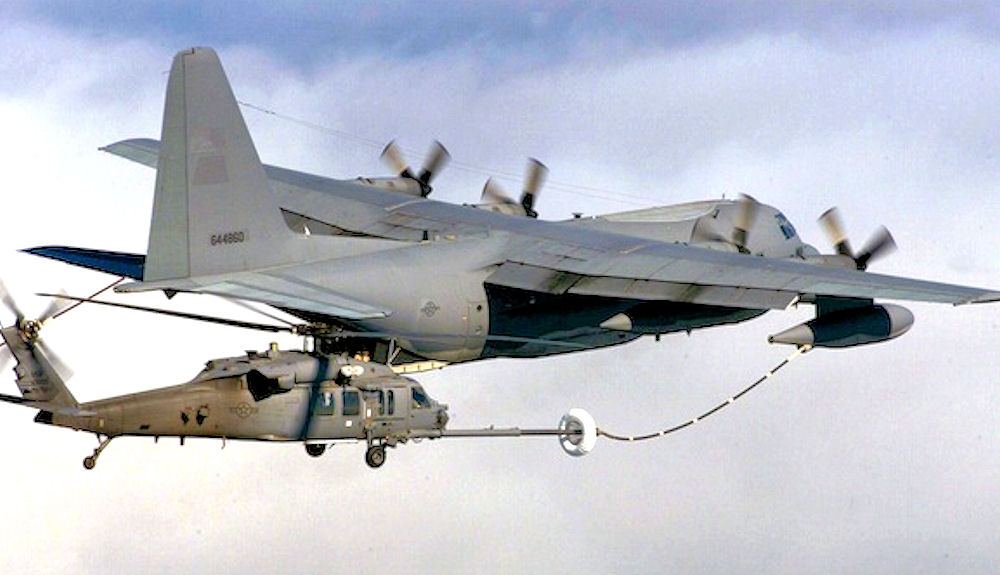
- 106th Rescue Wing HC-130 refuelling an HH-60 Pave Hawk over Long Island, New York
- Active: 1943–1945; 1947–1952; 1952–1969; 1969–1972; 1972–present
- Country: United States
- Allegiance: New York
- Branch: Air National Guard
- Type: Wing
- Role: Combat Search and Rescue
- Size: About 1,000
- Part of: New York Air National Guard
- Garrison/HQ: Francis S. Gabreski Air National Guard Base, Westhampton Beach, New York
- Motto: That Others May Live
- Engagements: European Theater of Operations
- Decorations: Distinguished Unit Citation French Croix de Guerre with Palm

Commanders
- Current commander: Col. Jeffrey D. Cannet

Insignia
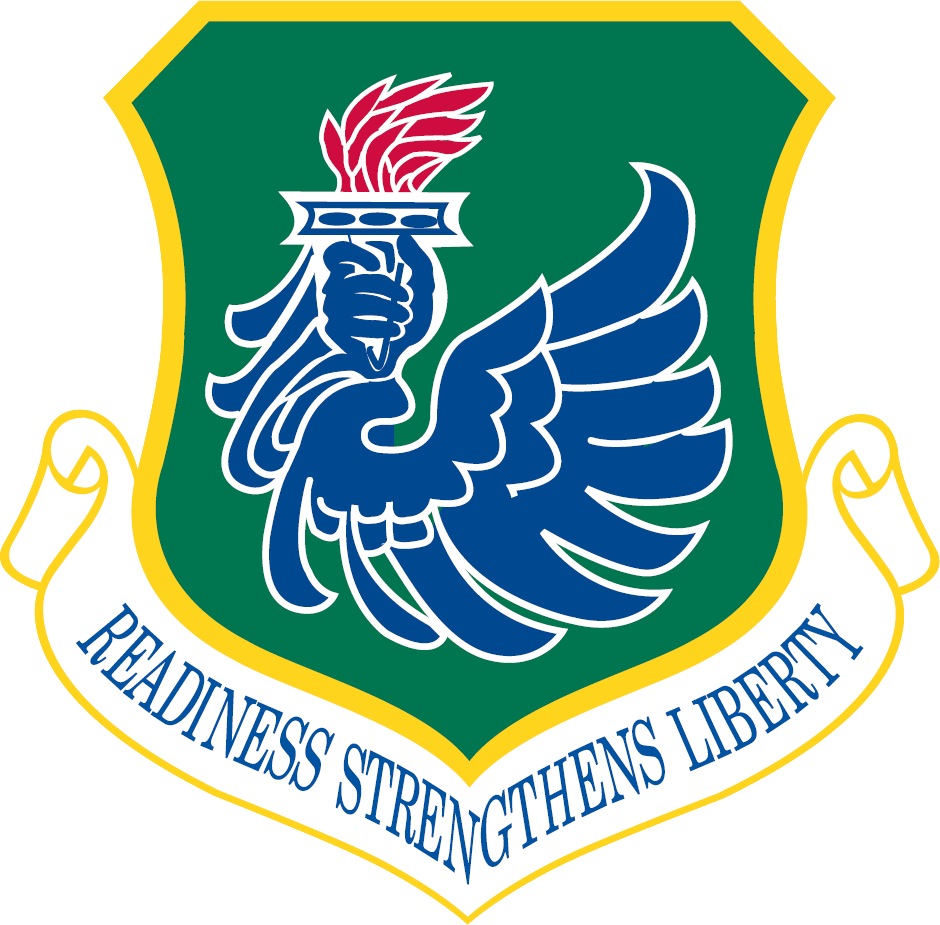
- 106th Rescue Wing emblem
- Tail code: LI

Aircraft flown
- Helicopter: HH-60W Jolly Green II
- Transport: HC-130J Combat King II

The 106th Rescue Wing is a unit of the New York Air National Guard, stationed at Francis S. Gabreski Air National Guard Base, Westhampton Beach, New York. If activated to federal service, the Wing is gained by the United States Air Force Air Combat Command.

The wing's operations group consists of three squadrons: the 101st Rescue Squadron, which uses the HH-60W Jolly Green II helicopters; the 102d Rescue Squadron, which uses the HC-130J Combat King II airplane; and the 103d Rescue Squadron, which is made up of Air Force Pararescuemen (PJs) and Combat Rescue Officers (CROs) that use both aircraft. The 102d Rescue Squadron is a descendant organization of the World War I 102d Aero Squadron, established on 23 August 1917. It was reformed on 4 November 1922, as the 102d Observation Squadron, and is one of the 29 original National Guard Observation Squadrons of the United States Army National Guard formed before World War II. The squadron has a history going back to 30 April 1908, and is the oldest unit of the New York Air National Guard.

The group itself traces its history to the 394th Bombardment Group, which flew Martin B-26 Marauders in the European theater of World War II.

== Mission ==
The 106th Rescue Wing deploys worldwide to provide combat search and rescue coverage for U.S. and allied forces. Combat search and rescue missions include flying low-level, preferably at night aided with night vision goggles, to an objective area where aerial refueling of a rescue helicopter is performed, or pararescue teams are deployed.

During peacetime, the unit also provides search and rescue services to the maritime community, supports the US Coast Guard in missions outside their capabilities as well as NASA.

== Units ==
The 106th Rescue Wing consists of the following major units:

- 106th Operations Group
  - 101st Rescue Squadron*, HH-60W Jolly Green II
  - 102d Rescue Squadron*, HC-130J Combat King II
  - 103d Rescue Squadron*, pararescue personnel (Note: In 2004, Air Force Special Operations Command re-organized Air National Guard rescue wings, establishing separate squadrons for fixed-wing, helicopter and pararescue.)
  - 106th Operation Support Squadron
- 106th Maintenance Group
  - 106th Aircraft Maintenance Squadron
  - 106th Maintenance Squadron
  - 106th Maintenance Operations Flight
- 106th Medical Group
- 106th Mission Support Group
  - 106th Security Forces Squadron
  - 106th Civil Engineer Squadron
  - 106th Aerial Port Flight
  - 106th Logistics Readiness Squadron
  - 106th Services Flight
  - 106th Communications Squadron
- 106th Force Support Squadron
  - 106th Personnel Flight
  - 106th Honor Guard

== History ==
=== World War II ===
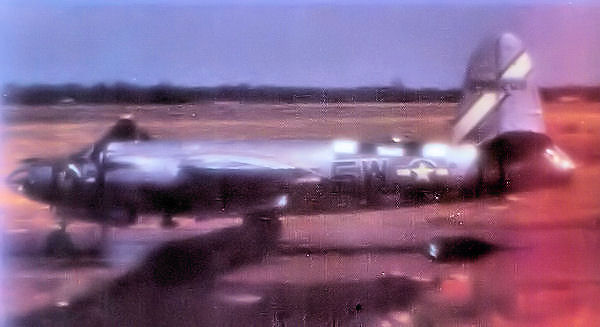
Martin B-26G-5-MA Marauder, AAF Ser No. 43-34373, of the 587th Bomb Squadron.

The organization was constituted as the 394th Bombardment Group (Medium) on 15 February 1943, and activated on 5 March 1943. Trained with B-26s. All four squadrons of the group, under the command of Lt. Colonel Thomas B. Hall, were briefly stationed at Ardmore Army Air Field for five weeks in July-August 1943. The group was then moved again, on August 19, 1943, to Kellogg Field, Battle Creek, Michigan.

The group was dispatched overseas to RAF Boreham, Essex, in the United Kingdom, February–March 1944, and assigned to the 98th Combat Bombardment Wing (Medium) of the Ninth Air Force. Their group marking was a white diagonal band across the fin and rudder. When the first Martin B-26 Marauders of the Group arrived some hardstands and buildings were still being built. Operations commenced only 12 days after the majority of the group arrived with the initial mission being flown on 23 March. In the weeks that followed, the 394th was repeatedly sent to attack bridges in occupied France and the Low Countries, which led to its dubbing itself "The Bridge Busters." A total of 96 missions, on which 5,453 tons of bombs were dropped, were flown from Boreham before the group was moved on 24 July to RAF Holmsley South in the New Forest due to the urgent requirement of IX Bomber Command to extend the radius of action of part of its Martin B-26 Marauder force.

There was no break in operations at this critical period when the Saint-Lô offensive was underway. The 394th received a Distinguished Unit Citation for its flying during the period 7–9 August, when it made a series of attacks against heavily defended targets, destroying four rail bridges and devastating an ammunition dump.

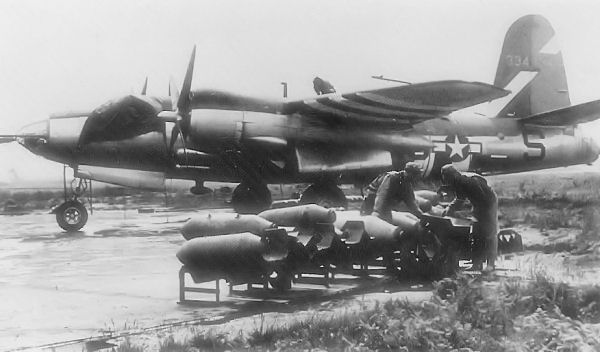
Loading bombs on Martin B-26G-1-MA Marauder, AAF Ser. No. 43-34194, of the 584th Bomb Squadron.

It was during a bridge attack on 9 August that the lead B-26, piloted by Captain Darrell R. Lindsey, was hit by anti-aircraft fire and the right engine set alight. Although knowing that the fuel tanks were likely to catch fire and explode, Lindsey did not waver from leading the bomb run or order his crew to bail out until after bombs had been released. The bombardier offered to lower the nosewheel so that Lindsey might escape through the nose hatch but, knowing the likelihood of his losing control if this was done, Lindsey ordered the bombardier to jump. Lindsey did not escape before the aircraft crashed.

The award of a posthumous Medal of Honor was the only occasion that this highest US award for bravery went to a Ninth Air Force bomber crewman serving in the ETO. All told, six 394th B-26s were lost in operations from Holmsley South. The group's aircraft began to move to the airfield at Tour-en-Bessin in France (A-13) on 21 August and the last personnel left Holmesley South on the 31st.

On the continent the group hit strong points at Brest and then began to operate against targets in Germany. Took part in the Battle of the Bulge, December 1944 – January 1945, by hitting communications to deprive the enemy of supplies and reinforcements. Bombed transportation, storage facilities, and other objectives until the war ended; also dropped propaganda leaflets.

By VE-Day, the 394th was based at Venlo (Y-55) in the southeastern Netherlands. The group remained in the theater to serve with United States Air Forces in Europe as part of the army of occupation at Kitzingen, Germany. It was transferred, without personnel and equipment, to the United States on 15 February 1946 and was inactivated on 31 March 1946.

=== New York Air National Guard ===
The wartime 394th Bombardment Group was redesignated the 106th Bombardment Group (Light), and was allotted to the National Guard, on 24 May 1946. It was organized at Floyd Bennett Field, Brooklyn, New York, and was extended federal recognition on 21 March 1947 and activated by the National Guard Bureau. The 106th Bombardment Group was assigned to the 52d Fighter Wing.

The Group was assigned the 106th and 114th Bombardment Squadrons, both equipped with B-26 Invader attack bombers. Its mission was to train in proficiency with the B-26 and obtain operational readiness with the aircraft. In the postwar era, the Air National Guard was like a flying club for the many World War II veterans that filled its ranks. Parts were no problem and many of the maintenance personnel were experienced from wartime duty, so readiness was quite high, and the planes were often much better maintained than their USAF counterparts. A pilot could often show up at the field, check out an aircraft and go flying. However, the unit also had regular military exercises that kept up proficiency and in gunnery and bombing contests they would often score at least as well or better than active-duty USAF units, given the fact that most ANG pilots were World War II combat veterans.

In October 1950, the Air National Guard converted to the wing-base (Hobson Plan) organization. As a result, the 52d Fighter Wing was withdrawn from the Air National Guard and inactivated on 31 October 1950. The 106th Bombardment Wing was activated as one of two new NY ANG Wings (the other being the 107th Fighter Wing at Niagara Falls Airport) which replaced it, both reporting directly to the New York National Guard Adjutant general in Albany.

==== Korean War activation ====
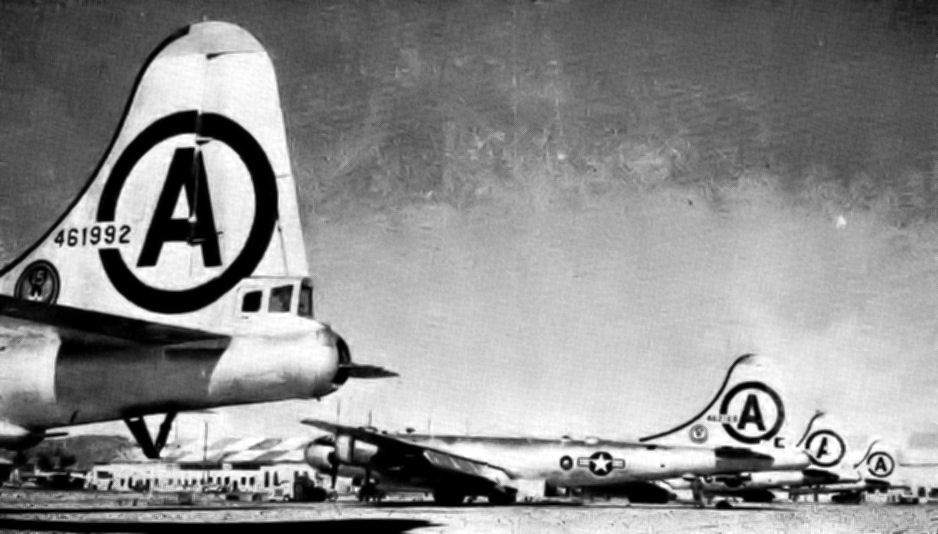
106th Bombardment Wing B-29 Superfortresses at March AFB, 1951

With the surprise invasion of South Korea on 25 June 1950, and the regular military's complete lack of readiness, most of the Air National Guard was federalized placed on active duty on 1 February 1951. The 102d and 114th's B-26 light attack bombers were sent to Fifth Air Force in Japan for use in the Korean War, and the 106th Bomb Group was federalized and assigned to Strategic Air Command. On 28 March 1951, the Wing was deployed less equipment to March Air Force Base, California. The 106th was re-equipped with Boeing B-29 Superfortresses and given the mission to train reservist crewmen to back-fill rotating B-29 combat crews serving in Korea. While the air guardsmen were undergoing training they were paid on the lesser reserve pay scale. The personnel and equipment at March were re-designated as the 320th Bombardment Wing in December 1952 and the 106th Bomb Wing was returned to New York state control.

==== Cold War ====
With its return to New York state control in 1953, the 106th was again equipped with B-26 Invaders, the aircraft being returned from combat duty in Korea. The 102d trained in proficiency with the attack bomber until the removal of the B-26 from bombing duties in 1956 as neared the end of their service lives.

The 106th was transferred from Tactical Air Command to Air Defense Command (ADC) and assumed an air defense mission over Long Island and New York City, entering the Jet Age with the limited all-weather F-94B Starfire interceptor. With the Starfire, the 102d began standing end of runway air defense alert, ready to launch interceptors if ADC Ground Intercept Radar picked up an unidentified target. The squadron stood air defense alert from one hour before sunrise until one hour after sunset every day, 365 days a year. In 1957, ADC upgraded the 102d Fighter-Interceptor Squadron to the all-weather F-86D Sabre Interceptor. With the receipt of the F-86D, the alert mission was extended to 24 hours a day/7 days a week/365 days a year.

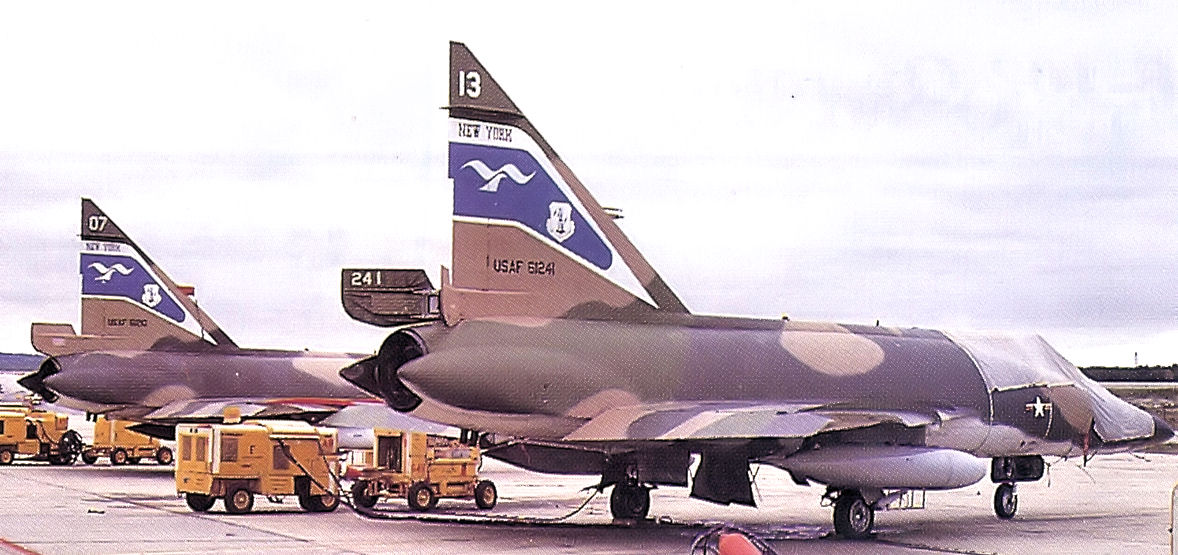
102d Fighter-Interceptor Squadron – Convair F-102A-70-CO Delta Dagger 56-1241. Photographed in September 1974, the 102d FIS was unusual in the fact that its interceptors carried an unusual color tactical camouflage motif.

In 1956, Lt. Col. Norma Parsons made military and National Guard history when she became the first woman member of the National Guard, the first woman member of the Air National Guard, and the first woman to be commissioned in the Air National Guard.

The State of New York was notified by HQ United States Air Force on 26 September 1957 that support for the 114th Fighter-Interceptor Squadron would be ended due to fiscal constraints. Despite protests from the Governor of New York State that this was in violation of the law with respect to State militia units, the Air Force eventually prevailed and the 114th FIS was inactivated on 30 September 1958.

As a result of an agreement between the New York Governor's office and the Air Force, under which the State accepted a new aeromedical transport assignment, thereby preserving the military-reserve careers of most of the 106th personnel and, at the same time, provided the State with a valuable airlift potential. The new 106th Aeromedical Transport Group was reassigned to Military Air Transport Service (MATS), The 106th worked closely with the 1st Aeromedical Transport Group at Kelly Air Force Base, San Antonio, Texas, a regular Air Force unit.

Initially equipped with specialized MC-119J Flying Boxcars configured for transport of wounded and injured, the 102d Aeromedical Transport Squadron airlifted critically injured and sick personnel until 1964. With air transportation recognized as a critical wartime need, the 102d was re-designated the 102d Air Transport Squadron (Heavy) in January 1964 and equipped with C-97 Stratofreighter heavy transports.. With the C-97s, the 102d augmented MATS airlift capability worldwide in support of the Air Force's needs in Europe. It also flew scheduled MATS transport missions to Europe, Africa the Caribbean and South America.

With the acquisition of KC-97 Stratotankers from Strategic Air Command, the 104th was transferred back to Tactical Air Command in September 1969 and the 106th became an air refueling group. Its mission was to provide aerial refueling to tactical fighters. With the KC-97 being a variant of the C-97 Stratofreighter the conversion of the unit from transports to refueling aircraft was easily accomplished, the squadron receiving the KC-97Ls with addition of jet engine pods mounted to the outboard wings. It rotated personnel and aircraft to West Germany as part of Operation Creek Party, a continuous rotational mission flying from Rhein Main Air Base, West Germany, providing air refueling to United States Air Forces in Europe (USAFE) tactical aircraft. The success of this operation, which would continue until 1972, demonstrated the ability of the Air National Guard to perform significant day-to-day missions without being mobilized.

In 1969, the Air Force closed Suffolk County Air Force Base and the NYANG relocated there. The 102d Air Refueling Squadron returned to Air Defense Command in 1972 and again became an air defense unit. The 102d was re-equipped with the F-102A Delta Dagger, which was being replaced in the active duty interceptor force by the F-106. The Mach-2 "Deuce", still a very potent interceptor, served with the 106th FIG until June 1975, when Aerospace Defense Command was reducing the USAF interceptor force as the threat of Soviet Bombers attacking the United States was deemed remote.

==== Rescue mission ====
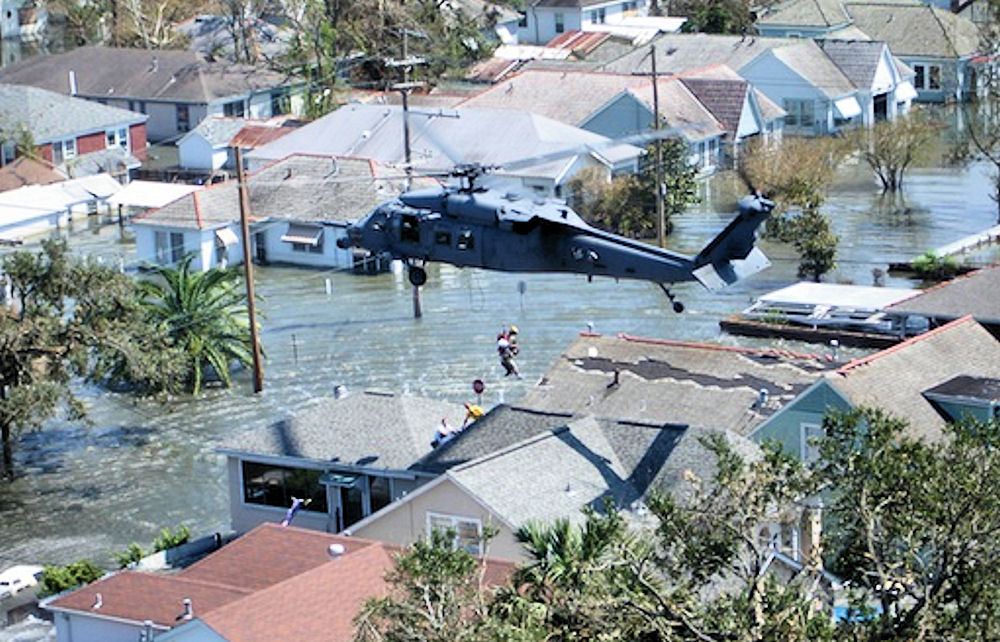
101st Rescue Squadron – Hurricane Katrina Rescue, 2005

The 102d converted to an Aerospace Rescue and Recovery Squadron in 1975, flying Sikorsky HH-3E rescue helicopters and HC-130 Hercules tankers for in-flight refueling. The squadron's base on Long Island enables it to act as the only Air Force rescue organization in the northeastern United States. It upgraded its inventory to provide a capability for long range over-water missions using the aerial refueling capabilities of the HC-130s and Sikorsky HH-60G Pave Hawk rescue helicopters.

After the midair explosion of the Space Shuttle "Challenger" in 1986, the 106th Rescue Wing was designated to provide support for every shuttle launch thereafter.

In October 1991, an HH-60 and a tanker flew to an endangered sailboat about 250 miles south of its base. The Pave Hawk and HC-130 dropped survival gear to the vessel, which was riding out the storm, and began their return to base. Both aircraft encountered severe weather conditions and the helicopter was unable to take on fuel.

The HH-60 was forced to ditch in the Atlantic Ocean about 60 miles south of the base in what would later become known as "the Perfect Storm", and all but one member of the crew were saved by the crew of the United States Coast Guard cutter Tamaroa. Technical Sergeant Arden Smith, a pararescueman (PJ), lost his life fulfilling the squadron's motto That Others May Live. The mission was recounted in both a best-selling book and major motion picture.

From 1991 to 2002, the 102d RS deployed personnel and aircraft to support Operation Northern Watch in Turkey and Operation Southern Watch in Kuwait and Saudi Arabia. While supporting Operation Iraqi Freedom, the squadron made its first two combat rescues on 2 November 2003 by using a hydraulic rescue tool to extricate two injured soldiers trapped in the burning wreckage of an Army CH-47 Chinook helicopter shot down near Fallujah.

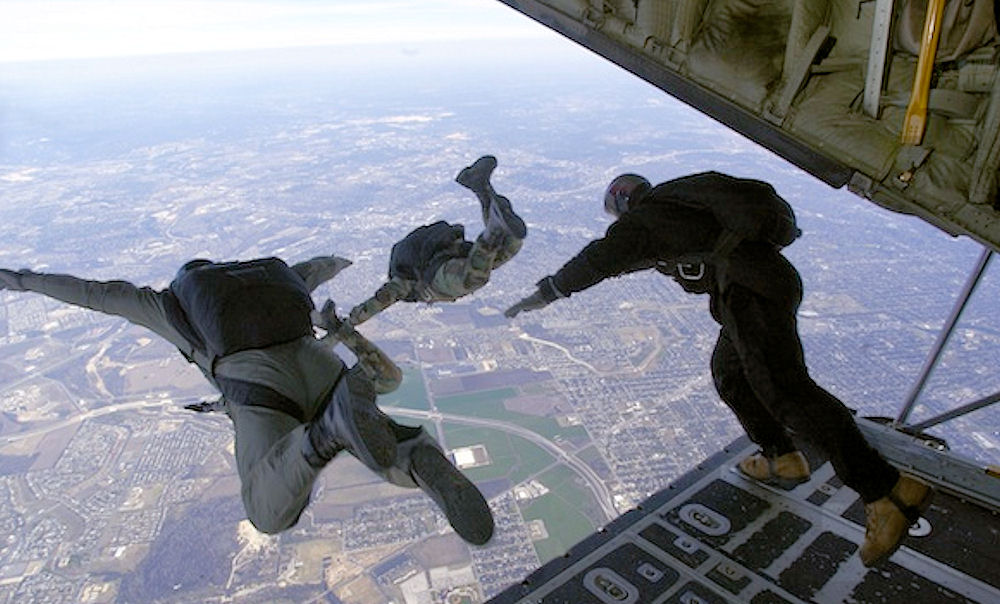
103d Rescue Squadron – Pararescue airmen jumping out of HC-130 Hercules.

The 102d RS received international recognition when two aircrews and PJs of the squadron successfully completed the "longest over-water rescue with a helicopter in aviation history" in December 1994, a mission in which a pair of HH-60s flew to Halifax, Nova Scotia, and then 750 miles out over the Atlantic Ocean to search for survivors of the Ukrainian cargo ship Salvador Allende. A search of the area located the last survivor, and PJ TSGT James Dougherty jumped into the ocean to effect the rescue. During the 15-hour mission, the two helicopter crews were refueled in flight 10 times by HC-130s. The rescue was made famous by the book Pararescue: The True Story of an Incredible Rescue at Sea and the Heroes Who Pulled It Off, written by Michael Hirsh

The 106th Rescue Wing has assisted the state in battling the 1995 "Sunrise Wildfires" in the Hamptons, they were first on the scene after the crash of TWA Flight 800, and the recovery of the wreckage from the plane flown by John F. Kennedy Jr., which crashed into the Atlantic Ocean in 1999. The squadron located the transponder of the wreckage of the plane underwater.

On 11 September 2001, the first ANG personnel on scene at World Trade Center were those of the 106th Rescue Wing.

In 2004, Air Force Special Operations Command re-organized Air National Guard rescue wings, establishing separate squadrons for fixed-wing, helicopter and pararescue. The squadron transferred its HH-60G Pave Hawk helicopters to the 101st Rescue Squadron; its pararescue personnel to the 103d Rescue Squadron.

In October 2006, all Air Force combat search and rescue forces were reassigned back to Air Combat Command.

October 2012 saw 150 Airmen of the 106th Rescue Wing deploy as part of more than 2,300 Soldiers and Airmen to prepare flood defences before Subtropical Storm Sandy made landfall.

Between 6 Sep and Sept. 2017 the wing deployed 126 Airmen, three HH-60 Pave Hawk helicopters and two HC-130 search and rescue aircraft to the Caribbean in the aftermath hurricanes Maria and Irma. The unit flew cargo missions delivering vital aid to U.S. Virgin Islands, Puerto Rico and its aircraft took part in the evacuation of American civilians from St. Maarten.

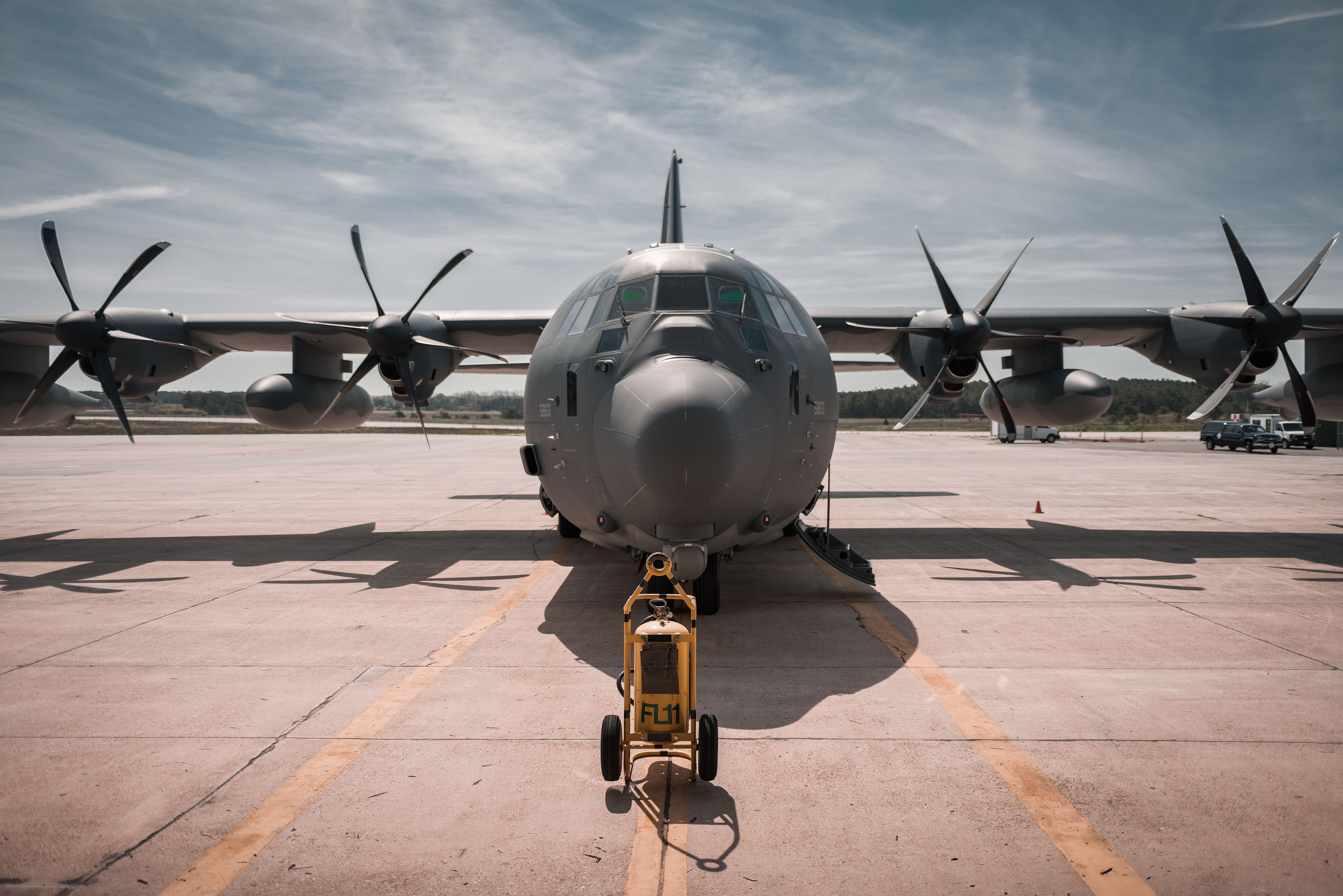
HC-130J Combat King II of the 106th Rescue Wing

On 15 March 2018 four of the wing's guardsmen were killed when the HH-60G Pave Hawk rescue helicopter they were flying crashed near the city of Al-Qa'im in western Iraq. The personnel were deployed as part of Operation Inherent Resolve, the American-led coalition operation to defeat ISIS in Iraq and Syria.

During September 2018 the 106th deploy aircraft and personnel to Dover Air Force Base in Delaware and Naval Air Station Oceana at Norfolk, Virginia to rescue civilians in The Carolinas after Hurricane Florence had struck.

On 17 May 2019 the wing took delivery of the first of four new HC-130J Combat King IIs named "Spirit of Long Island", to replace the wing's aging HC-130P/Ns

July 2019 saw the wing take part in Exercise Northern Strike 2019 at the Camp Grayling Joint Maneuver Training Center and the Alpena Combat Readiness Training Center, both in northern Michigan.

The squadron's last HH-60G sortie was conducted on 30 August 2024.

On 12 September 2024, 106th RQS received the first of six HH-60W Jolly Green II, this also marked the first delivery of the variant to the Air National Guard.

== Lineage ==
106th Military Airlift Group

- Constituted as the 394th Bombardment Group (Medium) on 15 February 1943

Activated on 5 March 1943

- Redesignated 394th Bombardment Group, Light on 3 December 1945

Inactivated on 31 March 1946

- Redesignated: 106th Bombardment Group, Light and allotted to the National Guard on 24 May 1946

Activated on 1 March 1947
Extended federal recognition on 21 March 1947
Redesignated 106th Composite Group on 1 November 1950
Redesignated 106th Bombardment Group, Light on 1 February 1951
Federalized and ordered to active service on 1 March 1951
Redesignated 106th Bombardment Group, Medium on 1 May 1951
Inactivated on 16 June 1952
Returned to New York state control on 1 December 1952

- Redesignated 106th Bombardment Group, Light and activated on 1 December 1952
- Redesignated 106th Bombardment Group, Tactical in 1955

Redesignated 106th Fighter Group (Air Defense) on 1 July 1956
Redesignated 106th Aeromedical Transport Group, Light on 14 September 1958
Redesignated 106th Air Transport Group, Heavy on 1 January 1963
Redesignated 106th Military Airlift Group on 8 January 1966
Inactivated on 16 September 1969
Consolidated with the 106th Air Refueling Group and the 106th Aerospace Rescue and Recovery Group on 18 August 1987

106th Air Refueling Group
Constituted as the 106th Air Refueling Group on 16 May 1969
Activated on 17 September 1969
Inactivated on 1 December 1972
Consolidated with the 106th Military Airlift Group and the 106th Aerospace Rescue and Recovery Group on 18 August 1987

106th Rescue Wing
Constituted as the 106th Fighter Group on 30 May 1972
Redesignated 106th Fighter-Interceptor Group
Activated on 2 December 1972
Redesignated 106th Aerospace Rescue & Recovery Group on 3 May 1975
Consolidated with the 106th Military Airlift Group and the 106th Air Refueling Group on 18 August 1987
Redesignated 106th Air Rescue Group on 1 October 1989
Redesignated 106th Rescue Group on 16 March 1992
Redesignated 106th Rescue Wing on 1 October 1995

=== Assignments ===
- Third Air Force,5 March 1943
- Fourth Air Force, 12 July 1943
- First Air Force, 19 August 1943 – 15 February 1943
- 98th Combat Bombardment Wing (Medium), 11 March 1944
- United States Air Forces in Europe (attached to XII Fighter Command), September 1945
- Continental Air Forces (later Strategic Air Command), 15 February 1946 – 31 March 1946 (not operational)
- 52d Fighter Wing, 21 March 1947
- 106th Composite Wing (later 106th Bombardment Wing), 1 November 1950 – 16 June 1952
- 106th Bombardment Wing (later 106th Air Defense Wing), 1 December 1952
- New York Air National Guard, 14 September 1958
- 106th Air Transport Wing (later 106th Military Airlift Wing, 106th Air Refueling Wing, 106th Fighter-Interceptor Wing), 11 February 1964
- New York Air National Guard, 3 May 1975 – present

Gaining Commands after 1952
Gained by Tactical Air Command
Gained by Air Defense Command, 1 July 1956
Gained by Military Air Transport Service, 1 July 1958
Gained by Military Airlift Command, 1 January 1966
Gained by Tactical Air Command, 17 September 1969
Gained by Aerospace Defense Command, 2 December 1972
Gained by Military Airlift Command, 14 June 1975
Gained by Air Combat Command, 1 June 1992
Gained by Air Force Special Operations Command, 1 October 2003
Gained by Air Combat Command, 1 October 2005 – present

=== Components ===
World War II

- 584th Bombardment Squadron, 5 March 1943 – 31 March 1946
- 585th Bombardment Squadron, 5 March 1943 – 31 March 1946
- 586th Bombardment Squadron, 5 March 1943 – 31 March 1946
- 587th Bombardment Squadron, 5 March 1943 – 31 March 1946

Air National Guard

- 106th Operations Group, 1 March 1994 – present
- 106th Logistics Group (later 106th Maintenance Group): 1 October 1995 – present
- 106th Support Group (later 106th Mission Support Group): 1 October 1995 – present
- 102d Bombardment Squadron (later 102d Fighter-Interceptor Squadron, 102d Aeromedical Transport Squadron, 102dh Air Transport Squadron, 102d Military Airlift Squadron, 102d Air Refueling Squadron, 102d Aerospace Rescue & Recovery Squadron, 102d Air Rescue Squadron, 102d Rescue Squadron), 1 November 1950 – 16 June 1952; 1 December 1952 – 1 March 1994
- 106th Bombardment Squadron, 21 March 1947 – 1 February 1951
- 112th Bombardment Squadron, 21 March 1947 – 1 October 1950
- 114th Bombardment Squadron (later 114th Fighter-Interceptor Squadron), 19 June 1947 – 16 June 1952, 1 December 1952 – 14 September 1958
- 137th Fighter Squadron (later 137th Aeromedical Transport Squadron), 1 November 1950 – 1 February 1951, 1 February 1961 – c. 1 December 1963
- 140th Aeromedical Transport Squadron, 14 September 1958 – 1962
- 145th Aeromedical Transport Squadron, 14 September 1958 – 8 July 1961
- 147th Aeromedical Transport Squadron, 1 May 1961 – 15 February 1964
- 149th Fighter-Interceptor Squadron, 15 September 1957 – 10 April 1958
- 150th Aeromedical Transport Squadron (later 150th Transport Squadron), 14 September 1958 – 1 January 1964
- 167th Aeromedical Transport Squadron, 1 April 1961 – 10 December 1963

Strategic Air Command

=== Stations ===
- MacDill Field, Florida, 5 March 1943
- Ardmore Army Air Field, Oklahoma, 12 July 1943
- Kellogg Field, Michigan, 19 August 1943 – 15 February 1944
- RAF Boreham (AAF-161), England c. 11 March 1944
- RAF Holmsley South (AAF-455), England, 24 July 1944
- Tour-en-Bessin Airfield (A-13), France, 25 August 1944
- Orleans/Bricy Airfield (A-50), France, 18 September 1944
- Cambrai/Niergnies Airfield (A-74), France, 8 October 1944
- Venlo Airfield (Y-55), Netherlands, 2 May 1945
- AAF Station Kitzingen, Germany, September 1945 – 15 February 1946
- Floyd Bennett Field, Brooklyn, New York, 21 March 1947
- Suffolk County Air National Guard Base, New York, 1 June 1970

Renamed: Francis S. Gabreski Air National Guard Base, New York, 1991 – present

=== Aircraft ===
- Martin B-26 Marauder, 1943–1946
- Douglas B-26 Invader, 1947–1951; 1952–1955
- Boeing B-29 Superfortress, 1951–1952
- Lockheed F-94B Starfire, 1956–1957
- North American F-86D Sabre, 1957–1958
- Fairchild MC-119J Flying Boxcar, 1958–1964
- Boeing C-97A/G Stratofreighter, 1964–1969
- Boeing KC-97L Stratotanker, 1969–1972
- Convair F-102A Delta Dagger, 1972–1975
- HH-3E Jolly Green Giant, 1975–1990
- Lockheed HC-130P Hercules, 1975–2019
- Lockheed HC-130N Combat King, 1988–2019
- Sikorsky HH-60G Pavehawk, 1990 – 2024
- Lockheed HC-130J Combat King II, 2019 – present
- Sikorsky HH-60W Jolly Green II, 2024 – present

== See also ==
- List of Martin B-26 Marauder operators
