= Francis S. Gabreski Air National Guard Base =

Air defense military installation

- Near Westhampton Beach, New York in the United States of America
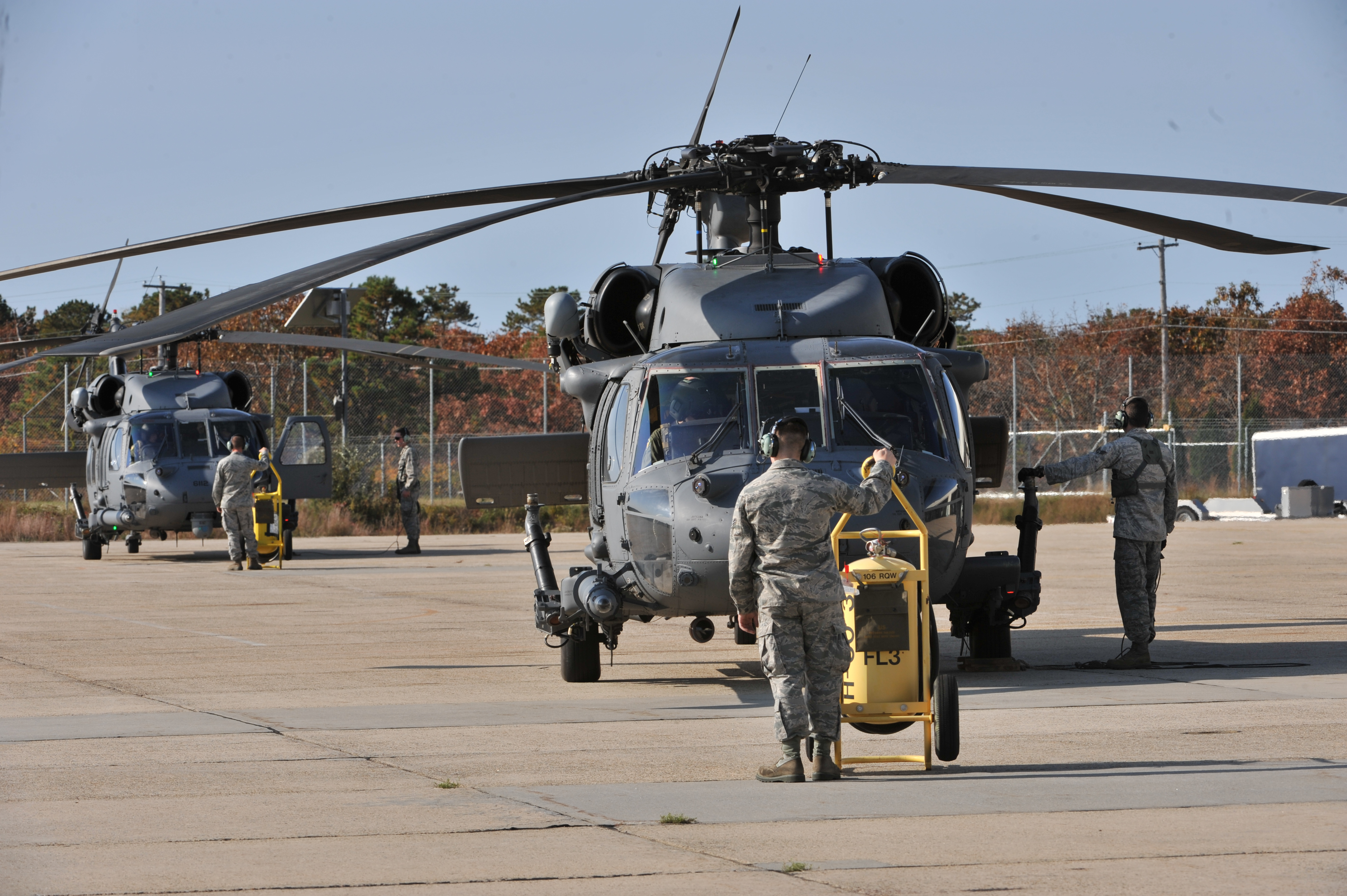
- HH-60G Pave Hawks of the 106th Rescue Wing at Francis S. Gabreski Air National Guard Base

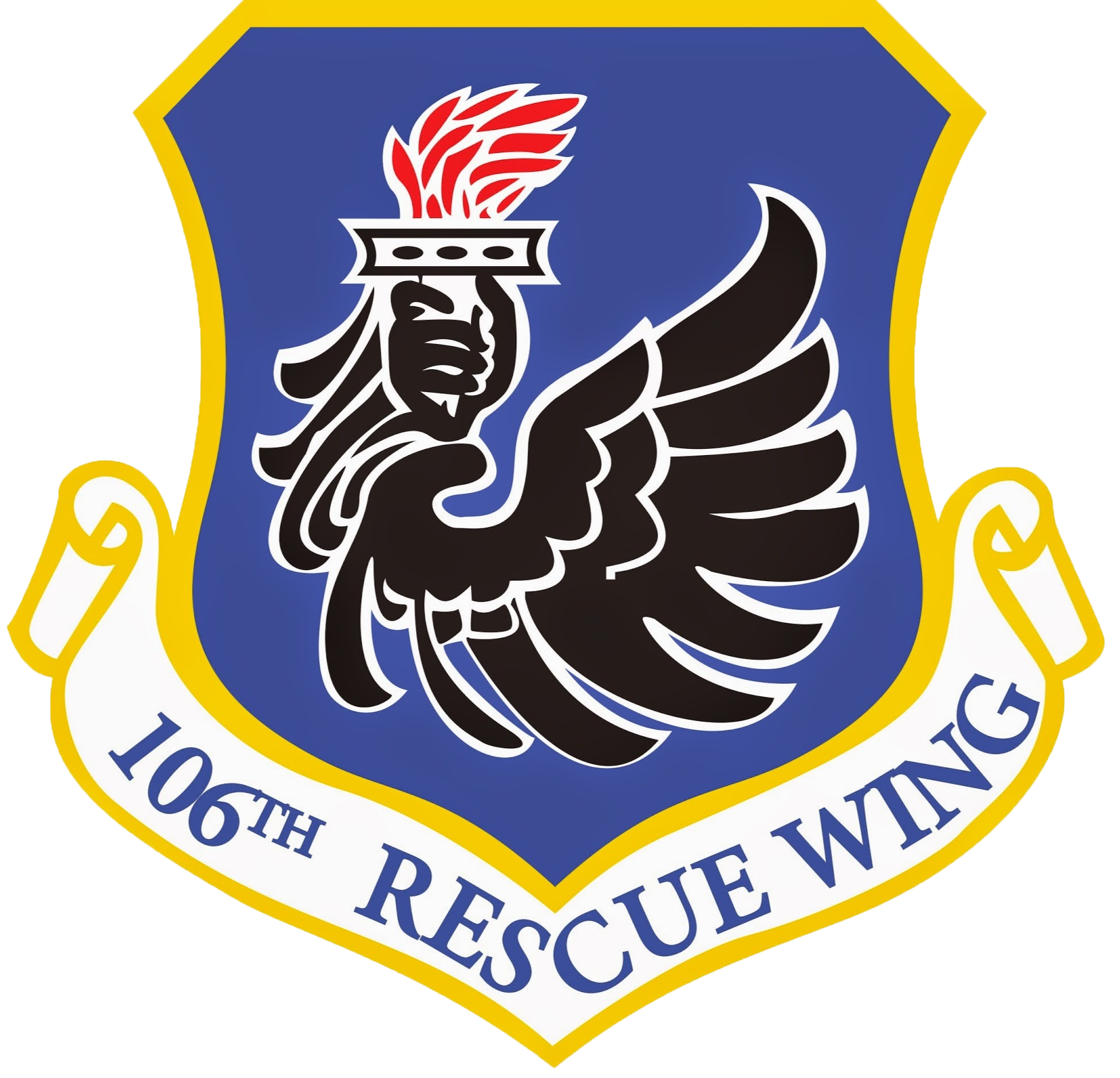

Site information
- Type: Air National Guard base
- Owner: Suffolk County
- Operator: US Air Force (USAF)
- Controlled by: New York Air National Guard
- Condition: Operational
- Website: www.106rqw.ang.af.mil

Location
- Location within New York Location within the United States Location within North America Location within North Atlantic Location within Earth
- Coordinates: 40°50′21″N 072°38′29″W

Site history
- Built: 1943 (as Suffolk County Army Air Field)
- In use: 1943 – present

Garrison information
- Current commander: Colonel Jeffrey D. Cannet
- Garrison: 106th Rescue Wing

Airfield information
- Identifiers: IATA: FOK, ICAO: KFOK, FAA LID: FOK, WMO: 744865
- Elevation: 20.1 metres (66 ft) AMSL
Runways
Direction	Length and surface
6/24	2,743.5 metres (9,001 ft) asphalt/concrete
15/33	1,524.9 metres (5,003 ft) asphalt
1/19	1,524.3 metres (5,001 ft) asphalt/concrete
- Airfield shared with Francis S. Gabreski Airport; Source: Federal Aviation Administration

Francis S. Gabreski Air National Guard Base is an air defense military installation located at civilian public-use Francis S. Gabreski Airport, located just north of Westhampton Beach, New York. It is currently the home base of the New York Air National Guard's 106th Rescue Wing.

The base is named for Colonel Francis Stanley Gabreski, an American Air Force pilot who was the top American and United States Army Air Forces fighter ace over Europe during World War II and a jet fighter ace with the Air Force in the Korean War.

== History ==
=== Suffolk County Army Air Field ===
The Suffolk County Army Air Field was built in 1943 as a United States Army Air Forces sub-base of Mitchel Field. Later assigned to First Air Force, the 437th Army Air Force Base Unit defended the New York City area and flew antisubmarine patrols. After World War II, the airfield was conveyed to Suffolk County for use as a civilian airport, but to include a reversal clause if future military use was ever needed.

=== Suffolk County Air Force Base ===
Renamed when the United States Air Force reclaimed the airport in 1951, Suffolk County Air Force Base was part of the Eastern Air Defense Force's defense of the NYC metro area. The Air National Guard's 103rd Fighter-Interceptor Wing (103 FIW), along with the 118th Fighter-Interceptor Squadron and its F-47N Thunderbolts, was federalized on March 2, 1951, and moved from Brainard Field, Connecticut, to Suffolk County AFB on June 1. The 103 FIW was returned to state control on February 6, 1952, and remained briefly at Suffolk County until replaced by the 45th and 75th Fighter-Interceptor Squadrons in November 1952, flying the F-86 Sabre as part of the 23rd Fighter-Interceptor Group (23 FIG).

In 1955, the 23 FIG was reassigned to Presque Isle Air Force Base and replaced by the newly activated 52nd Fighter-Interceptor Wing (52 FIW), which flew under various designations from Suffolk County AFB until 1969, with the 2d and 5th Fighter-Interceptor Squadrons flying F-94 Starfire, F-101 Voodoo and F-102 Delta Dagger interceptors. In 1963, the 52 FIW was renamed the 52nd Fighter Wing (Air Defense) and became part of the New York Air Defense Sector (NY ADS), the NY ADS being one of four USAF air defense sectors employing the Semi-Automatic Ground Environment (SAGE) system.

Suffolk County AFB was also the main support base for the Suffolk County Missile Annex, a nearby USAF CIM-10 Bomarc surface-to-air missile launch complex for the defense of the New York City metropolitan area under the control of a missile launch control center at McGuire Air Force Base, New Jersey.

As a result of funding shortfalls for the Vietnam War that resulted in the closure of numerous stateside air force bases and naval air stations, Suffolk County AFB deactivated in 1969 and the military installation was again transferred to the Suffolk County government for use as a civilian airport.

=== Francis S. Gabreski Air National Guard Base ===
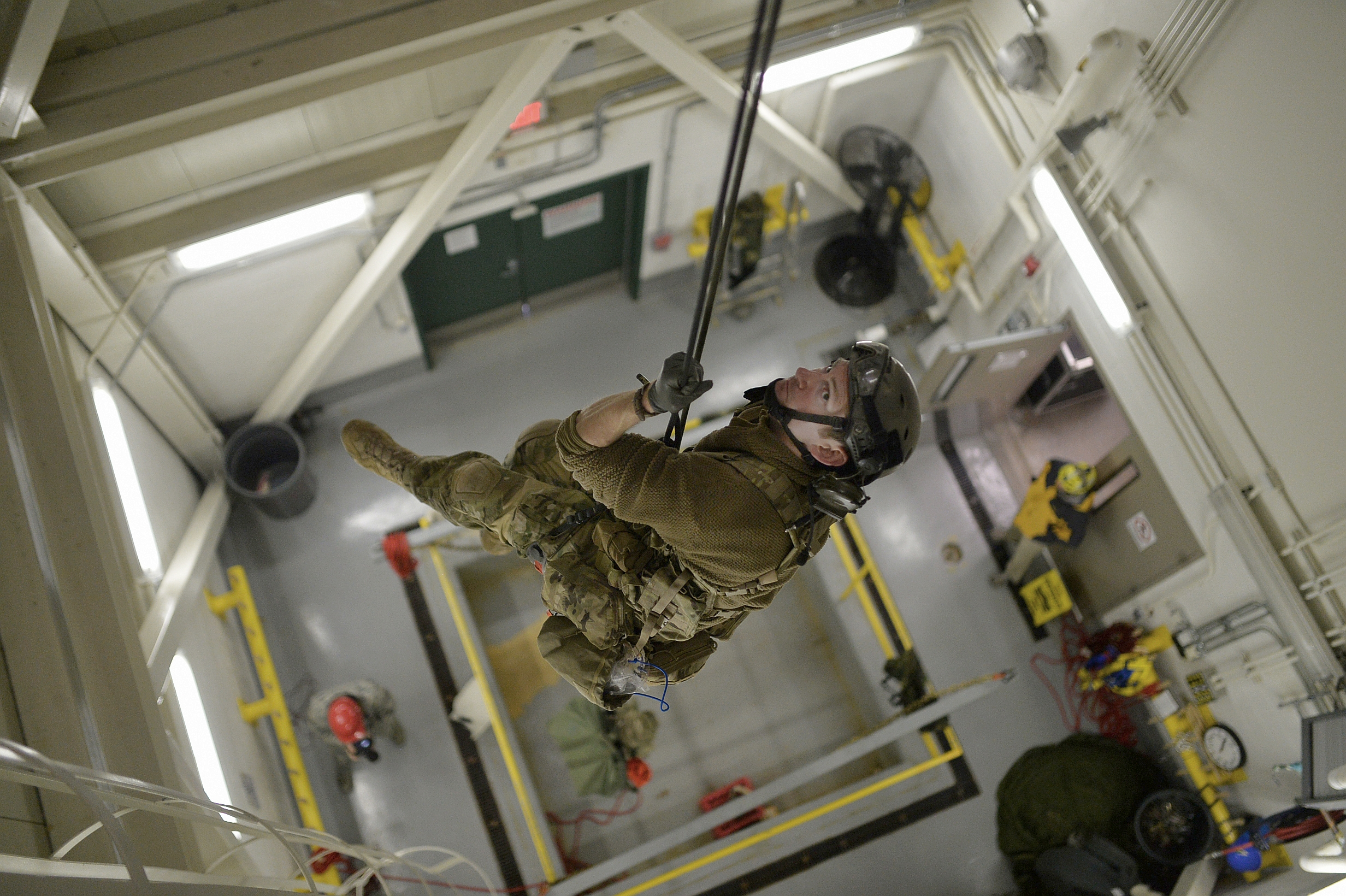
Pararescuemen from the 103d Rescue Squadron rappel from the top of a parachute drying facility to conduct confined space rescue training.

Suffolk County Airport (Francis S. Gabreski Airport after 1991) operated without a military unit until June 1970 when the 102nd Air Refueling Squadron of the New York Air National Guard relocated from Naval Air Station Floyd Bennett Field with its KC-97 Stratofreighters. In 1972, the 102d switched to F-102 Delta Daggers and became the 102d Fighter-Interceptor Squadron. In 1975, the unit had another mission change and became an Aerospace Rescue and Recovery squadron, later renamed the 102nd Rescue Squadron in 1995.

Today, the 106th Rescue Wing uses HC-130J Combat King II transport aircraft and HH-60G Pave Hawk helicopters for both peacetime and combat search and rescue.

== Based units ==
Flying and notable non-flying units based at Francis S. Gabreski Air National Guard Base.

=== United States Air Force ===
Air National Guard

- New York Air National Guard
  - 106th Rescue Wing
    - 106th Operations group
      - 101st Rescue Squadron – HH-60G Pave Hawk, HH-60W Jolly Green II
      - 102d Rescue Squadron – HC-130J Combat King II
      - 103d Rescue Squadron – Air Force Pararescuemen
      - 106th Operations Support Squadron
    - 106th Maintenance Group
      - 106th Aircraft Maintenance Squadron
      - 106th Maintenance Operations Flight
      - 106th Maintenance Squadron
    - 106th Medical Group
    - 106th Mission Support Group
      - 106th Civil Engineer Squadron
      - 106th Communications Squadron
      - 106th Logistics Readiness Squadron
      - 106th Security Forces Squadron
      - 106th Force Support Squadron

== In popular culture ==
The book The Perfect Storm and the film by the same name detail the crash of one of the 106th's HH-60G Pave Hawk rescue helicopters while conducting civilian search and rescue operations from the airport during the 1991 Perfect Storm.
