= 101st Rescue Squadron =

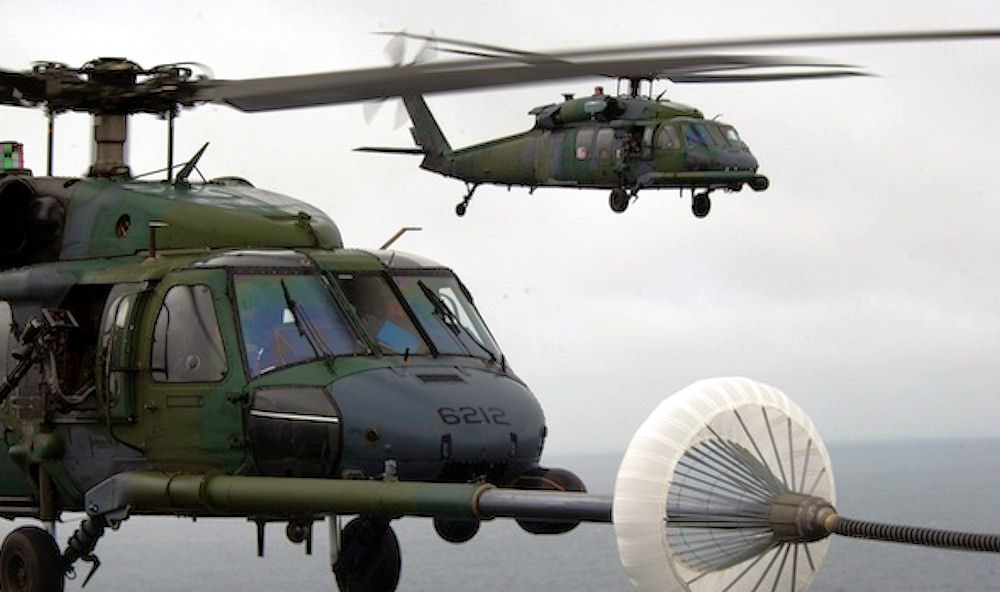
- 101st Rescue Squadron – HH-60G Pavehawk helicopters refueling in air
- Active: 2004–Present
- Country: United States
- Allegiance: New York
- Branch: Air National Guard
- Type: Combat Search & Rescue Specialists
- Role: Combat Search & Rescue, Special Forces Rescue
- Part of: New York Air National Guard, 106th Rescue Wing
- Garrison/HQ: Francis S. Gabreski Air National Guard Base, Westhampton Beach, New York
- Motto: Servare vitam (To save lives)

Insignia
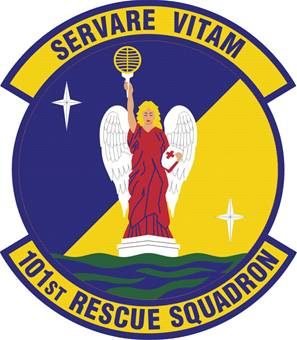
- 101st Rescue Squadron emblem

Aircraft flown
- Helicopter: HH-60W Jolly Green II

The 101st Rescue Squadron (101 RQS) is a unit of the New York Air National Guard 106th Rescue Wing stationed at Francis S. Gabreski Air National Guard Base, Westhampton Beach, New York. The squadron is equipped with HH-60W Jolly Green II helicopters, configured for combat search and rescue operations.

== Overview ==
Established in 2004 by the Air Force Special Operations Command as part of a re-organization of Air National Guard rescue wings which created separate squadrons for fixed-wing, helicopter and pararescue elements of the 106th Rescue Wing. Subsequently reverted to Air Combat Command.

The squadron maintains, supports and operates the HH-60W Jolly Green II helicopters of the 106th Rescue Wing. It is an integral component of the 106th Operations Group, along with the Lockheed HC-130J Combat King II search and rescue/aerial refueling aircraft of the 102d Rescue Squadron, transporting pararescue personnel of the 103d RQS in their mission.

=== History ===
For the history of the squadron prior to 2004, see 102nd Rescue Squadron.

== Equipment ==
- Sikorsky HH-60G Pave Hawk (2004 - 2024)
- Sikorsky HH-60W Jolly Green II (June 2024 - )
