= 137th Airlift Squadron =

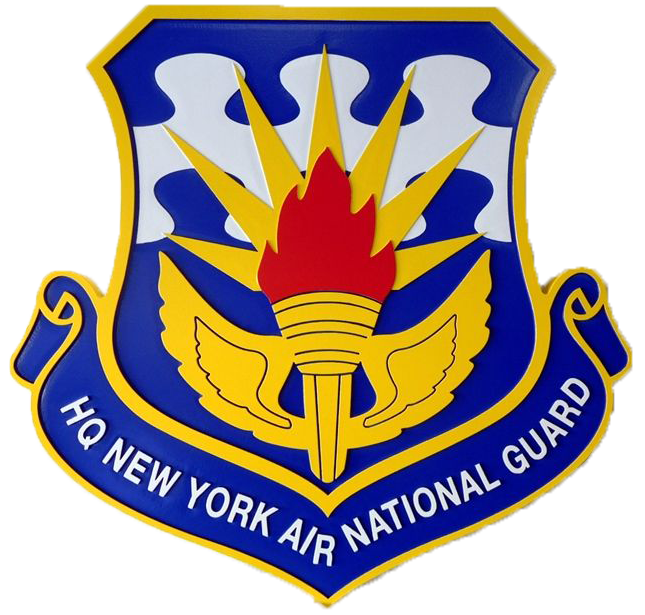
137th Airlift Squadron

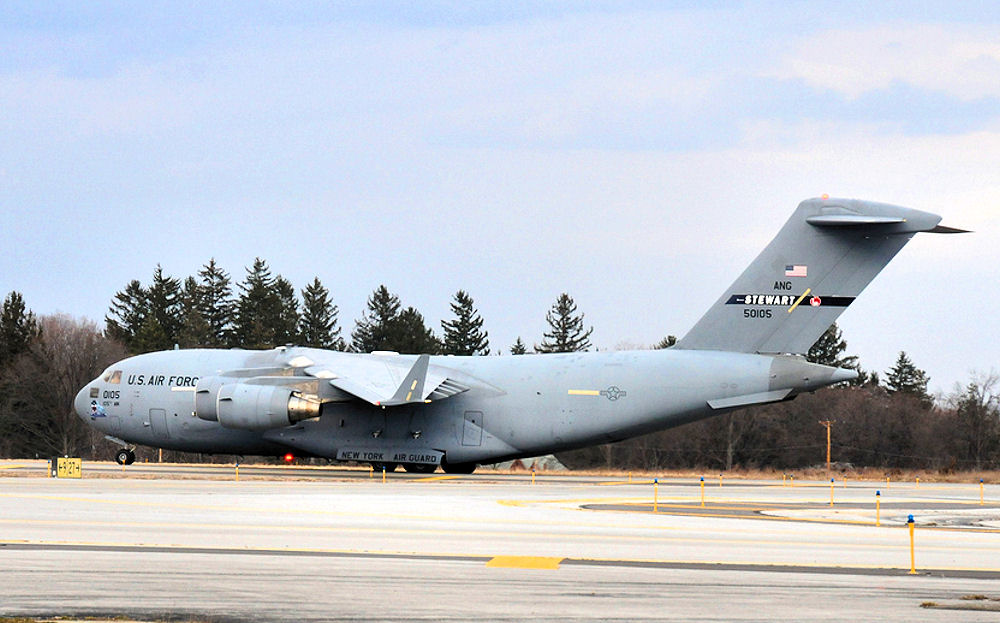
- Squadron C-17A Globemaster III at Stewart ANGB
- Active: 1942–1945; 1948–1961; 1961–1969; 1969–present
- Country: United States
- Allegiance: New York
- Branch: Air National Guard
- Type: Squadron
- Role: Airlift
- Part of: New York Air National Guard
- Garrison/HQ: Stewart Air National Guard Base, New York
- Decorations: Distinguished Unit Citation; Air Force Meritorious Unit Award; Air Force Outstanding Unit Award

Insignia
- 137th Airlift Squadron emblem

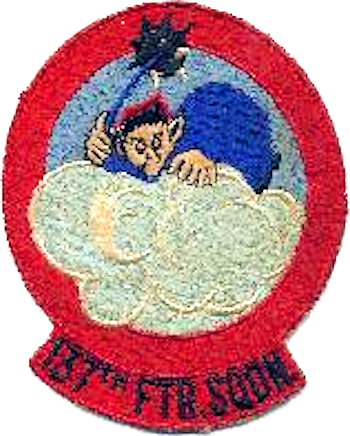
- 137th Fighter-Interceptor Squadron emblem

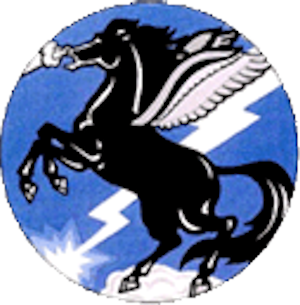
- 504th Fighter Squadron emblem

- Tail stripe
- World War II Fuselage code: 5Q

The 137th Airlift Squadron is a unit of the New York Air National Guard 105th Airlift Wing located at Stewart Air National Guard Base, Newburgh, New York. It was first activated during World War II as the 483rd Bombardment Squadron. After converting to fighter aircraft as the 504th Fighter-Bomber Squadron, the squadron deployed to the European Theater of Operations, where it participated in combat, earning a Distinguished Unit Citation and destroying 52 enemy aircraft in air to air combat. Following V-E Day, it returned to the United States, where it was inactivated in November 1945.

In 1946, it was allotted to the National Guard and in 1948 was activated in the New York Air National Guard as the 137th Fighter Squadron it continued in the fighter role until 1961, when the 137th Tactical Fighter Squadron was replaced by the 137th Aeromedical Transport Squadron. It flew transport and aeromedical evacuation missions until 1969, when the 137th Military Airlift Squadron was replaced by the 137th Tactical Air Support Squadron which trained as a forward air control unit until 1983, when it moved from Westchester County Airport to Stewart and resumed the airlift mission.

== Mission ==
The squadron operates the Boeing C-17 Globemaster III strategic airlift cargo plane from Stewart Air National Guard Base. The squadron's airmen regularly fly missions providing support to U.S. forces worldwide. Squadron members also deploy as members of air expeditionary wings into operational areas throughout the world. As members of the New York Air National Guard, airmen of the squadron respond to state emergencies when called upon by the Governor of New York.

== History ==
=== World War II ===
==== Organization and training ====
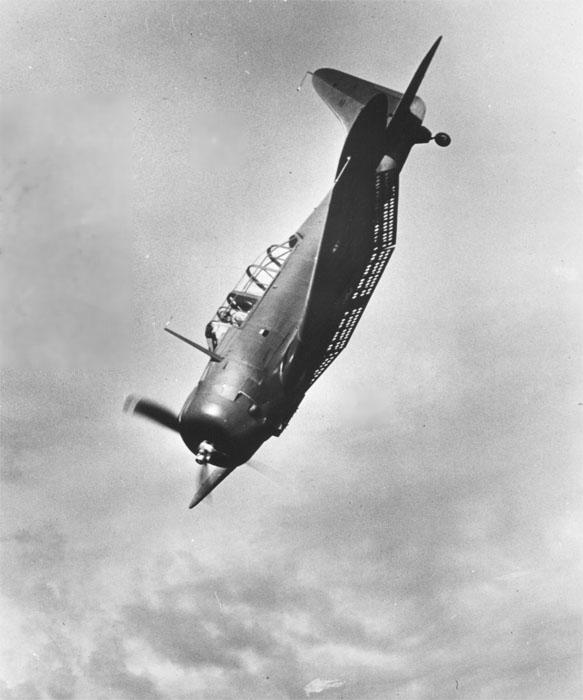
A-24, first plane flown by the squadron

The first predecessor of the squadron was formed in August 1942 as the 483rd Bombardment Squadron at Hunter Field, Georgia, as one of the original four squadrons of the 339th Bombardment Group. It was equipped with Douglas A-24 Banshee dive bombers, and also flew a few Curtiss A-25 Shrikes. In July 1943, it moved to Walterboro Army Air Field, South Carolina, where it re-equipped with Bell P-39 Airacobras. The following month, along with all other single engine bomber units of the Army Air Forces (AAF), it was redesignated as a fighter-bomber unit, becoming the 504th Fighter-Bomber Squadron. It moved to Rice Army Air Field, California in September 1943, where in addition to training with its P-39s, it participated in maneuvers. It departed Rice for the European Theater of Operations on 9 March 1944, sailing from the New York Port of Embarkation on the MV Stirling Castle on 22 March.

==== Combat in the European Theater ====
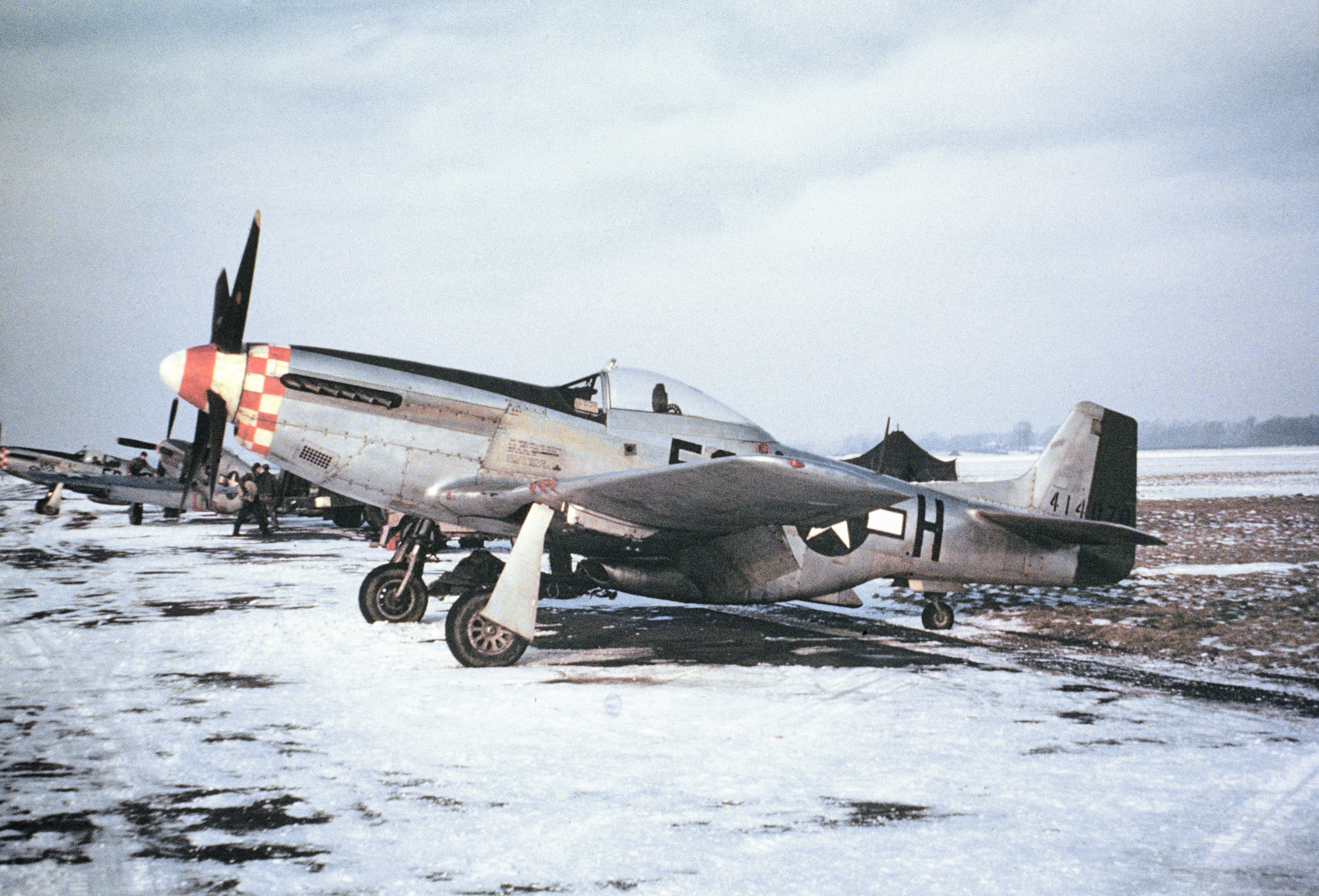
Squadron P-51D Mustang at RAF Bassingbourn (Note: Aircraft is North American P-51D-10-NA Mustang, serial 44-14070, 5Q-H. Photo taken in January 1945.)

The squadron landed in England on 4 April and arrived at its combat station, RAF Fowlmere, the next day. Its first airplane arrived on 12 April, a North American P-51B Mustang. It quickly converted to the new fighter, and flew its first combat mission, a fighter sweep, on 30 April. In May, it dropped the "Bomber" from its name, becoming the 504th Fighter Squadron. It flew escort for Boeing B-17 Flying Fortress and Consolidated B-24 Liberator heavy bombers during its first five weeks of operations, and afterwards flew escort missions to cover operations of medium and heavy bombers that struck strategic objectives, interdicted enemy lines of communication, and provided air support for ground forces. In June 1954, it began to receive updated P-51D models of the Mustang. The 339th Group was also the first VII Fighter Command unit to be equipped with g-suits, which enabled its fighters to make tighter turns in dogfights.

On D-Day It provided fighter cover over the English Channel and the coast of Normandy for the landing forces. It strafed and dive bombed vehicles, locomotives, marshaling yards, flak batteries, and troops while Allied forces fought to break out of the beachhead in France. It attacked transportation targets during Operation Cobra, the July breakout at Saint Lo, and the subsequent Allied drive across France. It flew area patrols during Operation Market-Garden, the airborne landings attempting to secure a bridgehead across the Rhine in the Netherlands in September.

The squadron frequently strafed airfields and other targets of opportunity while on escort missions. (Note: These were named "Jackpot" missions, with fighters assigned a specific area to strafe. Freeman, p. 159.) It was awarded the Distinguished Unit Citation for its actions on escort missions on 10 and 11 September 1944. On the first day, after escorting bombers attacking a target in Germany, it attacked Erding Airfield, destroying or damaging enemy aircraft despite intense fire from antiaircraft guns and small arms. The following day it escorted a formation of bombers attacking Munich that was attacked by enemy interceptor aircraft, in the strongest defense put up by Luftflotte Reich since May. The squadron shot down fifteen enemy fighters and drove off the remaining attacking aircraft, while other elements attacked an airfield near Karlsruhe, encountering heavy fire, but damaging or destroying numerous aircraft parked on the field. (Note: The 339th Group was the only group in VIII Fighter Command to destroy more than 100 aircraft on the ground on two occasions. Both were in April 1945. Freeman, p. 249.)

The squadron escorted bombers to, and flew patrols over the battle area during the Battle of the Bulge, the German counterattack in the Ardennes in December 1944 through early January 1945. In March 1945 it supported Operation Varsity, the assault across the Rhine in Germany, patrolling the area to prevent German air attacks. It flew its last combat mission on 21 April 1945. The squadron was credited with 52 air to air victories during its year in combat.

In August and September 1945, the squadron transferred its planes to depots and many of its personnel were reassigned. The remaining squadron members left the theater in September, preceding the remainder of the 339th Group, which sailed on the RMS Queen Mary in October. It was briefly stationed at Drew Field once again before inactivating on 7 November 1945.

=== New York Air National Guard ===
==== Fighter operations ====
The 504th Squadron was redesignated the 137th Fighter Squadron and was allotted to the National Guard on 24 May 1946. It was organized at Westchester County Airport, White Plains, New York, and was extended federal recognition on 24 June 1948. The squadron was equipped with Republic F-47D Thunderbolts and was assigned to the 107th Fighter Group at Niagara Falls Municipal Airport, when the group was organized in December. The mission of the 137th Fighter Squadron was to train and equip to be capable of immediate mobilization to perform its Federal mission and to function efficiently when called on by the State of New York to preserve peace, order and public safety..

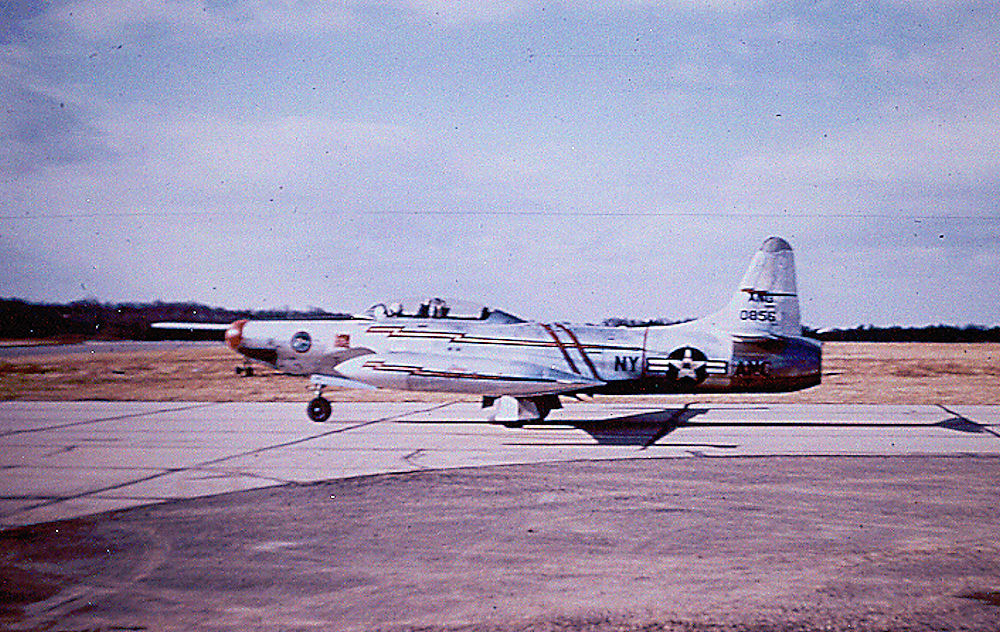
137th Fighter-Interceptor Squadron F-94B (Note: Aircraft is Lockheed F-94B-1-LO Starfire, serial 50-856.)

Although most Air National Guard units were called to active duty for the Korean War, the 137th retained the air defense mission. In 1951, its Thunderbolts were replaced by F-51H Mustangs, capable of extended flights over all of New York State. In November of 1951, Eastern Air Defense Force implemented a plan under which a "scramble line" was installed to the squadron that would permit the squadron to be mobilized and ordered into combat within four hours. The following year, the squadron became the 137th Fighter-Interceptor Squadron without a change in mission.

In 1954, the Mustang was ending its service life and Air Defense Command (ADC) was re-equipping its fighter-interceptor squadrons with jet aircraft. The 137th received Lockheed F-94B Starfires, however the F-94 required a two-man aircrew a pilot and an observer to operate its radar equipment. The additional recruitment of guardsmen led to the units having a manning and capabilities problem. It was not until 1955 that a regular flow of graduates from the radar observer school began. (Note: This did not solve the problem, which persisted until the squadron converted to single seat F-86Hs in 1957. Adjutant General Report 1957, p. 97.) In October 1954, the squadron began augmenting the Regular Air Force, maintaining a Starfire on alert from dawn to dusk daily.

In 1956, the 107th Fighter-Interceptor Wing was reorganized and redesignated the 107th Air Defense Wing. In this reorganization, the 105th Fighter Group was established as the 137th's new headquarters. The group included the 137th as the group's operational squadron and included units to support the 137th (Note: These were the 105th Materiel Squadron, 105th Air Base Squadron, and the 105th USAF Dispensary.) The North American F-86H Sabre replaced the F-94B Starfires in 1957.

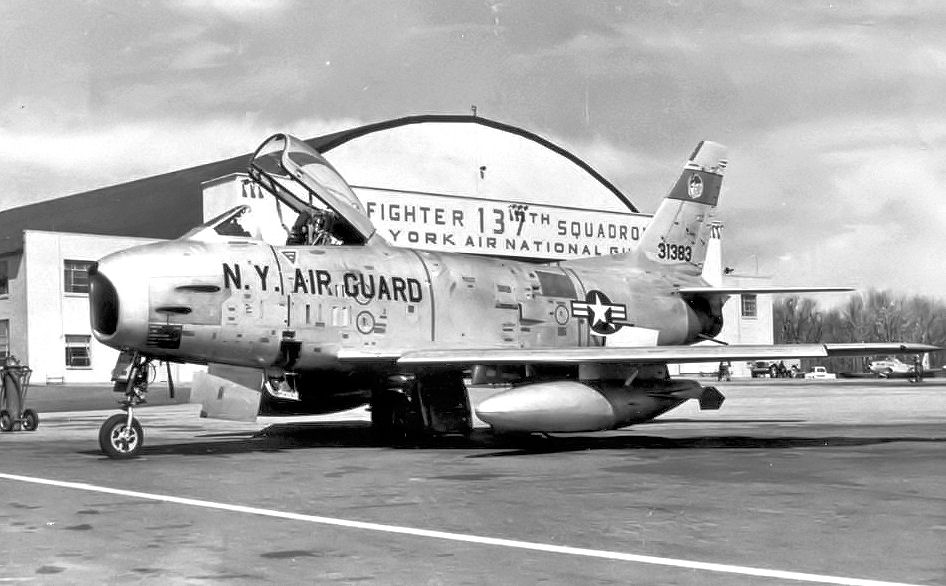
137th Tactical Fighter Squadron F-86H (Note: Aircraft is North American F-86H-10-NH Sabre, serial 53-1383. This aircraft was converted to a QF-86H target drone and loaned to the Navy. It was expended at Naval Air Weapons Station China Lake, California on 6 August 1980. Its nose was recovered and is on display at the Planes of Fame Museum. Baugher, Joe (5 August 2023). "1953 USAF Serial Numbers". Joe Baugher.)

In 1958, the squadron became the 137th Tactical Fighter Squadron and changed from its ADC mission to being gained by Tactical Air Command (TAC) . The new assignment involved a change in the group's training mission to include high-altitude interception, air-to-ground rocketry, ground strafing and tactical bombing. It also won the Governor's Air Trophy as the best tactical unit in the state.

==== Airlift operations ====
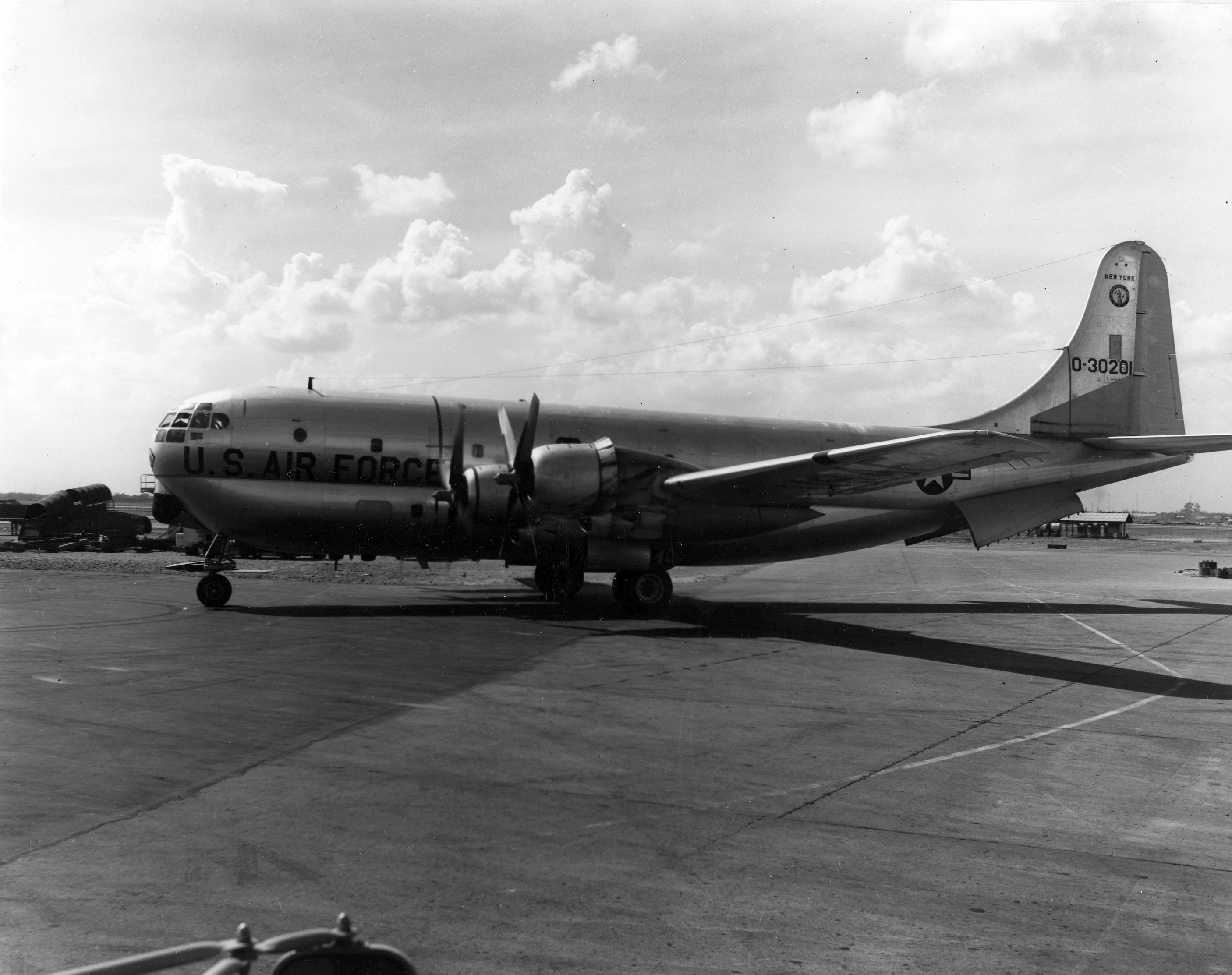
New York Air National Guard C-97G Stratofreighter on the ramp at Tan Son Nhut Airport, Vietnam in March 1966

The 105th Tactical Fighter Group was inactivated on 1 February 1961 with the 137th being redesignated the 137th Aeromedical Transport Squadron and transferred to the 106th Aeromedical Transport Group as Military Air Transport Service (MATS) became its wartime gaining command. The 137th converted to flying the Fairchild C-119 Flying Boxcar. The squadron airlifted critically injured and sick personnel until late 1963.

With air transportation recognized as a critical need, the squadron was redesignated the 137th Air Transport Squadron , Heavy on 1 December 1963 and equipped with Boeing C-97 Stratofreighter heavy transports, although the aeromedical flight remained as a secondary mission. With the mission change, the squadron returned to the control of the 105th Air Transport Group. With the C-97s, the 137th augmented MATS airlift capability worldwide in support of the Air Force's needs, flying missions weekly. In the spring of 1964, it airlifted men and materiel to and from the maneuver areas for Operation Desert Strike, which was the second largest military exercise since World War II, involving over 100,000 service members. The squadron also airlifted members of the National Guard to and from their annual training sites, which previously had to be done by ground transport or commercial air. It also flew scheduled MATS transport missions to Europe, Africa, the Caribbean, and South America. On 1 January 1966, MATS became Military Airlift Command (MAC) and the 137th was redesignated as the 137th Military Airlift Squadron.

In 1966, the squadron began operations to and from bases in South Vietnam. During calendar year 1967, in addition to the Southeast Asia flights which continued throughout the year until September, the squadron flew missions to South America, Africa, Australia, Asia and Europe in support of MAC and the Joint Chiefs of Staff airlift (directed) missions. The overseas flights also were in addition to a variety of airlift missions flown within the continental United States to include Alaska, Hawaii and Puerto Rico carrying personnel of the active military, Reserve and National Guard units to and from training sites and a continuing series of joint exercises.

==== Tactical air control operations ====
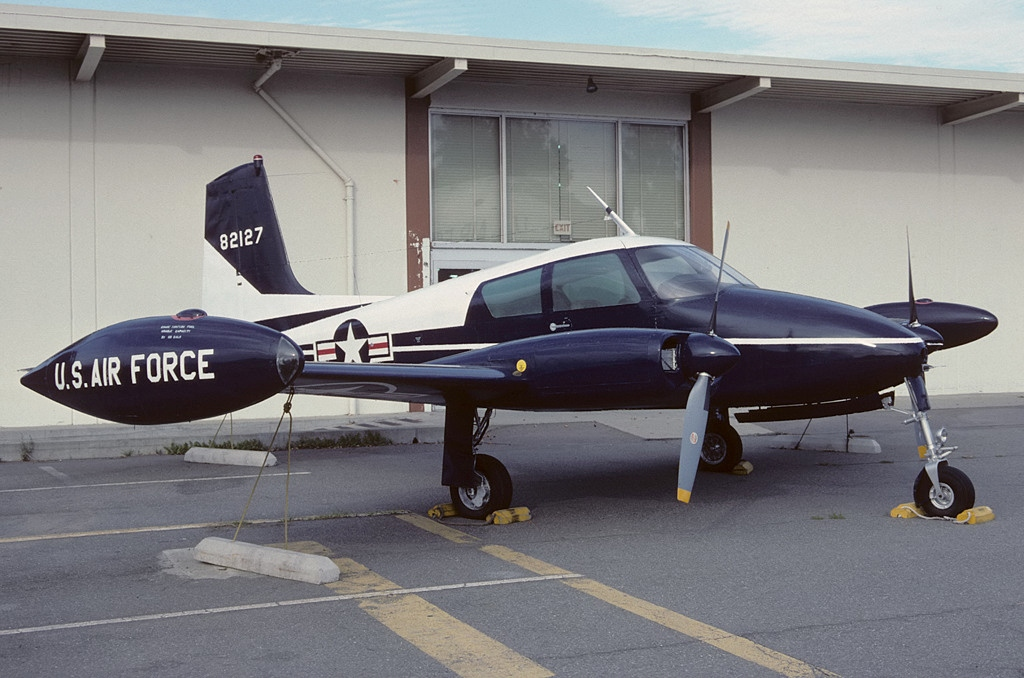
U-3A Blue Canoe as flown by the squadron

In 1969 the C-97s were reaching the end of their operational lifetime and in March, the 105th became the 105th Tactical Air Support Group and was again gained by TAC. The 137th Tactical Air Support Squadron received interim Cessna U-3 Blue Canoe aircraft direct from Cessna, which were soon replaced with the Cessna O-2A Super Skymaster . The O-2 was a military development of the Cessna 337 Skymaster, a high wing, twin boom aircraft with a unique centerline pusher/tractor twin engine configuration. The O-2A version, used by the 137th TASS, was used in forward air control (FAC) missions, often in conjunction with a ground FAC and ROMAD (radio operator, maintenance, and driver), team.

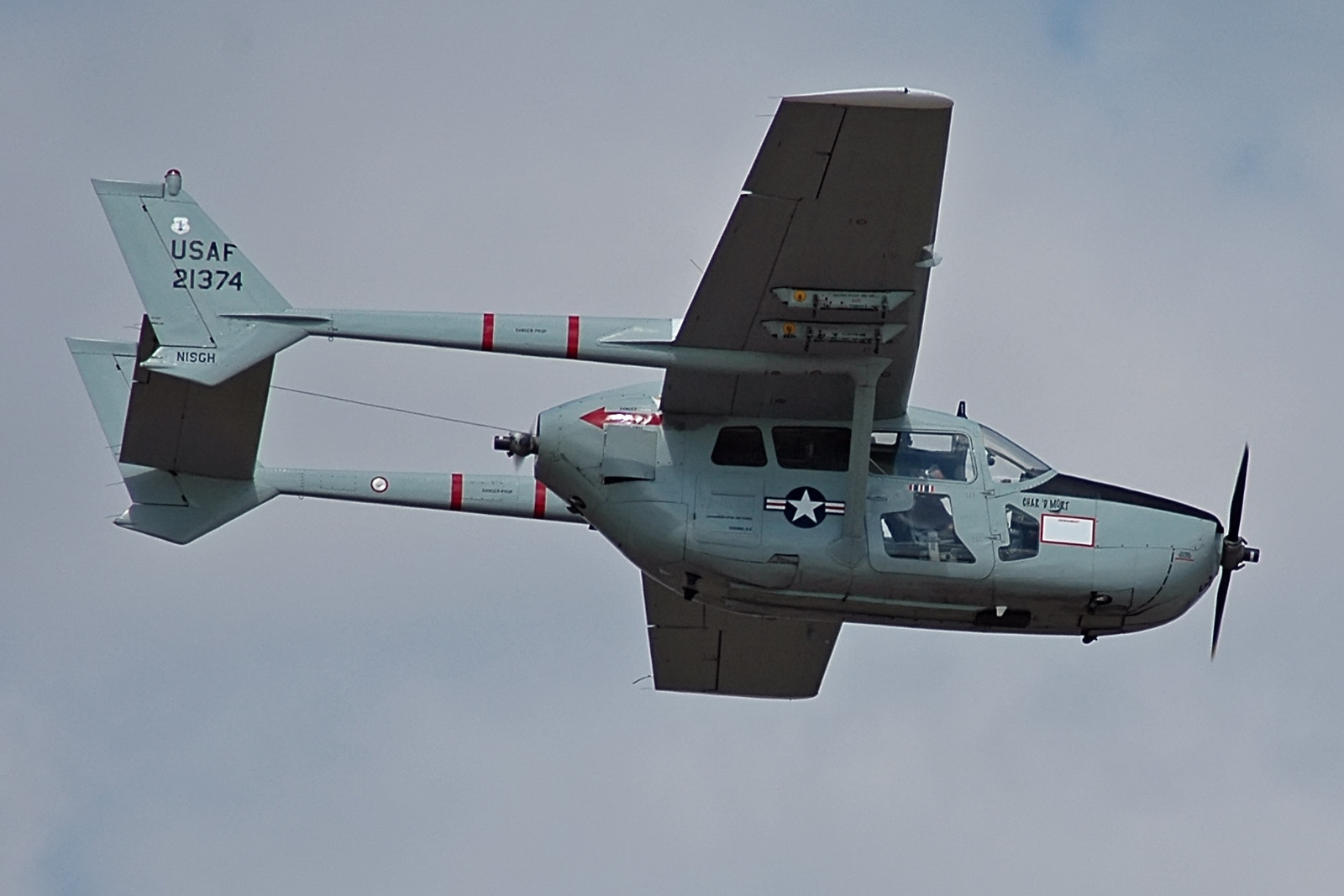
O-2 Skymaster of an Air National Guard unit

The squadron mission was to train forward air controllers and to maintain proficiency in the unit aircraft. An unusual call to active duty on took place from 24 to 26 March for the New York City postal strike. The 105th Group performed postal duties at the Main Bronx Post Office, Westchester County Airport. During 1970, President Nixon, the Presidents of France, Ecuador, and several other foreign notables landed at Westchester County Airport.

As part of the drawdown of forces in Southeast Asia, aircraft from the Vietnam War were added to make up the allocated number to the squadron. The squadron assisted local governmental health agencies in detecting violations of water and stream pollution laws. 105th pilots, on the kind of observation missions they would fly in combat, flew program of photographing and reporting to local officials. The local health agency would then send its own aircraft to take similar photographs for evidence and possible action. The 105th was awarded the Governor's Trophy for 1974, signifying the outstanding flying unit of the New York Air National Guard for that year.

The 105th Tactical Air Support Wing was activated on 14 June 1975, and the 105th Group became the operational organization for the new wing. In August 1978 the group was inactivated and the 137th was assigned directly to the wing. However, the unit reverted to group status on 1 July 1979. In 1978, the squadron participated in Exercise Empire Glacier at Fort Drum, a cold weather exercise. Previous winter exercises had been held in Alaska, but northern New York was selected for this exercise not only for the snow cover, but for the similarity of its terrain and climate to northern Europe.

In 1979, the unit received the Air Force Outstanding Unit Award. After becoming a part of TAC, the unit received the New York State Governor's Trophy, as the State's outstanding flying unit, more than one half of the years.

In the early 1980s, it became apparent that the facility at Westchester Airport was not large enough to support a conversion to a new aircraft or mission. The State's Division of Military and Naval Affairs started negotiations with National Guard Bureau to relocate the unit. As a result, USAF and the Air National Guard approved a unit relocation to Stewart International Airport, Newburgh, New York. This move took advantage of the excellent airfield facilities at Stewart, which was an active Air Force Base through 1969. The move, initiated during 1982 was completed by the last quarter of 1983.

==== Return to airlift mission ====
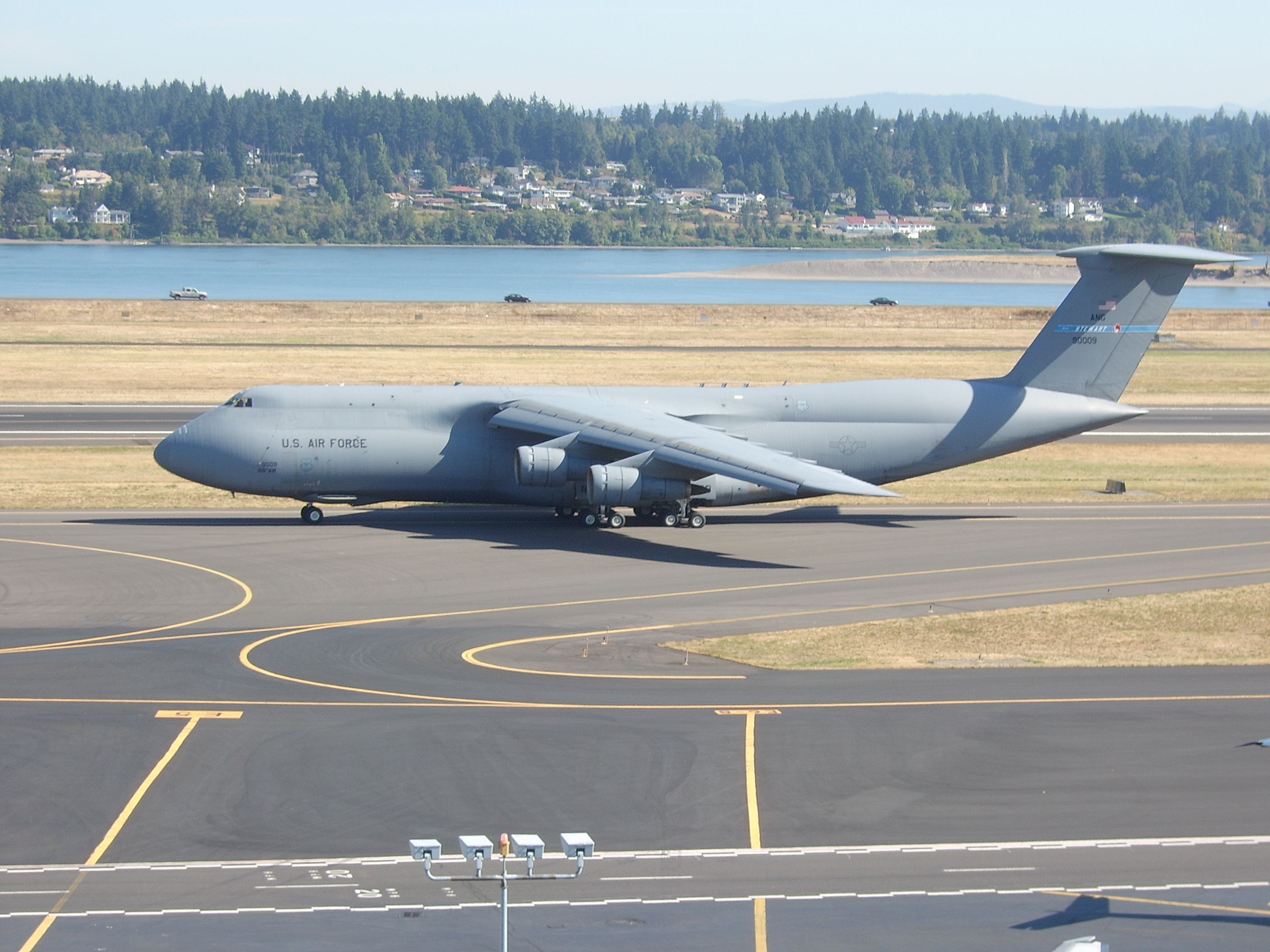
Squadron C-5A Galaxy at Portland International Airport

In May 1983, the unit relocated to Stewart International Airport. It was redesignated the 105th Military Airlift Group on 1 May 1984 and later in July 1985 became the first Air National Guard unit in the Nation to fly the Lockheed C-5A Galaxy aircraft. (Note: Ironically, the squadron went from flying the O-2, the Air Force's smallest aircraft to flying the C-5, the Air Force's largest aircraft. 1985 Annual Report, p. 36.) Soon after receiving its first C-5A aircraft, in October 1985 the unit airlifted cots and bedding to Puerto Rico following Hurricane Gloria.

The squadron's C-5s were first tapped for humanitarian relief, when it flew emergency supplies to Puerto Rico in October 1985, following Hurricane Isabel. In October 1988 the 137th airlifted supplies to Jamaica following Hurricane Gilbert. In October 1989 the unit airlifted relief supplies to Puerto Rico and the Virgin Islands following Hurricane Hugo. In September 1992 the unit responded to Hurricane Andrew, delivering food, tents, mobile kitchens, vehicles, and emergency services personnel to Homestead , Florida. Immediately following Hurricane Marilyn in September 1995, the unit airlifted 527,200 pounds of desperately needed supplies and equipment to the citizens of the American Virgin Islands.

In addition to hurricane relief the squadron flew other humanitarian missions. In January 1989, it carried earthquake relief supplies to aid Armenia. In March 1989 the 105th responded with less than 24 hours notice to an MAC request to airlift a submersible vehicle from Andrews Air Force Base, Maryland and Homestead Air Force Base, Florida to Kadena Air Base, Japan to assist in search and recovery operations for an Air Force Sikorsky SH-3 Sea King helicopter which crashed in the East China Sea. Throughout the summer and fall of 1989 the 137th continued to support reconstruction efforts in Jamaica by airlifting National Guard civil engineering teams and equipment to that island nation. In December 1991, the 105th airlifted clothing, blankets and medical supplies to Bucharest, Romania. In February 1992 the unit participated in Operation Provide Hope, the airlift of humanitarian aid to the Commonwealth of Independent States (former Soviet Union), delivering relief materials to Saint Petersburg, Russia and Yerevan, Armenia.

In 1989, the squadron performed its wartime mission in support of Operation Just Cause, the invasion of Panama to replace Manuel Noriega. The cargo airlifted by the 105th in support of that operation was approximately 25% of the initial total airlift effort of all of MAC's C-5 fleet from both active duty and reserve component elements.

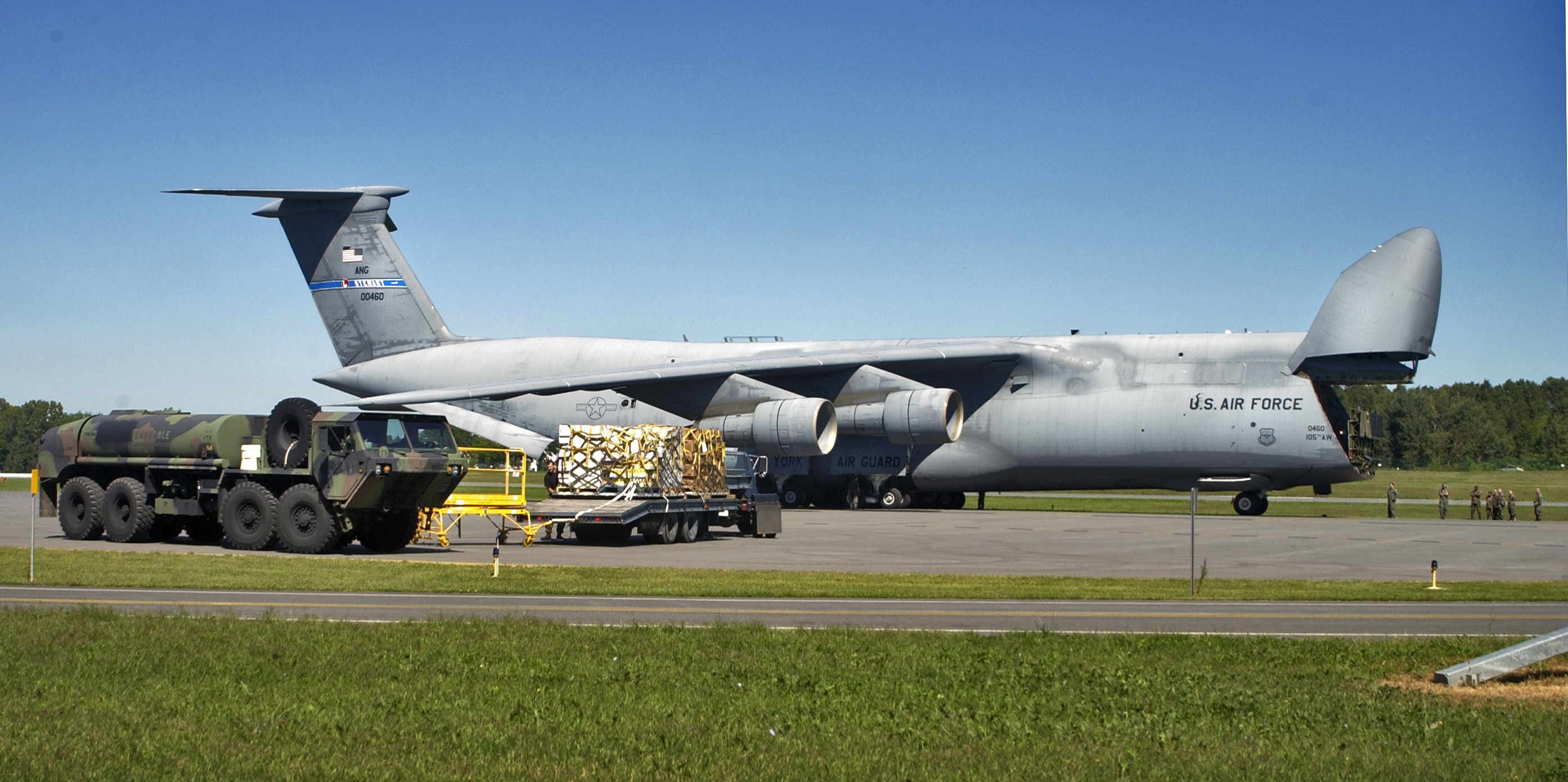
Squadron C-5A Galaxy supporting Hurricane Katrina relief operations (Note: Aircraft is Lockheed C-5A Galaxy, serial 70-0460, Hudson Valley Hauler on the flightline at Albany International Airport before cargo is loaded bound for Gulfport, Mississippi. This was the only C-5A modified with the Advanced Delivery System for Impact Resistant Materiel, which allowed for high altitude drops of equipment. It was the last C-5A transferred to the reserve and was programmed for transfer to the National Museum of the United States Air Force for loan to the Pima Air Museum. Baugher, Joe (9 July 2023). "1970 USAF Serial Numbers". Joe Baugher.)

On 7 August 1990 Governor Mario Cuomo announced that the Department of Defense had requested, and he had approved, the participation of the personnel and C-5A aircraft of the 137th in support of Operation Desert Shield in the Persian Gulf region. On 24 August the squadron was called to active duty by President George H. W. Bush to provide support for this operation. While the 137th was formally returned to state control on 15 May 1991, the majority of unit members chose to remain in active status until 1 August 1991 in response to MAC's need for continuing airlift support of Operation Desert Storm and Operation Provide Comfort (Kurdish relief).

In March 1992, the unit was redesignated the 137th Airlift Squadron. On 1 October 1995, the 105th adopted the Air Force Objective Wing organization plan, the 105th Airlift Group became a wing and the 137th Airlift Squadron was assigned to the new 105th Operations Group.

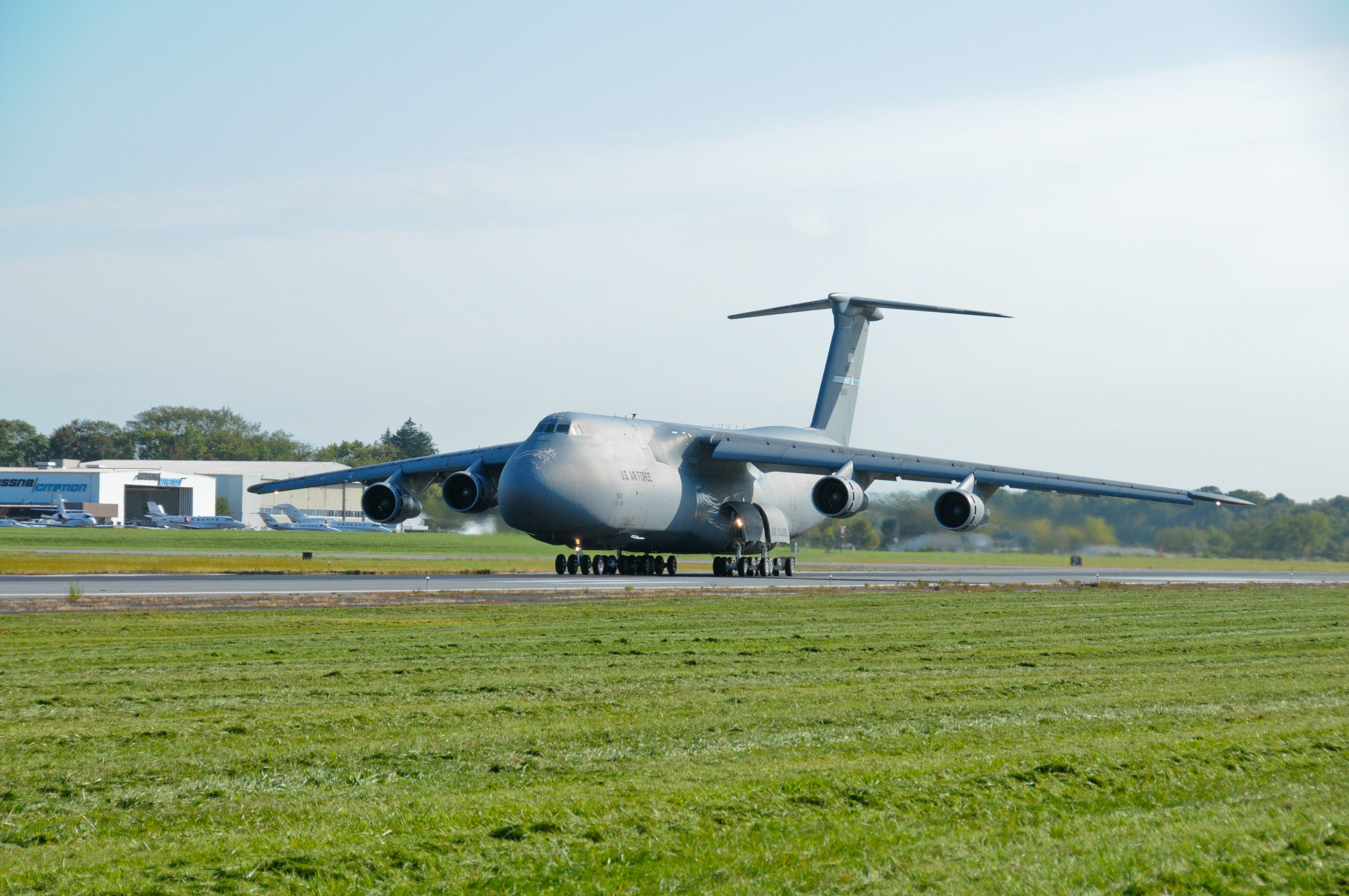
The last squadron C-5A Galaxy leaving Stewart for the last time (Note: Aircraft is Lockheed C-5A Galaxy, serial 69-0001. Photo taken on 19 September 2012. Airplane transferred to the Aerospace Maintenance and Regeneration Center on 21 September 2012. Baugher, Joe (10 June 2023). "1969 USAF Serial Numbers". Joe Baugher.)

In November 1992 the 105th airlifted generators, portable shelters and medical supplies and equipment to Zagreb, Croatia to support the U.S. Army's establishment of a facility to provide health care for United Nations forces deployed in Croatia and Bosnia-Herzegovina. From December 1992 to April 1993 the 105th supported Operation Restore Hope providing humanitarian airlift of supplies and over 600 passengers into Somalia. Following massive flooding in the central United States in July 1993, the unit airlifted ten reverse osmosis water purification systems capable of providing over 600,000 gallons of potable water a day to Des Moines, Iowa. In August 1993 the unit airlifted relief supplies and equipment to Southern Turkey to be used to help Kurdish refugees from Iraqi terrorism.

In October 1993 the 105th returned to Somalia, delivering military personnel and equipment non-stop with triple air refueling directly from bases in the United States to Mogadishu. In July 1994 105th aircraft began carrying humanitarian relief supplies to the people of Rwanda. In late September 1994 the unit began airlifting supplies and equipment to Haiti as part of Operation Uphold Democracy. The 105th played a key role in July 1995 for Operation Quick Lift when it airlifted cargo and British troops from RAF Brize Norton, UK to Split, Croatia in support of the United Nations' Rapid Reaction Deployment Force.

In October 1994 squadron aircraft and volunteer crews played a key role in Operation Vigilant Warrior and Operation Southern Watch deterring potential Iraqi aggression in the Arabian Peninsula. In August 1995 the 105th airlifted personnel and equipment to Kuwait to support Vigilant Warrior II and Exercise Intrinsic Action. In December 1995, 105th Airlift Wing C-5 crews embarked on the first of six missions in support of President Bill Clinton's peacekeeping mission in Bosnia, transporting U.S. Army support equipment to the European theater. The 105th returned to Rwanda in March 1996 to deliver vital supplies and equipment in support of the International Criminal Tribunal for Rwanda and the World Food Programme.

In mid-1996, the Air Force, in response to budget cuts and changing world situations, began experimenting with air expeditionary organizations. The Air Expeditionary Force (AEF) concept was developed that would mix active duty, reserve and Air National Guard elements into a combined force. Instead of entire permanent units deploying as provisional units as in the 1991 Gulf War, expeditionary units are composed of "aviation packages" from several wings would be married together to carry out the assigned deployment rotation. Since 1996, when the squadron is the major force provider for an expeditionary unit, the 137th Expeditionary Airlift Squadron is formed. It has deployed in support contingencies including Operation Joint Endeavor, Operation Allied Force, and Operation Joint Guardian. After the 9/11 terrorist attacks in 2001, the 137th Expeditionary Airlift Squadron was formed support Operation Northern Watch, Operation Enduring Freedom and Operation Iraqi Freedom.

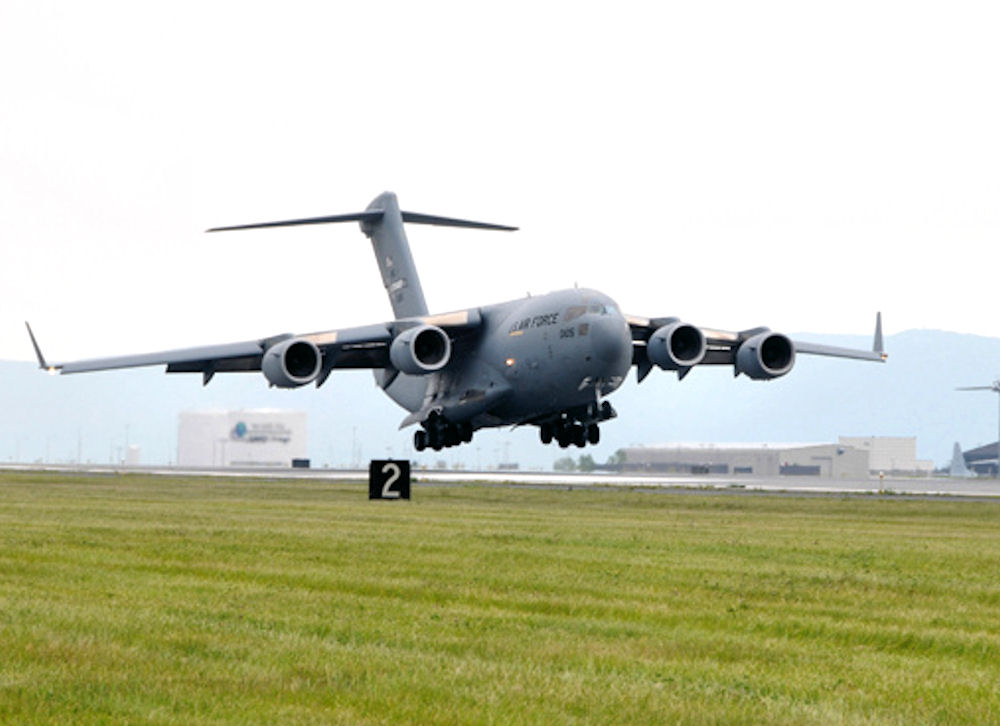
The first C-17 assigned to the 105th Airlift Wing lands at the base on 18 July 2011.

On 27 November 2010, the USAF selected the squadron and Stewart as its preferred base for eight Boeing C-17 Globemaster III aircraft. The squadron's C-5s were retired and replaced by the C-17s. The initial C-17 assigned to the squadron arrived on 18 July 2011. Unlike its predecessor, the C-17 can take off and land from unpaved runways. The last squadron C-5 departed its Hudson Valley home on 19 September 2012.

In the aftermath of Hurricane Sandy in October 2012, the 105th Airlift Wing and the 213d Engineering Installation Squadron deployed 75 New York guardsmen as part of the state response to the disaster in New York City and Long Island. The Airmen were part of Joint Operations Area 3, Joint Task Force 3 hurricane relief operations in Manhattan and were among more than 2,400 guardsmen deployed at the order of Gov. Andrew M. Cuomo. In 2024, the squadron transported members of the New York Army National Guard and vehicles to help with the recovery effort in North Carolina following Hurricane Helene.

The squadron participated in Operation Allies Refuge, the evacuation from Kabul, Afghanistan in 2021. It airlifted soldiers from the 160th Special Operations Aviation Regiment into Kabul and airlifted a Boeing CH-47 Chinook helicopter and aircrew to support the operation. While evading hostile enemy fire, the squadron evacuated 2,524 men, women and children, including over 800 Afghan nationals. During one flight, a 105th loadmaster discovered an unconscious refugee not breathing and quickly administered CPR, saving the child’s life. On their final Afghanistan mission, aircrew members of the 137th airlifted 13 fallen service members from Kabul.

== Lineage ==
137th Aeromedical Transport Squadron

- Constituted as the 483d Bombardment Squadron (Dive) on 3 August 1942

Activated on 10 August 1942
Redesignated 504th Fighter-Bomber Squadron on 10 August 1943
Redesignated 504th Fighter Squadron on 30 May 1944
Inactivated on 7 November 1945

- Redesignated 137th Fighter Squadron, Single Engine and allotted to the National Guard on 24 May 1946

Activated in May 1948
Received federal recognition on 24 June 1948
Redesignated 137th Fighter-Interceptor Squadron on 1 October 1952
Redesignated 137th Tactical Fighter Squadron on 10 November 1958
Redesignated 137th Aeromedical Transport Squadron, Light on 27 January 1961
Inactivated on 1 December 1961
Consolidated with 137th Military Airlift Squadron^{1} and 137th Military Airlift Squadron^{2} on 17 August 1987

137th Military Airlift Squadron

- Constituted as the 137th Aeromedical Transport Squadron and allotted to the Air National Guard

Activated on 1 May 1961
Redesignated 137th Air Transport Squadron, Heavy on 1 December 1963
Redesignated 137th Military Airlift Squadron^{1} on 8 January 1966
Inactivated on 27 May 1969
Consolidated with 137th Aeromedical Transport Squadron and 137th Military Airlift Squadron^{2} on 17 August 1987

137th Airlift Squadron
Constituted as the 137th Tactical Air Support Squadron and allotted to the Air National Guard on 1 May 1969
Activated on 27 May 1969
Redesignated 137th Military Airlift Squadron^{2} on 1 May 1984
Federalized and ordered to active service on 24 August 1990
Released from active duty and returned to New York state control on 1 August 1991
Consolidated with 137th Aeromedical Transport Squadron and 137th Military Airlift Squadron^{1} on 17 August 1987
Redesignated 137th Airlift Squadron, 18 March 1992 (Note: When the 137th is the major force provider for an expeditionary squadron it is designated 137th Expeditionary Airlift Squadron after June 1996.)

=== Assignments ===
- 339th Bombardment Group (later 339th Fighter-Bomber Group, 339th Fighter Group), 10 August 1942 – 18 October 1945
- Unknown 18 October – 7 November 1945
- 52d Fighter Wing, 24 June 1948
- 107th Fighter Group (later 107th Fighter-Interceptor Group), 8 December 1948
- 106th Composite Group, 1 November 1950
- 107th Fighter Group (later 107th Fighter-Interceptor Group), 1 February 1951
- 105th Fighter Group (later 105th Tactical Fighter Group), 1 May 1956
- 106th Aeromedical Transport Group, 1 February 1961
- 105th Air Transport Group (later 105th Military Airlift Group), 1 December 1963
- 105th Tactical Air Support Group, 1 May 1969
- 105th Tactical Air Support Wing, 14 June 1975
- 105th Tactical Air Support Group (later 105th Military Airlift Group, 105th Airlift Group), 1 July 1979
- 105th Operations Group, 1 October 1995 – present

=== Stations ===
- Hunter Field, Georgia, 10 August 1942
- Drew Field, Florida, 6 February 1943
- Walterboro Army Air Field, South Carolina, 3 July 1943
- Rice Army Air Field, California, 17 September 1943 — 9 March 1944
- Camp Shanks, New York, 14–22 March 1944
- RAF Fowlmere (Station 378), England, 5 April 1944 — 8 September 1945
- Drew Field, Florida, c. 22 September – 7 November 1945
- Westchester County Airport, White Plains, New York, 8 December 1948
- Stewart International Airport (later Stewart Air National Guard Base), Newburgh, New York, 1 May 1983 – present

=== Aircraft ===
- Douglas A-24 Banshee, 1942–1943
- Curtiss A-25 Shrike, 1942
- Bell P-39 Airacobra, 1943–1944
- North American P-51B Mustang, 1944
- North American P-51D Mustang, 1944–1945
- Republic F-47D Thunderbolt, 1948–1951
- North American F-51H Mustang, 1951–1954
- Lockheed F-94B Starfire, 1954–1957
- North American F-86H Sabre, 1957–1961
- Fairchild C-119J Flying Boxcar, 1961–1963
- Boeing C-97 Stratofreighter, 1963–1969
- Cessna U-3A/B Blue Canoe, 1969–1971
- Cessna O-2 Skymaster, 1971–1984
- Lockheed C-5A Galaxy, 1984–2012
- Boeing C-17 Globemaster III, 2011–present

=== Awards and campaigns ===
Award streamer	Award	Dates	Notes
	Distinguished Unit Citation	10–11 September 1944	504th Fighter Squadron
	Air Force Meritorious Unit Award	2020	137th Airlift Squadron
	Air Force Meritorious Unit Award	2021	137th Airlift Squadron
	Air Force Outstanding Unit Award	1 June 1977–31 May 1979	137th Tactical Air Support Squadron
	Air Force Outstanding Unit Award	1 November 1992–31 October 1993	137th Airlift Squadron
	Air Force Outstanding Unit Award	1 July 1999–30 June 2001	137th Airlift Squadron

Campaign Streamer	Campaign	Dates	Notes
	Central Europe	5 April 1944 1944–21 May 1945	504th Fighter-Bomber Squadron (later 504th Fighter Squadron)
	Air Combat, EAME Theater	5 April 1944–11 May 1945	504th Fighter-Bomber Squadron (later 504th Fighter Squadron)
	Air Offensive, Europe	5 April 1944–5 June 1944	504th Fighter-Bomber Squadron (later 504th Fighter Squadron)
	Normandy	6 June 1944–24 July 1944	504th Fighter Squadron
	Northern France	25 July 1944–14 September 1944	504th Fighter Squadron
	Rhineland	15 September 1944–21 March 1945	504th Fighter Squadron
	Ardennes-Alsace	16 December 1944–25 January 1945	504th Fighter Squadron
	Just Cause	20 December 1989–31 January 1990	137th Military Airlift Squadron, Panama
