= 106th Fighter-Interceptor Wing =

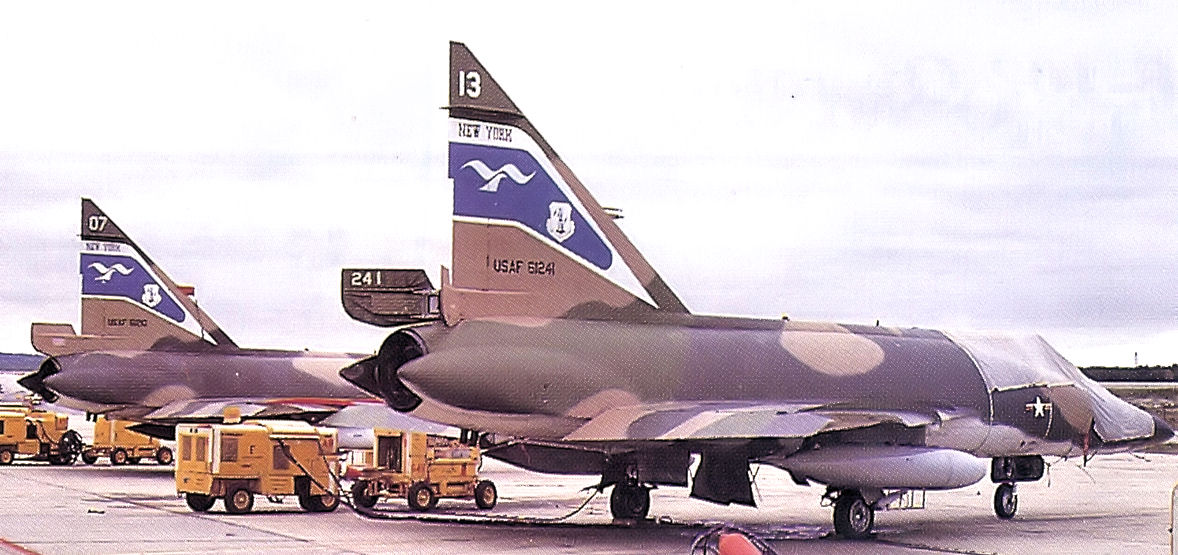
- 102d Fighter-Interceptor Squadron F-102 (Note: Aircraft in foreground is Convair F-102A-70-CO Delta Dagger serial 56-1241. Photographed in September 1974, the interceptors carried an unusual tactical camouflage.)
- Active: 1950–1952; 1952–1975
- Country: United States
- Branch: Air National Guard
- Type: Wing
- Role: Air defense
- Size: About 1,000
- Motto: Readiness Strengthens Liberty

Insignia
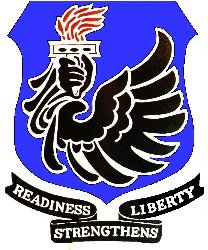
- 106th Fighter-Interceptor Wing emblem (Note: Approved 15 April 1954.)

The 106th Fighter-Interceptor Wing is a former unit of the New York Air National Guard, last stationed at Francis S. Gabreski Air National Guard Base, Westhampton Beach, New York.

The 102d Fighter-Interceptor Squadron, which was assigned to the Wing's 106th Fighter-Interceptor Group, was first organized during World War I as the 102d Aero Squadron on 23 August 1917. It was reconstituted on 4 November 1922, as the 102d Observation Squadron, and is one of theObservation Squadrons of the United States Army National Guard formed before World War II. The squadron has a history going back to 30 April 1908, and is the oldest unit of the New York Air National Guard.

== History ==
=== New York Air National Guard ===
In October 1950, the Air National Guard converted to the wing-base organization. As a result, the 52d Fighter Wing was withdrawn from the Air National Guard and inactivated on 31 October 1950. The 106th Composite Wing was activated as one of two new New York Air National Guard wings (the other being the 107th Fighter Wing at Niagara Falls Airport) which replaced it. Both wings reported to the adjutant general of the New York National Guard in Albany.

==== Korean War activation ====
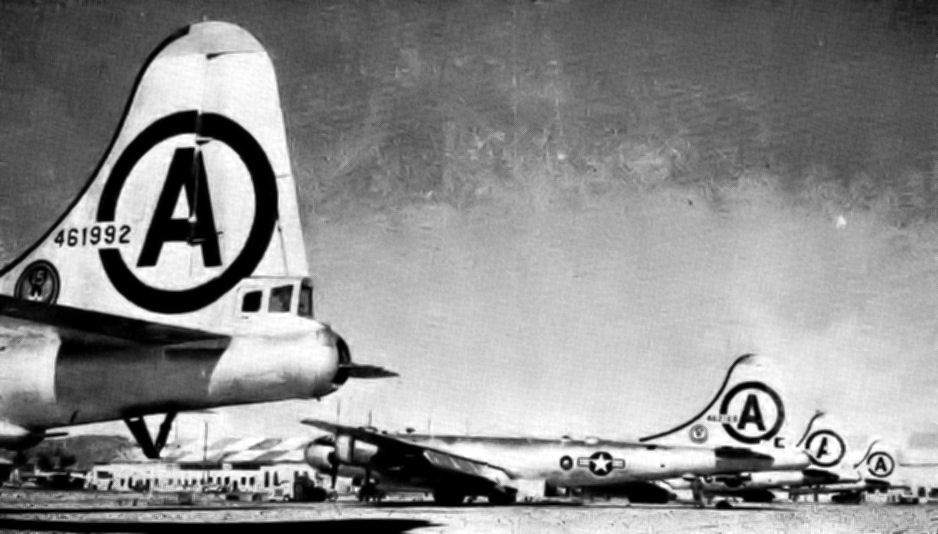
106th Bombardment Wing B-29 Superfortresses at March AFB, 1951

With the surprise invasion of South Korea on 25 June 1950, and the regular military's lack of readiness, most of the Air National Guard was called to active duty. The subordinate 102d and 114th Bombardment Squadron's Douglas B-26 Invader light attack bombers were sent to Fifth Air Force in Japan for use in the Korean War, and the 106th Bomb Group was federalized on 1 February 1951 and assigned to Strategic Air Command. On 28 March 1951, the wing moved to March Air Force Base, California. At March, the 106th was re-equipped with Boeing B-29 Superfortress bombers and tankers and given the mission to train B-29 combat crews for service in Korea. The 106th Wing's personnel and equipment at March were transferred to the 320th Bombardment Wing, which was activated on 1 December 1952 and the 106th Wing was returned to New York state control.

==== Cold War ====
With its return to New York state control, the 106th was again equipped with B-26 Invaders, the aircraft being returned from combat duty in Korea. The 106th trained with the Invader until the removal of the B-26 from bombing duties in 1956 as it neared the end of its service life.

The 106th wartime gaining command was changed from Tactical Air Command to Air Defense Command (ADC) and became the 106th Fighter-Interceptor Wing. It assumed an air defense mission over Long Island and New York City, entering the jet age with the limited all-weather two seat Lockheed F-94B Starfire interceptor. With the Starfire, the 106th began standing end of runway air defense alert, ready to launch interceptors if ADC ground control intercept radars picked up an unidentified target. The wing kept aircraft on air defense alert from one hour before sunrise until one hour after sunset every day. In 1957, ADC upgraded the wing's 102d Fighter-Interceptor Squadron to the single seat North American F-86D Sabre. With the receipt of the F-86D, the alert mission was expanded to full-time.

In 1956, Lt. Col. Norma Parsons made military and National Guard history when she became the first woman member of the National Guard, the first woman member of the Air National Guard, and the first woman to be commissioned in the Air National Guard.

The State of New York was notified by the United States Air Force on 26 September 1957 that support for the wing's 114th Fighter-Interceptor Squadron would be ended due to fiscal constraints. Despite protests from the Governor of New York State that this was in violation of the law with respect to State militia units, the Air Force eventually prevailed and the 114th was inactivated on 30 September 1958.

In 1963 As a result of an agreement between the New York Governor's office and the Air Force, New York accepted a new aeromedical transport mission, thereby preserving the military careers of most 106th Wing personnel and, at the same time, providing the State with a valuable airlift potential. The wing became the 106th Aeromedical Transport Group and its gaining command became Military Air Transport Service (MATS), The 106th worked closely with the 1st Aeromedical Transport Group at Kelly Air Force Base, San Antonio, Texas, a regular Air Force unit.

Initially equipped with specialized Fairchild C-119 Flying Boxcars configured for transport of wounded and injured, the 106th Wing airlifted critically injured and sick personnel until 1964. With air transportation recognized as a critical wartime need, the 106th was redesignated the 106th Air Transport Wing in January 1964 and equipped with Boeing C-97 Stratofreighter heavy transports. With the C-97s, the 106th augmented MATS airlift capability worldwide in support of the Air Force's needs. It also flew scheduled MATS transport missions to Europe, Africa the Caribbean and South America.

With the acquisition of KC-97 Stratotankers from SAC, the 106th gaining command returned to Tactical Air Command in September 1969 and the it became the 106th Air Refueling Wing. Its mission was to provide air refueling to tactical fighter and reconnaissance aircraft. The KC-97 was a variant of the C-97 Stratofreighter and the conversion of the unit from transports to refueling aircraft was easily accomplished. The wing's KC-97Ls had added jet engine pods mounted on their outboard wings. It rotated personnel and aircraft to West Germany as part of Operation Creek Party, a continuous rotational mission flying from Rhein Main Air Base, West Germany, providing air refueling to United States Air Forces in Europe tactical aircraft. The success of this operation, which would continue until 1972, demonstrated the ability of the Air National Guard to perform significant day-to-day missions without being mobilized.

In 1969, the Air Force closed Suffolk County Air Force Base as an active base and the wing relocated there in 1970. The wing returned to the air defense mission in 1972 and again became the 106th Fighter-Interceptor Wing. The wing was equipped with the Convair F-102A Delta Dagger, which was being replaced in the active duty interceptor force by the Convair F-106 Delta Dart. The Mach-2 "Deuce", still a very potent interceptor, served with the 106th Wing until June 1975, when Aerospace Defense Command was reducing the USAF interceptor force as the threat of Soviet Bombers attacking the United States was deemed remote. When the wing's flying element converted to an air rescue mission in 1975, the 106th Wing was inactivated

== Lineage ==
- Constituted as the 106th Composite Wing in October 1950

Activated in the National Guard on 1 November 1950
Redesignated 106th Bombardment Wing, Light on 1 February 1951
Federalized and ordered to active service on 1 March 1951
Inactivated and released from active duty on 1 December 1952
Redesignated 106th Bombardment Wing, Medium on 1 May 1951
Redesignated 106th Bombardment Wing, Light and activated in the Air National Guard on 1 December 1952
Redesignated 106th Bombardment Wing, Tactical in 1955
Redesignated 106th Air Defense Wing on 15 June 1957
Inactivated on 15 September 1958

- Redesignated 106th Air Transport Wing, Heavy in December 1963

Activated on 11 January 1964

- Redesignated 106th Military Airlift Wing on 1 January 1966

Redesignated 106th Air Refueling Wing on 17 September 1969
Redesignated 106th Fighter-Interceptor Wing on 2 December 1972

- Inactivated on 14 June 1975 and withdrawn from the Air National Guard

=== Assignments ===
- New York Air National Guard, 1 November 1950
- First Air Force, 1 February 1951
- 12th Air Division, 1 April 1951 – 1 December 1952
- New York Air National Guard, 1 December 1952 – 14 June 1975

Gained by Tactical Air Command, 1 December 1952
Gained by Air Defense Command, 1 July 1956
Gained by Military Air Transport Service, 1 July 1958
Gained by Military Airlift Command, 8 January 1966
Gained by Tactical Air Command, 17 September 1969
Gained by Aerospace Defense Command, 2 December 1972 – 14 June 1975

=== Components ===
Air National Guard

- 105th Air Transport (later Military Airlift) Group, 11 January 1964 – 17 September 1969
- 106th Bombardment (later Fighter-Interceptor, Aeromedical Transport, Air Transport, Military Airlift, Air Refueling, Fighter-Interceptor) Group, 1 November 1950 – 16 June 1952; 1 December 1952 – 14 June 1975
- 109th Air Transport (later Military Airlift) Group, 11 January 1964 – 17 September 1969

Strategic Air Command

- 102d Bombardment Squadron, 16 June 1952 – 1 December 1952
- 106th Air Refueling Squadron, 16 June 1952 – 1 December 1952 (Note: This is not the same unit as the 106th Air Refueling Squadron of the Alabama Air National Guard. Since 1985, this unit has been redesignated the 66th Special Operations Squadron.)
- 114th Bombardment Squadron, 16 June 1952 – 1 December 1952
- 130th Bombardment Squadron, 16 June 1952 – 1 December 1952
- 106th Armament and Electronics Maintenance Squadron, 8 July 1952 – 1 December 1952
- 106th Field Maintenance Squadron, 16 June 1952 – 1 December 1952
- 106th Periodic Maintenance Squadron, 16 June 1952 – 1 December 1952

=== Stations ===
- Floyd Bennett Field, New York, 1 November 1950
- March Air Force Base, California, 28 March 1951 – 1 December 1952
- Floyd Bennett Field, New York, 1 December 1952
- Suffolk County Air National Guard Base (later Francis S. Gabreski Air National Guard Base), New York, 1 June 1970 – 14 June 1975

=== Aircraft ===
- Douglas B-26 Invader, 1950–1951; 1952–1955
- Boeing B-29 Superfortress, 1951–1952
- Boeing KB-29 Superfortress, 1952
- Lockheed F-94B Starfire, 1956–1957
- North American F-86D Sabre, 1957–1958
- Fairchild MC-119J Flying Boxcar, 1963–1964
- Boeing C-97 Stratofreighter, 1964–1969
- Boeing KC-97L Stratotanker, 1969–1972
- Convair F-102A Delta Dagger, 1972–1975

== See also ==
- F-94 Starfire units of the United States Air Force
- List of F-86 Sabre units
- List of groups and wings of the United States Air National Guard
- List of observation squadrons of the United States Army National Guard

== Bibliography ==
- Cornett, Lloyd H. Jr.; Johnson, Mildred W. (31 December 1980). A Handbook of Aerospace Defense Organization 1946–1980 (PDF). Peterson AFB: Office of History Aerospace Defense Center. Archived (PDF) from the original on 13 February 2016.
- Maurer, Maurer, ed. (1983) [First published 1961]. Air Force Combat Units of World War II (PDF) (reprint ed.). Washington, DC: Office of Air Force History. ISBN 0-912799-02-1. LCCN 61060979. Archived from the original (PDF) on 20 December 2016.
- Mueller, Robert (1989). Active Air Force Bases Within the United States of America on 17 September 1982 (PDF). Air Force Bases. Vol. 1. Washington, D.C.: Office of Air Force History. ISBN 0-912799-53-6. Archived (PDF) from the original on 13 February 2016.
