= 105th Airlift Wing =

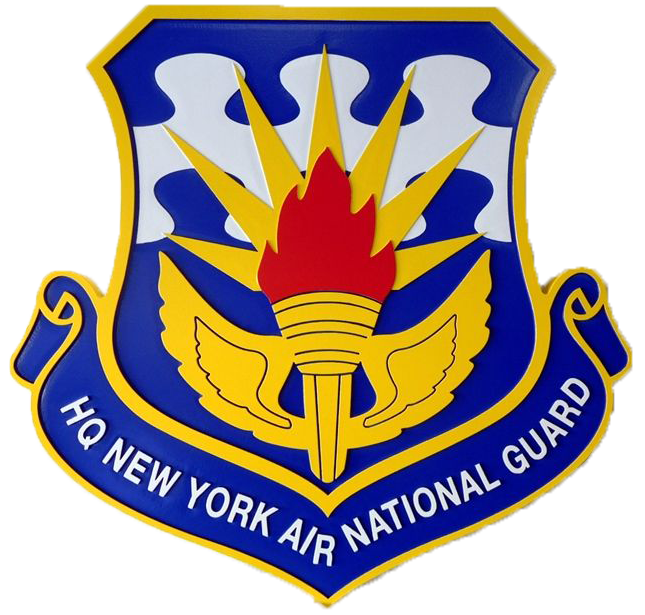
105th Airlift Wing

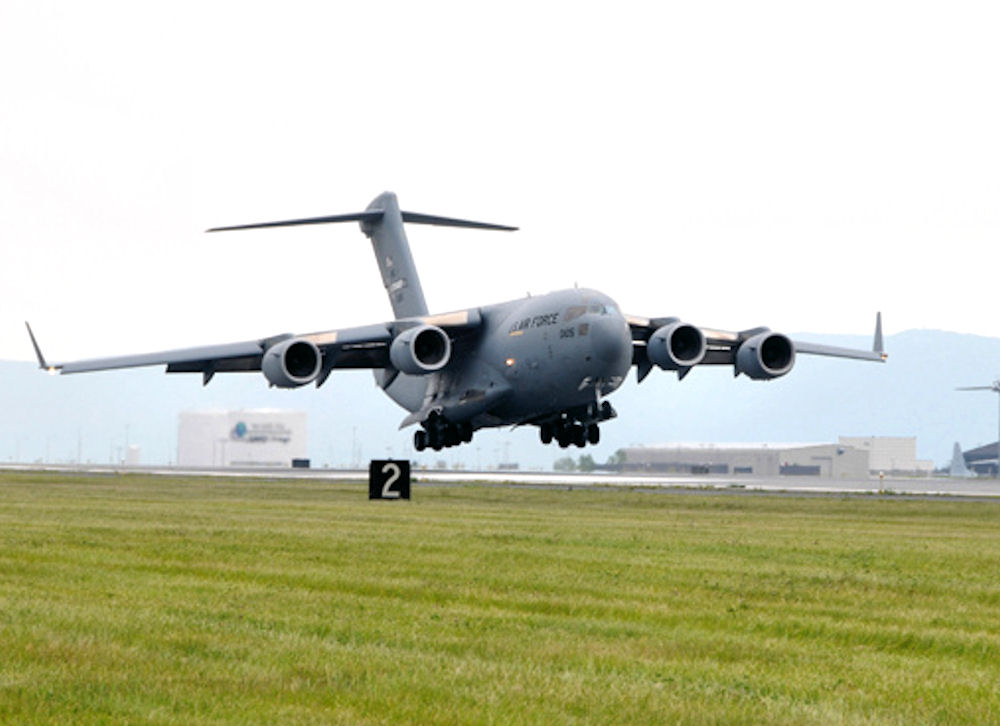
- The first C-17 Globemaster III assigned to the 105th Airlift Wing lands at Stewart ANGB on 11 July 2011.
- Active: 1956–1961; 1963–1969; 1970–present
- Country: United States
- Allegiance: New York
- Branch: Air National Guard
- Type: Wing
- Role: Airlift
- Part of: New York Air National Guard
- Garrison/HQ: Stewart Air National Guard Base, Newburgh, New York
- Website: https://www.105aw.ang.af.mil/

Commanders
- Commander: Col Ryan F. Dannemann
- Vice Commander: Col Matthew C. Brenner
- Command Chief: CCM Joseph A. Cincotta

Insignia
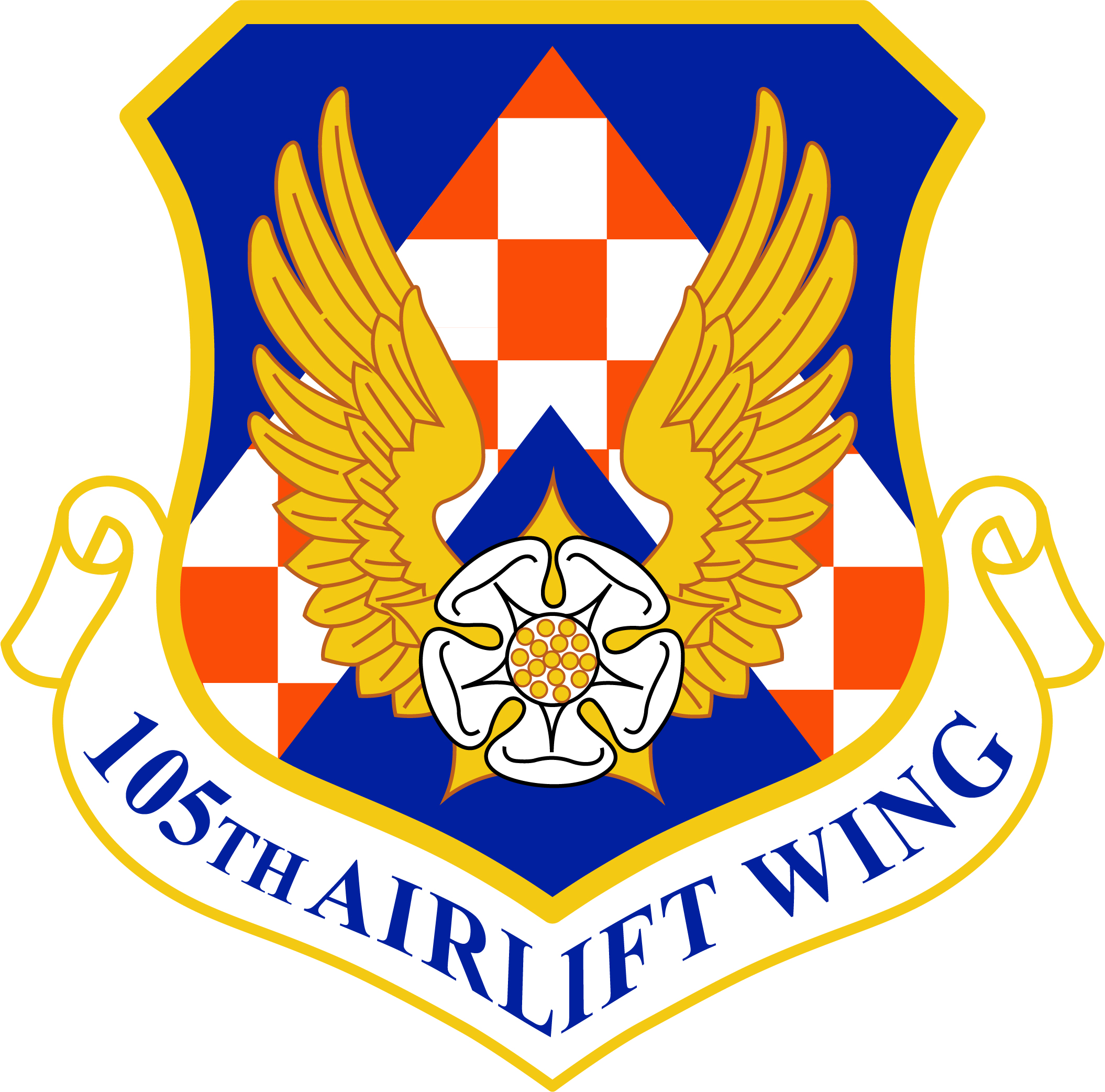
- 105th Airlift Wing emblem
- Tail stripe: Black, "Stewart"

The 105th Airlift Wing is a unit of the New York Air National Guard, stationed at Stewart Air National Guard Base in Newburgh, New York. If activated to federal service, the 105th Airlift Wing will be brought under the command of the United States Air Force Air Mobility Command. It provides highly skilled Airmen and operationally ready equipment necessary to meet United States inter-theater airlift and expeditionary combat support commitments.

== Mission ==
Multiple groups, squadrons, and flights execute the unit's mission by providing administrative and logistical support, including airlift operations, combat control, pararescue, maintenance, supply, transportation, contracting, communications, civil engineering, personnel, base services, security forces, and medical functions.

== Units ==
The 105th Airlift Wing consists of the following major units:

- 105th Operations Group

137th Airlift Squadron
105th Operations Support Squadron

- 105th Maintenance Group

105th Aircraft Maintenance Squadron
105th Maintenance Squadron
105th Maintenance Operations Flight

- 105th Mission Support Group

213th Engineering Installation Squadron
105th Civil Engineering Squadron
105th Force Support Squadron
105th Logistics Readiness Squadron
105th Communications Flight

- 105th Base Defense Group

105th Base Defense Squadron
205th Base Defense Squadron
105th Security Support Squadron

- 105th Medical Group
- 105th Comptroller Flight

== History ==
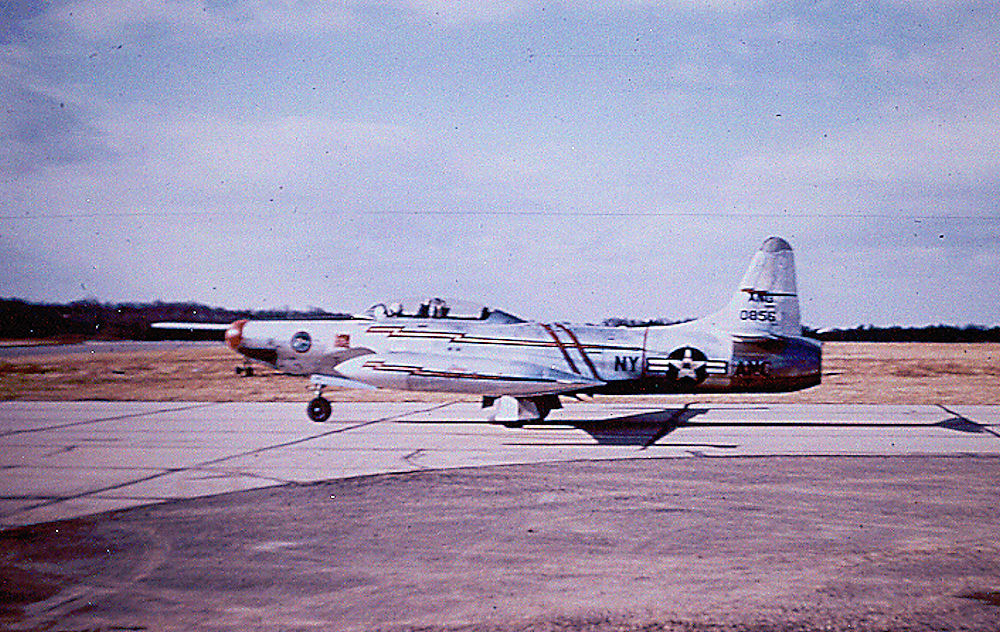
137th Fighter-Interceptor Squadron - Lockheed F-94B-1-LO

Established by the United States Air Force and allotted to New York Air National Guard in 1956. Received federal recognition by the National Guard Bureau and activated on 1 May 1956 as the 105th Fighter Group (Air Defense). The group was assigned to the NY ANG 107th Air Defense Wing and stationed at Westchester County Airport, White Plains, New York.

=== Cold War ===
Its primary mission was the air defense of New York City and Long Island. It was assigned the 137th Fighter-Interceptor Squadron as operational unit, equipped with F-94B Starfires.

A major change to the 107th Air Defense Wing in 1958 was the transition from an Air Defense Command (ADC) mission to Tactical Air Command (TAC) and a tactical fighter mission, the 105th being re-designated as a Tactical Fighter Group and the 137th also being re-designated. The new assignment involved a change in the group's training mission to include high-altitude interception, air-to-ground rocketry, ground strafing and tactical bombing. The 137th TFS retained their F-86H Sabres.

==== Airlift mission ====
The 105th Tactical Fighter Group was inactivated on 1 February 1961 with the 137th being transferred to the 106th Aeromedical Transport Group on 1 February 1961 and was re-designated as the 137th Aeromedical Transport Squadron under the Military Air Transport Service (MATS). The 137th converted to flying the C-119 Flying Boxcar. The squadron airlifted critically injured and sick personnel until late 1963.

With air transportation recognized as a critical need, the 137th was re-designated the 137th Air Transport Squadron (Heavy) 1 December 1963 and equipped with C-97 Stratofreighter heavy transports, although the Aeromedical Flight remained as a secondary mission. With the C-97s, the 102d augmented MATS airlift capability worldwide in support of the Air Force's needs in Europe. It also flew scheduled MATS transport missions to Europe, Africa the Caribbean and South America. On 8 January 1966, Military Air Transport Service became Military Airlift Command (MAC) and the 137th was re-designated as the 137th Military Airlift Squadron.

In 1966, the squadron began operations to and from bases in South Vietnam. During 1967, in addition to the Southeast Asia flights which continued throughout the year until September, the squadron flew missions to South America, Africa, Australia, Asia and Europe in support of the Military Airlift Command and the Joint Chiefs of Staff airlift (directed) missions. The overseas flights also were in addition to a variety of airlift missions flown within the continental United States to include Alaska, Hawaii and Puerto Rico carrying personnel of the active military, Reserve and National Guard units to and from training sites and a continuing series of joint exercises.

==== Forward air support mission ====
In 1969 the C-97s were reaching the end of their operational lifetime and in March, the 105th changed again to become the 105th Tactical Air Support Group and became part of Tactical Air Command. The 137th received interim Cessna U-3 aircraft which was shortly replaced with the O-2A Super Skymaster direct from Cessna. The O-2 was the military version of the Cessna 337 Skymaster, a high wing, twin boom aircraft with a unique centerline pusher/tractor twin engine configuration. The O-2A version, used by the 137th TASS, was used in forward air control (FAC) missions, often in conjunction with a ground FAC and ROMAD (radio operator, maintenance, and driver) team.

The mission of the 105th Tactical Air Support Group was to train forward air controllers and to maintain proficiency in the unit aircraft. An unusual highlight of 1970 was the call to active duty on 24, 25 and 26 March for the New York City Postal Strike, U.S. Post Office workers went off the job in a pay dispute, and President Richard Nixon called on New York City area Guardsmen to sort and deliver the mail. The 105th performed its postal duties at the Main Bronx Post Office, on the Grand Concourse in the Bronx. Members of the unit were rewarded for this service with a year off their active reserve commitment. The NYANG ramp at the Westchester County Airport continued to be the "entrance of choice" by foreign dignitaries, and President Nixon during 1970. The Presidents of France, Ecuador, and several other foreign notables landed there on visits to the U.S. President Nixon arrived there during his campaign for Republican Congressmen in the fall

During this time, the unit received the Air Force Outstanding Unit Award. After becoming a part of the Tactical Air Command, the unit received the New York State Governor's Trophy, as the State's outstanding flying unit, more than one half of the years.

As part of the draw-down of forces in Southeast Asia, aircraft from the Vietnam War were added to make up the allocated number to the Group. However, the 105th had to actually rebuild most of the Vietnam Veteran aircraft, which had been through the most rigorous of combat operations in South Vietnam. The 105th made national news through their program of assisting local governmental health agencies in the detection of violations of water and stream pollution laws. 105th pilots, on the kind of observation missions they would be doing in combat, initiated a program of photography and reporting to local civic officials. The local health agency would then send its own aircraft up to take similar photographs for evidence and possible action. The 105th was awarded the Governor's Trophy for 1974, signifying the outstanding flying unit of the New York Air National Guard for that year.

The 105th was upgraded to a wing on 14 June 1975, the group becoming the operational organization for the new wing organization. In August 1978, the group was inactivated with the 137th TASS being assigned directly to the Wing. However, the unit reverted to Group status on 1 July 1979, when the Wing organization was transferred to the 174th Tactical Fighter Group to accommodate the newly organized A-10 Thunderbolt II Wing.

In 1981, the group deployed to Lechfeld Air Base, West Germany, to observe A-10 close air support operations, and forward air control in the NATO/USAFE environment. The visit provided a first-hand look at tactics used by various NATO members, as well as an in-depth look at forward operating locations and NATO air tasking orders.

In the early 1980s, it became apparent that the facility at Westchester Airport was not large enough to support a conversion to a new aircraft or mission. The state's Division of Military and Naval Affairs started negotiations with National Guard Bureau to relocate the unit. As a result, USAF and the Air National Guard approved a unit relocation to Stewart International Airport, Newburgh, New York. This move took advantage of the excellent airfield facilities at Stewart, which was an active Air Force Base through 1969. The move, initiated during 1982, was completed by the last quarter of 1983.

==== Strategic airlift ====
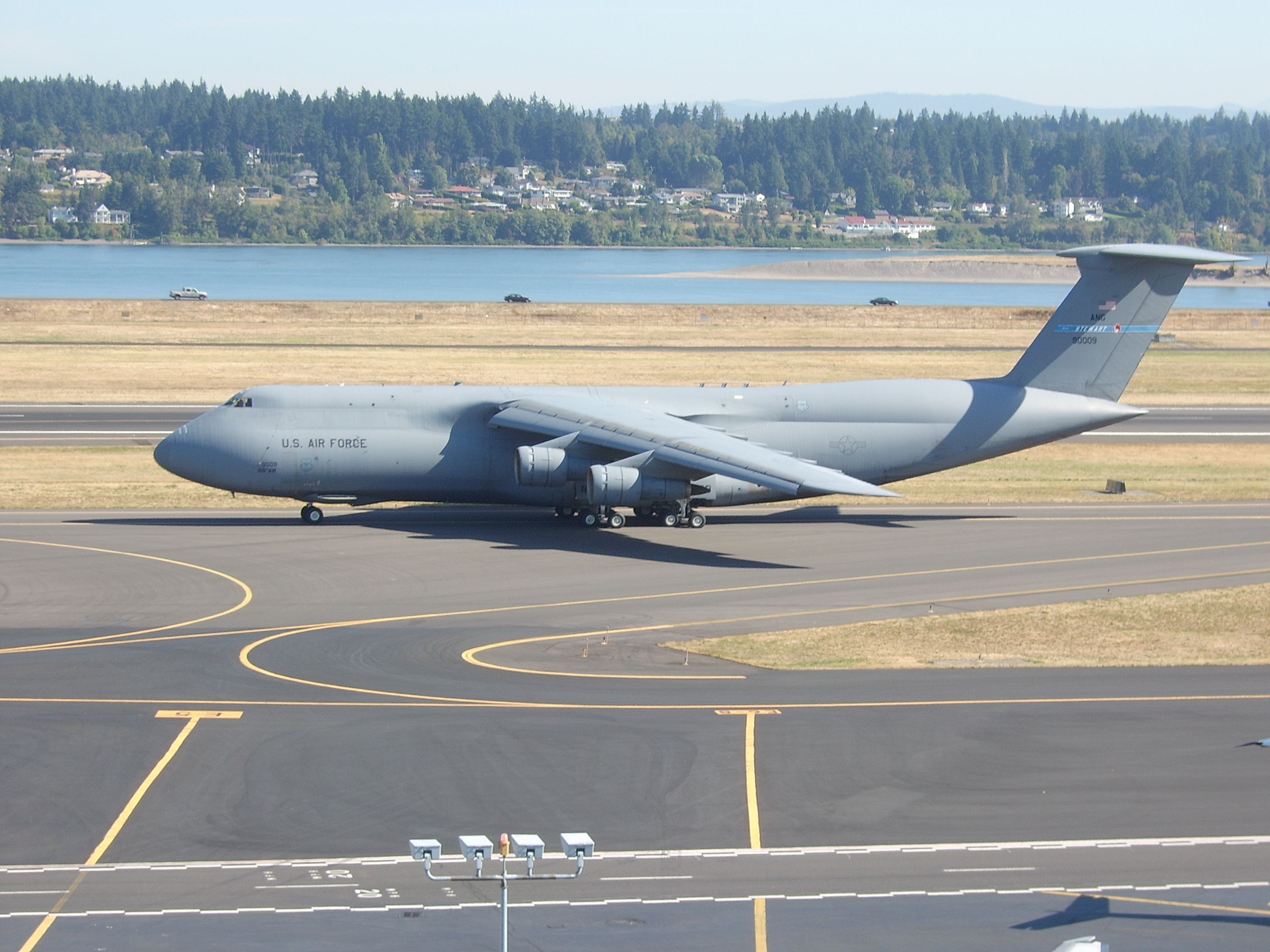
137th Airlift Squadron C-5A taxiing for takeoff at Portland International Airport

In May 1983, the unit relocated to Stewart International Airport. It was re-designated the 105th Military Airlift Group on 1 May 1984 and later in July 1985 became the first Air National Guard unit in the nation to fly the C-5A Galaxy aircraft. Soon after receiving its first C-5A aircraft, in October 1985 the unit airlifted 84,600 pounds of cots and bedding to Puerto Rico following Hurricane Gloria.

In October 1988, the 105th airlifted 300,000 pounds of hurricane relief and reconstruction supplies to Jamaica following Hurricane Gilbert. In January 1989, the unit carried 146,610 pounds of earthquake relief supplies to aid Soviet Armenia. In March 1989, the 105th responded with less than 24 hours notice to an AMC request to airlift an over 80,000-pound submersible vehicle from Andrews AFB, Maryland and Homestead AFB, Florida, to Kadena AB, Japan to assist in search and recovery operations for an Air Force Sikorsky SH-3 Sea King helicopter which crashed in the East China Sea. Throughout the summer and fall of 1989, the 105th continued to support reconstruction efforts in Jamaica by airlifting National Guard civil engineering teams and equipment to that island nation.

Beginning in October 1989, the unit airlifted over 2,000,000 pounds of relief supplies to Puerto Rico and the Virgin Islands following Hurricane Hugo. In December 1991, the 105th airlifted over 145,000 pounds of clothing, blankets and medical supplies to Bucharest, Romania. In February 1992, the unit participated in Operation Provide Hope, the airlift of humanitarian aid to the Commonwealth of Independent States (former Soviet Union), delivering 384,000 pounds of relief materials to Saint Petersburg, Russia, and Yerevan, Armenia.

1989 ended on a dramatic note for the 105th Airlift Wing as it performed its wartime mission in support of Operation Just Cause. The over 2,200,000 pounds of cargo airlifted by the 105th in support of that operation represented approximately 25% of the initial total airlift effort of all of the Military Airlift Command's C-5 fleet assigned to both active duty and reserve component elements.

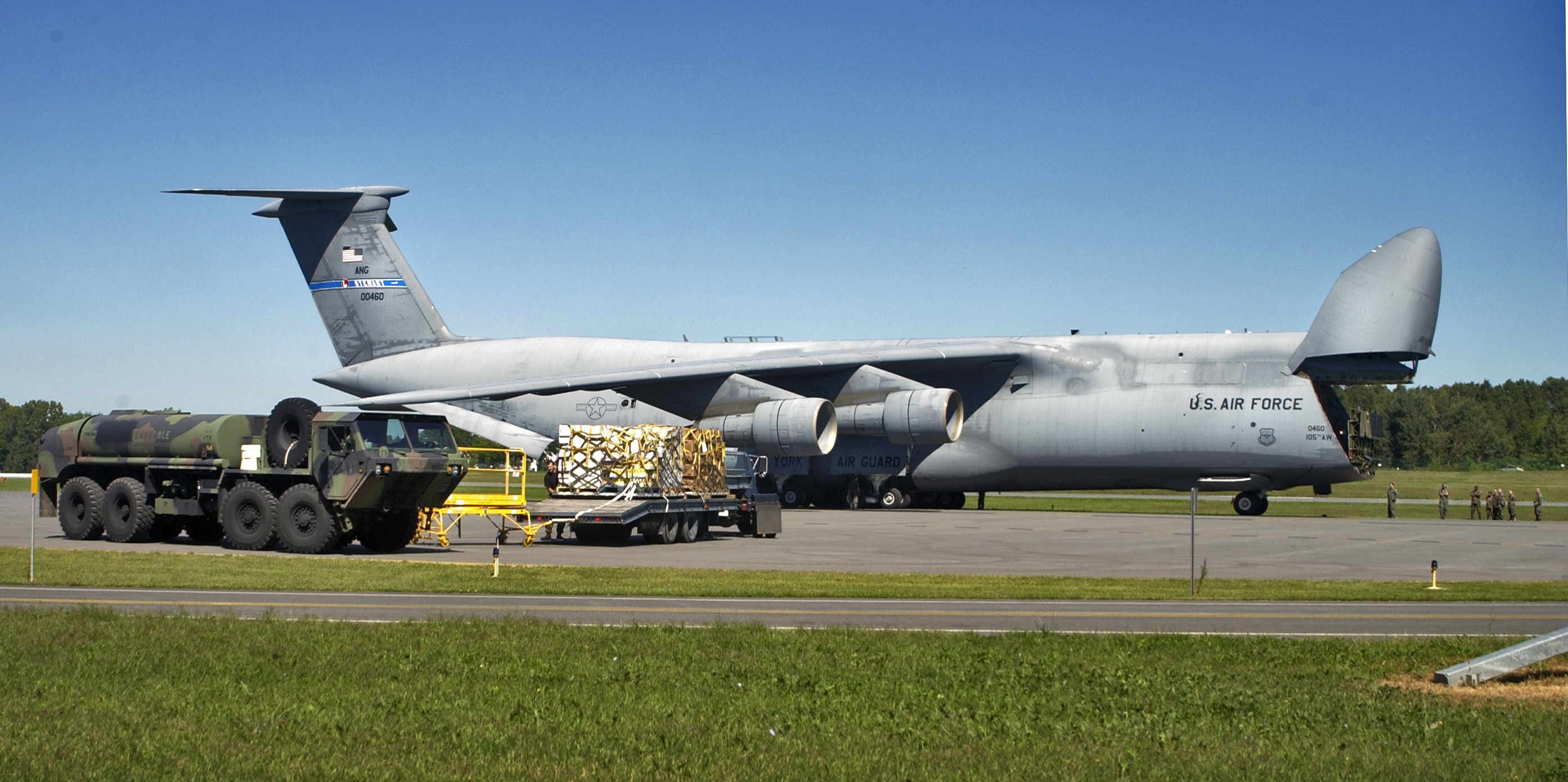
137th AS C-5A Galaxy (s/n 70-0460) sits on the flightline before cargo is loaded on 5 September 2005 by airmen with the 109th Aerial Port Squadron at the Albany International Airport. The cargo was bound for Gulfport, Mississippi, in support of Hurricane Katrina relief operations.

On 7 August 1990, Governor Mario Cuomo announced that the Department of Defense had requested, and he had approved, the participation of the personnel and C-5A aircraft of the 105th in active and direct support of Operation Desert Shield in the Persian Gulf region. On 24 August, the 137th Military Airlift Squadron was called to active duty by President George H. W. Bush to provide continued support for the operation. While the 137th was released from active duty on 15 May 1991, the majority of unit members chose to remain in active status until 1 August 1991 in response to the Military Airlift Command's need for continuing airlift support of Operation Desert Storm and Operation Provide Comfort (Kurdish relief).

On 28 February 1991, a part of the 105th USAF Clinic was also called to active duty with duty stations at Malcolm Grow Medical Center, Andrews AFB, Maryland. All medical personnel were released from active duty during May 1991

In March 1992, with the end of the Cold War, the 105th adopted the Air Force Objective Organization plan, and the unit was re-designated as the 105th Airlift Group. On 1 October 1995, in accordance with the Air Force "One Base – One Wing" policy, the 105th Airlift Wing was established and the 137th Airlift Squadron was assigned to the new 105th Operations Group.

In September 1992, the unit responded to Hurricane Andrew, delivering 1,289,953 pounds of food, tents, mobile kitchens, vehicles, and emergency services personnel to the Homestead area of South Florida. In November 1992, the 105th airlifted 118,450 pounds—including generators, portable shelters and medical supplies and equipment—to Zagreb, Croatia to support the U.S. Army's 212th Mobile Army Surgical Hospital's establishment of a facility to provide a full range of health care for United Nations forces deployed in Croatia and Bosnia-Herzegovina. From December 1992 to April 1993, the 105th supported Operation Restore Hope, providing humanitarian airlift of 2,800,000 pounds of supplies and over 600 passengers into Somalia. Following massive flooding in the central United States in July 1993, the unit airlifted, to Des Moines, Iowa; ten reverse osmosis water purification systems weighing a total of over 380,000 pounds and capable of providing over 600,000 gallons of potable water a day. In August 1993 the unit airlifted 75 tons of relief supplies and equipment to Southern Turkey to be used to help Kurdish refugees from Iraqi terrorism.

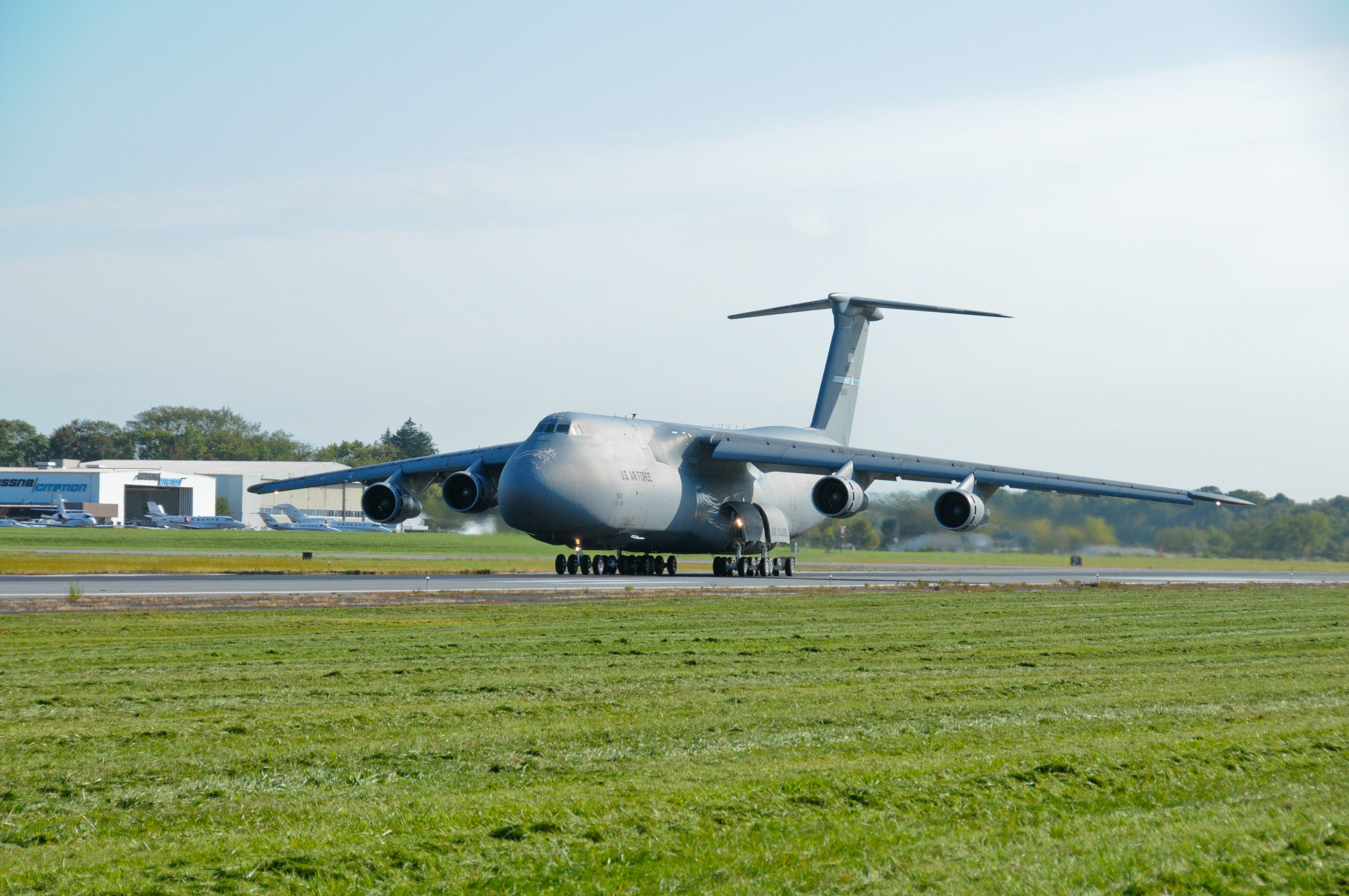
The last 105th Airlift Wing based C-5A Galaxy, tail number 0001, on take-off roll leaving its Hudson Valley home for the last time 19 September 2012.

In October 1993, the 105th returned to Somalia, delivering military personnel and almost 860,000 pounds of equipment non-stop—with triple air refueling—directly from bases in the United States to Mogadishu. In July 1994, 105th aircraft began carrying humanitarian relief supplies to the people of Rwanda—by early September 1,635,189 pounds of supplies and equipment were delivered to the African Great Lakes region. In late September 1994, the unit began airlifting over a million pounds of supplies and equipment to Haiti as part of Operation Uphold Democracy. The 105th played a key role in July 1995 for Operation Quick Lift when it airlifted 431,000 pounds of cargo and 190 British troops from RAF Brize Norton, UK to Split Croatia in support of the United Nations' Rapid Reaction Deployment Force.

In October 1994, 105th aircraft and volunteer crews played a role in Operation Vigilant Warrior and Operation Southern Watch, deterring potential Iraqi aggression in the Arabian Peninsula. In August 1995, the 105th played a role in airlifting personnel and equipment to Kuwait in support of Operation Vigilant Warrior II and Exercise Intrinsic Action.

Immediately following Hurricane Marilyn in September 1995, the unit airlifted 527,200 pounds of supplies and equipment to the citizens of the American Virgin Islands.

In December 1995, 105th Airlift Wing C-5 crews embarked on the first of six missions in support of President Clinton's peacekeeping mission in Bosnia, transporting almost 800,000 pounds of U.S. Army support equipment to the European theater. The 105th returned to the African Great Lakes country of Rwanda in March 1996 to deliver 120,000 pounds of supplies and equipment in support of the Rwandan War Crimes Tribunal and the World Food Program.

In mid-1996, the Air Force, in response to budget cuts and changing world situations, began experimenting with Air Expeditionary organizations. The Air Expeditionary Force (AEF) concept was developed that would mix active-duty, reserve and Air National Guard elements into a combined force. Instead of entire permanent units deploying as "provisional" as in the 1991 Gulf War, expeditionary units are composed of "aviation packages" from several wings, including active-duty Air Force, the Air Force Reserve Command and the Air National Guard, would be married together to carry out the assigned deployment rotation.

Since 1996, the 137th Expeditionary Airlift Squadron was formed and deployed in support of world contingencies including Operation Joint Endeavor, Operation Allied Force, and Operation Joint Guardian. After the September 11 attacks in 2001, the 137th EAS was formed and activated to support Operation Northern Watch, Operation Enduring Freedom and Operation Iraqi Freedom.

==== Post Cold War Era ====
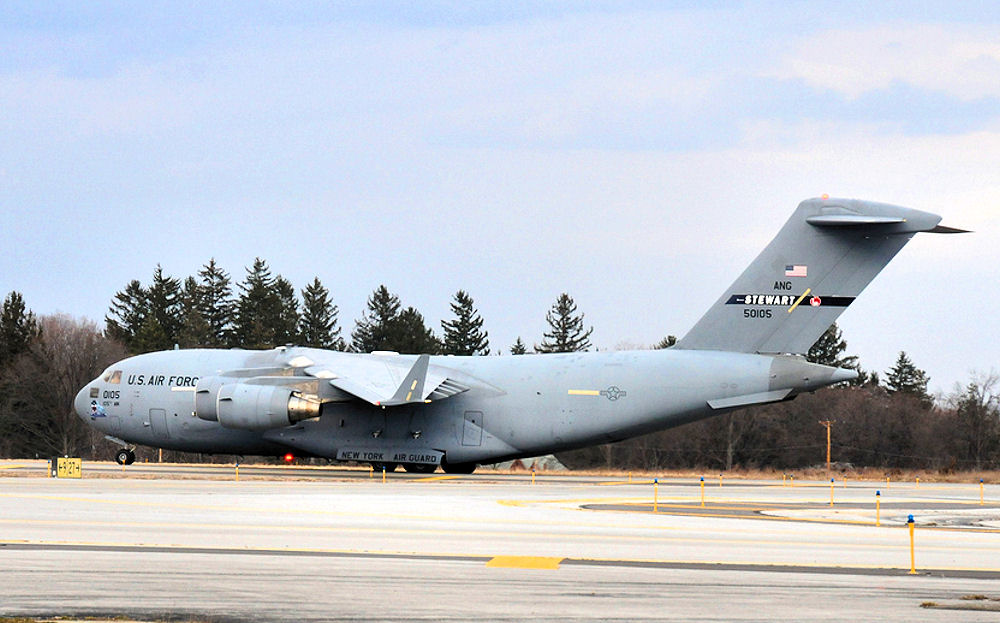
137th Airlift Squadron – McDonnell Douglas C-17A Globemaster III 95-0005

On 27 November 2010, the USAF selected the New York Air National Guard's 105th Airlift Wing at Stewart Air National Guard Base as its "preferred base" for eight C-17 Globemaster III aircraft. The 12 C-5A Galaxy operated by the 105th AW were retired and replaced by the C-17s. The last 105th Airlift Wing based C-5A Galaxy, tail number 0001, departed its Hudson Valley home for the last time on 19 September 2012.

The initial C-17 assigned to Stewart AGB, tail number 50105, arrived on 18 July 2011. The 105th AW C-17 roll-out ceremony was held 6 August 2011 with two C-17s being placed on display during the event, the first of eight which replaced the larger, aging C-5A fleet. Unlike its predecessor, the C-17 can take off and land from unpaved runways.

In the aftermath of Hurricane Sandy in October 2012, the 105th Airlift Wing and the 213d Engineering Installation Squadron deployed 75 New York ANG Airmen as part of the state response to the disaster in New York City and Long Island. The Airmen were part of Joint Operations Area 3, Joint Task Force 3 hurricane relief operations in Manhattan and were among more than 2,400 Army and ANG service members deployed at the order of Gov. Andrew M. Cuomo.

== Lineage ==
105th Military Airlift Group

- Constituted as the 105th Fighter Group (Air Defense) and allotted to the Air National Guard in 1956

Activated in the New York Air National Guard on 1 May 1956 and received federal recognition
Redesignated 105th Tactical Fighter Group on 10 November 1958
Redesignated '105th Aeromedical Transport Group
Inactivated on 1 February 1961
Consolidated on 18 August 1987 with the 105th Military Airlift Group'^{1} and the 105th Military Airlift Group'^{2}

105th Military Airlift Group

- Redesignated 105th Air Transport Group, Heavy and allotted to the Air National Guard

Activated and federally recognized on 10 December 1963 (Note: The Air Force constituted the 105th Air Transport Group, Heavy on 16 December 1963. This action was revoked on 15 September 1964 and the 105th Tactical Fighter Group was retroactively redesignated as the 105th Air Transport Group.)
Redesignated 105th Military Airlift Group on 1 January 1966
Inactivated on 27 May 1969
Consolidated on 18 August 1987 with the 105th Aeromedical Transport Group' and the 105th Military Airlift Group'^{2}

105th Airlift Wing
Constituted as the 105th Tactical Air Support Group and allotted to the Air National Guard
Activated on 1 March 1970
Redesignated 105th Military Airlift Group on 1 May 1984
Consolidated on 18 August 1987 with the 105th Aeromedical Transport Group' and the 105th Military Airlift Group'^{1}
Redesignated 105th Airlift Group on 18 March 1992
Redesignated 105th Airlift Wing on 1 October 1995

=== Assignments ===
- 107th Air Defense Wing (later 107th Tactical Fighter Wing), 1 May 1956
- 106th Air Transport Wing (later 106th Military Airlift Wing), 1 February 1961
- New York Air National Guard, 1 March 1970
- 105th Tactical Air Support Wing, 14 June 1975
- 128th Tactical Air Support Wing, 1 July 1979
- New York Air National Guard, 1 May 1984

Gaining Commands

Military Air Transport Service, 1 May 1956
Military Airlift Command, 1 January 1966
Tactical Air Command, 1 May 1969
Military Airlift Command, 1 May 1984
Air Mobility Command, 1 June 1992 – present

=== Components ===
- 105th Operations Group, 1 October 1995 – present
- 137th Fighter-Interceptor Squadron (later 137th Tactical Fighter Squadron, 137th Air Transport Squadron, 137th Military Airlift Squadron, 137th Tactical Air Support Squadron, 137th Military Airlift Squadron, 137th Airlift Squadron), 1 May 1956 – 1 October 1995

=== Stations ===
- Westchester County Airport, White Plains, New York, 1 May 1956
- Stewart International Airport (later Stewart Air National Guard Base), Newburgh, New York, 1 May 1983

=== Aircraft ===
- F-94B Starfire, 1958–1957
- F-86H Sabre, 1957–1961
- MC-119J Flying Boxcar, 1961–1963
- C-97 Stratofreighter, 1963–1969
- U-3A/B Blue Canoe, 1969–1971
- O-2 Skymaster, 1971–1984
- C-5A Galaxy, 1984–2012
- C-17 Globemaster III, 2011–Present
