= Stewart Air National Guard Base =

US military base at Stewart International Airport, New York

- Near Newburgh, New York in the United States
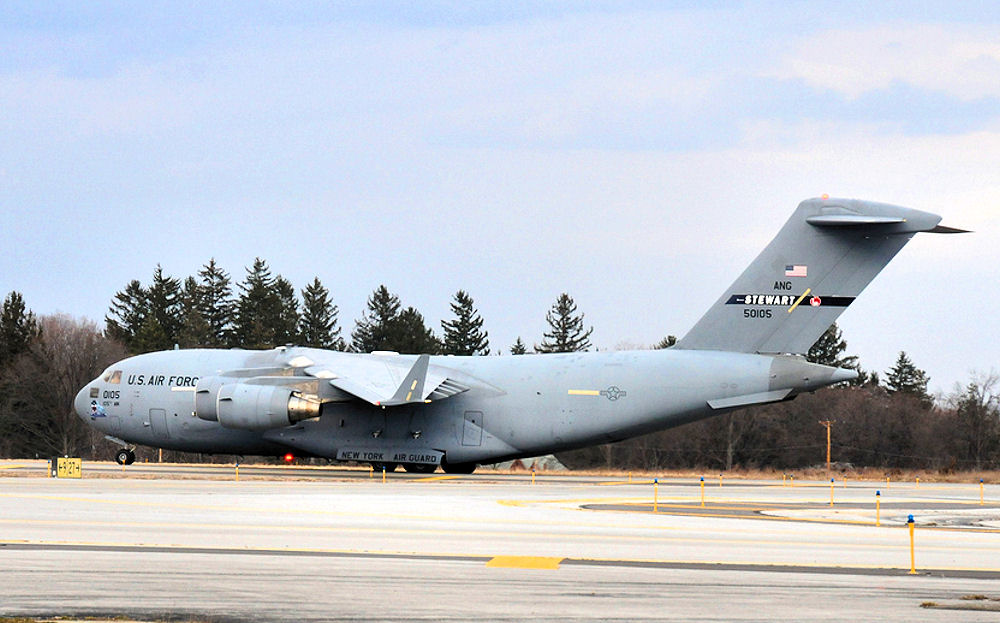
- A C-17A Globemaster III assigned to the 105th Airlift Wing of the New York Air National Guard at Stewart ANGB.

Site information
- Type: Air National Guard Base
- Owner: Department of Defense
- Operator: US Air Force (USAF)
- Controlled by: New York Air National Guard (ANG)
- Condition: Operational
- Website: www.105aw.ang.af.mil

Location
- Location in the United States Stewart ANGB (the United States)
- Coordinates: 41.5027°N 74.0830°W

Site history
- Built: 1934
- In use: 1934–1970; 1980–present

Garrison information
- Garrison: 105th Airlift Wing (host)

Airfield information
- Identifiers: IATA: SWF, ICAO: KSWF, FAA LID: SWF, WMO: 725038
- Elevation: 149.6 metres (491 ft) AMSL
Runways
| Direction | Length and surface |
|---|---|
| 9/27 | 3,601.8 metres (11,817 ft) Asphalt |
| 16/34 | 1,830.019 metres (6,004 ft) Asphalt |
- Airfield shared with New York Stewart International Airport. Source: Federal Aviation Administration

Stewart Air National Guard Base, located in Orange County, New York, is the base of the 105th Airlift Wing (105 AW), an Air Mobility Command unit of the New York Air National Guard and "host" wing for the installation. The airport also hosts extensive civilian facilities, known alternately as Newburgh-Stewart, Stewart International Airport or New York Stewart International.

Stewart Airfield opened in 1934 at the direction of Douglas MacArthur as a training facility for the nearby United States Military Academy (West Point). The base is named in honor of a 19th-century Scottish-born sea captain, Lachlan Stewart, and his son, who donated the land it now occupies. It was built out significantly during World War II.

In 1948 it transitioned to the newly formed United States Air Force to become the Stewart Air Force Base while also continuing its training mission with West Point. In 1958 it added a SAGE direction center, DC-02, controlling the Boston Air Defense Sector. Most operations at Stewart wound down in the 1960s. The base was deactivated in 1970 and taken over by New York State as a civilian airport.

The current base opened in 1980 by agreement between the state and the ANG. The next year, it was the arrival airport for the freed American hostages from Iran.

On January 3, 2026, Venezuelan president Nicolás Maduro was captured by U.S. military and law enforcement forces, was initially transferred to USS Iwo Jima, then flown to Stewart.

== Overview ==
Located in the Town of Newburgh, New York, the 105th Airlift Wing's mission is to provide peacetime and wartime inter-theater airlift operations using the Boeing C-17 Globemaster III. Newburgh is approximately 60 miles (97 km) north of New York City, NY and 100 miles (160 km) due south of Albany, the capital of New York State. The air national guard base encompasses 267 acres (107 ha) and contains 36 buildings, amounting to approximately 757,000 square feet (68,130 m^{2}). There is no family or transient military housing, with military personnel residing outside of a 50 miles (80 km) radius normally being billeted in nearby hotels and motels under military contract arrangements.

== Units ==
The day-to-day military population of Stewart ANGB is approximately 660 full-time Air National Guard personnel, both Air Reserve Technician (ART) and Active Guard and Reserve (AGR) personnel, plus approximately 150 additional active duty Army, AGR Army Reserve and AGR Army National Guard, active duty Marine Corps and Active Reserve Marine Corps personnel. This is further augmented on a daily basis by a fluctuating number of over 3,000 additional traditional, part-time Air National Guard, Army National Guard, Army Reserve and Selected Marine Corps Reserve (SMCR) personnel.

Because of the operational flying missions, most of the personnel of the Air National Guard, the Army National Guard, the Army Reserve and the Marine Corps Reserve are funded for, and perform, additional military duty in either a drilling status or an active duty status far in excess of the typical ground-based reserve or national guard unit. For example, on at least one weekend each month, the 105 AW's population surges to over 1,600 personnel in response to the monthly required Air National Guard unit training assembly (UTA), attended by nearly all of the 105 AW's personnel.

In 1988, the United States Marine Corps became a tenant of the Stewart ANGB with the establishment of Marine Air Refueler and Transport Squadron Four Five Two (VMGR-452), along with Marine Aviation Logistics Squadron 49 (MALS-49) and Marine Aircraft Group 49 (MAG-49), Detachment Bravo. A Marine Corps Reserve unit of the 4th Marine Aircraft Wing, VMGR-452 has operated KC-130T Hercules aircraft available for worldwide tasking in support of Marine Expeditionary Forces and combatant commanders and is transitioning to the KC-130J Hercules.

Stewart Army Subpost and the Stewart-Newburgh Armed Forces Reserve Center are also located on Stewart ANGB. The former supports the U.S. Military Academy, the 1st Battalion, 1st Infantry Regiment (1-1 INF BN) and the UH-72 Lakota-equipped 2nd Aviation Detachment (2ND AVN DET), while the latter supports the consolidation of several smaller and obsolescent United States Army Reserve Centers and New York Army National Guard Armories throughout the Hudson River Valley, colocating their associated units at a single site with modern training facilities.

The United States Army Reserve also maintains the Stewart-Newburgh Armed Forces Reserve Center on the installation.

In November 2010, it was announced that the Air Force had selected Stewart ANGB as its "preferred base" for eight C-17 Globemaster III jet cargo aircraft slated to be operated by the Air National Guard for the Air Mobility Command, with the twelve C-5A Galaxy cargo aircraft operated by the 105 AW at the base to be retired and replaced by the C-17s. In March 2011, Air Force officials announced that the 105 AW had been chosen as the final basing decision for eight C-17 Globemaster III mobility aircraft. The 105 AW's first C-17, AF Ser. No. 05-0105, arrived on 1 July 2011 and the wing commenced retiring their C-5 aircraft and transitioning to the C-17. This transition was completed in September 2012 with the departure of the wing's last C-5 aircraft.

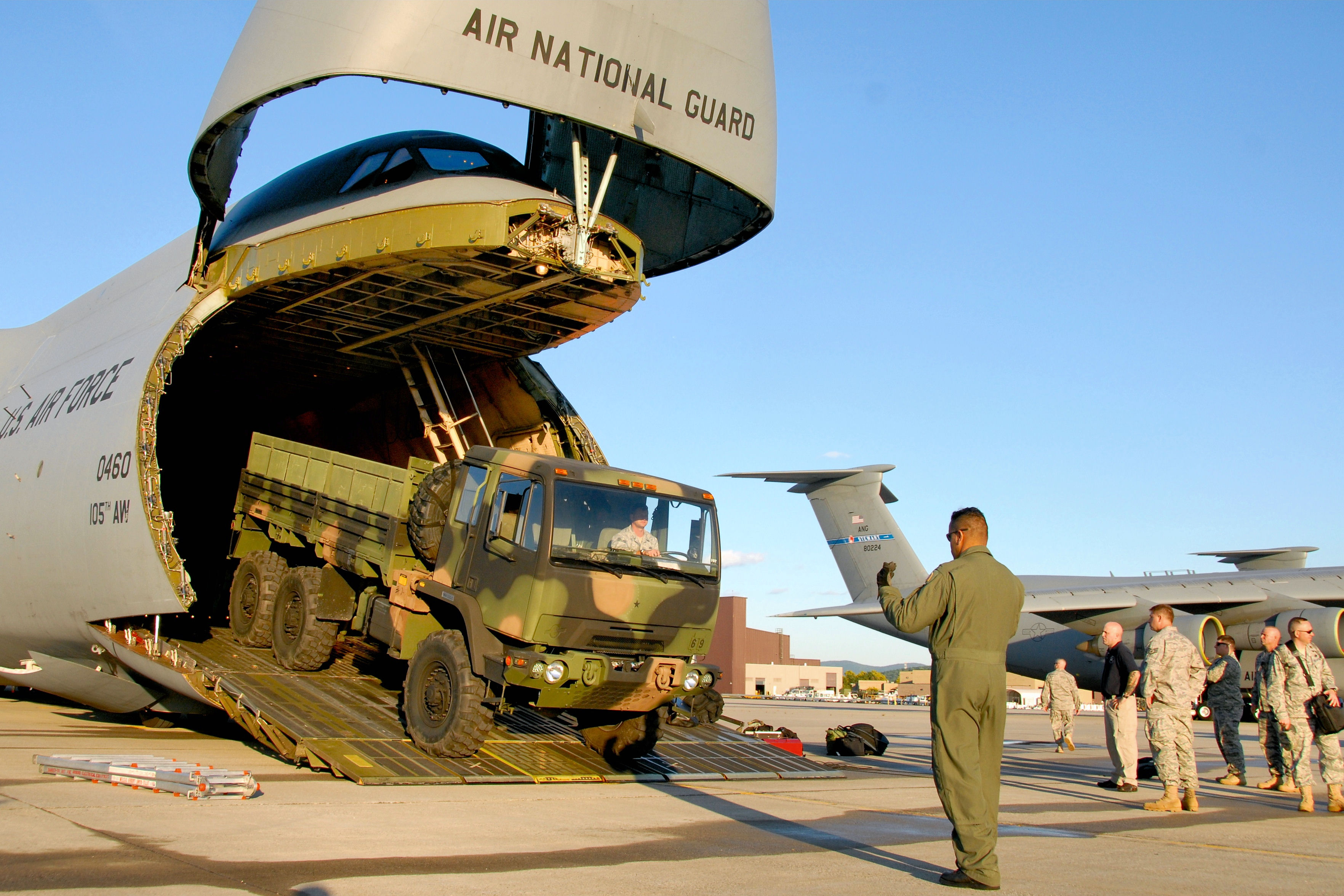
A 105th Airlift Wing C-5 Galaxy being unloaded

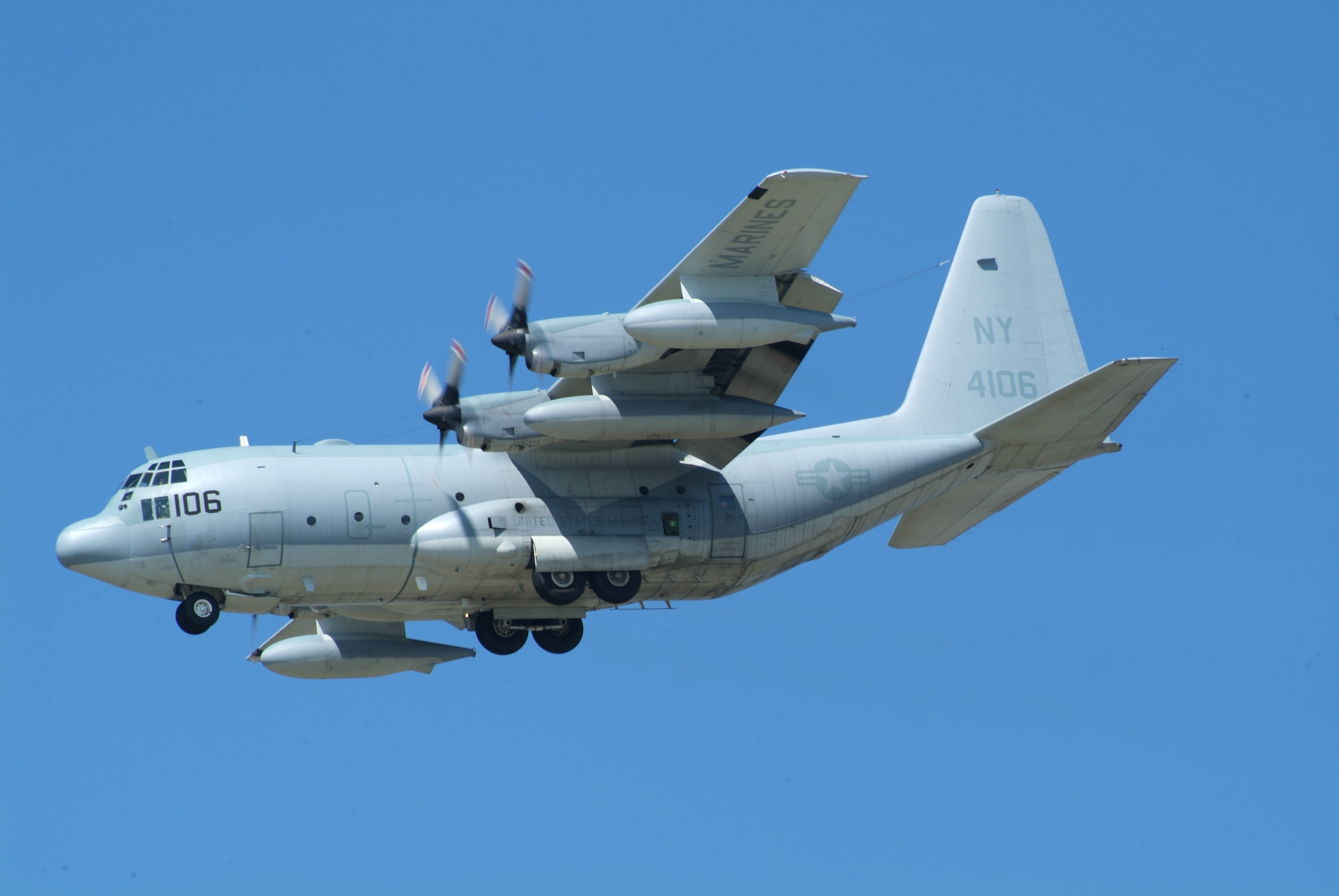
A VMGR-452A KC-130T tanker landing.

New York Air National Guard

- 105th Airlift Wing
- 137th Airlift Squadron
- 105th Maintenance Squadron
- 105th Operations Group
- 105th Operations Support Flight
- 105th Mission Support Group
- 213th Engineering Installation Squadron

United States Marine Corps

- Marine Innovation Unit (MIU)
- Marine Aviation Logistics Squadron 49 (MALS-49)
- Marine Aircraft Group 49 (MAG-49), Detachment Bravo

United States Military Academy

- 2nd Aviation Detachment (2ND AVN DET) "Wings of West Point"

== Disaster relief ==
In August 2005 the 105th Airlift Wing supported U.S. Air Force missions including the delivery of emergency supplies and personnel following Hurricane Katrina. Transported cargo and search and rescue teams to assist following the January 2010 Haiti earthquake.

Stewart was the debarkation point for the Air Force's airlift of critically needed utility vehicles and linemen for Hurricane Sandy relief efforts in the Northeast.

In September 2017 the 105th Airlift Wing assisted in the delivery of vital equipment and aid supplies to Puerto Rico after the devastating Hurricane Maria, transporting more than 231 tons of cargo including 326 personnel, seven UH-60 Black Hawk helicopters, 54 vehicles and 41 pallets of supplies.

== See also ==
- New York World War II Army Airfields
- List of USAF Aerospace Defense Command General Surveillance Radar Stations
