= Operation Provide Hope =

1992 – 1994 USAF humanitarian mission

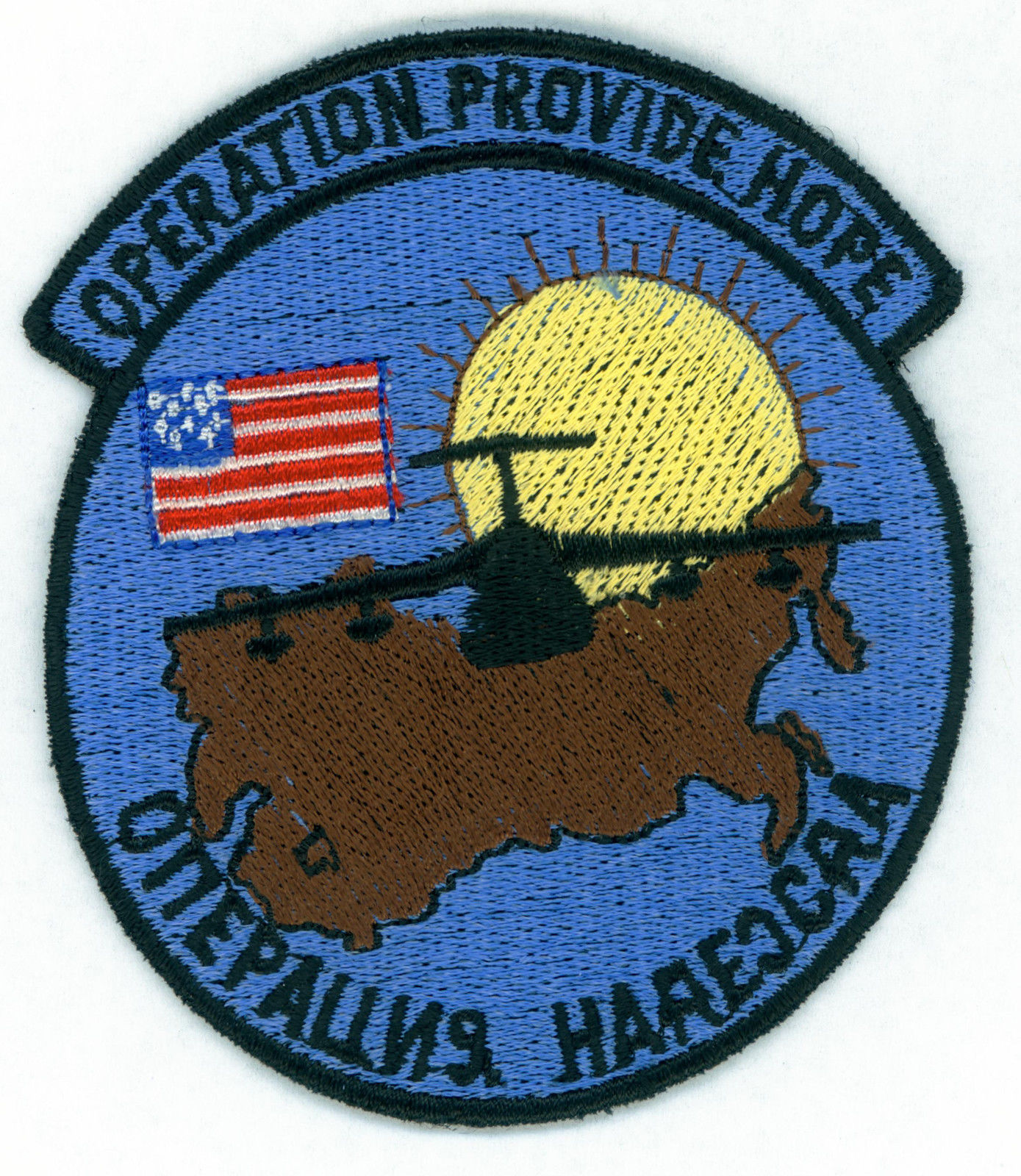
This patch of Operation Provide Hope was made in Incirlik, Turkey, circa 1992.

Operation Provide Hope was a humanitarian operation conducted by the U.S. Air Force to provide medical equipment to former Soviet republics during their transition to market economies.

== History ==
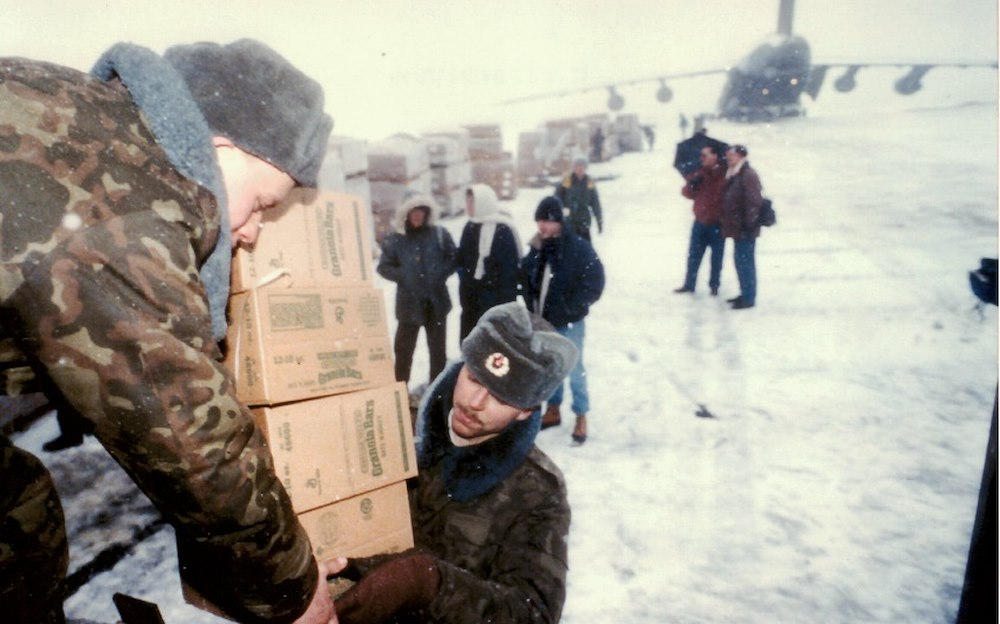

The operation was announced by Secretary of State James A. Baker, III on January 22–23, 1992 and the initial shipment of supplies was sent on February 10, 1992. Twelve US Air Force C-5 and C-141 was carrying an estimated 500 tons of bulk-food rations and medicines into Moscow, Saint Petersburg, Kyiv, Minsk, and Chișinău from Germany and Yerevan, Almaty, Dushanbe, Ashkhabad, Baku, Tashkent, and Bishkek from Turkey. In total, for nearly two weeks sixty-five missions flew 2,363 short tons (2,144 t) of food and medical supplies to 24 locations in the Commonwealth of Independent States during the initial phase of operation. Much of these supplies were left over from the buildup to the Persian Gulf War.

Small teams of US personnel from various government agencies (On-Site Inspection Agency, USAID, and USDA) had been placed in each destination shortly before the deliveries, to coordinate with local officials and to monitor to the best extent possible that the deliveries reached the intended recipients (i.e., orphanages, hospitals, soup kitchens, and needy families).

Following the initial shipment, Phase II of the operation began, consisting of continuing support of the former Soviet republics. Food and medical supplies were shipped by sea, land, and air from Europe. In all, 25,000 short tons of food and medicine were sent to 33 cities in the former Soviet Union. The final stage of the operation was to build, staff, and train hospitals throughout the former Soviet Union.

The operation concluded in September 1994.
