= 107th Tactical Fighter Wing =

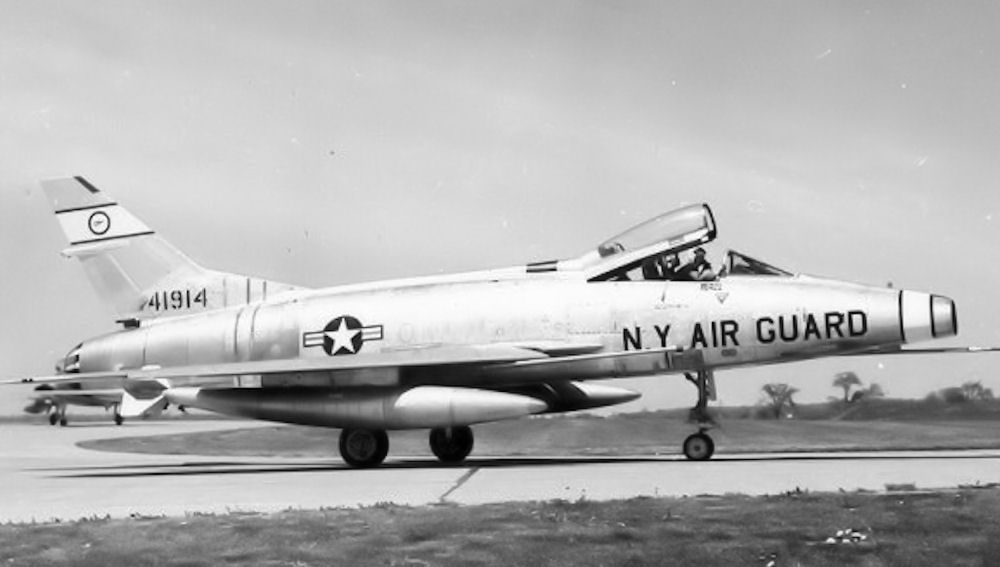
- F-100 of the wing's 136th Tactical Fighter Squadron (Note: Aircraft is North American F-100C-20-NA Super Sabre, serial 54-1914.)
- Active: 1950–1964
- Country: United States
- Allegiance: New York
- Branch: Air National Guard
- Type: Wing
- Role: Tactical fighter
- Part of: New York Air National Guard
- Garrison/HQ: Niagara Falls Municipal Airport, New York
- Motto: Strength Through Alertness

Insignia
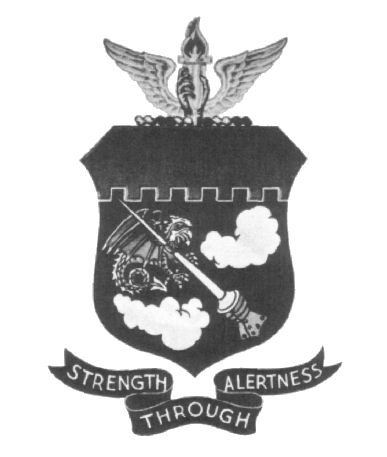
- 107th Tactical Fighter Wing emblem (Note: Approved 30 Ju1y 1954. Description: Per fess enhanced embattled light blue and azure (dark blue) fimbriated argent in sinister base a mailed fist proper grasping a lance bendwise or, enfiling a cockatrice proper (light green) armed, combed wattled and scaled or, all between two clouds of the third [color]. Crest: A dexter hand proper, grasping a winged torch or, flamed proper above a wreath of the colors, argent and azure.)

The 107th Tactical Fighter Wing is an inactive United States Air Force Unit. It was activated in 1950, when the National Guard reorganized its operational groups inder the Wing Base organization. It served in an air defense role until 1958, when it became a fighter bomber unit. It diminished in size during the 1960s, and was inactivated in 1964 when its remaining operational group was reassigned.

== History ==
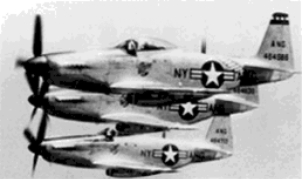
Wing F-51Hs in flight

In the fall of 1950, the National Guard adopted the Wing Base organization system used by the regular Air Force since 1947. This system combined operational groups and the units supporting them under a single wing. As part of this reorganization, the 107th Fighter Wing was organized at Niagara Falls Municipal Airport, New York as the headquarters for the 107th Fighter Group of the New York National Guard.

The wing had an air defense mission, and in October 1952 was redesignated the 107th Fighter-Interceptor Wing. It was initially equipped with World War II era Republic F-47D Thunderbolts and North American F-51H Mustangs. In 1954, it received its first radar equipped Lockheed F-94B Starfires.

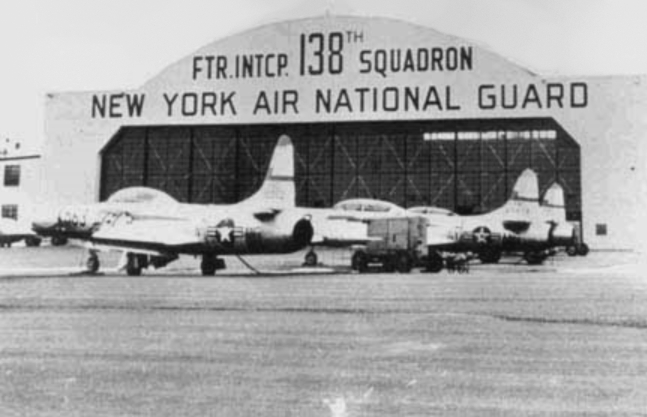
F-94s of the wing's 138th Fighter-Interceptor Squadron

Since 1953, Air Defense Command had organized its dispersed fighter interceptor squadrons into groups that included the support elements for the squadrons. In 1956, the wing became the 107th Air Defense Wing and added the 105th Fighter Group (Air Defense) at Westchester County Airport and the 109th Fighter Group (Air Defense) at Schenectady Airport to the 107th Fighter Group. For a brief time in 1958, the 111th Fighter Group was also assigned to the wing. However, in the fall of 1958 the wing and its original groups began converting to the North American F-86H Sabre and assumed a fighter bomber mission, with the wing becoming the 107th Tactical Fighter Wing.

The wing upgraded to the North American F-100C Super Sabre in 1960, but at the same time began shrinking. In January 1960, the 109th became an air transport group. Then, in February 1961, the 105th became an aeromedical transport group, leaving the wing with a single group, the 107th. In March 1964, the wing was inactivated and its remaining group assigned to the 113th Tactical Fighter Wing.

== Lineage ==
- Established as the 107th Fighter Wing and allotted to the National Guard c. 25 October 1950

Activated and received federal recognition on 1 November 1950
Redesignated 107th Fighter-Interceptor Wing on 1 October 1952
Redesignated 107th Air Defense Wing on 1 May 1956
Redesignated 107th Tactical Fighter Wing on 10 November 1958
Inactivated on 30 March 1964

=== Components ===
Operational groups

- 105th Fighter Group (Air Defense) (Later 105th Tactical Fighter Group), 1 May 1956 – 1 February 1961
- 107th Fighter Group (later 107th Fighter-Interceptor Group, 107th Fighter Group (Air Defense), 107th Tactical Fighter Group), 1 May 1956 – 30 March 1964
- 109th Fighter Group (Air Defense) (later 109th Tactical Fighter Group), 1 May 1956 – 2 January 1960
- 111th Fighter Group (Air Defense), 1 April 1958– 1 November 1958

Support groups

- 107th Air Base Group, 1 November 1950 – 1 May 1956, 1 November 1958 – 15 October 1962
- 107th Maintenance and Supply Group, 1 November 1950 – 1 May 1956
- 107th Medical Group (laer 107th Tactical Hospital), 1 November 1950 – 1 May 1956
- 107th Consolidated Aircraft Maintenance Squadron, 1 November 1958 – 15 October 1962

=== Assignments ===
- New York Air National Guard, 1 November 1950 – 30 March 1964

=== Stations ===
- Niagara Falls Municipal Airport, New York, 1 November 1950 – 30 March 1964

=== Aircraft ===
- Republic F-47 Thunderbolt, 1950-1952
- North American F-51H Mustang, 1952-1954
- Lockheed F-94B Starfire, 1954-1957
- North American F-86H Sabre, 1957-1960
- North American F-100C Super Sabre, 1960-1964

== Notes ==
Explanatory notes

Citations

=== Bibliography ===
- Maurer, Maurer, ed. (1983) [1961]. Air Force Combat Units of World War II (PDF) (reprint ed.). Washington, DC: Office of Air Force History. ISBN 0-912799-02-1. LCCN 61060979. Archived from the original (PDF) on 9 June 2011.
