= Charles F. Carey Jr. =

United States Army soldier

- Born: December 23, 1915; Canadian, Oklahoma, US
- Died: January 9, 1945 (aged 29); Rimling, France
- Burial place: Ardennes American Cemetery Neupré, Belgium
- Military career
- Allegiance: United States of America
- Branch: United States Army
- Rank: Technical Sergeant
- Units: 397th Infantry Regiment, 100th Infantry Division
- Conflicts: World War II
- Awards: Medal of Honor; Bronze Star (2); Purple Heart

Charles F. Carey Jr. (December 23, 1915 – January 9, 1945) was a United States Army soldier and a recipient of the United States military's highest decoration—the Medal of Honor—for his actions in World War II.

== Biography ==
Carey joined the Army from Cheyenne, Wyoming, and by January 8, 1945, was serving as a technical sergeant in the 397th Infantry Regiment, 100th Infantry Division. During a German attack on that day and the following day, in Rimling, France, he organized and led a series of patrols against the enemy forces. With his patrols, he rescued American soldiers who had been attacked or surrounded, captured a house and sixteen prisoners, and disabled an enemy tank. He was killed by a sniper later in the day on January 9. For these actions, he was posthumously awarded the Medal of Honor six months later in July 1945.

Carey was buried at the Ardennes American Cemetery in Neupré, Belgium.

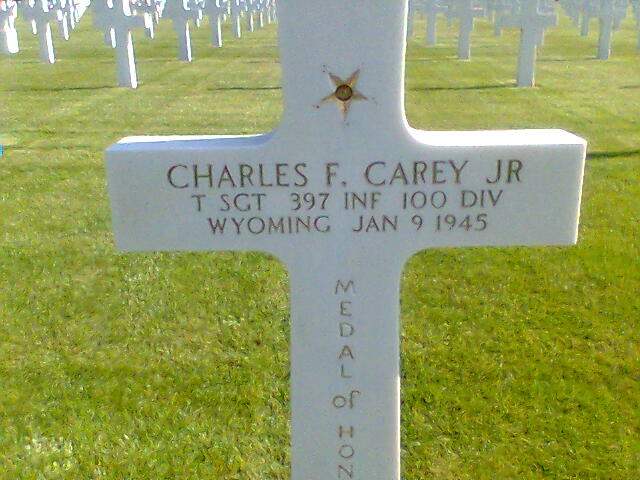
Gravestone of Charles F. Carey Jr.

== Medal of Honor citation ==
Technical Sergeant Carey's official Medal of Honor citation reads:

He was in command of an antitank platoon when about 200 enemy infantrymen and 12 tanks attacked his battalion, overrunning part of its position. After losing his guns, T/Sgt. Carey, acting entirely on his own initiative, organized a patrol and rescued 2 of his squads from a threatened sector, evacuating those who had been wounded. He organized a second patrol and advanced against an enemy-held house from which vicious fire issued, preventing the free movement of our troops. Covered by fire from his patrol, he approached the house, killed 2 snipers with his rifle, and threw a grenade in the door. He entered alone and a few minutes later emerged with 16 prisoners. Acting on information he furnished, the American forces were able to capture an additional 41 Germans in adjacent houses. He assembled another patrol, and, under covering fire, moved to within a few yards of an enemy tank and damaged it with a rocket. As the crew attempted to leave their burning vehicle, he calmly shot them with his rifle, killing 3 and wounding a fourth. Early in the morning of January 9, German infantry moved into the western part of the town and encircled a house in which T/Sgt. Carey had previously posted a squad. Four of the group escaped to the attic. By maneuvering an old staircase against the building, T/Sgt. Carey was able to rescue these men. Later that day, when attempting to reach an outpost, he was struck down by sniper fire. The fearless and aggressive leadership of T/Sgt. Carey, his courage in the face of heavy fire from superior enemy forces, provided an inspiring example for his comrades and materially helped his battalion to withstand the German onslaught.

== See also ==
- List of Medal of Honor recipients
- List of Medal of Honor recipients for World War II
