= Donald A. Larson =

American fighter ace

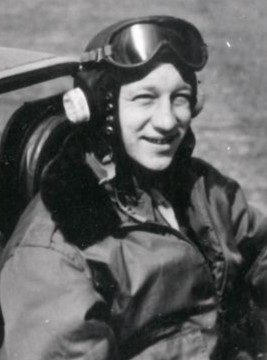
- Born: 2 April 1915; Yakima, Washington, United States
- Died: 4 August 1944 (aged 29) near Uelzen, Nazi Germany
- Burial place: Ardennes American Cemetery and Memorial, Belgium
- Military career
- Allegiance: United States
- Branch: United States Army Air Forces
- Rank: Major
- Service number: O-431891
- Units: 339th Bomb Group; 339th Fighter Group; 505th Fighter Squadron
- Conflicts: World War II
- Awards: Silver Star; Distinguished Flying Cross (2); Air Medal (4); Purple Heart
- Memorials: Larson Air Force Base

Donald A. Larson (2 April 1915 or 1917 – 4 August 1944) was an American fighter pilot and World War II flying ace from Yakima, Washington. He attained to the rank of major in the United States Army Air Forces while serving with 505th Fighter Squadron, 339th Fighter Group. Larson Air Force Base in Moses Lake was named after him.

== Early life ==
Larson and his identical twin brother Ronald were born in Yakima, Washington, on 2 April 1915. His parents were Alvin N. Larson and Anna D. Larson. He took flying lessons at McAllister Flying School at McAllister Field in Yakima in 1928.

== Military career ==
Larson enlisted as an Air Cadet at McChord Field, Tacoma, Washington, in April or May 1941, where he received his flight training, and continued as a flight instructor. He was assigned to the 339th Bomb Group in 1943. That year, the 339th Bomb Group was moved from Hunter Army Air Field in Georgia to Walterboro Army Air Field in South Carolina, where they flew reconfigured P-39s in as fighter-bombers. Larson went with the 339th as it was moved to Fowlmere, England in April 1944, and began flying P-51s. He was later posted to the 505th Fighter Squadron as a combat pilot.

On 13 May 1944, he shot down his first enemy aircraft, and earned a promotion to major. Only 11 days later, on 24 May, he shot down an additional three aircraft. He earned the ace designation by shooting down his fifth enemy aircraft on 25 July 1944, becoming one of eight aces at RAF Fowlmere.

During his career, he flew three different aircraft in combat missions: P-51B #42-1066646, P-51D #42-106819 (which he named "Mary Queen of Scotts" after his girlfriend, Mary Scott), and a P-51D #44-13881 or #13889 (also named Mary, Queen of Scotts), which he was flying when he died.

Major Larson commanded an Eighth Air Force fighter squadron. An article dated 7 August 1944 (three days after Larson's death) said that the squadron had claimed "the destruction of 103 enemy planes in 100 missions—54 in the air and the rest aground." The Daily Record continued: "It also claims two enemy planes probably destroyed and 22 damaged."

== Death and burial ==
On 4 August 1944, Larson was on a fighter sweep, and shot down his fifth and sixth enemy aircraft. His P-51D Mustang was also shot down and crashed near Uelzen, Germany. He had flown 57 combat missions. According to some sources, he had destroyed 12 enemy aircraft in his career. His body was initially recovered by enemy forces and buried near Uelzen. After his grave was discovered, his remains were re-interred at the Ardennes American Cemetery and Memorial at Neuville-en-Condroz, Neupré, Wallonia, Belgium, nine miles southwest of Liège. His grave is in Plot D, Row 11, Grave 9.

== Aerial victory credits ==
Date	#	Type	Location	Aircraft flown	Unit Assigned
May 24, 1944	2; 1	Messerschmitt Bf 109; Focke-Wulf Fw 190	Berlin, Germany	P-51B Mustang	505 FS, 339 FG
July 28, 1944	1	Junkers Ju 52	Neustadt am Main, Germany	P-51D Mustang	505 FS, 339 FG
August 4, 1944	2	Bf 109	Uelzen, Germany	P-51D	505 FS, 339 FG

SOURCES: Air Force Historical Study 85: USAF Credits for the Destruction of Enemy Aircraft, World War II

== Awards and honors ==
According to U.S. Representative Hal Holmes of Ellensburg, Major Larson had "been awarded almost all the medals the air force gives". His awards included:

- Silver Star
- Distinguished Flying Cross with Oak Leaf Cluster
- Air Medal with three clusters (Note: Fields of Honor and Faces Beyond the Graves only list 2 clusters on the Air Medal. These sources also only list the Air Medal, Silver Star and Distinguished Flying Cross with Oak Cluster.)
- Purple Heart
- American Defense Service Medal
- European-African-Middle Eastern Campaign Medal with two Bronze Stars
- American Campaign Medal
- World War II Victory Medal

The Air Force undertook a memorialization program to rename many bases in honor of local war heroes. Moses Lake Army Air Base, which operated from 1942 to 1945, reopened on 26 November 1948 and was renamed to Larson Air Force Base in May 1950 in his honor.

Although the Air Force base was closed down, the section of Moses Lake North that comprises the former base housing continues to be known as the Larson community.
