= Leroy A. Schreiber =

American flying ace (1917-1944)

Leroy Adolph Schreiber
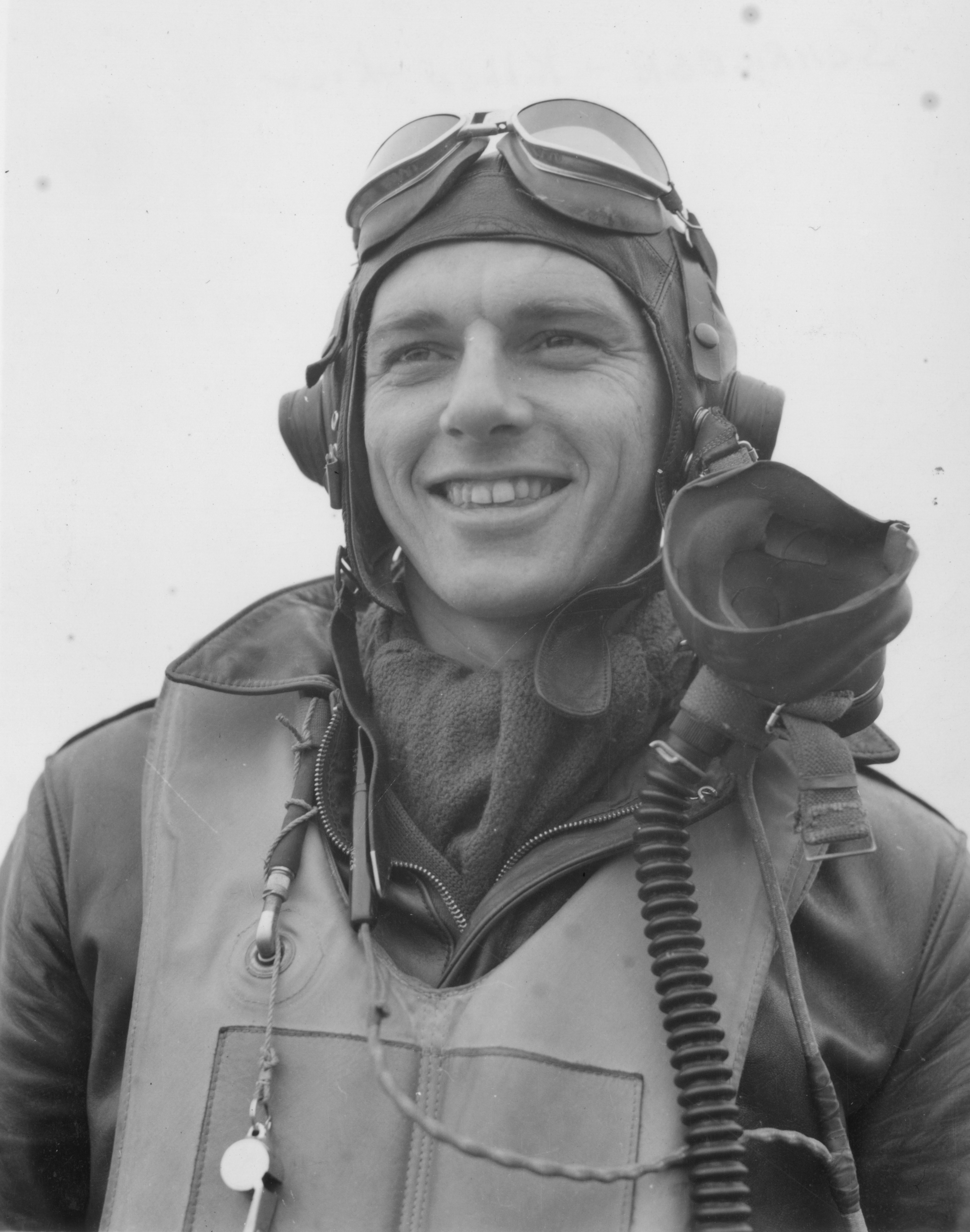
- Born: December 13, 1917; Plymouth, Massachusetts, U.S.
- Died: April 15, 1944 (aged 26) †; Flensburg, Germany
- Burial place: Ardennes American Cemetery and Memorial; Neupré, Belgium
- Military career
- Allegiance: United States
- Branch: United States Army Air Forces
- Service years: 1941–1944
- Rank: Major
- Unit: 56th Fighter Group
- Commands: 62nd Fighter Squadron
- Conflicts: World War II
- Awards: Distinguished Service Cross; Distinguished Flying Cross (5); Purple Heart; Air Medal (4)

Leroy Adolph Schreiber (December 13, 1917 – April 15, 1944) was a fighter ace in the United States Army Air Forces. During World War II, he was credited in destroying 12 enemy airplanes, before being killed in action in April 1944.

== Early life ==
Schreiber was born on 1917 in Plymouth, Massachusetts. He attended Harvard University and graduated in 1939 with a major in mathematics.

== Military career ==
In 1940, Schreiber entered the Aviation Cadet Program of the United States Army Air Corps and in 1941, he was commissioned as second lieutenant along with pilot wings. Following his pilot training, he was assigned as an instructor pilot and his first attempts to enter combat rejected. On 1943, during an aviation cadet graduation ceremony, Schreiber and other instructor pilots flew very low ("buzzed") over a local town. As a result, his commanding officer assigned him for combat in the overseas.

=== World War II ===
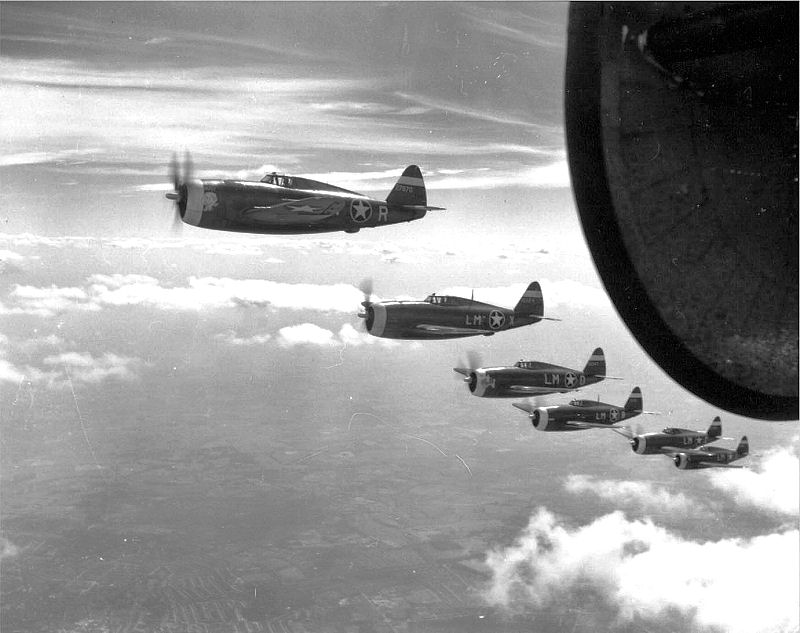
62d Fighter Squadron P-47 Thunderbolts on an escort mission

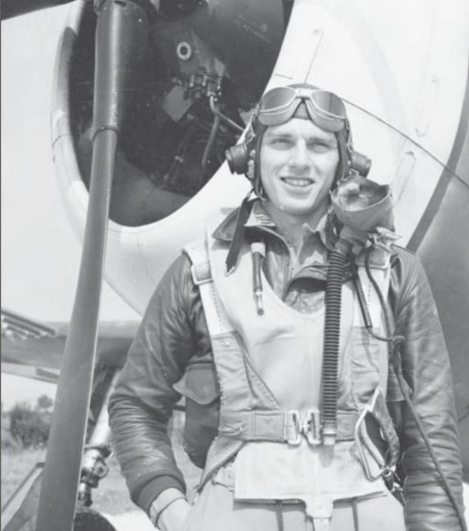
Schreiber with his P-47

After completing transition training in the P-47 Thunderbolt, he was assigned to the 61st Fighter Squadron of the 56th Fighter Group at RAF Halesworth in England in July 1943.

Schreiber flew his first two missions and on July 30, 1943, he took part in a bomber escort of B-17 Flying Fortresses targeting factories in Kassel, Germany. Over Netherlands, the 61st FS and 62d Fighter Squadron of the 56th Fighter Group escorted the bombers back to home base in England. During the escort, the P-47s encountered a formation of Messerschmitt Bf 109s. Schreiber shot down a Bf 109 that was attacking the P-47 flown by Lt. Milton Anderson. Schreiber also claimed a probable destruction of another Bf 109 during the aerial combat which was upgraded to confirmed aerial victory after his gun camera footage of the combat was reassessed, crediting him with his first two aerial victories.

In August 1943, he was appointed as commander of the 62d Fighter Squadron. On August 24, 1943, he shot down a Focke-Wulf Fw 190 south of Paris, France, his third aerial victory. By the end of 1943, Schreiber shot down two more enemy airplanes, including one shared destruction. On February 20, 1944, during a fighter escort for bombers attacking targets at Brunswick-Leipzig region, Schreiber shot down three Bf 109s over Steinhuder Lake, bringing his total aerial victories to seven and earning the title of flying ace. For his heroism in the mission, he received the Distinguished Service Cross.

On February 22, 1944, he was credited with another shared destruction of enemy aircraft. On March 8, he shot down a Fw 190 and Bf 109 over Steinhuder Lake. On March 16, while leading his squadron in a protection cover for bombers at the vicinity of Saint Dizier, France, he intercepted and shot down a Bf 109 and shared in the destruction of a Fw 190.

On April 9, he was credited with a shared destruction of a Bf 109, his last aerial victory of the war. During the war, while flying a total of 140 missions, Schreiber was credited with the destruction of 12 enemy aircraft in aerial combat plus 4 shared destruction, 1 probable, 6 damaged, and 2 destroyed on the ground while strafing enemy airfields.

=== Death ===
On April 15, 1944, Schreiber was killed after being shot down by anti-aircraft fire while attacking a German airfield in Flensburg, Germany. He was buried at the Ardennes American Cemetery and Memorial in Neupré, Belgium.

== Aerial victory credits ==
Chronicle of aerial victories
Date	#	Type	Location	Aircraft flown	Unit Assigned
July 30, 1943	2	Messerschmitt Bf 109	Arnhem, Netherlands	P-47D Thunderbolt	61 FS, 56 FG
August 24, 1943	1	Focke-Wulf Fw 190	Paris, France	P-47D	62 FS, 56 FG
October 8, 1943	1	Fw 190	Quakenbrück, Germany	P-47D	62 FS, 56 FG
November 29, 1943	0.5	Messerschmitt Me 210	Oldenburg, Germany	P-47D	62 FS, 56 FG
February 20, 1944	3	Bf 109	Steinhuder Lake, Germany	P-47D	62 FS, 56 FG
February 22, 1944	0.5	Bf 109	Breda, Netherlands	P-47D	62 FS, 56 FG
March 8, 1944	1; 1	Fw 190; Bf 109	Steinhuder Lake, Germany	P-47D	62 FS, 56 FG
March 16, 1944	1; 0.5	Bf 109; Fw 190	Saint Dizier, France	P-47D	62 FS, 56 FG
April 9, 1944	0.5	Fw 190	Lübeck, Germany	P-47D	62 FS, 56 FG

SOURCES: Air Force Historical Study 85: USAF Credits for the Destruction of Enemy Aircraft, World War II

== Awards and decorations ==

USAAF Pilot Badge
Distinguished Service Cross	Distinguished Flying Cross with four bronze oak leaf clusters	Purple Heart
Air Medal with three bronze oak leaf clusters	American Defense Service Medal	American Campaign Medal
European–African–Middle Eastern Campaign Medal with three bronze campaign stars	World War II Victory Medal	Croix de Guerre with silver star (étoile en argent) (France)

Army Presidential Unit Citation

=== Distinguished Service Cross citation ===

Schreiber, Leroy A.
Major (Air Corps), U.S. Army Air Forces
62d Fighter Squadron, 56th Fighter Group, Eighth Air Force
Date of Action: February 20, 1944

Citation:

The President of the United States of America, authorized by Act of Congress July 9, 1918, takes pleasure in presenting the Distinguished Service Cross to Captain (Air Corps) Leroy Adolph Schreiber, United States Army Air Forces, for extraordinary heroism in connection with military operations against an armed enemy while serving as Pilot of a P-47 Fighter Airplane in the 62d Fighter Squadron, 56th Fighter Group, Eighth Air Force, in aerial combat against enemy forces on 20 February 1944, in the European Theater of Operations. On this date as Captain Schreiber shot down three enemy aircraft in a single engagement. Captain Schreiber's unquestionable valor in aerial combat is in keeping with the highest traditions of the military service and reflects great credit upon himself, the 8th Air Force, and the United States Army Air Forces.

== Bibliography ==
- Cleaver, Thomas McKelvey (2023). Clean Sweep: VIII Fighter Command against the Luftwaffe, 1942–45 (Hardcover). Bloomsbury Publishing. ISBN 9781472855473.
- Hammel, Eric (2020). Air War Europa Chronology: America's Air War Against Germany In Europe and North Africa 1942-1945 (Hardcover). ISBN 9780935553079.
- Hess, William N. (2012). 'Down to Earth' Strafing Aces of the Eighth Air Force (Hardcover). Bloomsbury Publishing. ISBN 9781782008897.
- Freeman, Roger W. (2009). Wolfpack Warriors: The Story of World War II's Most Successful Fighter Outfit (Hardcover). Stackpole Books. ISBN 9781461752134.
