= William E. Bryan Jr. =

Major General in the United States Air Force

William Elmer Bryan Jr.
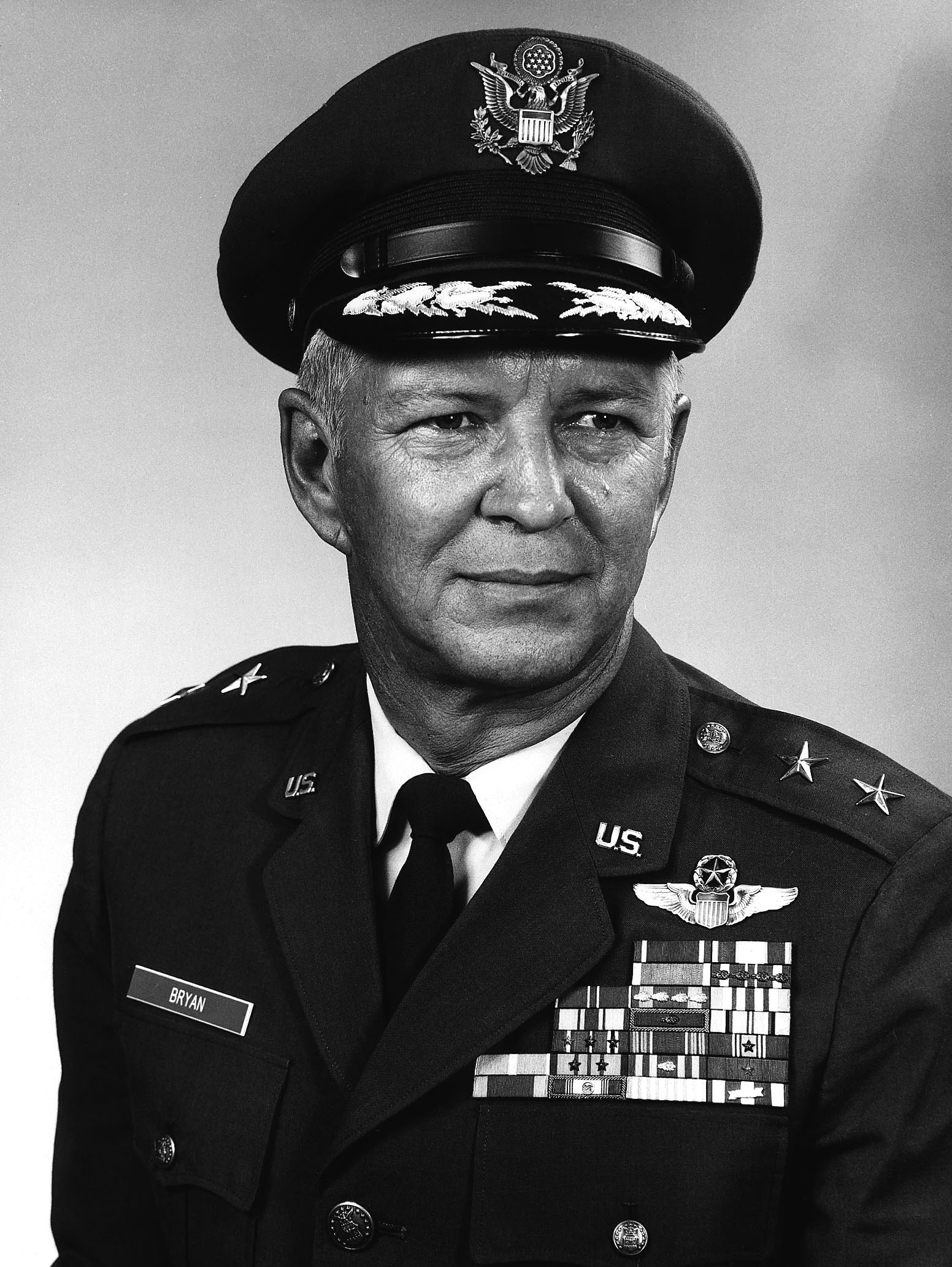
- Born: October 5, 1921; Flint, Michigan, U.S.
- Died: April 6, 2008 (aged 86); Ocean Springs, Mississippi, U.S.
- Burial place: Arlington National Cemetery
- Military career
- Allegiance: United States
- Branch: United States Air Force
- Service years: 1942–1974
- Rank: Major General
- Nickname: 'Bill'
- Units: 339th Fighter Group; 18th Fighter Bomber Wing
- Commands: Air Force Fighter Weapons School; 4520th Combat Crew Training Wing; 4th Tactical Fighter Wing; 831st Air Division; Nineteenth Air Force
- Conflicts: World War II; Korean War; Vietnam War
- Awards: Distinguished Service Cross; Air Force Distinguished Service Medal (2); Legion of Merit; Distinguished Flying Cross (5); Bronze Star Medal; Air Medal (24)

William Elmer Bryan Jr. (October 5, 1921 - April 6, 2008) was a United States Air Force Major General and a flying ace. Bryan flew combined total of 235 combat missions in World War II and Korean War, and was credited in destroying 7.5 enemy aircraft in aerial combat during World War II. He retired in 1974, after 33 years of distinguished service.

== Early life ==
Bryan was born on October 5, 1921, in Flint, Michigan. He graduated from Flint High School in 1939.

== Military career ==
He enlisted in the Aviation Cadet Program of the U.S. Army Air Corps on March 27, 1942, and was commissioned as second lieutenant in the U.S. Army Air Forces and awarded his pilot wings on February 6, 1943, at Luke Field, Arizona.

=== World War II ===
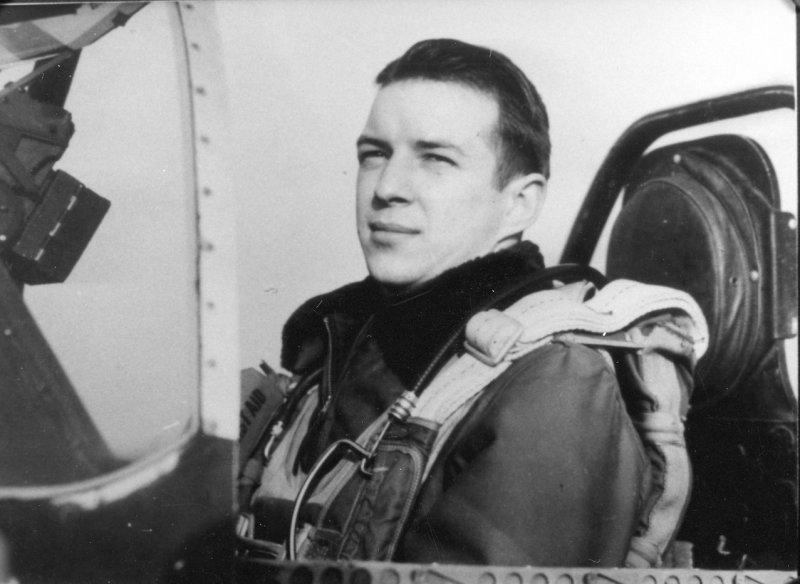
Bryan in his P-51 Mustang during World War II

On August 9, 1943, Bryan was promoted to first lieutenant. In March 1944, he was assigned to the 504th Fighter Squadron of the 339th Fighter Group in the European Theater of Operations. Based at RAF Fowlmere, he flew missions in the North American P-51 Mustang.

Bryan was credited with a shared aerial victory of a Focke-Wulf Fw 190 over Dannenberg, Germany on May 24, 1944. He was credited with his first solo aerial victories on May 30, when he shot down two Fw 190s over Magdeburg, Germany. Scoring additional aerial victories, he finally became a flying ace on December 31, 1944, when he shot down a Fw 190, his fifth aerial victory, over Hamburg, Germany. Bryan scored his final aerial victories (sixth and seventh aerial victories) on March 2, 1945, over Magdeburg.

During World War II, Bryan was credited with the destruction of 7.5 enemy aircraft in aerial combat plus 1 probable, and 1 destroyed on the ground while strafing enemy airfields. Ranking him as top scoring ace of the 339th FG, he flew an unnamed P-51B and P-51D bearing the name "Big Noise". He flew a total of 114 missions, and was awarded four Distinguished Flying Crosses and fifteen Air Medals during the war.

=== Post war ===
At the end of the war in December 1945, Bryan returned to the United States. He served at Headquarters of the Tactical Air Command at Langley Air Force Base in Virginia, and then as an advisor to Air National Guard fighter squadrons in Minnesota and South Dakota. In August 1949 he was assigned as operations and training officer for an Air Force Reserve wing at Scott Air Force Base in Illinois.

=== Korean War ===
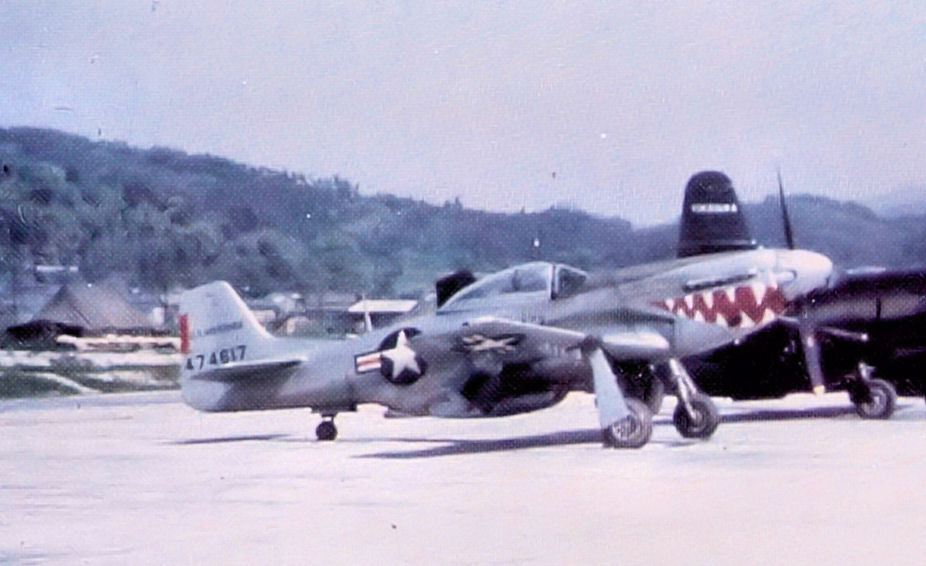
F-51D Mustang of 12th FBS in South Korea

During the Korean War, Bryan flew missions in the F-51 Mustang with the 12th Fighter-Bomber Squadron of the 18th Fighter Bomber Wing in South Korea from August 1950 to April 1951. Flying 121 missions, he was awarded the Distinguished Service Cross for leading attacks against enemy transportation facilities and materiel on the time period of February 1 to February 21, 1951, during which his squadron was able to locate 466 enemy vehicles of which 389 were totally destroyed and the remainder severely damaged. Along with his Distinguished Service Cross, Bryan was also awarded a Distinguished Flying Cross, Bronze Star Medal and nine Air Medals during the war.

=== Post war ===
After returning from Korea in April 1951, Bryan was assigned to Headquarters Tactical Air Command with duties involving joint air-ground tactical doctrine under the Deputy Chief of Staff for Operations. He attended the Armed Forces Staff College in Norfolk, Virginia, from January 1955 to June 1955 and then was assigned to Headquarters U.S. Air Force in the Pentagon with the Tactical Fighter Branch in the Directorate of Requirements.

From August 1959 to August 1962, Bryan served as chief, Air Offense Division, at Headquarters of the U.S. Air Forces in Europe, in Wiesbaden, Germany. On his return to the United States, he attended the National War College, Washington, D.C. After graduation in July 1963, he was assigned to Nellis Air Force Base in Nevada, as commandant of the Air Force Fighter Weapons School and later as vice commander of the 4520th Combat Crew Training Wing.

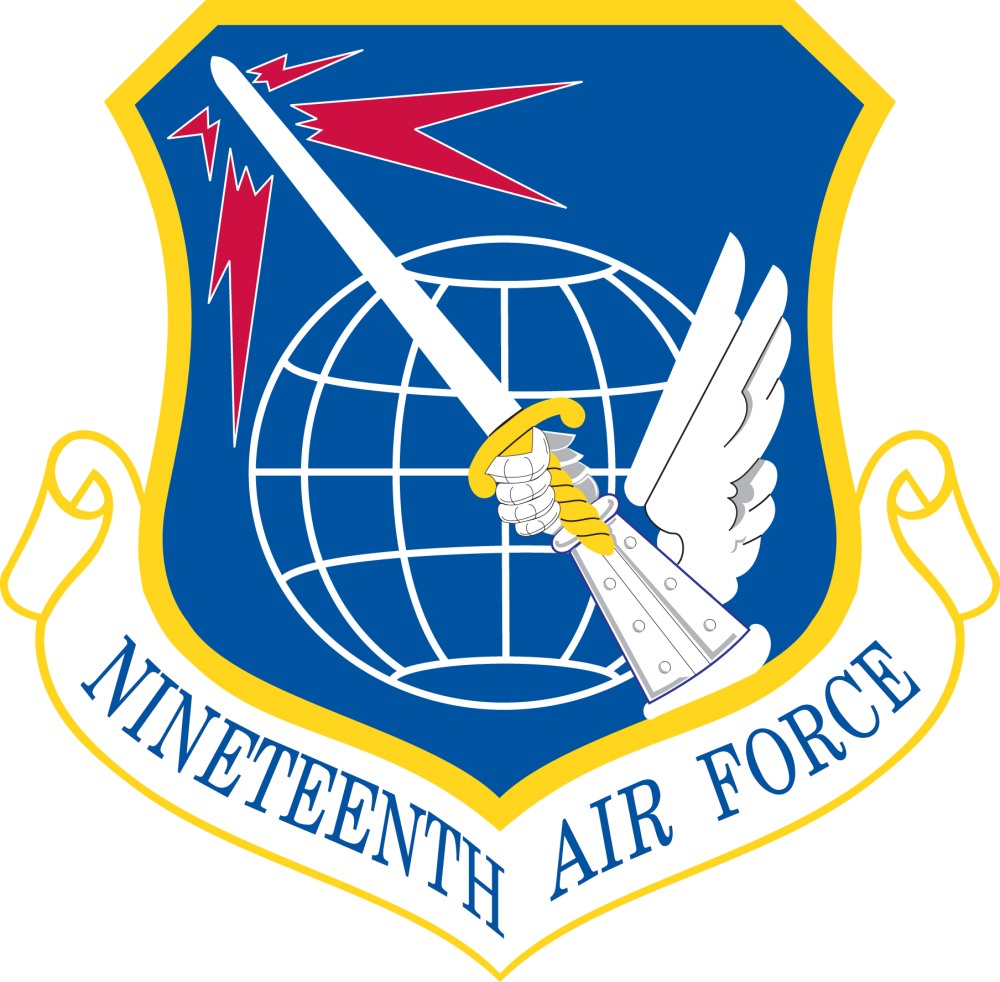
Nineteenth Air Force

Bryan was commander of the 4th Tactical Fighter Wing at Seymour Johnson Air Force Base in North Carolina, from January 1965 until January 1966, when he assumed duties as commander of the 831st Air Division, George Air Force Base, California. During the Vietnam War, Bryan was assigned as deputy chief of staff, U.S. Military Assistance Command, Vietnam in November 1967. According to his recollections, he flew a single mission during the war from a USAF air base in Thailand to North Vietnam.

In June 1969 he returned to the United States and was assigned as chief of staff for Headquarters of the Tactical Air Command at Langley Air Force Base in Virginia. In December 1970, Bryan assumed duties as commander of the Nineteenth Air Force, Tactical Air Command, with headquarters at Seymour Johnson Air Force Base in North Carolina. His final assignment was with Allied Forces Central Europe headquarters in July 1972 with duties as deputy chief of staff for operations and intelligence and as senior U.S. representative to the headquarters.

Bryan retired from the Air Force on June 1, 1974.

== Later life ==
Bryan and his wife Olive had four children. After his retirement, the family moved to Ocean Springs, Mississippi. Olive died on 2005.

Bryan died on April 6, 2008, at the age of 86. He was cremated, and his and his wife's ashes were interred at Arlington National Cemetery.

== Aerial victory credits ==
Date	#	Type	Location	Aircraft flown	Unit Assigned
May 24, 1944	0.5	Focke-Wulf Fw 190	Dannenberg, Germany	P-51B Mustang	503 FS, 339 FG
May 30, 1944	2	Fw 190	Magdeburg, Germany	P-51B	503 FS, 339 FG
June 21, 1944	1	Messerschmitt Me 410	Stettin, Germany	P-51B	503 FS, 339 FG
August 5, 1944	1	Fw 190	Hameln, Germany	P-51D Mustang	503 FS, 339 FG
December 31, 1944	1	Fw 190	Hamburg, Germany	P-51D	503 FS, 339 FG
March 2, 1945	1	Fw 190	Magdeburg, Germany	P-51D	503 FS, 339 FG
March 2, 1945	1	Messerschmitt Bf 109	Magdeburg, Germany	P-51D	503 FS, 339 FG

SOURCES: Air Force Historical Study 85: USAF Credits for the Destruction of Enemy Aircraft, World War II

== Awards and decorations ==
General Bryan is a command pilot with more than 5,000 hours of flying time. His military decorations and awards include the Distinguished Service Cross, Distinguished Service Medal, Legion of Merit, Distinguished Flying Cross with four oak leaf clusters, Bronze Star Medal, and Air Medal with 23 oak leaf clusters.

USAF Command pilot badge
Distinguished Service Cross
Air Force Distinguished Service Medal with bronze oak leaf cluster
Legion of Merit
Distinguished Flying Cross with "V" device and three bronze oak leaf clusters
Distinguished Flying Cross (second ribbon required for accoutrement spacing)
Bronze Star Medal
Air Medal with four silver oak leaf clusters
Air Medal with two bronze oak leaf clusters (second ribbon required for accoutrement spacing)
Joint Service Commendation Medal
Air Force Commendation Medal
Air Force Presidential Unit Citation with two bronze oak leaf clusters
American Campaign Medal
European-African-Middle Eastern Campaign Medal with one silver and two bronze campaign stars
World War II Victory Medal
National Defense Service Medal with bronze service star
Korean Service Medal with two bronze campaign stars
Vietnam Service Medal with three bronze campaign stars
Air Force Longevity Service Award with one silver and three bronze oak leaf clusters
Small Arms Expert Marksmanship Ribbon
Croix de Guerre with silver star (France)
Republic of Korea Presidential Unit Citation
Republic of Vietnam Gallantry Cross
United Nations Service Medal for Korea
Vietnam Campaign Medal
Korean War Service Medal

=== Distinguished Service Cross ===

Bryan Jr., William E.
Major, U.S. Air Force
12th Fighter-Bomber Squadron, 19th Fighter Bomb Group, 5th Air Force
Date of Action:February 1, 1951 to February 21, 1951

==== Citation ====
The President of the United States of America, authorized by Act of Congress July 9, 1918, takes pleasure in presenting the Distinguished Service Cross (Air Force) to Major William Elmer Bryan, Jr., United States Air Force, for extraordinary heroism in connection with military operations against an armed enemy of the United Nations while serving as Pilot with the 12th Fighter-Bomber Squadron, 19th Fighter Bomb Group, Fifth Air Force, in action against enemy forces in the Republic of Korea during the period 1 through 21 February 1951. Displaying superb leadership, dauntless courage, and exceptional aeronautical skill, Major Bryan led his squadron of F-51 fighter aircraft on attacks against enemy transportation facilities and materiel. With total disregard for his personal safety, and ignoring the perils of enemy anti-aircraft, automatic weapons, and small-arms fire, Major Bryan repeatedly flew over hazardous mountain terrain at low speed and minimum altitude in search of camouflaged enemy vehicles and supplies. During this period, Major Bryan personally succeeded in detecting 82 vehicles which had been cleverly camouflaged by the enemy. Before destroying those targets, he led his flight in low level passes over the areas pointing out the camouflage techniques, and completely disregarded the damage frequently inflicted upon his own aircraft by enemy fire. As a direct result of this valuable instruction in camouflage detection, Major Bryan's squadron was able to locate 466 enemy vehicles of which 389 were totally destroyed and the remainder severely damaged.
