= Grotte de Rosée =

Protected cave in Belgium

Coordinates: 50°34′41″N 5°24′32″E

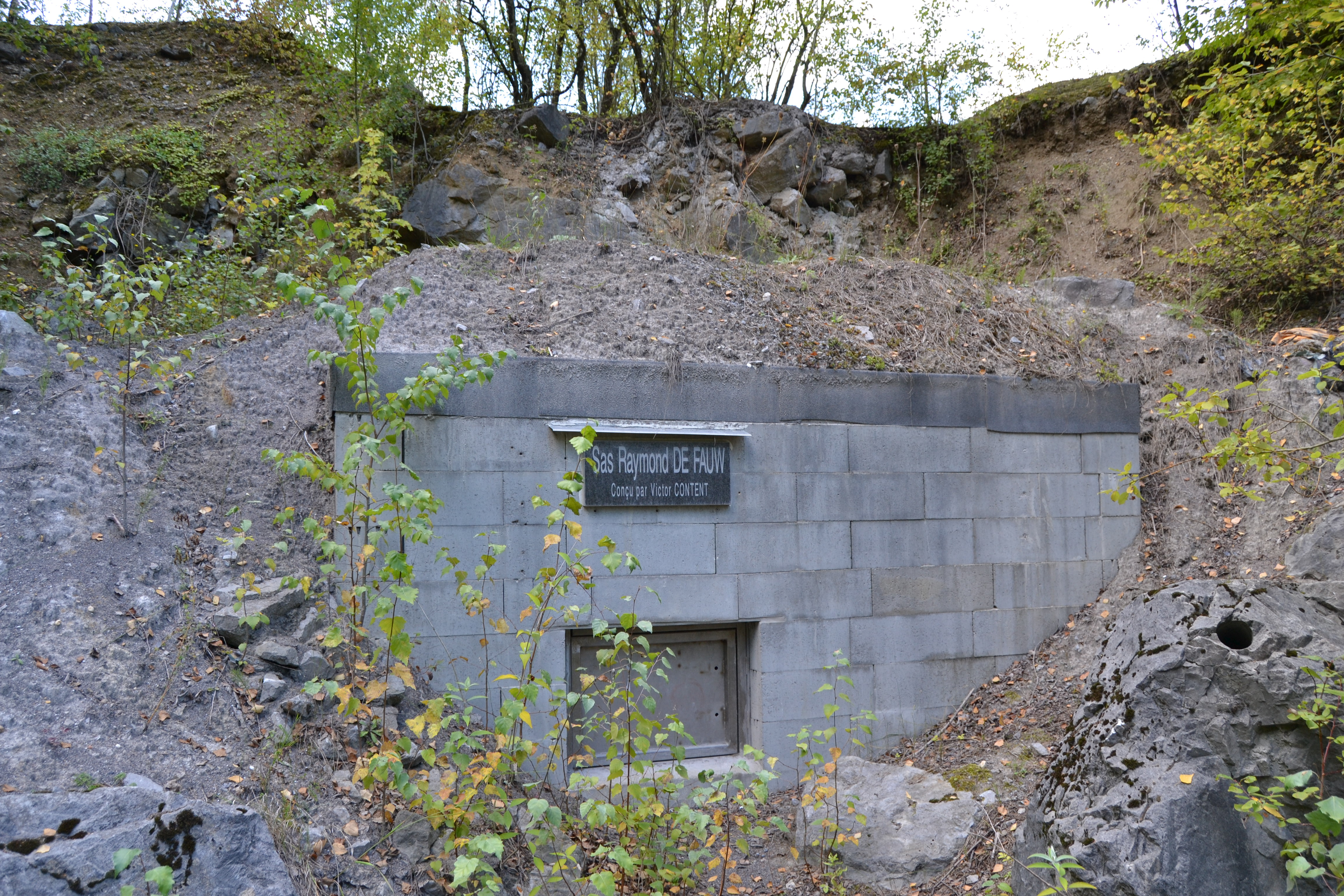
The entrance to the cave

The Grotte de Rosée (Cave of Rosée) is located near Éhein in the municipality of Engis, in Belgium. It has been classified as Wallonia's patrimoine immobilier exceptionnel de la Région wallonne ('exceptional heritage of Wallonia'), and can be visited only by accredited scientists.

It houses a set of concretions which is unique in Belgium.

== Location ==
The cave is located in Éhein, along the valley of the creek Engihoul, bordered by the road "of the 36 turns", in a syncline formed in the limestone of Visean, near carrière du Lion, the "Lion's quarry".

== Discovery and designation ==
The Grotte de Rosée was discovered in July 1906, following a fire pit in a quarry belonging to the baron Jacques de Rosée. Workers then used the cavity, which appeared as a vertical chimney, to pour hundreds of wheelbarrows of rubble into. On 15 September, a serious exploration was initiated by A. Vandebosch, supervisor at Concasseur des Arwis, and his friend Ernest Doudou. At the bottom of the chimney (about 12 feet long), they discovered a huge room, a domain "much more reserved to fairies and sylphs than to be trodden by the brutal foot of man", according to Doudou; they named that room "the Crystal Palace". Based on a proposal by E. Van den Broeck, who soon visited the place, the cave was named by the owner, who in turn allowed researchers to investigate it, and protected access to it.

The exploration proved to dangerous that the workers refused to continue, leaving the work to the scientists Cosyns, Doudou, and Colette.

== Description ==
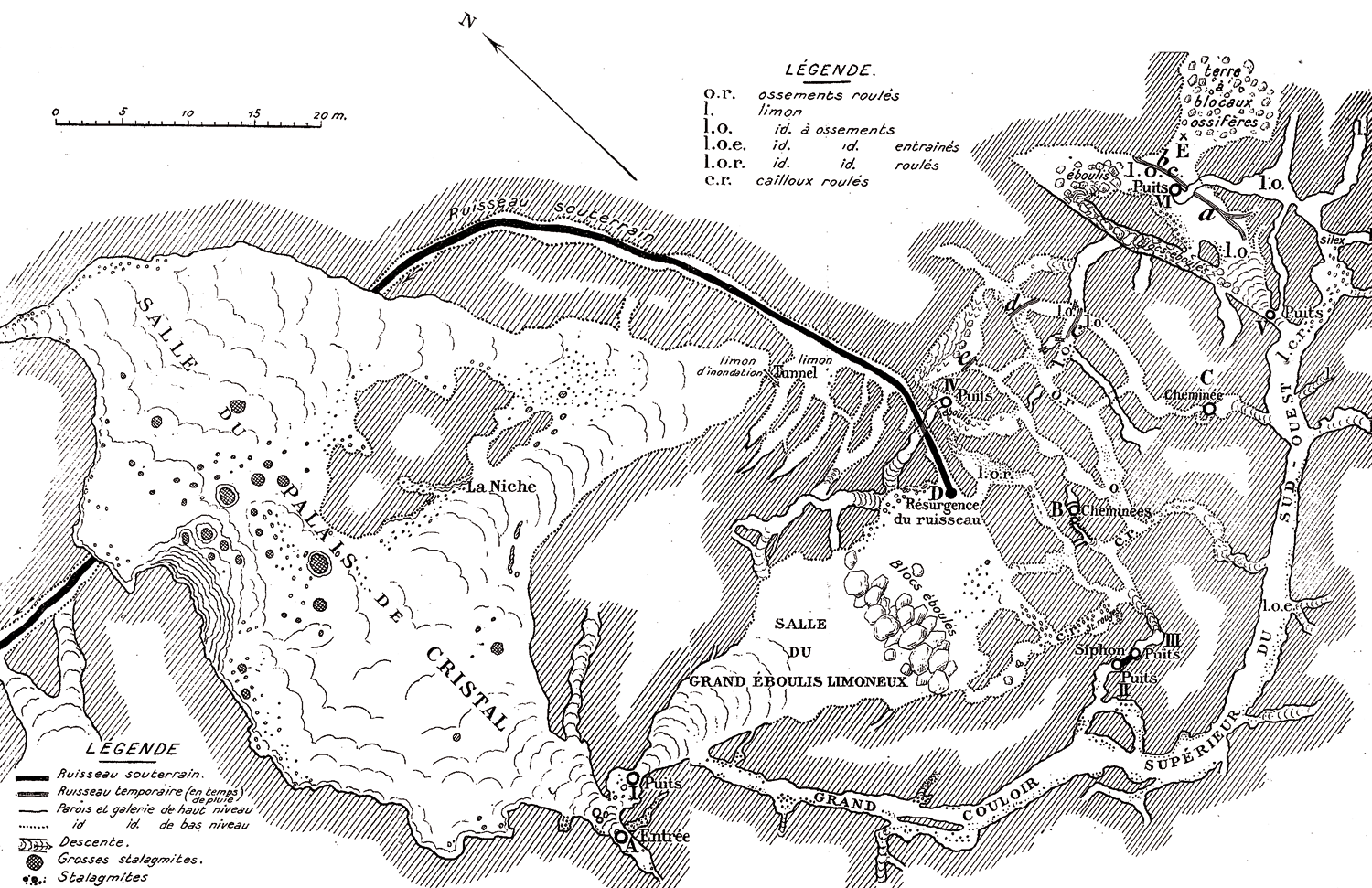
Longitudinal section of the Cave of Rosée, as published in E. Van den Broeck, E.-A. Martel and Ed Rahir, Les cavernes et les rivières souterraines de la Belgique étudiées spécialement dans leurs rapports avec l'hydrologie des calcaires et avec la question des eaux potables, T. II, Les calcaires carbonifériens du bassin de Dinant et coup d'œil sur le bassin de Namur, H. Lamertin, Brussels, 1910.

The Grotte de Rosée consists of a vast network of rooms, corridors and galleries sometimes parallel, sometimes perpendicular, which intersect on several levels, punctuated by wells, chimneys, siphon, tunnels, etc. It is partially covered by an underground stream.

The most impressive room is the Crystal Palace with its giant's kettles and domes, waterfalls stalactites, and stalagmites, the main candle being 2.8 m high with a diameter of 60 cm, snowy regions, and across space a shower of hyaline crystalline tubes, 5 cm diameter for heights ranging from 1 to 2 m and, fistulas, crystal wands all hollow and containing water. Other eccentric crystallization, formed by capillarity in the most diverse forms (draperies, hooks, buckles, screws, etc..). exist in large numbers, reminiscent of the corals or strange flowers. In the second room, there are also quirky and stalactites concretions like swords.

Further west, the cave offers view of stalagmites and draperies red currant and even stalagmites.

== Classification as exceptional heritage ==
The Grotte de Rosée is classified, with the cave Lyell (named after Charles Lyell; both are in fact two parts of the same site), patrimoine immobilier exceptionnel de la Région wallonne (exceptional heritage of Wallonia), under "underground site exceptional," by order of 8 July 1977.

It is accessible only to researchers due to the fragility of many concretions and because the opening to tourists and recreational cavers also would result in a change in the natural balance of the biotope, by changes in temperature and light, trampling of clay and nutrient that benefit some species, taking into account that the study of this fauna is still very little progress in this cave.

== Sources ==
- This page has been initially translated from Grotte de Rosée on the French Wikipedia, under CC-BY-SA license. See the list of authors.
