= John L. Jerstad =

U.S. Army Air Forces Medal of Honor recipient (1918–1943)

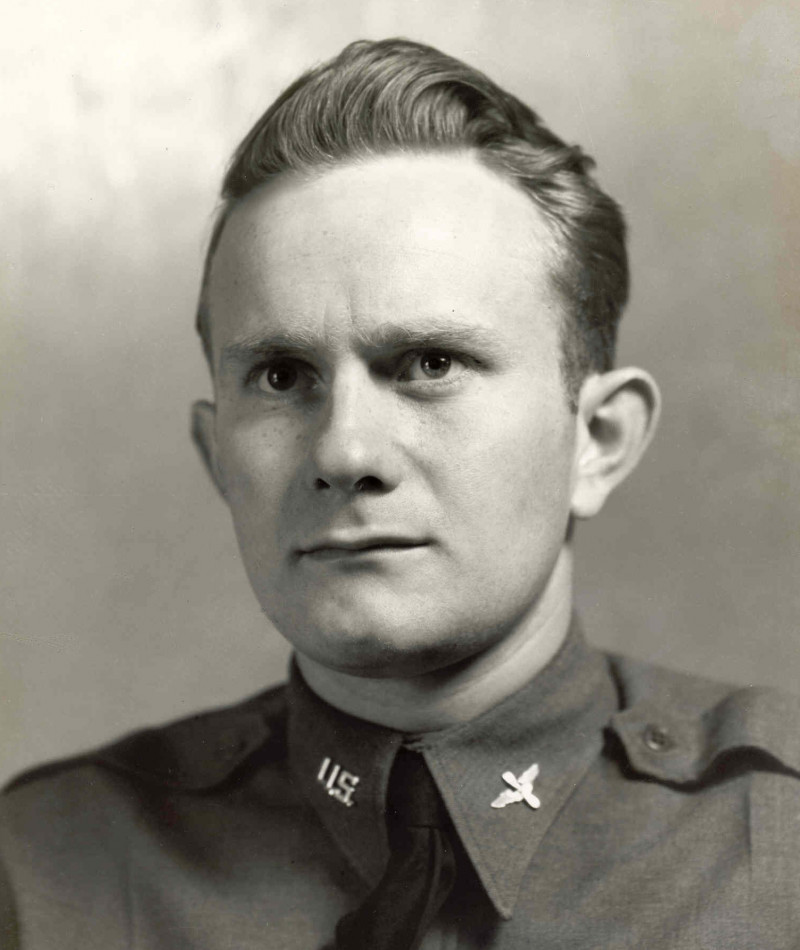
- Major John L. Jerstad, U.S. Army Air Corps, World War II Medal of Honor Recipient (Congressional Medal of Honor Society)
- Born: February 12, 1918; Racine, Wisconsin, U.S.
- Died: August 1, 1943 (aged 25); Ploieşti, Kingdom of Romania
- Burial place: Ardennes American Cemetery and Memorial
- Military career
- Allegiance: United States of America
- Branch: United States Army Air Forces
- Service years: 1941 – 1943
- Rank: Major
- Nickname: “Jack”
- Unit: 2nd Bombardment Wing
- Conflicts: World War II: European air campaign; Oil campaign; Operation Tidal Wave †
- Awards: Medal of Honor; Silver Star; Distinguished Flying Cross; Purple Heart; Air Medal (4)

John Louis Jerstad (February 12, 1918 – August 1, 1943) was a United States Army Air Forces officer who was posthumously awarded the United States military's highest decoration, the Medal of Honor. He received the medal for his actions as a B-24 pilot during a raid on Ploieşti, Romania, in World War II.

== Early life ==
Born and raised in Racine, Wisconsin, Jerstad was the older of two children of Art and Alice Jerstad. His sister Mary was four years his junior. Jerstad attended Washington Park High School and, after graduating in 1936, went on to Northwestern University, earning a degree there in 1940. He participated in Boy Scouts and Sea Scouts, and while in college he returned to Racine during the summers to run a children's day camp. He taught school for a year in La Due, Missouri, before enlisting in the United States Army Air Forces in July 1941.

== Military service ==
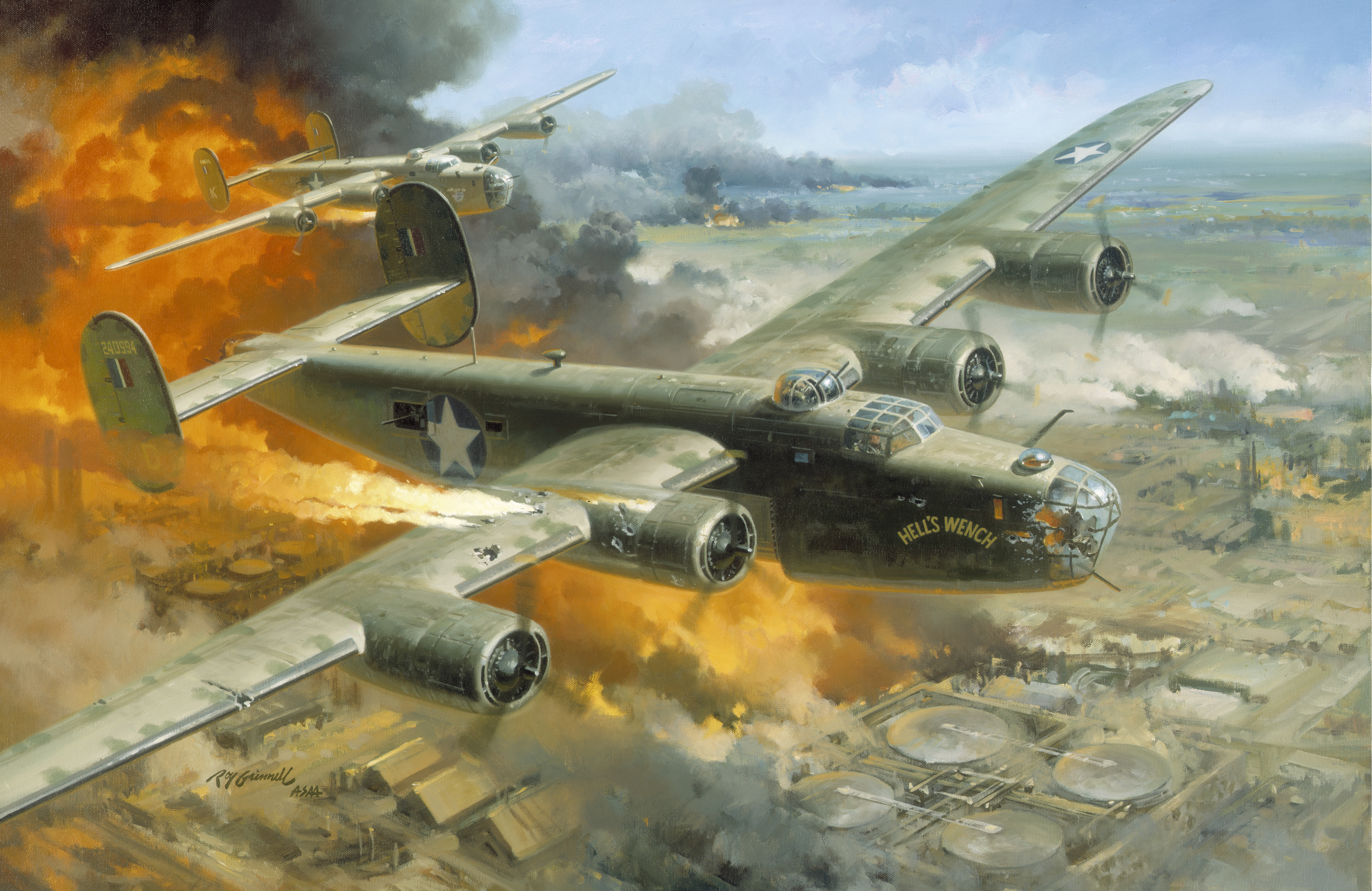
Roy Grinnell's painting Fire over Ploesti depicts Jerstad's badly damaged bomber over the oil refineries at Ploesti, Romania

Jerstad enlisted as an aviation cadet at Milwaukee, Wisconsin, on July 12, 1941. He trained at Ontario, California, and Luke Field, Arizona. He was commissioned on February 6, 1942, and served with the 98th and 93rd Bomb Groups at Barksdale Field, Louisiana. In October 1942, he went to Europe with the 93rd and flew B-24s with the 328th Bomb Squadron, as a captain. He was promoted to major in April 1943, and was assigned to the 2nd Bomb Wing headquarters a month later. He was picked by Colonel Edward L. Timberlake, former commander of the "Traveling Circus" to be Timberlake's chief operations officer.

By August 1943, he had completed more than his tour of missions. He was no longer directly connected with the 93rd Bomb Group. He had conducted many of the missions in an aircraft nicknamed "Jerk's Natural"; "Jerk" was a reference to his own name, Jack Jerstad, and "Natural" referred to the fact the plane's serial numbers added to 7 and 11, a "natural" in dice games. When Jerstad heard of the upcoming low-level bombing mission against the oil refineries at Ploieşti, Romania, he volunteered to lead a formation. The mission was Operation Tidal Wave, in which 179 B-24s took off on an 18-hour, 2,400 mile round-trip mission to destroy the largest of the oil refineries at Ploieşti, 30 miles north of Bucharest, Romania. This mission, conducted on August 1, 1943, ended with five U.S. Air Force airmen, including Maj. John L. Jerstad, earning the Medal of Honor; three, including Jerstad, posthumously. Sixty aircraft were lost on the mission.

Three miles from the target, Jerstad's bomber, nicknamed "Hell's Wench", was badly damaged and set aflame by enemy ground fire. More than 230 anti-aircraft guns, supported by many barrage balloons and smoke pots, surrounded the refineries, with more than 400 fighters in the area. Ignoring the fact he was flying above a field suitable for a forced landing, he kept on course. After the bombs were released on the target, the fire in his aircraft became so intense that it made further progress impossible, and the B-24 crashed into the target area. Jerstad was listed as missing in action.

For these actions, he was awarded the Medal of Honor on October 28, 1943. His family accepted the medal on his behalf during a presentation ceremony at Holy Communion Church in Racine.

== Awards and honors ==

Army Air Forces Pilot Badge
Medal of Honor	Silver Star	Distinguished Flying Cross
Purple Heart	Air Medal with three bronze oak leaf clusters	American Defense Service Medal
American Campaign Medal	European–African–Middle Eastern Campaign Medal with two bronze campaign stars	World War II Victory Medal

Army Presidential Unit Citation

=== Medal of Honor Citation ===
Jerstad's official Medal of Honor citation reads as follows:

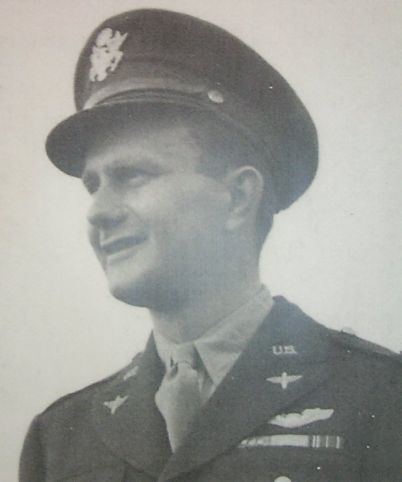
John L. Jerstad, U.S. Air Force Photo

For conspicuous gallantry and intrepidity above and beyond the call of duty. On 1 August 1943, he served as pilot of the lead aircraft in his group in a daring low-level attack against enemy oil refineries and installations at Ploesti, Romania. Although he had completed more than his share of missions and was no longer connected with this group, so high was his conception of duty that he volunteered to lead the formation in the correct belief that his participation would contribute materially to success in this attack. Maj. Jerstad led the formation into attack with full realization of the extreme hazards involved and despite withering fire from heavy and light antiaircraft guns. Three miles from the target his airplane was hit, badly damaged, and set on fire. Ignoring the fact that he was flying over a field suitable for a forced landing, he kept on the course. After the bombs of his aircraft were released on the target, the fire in his ship became so intense as to make further progress impossible and he crashed into the target area. By his voluntary acceptance of a mission he knew was extremely hazardous, and his assumption of an intrepid course of action at the risk of life over and above the call of duty, Maj. Jerstad set an example of heroism which will be an inspiration to the U.S. Armed Forces.

=== Legacy ===
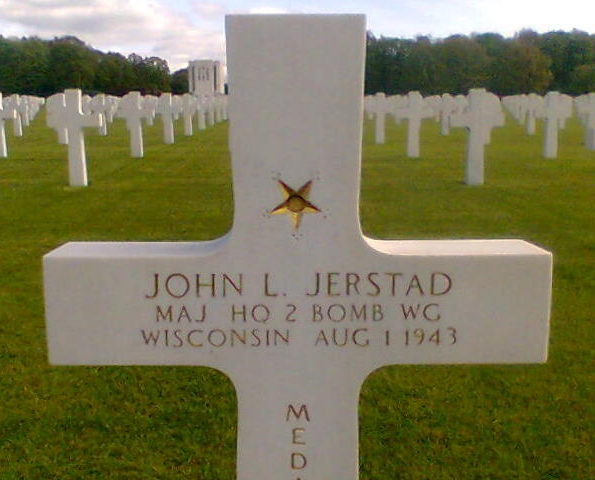
Jerstad's grave at Ardennes American Cemetery

Seven years after his aircraft was shot down, the military notified Jerstad's family that his remains had been located. He was buried at the Ardennes American Cemetery near Neupré, Belgium.

Jerstad-Agerholm Elementary/Middle School in Racine is named in honor of Jerstad and fellow Medal of Honor recipient and Racine native Harold C. Agerholm. The Legacy Museum, run by the Racine Veterans Center, includes an exhibit of photographs and artifacts relating to the two men.

== See also ==
- List of Medal of Honor recipients for World War II
- List of solved missing person cases
