= 339th Fighter Group =

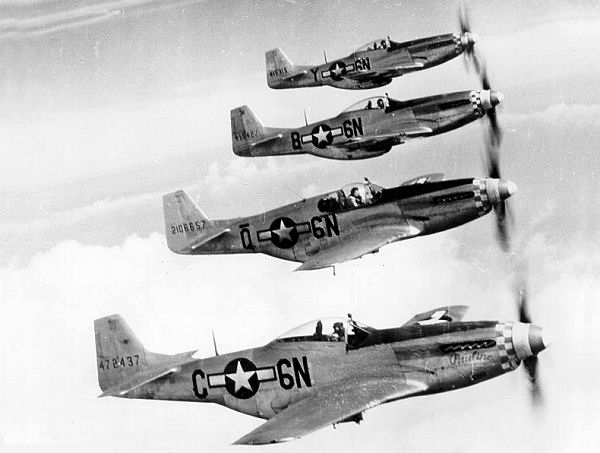
- P-51 Mustangs of the 339th Fighter Group
- Active: 1942–1945
- Country: United States
- Branch: United States Army Air Forces
- Garrison/HQ: RAF Fowlmere
- Engagements: Air Offensive, Europe; Normandy; Market Garden; Battle of the Bulge; Invasion of Germany
- Decorations: Distinguished Unit Citation

Insignia
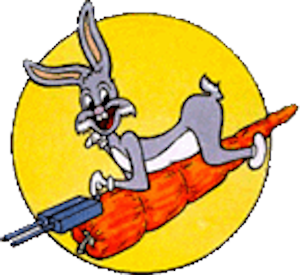
- 503rd Fighter Squadron (D7)

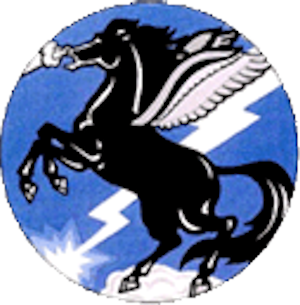
- 504th Fighter Squadron (5Q)

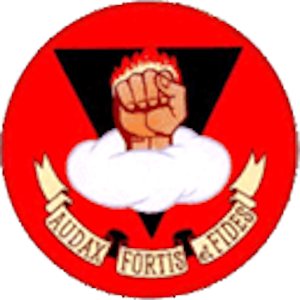
- 505th Fighter Squadron (6N)

Aircraft flown
- Fighter: A-24 Banshee 1942–1943; A-25 Shrike 1942–1943; P-39 Airacobra 1943–1944; P-51 Mustang 1944–1945

The 339th Fighter Group was a unit of the United States Air Forces during World War II. It comprised the 503rd, 504th, and 505th Fighter Squadrons.

The group was an Eighth Air Force fighter unit stationed in England assigned to RAF Fowlmere. It had the highest claims of air and ground enemy aircraft victories in one year, and was the only group to claim over a hundred ground strafing victories on two occasions – 105 on 4 April 1945 and 118 on 16 April 1945. It was inactivated on 18 October 1945.

== Formation and training ==
The group was constituted as the 339th Bombardment Group (Dive) on 3 August at Hunter Field, Georgia as a Third Air Force Operational Training Unit and was equipped with A-24 Banshee and A-25 Shrike dive bombers.

The group moved to Drew Field, Florida, in February 1943 then to Walterboro Army Airfield, South Carolina, in July 1943 and finally to Rice Army Airfield, California, in September 1943. The latter was part of Desert Training Center in Mojave Desert. They converted to Bell P-39 Airacobra aircraft in 1943.

== European theatre ==
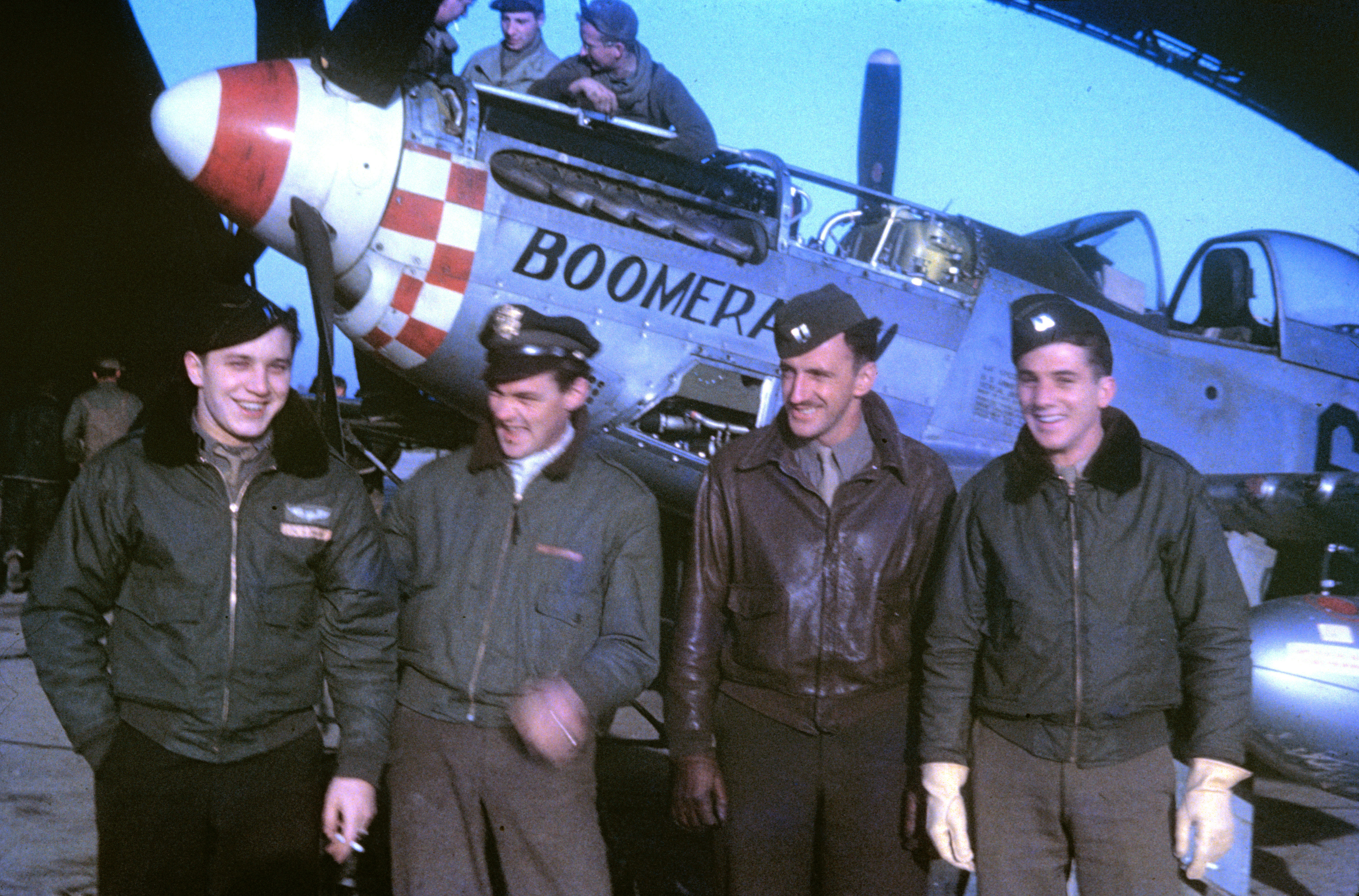
Captain George Hrico, Captain Evan Johnson, Major Archie Tower and Lieutenant Richard Krauss of the 339th Fighter Group at RAF Fowlmere

The group was reassigned to the 66th Fighter Wing of VIII Fighter Command and stationed at RAF Fowlmere in England in April 1944 and was redesignated 339th Fighter Group in May 1944. They were equipped with P-51 Mustang aircraft and the first combat operation was on 30 April 1944.

The unit engaged primarily in B-17/B-24 escort duties during its first five weeks of operations, and afterwards flew many escort missions to cover the operations of medium and heavy bombers that struck strategic objectives, interdicted the enemy's communications, or supported operations on the ground.

The group strafed airfields and other targets of opportunity while on escort missions. The 339th received a Distinguished Unit Citation for operations on 10 and 11 September 1944. On the first of those days, when it escorted bombers to a target in Germany and then attacked an aerodrome near Erding, the group destroyed or damaged many enemy planes despite the intense fire it encountered from anti-aircraft guns and small arms. The following day the bomber formation being escorted to Munich was attacked by enemy fighters, but members of the 339th group destroyed a number of the interceptors and drove off the others and at the same time, other members of the 339th were attacking an airfield near Karlsruhe, where they encountered heavy fire but were able to destroy or damage many of the aircraft parked on the field.

The 339th provided fighter cover over the English Channel and the coast of Normandy during the invasion of France in June 1944. They strafed and dive-bombed vehicles, locomotives, marshalling yards, anti-aircraft batteries, and troops while Allied forces fought to break out of the beachhead in France.

The group attacked transportation targets as Allied armies drove across France after the breakthrough at Saint-Lô in July and flew area patrols during the airborne attack on Holland in September.

They escorted bombers and flew patrols during the Battle of the Bulge from December 1944 – January 1945. They provided area patrols during the assault across the Rhine in March 1945.

== Aces of the 339th FG ==
Name and Rank	Number of Aircraft Destroyed	Note
Capt. Francis R. Gerard	8.00
Maj. William E. Bryan Jr.	7.50
Maj. Donald A. Larson	6.00
Capt. James R. Starnes	6.00
1st Lt. Lester C. Marsh	5.00
Capt. Robert H. Ammon	5.00
Capt. Edward H. Beavers	5.00
1st Lt. J.S. Daniell	5.00

- Lt. Col. Dale E. Shafer, commanding officer of the 503rd Fighter Squadron, scored four aerial victories while flying Spitfires with the 31st Fighter Group in the Mediterranean Theater of Operations and three while serving with the 339th Fighter Group, bringing his total to seven aerial victories during the war.

== Post war ==
The 339th Fighter Group returned to Camp Kilmer, New Jersey and was inactivated on 18 October 1945. The unit was redesignated 107th Fighter Group and allotted to the New York National Guard on 24 May 1946.
