= Lyell Cave =

Cave in Liège Province, Belgium

Coordinates: 50°34′41″N 5°24′32″E

Lyell Cave (Grande caverne d'Engihoul)
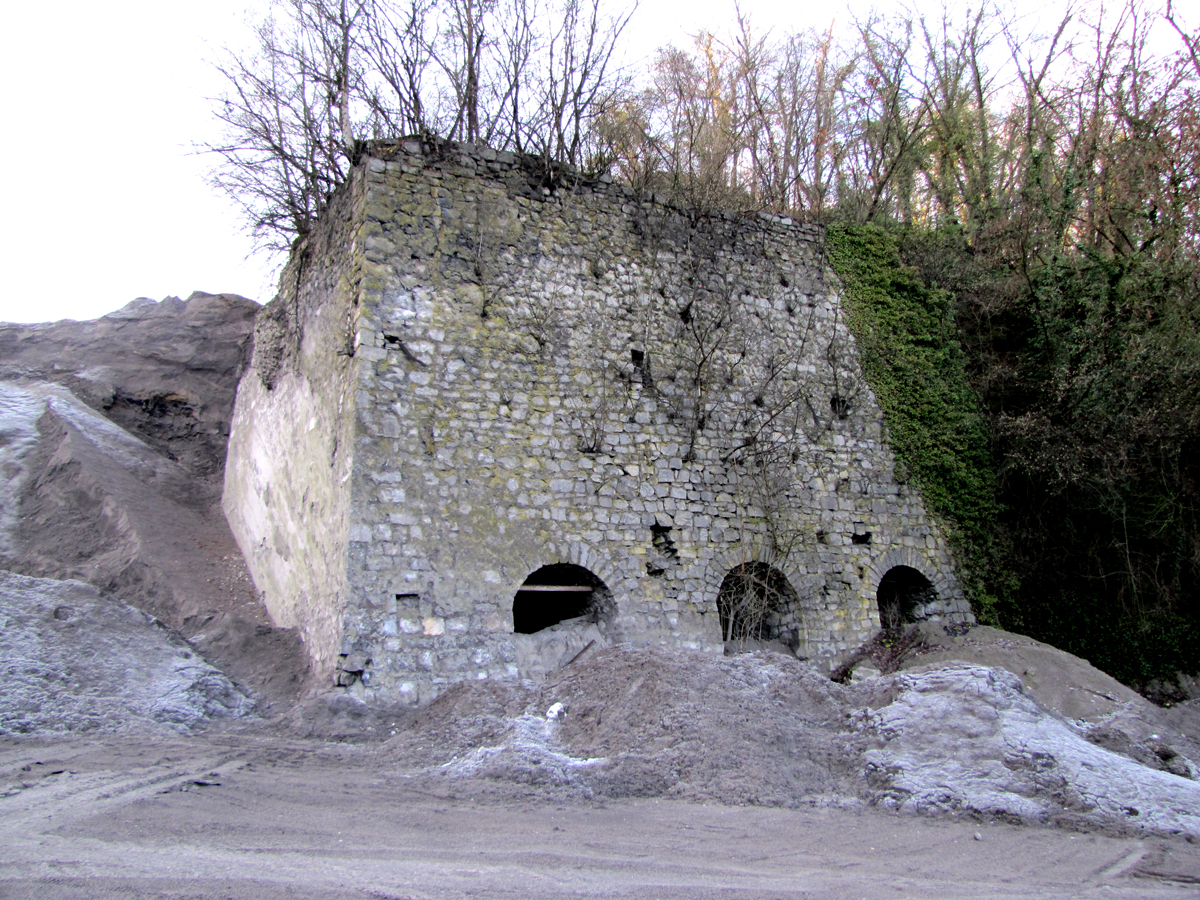
- Lime kiln at eastern entrance of Lyell Cave
- Interactive map of Lyell Cave (Grande caverne d'Engihoul)
- Location: Engihoul, Éhein (Engis)
- Geology: Limestone of the Viséan

The Lyell Cave, formerly called Grande caverne d'Engihoul, is located near the ancienne commune of Éhein, municipality of Engis, Liège Province, Belgium. It is one of many caves investigated or discovered by Philippe-Charles Schmerling, in 1831; the cave is named for a later researcher, Sir Charles Lyell, who visited the cave in 1860.

Together with the Rosée Cave, it was classified as an exceptional cultural heritage of Wallonia in July 1988, making it accessible only to scientific researchers. The cave's troglofauna includes Belgium's only cave-inhabiting beetle, Tychobythinus belgicus.

== Location ==
The Lyell Cave is located in Éhein on the edge of the valley of Engihoul, where the stream named Engihoul runs by the route des 36 tournants, in a syncline formed during the Viséan, near the "Lion's quarry".

== Name ==
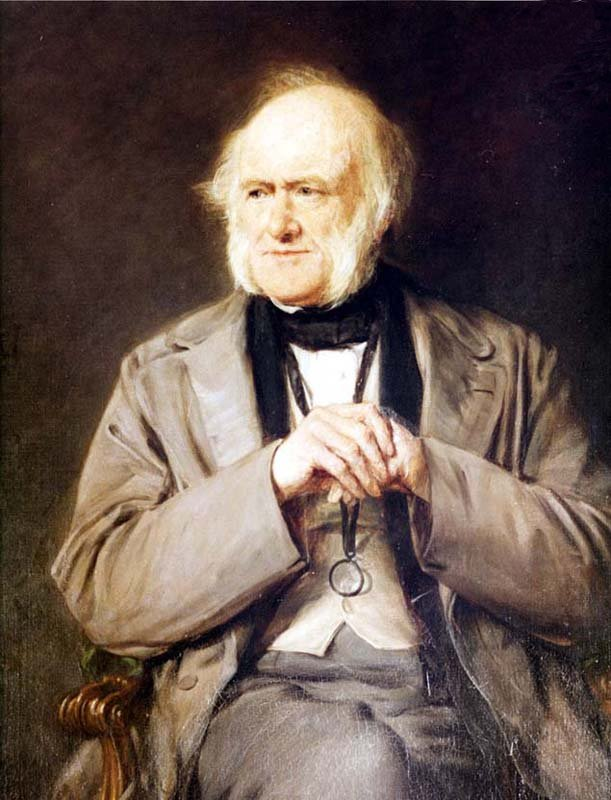
Portrait of Charles Lyell

Philippe-Charles Schmerling wrote of his searches in the "caves of Engihoul" in his book Recherches sur les ossemens fossiles découverts dans les cavernes de la province de Liège, which was published two years after his exploration of the place.

In 1833 he met geologist Charles Lyell, who was passing through Liège, and told him of his theories about prehistoric humans. Lyell was interested enough to mention them in his Principes de géologie the following year, but without giving it the importance he would assign it later.

In 1860 Lyell returned to Liège and decided to examine the "caverne d'Engihoul" with the help of the Belgian professor Constantin Malaise, from the Institut agricole de l'État who got him to explore a cave different from Schmerling's.

In honor of that visit, the cave was renamed "Lyell Cave" in the 20th century, from "Grande Caverne d’Engihoul" as it was called in Les Cavernes et les rivières souterraines de la Belgique by E. Van den Broeck, É.-A. Martel and Ed. Rahir.

== Description ==
According to the 1910 description, there are two entrances: the one west, marked B on the map, consists of two couloirs, one of which is closed because the quarry's explosives were stored there. The other, marked A, is in the east, at the bottom of the rocky wall of the ravine of Engihoul, 13 metres (43 ft) from the Meuse. Very narrow and difficult to enter, this passage has been widened and leveled.

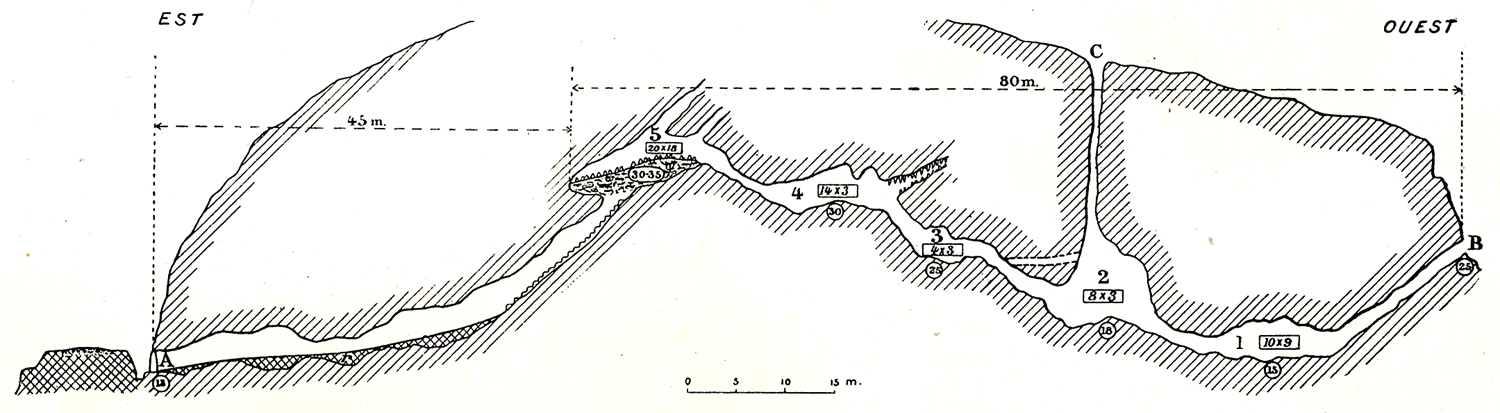
Longitudinal map of the Lyell Cave (or Grande Caverne d'Engihoul), from E. Van den Broeck, É.-A. Martel, and Ed. Rahir, Les cavernes et les rivières souterraines de la Belgique étudiées spécialement dans leurs rapports avec l'hydrologie des calcaires et avec la question des eaux potables, Vol. II Les calcaires carbonifériens du bassin de Dinant et coup d'œil sur le bassin de Namur; H. Lamertin, Bruxelles, 1910.

From west to east, there are five halls, connected via narrow passages:

1. is the deepest, 10 metres (33 ft) below the entrance, measuring 10 by 9 metres (33 by 30 ft);
2. the Hall of the moon, 8 by 3 metres (26.2 by 9.8 ft), a name given by Doudou, because of light entering through a joint in the ceiling;
3. the Hall of Nutons, 4 by 3 metres (13.1 by 9.8 ft), part of which is the gallery containing stalactites, which rises toward the west and is obscured by concretions;
4. the Hall of the Cone, 14 by 3 metres (45.9 by 9.8 ft), named for a cone on the ceiling;
5. the Grand Hall, 20 by 18 metres (66 by 59 ft), and four metres (13 ft) high, with two oblique chimneys containing layers of sediment full of bones. These are most likely the remains of some sixty bears and fifty boars, which were collected there by water running through the cave.

== Subsequent research ==
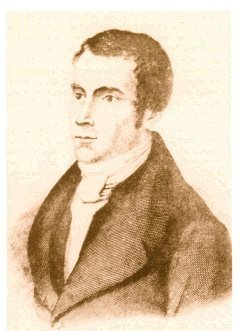
Philippe-Charles Schmerling

Professor Joseph Antoine Spring, of the University of Liège, visited the cave in 1853, before Charles Lyell and Constantin Malaise did in 1860. Malaise exhumed fragments of human skulls that were later studied by E.-T. Hamy. De Puygt and Lohest, members of the Anthropological Society of Brussels, found Neolithic engravings made with silex. In 1894, paleontology professor Julien Fraipont of the University of Liège found animal bones and tools made of silex. The site has also been pilfered by private individuals for their personal collections.

In the 1890s, Ernest Doudou found new cavities containing human and animal remains, sharpened tools of silex, pottery fragments, bones that had been worked on, bronze and iron objects, traces of ancient fires, from different eras. He concluded that the cave was occupied from the Paleolithic to the Middle Ages; most of these objects were deposited at the University of Liège.

== Exceptional patrimony classification ==
With the Rosée Cave, with which it forms a single system, it is classified as an exceptional cultural heritage of Wallonia since 8 July 1988. It is accessible only to scientific researchers, since access by tourists and amateur speleologists risks upsetting the biotope's natural balance with changes to temperature and light, walking through the clay, and the import of nutritional elements that favor certain organisms. The entrance was closed after the cave was filmed.

The cave was owned in the past by the Carmeuse company, which transferred its ownership in 1999 to the non-profit Les Chercheurs de la Wallonie.

=== Biological importance ===
The Lyell Cave is relatively uninteresting from the point of view of paleontology, but has interesting biodiversity, as evidenced by 20th-c biospeleologists including Robert Leruth. They have verified many invertebrates some of which were considered endemic to this cave:

- Microniphargus leruthi, found later also in a German cave;
- Tychobythinus belgicus, discovered in the 1940s, and found afterward, in 1998, in the grotte Nicole in Flémalle, a recently developed troglobite since it still has minuscule eyes.

The Diplura Litocampa hubarti, discovered in June 1999, was thought to be endemic until June 2000.

Also found were:

- Porrhomma microphthalmum, a spider;
- Schellencandona triquetra, an ostracod;
- Niphargus fontanus, an amphipoda;
- Deharvengiurus severini, a springtail;
- Plutomurus unidentatus, a springtail;
- Lengersdorfia flabellata, a fly.
