= Ardennes American Cemetery and Memorial =

ABMC World War II cemetery in Liège, Belgium

- American Battle Monuments Commission
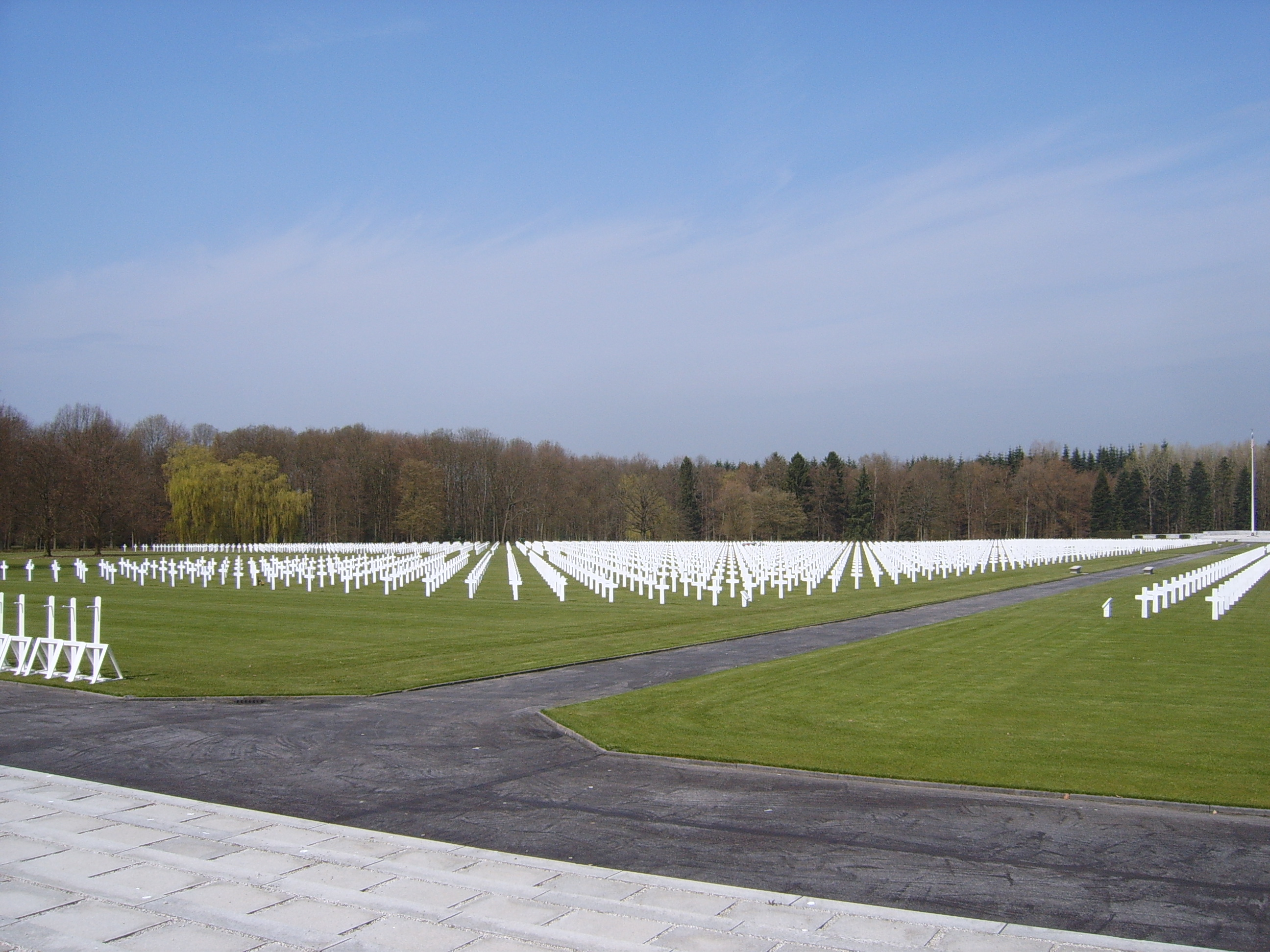
- Headstones at the cemetery
- Used for those deceased 1941–1945
- Established: 8 February 1945
- Location: 50°32′51″N 5°27′56″E near Neupré, Wallonia, Belgium
- Designed by: Reinhard, Hofmeister & Walquist; Richard K. Webel (landscaping)
- Total burials: 5,329
- Unknowns: 792

Ardennes American Cemetery and Memorial is a Second World War American military war grave cemetery, located in the village of Neuville-en-Condroz, near the southeast edge of Neupré, some 20 km (12 mi) south-west of Liège in Belgium. The cemetery, dedicated in 1960, contains 5,329 American war dead and covers 90.5 acres (36.6 ha). It is one of three American war cemeteries in Belgium, the other two being at Flanders Field and Henri-Chapelle and is administered by the American Battle Monuments Commission (ABMC).

== History ==
The site of the cemetery was liberated from German control by the U.S. 1st Infantry Division on 8 September 1944. A temporary cemetery was established on the site on 8 February 1945. After the war, the Ardennes site was designated a permanent cemetery, becoming one of 14 permanent cemeteries for American World War II dead on foreign soil. All temporary cemeteries were disestablished by the U.S. Army, and the bodies of those whose next of kin requested permanent burial overseas were moved to one of the fourteen permanent cemeteries.

The American Battle Monuments Commission oversaw the design and construction of the site. Architects Reinhard, Hofmeister & Walquist of New York City were hired to design the cemetery and memorial, while the landscaping was designed by Richard K. Webel of Roslyn, New York. Construction of the cemetery and memorial was completed in 1962.

The Ardennes American Cemetery served as the location of the Central Identification Point for the Graves Registration Service (now known as Mortuary Affairs) of the U.S. Army Quartermaster Corps during much of the life of the Service. The Graves Registration Service interred the dead at the Ardennes cemetery in the distinctive grave pattern proposed by the architect and approved by the commission. When the interment program was completed the cemetery was turned over to the ABMC for maintenance and administration.

== Layout and memorial ==
Carl Paul Jennewein designed the limestone facade of the memorial, completed in 1963.

The Ardennes American Cemetery is generally rectangular in shape. Its grave plots are arranged in the form of a Greek cross separated by two broad intersecting paths. At the east end of the traverse path is a bronze figure symbolizing American youth, designed by sculptor C. Paul Jennewein. The cemetery is surrounded on all sides by stands of trees.

An approach drive leads to the memorial, a rectangular structure bearing on its south facade a 5 m (16 ft) high American eagle with three figures symbolizing Justice, Liberty, and Truth and thirteen stars representing the United States. This facade was designed by C. Paul Jennewein. The facade on the far (north) end, which overlooks the burial area, bears the insignia in mosaic of the major United States units which operated in northwest Europe in World War II. Along the outside of the memorial are the Tablets of the Missing, granite slabs on which are inscribed the names of 462 American missing (15 Navy and 447 Army and Army Air Forces) who gave their lives in the service of their country, but whose remains were never recovered or identified. Within the memorial are a chapel, three large wall maps composed of inlaid marble, marble panels depicting combat and supply activities and other ornamental features.

== Interments ==
Many of the 5,329 people interred at the Ardennes American Cemetery died during Nazi Germany's final major offensive in the west, the Battle of the Bulge. They include some service troops who were fighting as infantry. Others died in the advance to the Rhine and across Germany, and in the area during the strategic bombardment of Europe; three-fifths of the burials in the cemetery are airmen.

The dead came from almost every state in the United States as well as from Washington, D.C., Canada, Denmark, England, France, Germany, Ireland, the Philippines, and the British West Indies. 777 of the headstones mark the graves of 792 unidentified bodies. Among the headstones are eleven instances in which two brothers are buried side by side. There are also three cases in which two identified airmen are buried in single graves.

The cemetery is closed to future interments except in cases of recently-recovered remains of American World War II dead. For example, in 1992, the remains of possible American war dead were discovered in a forest east of Elsenborn, Belgium. Through DNA testing, one set of remains was identified as Sgt. John T. Puckett of Wichita, Kansas, who had been listed as missing in action during the Battle of the Bulge. Puckett's family requested he be interred in the cemetery, and his burial there took place on 18 June 2005.

== Notable burials ==
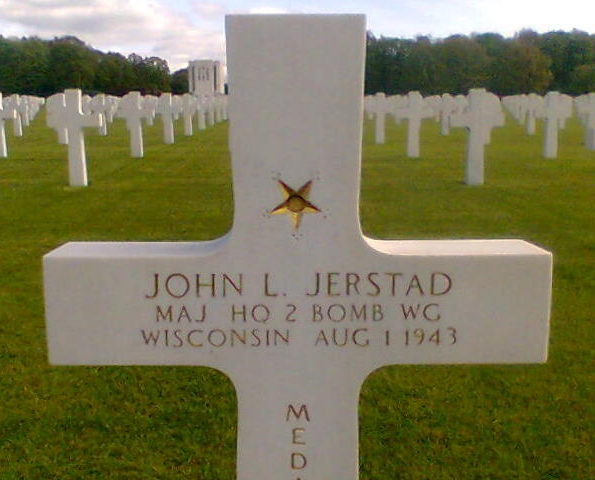
Grave marker for Medal of Honor recipient John L. Jerstad

Three Medal of Honor recipients are honored in the cemetery, their graves are marked by special headstones with gold lettering:

- Technical Sergeant Charles F. Carey Jr. (1915–1945 †), infantry sergeant
- Major John L. Jerstad (1918–1943 †), B-24 bomber pilot
- Captain Darrell R. Lindsey (1918–1944 †), B-26 bomber pilot, is listed on the Tablets of the Missing cenotaph

Other notable burials include:

- Lieutenant Bert Stiles (1920–1944 †), an author and pilot who wrote a posthumously published memoir of his aerial combat experiences
- Lieutenant James Gordon Dennis (1921–1944 †), a B-17 bomber co-pilot shot down over Berlin, who was murdered in the open street by propaganda ministry official Alfred Ingemar Berndt after Dennis had parachuted and was captured
- Major Donald A. Larson (1915–1944 †), a flying ace pilot who was credited in destroying six enemy airplanes in aerial combat and the namesake of Larson Air Force Base
- Major Leroy A. Schreiber (1917–1944 †), a flying ace pilot who was credited in destroying 12 enemy airplanes in aerial combat
- Robert Perkins Post (1910–1943), worked as a reporter for The New York Times during World War II as part of a group of eight reporters known as the Writing 69th who flew bomber missions with United States Eighth Air Force
- Staff Sergeant James Redmond (1901–1944 †), an artist in California before the war
