= Richard K. Webel =

American landscape architect

- Born: July 5, 1900
- Died: November 1, 2000 (aged 100)
- Occupation: Architect
- Practice: Innocenti & Webel
- Projects: Ardennes American Cemetery and Memorial

Richard K. Webel (July 5, 1900 – November 1, 2000) was an American landscape architect.

== Career ==
Webel was co-head of Innocenti & Webel, founded in 1931 with Umberto Innocenti.

Webel was responsible for the landscaping of Ardennes American Cemetery and Memorial. He landscaped numerous golf courses across the US. He designed the landscaping at places as diverse as the Frick Collection and the American wing of the Metropolitan Museum of Art in Manhattan; Blair House, the presidential guest quarters across the street from the White House; the Governor's Mansion in Albany; Wellesley College in Massachusetts; Sweet Briar College in Virginia; Aqueduct Racetrack in Queens.

== Personal life ==
Webel married Pauline Dodge Pratt (widow of Frederic R. Pratt, a grandson of Charles Pratt) in 1969. They had one child, Richard C. Webel. He was a graduate of Harvard College and the Harvard Graduate School of Design.
