= No. 124 Squadron RAF =

Defunct flying squadron of the Royal Air Force

No. 124 (Baroda) Squadron RAF
- Active: 1 March 1918 – 17 August 1918; 10 May 1941 – 1 April 1946
- Country: United Kingdom
- Branch: Royal Air Force
- Nickname: Baroda
- Motto: "Danger is our opportunity"

Insignia
- Squadron Badge heraldry: A mongoose passant. The mongoose is an inhabitant of India and is known for its speed and ferocity in killing its enemies.
- Squadron Codes: PK (Apr 1939 – Sep 1939); ON (May 1941 – Sep 1946)

No. 124 Squadron RAF was a Royal Air Force light bomber training unit in World War I. It was reformed as a fighter unit in World War II partly due to a "generous gift" of £50,000 from the Maharajah of Baroda, with the College of Arms creating a crest in December 1942 featuring a mongoose and the name "Baroda Squadron".

== History ==
=== Formation and World War I ===
No. 124 Squadron Royal Flying Corps was formed on 1 February 1918 at RFC Old Sarum and shortly after became a unit of the newly formed Royal Air Force. After a move to RAF Fowlmere 124 Sqn disbanded on 17 August 1918 having only operated as a training squadron.

=== World War II ===
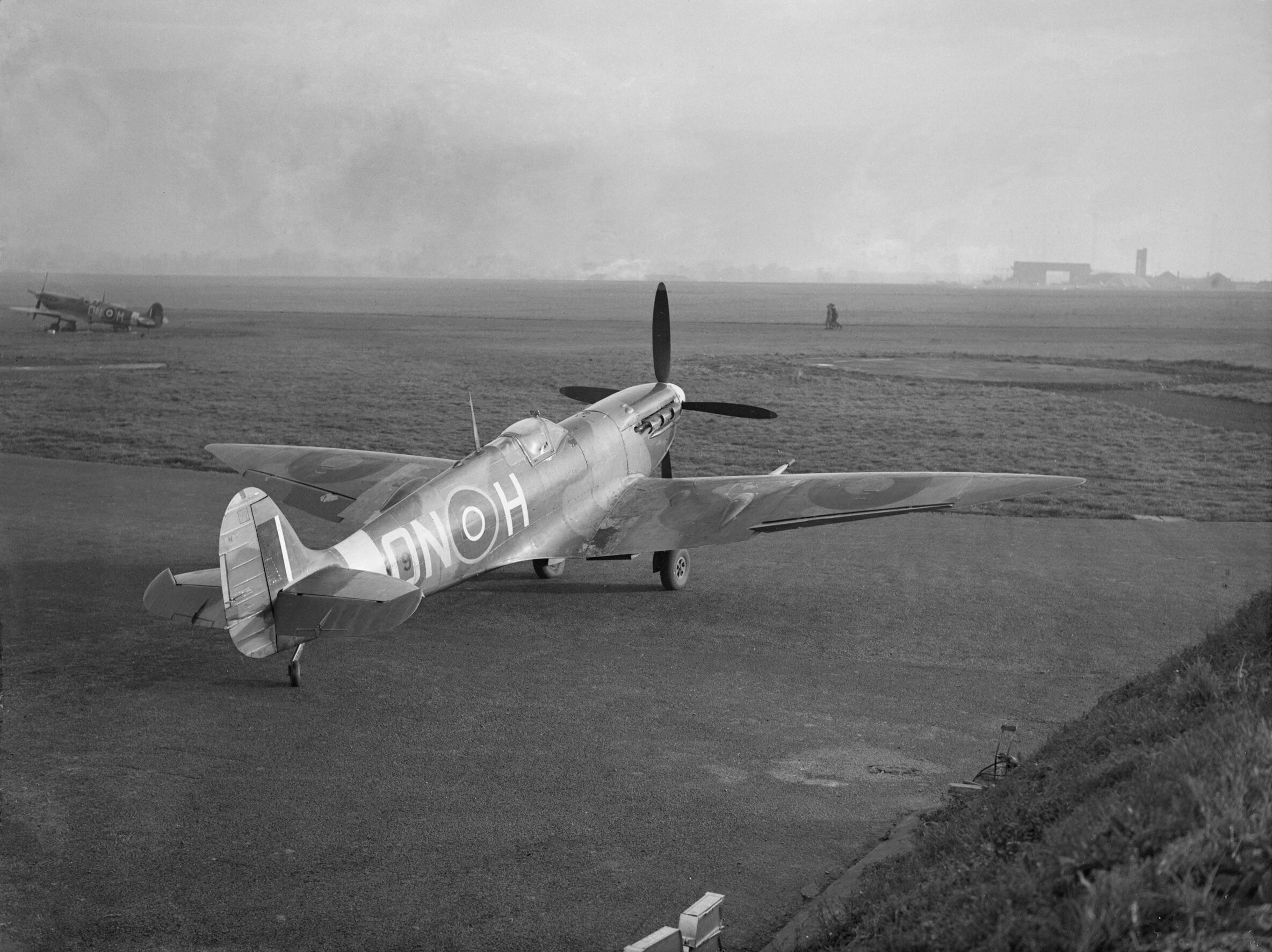
A Spitfire Mk VI of 124 squadron at RAF North Weald in 1942

Around the outbreak of World War II, from April to September 1939, 124 Sqn was allocated a squadron code but the squadron was not stood up. The squadron eventually reformed on 10 May 1941 as a fighter unit equipped with Spitfire Mk I, stationed at RAF Castletown, to provide air defence for Scapa Flow from 29 June. In October 1941 it converted to Spitfire Mk IIBs. It was then moved to RAF Biggin Hill with Spitfire Mk V taking part in sorties against the German Channel Dash. In April 1942, it received new equipment in the form of the high altitude Spitfire Mk VI, which it took to RAF Drem for a month in December. Returning from Scotland in January 1943, it absorbed the Special Spitfire Flight from RAF Northolt and then to RAF Manston, where in early 1945 the Squadron was intercepting German reconnaissance aircraft at up to 50,000 ft, using Spitfire Mk VIIs with pressurised cockpits.

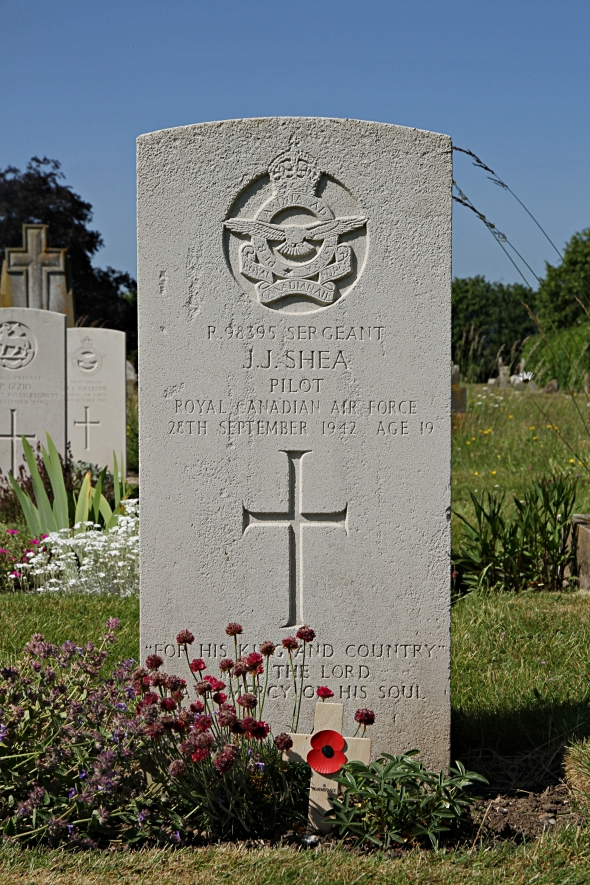
CWGC grave in Chichester, England of an RCAF pilot who served in 124 Squadron and died in 1942

In early February 1945 the Squadron began re-equipping with Spitfire Mk IX.HF(e)’s primarily in order to carry out dive-bombing attacks on the mobile launch sites of the V2 rockets, mainly in the woodland area around The Hague in the Netherlands. On 10 February, the unit moved to RAF Coltishall, Norfolk, the nearest sea-crossing to the target, 120 miles. The V2 rockets had been developed by Wernher von Braun at the Peenemünde Army Research Center. The first rockets to hit London had been in early September 1944. 124 Squadron became the fifth of six squadrons of Spitfire dive-bombers deployed to attempt to take out the mobile launching sites, by flying sorties known in the RAF as ramrods (daylight bomber sorties on specific targets). Attacks were made in two ways.

Firstly, on days when the Squadron received clearance from the RAF Second Tactical Air Force (known as the 2nd TAF) for use of liberated airfields in Belgium, squadron aircraft each dropped a 1000 lb bomb-load onto the target. This consisted of a 500lb bomb under the fuselage, and a 250 lb bomb under each wing. After the attacks, they flew on to one of the liberated airfields – Advanced Landing Grounds – most frequently Ursel Airfield, Maldegem and Kleine Brogel, for refuelling, before return to Coltishall. On a few occasions, they refuelled and also re-armed, to enable further attacks on the launch sites in the Netherlands during the return flight to base.

Alternatively, on days when clearance was not available from 2nd TAF for use of these forward airfields, the bomb-load was 500 lbs. The 500 lb bomb under the fuselage was replaced by a drop tank (referred to at the time an overload tank) needed for the extra fuel for out-and-return sorties. The drop tanks were jettisoned on approach to the Dutch coast, when the pilot switched to the full main fuel tank.

Operations were preceded by early morning photo reconnaissance and/or met flights to try to pointpoint the latest positioning of the mobile launchers, and to check for sufficient visibility and cloud base. After the resulting briefing, the Squadron Leader was responsible for finding the target area and leading all twelve aircraft into the attack on the launch site(s). 124 Squadron's dive bombing runs at the targets usually started at 11,000 feet, with a steep dive of 60 degrees, to an optimum release height of 4,000 feet. During the dive, each pilot attempted to pick out the rocket launcher amongst the trees. Pulling out of the dive at up to 350 mph at the release height resulted in high G forces which could cause pilots temporarily to black out. To deal with this possibility, during the dive pilots trimmed the aircraft so that it automatically pulled up if pressure on the stick was relaxed - as happened during blacking out. The main danger on these operations was not fighter defence, but heavy flak particularly along the coast and during the descent to drop the bombs.

In addition to the ramrods flown against the launching sites, the Squadron also flew sorties known as interdictions. These were low level attacks often flown when the cloud base was too low for dive-bombing the V2 sites. Their objective was finding and bombing railways and other targets to disrupt the movement of rocket launching supplies by the enemy. Interdictions were flown on an out-and-return basis from Coltishall in sections of four aircraft, again with a 500 lb bomb-load using drop tanks. For interdictions, bombs had an 11-second delay to allow the fourth aircraft to clear the area before the bombs exploded.

The squadron also carried out daylight escorts for bombers raiding Germany.

On 7 April the squadron moved to RAF Hawkinge and carried out its last operational sortie on 25 April, following the liberation of the Netherlands by the Allies, and on 27 April the Squadron moved to RAF Hutton Cranswick for squadron training.

On 24 August 1945, 124 Squadron moved to RAF Molesworth, for conversion to the Gloster Meteor, the RAF's first jet fighter. In October the unit transferred to RAF Bentwaters, and in February 1946 to RAF Fairwood Common, before being disbanded at RAF Bentwaters on 1 April 1946, becoming No. 56 Squadron RAF.

== Aircraft operated ==
Aircraft operated by no. 124 Squadron RAF
From	To	Aircraft	Squadron code
Feb 1918	Aug 1918	Airco DH.9 (proposed)	
Feb 1918	Aug 1918	miscellaneous training aircraft	
Apr 1939	Sep 1939	Squadron not stood up	PK
May 1941	Oct 1941	Supermarine Spitfire Mk.I	ON
Oct 1941	Nov 1941	Supermarine Spitfire Mk.IIB	ON
Nov 1941	Jul 1942	Supermarine Spitfire Mk.V	ON
Jul 1942	Feb 1943	Supermarine Spitfire Mk.VI	ON
Mar 1943	Feb 1945	Supermarine Spitfire Mk.VII	ON
Feb 1945	Jul 1945	Supermarine Spitfire Mk IX.HF(e)	ON
Jul 1945	Oct 1945	Converting to Meteor at No. 1335 CU	
Oct 1945	Apr 1946	Gloster Meteor F.3	ON
