= List of protected heritage sites in Neupré =

This table shows an overview of the protected heritage sites in the Walloon town Neupré. This list is part of Belgium's national heritage.

Object	Year/architect	Town/section	Address	Coordinates	Number^{?}	Image
"Li Rodge Mohone" farmhouse ^{(nl)} ^{(fr)}		Neupré		50.550369°N 5.447467°E	62121-CLT-0002-01 Info	De boerderij "Li Rodge Mohone"
"Roche aux Faucons" (area) ^{(nl)} ^{(fr)}		Neupré		50.550932°N 5.554470°E	62121-CLT-0004-01 Info	Het hele gebied genaamd "Roche aux Faucons"
"Roche aux Faucons" (boulder) ^{(nl)} ^{(fr)}		Neupré		50.550932°N 5.554470°E	62121-PEX-0001-01 Info	Het hele gebied genaamd "Roche aux Faucons"
Castle Saint-Donat ^{(nl)} ^{(fr)}		Neupré		50.534896°N 5.539576°E	62121-CLT-0005-01 Info	
View over the Ourthe river along the road to Plainevaux ^{(nl)} ^{(fr)}		Neupré		50.548562°N 5.529387°E	62121-CLT-0007-01 Info	
Forest reserve Vecquée ^{(nl)} ^{(fr)}		Neupré		50.551041°N 5.517098°E	62121-CLT-0008-01 Info	
Bois de la Vecquée ^{(nl)} ^{(fr)}		Neupré		50.577892°N 5.518969°E	62121-CLT-0009-01 Info	

== See also ==
- List of protected heritage sites in Liège (province)
- Neupré
