= Éhein =

Éhein Éhin (Walloon)
- Interactive map of Éhein
- Coordinates: 50°32′N 05°26′E
- Country: Belgium
- Region: Wallonia
- Province: Liège
- Municipality: Neupré

Éhein (French pronunciation: [eɛ̃]; Walloon: Éhin) is a village of Wallonia and a district of the municipality of Neupré, located in the province of Liège, Belgium.

It was a municipality until the fusion of the Belgian municipalities in 1977.

== Caves ==
The rock has many caves, the best-known of which are the Lyell Cave and the Rosée Cave. Early explorations of the caves were done by Philippe-Charles Schmerling starting in 1829. Subsequent researchers, including Ernest Doudou, have proven that the area was inhabited since the Paleolithic.

== Gallery ==
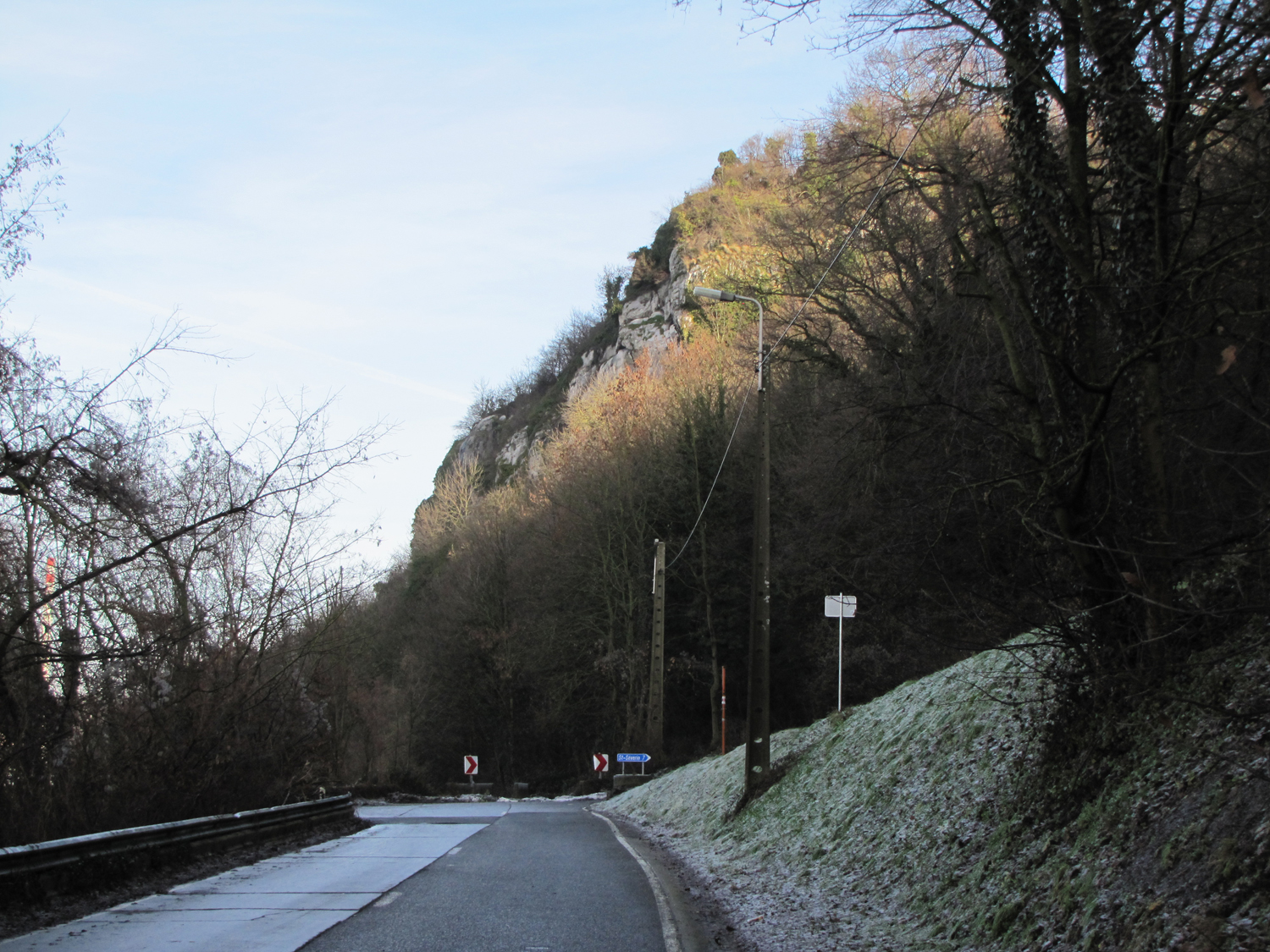
Rocky spur of Engihoul, from the west. Left is the Meuse.

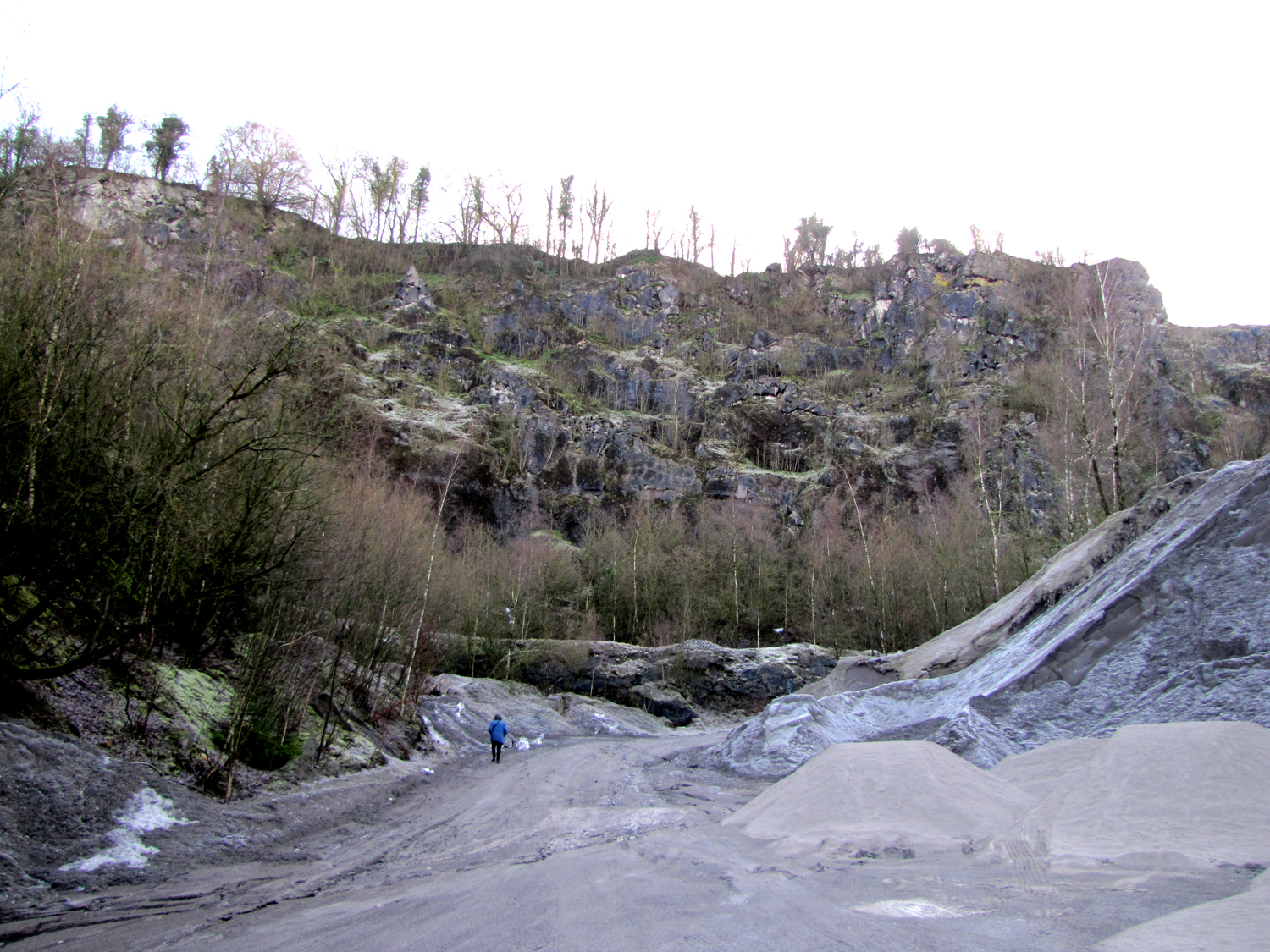
Rocky spur of Engihoul, from the east, starting at the quarry of Carmeuse.

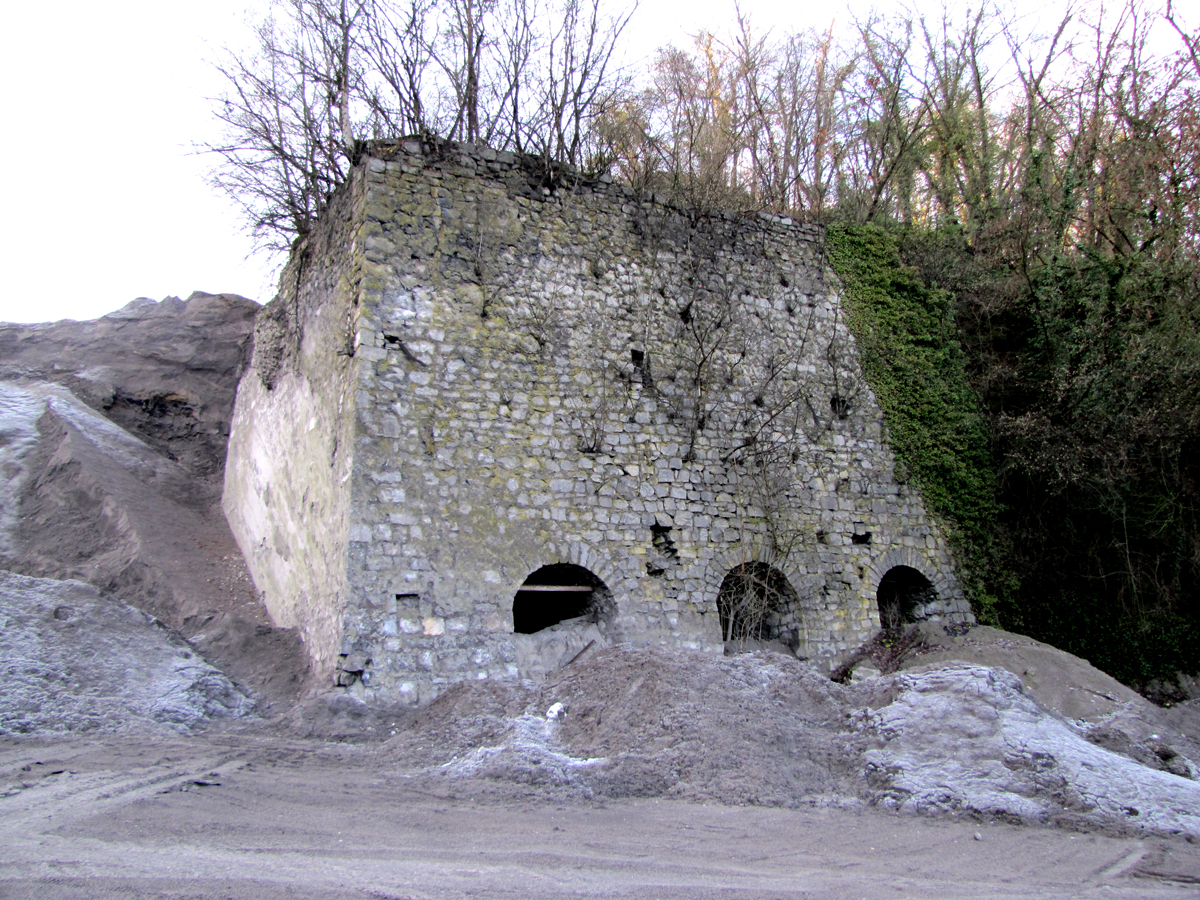
Ancient lime kiln at the foot of the spur (east side).
