= Rimling =

- Commune
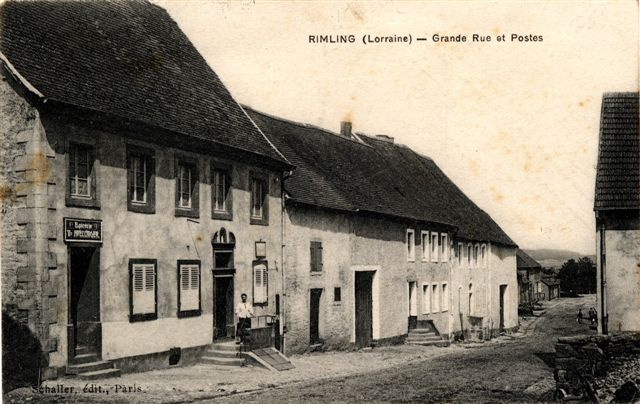
- The main road in Rimling

- Coat of arms
- Location of Rimling
- Location within France Location within Grand Est
- Coordinates: 49°05′48″N 7°15′54″E
- Country: France
- Region: Grand Est
- Department: Moselle
- Arrondissement: Sarreguemines
- Canton: Bitche
- Intercommunality: CC du Pays de Bitche

Government
  - Mayor (2020–2026): Eric Hemmert
- Area^{1}: 13.26 km^{2} (5.12 sq mi)
- Elevation: 300 m (980 ft)
- Highest elevation: 392 m (1,286 ft)
- Lowest elevation: 281 m (922 ft)
- Population (2023): 618
  - Density: 46.6/km^{2} (121/sq mi)
- Time zone: UTC+01:00 (CET)
  - Summer (DST): UTC+02:00 (CEST)
- INSEE/Postal code: 57584 /57720
- ^{1} French Land Register data, which excludes lakes, ponds, glaciers > 1 km^{2} (0.386 sq mi or 247 acres) and river estuaries.

Rimling (French pronunciation: [ʁimlɛ̃]; German: Rimlingen; Lorraine Franconian: Rimlinge) is a commune in the Moselle department of the Grand Est administrative region in north-eastern France.

The village belongs to the Pays de Bitche.

== See also ==
- Communes of the Moselle department
