= Fowlmere Airfield =

Airfield in England

Coordinates: 52°04′57″N 000°03′31″E

- IATA: none; ICAO: none

Summary
- Location: Royston, Hertfordshire, England
- Built: 1939/40
- In use: 1940-
- Elevation AMSL: 38 m (125 ft)

Map
- Location within Cambridgeshire

Runways
Direction	Length		Surface
Direction	ft	m	Surface
07/25		710	Grass
~~00/00~~			Sommerfeld Tracking

Fowlmere Airfield (ICAO: EGMA) is a privately owned airfield located 4.2 miles (6.8 km) northeast of Royston, Hertfordshire and 8.8 miles (14.2 km) southwest of Cambridge. It was previously a Royal Air Force satellite station, RAF Fowlmere.

== History ==
=== First World War ===
Flying at Fowlmere Airfield originated during the First World War. In 1918 (the last year of the war), the airfield was used by three Royal Air Force (RAF) squadrons, No. 124 Squadron RAF, No. 125 Squadron RAF, and No. 126 Squadron RAF.

Flying cadets of the Air Service, United States Army were trained at Fowlmere by RAF instructors, prior to their cadets being deployed to the Western Front. By 1923, the deserted hangars and assorted buildings had been demolished.

=== Second World War ===
==== Royal Air Force use ====
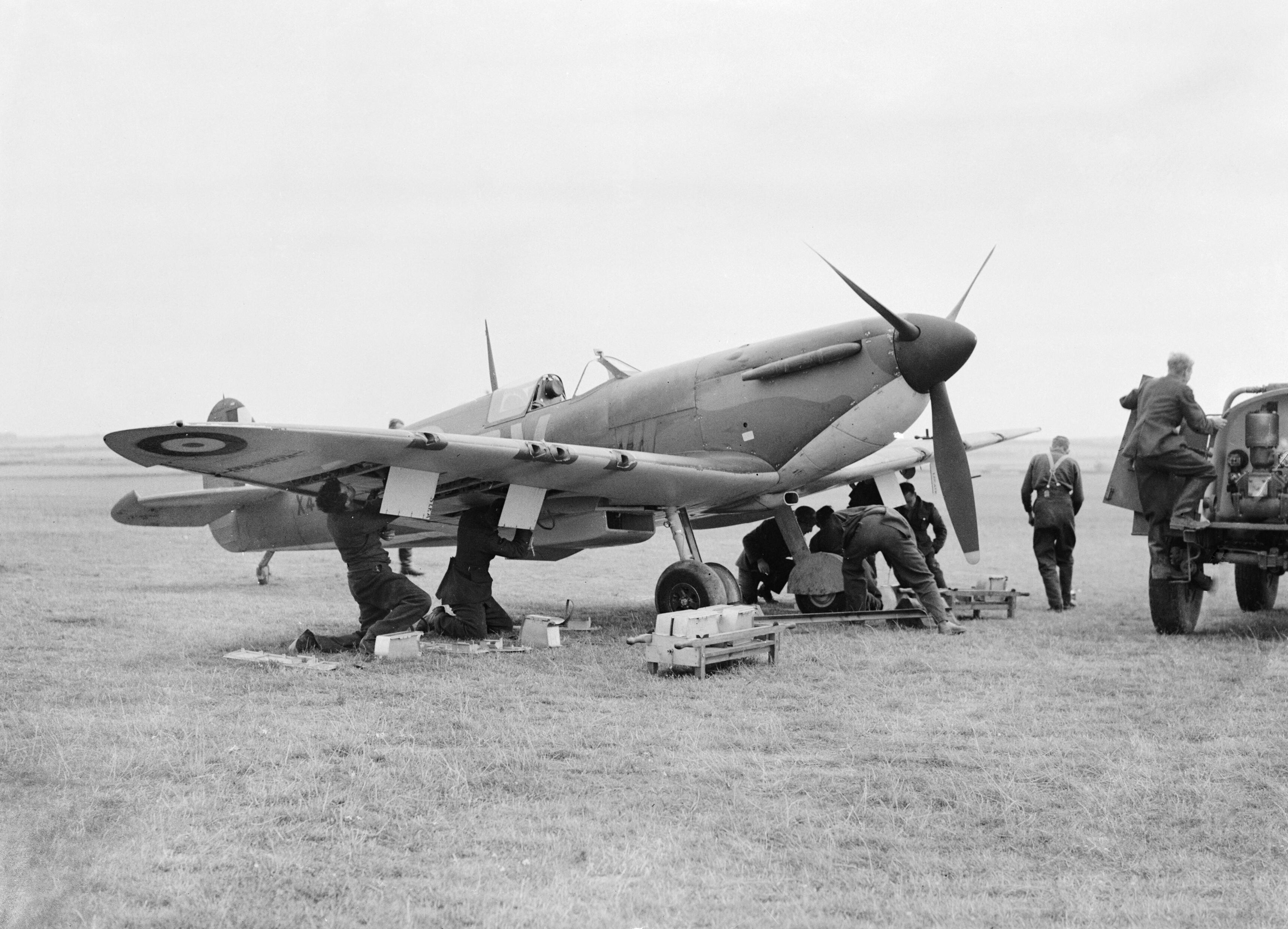
A Supermarine Spitfire Mk 1 being re-armed between sorties at Fowlmere, September 1940

During the Second World War, Fowlmere was a satellite for RAF Fighter Command at nearby RAF Duxford and was used by 19 Squadron with Supermarine Spitfires along with:

- No. 2 Squadron RAF
- No. 15 Squadron RAF
- No. 16 Squadron RAF
- No. 21 Squadron RAF
- No. 111 Squadron RAF.
- No. 133 (Eagle) Squadron RAF
- No. 154 (Motor Industries) Squadron RAF
- No. 167 (Gold Coast) Squadron RAF
- No. 174 (Mauritius) Squadron RAF
- No. 264 (Madras Presidency) Squadron RAF
- No. 411 (Canadian) Squadron RAF
- No. 421 (Canadian) Squadron RAF
- No. 655 Squadron RAF

==== United States Army Air Forces use ====
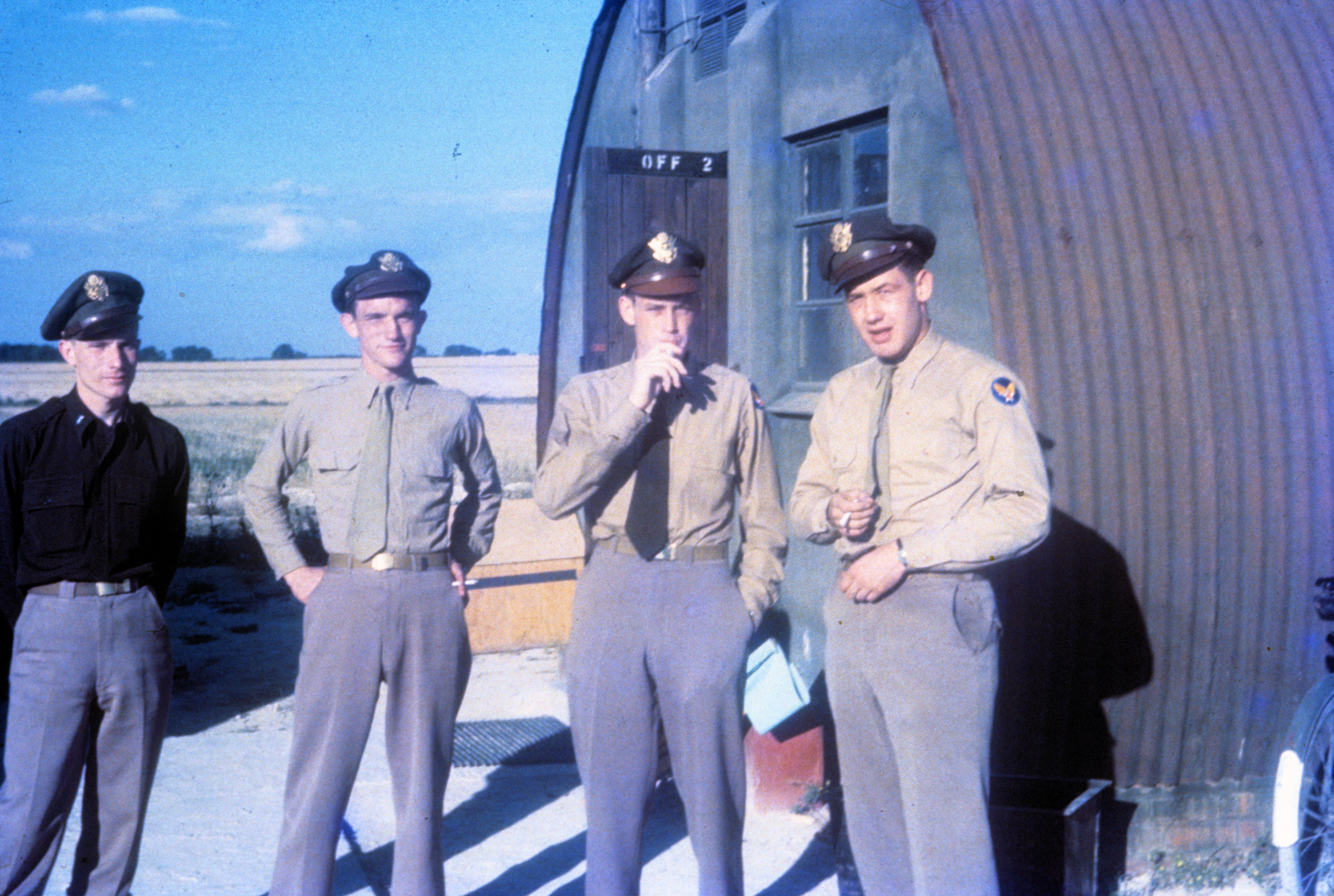
Four United States Army Air Force officers standing in front of a Nissen hut. Handwritten on slide: "Paul Fickel, Bernie Allen, Anthony Hawkins, Ethelbert Graham 503FS Fowlmere James G. Robinson".

When the airfield was turned over to the USAAF, Fowlmere was expanded to meet the requirements of a complete fighter group. The airfield was assigned USAAF designation Station 378 It was allocated to the United States Army Air Forces Eighth Air Force fighter command.

USAAF Station Units assigned to RAF Fowlmere were:

- 314th Service Group
- 467th Service Squadron; HHS 314th Service Group
- 331st Service Group
- 464th and 465th Service Squadrons; HHS 331s Service Group
- 18th Weather Squadron
- 72nd Station Complement Squadron
- 861st Engineer Aviation Battalion
- 1178th Quartermaster Company
- 1786th Ordnance Supply & Maintenance Company
- 989th Military Police Company
- 2120th Engineer Fire Fighting Platoon

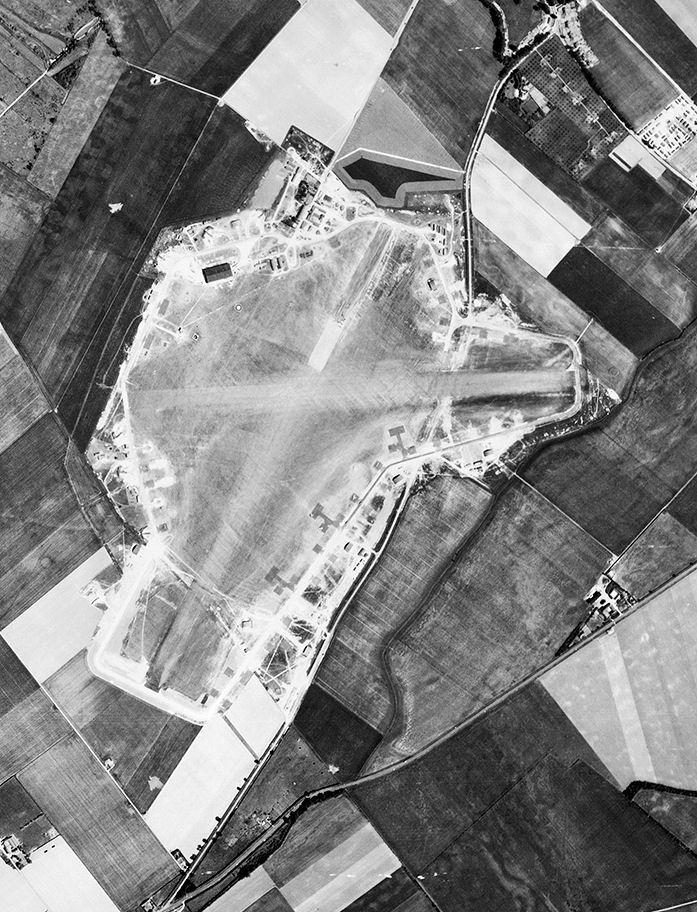
Aerial photograph (31 May 1944)

The 339th Fighter Group arrived at Fowlmere from Rice AAF, California on 4 April 1944. The group was under the command of the 66th Fighter Wing of the VIII Fighter Command. Aircraft of the group were identified by a red/white chequerboard pattern.

=== Postwar Royal Air Force use ===
With the departure of the Americans following the end of the war, Fowlmere was used by No. 11 Group RAF RAF Fighter Command until January 1946. It was then closed and placed into care and maintenance status, before being sold back to local farmers in 1957. The airfield's concreted areas and buildings of were ground into aggregate and sold for use in local construction projects.

== Current use ==
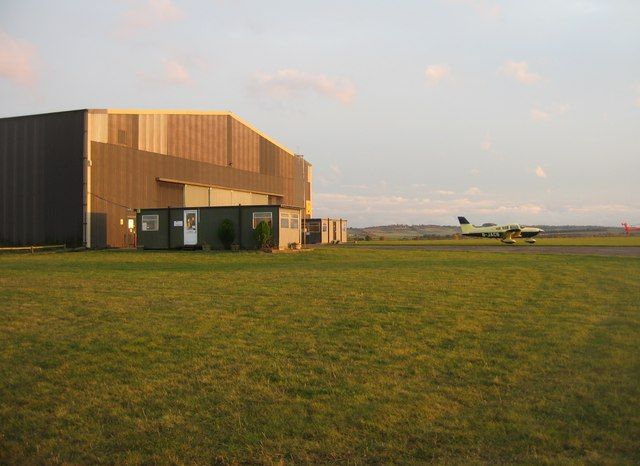
The hangar at Fowlmere in 2008

The airfield is in active use, with new management as of November 2020. It is home to the British Aerobatic Academy and the Modern Air flying club. There is a grass runway 07/25, with PPR (Prior Permission Required) necessary to land.

Fowlmere Airfield Museum is on-site, open one Sunday per month.

== See also ==
- List of former Royal Air Force stations

== Sources ==
- Jefford, C G (1988). RAF Squadrons. A comprehensive record of the movement and equipment of all RAF squadrons and their antecedents since 1912. Shrewsbury: Airlife. ISBN 978-1-85310-053-6.
- USAAS-USAAC-USAAF-USAF Aircraft Serial Numbers--1908 to present
- 339th Fighter Group on www.littlefriends.co.uk
