= Neupré =

Municipality in Liège Province, Wallonia, Belgium

Neupré Li Noûpré (Walloon)
- Municipality
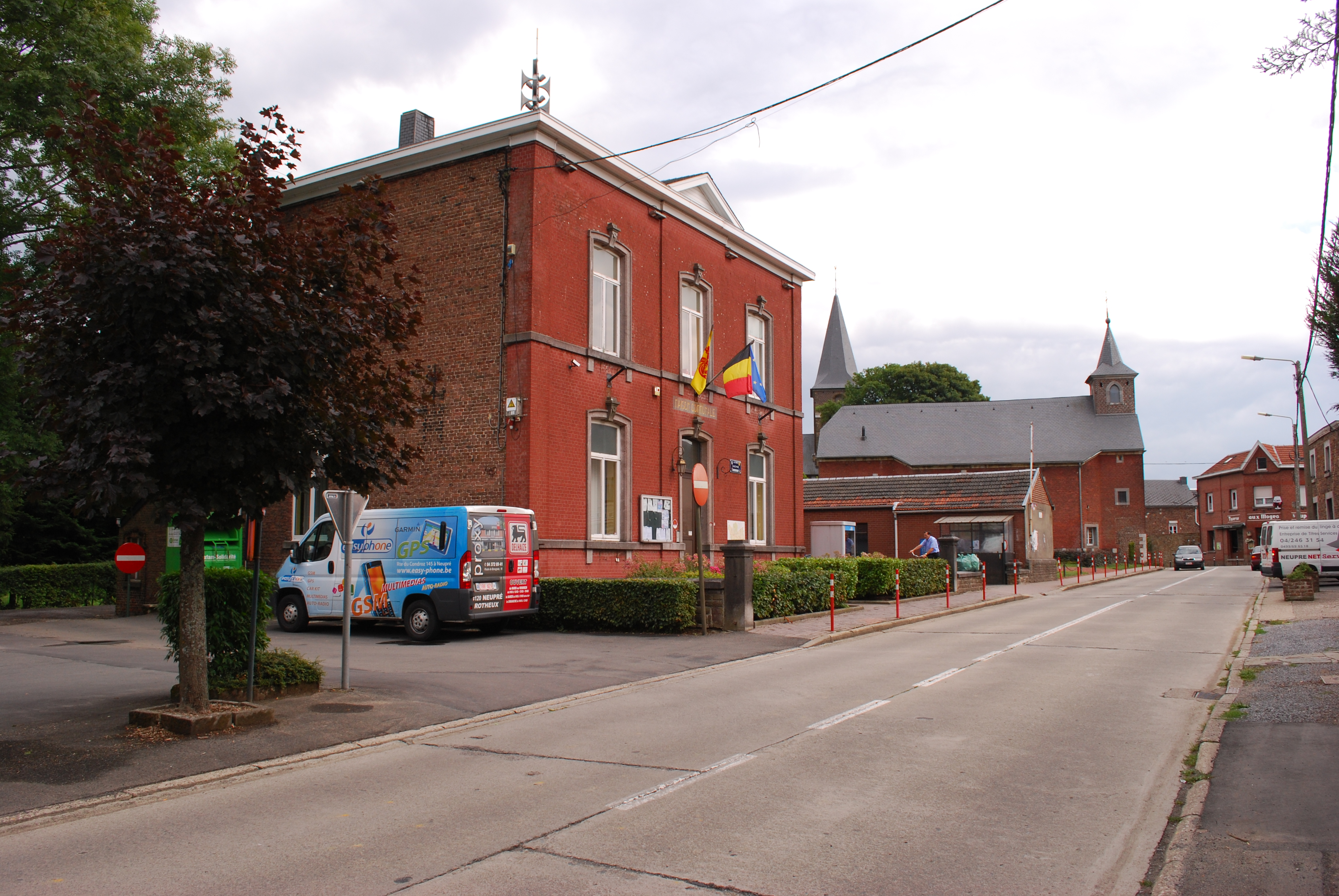

- Location of Neupré in Liège province
- Interactive map of Neupré
- Location in Belgium
- Coordinates: 50°32′N 05°29′E
- Country: Belgium
- Community: French Community
- Region: Wallonia
- Province: Liège
- Arrondissement: Liège

Government
  - Mayor: Virginie Defrang-Firket (MR)
  - Governing parties: MR, PS

Area
  - Total: 31.74 km^{2} (12.25 sq mi)

Population (2018-01-01)
  - Total: 9,934
  - Density: 313.0/km^{2} (810.6/sq mi)
- Postal codes: 4120-4122
- NIS code: 62121
- Area codes: 04
- Website: www.neupre.be

Neupré (French pronunciation: [nøpʁe]; Walloon: Li Noûpré) is a municipality of Wallonia located in the province of Liège, Belgium.

On January 1, 2006, Neupré had a total population of 9,798. The total area is 31.69 km^{2} which gives a population density of 309 inhabitants per km^{2}.

The municipality consists of the following districts: Éhein, Neuville-en-Condroz, Plainevaux, and Rotheux-Rimière. The name of Neupré is coined on the first letters of the districts : NEUville, Plainevaux, Rotheux and Éhein.

On the southeast edge of Neupré lies the Ardennes American Cemetery and Memorial, the resting place of over 5,000 American soldiers who died in Northern Europe during World War II.

== Politics and administration ==
=== List of mayors ===
- 1977-1982 : Pierre Maystadt (Neupré Uni)
- 1983-1992 : Pol Aimont (PRL)
- 1992-1994 : Jean-Pascal D'Inverno (PSC-Intérêts communaux)
- 1995-2000 : Josée Pagnoul-Demet (PS)
- 2001-2017 : Arthur Cortis (PS)
- Since the 16/6/2017 : Virginie Defrang-Firket (MR)

=== Municipal council ===

PS: 4 seats
Ecolo: 3 seats
MR: 10 seats
Newpré: 4 seats

== See also ==
- List of protected heritage sites in Neupré
