= List of United States Air Force installations =

This is a list of installations operated by the United States Air Force located within the United States and abroad. Locations where the Air Force have a notable presence but do not operate the facility are also listed.

== Background ==
The location and number of US Air Force installations has fluctuated according to the size of the Air Force, the capabilities of available weapon systems, and the strategies contemplated for their employment. The number of active duty Air Force Bases within the United States rose from 115 in 1947 to peak at 162 in 1956 before declining to 69 in 2003 and 59 in 2020. This change reflects a Cold War expansion, retirement of much of the strategic bomber force, and the post–Cold War draw-down. Over time, the USAF has constantly realigned its forces within the network of bases to reflect current needs and strategies.

The Air Force use several terms to identify the different type of installations it operates:

- Air Force Base, Air Reserve Base or Air Guard Base are used to describe an installation from which aircraft operations can be conducted or from which major activities of importance to Air Force combat, combat support, or training missions can be supported.
- Air Force Station (sometimes Air Station), Air Reserve Station or Air National Guard Station is used to name installations, typically but not exclusively without a flying mission, that are operated by a unit of at least squadron size, that does not otherwise meet the criteria of being a base.
- Air Force Auxiliary Airfield is used if the installation has an aircraft operating area that provides operational activities in support of a primary installation and depends upon a primary installation for administrative and logistical support.
- Air Base is typically but not always used to name an installation located outside the United States or its territories.

Active duty Installations are normally named after notable Air Force personnel, whereas Air Force Reserve and Air National Guard installations are either named in the same manner or after the community in which they are located.

== United States ==
Installations and locations in the contiguous United States. For Alaska and Hawaii see Pacific, East Asia and South East Asia section.

=== Active Duty ===
Active-duty USAF bases in the United States are under the jurisdiction of the following Major Commands. There are 57 Active Bases across the country in 2011:

US Air Force installations located within mainland United States. Joint bases with an air force presence are prefixed JB.

Air Combat Command
Air Education and Training Command
Air Force Global Strike Command

Air Force Materiel Command
Air Force Special Operations Command

Air Mobility Command
Direct Reporting Units

Active Duty US Air Force installations and locations within the contiguous United States
Name	Location	State or area	Coordinates	Commanding organization	Wing or unit emblem	Host wing or primary unit	Primary missions and units
Altus Air Force Base	Altus	Oklahoma	34°39′59″N 099°16′05″W	Air Education and Training Command		97th Air Mobility Wing	The 97th Air Mobility Wing trains crews to operate the C-17A Globemaster III, KC-135R Stratotanker and KC-46A Pegasus.
Joint Base Anacostia-Bolling	Southwest	Washington, D.C.	38°50′34″N 077°00′58″W	Air Force District of Washington		11th Wing	USAF operated joint base. The 11th Wing provides base administration and support to tenants including the USAF Honor Guard and USAF Band, which support ceremonial operations in the National Capital Region.
Joint Base Andrews-Naval Air Facility Washington	Camp Springs	Maryland	38°48′39″N 076°52′01″W	Air Force District of Washington		316th Wing	USAF operated joint base. The 316th Wing provides administrative and operational support in the National Capital Region and operates the UH-1N Iroquois. The 89th Airlift Wing is assigned a variety of aircraft including two VC-25A (Air Force One) in the Special Air Mission role, providing support to US political and military leaders. Other USAF flying units include the 459th Air Refueling Wing (KC-135R Stratotanker) and the D.C. Air National Guard's 113th Wing (F-16C/D Fighting Falcon, C-38A Courier and C-40C).
Arnold Air Force Base	near Tullahoma	Tennessee	35°23′33″N 086°05′09″W	Air Force Materiel Command		Arnold Engineering Development Complex	Non-flying installation, part of the Air Force Test Center. It operates more than 68 aerodynamic and propulsion wind tunnels, rocket and turbine engine test cells, space environmental chambers, arc heaters, and ballistic ranges.
Barksdale Air Force Base	Bossier City	Louisiana	32°30′07″N 093°39′46″W	Air Force Global Strike Command		2nd Bomb Wing	The 2nd Bomb Wing and 307th Bomb Wing operate the B-52H Stratofortress. Also home to the headquarters of Air Force Global Strike Command and the Eighth Air Force.
Beale Air Force Base	Waldo Junction	California	39°08′10″N 121°26′11″W	Air Combat Command		9th Reconnaissance Wing	The USAF's high-altitude Intelligence, Surveillance and Reconnaissance hub, operating the U-2S Dragon Lady, RQ-180, RQ-4B Global Hawk and T-38A Talon. The 940th Air Refueling Wing operates the KC-135R Stratotanker.
Cannon Air Force Base	Clovis	New Mexico	34°22′58″N 103°19′20″W	Air Force Special Operations Command		27th Special Operations Wing	One of four active duty special operations wings, operating the AC-130J Ghostrider, CV-22B Osprey, MQ-9A Reaper, MC-130J Commando II and U-28A Draco.
Joint Base Charleston	Charleston	South Carolina	32°53′55″N 080°02′26″W	Air Mobility Command		628th Air Base Wing	USAF operated joint base. The 437th Airlift Wing and 315th Airlift Wing operate the C-17A Globemaster III.
Columbus Air Force Base	Columbus	Mississippi	33°38′38″N 088°26′38″W	Air Education and Training Command		14th Flying Training Wing	Provides specialized undergraduate pilot training in the T-1A Jayhawk, T-6A Texan II and T-38C Talon
Creech Air Force Base	Indian Springs	Nevada	36°35′14″N 115°40′24″W	Air Combat Command		432nd Wing	The USAF's primary remotely piloted aircraft system (drone) base. The 432nd Wing is supported by the Air Force Reserve's 926th Wing and the Nevada Air National Guard's 232nd Operations Squadron, all operating the MQ-9A Reaper.
Davis–Monthan Air Force Base	Tucson	Arizona	32°09′59″N 110°52′59″W	Air Combat Command		355th Fighter Wing	The 355th Fighter Wing operates the A-10C Thunderbolt II (both for training and operationally), the HH-60G Pave Hawk and HC-130J Combat King II. Other flying units include the 55th Electronic Combat Group (EC-130H Compass Call), 920th Rescue Wing (HH-60G), 924th Fighter Group (A-10C) and the Arizona Air National Guard's 214th Attack Group (MQ-9A Reaper). The base is known for its aircraft storage facility, operated by the 309th Aerospace Maintenance and Regeneration Group and is also the headquarters of the Twelfth Air Force (Air Forces Southern).
Dover Air Force Base	Dover	Delaware	39°07′42″N 075°27′53″W	Air Mobility Command		436th Airlift Wing	The 436th Airlift Wing and 512th Airlift Wing operate the C-17A Globemaster III and C-5M Super Galaxy in the tactical and strategic airlift role. The base also hosts the Charles C. Carson Center for Mortuary Affairs.
Dyess Air Force Base	Abilene	Texas	32°25′15″N 099°51′17″W	Air Force Global Strike Command		7th Bomb Wing	The B-1B Lancer strategic bomber is operated by the 7th Bomb Wing and 307th Bomb Wing. Dyess is also home to the 317th Airlift Wing flying the C-130J Super Hercules.
Edwards Air Force Base	Edwards	California	34°54′20″N 117°53′01″W	Air Force Materiel Command		412th Test Wing	The USAF's primary test and evaluation base and home of the Air Force Test Center. A wide range of aircraft are operated by the 412th Test Wing, Air Force Test Pilot School, 31st Test and Evaluation Squadron and Air Force Operational Test and Evaluation Center. Edwards also hosts NASA's Armstrong Flight Research Center.
Eglin Air Force Base	Valparaiso	Florida	30°29′N 086°32′W	Air Force Materiel Command		96th Test Wing	The USAF's test and evaluation center for air-delivered weapons, navigation and guidance systems, command and control systems, and Air Force Special Operations Command systems (96th Test Wing) as well as electronic warfare, armament and avionics, chemical defense, reconnaissance, and aircrew training devices (53rd Wing). Both wings operates the A-10C Thunderbolt II, F-15C/D/E Eagle and F-16C/D Fighting Falcon. The 33rd Fighter Wing trains F-35A Lightning II pilots from US and foreign air-arms.
Ellsworth Air Force Base	Box Elder	South Dakota	44°08′42″N 103°06′13″W	Air Force Global Strike Command		28th Bomb Wing	The B-1B Lancer strategic bomber is operated by the 28th Bomb Wing. Ellsworth also hosts the 89th Attack Squadron which flies the MQ-9A Reaper.
Francis E. Warren Air Force Base	Cheyenne	Wyoming	41°07′59″N 104°52′01″W	Air Force Global Strike Command		90th Missile Wing	LGM-30G Minuteman III base with launch facilities throughout south-east Wyoming, western Nebraska, and northern Colorado, supported by the wing's UH-1N Iroquois helicopters. It hosts the headquarters of the Twentieth Air Force, which is responsible for the USAF's Intercontinental Ballistic Missiles (ICBMs).
Fairchild Air Force Base	Spokane	Washington	47°36′54″N 117°39′20″W	Air Mobility Command		92nd Air Refueling Wing	The 92nd Air Refueling Wing and the 141st Air Refueling Wing of the Washington Air National Guard operate the KC-135R Stratotanker. Also hosts the USAF Survival, Evasion, Resistance and Escape (SERE) School, which is supported by UH-1N Iroquois operated by the 36th Rescue Squadron.
Fort George G. Meade	Odenton	Maryland	39°6′25″N 76°44′35″W	Air Combat Command		70th Intelligence, Surveillance and Reconnaissance Wing	US Army installation hosting USAF intelligence units carrying out signals intelligence and cryptologic operations.
Gila Bend Air Force Auxiliary Field	Gila Bend	Arizona	32°53′15″N 112°43′12″W	Air Education and Training Command		56th Range Management Office	Geographically Separate Unit of the 56th Fighter Wing at Luke AFB, located within the Barry M. Goldwater Air Force Range.
Goodfellow Air Force Base	San Angelo	Texas	31°25′46″N 100°23′56″W	Air Education and Training Command		17th Training Wing	Non-flying installation delivering cryptologic, intelligence, and other training to US and allied military and US government students.
Grand Forks Air Force Base	Grand Forks	North Dakota	47°57′40″N 097°24′04″W	Air Combat Command		319th Reconnaissance Wing	The 319th Reconnaissance Wing operates the RQ-4B Global Hawk in the high-altitude intelligence, surveillance and reconnaissance role.
Hanscom Air Force Base	Lincoln	Massachusetts	42°28′12″N 071°17′21″W	Air Force Materiel Command		66th Air Base Group	Non-flying installation, hosting the Electronic Systems Center, part of the Air Force Life Cycle Management Center.
Hill Air Force Base	Ogden	Utah	41°07′26″N 111°58′22″W	Air Force Materiel Command		75th Air Base Wing	The USAF's second largest base, home to the Ogden Air Logistics Complex, the 748th Supply Chain Management Group and several directorates of the Air Force Life Cycle Management Center and Air Force Nuclear Weapons Center. The 388th Fighter Wing and 419th Fighter Wing operate the F-35A Lightning II.
Homey Airport	Groom Lake	Nevada	37°14′0″N 115°48′30″W	Air Force Materiel Command		Air Force Test Center (Detachment 3)	Classified test facility popularly known as Area 51, located within the Nevada Test and Training Range.
Holloman Air Force Base	Alamogordo	New Mexico	32°51′09″N 106°06′23″W	Air Education and Training Command		49th Wing	The 49th Wing trains crews to operate the MQ-9A Reaper and F-16C/D Fighting Falcon. Also home to the 704th Test Group which performs high speed sled track testing, navigation and guidance system testing, radar signature measurements and weapon systems flight testing. The group also operates the C-12J Huron and T-38C Talon.
Hurlburt Field	Mary Esther	Florida	30°25′40″N 086°41′22″W	Air Force Special Operations Command		1st Special Operations Wing	Home to the 1st Special Operations Wing, 24th Special Operations Wing, 492nd Special Operations Wing, Headquarters Air Force Special Operations Command and several special forces training and test & evaluation units. Aircraft flown includes the AC-130J Ghostrider, CV-22B Osprey, MC-130J Commando II, MQ-9A Reaper and U-28A Draco. 505th Command and Control Wing provides training and testing for command and control systems.
Keesler Air Force Base	Biloxi	Mississippi	30°24′41″N 088°55′25″W	Air Education and Training Command		81st Training Wing	The 81st Training Wing provides a wide range of non-flying technical training. Also home to the 403rd Wing operating the WC-130J Super Hercules & C-130J Super Hercules and the Headquarters of the Second Air Force.
Kegelman Air Force Auxiliary Field	Cherokee	Oklahoma	36°44′17″N 098°07′34″W	Air Education and Training Command		71st Flying Training Wing	Airfield used for training by T-1A Jayhawk, T-6A Texan II and T-38C Talon aircraft of the 71st Flying Training Wing at Vance AFB.
Kirtland Air Force Base	Albuquerque	New Mexico	35°02′25″N 106°36′33″W	Air Force Materiel Command		377th Air Base Wing	Center for research, development and testing of non-conventional weapons, space and missile technology and laser warfare. Home to the Air Force Nuclear Weapons Center, Air Force Safety Center and Air Force Operational Test and Evaluation Center. The 58th Special Operations Wing and the New Mexico Air National Guard's 150th Special Operations Wing train special operations crews to operate the CV-22B Osprey, HC-130J Combat King II, MC-130J Commando II, HH-60G Pave Hawk and UH-1N Iroquois.
Joint Base Langley–Eustis	Hampton	Virginia	37°04′58″N 076°21′38″W	Air Combat Command		633rd Air Base Wing	USAF operated joint base. Home to the 1st Fighter Wing and the Virginia Air National Guard's 192d Fighter Wing, both flying the F-22A Raptor. The base also hosts the headquarters of Air Combat Command, the 363rd Intelligence, Surveillance, and Reconnaissance (ISR) Wing and the 480th ISR Wing.
Laughlin Air Force Base	Del Rio	Texas	29°21′34″N 100°46′41″W	Air Education and Training Command		47th Flying Training Wing	Operates the T-1A Jayhawk, T-38C Talon and T-6A Texan II in the pilot training role.
Joint Base Lewis-McChord	Tacoma	Washington	47°08′51″N 122°28′46″W	Air Mobility Command		627th Air Base Group	US Army operated joint base. The 62nd Airlift Wing and 446th Airlift Wing operate the C-17A Globemaster III. The Washington Air National Guard operates the Western Air Defense Sector.
Little Rock Air Force Base	Jacksonville	Arkansas	34°55′01″N 092°08′47″W	Air Mobility Command		19th Airlift Wing	The 189th Airlift Wing and the Arkansas Air National Guard's 314th Airlift Wing deliver training to C-130 Hercules aircrews from across the US military and allied nations, whereas the 19th Airlift Wing and 913th Airlift Group fly the Hercules operationally.
Luke Air Force Base	Glendale	Arizona	33°32′06″N 112°22′59″W	Air Education and Training Command		56th Fighter Wing	The 56th Fighter Wing (the largest fighter wing in the USAF) and the 944th Fighter Wing train pilots to operate the F-16 Fighting Falcon and F-35A Lightning II.
MacDill Air Force Base	Tampa	Florida	27°50′58″N 082°31′16″W	Air Combat Command		6th Air Refueling Wing	Home to the 6th Air Refueling Wing and 927th Air Refueling Wing operating the KC-135R Stratotanker. Also home to the headquarters of US Central Command and US Special Operations Command.
Malmstrom Air Force Base	Great Falls	Montana	47°30′17″N 111°11′14″W	Air Force Global Strike Command		341st Missile Wing	LGM-30G Minuteman III base with launch facilities throughout central Montana, supported by the 582nd Helicopter Group's UH-1N Iroquois helicopters.
Maxwell Air Force Base	Montgomery	Alabama	32°22′45″N 086°21′45″W	Air Education and Training Command		42nd Air Base Wing	Headquarters of Air University. The 908th Airlift Wing (AFRES) is transitioning from the C-130H Hercules to the MH-139 Grey Wolf Helicopter.
McConnell Air Force Base	Wichita	Kansas	37°37′23″N 097°16′02″W	Air Mobility Command		22d Air Refueling Wing	The 22nd Air Refueling Wing and 931st Air Refueling Wing operate the KC-135R/T Stratotanker. The Kansas Air National Guard's 184th Wing performs a variety of roles including intelligence, surveillance and reconnaissance and cyber warfare.
Joint Base McGuire–Dix–Lakehurst	Trenton	New Jersey	40°01′09″N 074°31′22″W	Air Mobility Command		87th Air Base Wing	USAF operated joint base. The 305th Air Mobility Wing and 514th Air Mobility Wing operate the C-17A Globemaster III and KC-10A Extender. Also home to the New Jersey Air National Guard's 108th Wing operating the KC-135R Stratotanker. The 621st Contingency Response Wing is part of the USAF Expeditionary Center which is also based there.
Minot Air Force Base	Minot	North Dakota	48°24′57″N 101°21′29″W	Air Force Global Strike Command		5th Bomb Wing	The 5th Bomb Wing operate the B-52H Stratofortress. The 91st Missile Wing man LGM-30G Minuteman III launch facilities throughout North Dakota, supported by the 582nd Helicopter Group's UH-1N Iroquois helicopters
Moody Air Force Base	Valdosta	Georgia	30°58′4″N 83°11′34″W	Air Combat Command		23rd Wing	The 23rd Wing operates the A-10C Thunderbolt II, HC-130J Combat King II and HH-60G Pave Hawk in the close air support and combat search and rescue roles. Other units include The 476th Fighter Group also operates the A-10A and the 93rd Air Ground Operations Wing provides force protection capability.
Mountain Home Air Force Base	Mountain Home	Idaho	43°02′37″N 115°52′21″W	Air Combat Command		366th Fighter Wing	The 366th Fighter Wing operates the F-15E Strike Eagle.
Nellis Air Force Base	Las Vegas	Nevada	36°14′10″N 115°02′03″W	Air Combat Command		99th Air Base Wing	Home of the USAF Warfare Center, the air force's advanced air combat training center, comprising the 53rd Test and Evaluation Group, the 57th Wing and US Air Force Weapons School. The 563rd Rescue Group, 926th Wing and the USAF Air Demonstration Squadron (Thunderbirds) are also based at Nellis.
North Auxiliary Airfield	North	South Carolina	33°37′01″N 081°04′59″W	Air Mobility Command		628th Civil Engineer Squadron	Geographically Separate Unit of the 628th Air Base Wing at Joint Base Charleston, utilised for training by C-17A Globemaster III aircraft of the 437th and 315th Airlift Wings.
Offutt Air Force Base	Bellevue	Nebraska	41°07′10″N 095°54′31″W	Air Combat Command		55th Wing	The 55th Wing and Nebraska Air National Guard's 170th Group operate a range of OC-135, RC-135 and WC-135 aircraft in the intelligence gathering, reconnaissance and surveillance roles. Offut is also home to the 557th Weather Wing and 595th Command and Control Group operating the E-4B Advanced Airborne Command Post and the headquarters of US Strategic Command.
Pope Field	Fayetteville	North Carolina	35°10′15″N 079°00′52″W	Air Mobility Command		43rd Air Mobility Operations Group	US Army installation (part of Fort Bragg) hosting the USAF's 43rd Air Mobility Operations Group, 18th Air Support Operations Group and several units of Air Force Special Operations Command.
Robins Air Force Base	Warner Robins	Georgia	32°38′24″N 083°35′30″W	Air Force Materiel Command		78th Air Base Wing	The Warner Robins Air Logistics Complex is the primary logistics support depot for the F-15 Eagle, C-130 Hercules, C-5M Galaxy and C-17A Globemaster III. Robins is also home to various directorates of the Air Force Life Cycle Management Center, the headquarters of Air Force Reserve Command and the 461st Air Control Wing & 116th Air Control Wing (Georgia Air National Guard) both operating the E-8C JSTARS.
Rome Research Site	Rome	New York	43°13′16.9″N 75°24′30.8″W	Air Force Materiel Command		AFRL Information Directorate	Non-flying installation, home to the Information Directorate of Air Force Research Laboratory (AFRL).
Joint Base San Antonio	San Antonio	Texas	29°26′56″N 098°26′56″W	Air Education and Training Command		502nd Air Base Wing	USAF operated joint base across several sites. JBSA-Randolph is home to the 12th Flying Training Wing and provides s undergraduate pilot training, flying the T-6A Texan II, T-1A Jayhawk and T-38C Talon. JBSA-Lackland is a non-flying facility that provides basic and technical training and Kelly Field Annex is home to the 149th Fighter Wing (F-16C/D Fighting Falcon) 433rd Airlift Wing (C-5M Galaxy).
Scott Air Force Base	Belleville	Illinois	38°32′43″N 089°50′07″W	Air Mobility Command		375th Air Mobility Wing	The 375th Air Mobility Wing operates the C-21A Learjet, C-40C Clipper and KC-135R Stratotanker. The Illinois Air National Guard's 126th Air Refueling Wing also operates the KC-135R and the 932nd Airlift Wing the C-40C. Also home to the headquarters of Air Mobility Command and the Eighteenth Air Force.
Seymour Johnson Air Force Base	Goldsboro	North Carolina	35°20′22″N 077°57′38″W	Air Combat Command		4th Fighter Wing	The 4th Fighter Wing and 414th Fighter Group operate the F-15E Strike Eagle and the 916th Air Refueling Wing the KC-135R Stratotanker.
Shaw Air Force Base	Sumter	South Carolina	33°58′23″N 080°28′22″W	Air Combat Command		20th Fighter Wing	The 20th Fighter Wing operates the F-16C/D Fighting Falcon and the 25th Attack Group the MQ-9A Reaper. Also home to the headquarters of the Ninth Air Force.
Sheppard Air Force Base	Wichita Falls	Texas	33°59′20″N 098°29′31″W	Air Education and Training Command		82nd Training Wing	The 82nd Training Wing provides ground technical training, whilst the 80th Flying Training Wing and 340th Flying Training Group provide flying training and operate the T-6A Texan II and T-38C Talon.
Tinker Air Force Base	Oklahoma City	Oklahoma	35°24′53″N 097°23′12″W	Air Force Materiel Command		72nd Air Base Wing	The Oklahoma City Air Logistics Complex is the primary logistics support depot for B-1B Lancer, B-2A Spirit, B-52H Stratofortress, KC-135R Stratotanker and E-3 Sentry. The 552nd Air Control Wing and 513th Air Control Group operate the E-3 Sentry and the 507th Air Refueling Wing the KC-135R Stratotanker.
Tonopah Test Range Airport	Tonopah	Nevada	37°47′41″N 116°46′43″W	Air Combat Command		30th Reconnaissance Squadron	The 30th Reconnaissance Squadron is a Geographically Separate Unit of the 432nd Wing and operates the RQ-170 Sentinel UAV.
Travis Air Force Base	Fairfield	California	38°15′46″N 121°55′39″W	Air Mobility Command		60th Air Mobility Wing	The 60th Air Mobility Wing and 349th Air Mobility Wing operate the C-5M Galaxy, C-17A Globemaster III and KC-10A Extender. Also home to the David Grant USAF Medical Center.
Tyndall Air Force Base	Panama City	Florida	30°4′43″N 85°34′35″W	Air Combat Command		325th Fighter Wing	The 325th Fighter Wing and 44th Fighter Group operate the F-22A Raptor and T-38A/B/C Talon and the 82nd Aerial Targets Squadron a range of drone targets. Also home to the headquarters of the First Air Force and the 601st Air and Space Operations Center, providing Command and control for air defense, homeland security and civil support missions for North American Aerospace Defense Command (NORAD).
United States Air Force Academy	Colorado Springs	Colorado	38°59′25″N 104°51′30″W	Chief of Staff of the Air Force		10th Air Base Wing	Military academy for the US Air Force and US Space Force. It is both a military organization and a university, much of which is set up like most other Air Force bases, but the Superintendent, Commandant, Dean of Faculty and cadet wing are set up like a civilian university. The 306th Flying Training Group operates a variety of light training aircraft and gliders.
Vance Air Force Base	Enid	Oklahoma	36°20′22″N 097°55′02″W	Air Education and Training Command		71st Flying Training Wing	71st Flying Training Wing and 5th Flying Training Squadron provide undergraduate pilot training, flying the T-1A Jayhawk, T-6A Texan II and T-38C Talon. T-38C Talon.
Whiteman Air Force Base	Knob Noster	Missouri	38°43′49″N 093°32′53″W	Air Force Global Strike Command		509th Bomb Wing	The 509th Bomb Wing and the Missouri Air National Guard's 131st Bomb Wing operates the B-2A Spirit, T-38A Talon. Other units include the 442nd Fighter Wing (A-10C Thunderbolt II) and the 20th Attack Squadron (MQ-9A Reaper).
Wright-Patterson Air Force Base	Dayton	Ohio	39°49′23″N 084°02′58″W	Air Force Materiel Command		88th Air Base Wing	Headquarters of Air Force Materiel Command, supporting a wide range of logistics, research & development and acquisition activities. Organisations include the Air Force Life Cycle Management Center, Air Force Research Laboratory, Air Force Institute of Technology and the National Air and Space Intelligence Center. The 445th Airlift Wing operates the C-17A Globemaster III. Also home to the National Museum of the US Air Force.

=== Air National Guard and Air Force Reserve ===
Air National Guard units are a reserve military force composed of state Air National Guard members or federally recognized units and report to the governor of their respective state, territory (Puerto Rico, Guam, Virgin Islands) or the commanding general of the District of Columbia National Guard. Each of the 54 Air National Guard organizations is supervised by the adjutant general of the state or territory, Air Force Reserve units are aligned under Fourth Air Force, Tenth Air Force and Twenty-Second Air Force of the Air Force Reserve Command. The command has Fighter, Air Refueling and Airlift units, and is administratively responsible for all the Air Force's individual mobilization augmentees.

US Air Force Reserve and Air National Guard installations located within mainland United States. Joint Reserve Bases with an Air Force presence will include JRB or JRS. This map does not include Active Duty Air Force Installations with an Air Force Reserve or Air National Guard presence.

Air Force Reserve Command

Air National Guard

Air National Guard and Air Force Reserve installations and locations within the contiguous United States
Name	Location	State	Coordinates	Commanding organization	Wing or unit emblem	Host wing or primary unit	Primary missions and units
Abston Air National Guard Station	Montgomery	Alabama	32°21′22″N 086°20′48″W	Alabama Air National Guard		226th Combat Communications Group	Non-flying installation. The 226th Combat Communications Group operates in the combat communications role.
Atlantic City Air National Guard Base	Egg Harbor	New Jersey	39°26′53″N 074°34′54″W	New Jersey Air National Guard		177th Fighter Wing	Airfield shared with Atlantic City International Airport. The 177th Fighter Wing operates the F-16C Fighting Falcon multi-role fighter.
Bangor Air National Guard Base	Bangor	Maine	44°48′51″N 068°49′51″W	Maine Air National Guard		101st Air Refueling Wing	Airfield shared with Bangor International Airport. The 101st Air Refueling Wing operates the KC-135R Stratotanker.
Barnes Air National Guard Base	Westfield	Massachusetts	42°09′56″N 072°43′14″W	Massachusetts Air National Guard		104th Fighter Wing	Airfield shared with Westfield-Barnes Regional Airport. The 104th Fighter Wing operates the F-15C Eagle air superiority fighter.
Battle Creek Air National Guard Base	Springfield	Michigan	42°18′26.2″N 85°15′05.3″W	Michigan Air National Guard		110th Wing	Airfield shared with W. K. Kellogg Airport. The 110th Wing operates the MQ-9A Reaper.
Berry Field Air National Guard Base	Nashville	Tennessee	36°07′36″N 86°40′55″W	Tennessee Air National Guard		118th Wing	Airfield shared with Nashville International Airport. The 118th Wing operates the MQ-9A Reaper and also performs in the intelligence, cyber systems and intelligence, surveillance and reconnaissance (ISR) roles.
Biddle Air National Guard Base	Horsham Township	Pennsylvania	40°11′59″N 075°08′53″W	Pennsylvania Air National Guard		111th Attack Wing	The 111th Attack Wing operates the MQ-9A Reaper.
Bradley Air National Guard Base	Windsor Locks	Connecticut	41°56′20″N 72°41′0″W	Connecticut Air National Guard		103rd Airlift Wing	Airfield shared with Bradley International Airport. The 103rd Airlift Wing operates the C-130H Hercules in the airlift role.
Brunswick Air National Guard Station	Dock Junction	Georgia	31°14′51.9″N 81°29′09″W	Georgia Air National Guard		224th Joint Communications Support Squadron	Non-flying installation. The 224th Joint Communications Support Squadron is a Geographically Separate Unit of the 165th Airlift Wing and provides deployable tactical communications for Joint and Special Operations Task Force Headquarters.
Burlington Air National Guard Base	Burlington	Vermont	44°28′22″N 073°08′48″W	Vermont Air National Guard		158th Fighter Wing	Airfield shared with Burlington International Airport. The 158th Fighter Wing operates the F-35A Lightning II multi-role fighter.
Camp Murray Air National Guard Station	Tacoma	Washington	47°7′5″N 122°33′36″W	Washington Air National Guard		194th Wing	Camp Murray is located adjacent to Joint Base Lewis–McChord, Washington. It is home to the Washington Joint Forces Headquarters, including: the Washington Army National Guard, the Washington State Guard, the Washington Air National Guard, and the Washington State Emergency Operations Center.
Camp Rilea	Warrenton	Oregon	46°7′45″N 123°56′38″W	Oregon Air National Guard		116th Air Control Squadron	Oregon National Guard Training Complex under the jurisdiction of the Oregon Military Department, the 116th Air Control Squadron provides command and control capabilities for Oregon's North Coast emergency response and recovery operations.
Capital Airport Air National Guard Station	Springfield	Illinois	39°50′39″N 089°40′41″W	Illinois Air National Guard		183d Wing	Airfield shared with Abraham Lincoln Capital Airport. The 183d Wing is a Centralized Intermediate Repair Facility which repairs and maintains General Electric F110 engines used in the Air Force's F-16 Fighting Falcon.
Channel Islands Air National Guard Station	Oxnard	California	34°06′54″N 119°06′37″W	California Air National Guard		146th Airlift Wing	Airfield shared with Naval Air Station Point Mugu. The 146th Airlift Wing operates the C-130J Super Hercules in the airlift and aerial firefighting roles, also home to the 562nd Air Force Band.
Charlotte Air National Guard Base	Charlotte	North Carolina	35°12′58″N 80°55′55″W	North Carolina Air National Guard		145th Airlift Wing	Airfield shared with Charlotte Douglas International Airport. The 145th Airlift Wing operates the C-17A Globemaster III in the airlift role.
Dallas Air Guard Station	Grand Prairie	Texas	32°44′24″N 096°58′12″W	Texas Air National Guard		254th Combat Communications Group	Non-flying installation, forming part of the Grand Prairie Armed Forces Reserve Complex. Geographically Separate Unit of the 136th Airlift Wing.
Des Moines Air National Guard Base	Des Moines	Iowa	41°32′18″N 093°39′34″W	Iowa Air National Guard		132nd Wing	Airfield shared with Des Moines International Airport. The 132nd Wing operates the MQ-9A Reaper.
Dobbins Air Reserve Base	Marietta	Georgia	33°54′55″N 084°30′59″W	Air Force Reserve Command		94th Airlift Wing	The 94th Airlift Wing operates the C-130H Hercules in the airlift role, also home to the headquarters of the Twenty-Second Air Force
Duke Field	Crestview	Florida	30°39′01″N 086°31′22″W	Air Force Reserve Command		919th Special Operations Wing	The 919th Special Operations Wing and elements of the 492nd Special Operations Wing operate the C-146A Wolfhound. Elements of the 96th Operations Group operate a range of special operations aircraft in the test and evaluation role.
Duluth Air National Guard Base	Duluth	Minnesota	46°50′32″N 92°11′37″W	Minnesota Air National Guard		148th Fighter Wing	Airfield shared with Duluth International Airport. The 177th Fighter Wing operates the F-16C Fighting Falcon multi-role fighter.
Eastern Air Defense Sector	Rome	New York	43°12′59.8″N 75°24′17.4″W	New York Air National Guard		224th Air Defense Group	Non-flying installation. Air defence command and control unit permanently assigned to NORAD and manned by the New York Air National Guard's 224th Air Defense Group.
Ebbing Air National Guard Base	Fort Smith	Arkansas	35°20′12″N 94°22′03″W	Arkansas Air National Guard		188th Wing	Airfield shared with Fort Smith Regional Airport. The 188th Wing operates the MQ-9A Reaper and also performs in the intelligence, surveillance and reconnaissance (ISR) role.
Ellington Field Joint Reserve Base	Houston	Texas	29°36′26″N 95°09′32″W	Texas Air National Guard		147th Attack Wing	Airfield shared with Ellington Airport. The 147th Attack Wing operates the MQ-9A Reaper.
Fargo Air National Guard Base	Fargo	North Dakota	46°55′14″N 096°48′57″W	North Dakota Air National Guard		119th Wing	Airfield shared with Hector International Airport. The 119th Wing operates the MQ-9A Reaper.
Forbes Field Air National Guard Base	Topeka	Kansas	38°57′04″N 095°39′57″W	Kansas Air National Guard		190th Air Refueling Wing	Airfield shared with Topeka Regional Airport. The 190th Air Refueling Wing operates the KC-135 Stratotanker.
Fort Bliss	El Paso	Texas	31°48′7″N 106°25′29″W	Texas Air National Guard		204th Security Forces Squadron	An Active Duty US Army Installation hosting a Geographically Separate Unit of the 149th Fighter Wing. The 204th Security Forces Squadron specifically occupies Biggs Army Airfield and operates as the only heavy weapons Security Forces unit in the Air National Guard.
Fort Dodge Air National Guard Station	Fort Dodge	Iowa	42°33′02.5″N 94°10′45.3″W	Iowa Air National Guard		133rd Test Squadron	Non-flying installation. The 133rd Test Squadron provides testing and evaluation of command, control, communications, computers and Intelligence, Surveillance, and Reconnaissance (ISR) systems.
Fort Wayne Air National Guard Base	Fort Wayne	Indiana	40°58′42″N 085°11′42″W	Indiana Air National Guard		122nd Fighter Wing	Airfield shared with Fort Wayne International Airport. The 122nd Fighter operates the A-10C Thunderbolt II.
Naval Air Station Joint Reserve Base Fort Worth	Fort Worth	Texas	32°46′09″N 097°26′30″W	Various		N/A	US Navy operated joint reserve base. Air Force Reserve Command's 301st Fighter Wing operates the F-16C Fighting Falcon and the Texas Air National Guard's 136th Airlift Wing operates the C-130 Hercules. Home to headquarters of the Tenth Air Force.
Francis S. Gabreski Air National Guard Base	Westhampton Beach	New York	40°50′13″N 072°38′32″W	New York Air National Guard		106th Rescue Wing	Airfield shared with Francis S. Gabreski Airport. The 106th Rescue Wing operates the HC-130J Combat King II and HH-60G Pave Hawk in the combat search and rescue role.
Fresno Air National Guard Base	Fresno	California	36°46′34″N 119°43′50″W	California Air National Guard		144th Fighter Wing	Airfield shared with Fresno Yosemite International Airport. The 104th Fighter Wing operates the F-15C Eagle air superiority fighter.
General Mitchell Air National Guard Base	Milwaukee	Wisconsin	42°56′50″N 087°53′48″W	Wisconsin Air National Guard		128th Air Refueling Wing	Airfield shared with Milwaukee Mitchell International Airport. The 128th Air Refueling Wing operates the KC-135R Stratotanker.
Gowen Field Air National Guard Base	Boise	Idaho	43°33′52″N 116°13′22″W	Idaho Air National Guard		124th Fighter Wing	Airfield shared with Boise Airport. The 124th Fighter Wing operates the A-10C Thunderbolt II.
Great Falls Air National Guard Base	Great Falls	Montana	47°28′55.20″N 111°22′14.46″W	Montana Air National Guard		120th Airlift Wing	Airfield shared with Great Falls International Airport. The 120th Airlift Wing operates the C-130H Hercules.
Greeley Air National Guard Station	Greeley	Colorado	40°25′25.8″N 104°38′24.6″W	Colorado Air National Guard		233rd Space Group	Non-flying installation. The 233rd Space Group provides a mobile ground system (MGS) missile warning capability.
Grissom Air Reserve Base	Kokomo	Indiana	40°38′53″N 086°09′08″W	Air Force Reserve Command		434th Air Refueling Wing	The 434th Air Refueling Wing operates the KC-135R Stratotanker.
Goldwater Air National Guard Base	Phoenix	Arizona	33°25′36″N 112°00′43″W	Arizona Air National Guard		161st Air Refueling Wing	Airfield shared with Phoenix Sky Harbor International Airport. The 161st Air Refueling Wing operates the KC-135R Stratotanker.
Gulfport Combat Readiness Training Center	Gulfport	Mississippi	30°24′26″N 089°04′12″W	Mississippi Air National Guard		N/A	Hosts regular deployments of Army and Air Force national guard units, offering training airspace over an area directly adjacent to the Gulf of Mexico. Home of the 209th Special Operations Civil Engineer Squadron and 255th Air Control Squadron.
Hall Air Guard Station	Dothan	Alabama	31°19′46.7″N 85°27′57.2″W	Alabama Air National Guard		280th Special Operations Communications Squadron	Non-flying installation. Geographically Separate Unit of the 226th Combat Communications Group, providing provide strategic air defense & sovereignty and air tactical warning & assessment to NORAD.
Hancock Field Air National Guard Base	Syracuse	New York	43°06′41″N 076°07′25″W	New York Air National Guard		174th Attack Wing	Airfield shared with Syracuse Hancock International Airport. The 174th Attack Wing operates the MQ-9A Reaper. Also home to the 274th Air Support Operations Squadron.
Harrisburg Air Station Middletown	Middletown	Pennsylvania	40°11′37″N 076°45′48″W	Pennsylvania Air National Guard		193rd Special Operations Wing	Airfield shared with Harrisburg International Airport. 193rd Special Operations Wing operates the EC-130J Commando Solo in the psychological operations (PSYOP) role.
Homestead Air Reserve Base	Homestead	Florida	25°29′18″N 080°23′01″W	Air Force Reserve Command		482nd Fighter Wing	The 482nd Fighter Wing and 367th Fighter Squadron operate the F-16C/D Fighting Falcon whereas a detachment of the 125th Fighter Wing operates the F-15C Eagle.
Hulman Field Air National Guard Base	Terre Haute	Indiana	39°27′05″N 087°18′27″W	Indiana Air National Guard		181st Intelligence Wing	Non-flying installation. The 181st Intelligence Wing monitors, process, exploits, and disseminates near real-time information from unmanned aerial vehicles operating globally.
Jackson Air National Guard Base	Jackson	Mississippi	32°18′40″N 090°04′33″W	Mississippi Air National Guard		172nd Airlift Wing	Airfield shared with Jackson–Medgar Wiley Evers International Airport. The 172nd Airlift Wing operates the C-17A Globemaster III.
Jacksonville Air National Guard Base	Jacksonville, Florida	Florida	30°29′39″N 081°41′16″W	Florida Air National Guard		125th Fighter Wing	Airfield shared with Jacksonville International Airport. The 125th Fighter Wing operates the F-15C Eagle air superiority fighter.
Jefferson Barracks Air National Guard Station	St Louis	Missouri	38°30′14.3″N 90°16′48.9″W	Missouri Air National Guard		157th Air Operations Group	Non-flying installation within the Jefferson Barracks Military Post. Geographically Separate Unit of the 131st Bomb Wing, providing a command and control (C2) capability.
Joe Foss Field Air National Guard Station	Sioux Falls	South Dakota	43°34′55″N 096°44′31″W	South Dakota Air National Guard		114th Fighter Wing	Airfield shared with Sioux Falls Regional Airport. The 114th Fighter Wing operates the F-16C Fighting Falcon multi-role fighter.
Johnstown Air National Guard Station	Johnstown	Pennsylvania	40°19′23.5″N 78°50′15.7″W	Pennsylvania Air National Guard		258th Air Traffic Control Squadron	Operates the air traffic control service at Johnstown-Cambria County Airport.
Key Field Air National Guard Base	Meridian	Mississippi	32°19′57″N 088°45′07″W	Mississippi Air National Guard		186th Air Refueling Wing	Airfield shared with Meridian Regional Airport. The 186th Air Refueling Wing operates the KC-135R Stratotanker. Also home to the 238th Air Support Operations Squadron and 248th Air Traffic Control Squadron.
Kingsley Field Air National Guard Base	Klamath Falls	Oregon	42°09′22″N 121°43′59″W	Oregon Air National Guard		173rd Fighter Wing	Airfield shared with Klamath Falls Airport. The 173rd Fighter Wing trains Air National Guard and active duty F-15 Eagle pilots. Also home to the 270th Air Traffic Control Squadron.
Lincoln Air National Guard Base	Lincoln	Nebraska	40°51′04″N 096°45′33″W	Nebraska Air National Guard		155th Air Refueling Wing	Airport shared with Lincoln Airport. The 155th Air Refueling Wing operates the KC-135R Stratotanker.
Louisville Air National Guard Base	Louisville	Kentucky	38°10′41″N 85°43′29″W	Kentucky Air National Guard		123rd Airlift Wing	Airport shared with Louisville International Airport. The 123rd Airlift Wing operates the C-130H Hercules. Also home to the 123rd Special Tactics Squadron.
Mansfield Lahm Air National Guard Base	Mansfield	Ohio	40°48′49″N 82°31′00″W	Ohio Air National Guard		179th Airlift Wing	Airfield shared with Mansfield Lahm Regional Airport. The 179th Airlift Wing operates the C-130H Hercules.
March Joint Air Reserve Base	Riverside	California	33°52′50″N 117°15′34″W	Air Force Reserve Command		452nd Air Mobility Wing	The 452nd Air Mobility Wing operates the C-17A Globemaster III and KC-135R Stratotanker. The base also hosts the California Air National Guard's 163rd Attack Wing ( MQ-9A Reaper), the 912th Air Refueling Squadron (KC-135R) and the headquarters of the Fourth Air Force.
McEntire Joint National Guard Base	Eastover	South Carolina	33°55′15″N 080°48′04″W	South Carolina Air National Guard		169th Fighter Wing	The 169th Fighter Wing operates the F-16C Fighting Falcon multi-role fighter.
McGhee Tyson Air National Guard Base	Knoxville	Tennessee	35°48′39″N 083°59′38″W	Tennessee Air National Guard		134th Air Refueling Wing	Airfield shared with McGhee Tyson Airport. The 134th Air Refueling Wing operates the KC-135R Stratotanker. Also home to the 119th Command and Control Squadron and the I.G. Brown Training and Education Center, which is a detachment of the Air National Guard Readiness Center.
McLaughlin Air National Guard Base	Charleston	West Virginia	38°22′23″N 81°35′35″W	West Virginia Air National Guard		130th Airlift Wing	Airfield shared with Yeager Airport. The 130th Airlift Wing operates the C-130 J-30 Super Hercules.
Memphis Air National Guard Base	Memphis	Tennessee	35°02′33″N 089°58′36″W	Tennessee Air National Guard		164th Airlift Wing	Airfield shared with Memphis International Airport. The 164th Airlift Wing operates the C-17A Globemaster III.
Minneapolis-Saint Paul Joint Air Reserve Station	Minneapolis – Saint Paul	Minnesota	44°52′54″N 093°14′01″W	Air Force Reserve Command		934th Airlift Wing	Airfield shared with Minneapolis-Saint Paul International Airport. The 934th Airlift Wing and the Minnesota Air National Guard's 133rd Airlift Wing operates the C-130 Hercules.
Moffett Federal Airfield	Mountain View	California	37°24′54″N 122°02′54″W	California Air National Guard		129th Rescue Wing	NASA operated airfield. The 129th Rescue Wing operates the HC-130J Combat King II and HH-60G Pave Hawk in the combat search and rescue role.
Montgomery Air National Guard Base	Montgomery	Alabama	32°18′16″N 086°24′01″W	Alabama Air National Guard		187th Fighter Wing	Airfield shared with Montgomery Regional Airport. The 187th Fighter Wing operate the F-16C Fighting Falcon multi-role fighter. In 2020, Montgomery ANG base was announced to have been selected as a base for the F-35A Lightning II, which would replace the F-16C.
Morris Air National Guard Base	Tucson	Arizona	32°06′55″N 110°55′50″W	Arizona Air National Guard		162nd Fighter Wing	Airfield shared with Tucson International Airport. The 162nd Fighter Wing operates the F-16C Fighting Falcon multi-role fighter.
New Castle Air National Guard Base	New Castle	Delaware	39°41′07″N 075°35′57″W	Delaware Air National Guard		166th Airlift Wing	Airfield shared with New Castle Airport. The 166th Airlift Wing operates the C-130H Hercules.
New London Air National Guard Base	New London	North Carolina	35°25′06.9″N 80°08′30″W	North Carolina Air National Guard		N/A	Airfield shared with Stanly County Airport. Home of the 263rd Combat Communications Squadron, 235th Air Traffic Squadron and 118th Air Support Operations Squadron, all Geographically Separate Units of the 145th Airlift Wing.
Naval Air Station Joint Reserve Base New Orleans	Belle Chasse	Louisiana	29°49′31″N 090°02′06″W	Louisiana Air National Guard		159th Fighter Wing	US Navy operated joint reserve base. The 159th Fighter Wing operates the F-15C/D Eagle.
Niagara Falls Air Reserve Station	Niagara Falls	New York	43°06′48″N 078°56′51″W	Air Force Reserve Command		914th Air Refueling Wing	Airfield shared with Niagara Falls International Airport. The 914th Air Refueling Wing operates the KC-135R Stratotanker and the New York Air National Guard's 107th Attack Wing the MQ-9A Reaper.
North Highlands Air National Guard Station	Sacramento, California	California	38°38′24″N 121°24′09″W	California Air National Guard		162nd Combat Communications Group	Non-flying installation. The 162nd Combat Communications Group operates in the combat communications role.
North Smithfield Air National Guard Station	North Smithfield	Rhode Island	41°58′13″N 71°34′32.4″W	Rhode Island Air National Guard		282nd Combat Communications Squadron	Non-flying installation. The 282nd Combat Communications Squadron operates in the combat communications role.
Otis Air National Guard Base	Mashpee	Massachusetts	41°39′31″N 070°31′17″W	Massachusetts Air National Guard		102nd Intelligence Wing	Non-flying installation, part of Joint Base Cape Cod. The 102nd Intelligence Wing operates in the intelligence and command and control roles. The 267th Combat Communications Squadron deploys, operates and maintains strategic emergency communications.
Pease Air National Guard Base	Portsmouth	New Hampshire	43°04′41″N 070°49′24″W	New Hampshire Air National Guard		157th Air Refueling Wing	Airfield shared with Portsmouth International Airport at Pease. The 157th Air Refueling Wing operates the KC-46A Pegasus.
Peoria Air National Guard Base	Peoria	Illinois	40°39′38″N 089°41′44″W	Illinois Air National Guard		182nd Airlift Wing	Airfield shared with General Wayne A. Downing Peoria International Airport. The 182nd Airlift Wing operates the C-130H Hercules.
Peterson Space Force Base	Colorado Springs	Colorado	38°49′25″N 104°41′42″W	US Space Force		302nd Airlift Wing	US Space Force installation hosting the 302nd Airlift Wing operate the C-130H Hercules.
Pittsburgh International Airport Air Reserve Station	Pittsburgh	Pennsylvania	40°29′40.49″N 080°12′55.71″W	Air Force Reserve Command		911th Airlift Wing	Airfield shared with Pittsburgh International Airport. The 911th Airlift Wing operates the C-17A Globemaster III and the Pennsylvania Air National Guard's 171st Air Refueling Wing the KC-135R Stratotanker.
Portland Air National Guard Base	Portland	Oregon	45°34′56″N 122°35′23″W	Oregon Air National Guard		142nd Fighter Wing	Airfield shared with Portland International Airport. The 142nd Fighter Wing operates the F-15C/D Eagle air superiority fighter, also home to the 125th Special Tactics Squadron.
Quonset Point Air National Guard Station	North Kingstown	Rhode Island	41°35′50″N 071°24′44″W	Rhode Island Air National Guard		143rd Airlift Wing	Airfield shared with Quonset State Airport. The 143rd Airlift Wing operates the C-130J Super Hercules, also home to the 102nd Network Warfare Squadron.
Reno Air National Guard Base	Reno	Nevada	39°29′57″N 119°46′05″W	Nevada Air National Guard		152nd Airlift Wing	Airfield shared with Reno-Tahoe International Airport. The 152nd Airlift Wing operates the C-130H Hercules.
Rickenbacker Air National Guard Base	Columbus	Ohio	39°48′49″N 082°56′48″W	Ohio Air National Guard		121st Air Refueling Wing	Airfield shared with Rickenbacker International Airport. The 121st Air Refueling Wing operates the KC-135R Stratotanker.
Roland R. Wright Air National Guard Base	Salt Lake City	Utah	40°47′18″N 111°58′40″W	Utah Air National Guard		151st Air Refueling Wing	Airfield shared with Salt Lake City International Airport. The 151st Air Refueling Wing operates the KC-135R Stratotanker.
Rosecrans Air National Guard Base	St. Joseph	Missouri	39°46′19″N 94°54′34.94″W	Missouri Air National Guard		139th Airlift Wing	Airfield shared with Rosecrans Memorial Airport. The 139th Airlift Wing operates the C-130H Hercules.
San Diego Air National Guard Station	San Diego	California	32°50′10″N 117°9′38″W	California Air National Guard		147th Combat Communications Squadron	Non-flying installation home to a Geographically Separate Unit of the 195th Wing.
Savannah Air National Guard Base	Savannah	Georgia	32°07′39″N 081°12′7″W	Georgia Air National Guard		165th Airlift Wing	Airfield shared with Savannah/Hilton Head International Airport. The 165th Airlift Wing operates the C-130H Hercules, also home to the Air Dominance Center.
Schriever Space Force Base	Colorado Springs	Colorado	38°48′12″N 104°31′32″W	US Space Force		310th Space Wing	US Space Force installation, hosting the USAF's the Air Force Reserves 310th Space Wing.
Selfridge Air National Guard Base	Mount Clemens	Michigan	42°36′30″N 082°50′08″W	Michigan Air National Guard		127th Wing	The 127th Wing operates the KC-135R Stratotanker and A-10 Thunderbolt II.
Sepulveda Air National Guard Station	Van Nuys	California	34°11′09.4″N 118°28′48″W	California National Guard		261st Cyber Operations Squadron	Non-flying installation. Geographically Separate Unit of the 195th Wing.
Shepherd Field Air National Guard Base	Martinsburg	West Virginia	39°24′07″N 77°59′04″W	West Virginia Air National Guard		167th Airlift Wing	Airfield shared with Eastern West Virginia Regional Airport. The 167th Airlift Wing operates the C-17A Globemaster III.
Sioux City Air National Guard Base	Sioux City	Iowa	42°23′54″N 096°22′19″W	Iowa Air National Guard		185th Air Refueling Wing	Airfield shared with Sioux Gateway Airport. The 185th Air Refueling Wing operates the KC-135R Stratotanker.
South Portland Air National Guard Station	South Portland	Maine	43°38′00.9″N 70°18′58.7″W	Maine Air National Guard		N/A	Non-flying installation. Home to the 265th Combat Communications Squadron and 243rd Engineering and Installation Squadron, both Geographically Separate Units of the 101st Air Refueling Wing.
Springfield Air National Guard Base	Springfield	Ohio	39°50′25″N 083°50′25″W	Ohio Air National Guard		178th Wing	Airfield shared with Springfield-Beckley Municipal Airport. The 178th Wing operates the MQ-9A Predator.
Stewart Air National Guard Base	Newburgh	New York	41°30′15″N 74°06′17″W	New York Air National Guard		105th Airlift Wing	Airfield shared with Stewart International Airport. The 105th Airlift Wing operates the C-17A Globemaster III.
Stratton Air National Guard Base	Schenectady	New York	42°51′09″N 073°55′21″W	New York Air National Guard		109th Airlift Wing	Airfield shared with Schenectady County Airport. The 109th Airlift Wing is the only Air Force unit equipped with ski-equipped LC-130H Hercules for Arctic ice/snow landing missions in support of the National Science Foundation.
Sumpter Smith Air National Guard Base	Birmingham	Alabama	33°33′50″N 086°45′08″W	Alabama Air National Guard		117th Air Refueling Wing	The 117th Air Refueling Wing operates the KC-135R Stratotanker.
Toledo Air National Guard Base	Toledo	Ohio	41°35′12.5″N 83°48′28.2″W	Ohio Air National Guard		180th Fighter Wing	Airfield shared with Toledo Express Airport. The 180th Fighter Wing operates the F-16C Fighting Falcon multi-role fighter.
Truax Field Air National Guard Base	Madison	Wisconsin	43°08′23″N 089°20′15″W	Wisconsin Air National Guard		115th Fighter Wing	Airfield shared with Dane County Regional Airport. The 115th Fighter Wing operates the F-16C Fighting Falcon multi-role fighter. In 2020, Traux Field ANG base was announced to have been selected as a base for the F-35A Lightning II, which would replace the F-16C.
Tulsa Air National Guard Base	Tulsa	Oklahoma	36°11′54″N 095°53′17″W	Oklahoma Air National Guard		138th Fighter Wing	Airfield shared with Tulsa International Airport. The 138th Fighter Wing operates the F-16C Fighting Falcon multi-role fighter.
Volk Field Air National Guard Base	New Lisbon	Wisconsin	43°56′11″N 090°15′35″W	Wisconsin Air National Guard		Volk Field Combat Readiness Training Center	Home of one of four Air National Guard Combat Readiness Training Centers.
Volunteer Air National Guard Station	Chattanooga	Tennessee	35°4′24.91″N 85°9′48.6″W	Tennessee Air National Guard		241st Engineering Installation Squadron	A non-flying installation hosting a Geographically Separate Unit of the 134th Air Refueling Wing.
Warfield Air National Guard Base	Middle River	Maryland	39°19′32.38″N 76°24′49.55″W	Maryland Air National Guard		175th Wing	Airfield shared with Martin State Airport. The 175th Wing operates the A-10C Thunderbolt II.
Westover Air Reserve Base	Chicopee	Massachusetts	42°11′38″N 072°32′05″W	Air Force Reserve Command		439th Airlift Wing	The 439th Airlift Wing operates the C-5M Super Galaxy.
Will Rogers Air National Guard Base	Oklahoma City	Oklahoma	35°23′35″N 097°36′03″W	Oklahoma Air National Guard		137th Special Operations Wing	Airfield shared with Will Rogers World Airport. The 137th Special Operations Wing operates the MC-12W Liberty in the Intelligence, Surveillance & Reconnaissance (ISR) role.
Wyoming Air National Guard Base	Cheyenne	Wyoming	41°09′41″N 104°49′10″W	Wyoming Air National Guard		153d Airlift Wing	Airfield shared with Cheyenne Regional Airport. Operates the C-130H Hercules in the airlift and aerial firefighting roles. Also homes to the 243rd Air Traffic Control Squadron.
Youngstown Air Reserve Station	Youngstown	Ohio	41°15′38.64″N 80°40′44.74″W	Air Force Reserve Command		910th Airlift Wing	Airfield shared with Youngstown-Warren Regional Airport. The 910th Airlift Wing operates the C-130H Hercules in the aerial spray role.
Zanesville Air National Guard Base	Zanesville	Ohio	39°56′47.6″N 81°53′58.1″W	Ohio Air National Guard		220th Engineering Installation Squadron	Non-flying installation. Home to the 220th Engineering Installation Squadron, a Geographically Separate Unit of the 121st Air Refueling Wing.

== Overseas ==
=== Caribbean, Central America and South America ===
US Air Force operations in the Caribbean, Central America and South America are overseen by the Twelfth Air Force (Air Forces Southern). It is part of Air Combat Command and head-quartered at Davis-Monthan AFB in Arizona. It is the air component to US Southern Command, providing security-cooperation and air & cyberspace capabilities throughout its area of responsibility.

US Air Force installations and locations within the Caribbean, Central America and South America.

Main Operating Base

Forward Operating Location

Cooperative Security Location

Geographically Separate Unit

US Air Force installations and locations in the Caribbean, Central America and South America
Name	Location	Coordinates	Unit Emblem	Unit Designation	Notes/Mission
Guantanamo Bay Naval Base	Cuba	19°54′0″N 75°9′0″W		474th Air Expeditionary Squadron	Geographically Separate Unit of the 474th Air Expeditionary Group, supporting Joint Task Force Guantanamo (JTF-GTMO).
Hato International Airport	Curaçao	12°11′20″N 068°57′35″W		429th Expeditionary Operations Squadron	Forward Operating Location made available to the US by the Dutch government. Geographically Separate Unit of the 612th Theater Operation Group, supporting Joint Interagency Task Force South (JIATF South) counter-drug operations.
Muñiz Air National Guard Base	Puerto Rico	18°26′22″N 066°00′07″W		156th Wing	Airfield shared with Luis Muñoz Marín International Airport. The 156th Wing is a component of the Puerto Rico Air National Guard and operates the WC-130H Hercules.
Punta Borinquen Radar Station	Puerto Rico	18°29′6″N 67°8′56″W		141st Air Control Squadron	A Geographically Separate Unit of the 156th Operations Group, 156th Wing; the 141st Air Control Squadron is a mobile radar command, control, and communications element of the U.S. Air Force Theater Air Control System. Adjacent to former Ramey AFB (the former base itself is now Rafael Hernandez International Airport). The 141st Air Control Squadron is a component of the Puerto Rico Air National Guard.
Punta Salinas Air National Guard Station	Puerto Rico	18°22′30″N 066°15′42″W		156th Operations Group	A Geographically Separate Unit of the 156th Wing, the 156th Operations Group operates the combat communications and Host Nation Rider mission. The 156th Operations Group is a component of the Puerto Rico Air National Guard.
Queen Beatrix International Airport	Aruba	12°30′05″N 70°00′55″W		429th Expeditionary Operations Squadron	Forward Operating Location made available to the US by the Dutch government. Geographically Separate Unit of the 612th Theater Operation Group, supporting Joint Interagency Task Force South (JIATF South) counter-drug operations.
Soto Cano Air Base	Honduras	14°22′57″N 087°37′16″W		612th Air Base Squadron	Forward Operating Location made available to the US by the Honduras Government. Geographically Separate Unit of the 612th Theater Operation Group, supporting Joint Task Force Bravo (JTF-B).
St Croix Air National Guard Station	United States Virgin Islands	17°42′24.2″N 64°48′01.9″W		285th Civil Engineering Squadron	Non-flying station of the Virgin Islands Air National Guard.

=== Pacific, East Asia and South East Asia ===
PACAF's primary mission is to provide U.S. Pacific Command integrated expeditionary Air Force capabilities to defend the Homeland, promote stability, dissuade/deter aggression, and swiftly defeat enemies. PACAF traces its roots to the activation of Far East Air Forces, 3 August 1944, at Brisbane, Queensland, Australia. It consisted of three numbered air forces—5th, 7th and 13th—which were supporting combat operations in the Pacific Theater of World War II.

US Air Force installations located within the Pacific, East Asia and South East Asia. Diego Garcia is beyond the map boundary and therefore not shown.

Main Operating Base

Forward Operating Location

Geographically Separate Unit

US Air Force installations and locations in the Pacific, East Asia and South East Asia
Name	Location	Coordinates	Unit Emblem	Unit Designation	Notes/Mission
Andersen Air Force Base	Guam	13°34′34″N 144°55′28″E		36th Wing	Main Operating Base, part of Joint Region Marianias. Supports B-1B Lancer, B-2A Spirit, B-52G Stratofortress deployments, known as the Continuous Bomber Presence mission. The RQ-4B Global Hawk also operates from the base in the reconnaissance mission.
Air Station Barbers Point	United States (Hawaii)	21°18′26″N 158°04′13″W		297th Air Traffic Control Squadron	Airfield shared with Kalaeloa Airport and USCG Air Station Barbers Point. The 297th Air Traffic Control Squadron is a Geographically Separate Unit of the 154th Wing, Hawaii Air National Guard and it operates an Air Traffic Control mission.
Bellows Air Force Station	United States (Hawaii)	21°21′46.55″N 157°43′11.77″W		18th Force Support Squadron (Detachment 2)	A Geographically Separate Unit of the 18th Wing with a primary mission as an Armed Forces Recreation Center.
Eareckson Air Station	United States (Alaska)	52°42′44″N 174°06′49″E		Pacific Air Forces Regional Support Center	Contractor operated diversion airfield and AN/FPS-108 COBRA DANE surveillance radar.
Eielson Air Force Base	United States (Alaska)	64°39′56″N 147°06′05″W		354th Fighter Wing	Main Operating Base flying the F-16C/D Fighting Falcon, F-35A Lightning II, KC-135 Stratotanker and HH-60G Pave Hawk. Supports Red Flag – Alaska exercises.
Joint Base Elmendorf-Richardson	United States (Alaska)	61°15′05″N 149°48′23″W		673rd Air Base Wing	Joint USAF/US Army Main Operating Base. 3rd Wing F-22 Raptor air superiority fighter supports and defends U.S. interests in the Asia Pacific region and around the world. AK ANG 176th Wing operates eight C-130H Hercules aircraft. Also HQ of PACAF Eleventh Air Force, DOD Alaskan Command (ALCOM), Alaska NORAD Region.
Kadena Air Base	Japan	26°21′06″N 127°46′10″E		18th Wing	Main Operating Base, made available to the US by the Japanese Government. Home to the 18th Wing operating the F-15C/D Eagle, KC-135R Stratotanker, E-3B/C Sentry & HH-60G Pave Hawk and the 353rd Special Operations Group operating the MC-130J Commando II and CV-22B Osprey. The 82nd Reconnaissance Squadron flies the RC-135.
Kanoya Air Base	Japan	31°22′05″N 130°50′17″E		319th Expeditionary Reconnaissance Squadron	Japan Maritime Self-Defense Force base hosting a MQ-9A Reaper squadron operating in the intelligence, surveillance and reconnaissance role.
Kunsan Air Base	South Korea	35°54′13″N 126°36′57″E		8th Fighter Wing	Main Operating Base, made available to the US by the South Korean Government. The 8th Fighter Wing operates the F-16C/D Fighting Falcon.
Marine Corps Air Station Iwakuni	Japan	34°08′42″N 132°14′39″E		374th Communications Squadron (Operating Location Bravo)	US Marine Corps Air Station, made available to the US by the Japanese Government, hosting a Geographically Separate Unit of the 374th Airlift Wing.
Misawa Air Base	Japan	40°42′19″N 141°22′19″E		35th Fighter Wing	Main Operating Base, made available to the US by the Japanese Government. The 35th Fighter Wing operates the F-16CJ/DJ Fighting Falcon.
Naval Support Facility Diego Garcia	British Indian Ocean Territory	7°18′48″S 72°24′40″E		36th Mission Support Group (Detachment 1)	Forward Operating Location made available to the US by the UK Government, hosting a Geographically Separate Unit of the 36th Wing. Predominately used by deployments of the B-1B Lancer, B-2A Spirit and B-52H Stratofortress supporting operations in the Middle East.
Osan Air Base	South Korea	37°05′26″N 127°01′47″E		51st Fighter Wing	Main Operating Base, made available to the United States by the South Korean Government. Headquarters of the Seventh Air Force, with the 51st Fighter Wing operating the A-10C Thunderbolt II & F-16C/D Fighting Falcon, the 5th Reconnaissance Squadron operating the U-2S Dragon Lady and a detachment of the 33rd Rescue Squadron flying the HH-60G Pave Hawk.
Paya Lebar Airbase	Singapore	1°21′37″N 103°54′34″E		497th Combat Training Flight	Forward operating site, made available to the United States by the Singaporean Government. Besides being used by various flying units of United States Air Force and United States Navy (including United States Marine Corps Aviation) as a refueling stopover and staging post/transit point, the base is also used permanently by the 497th Combat Training Flight, a geographically separate unit of the 36th Wing.
Joint Base Pearl Harbor–Hickam	United States (Hawaii)	21°20′59″N 157°57′31″W		15th Wing	Joint USAF/US Navy Main Operating Base. 15th Wing F-22 Raptor air superiority fighter projects peace and power in the Pacific and beyond. Also 15th Wing (HI ANG), HQ Pacific Air Forces and Thirteenth Air Force.
United States Fleet Activities Sasebo	Japan	33°9′46″N 129°42′41″E		374th Communications Squadron (Operating Location Alpha)	Naval Base made available to the United States by the Japanese Government, hosting a Geographically Separate Unit of the 374th Airlift Wing.
Wake Island Airfield	United States Minor Outlying Islands	19°16′57″N 166°38′12″E		Pacific Air Forces Regional Support Center	Geographically Separate Unit providing a trans-Pacific refueling stop for military aircraft. Also supports Missile Defense Agency test activities.
Yokota Air Base	Japan	35°44′55″N 139°20′55″E		374th Airlift Wing	Main Operating Base, made available to the US by the Japanese Government. Headquarters of the Fifth Air Force, with the 374th Airlift Wing operating the C-130J Hercules, UH-1N Iroquois & C-12J Huron and the 21st Special Operations Squadron flying the CV-22B Osprey.

=== Europe and Africa ===
United States Air Forces in Europe – Air Forces Africa (USAFE-AFAFRICA) is a major command of the US Air Force and a component command of both US European Command (USEUCOM) and US Africa Command (USAFRICOM). The USAFE-AFAFRICA area of responsibility covers Europe, parts of Asia and all of Africa with the exception of Egypt, to achieve US national and NATO objectives based on taskings by the two combatant commanders.

USAFE-AFAFRICA has seven main operating bases and 114 geographically separate units. Although Akrotiri is within the USAFE-AFAFRICA area of responsibility, the units there are under the control of other major commands.

Installations and locations in the US Air Forces in Europe – Air Forces Africa (USAFE-AFAFRICA) area of responsibility. See table below for full list.

Main Operating Base

Forward Operating Location

Geographically Separate Unit

For a map of all USAF locations in the United Kingdom see United States Air Force in the United Kingdom.

US Air Force installations and locations in Europe and Africa
Name	Location	Coordinates	Unit Emblem	Unit Designation	Notes/Mission
Ämari Air Base	Estonia	59°15′44″N 024°13′07″E		52nd Expeditionary Operations Group (Detachment 2)	Estonian Air Force base hosting a Geographically Separate Unit of the 52nd Fighter Wing. Operates the MQ-9A Reaper in the intelligence, surveillance and reconnaissance role since June 2020 whilst the runway at Miroslawiec Air Base is resurfaced.
Ankara Support Facility	Turkey			717th Air Base Squadron	Geographically Separate Unit of the 39th Air Base Wing. Provides support to the US Embassy, Office of Defense Cooperation-Turkey, the Department of Defense Education Activity and the wider American community in Ankara.
Aviano Air Base	Italy	46°01′53″N 012°35′49″E		31st Fighter Wing	Main Operating Base flying the F-16C/D Fighting Falcon and HH-60G Pavehawk. The base is made available to the US by the Italian government.
Büchel Air Base	Germany	50°10′35″N 007°03′28″E		702nd Munitions Support Squadron	German Air Force base hosting a Geographically Separate Unit of the 52nd Fighter Wing. Responsible for receipt, storage, maintenance and control of US war reserve munitions in support of the German Air Force.
Camp Darby	Italy	43°38′0″N 10°19′0″E		731st Munitions Squadron	Italian owned base hosting a Geographically Separate Unit of the 52nd Fighter Wing. Responsible for receipt, storage, maintenance and control of US war reserve munitions.
Camp Lemonnier	Djibouti	11°32′37″N 43°8′55″E		449th Air Expeditionary Group	Forward Operating Site leased to the US by the Djibouti government, providing combat search and rescue (operating the HC-130J Combat King II and HH-60G Pave Hawk) and surveillance & reconnaissance capabilities for the Combined Joint Task Force – Horn of Africa.
Camp Simba	Kenya	2°09′56.8″S 40°53′40.1″E		475th Expeditionary Air Base Squadron	Forward Operating Site used by the US and Kenya Defence Forces. Geographically Separate Unit of the 435th Air Expeditionary Wing.
Câmpia Turzii (71st Air Base)	Romania	46°30′12″N 023°53′07″E		731st Expeditionary Attack Squadron	Romanian Air Force base hosting a Geographically Separate Unit of the 31st Fighter Wing. Operates the MQ-9A Reaper in the intelligence, surveillance and reconnaissance role since January 2021.
Chabelley Airfield	Djibouti	11°31′N 43°04′E		776th Expeditionary Air Base Squadron	Forward Operating Site used by the US and French military. Geographically Separate Unit of the 435th Air Expeditionary Wing.
Chièvres Air Base	Belgium	50°35′9.58″N 003°50′37.47″E		424th Air Base Squadron	Provides logistical support to NATO Headquarters and SHAPE. Geographically Separate Unit of the 86th Airlift Wing.
Einsiedlerhof Air Station	Germany	49°25′42.7″N 7°3′15.5″E		Warrior Preparation Center	Provides combat readiness training to US Air Forces in Europe – Air Forces Africa forces.
Ghedi Air Base	Italy	45°25′52.57″N 10°16′48.40″E		704th Munitions Support Squadron	Italian Air Force base hosting a Geographically Separate Unit of the 52nd Fighter Wing. Responsible for receipt, storage, maintenance and control of US war reserve munitions in support of the Italian Air Force.
Incirlik Air Base	Turkey	37°00′07″N 035°25′33″E		39th Air Base Wing	Main Operating Base supporting US and NATO operations in the USAFE-AFAFRICA and US Air Forces Central areas of responsibility. It is a joint Turkish/US operated base hosting the 447th Air Expeditionary Group operating the A-10C Thunderbolt II and KC-135R Stratotanker in support of Operation Inherent Resolve.
Izmir Air Station	Turkey	38°27′27″N 027°10′13″E		425th Air Base Squadron	Geographically Separate Unit of the 39th Air Base Wing. Acts as administrative agent and provides mission support for the NATO Allied Land Command Headquarters and six other associate units.
Kleine Brogel Air Base	Belgium	51°10′10.5″N 005°28′19″E		701st Munitions Support Squadron	Belgian Air Force base hosting a Geographically Separate Unit of the 52nd Fighter Wing. Responsible for receipt, storage, maintenance and control of US war reserve munitions in support of the Belgian Air Force.
Lajes Field	Azores	38°45′42″N 027°05′26″W		65th Air Base Group	Portuguese Air Force base hosting a Geographically Separate Unit of the 86th Airlift Wing. Provides base and en-route support to US aircraft making transatlantic flights. The group also operates a High Frequency Global Communications System station.
Łask Air Base	Poland	51°33′5.76″N 19°10′44.76″E		52nd Operations Group (Detachment 1)	Polish Air Force base hosting a Geographically Separate Unit of the 52nd Fighter Wing. Supports the European Reassurance Initiative and NATO readiness in eastern Europe. The base has hosted temporary deployments of aircraft including the A-10C Thunderbolt II, F-22A Raptor, F-16 Fighting Falcon, C-130 Hercules and KC-135R Stratotanker.
Morón Air Base	Spain	37°10′29″N 5°36′57″W		496th Air Base Squadron	Spanish Air Force base hosting a Geographically Separate Unit of the 86th Airlift Wing. Provides base and en-route support to aircraft making transatlantic flights.
NATO Air Base Geilenkirchen	Germany	50°57′39″N 6°2′33″E		470th Air Base Squadron	Geographically Separate Unit of the 52nd Fighter Wing. Provides support to USAF and other Department of Defense units throughout fourteen locations in Germany, the Netherlands, Belgium, and Italy.
RAF Akrotiri	Sovereign Base Areas of Akrotiri and Dhekelia	34°35′0″N 32°59′0″E		9th Operations Group (Detachment 1)	Royal Air Force base hosting a Geographically Separate Unit of the 9th Reconnaissance Wing, operating Lockheed U-2S.
RAF Alconbury	United Kingdom	52°22′15.27″N 000°13′36.94″W		501st Combat Support Wing	Non-flying base made available to the US by the UK Government, home to the headquarters of the 501st Combat Support Wing and 423rd Air Base Group, providing mission support to personnel at RAF Molesworth, RAF Menwith Hill and the NATO Joint Warfare Centre in Stavanger.
RAF Barford St John	United Kingdom	52°0′13″N 1°21′36″W		422nd Air Base Group	Non-flying base made available to the US by the UK Government. Operates as a signals intelligence relay station and operated remotely from RAF Croughton.
RAF Croughton	United Kingdom	51°59′15″N 1°11′10″W		422nd Air Base Group	Non-flying base made available to the US by the UK Government, hosting a Geographically Separate Unit of the 501st Combat Support Wing. Signals intelligence facility operated by the USAF and US intelligence agencies.
RAF Fairford	United Kingdom	51°40′56″N 1°47′24″W		420th Air Base Squadron	Forward Operating Location made available to the US by the UK Government, hosting a Geographically Separate Unit of the 501st Combat Support Wing. Predominately used by deployments of the B-1B Lancer, B-2A Spirit and B-52H Stratofortress. The Royal International Air Tattoo, the world's largest military air show, is held at Fairford annually in July.
RAF Feltwell	United Kingdom	52°28′46″N 0°31′9″E		18th Intelligence Squadron (Detachment 4)	Non-flying base made available to the US by the UK Government, hosting a Geographically Separate Unit of the 48th Fighter Wing which provides base support. Operated as a space intelligence facility by the 18th Intelligence Squadron (Detachment 4).
RAF Lakenheath	United Kingdom	52°24′30″N 000°33′24″E		48th Fighter Wing	Main Operating Base, made available to the US by the UK Government. Home to the 48th Fighter Wing operating the McDonnell Douglas F-15E Strike Eagle and the F35A Lightning II.
RAF Menwith Hill	United Kingdom	54°0′28.35″N 1°41′22.2″W		421st Air Base Squadron	Non-flying base, operating as a joint UK/US signals intelligence gathering station which functions primarily as a field station of the National Security Agency. Geographically Separate Unit of the 501st Combat Support Wing.
RAF Mildenhall	United Kingdom	52°21′54″N 000°28′51″E		100th Air Refuelling Wing	Main Operating Base, made available to the US by the UK Government. Home to the 100th Air Refuelling Wing operating the KC-135R Stratotanker and the 352nd Special Operations Wing operating the CV-22 Osprey & MC-130J Commando II. The 95th Reconnaissance Squadron supports RC-135 Rivet Joint and OC-135 Open Skies aircraft when deployed to Europe.
RAF Molesworth	United Kingdom	52°22′46″N 0°24′18″W		423rd Air Base Group	Non-flying base made available to the US by the UK Government. Geographically Separate Unit of the 501st Combat Support Wing. Home to the Joint Intelligence Operations Center Europe (JIOCEUR) Analytic Center operated by the Defense Intelligence Agency and the J2 Directorate which provides US Africa Command with intelligence.
RAF Welford	United Kingdom	51°28′6″N 1°24′13″W		420th Munitions Squadron	Non-flying base made available to the US by the UK Government. Geographically Separate Unit of the 501st Combat Support Wing, used as an ammunition depot in support of bombers operating from RAF Fairford.
Ramstein Air Base	Germany	49°26′38.10″N 007°36′08.13″E		86th Airlift Wing	Main Operating Base made available to the US by the German government. Home to the 86th Airlift Wing operating the C-130J Hercules, C-20H, C-21A & C-40B, the 435th Air Ground Operations Wing, 435th Air Expeditionary Wing and 521st Air Mobility Operations Wing. Also hosts the headquarters of US Air Forces in Europe – Air Forces Africa, the Third Air Force and NATO Allied Air Command.
Spangdahlem Air Base	Germany	49°58′33″N 006°41′50″E		52nd Fighter Wing	Main Operating Base made available to the US by the German government. Home to the 52nd Fighter Wing operating F-16CM/DM Fighting Falcon and the 726th Air Mobility Squadron.
Stavanger	Norway	58°54′27″N 5°43′18″E		426th Air Base Squadron	Geographically Separate Unit of the 501st Combat Support Wing. Non-flying base, providing support to personnel working at the NATO Joint Warfare Centre.
Volkel Air Base	Netherlands	51°39′26″N 5°41′27″E		703rd Munitions Support Squadron	Royal Netherlands Air Force base hosting a Geographically Separate Unit of the 52nd Fighter Wing. Responsible for receipt, storage, maintenance and control of US war reserve munitions in support of the Royal Netherlands Air Force.

=== Middle East, Central Asia and South Asia ===
US Air Force operations in the Middle East, Central Asia and part of South Asia are overseen by US Air Forces Central Command (USAFCENT). It is part of Air Combat Command and head-quartered at Shaw AFB in South Carolina. It is the air component to US Central Command, with a mission to deliver air power for the security and stability of the region. The USAFCENT area of responsibility covers Afghanistan, Bahrain, Egypt, Iran, Iraq, Jordan, Kazakhstan, Kuwait, Kyrgyzstan, Lebanon, Oman, Pakistan, Qatar, Saudi Arabia, Syria, Tajikistan, Turkmenistan, United Arab Emirates, Uzbekistan, and Yemen.

Throughout the 2010s, USAFCENT has supported the military intervention against the Islamic State of Iraq and Syria (Operation Inherent Resolve) and the NATO-led train, advise and assist mission in Afghanistan (Operation Resolute Support).

US Air Force installations and locations within the Middle East, Central Asia and South Asia.

Main Operating Base

Geographically Separate Unit

US Air Force installations and locations in the Middle East, Central Asia and South Asia
Name	Location	Coordinates	Unit Emblem	Host Wing or Primary Unit	Notes/Mission
Abdullah Al Mubarak Air Base (Cargo City)	Kuwait	29°13′36″N 047°58′48″E		387th Air Expeditionary Group	Geographically Separate Unit of the 386th Air Expeditionary Wing. Operates the Theater Logistics Gateway in support of operations in the Middle East.
Al Dhafra Air Base	United Arab Emirates	24°14′53″N 054°32′51″E		380th Air Expeditionary Wing	Main Operating Base made available to the US by the United Arab Emirates government. The 380th AEW provides air combat, aerial refueling and reconnaissance aircraft in the US Central Command area of responsibility in support of Operations Inherent Resolve and Resolute Support.
Al Udeid Air Base	Qatar	25°07′02″N 051°18′53″E		379th Air Expeditionary Wing	Main Operating Base made available to the US by the Qatari government. The 379th AEW is the largest expeditionary wing in the USAF and provides a wide range of combat air power and combat support for Operations Inherent Resolve and Resolute Support and Combined Joint Task Force – Horn of Africa. The base is the forward headquarters of US Central Command and home to the Combined Air Operations Center which co-ordinates operations in the Middle East.
Ali Al Salem Air Base	Kuwait	29°20′48″N 047°31′14″E		386th Air Expeditionary Wing	Main Operating Base made available to the US by the Kuwaiti government. The 386th AEW provides tactical airlift and combat service support for operations throughout the Middle East.
Ahmad al-Jaber Air Base	Kuwait	28°56′05.7″N 47°47′31.3″E		332nd Air Expeditionary Wing	Main Operating Base made available to the US by the Kuwaiti government. Supports operations throughout the Middle East.
Muwaffaq Salti Air Base	Jordan	31°50′03″N 036°47′14″E		407th Air Expeditionary Group	Air Base made available to the US by the Jordanian government hosting a Geographically Separate Unit of the 386th Air Expeditionary Wing supporting operations throughout the Middle East.
Prince Sultan Air Base	Saudi Arabia	24°03′19″N 047°33′49″E		378th Air Expeditionary Wing	Main Operating Base made available to the US by the Saudi government. Supports operations throughout the Middle East.

== See also ==
- List of former United States Army installations
- Lists of military installations
- List of United States Coast Guard installations
- List of United States Marine Corps installations
- List of United States military bases
- List of United States Navy installations
- List of United States Space Force installations
