= Round Tent, Yuba County, California =

Round Tent
- Former settlement
- Location in California
- Coordinates: 39°6′30.39″N 121°16′57.22″W
- Country: United States
- State: California
- County: Yuba County
- Time zone: UTC-8 (Pacific (PST))
  - Summer (DST): UTC-7 (PDT)

Round Tent is a former settlement in Yuba County, California. It was located 1.25 miles (2.0 km) east-southeast of Waldo Junction.

Round Tent was a hotel, stage stop, and mining camp, located in the East Bear River Township of Yuba County, California. It appears on the 1853 Canal map of Nevada County, the Township and County map of the central part of California of 1868, and on the 1887 official map of Yuba County, California, in Township 15N, Range 6E, Section 34.

The Round Tent Hotel and Station was established in 1851, by Jonathan Edwards Slater and his wife, Caroline F. (Powers) Slater. Prior to this, in 1850, and part of 1851, stages from Sacramento to Nevada City crossed the Bear river at Johnson's (Ranch), and came up by way of Watson's on Dry creek, Trip's place, and the Empire Ranch. When the Round Tent was put up in 1851, the route was changed, going from Johnson's (Ranch) over the hills, by way of Penn Valley, and past Round Tent. Horses were changed at Round Tent Station, on the Slater Ranch.

The Grass Valley Telegraph of 3 February 1854 wrote "Mr. and Mrs. Slater keep an excellent table and accommodations, and it is worth the time and expense of any one to ride down and spend a few days with this accommodating couple, who spare no time or effort in making their visitors comfortable."

A post office operated at Round Tent from June 21, 1853, to November 12, 1860, of which J. E. Slater was postmaster.

The Slaters

Jonathan Edwards Slater was born in New York on 21 Aug 1820. He died on 20 March 1881 at Round Tent, Yuba County, California. Caroline F. Powers was born in New York on 26 January 1826. She died on 16 January 1917, at Oakland, Alameda County, California. They are buried together in the Roseville, Placer County, California Public Cemetery.

They married on 2 January 1849, in Cook County, Illinois and the crossed the plains to California that year. They had no children.

J. E. Slater was president of the Union Valley Quartz Mining Co. which held a meeting at Slater's Round Tent House, on Thursday, February 15, 1854.

Mining

Considerable surface mining was done here. Mining had been done in the vicinity since 1850, and the ground had paid well, but in consequence of the scarcity of water little work had been done. An 1853 newspaper reported: "The diggings at Round Tent are in a most prosperous condition, and those that are mining are realizing from eight to ten dollars each. The gold is coarse, and superior to any other gold seen for some time. It has the appearance of Sonora gold, and sells for $17.50 per oz."

Few visible signs remain of the site, which is now located within the Spenceville Wildlife Area.
