= Waldo, California =

Waldo, California may refer to:

- Sausalito, California
- Waldo Junction, California
