= 149 Squadron =

149 Squadron or 149th Squadron may refer to:

- 149 Squadron (Israel)
- 149 Squadron, Republic of Singapore Air Force
- No. 149 Squadron RAF, United Kingdom
- 149th Aero Squadron, Air Service, United States Army
- 149th Fighter Squadron, United States Air Force
- 149th Combat Communications Squadron, United States Air Force
- VPB-149, United States Navy
