= Ontario Air National Guard Station =

Coordinates: 34°3′20″N 117°36′05″W

Ontario Air National Guard Station is a former California Air National Guard facility located alongside Ontario International Airport in Ontario, California.

== Airfield origins ==
Ontario Army Air Field was established before World War II. It is located in San Bernardino County, California, in the city of Ontario. This airport was most known for being the hub for the Los Angeles Basin. Its routes consisted mostly between San Bernardino and Riverside. In 1921, local pilots created a club called the Ontario Aircraft corporation to start flying the Jennie Bi-plane aircraft. This same organization classified a landing strip made from just dirt near the corner of Mission Boulevard and Grove Ave, people can see this today at the southwest corner.

== Ontario Army Air Field ==
The start of World War II meant that the airport was required for use by the United States Army Air Corps. This however helped the Airport expand by over 845 acres. This airport went from having pure dirt fields to concrete runways, a control tower for air traffic, and high tech landing gear. The cost was covered by the Works Progress Administration. They covered the east and west expansion of 6,200 feet and the northeast/southwest expansion 4,700 feet which was originally planned to last for 39 years. The final cost for two runways in the year 1942 as $350,000.

On 27 February 1942, an Army Air Corps plane made the first landing at the new airport. By 1943, the airport was an Army Air Corps Lockheed P-38 Lightning training base and North American P-51 Mustang operating base.

After the war, it was one of five large storage, sales, and scrapping centers for Army Air Forces aircraft established by the Reconstruction Finance Corporation.

The scene in which Dana Andrews visits the aircraft boneyard in the film The Best Years of Our Lives was filmed at the Ontario Army Airfield.

=== Units during World War II ===
Date Established	Unit
June–November 1942	Army Air Forces: 69th Reconnaissance Group
1 June 1943	Army Air Forces: Detachment 6, Fourth Air Force Replacement Depot Army Air Forces Weather Station (Type B) Medical Detachment Detachment, 1st Airways Communications Squadron, Regional Detachment, 1st Weather Squadron, Regional 11th Tow Target Squadron 123rd Reconnaissance Squadron (Bombardment) 311th Base Headquarters and Air Base Squadron Detachment 10, 854th Signal Service Company, Aviation Detachment 6, 904th Quartermaster Service Company, Aviation 1024th Guard Squadron Detachment 9, 2066th Ordnance Service Company, Aviation
11 October-7 December 1943	Army Air Forces: 364th Fighter Group:
27 February-31 March 1944 (Disbanded)	Army Air Forces: 329th Fighter Group:
7 April 1945	Army Air Forces: Third Echelon Repair Shop Section, 68th Army Air Forces Base Unit (1st Weather Region) Detachment, Section D, 85th Army Air Forces Base Unit (101st Army Airways Communications Service Squadron) 443rd Army Air Forces Base Unit (Combat Crew Training Station-Fighter) Women's Army Corps Squadron

== Air National Guard Station ==
In 1949, an Air National Guard training station was established at the former Ontario Army Air Field

In April 1949, the City of Ontario granted a lease for certain airport property to the U.S. Air Force, the site to be used by the California Air National Guard. An armory for the 149th Aircraft Control and Warning Squadron was constructed and later CA ANG activities had a major impact on the airport. In 1952, in response to the desire of the Air National Guard to base fighter aircraft there, the city initiated the first of the three runway extensions. After two additional runway extensions, the airport had a 10,000 foot runway to service both commercial and military traffic.

== The 1950s and onwards ==
The 1950s saw dynamic growth at Ontario International Airport (the airfield was designated "International" in 1946), with three major aircraft plants, including Lockheed, Douglas an, Northrop, having facilities at the airport.

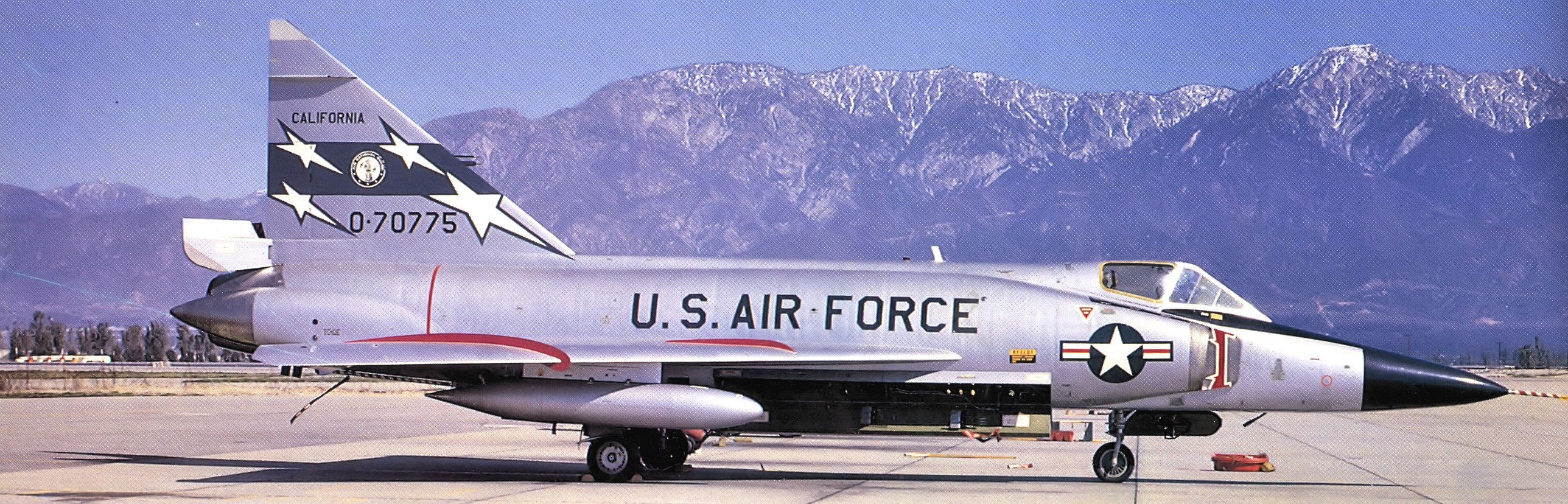
California Air National Guard 196th Fighter Interceptor Squadron Convair F-102A-90-CO Delta Dagger, AF Ser. No. 57-775, in 1970. This aircraft is now on static display at Clovis Park, California.

A second runway extension of 1,200 feet was completed in 1956 and permitted the Guard's speedy North American F-86 Sabres to land and take off at Ontario. The first extension (800 ft) came in 1952, and the third (1,800 ft) in 1962, each time to accommodate the faster aircraft being flown by what was by now the 163d Fighter Group of the California Air National Guard. All three runway extensions were funded by the Air National Guard as military construction (MILCON). The 163 FG flew F-86F aircraft from Ontario from 1956 to 1959, and F-86H aircraft from 1959 to 1965. In 1965, the unit transitioned to the F-102 Delta Dagger and in 1968 was renamed the 163d Fighter-Interceptor Group (163 FIG). Operationally-gained by the Aerospace Defense Command (ADC), the 163d continued to fill what was primarily a coastal air defense role for southern California, Nevada and Arizona. In 1975, the unit transitioned to the O-2 Skymaster forward air control aircraft and was re-designated as the 163d Tactical Air Support Group (163 TASG), with operational claimancy transferred from ADC to Tactical Air Command (TAC).

In 1982, in preparation for transition to the McDonnell Douglas F-4 Phantom II and return to its earlier designation as the 163d Fighter Group, the 163 TASG transferred to March AFB in nearby Riverside. Non-flying CA ANG operations continued at the site with the 148th Combat Communications Squadron until 1997, when Ontario ANGS was closed due to BRAC action and the 148th transferred to the renamed March ARB.

== Closure in 1995 ==
The Ontario Air National Guard Station closed as a result of the 1995 Base Realignment and Closure Commission.

The Ontario International Airport, a commercial facility which grew up around it, remains in active use in 2024.

== See also ==
- California World War II Army Airfields
- 36th Flying Training Wing (World War II)
