= List of military installations in South Carolina =

The State of South Carolina is home to military bases of four of the five military branches of the DoD. The United States Army and Marine Corps both have their basic training facilities in South Carolina. NWS Charleston, NWIC, and Charleston Air Force Base are grouped together into Joint Base Charleston.

== United States Air Force ==
Base
Charleston Air Force Base (Part of Joint Base Charleston)
Shaw Air Force Base
North Air Force Auxiliary Field

== United States Army ==
Base
Fort Jackson

== United States Marine Corps ==
Base
Marine Corps Air Station Beaufort
Marine Corps Recruit Depot Parris Island
Marine Corps Housing Base Laurel Bay

== United States Navy ==
Base
NWIC (Part of Joint Base Charleston)
Naval Weapons Station Charleston (Part of Joint Base Charleston)
