= 195th Wing =

195th Wing

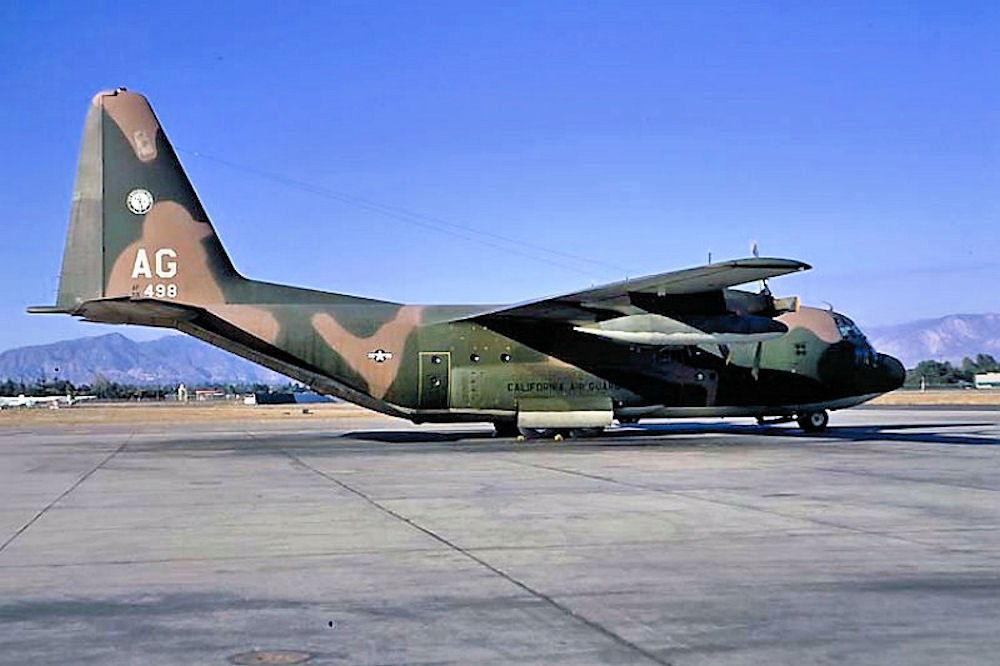
- Group C-130 Hercules (Note: Aircraft is Lockheed C-130A-7-LM Hercules serial 56-498)
- Active: 1962–1970; 1970–1974; 2015–present
- Country: United States
- Allegiance: California Air National Guard
- Branch: Air National Guard
- Role: Composite unit
- Part of: California Air National Guard
- Garrison/HQ: Beale Air Force Base
- Website: 195wg.ang.af.mil

Insignia
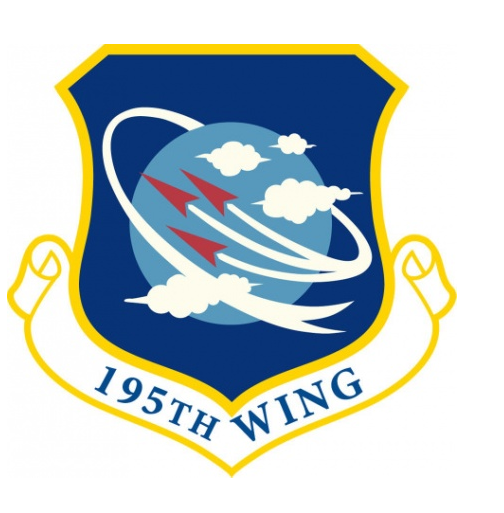
- 195th Wing emblem (approved 1 October 1973)

The 195th Wing is a unit of the California Air National Guard, stationed at Beale Air Force Base, California. If mobilized, the wing would be assigned to Air Combat Command. It comprises five subordinate units at four locations throughout the state. The 195th controls all non-flying, non-kinetic operations for the California Air National Guard. The wing was activated as the headquarters for California Air National Guard space, cyber, and intelligence, surveillance & reconnaissance units. Its space units were transferred out of the wing to the U.S. Space Force in 2025.

From 1970 through 1974, the wing flew Lockheed C-130 Hercules aircraft from Van Nuys Air National Guard Base as the 195th Tactical Airlift Group.

Today the wing's mission is to train, deploy and employ its airmen and assets to deliver integrated cyber, Communications, and intelligence, surveillance & reconnaissance capabilities to the Combatant Commands and the Governor of California.

== Organization ==
- 195th Intelligence, Surveillance and Reconnaissance Group, 1 September 2015 – present

149th Intelligence Squadron (Mather Field, California) (Note: If no location is given, the unit is located with wing headquarters at Beale Air Force Base.)
222d Intelligence Support Squadron
234th Intelligence Squadron

- 195th Operations Group, 1 September 2015 – present (Van Nuys, California)

147th Combat Communications Squadron
261st Cyber Operations Squadron (Van Nuys, California)

== History ==
=== Airlift group ===
The 195th Tactical Airlift Group was formed as the headquarters for the 195th Tactical Airlift Squadron in 1971 Van Nuys Air National Guard Base and was initially equipped with the Lockheed C-130A Hercules. In 1973, the group upgraded to the C-130B model of the Hercules. As the Vietnam War wound down, the demand for airlift decreased and the 146th Tactical Airlift Wing was reduced in size by inactivating the 195th Group and its components on 30 September 1974. The group's personnel, equipment and aircraft were reassigned to other units of the 146th Wing.

=== Composite wing ===
In August 2015, the California Air National Guard announced that it was forming a new wing to manage its military intelligence, space, cyber and combat communications missions. The core of the new wing would be the 162d Combat Communications Group, which would be inactivated when the wing stood up. Preparations for establishing the wing went back as far as 2001, when the 162d Group added units whose mission complemented its core combat communications mission.

== Lineage ==
- Constituted as the 195th Tactical Airlift Group and allotted to the Air National Guard on 30 December 1969

Activated on 15 May 1971
Federally recognized on 7 October 1971
Inactivated on 30 September 1974

- Redesignated 195th Wing and activated on 1 September 2015.

=== Assignments ===
- 146th Air Transport Wing (later 146th Military Airlift Wing), by 1962 – 14 April 1970
- 146th Tactical Airlift Wing, 15 May 1971 – 30 September 1974
- California Air National Guard, 1 September 2015 – present

=== Components ===
Groups

- 195th Intelligence, Surveillance and Reconnaissance Group, 1 September 2015 – present
- 195th Operations Group, 1 September 2015 – present

Squadrons

- 195th Air Transport Squadron (later 195th Military Airlift Squadron, 195th Tactical Airlift Squadron), by November 1962 – 14 April 1970, 15 May 1971 – 30 September 1974
- 195th Combat Support Squadron, 15 May 1971 – 30 September 1974
- 195th Supply Squadron, 15 May 1971 – 30 September 1974
- 148th Space Operations Squadron, 1 September 2015 - 1 October 2025
- 216th Space Control Squadron, 1 September 2015 - 1 October 2025

Flights

- 195th Aerial Port Flight, 15 May 1971 – 30 September 1974
- 195th Civil Engineering Flight, 15 May 1971 – 30 September 1974
- 195th Communications Flight, 15 May 1971 – 30 September 1974
- 195th Comptroller Flight, 1 September 2015 – present
- 195th Force Support Flight, 1 September 2015 – present

Medical

- 195th Tactical Dispensary (later 195th Tactical Clinic), 15 May 1971 – 30 September 1974

=== Stations ===
- Van Nuys Air National Guard Base, November 1962 – 14 April 1970
- Van Nuys Air National Guard Base, 15 May 1971 – 30 September 1974
- Beale Air Force Base, 1 September 2015 – present

=== Aircraft ===
- Lockheed C-130 Hercules, 1971-1974

== See also ==
- List of United States Air National Guard Groups & Wings
- List of C-130 Hercules operators
