= 234th Intelligence Squadron =

- Active: 1952-1966; 1966-present
- Country: United States
- Branch: Air National Guard
- Role: Intelligence
- Part of: 195th Wing
- Garrison/HQ: Beale Air Force Base, California
- Mottos: Nowhere to Hide (2004-Present); Nusquam Latendum Latin; We Communicate (before 2004); Clavis Dominus Latin

Insignia
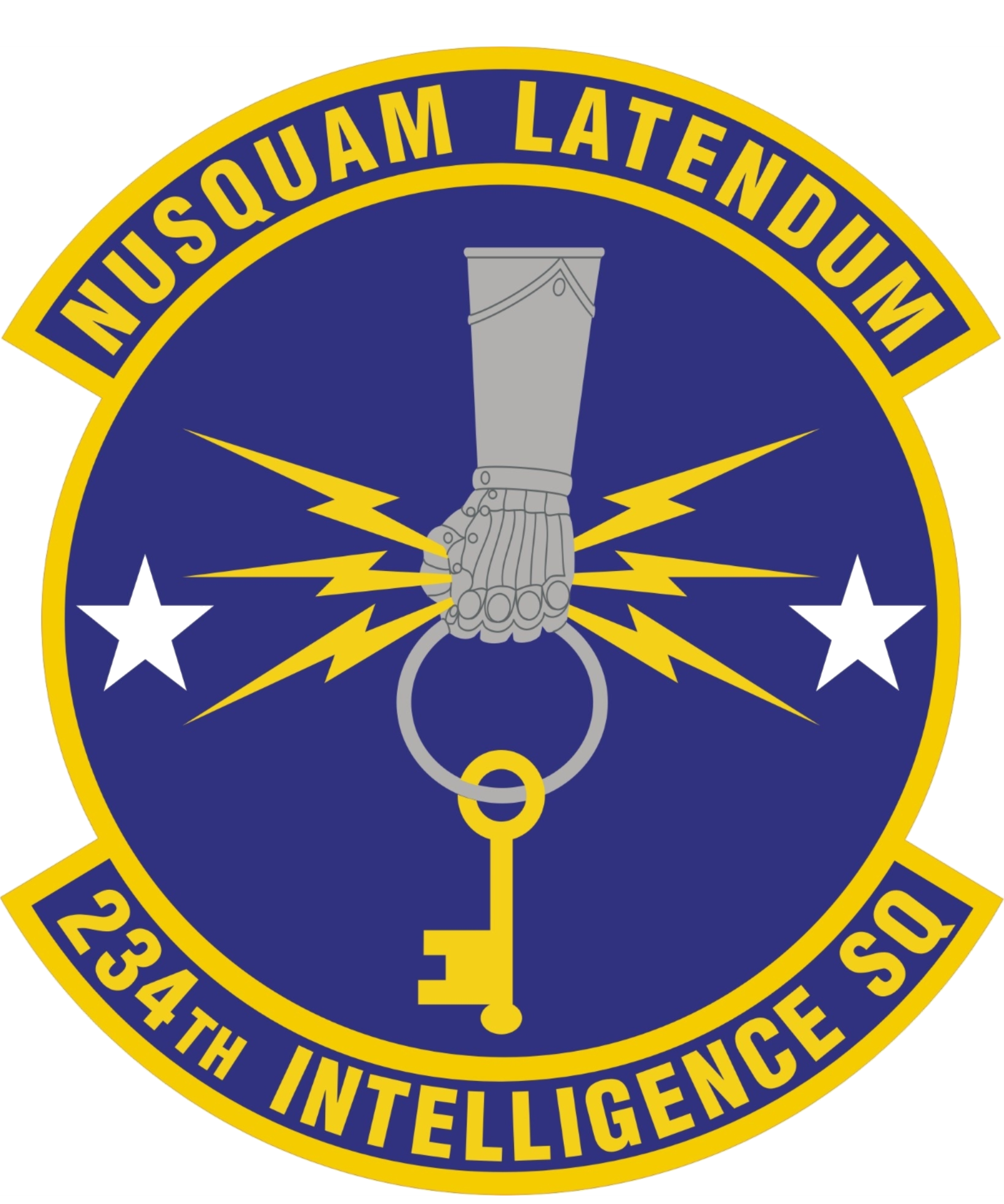
- 234th Intelligence Squadron emblem

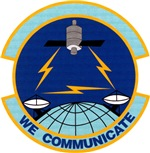
- 234th Combat Communications Squadron emblem

The United States Air Force's 234th Intelligence Squadron is an Air National Guard intelligence unit located at Beale Air Force Base, California.

== Lineage ==
234th Mobile Communications Flight

- Constituted as the 234th Airways and Air Communications Service Operations Flight and allotted to the Air National Guard

Activated on 20 November 1952
Redesignated 234th Airways and Air Communications Service Flight, Mobile c. 11 January 1953
Redesignated 234th Mobile Communications Flight (Heavy) on 1 July 1961
Inactivated c. 20 January 1966

234th Intelligence Squadron

- Constituted as the 234th Mobile Communications Squadron on 1 January 1966 and allotted to the Air National Guard

Activated c. 6 September 1966
Redesignated 234th Mobile Communications Squadron (Bare Base) on 16 March 1968
Redesignated 234th Mobile Communications Squadron (Tactical Air Base) unknown
Redesignated 234th Combat Communications Squadron (Tactical Air Base) on 1 April 1976
Redesignated 234th Combat Information Systems Squadron on 1 July 1985
Redesignated 234th Combat Communications Squadron on 1 October 1986
Redesignated 234th Intelligence Squadron on 1 December 2004

=== Assignments ===
- 144th Maintenance and Supply Group, 20 November 1952
- 144th Fighter-Bomber Wing, c. 11 January 1953
- 162d Communications Group (later 162d Mobile Communications Group, 162d Combat Communications Group, 162d Combat Informations Systems Group, 162d Combat Communications Group) (attached to 548th Intelligence Group after 1 December 2004), 1 July 1961 – c. 20 January 1966, c. 6 September 1966
- 195th Wing, 1 September 2015 – present

=== Stations ===
- Hayward Municipal Airport, California, 20 November 1952 – c. 20 January 1966
- Hayward Municipal Airport (later Hayward Air National Guard Station), California, c. 6 September 1966
- Beale Air Force Base, California, c. 1 December 2004 – present
