= North Auxiliary Airfield =

- Part of Joint Base Charleston
- Near North, South Carolina in the United States of America
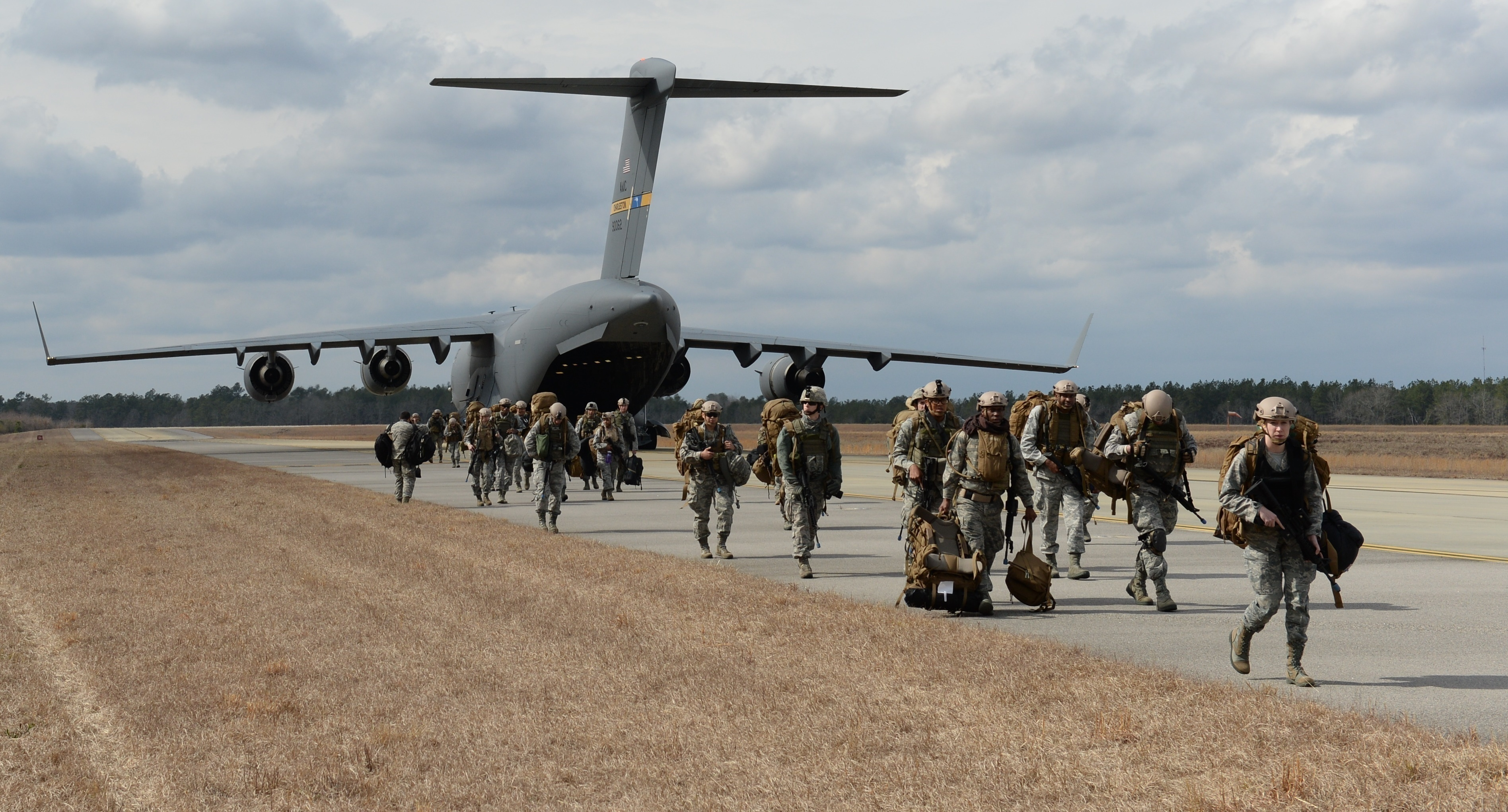
- US Air Force personnel participating in Exercise Scorpion Lens 15 disembark a C-17 Globemaster III at North Auxiliary Airfield during 2015.

Site information
- Type: US Air Force airfield
- Owner: Department of Defense
- Operator: US Air Force
- Controlled by: Air Mobility Command
- Condition: Operational

Location
- Location in the United States
- Coordinates: 33°37′01″N 081°04′59″W
- Area: 970 hectares (2,400 acres)

Site history
- Built: 1942–1945
- In use: 1942 – present

Garrison information
- Garrison: 628th Civil Engineer Squadron

Airfield information
- Identifiers: ICAO: KXNO, FAA LID: XNO
- Elevation: 321 feet (98 m) AMSL
Runways
Direction	Length and surface
06/24	3,048.9 metres (10,003 ft) asphalt
051/231	1,066.8 metres (3,500 ft) concrete

North Air Force Auxiliary Airfield (ICAO: KXNO, FAA LID: XNO) is a military airfield located 3 miles (4.8 km) east of North, a town in Orangeburg County, South Carolina, United States.

It is owned by the U.S. Air Force and is used primarily for C-17 Globemaster III training by the 437th Airlift Wing (437 AW) and its Air Force Reserve "Associate" unit, the 315th Airlift Wing (315 AW), at Joint Base Charleston. Other units can utilize North with prior coordination with the 628th Air Base Wing (628 ABW). The 628th Civil Engineering Squadron (628 CES) of the 628 ABW at Charleston AFB maintains a detachment to maintain and operate the airfield.

== Facilities ==
North Auxiliary Airfield covers an area of 2,400 acres (971 ha), of which 1,150 acres (465 ha) are undeveloped. It contains two asphalt paved runways: the main runway (6/24) measuring 10,000 x 150 ft (3,048 x 46 m) and an asphalt runway (5/23) measuring 3,500 x 90 ft (1,067 x 27 m).

== History ==
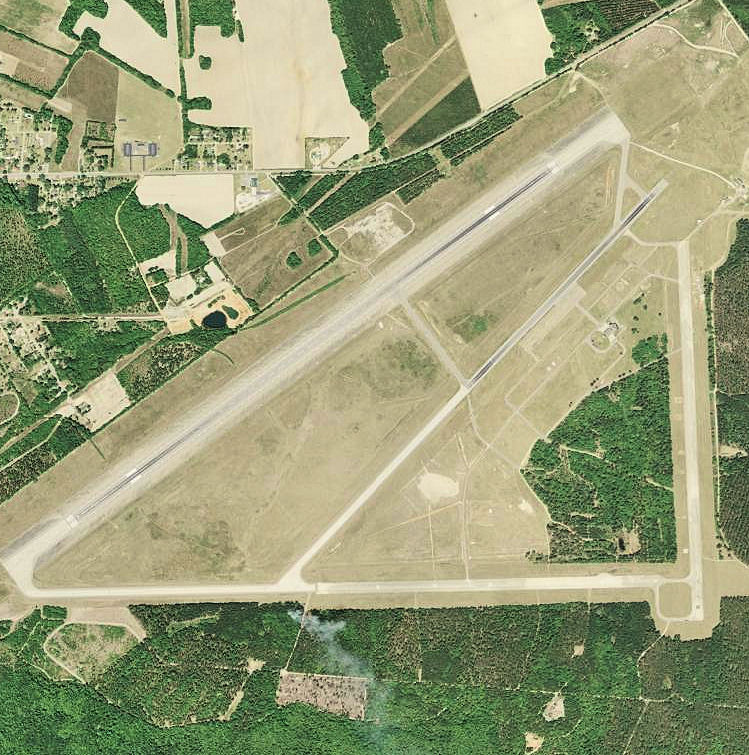
Aerial view of North Auxiliary Airfield during 2006

The land for North Army Airfield was bought between 1942 and 1945. The airfield was built by the United States Army Air Forces The original dirt runway was constructed in April 1943 and used by Hughes Aircraft Company for testing, as well as being a satellite airfield of Columbia Army Air Base, supporting B-25 Mitchell medium bomber training for Third Air Force's III Air Support Command. Training was accomplished by 74th Station Complement Squadron which also maintained the facility.

After World War II, a 10,000 ft runway and a 3,000 ft assault runway were built. North Airfield (later North Auxiliary Airfield, Northfield Air Base), has been under the jurisdiction of Fort Jackson, the former 363rd Tactical Reconnaissance Wing at Shaw AFB, and the United States Department of Energy (DOE). On 1 October 1979, the 437th Airlift Wing at Charleston AFB assumed real property jurisdiction, control, and accountability over North Field.

With the transition of the 437th Airlift Wing and 512th Airlift Wing (Associate) to the C-17 Globemaster III, an air traffic control tower and permanent aircraft rescue and firefighting (ARFF) station was constructed at North Auxiliary Airfield. However, this control tower is only staffed for air traffic control for specific military flight operations and is not normally staffed, with the airfield continuing to be designated as an uncontrolled airport.

== See also ==
- List of United States Air Force installations
- List of military installations in South Carolina
- South Carolina World War II Army Airfields
