= 261st Cyberspace Operations Squadron =

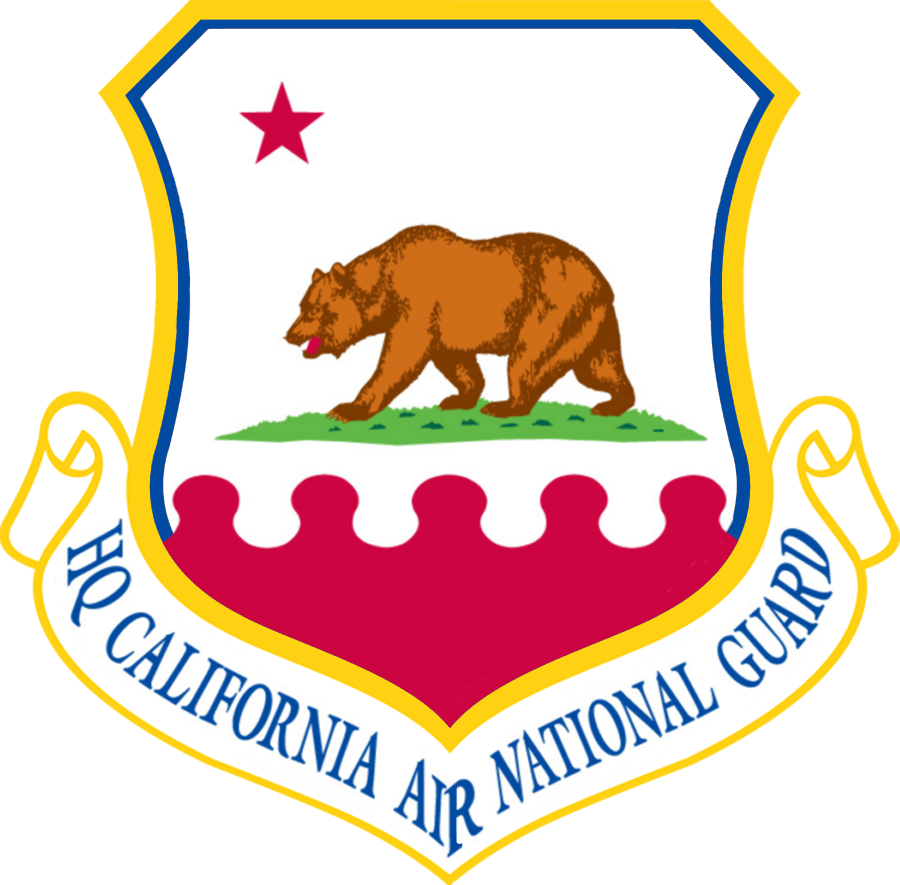
261st Cyberspace Operations Squadron

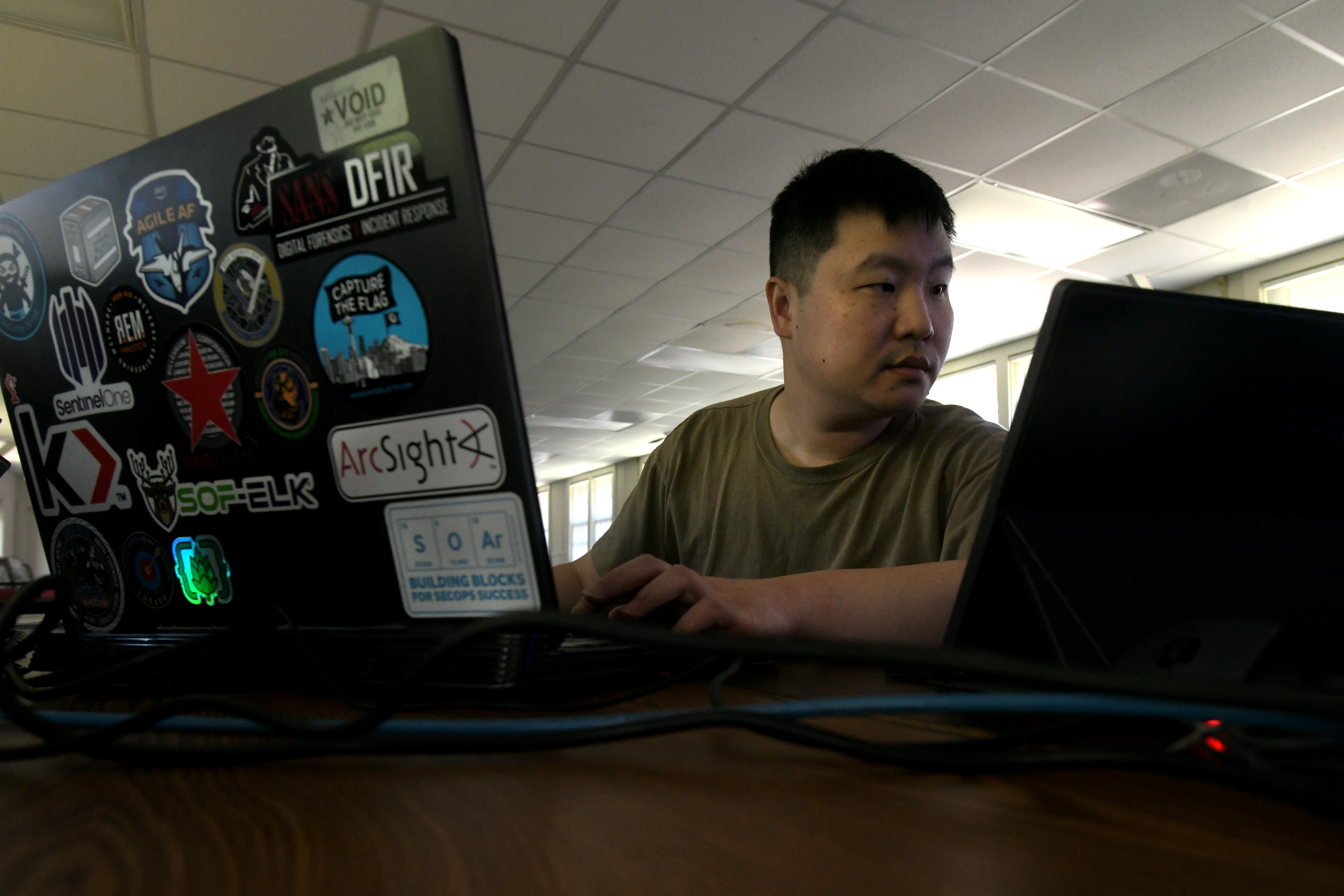
- A squadron cyber warfare operator monitors network code for suspicious activity during Exercise Cyber Shield
- Active: 1943–1946; 1948–present
- Country: United States
- Allegiance: California Air National Guard
- Branch: United States Air Force
- Role: Cyberspace operations
- Part of: 195th Wing
- Garrison/HQ: Sepulveda Air National Guard Station
- Mottos: No Limit on Communications; Cyber Secured, Mission Assured
- Engagements: Southwest Pacific Theater

Insignia
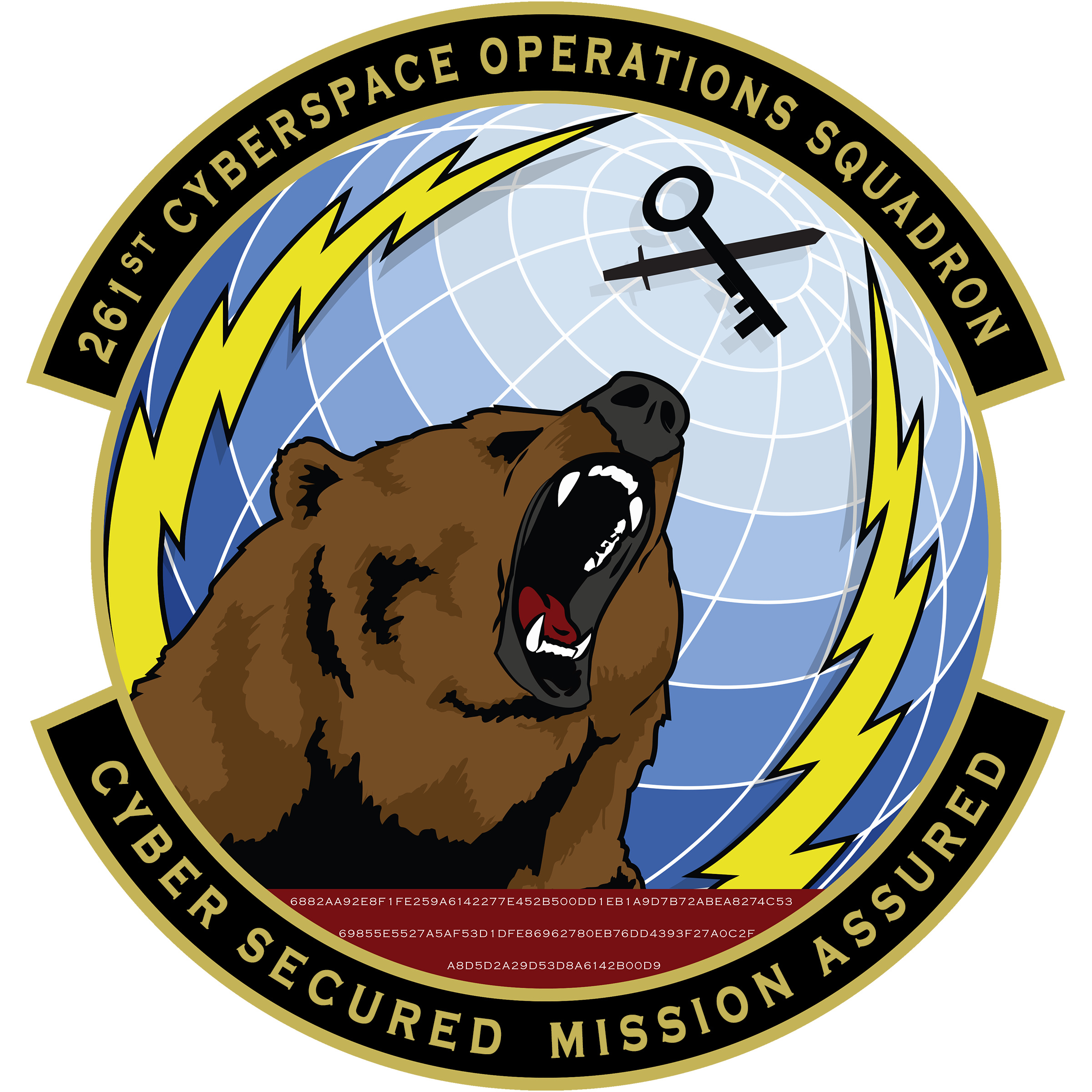
- 261st Combat Communications Squadron emblem

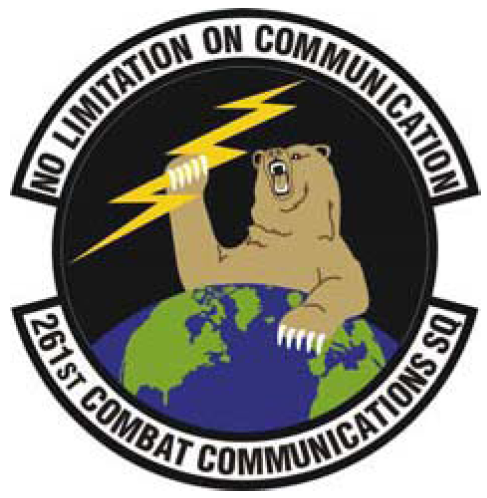
- 261st Combat Communication Squadron emblem

The United States Air Force's 261st Cyberspace Operations Squadron is a California Air National Guard combat communications unit located at Sepulveda Air National Guard Station, California. It is assigned to the 195th Wing.

== Mission ==
The mission of the 261st Cyberspace Operations Squadron is to provide "cyber mission assurance and threat mitigation support to the United States Critical Infrastructure Key Resources, while support domestic operations for the State of California."

== History ==
The 261st Combat Communications Squadron traces its beginnings to the 96th Signal Company, Service Group. Activated at Reno Army Air Base, Nevada on 1 January 1943. The unit moved shortly thereafter to Muroc Army Air Field, California. Redesignated as the 1096th Signal Company, the unit moved to Great Falls Montana prior to being equipped on 17 October 1943. The unit received battle credits during World War II for the New Guinea Campaign, the Southern Philippines Campaign and the Luzon Campaign. Additionally, the unit served in Machinato, Okinawa and Tachikawa Airfield, Japan, where it was inactivated on 25 March 1946.

The unit was redesignated the 611th Signal Light Construction Company and allotted to the National Guard in May 1946. It was organized on 15 August 1948 at the National Guard Center, Alameda California and received federal recognition on 27 September 1948. At the time of recognition, the unit had two officers and ten enlisted members assigned.

On 1 July 1952, the company was redesignated the 261st Communications Squadron, (Operations) and on 26 January 1953, became part of the California Air National Guard with its move to Hayward Air National Guard Base, California.

On 1 July 1953, the squadron was reassigned to the 146th Fighter-Bomber Wing at Van Nuys Air National Guard Base, California where it remained until its final move to Sepulveda Air National Guard Station on 1 August 1973.

During the 34 years that the unit has been located at Sepulveda Air National Guard Station, members have participated in numerous Joint Forces Exercises and Operations. Personnel assigned to the 261st have served in Korea, Thailand, Japan and Hawaii as well as in Europe, Bosnia, and Southeast and Southwest Asia.

== Lineage ==
- Constituted as the 96th Signal Company, Service Group on 28 December 1942

Activated on 1 January 1943
Redesignated 1096th Signal Company, Service Group on 27 October 1943
Inactivated on 25 March 1946

- Redesignated 111th Signal Light Construction Company and allotted to the National Guard on 24 May 1946
- Designation revoked and changed to 611th Signal Light Construction Company

Activated on 15 August 1948
Federal recognition extended on 27 September 1948
Redesignated 261st Communications Squadron, Operations on 1 July 1952
Redesignated 261st Radio Relay Squadron on 23 September 1960
Redesignated 261st Mobile Communications Squadron on 15 March 1968
Redesignated 261st Combat Communications Squadron on 24 March 1976
Redesignated 261st Combat Information Systems Squadron on 15 October 1984
Redesignated 261st Combat Communications Squadron on 1 October 1986
Redesignated 261st Information Systems Squadron unknown
Redesignated 261st Network Operations Squadron c. 2014
Redesignated 261st Cyber Operations Squadron on 1 September 2015

=== Assignments ===
- Unknown, 1 January 1943 – 25 March 1946
- 61st Fighter Wing, 15 August 1948
- 161st Aircraft Control and Warning Group, 1 October 1950
- 252d Communications Group, 1 July 1952
- 162d Communications Group (later 162d Mobile Communications Group, 162d Combat Communications Group, 162d Combat Information Systems Group, 162d Combat Communications Group), unknown
- 195th Operations Group, 1 September 2015 – present

=== Stations ===
- Reno Army Air Base, Nevada, 1 January 1943
- Muroc Army Air Base, California, 1943
- Great Falls Army Air Base, Montana, 1943
- Nadzab, New Guinea, 1943
- Leyte, Philippines, 1944
- Clark Air Base, Luzon, Philippines, 1945
- Ie Shima, Ryuk Islands, 1945
- Machinato, Okinawa, 1945
- Tachikawa Airfield, Japan, unknown – 25 March 1946
- Camp Kohler, California, 15 May 1948
- Alameda Air National Guard Base, California, 1951
- Hayward, California, January 1953
- Van Nuys Air National Guard Base, California, July 1953
- Sepulveda Air National Guard Station, California, 1 August 1973
