= 147th Combat Communications Squadron =

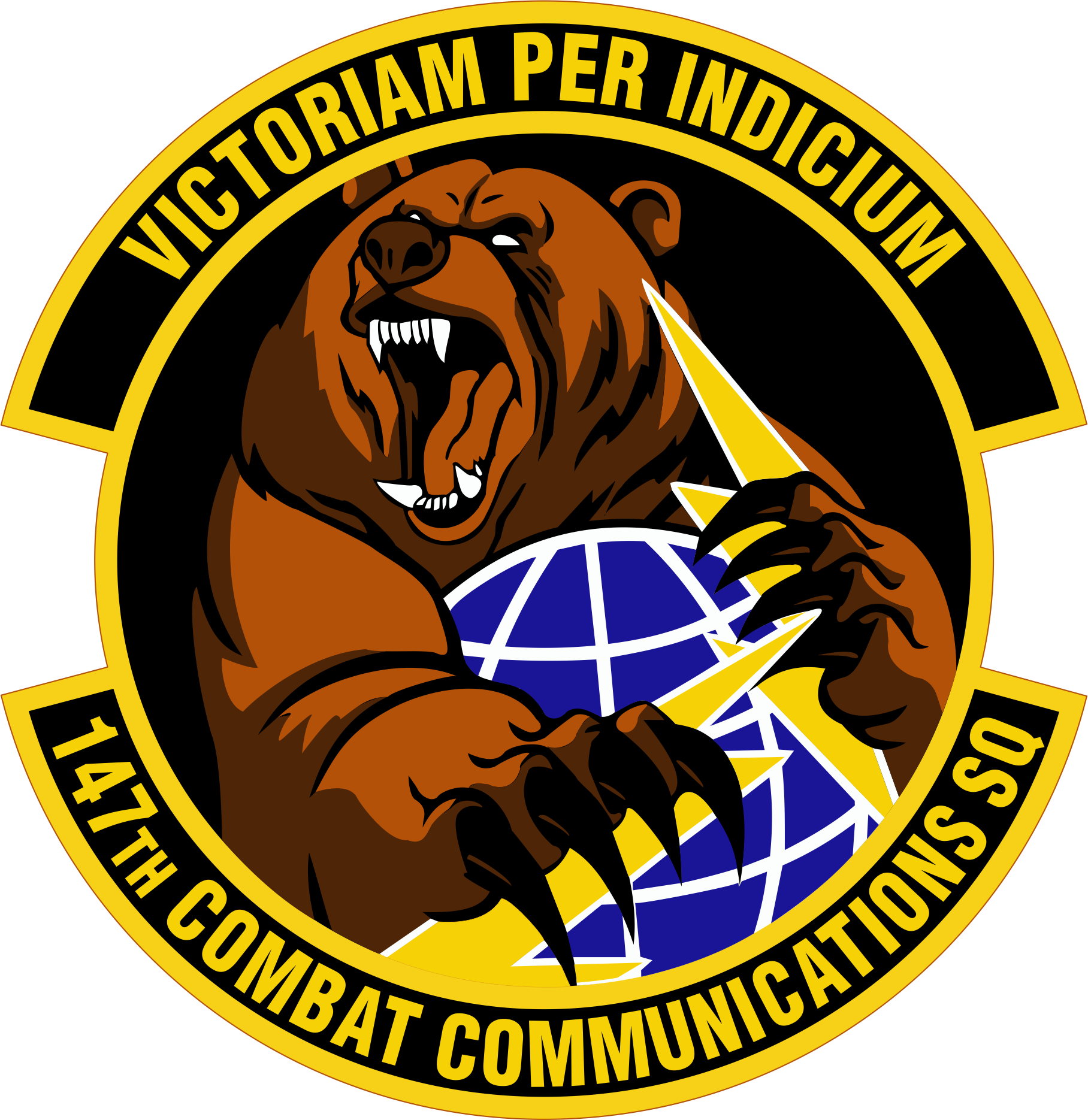
- Active: 1946 – present
- Country: United States
- Branch: United States Air Force
- Type: Combat Communications
- Role: Combat Support
- Part of: Air National Guard/195th Wing
- Garrison/HQ: San Diego, California
- Motto: "Victoriam Per Indicium"
- Mascot: Grizzly Bear

Commanders
- Current commander: Maj. Steven Cruz

The United States Air Force's 147th Combat Communications Squadron (147 CBCS) is an Air National Guard combat communications unit in San Diego, California.

== Mission ==
To provide rapidly-deployable communications support for global combat operations and disaster response, utilizing highly skilled Airmen and leading-edge communications technology.

== History ==
The 147th Combat Communications Squadron was constituted as the 147th Aircraft Control Squadron (147 ACS) on May 27, 1946. Prior to its constitution, the unit was allocated to the National Guard Bureau and was later assigned to the state of California on May 24, 1946. The 147 ACS was organized as a unit on June 20, 1948, at the Lockheed Air Terminal, in Burbank, California. The Secretary of the Army bestowed Federal recognition on the unit on July 18, 1948. The unit later moved to its new home in San Fernando Valley Airport, California on January 26, 1951.

== Assignments ==
=== Major Command/Gaining Command ===
- Air National Guard/Air Combat Command (1 June 1992 – present)
- Air National Guard/Tactical Air Command (???- ???)
- Air National Guard/Air Force Communications Command (???- ???)
- Air National Guard/Air Defense Command (???- ???)

=== Wing/Group ===
- 195th Wing

== Previous designations ==
- 147th Combat Communications Squadron (1 October 1986 – present)
- 147th Combat Information Systems Squadron (July 1985-1 October 1986)
- 147th Combat Communications Squadron (1976–1985)
- 147th Mobile Communications Squadron (1968–1976)
- 147th Communications Squadron (Tributary Team) (1960–1968)
- 147th Aircraft Warning and Control Squadron (1946–1960)

== Bases stationed ==
- San Diego, California (1988 – present)
- Van Nuys, California (1953–1988)
- Duncanville, Texas (1 May 1951 – 1 February 1953)
- San Fernando Valley Airport, California (26 January 1951 – 1 May 1951)
- Burbank, California (20 June 1948 – 26 January 1951)

== Commanders ==
- Maj Steven Cruz (2023–Present)
- Lt Col Tracy Lloyd (2020–2023)
- Lt Col Todd A. Curtright (2015–2020)
- Lt Col Jeremy J Peralta
- Lt Col Whitman (???-???)
- Lt Col Victor Adame (2013–???)
- Lt Col Douglas Hire (2002–2013)
- Lt Col Virgil Iler (1994–2002)
- Lt Col George Bowen (1989–??)
- Lt Col Vernon H. Parsons (1983–1989)

== Decorations ==
- Air Force Outstanding Unit Award

== See also ==
- 162d Combat Communications Group
