= 148th Space Operations Squadron =

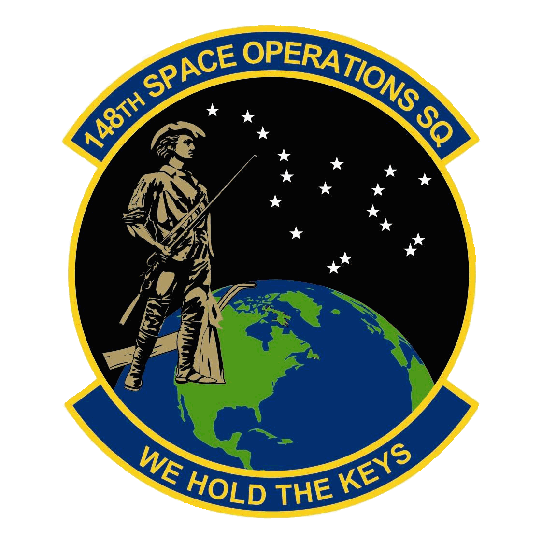
- 148th Space Operations Squadron emblem
- Active: 1948–1953; 1953–present
- Country: United States
- Branch: United States
- Role: Satellite operations
- Part of: California Air National Guard
- Garrison/HQ: Vandenberg Space Force Base
- Motto: We Hold the Keys
- Decorations: Air Force Outstanding Unit Award

Commanders
- Current commander: Lt Col Nathan Foss

The United States Air Force's 148th Space Operations Squadron is a satellite control unit located at Vandenberg Space Force Base, California. The squadron is tasked with back-up command and control of the MILSTAR satellite constellation.

== Mission ==
The 148th mans the Primary Satellite Operations Center-Vandenberg Space Force Base (PSOC-V), one of two fixed Milstar Ground Stations. Unique to Milstar is its ground segment for control of the constellation. Milstar has two fixed ground stations, Primary Satellite Operations Center (PSOC), at 4 SOPS and Primary Satellite Operations Center – Vandenberg or PSOC-V. Each site is fully capable of complete constellation control and operates 24/7. The Milstar Ops Center-Vandenberg is operated by the 148 SOPS, a California Air Guard Unit, and does control 2 Milstar satellites full-time.

== History ==
The 148 SOPS was originally established as the 148th Aircraft Control and Warning Squadron at Compton, California. The unit was redesignated the 148th Space Operations Squadron and relocated to Vandenberg AFB, California on 31 October 2000.

== Lineage ==
- Constituted as the 148th Aircraft Control and Warning Squadron on 24 May 1946 and allotted to the National Guard

Activated c. 14 June 1948
Called to active duty on 1 May 1951
Inactivated, returned to stated control and redesignated 148th Aircraft Control and Warning Flight on 1 February 1953
Redesignated 148th Communications Squadron (Tributary Team) on 1 October 1960
Redesignated 148th Communications Squadron (Relay Center) on 1 September 1964
Redesignated 148th Mobile Communications Squadron (Contingency) on 16 March 1968
Redesignated 148th Combat Communications Squadron (Contingency) on 1 April 1976
Redesignated 148th Combat Information Systems Squadron (Contingency) on 1 July 1985
Redesignated 148th Combat Communications Squadron (Contingency) on 1 October 1986
Redesignated 148th Space Operations Squadron on 31 October 2000

=== Assignments ===
- 162d Aircraft Control and Warning Group, c. 14 June 1948
- Fourth Air Force, 1 May 1951
- 159th Aircraft Control and Warning Group, 12 May 1951
- 33rd Air Division, 6 February 1952
- 162nd Tactical Control Group (later 162nd Communications Group, 162nd Mobile Communications Group, 162nd Combat Communications Group, 162nd Combat Information Systems Group, 162nd Combat Communications Group), 1 February 1953 (attached to 30th Space Wing after 31 October 2000)
- 195th Operations Group, 1 September 2015 – present (attached to 30th Space Wing [later Space Launch Delta 30])

=== Stations ===
- Compton Airport, California, c. 14 June 1948
- Tuttle, Oklahoma, 12 May 1951
- Tinker Air Force Base, Oklahoma, 15 August 1951 (Note: Shortly after the squadron moved to Tinker, Air Defense Command facilities at Tinker were designated as a separate installation, Oklahoma City Air Force Station. The station was merged back into Tinker in 1993.)
- Compton Air National Guard Station, California, 1 February 1953
- North Highlands Air National Guard Station, California, 1 October 1960
- Ontario International Airport (later Ontario Air National Guard Station), California, 1984
- March Air Reserve Base, California, 1997
- Vandenberg Air Force Base (later Vandenberg Space Force Base), 31 October 2000 – present

== See also ==
- 4th Space Operations Squadron – Active duty counterpart to 148th
- MILSTAR – Military Strategic and Tactical Relay satellite
