= 162nd Combat Communications Group =

Inactive unit of the US California Air National Guard

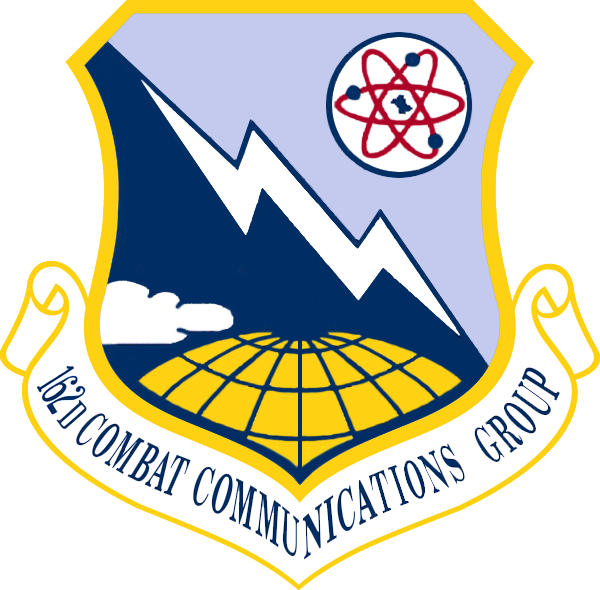
- 162nd Combat Communications Group emblem
- Active: 1944–1946; 1948–2015
- Country: United States
- Branch: Air National Guard
- Role: Combat communications

The 162nd Combat Communications Group (officially 162d Combat Communications Group) is an inactive unit, formerly of the California Air National Guard. It was headquartered at North Highlands Air National Guard Station near Sacramento, California.

== Mission ==
Under its federal mission, the 162nd trained, deployed, operated and maintained tactical communications-electronic facilities, and provided tactical command and control communications services for operational commands supporting Military of the United States wartime contingencies. – Under its federal mission, the group trained, deployed, operated and maintained tactical communications-electronic facilities, and provided tactical command and control communications services for operational commands supporting US military wartime contingencies.

== History ==
The 162nd's history goes back to the 599th Signal Aircraft Warning Battalion activated at Drew Field, Florida on 30 March 1944. Shortly thereafter, the unit moved to Oahu, Hawaii. Some of its components saw action in the Marshall and Mariana Islands during World War II. The unit was inactivated on 29 July 1946, but was activated in the National Guard on 13 May 1948 as the 162nd Aircraft Control and Warning Group.

On 1 May 1951 the unit mobilized to serve state side during the Korean War until its inactivation on 6 February 1952. The following year, it returned to the State of California and was redesignated the 162nd Tactical Control Group, stationed at Van Nuys Air National Guard Base. At that time three of the presently assigned units (the 147th, 148th, and 149th) were Aircraft Control and Warning Squadrons under the 162nd Group.

On 1 March 1961, the group headquarters moved to North Highlands Air National Guard Station near Sacramento, and was redesignated the 162nd Communications Group (Mobile). By that time the 222nd, 234th, and 261st squadrons had joined the group. In 1966 the group was redesignated again, as the 162nd Mobile Communications Group. This designation they kept until 10 February 1976, when it was given its present designation of 162nd Combat Communications Group.

The group was inactivated on 1 September 2015 and its assets were transferred to the 195th Wing, stationed at Beale Air Force Base, California.

== Lineage ==
- Constituted as the 599th Signal Aircraft Warning Battalion

Activated on 30 March 1944
Inactivated on 29 July 1946

- Redesignated 162nd Aircraft Control and Warning Group and allotted to the National Guard in August 1946

Activated on 13 May 1948 and federally recognized
Called to active duty on 1 May 1951
Inactivated on 6 February 1952

- Redesignated 162nd Tactical Control Group and returned to the control of the Air National Guard

Activated on 1 Feb 1953
Redesignated 162nd Communications Group (Mobile) on 1 March 1961
Redesignated 162nd Mobile Communications Group on 16 March 1968
Redesignated 162nd Combat Communications Group on 1 April 1976
Redesignated 162nd Combat Information Systems Group on 1 July 1985
Redesignated 162nd Combat Communications Group on 1 October 1986
Inactivated on 1 September 2015

=== Assignments ===
- Signal Aircraft Warning Training Center, 30 March 1944
- VII Fighter Command c. September 1944
- Signal Aircraft Warning Service, VII Fighter Command, c. September 1944 – 29 July 1946
- 62nd Fighter Wing, 13 May 1948
- California Air National Guard, c. 30 October 1950
- Fourth Air Force, 1 May 1951
- Western Air Defense Force, c. 10 May 1951
- 25th Air Division, 1 June 1951 – 6 February 1952
- California Air National Guard, 1 January 1953 – 1 September 2015

=== Components ===
- 147th Combat Communications Squadron in San Diego, California
- 148th Space Operations Squadron at Vandenberg Air Force Base, California
- 149th Combat Communications Squadron at North Highlands ANGS, California
- 216th Operations Support Squadron at Vandenberg Air Force Base, California
- 222nd Combat Communications Squadron in Costa Mesa, California
- 234th Intelligence Squadron at Beale AFB, California
- 261st Combat Communications Squadron in Van Nuys, California

=== Stations ===
- Drew Field, Florida, 30 March 1944
- Oahu, Hawaii, c. September 1944
- Saipan, Mariana Islands, 22 September 1944 – 29 July 1946
- Van Nuys Municipal Airport, 13 May 1948
- Larson Air Force Base, Washington, c. 10 May 1951 – 6 February 1952
- Van Nuys Air National Guard Base, 1 January 1953
- North Highlands Air National Guard Station, 1 March 1961 – 1 September 2015
