= 149th Combat Communications Squadron =

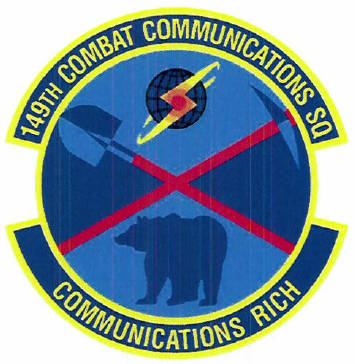
- 149th Combat Communications Squadron emblem
- Active: 1946 – present
- Country: United States
- Branch: United States Air Force
- Type: Combat Communications
- Role: Combat Support
- Part of: Air National Guard/162d Combat Communications Group
- Garrison/HQ: North Highlands ANGS, California
- Decorations: Global War on Terrorism-Service medal Kosovo Service Medal

The United States Air Force's 149th Combat Communications Squadron (149th CBCS) is an Air National Guard combat communications unit located at North Highlands Air National Guard Station, California.

== History ==
The 149th CBCS deployed five IC4Us to support Hurricane Katrina's recovery effort. The task force was based at Belle Chasse Naval Air Station, Louisiana supporting Task Force Pelican—which includes three sub-task forces delivering a balanced mix of engineer, aviation, logistical, communication, security, and evacuation support to New Orleans' disaster stricken residents.

== Assignments ==
=== Major Command/Gaining Command ===
- Air National Guard/Air Combat Command (1992–present)
- Air National Guard/Tactical Air Command (???–1992)
- Air National Guard/Air Defense Command (???–1992)

=== Wing/Group ===
- 162d Combat Communications Group (195?–Present)
- 162d Tactical Control Group (???)

== Previous designations ==
- 149th Combat Communications Squadron (???–Present)
- 149th Aircraft Control and Warning Flight (1 February 1953–???)
- 149th Aircraft Control and Warning Squadron (24 May 1946 – 1 February 1953)

== Bases stationed ==
- North Highlands ANGS, California (???–present)
- Del Paso ANGB, Texas (???–???)
- Ellington AFB, Texas (15 May 1951 – 1 February 1953)

== See also ==
- 162d Combat Communications Group – parent unit to the 149th CBCS
