= Waldo Junction, California =

Unincorporated community in California, United States

Waldo Junction
- Unincorporated community
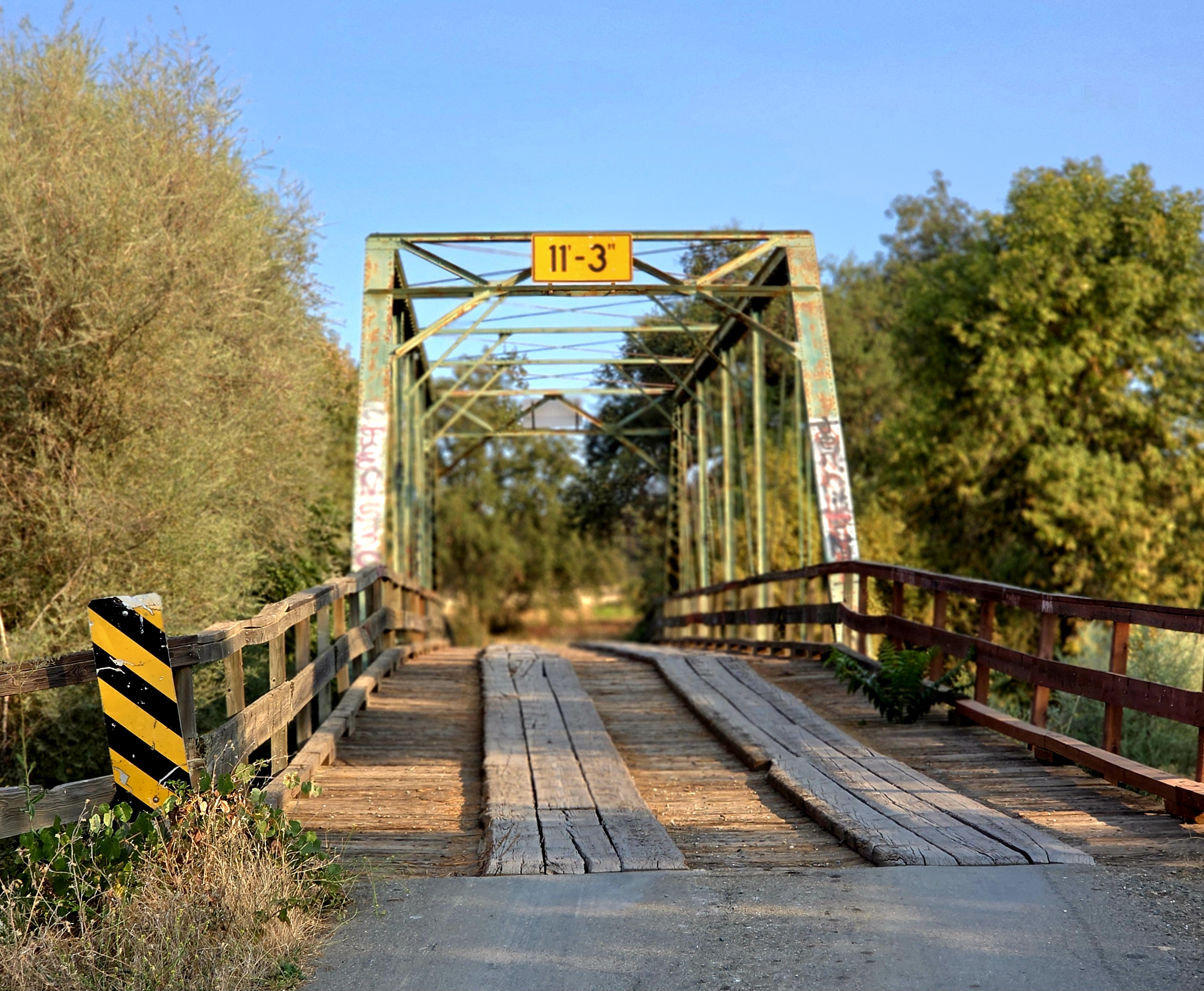
- Waldo Junction Bridge

- Location in California Waldo Junction (the United States)
- Coordinates: 39°06′40″N 121°18′33″W
- Country: United States
- State: California
- County: Yuba
- Elevation: 256 ft (78 m)

Waldo Junction (formerly Waldo and Cabbage Patch) is an unincorporated community in Yuba County, California, United States. It is located on Dry Creek, 9.5 miles (15.3 km) northeast of Wheatland, at an elevation of 256 feet (78 m).

A post office operated here from 1898 to 1915. Originally called Cabbage Patch in 1852, the name changed to Waldo upon the opening of the post office. The name honors William Waldo, an early settler. Other sources, however, state the name honors Waldo Johnson, a prominent attorney of Marysville.

According to the Nevada County Historical Landmarks Commission, the early name “Cabbage Patch” arose because Black farmers in the area raised cabbage to supply nearby miners with vitamin C.
