= List of displayed General Dynamics F-16 Fighting Falcons =

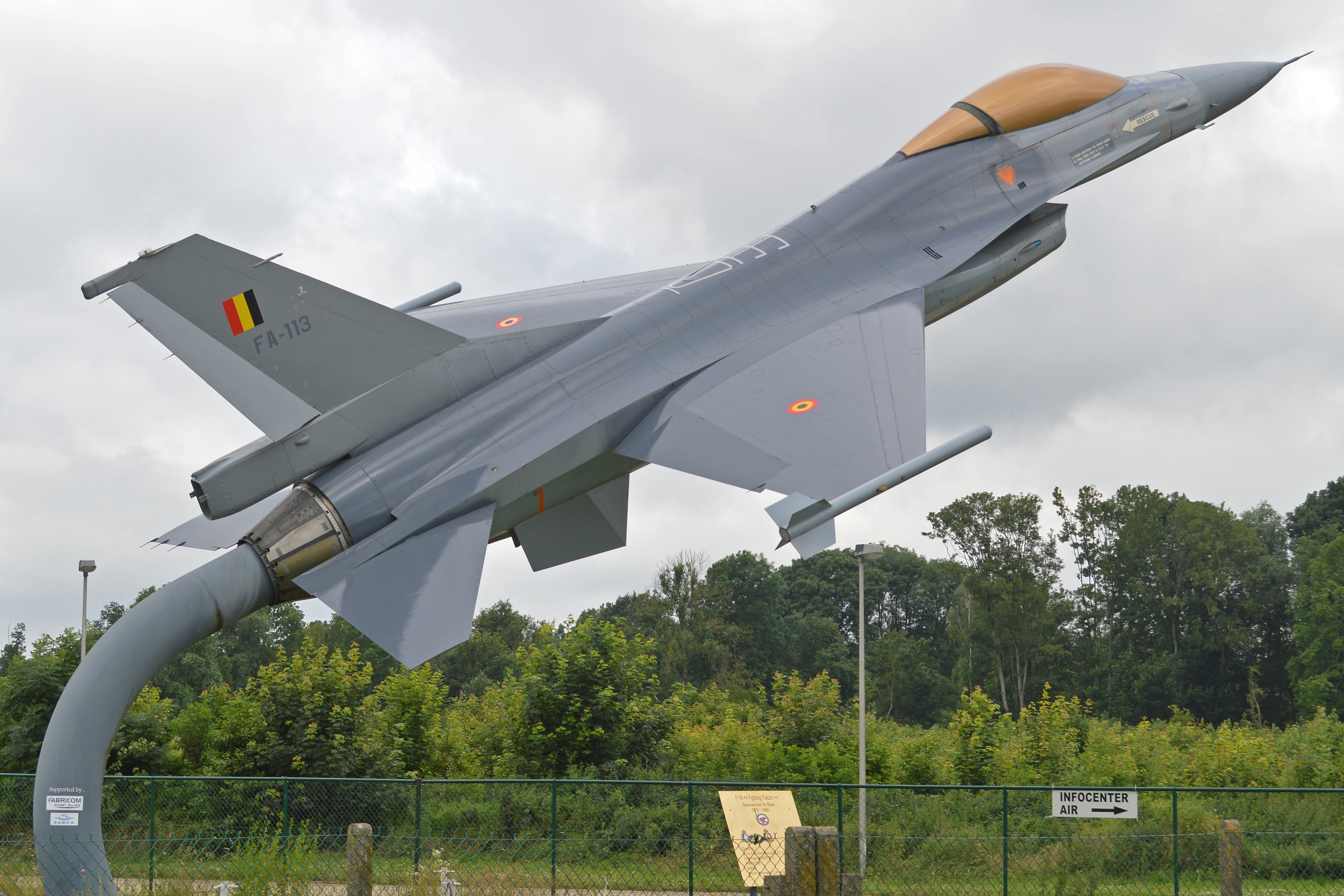
Belgian Air Component F-16A FA-113, at Beauvechain Air Base, Belgium

The General Dynamics F-16 Fighting Falcon is an American supersonic multirole fighter aircraft originally developed for the United States Air Force. It has since been adopted by numerous air forces worldwide, and has been in near-continuous production since 1974, totaling approximately 4,600 aircraft. As newer variants have entered service, large numbers of older models have been placed on display around the world following their retirement.

== Aircraft on display ==
=== Belgium ===
F-16A

- FA-01 – On display at the Royal Museum of the Armed Forces and Military History in Brussels, Belgium
- FA-04 – On display at the Musée Spitfire, Florennes Air Base.
- FA-44 – On static display at Florennes Air Base.
- FA-47 – Pylon display at Florennes Air Base.
- FA-113 – Pylon display at Beauvechain Air Base.

=== Denmark ===
F-16AM

- E-174 – On display at the Danmarks Flymuseum, Stauning. Displayed as configured upon delivery in 1980.
- E-177 – Pylon display at Skrydstrup Air Base, Vojens, Jutland.

=== France ===
F-16A

- FA-55 – On display at the Chateau de Savigny les Beaune in Beaune, France. Ex-Belgian Air Force.

=== Germany ===
F-16A

- 78-0057 – Pylon display at Spangdahlem Air Base.
- J-245 – Pylon display at Ramstein Air Base. Ex-Royal Netherlands Air Force.

=== Israel ===
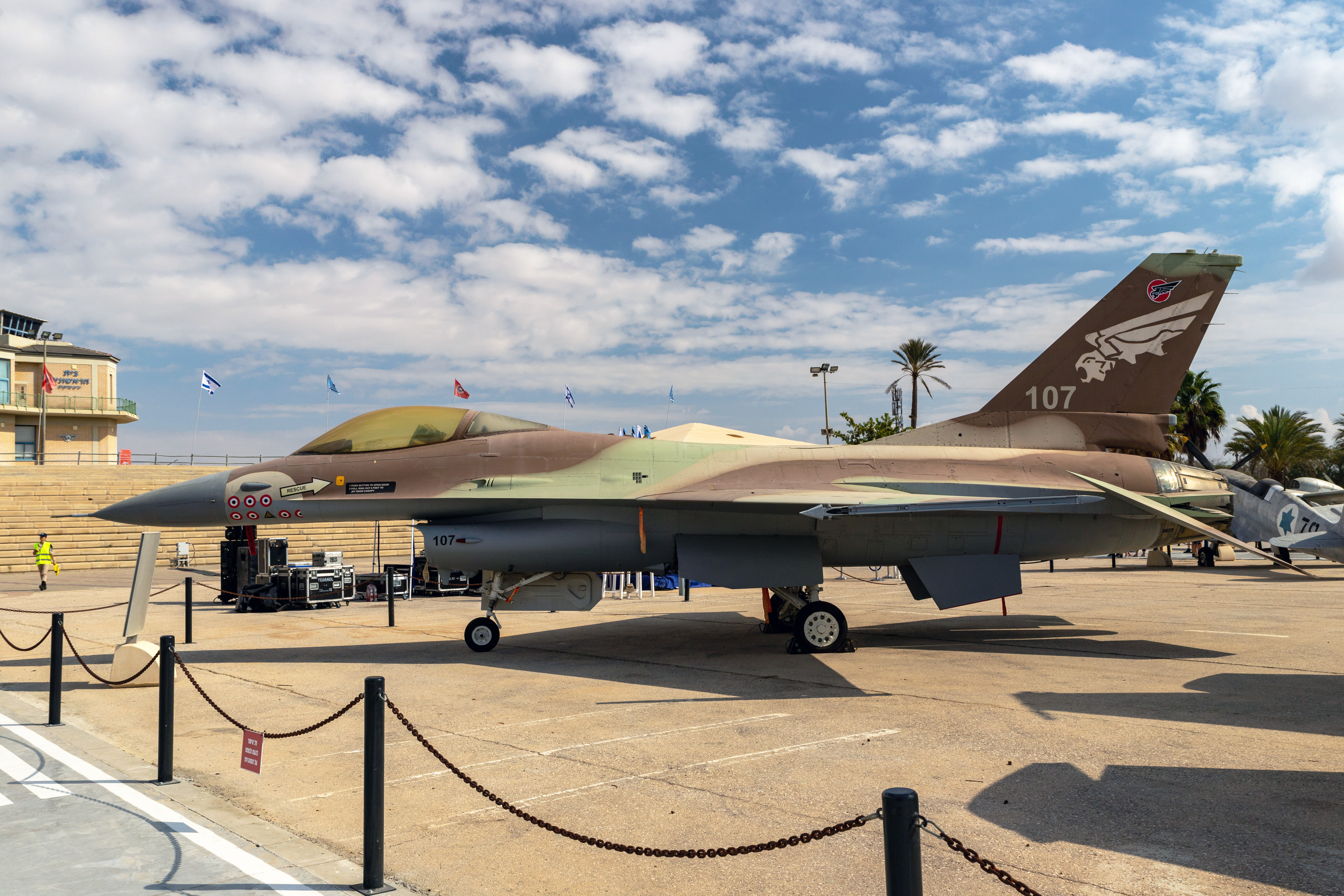
F-16A Netz 107 on display, 2022

F-16A

- 107 – On display at the Israeli Air Force Museum in Hatzerim Airbase, Beer Sheva. This F-16 was credited with 6.5 shoot-downs of enemy aircraft and took part in Operation Opera in which the Osirak nuclear reactor was destroyed.

=== Indonesia ===
F-16C

- TS-1643 – On display at the Roesmin Nurjadin Air Force Base in Pekanbaru, Riau. This F-16 caught fire when taking off from Halim Perdanakusuma International Airport in 2015, and was cosmetically restored for display after the incident.

=== Italy ===
F-16A

- 82-1021 – On display at Aviano Air Base in the markings of the 31st Fighter Wing. Operated by the Aeronautica Militare as MM7245 between 2003 and 2010.
- MM7240 – Pylon display at Trapani–Birgi Air Base, Sicily.
- MM7251 – On display at the Italian Air Force Museum, Vigna di Valle.

=== Japan ===
F-16A

- 78-0021 – On display at the Misawa Aviation & Science Museum, Misawa Air Base, Aomori Prefecture.
- 78-0053 – Pylon display at Misawa Air Base.

=== Netherlands ===
F-16AM J-063 on display, 2026

F-16A & F-16AM

- J-063 - On display at the Nationaal Militair Museum at the former Soesterberg Air Base. The aircraft shot down a Serbian Mikoyan MiG-29 during Operation Allied Force in 1999, and was subsequently nicknamed "Mig Killer."
- J-196 - Stored at Volkel Air Base for static display for events at the airbase.
- J-228 - Pylon display at the Leeuwarden Air Base main gate.
- J-238 - On display as a gate guard at Eindhoven Air Base.
- J-246 - Pylon display on the N264 / Zeelandsedijk roundabout near the Volkel Air Base main gate.
- J-616 - Pylon display at Volkel Air Base as a gate guard, replacing tail number J-240. This was the first F-16 to be stationed at the base in 1982.
- J-866 - On display outside of Koninklijke Militaire Academie

F-16B & F-16BM

- J-066 -In the collection of the Nationaal Militair Museum, being a former Test Aircraft nicknamed "the Orange Jumper"
- J-259 - On display at Leeuwarden Air Base. Displayed as configured when delivered as the first F-16 to the Royal Netherlands Air Force.
- J-260 - Pylon display at Woensdrecht Air Base.
- J-266 - On display outside at De oranje Kazerne, Arnhem.

=== Norway ===
F-16AM

- 674 – Stored at the Norwegian Aviation Museum, Bodø, pending display.
- 687 – On display at the Norwegian Armed Forces Aircraft Collection, Gardermoen.

=== Portugal ===
F-16A

- 15150 – Pylon display at Monte Real Air Base.

=== Serbia ===
F-16C

- 88-0550 – Partial wreckage of a USAF aircraft shot down during Operation Allied Force on 2 May 1999; on display at the Aeronautical Museum Belgrade.

=== Thailand ===
F-16A

- 10200 – On display at Royal Thai Air Force Museum, Bangkok.
- 10315 – On display at Navaminda Kasatriyadhiraj Royal Thai Air Force Academy, Saraburi Province.

=== Turkey ===
F-16C

- 89-0032 – On display at Istanbul Aviation Museum.

=== Ukraine ===
F-16B

- 89-0305 – On display at War Museum of the National Defence University of Ukraine.

=== United States ===
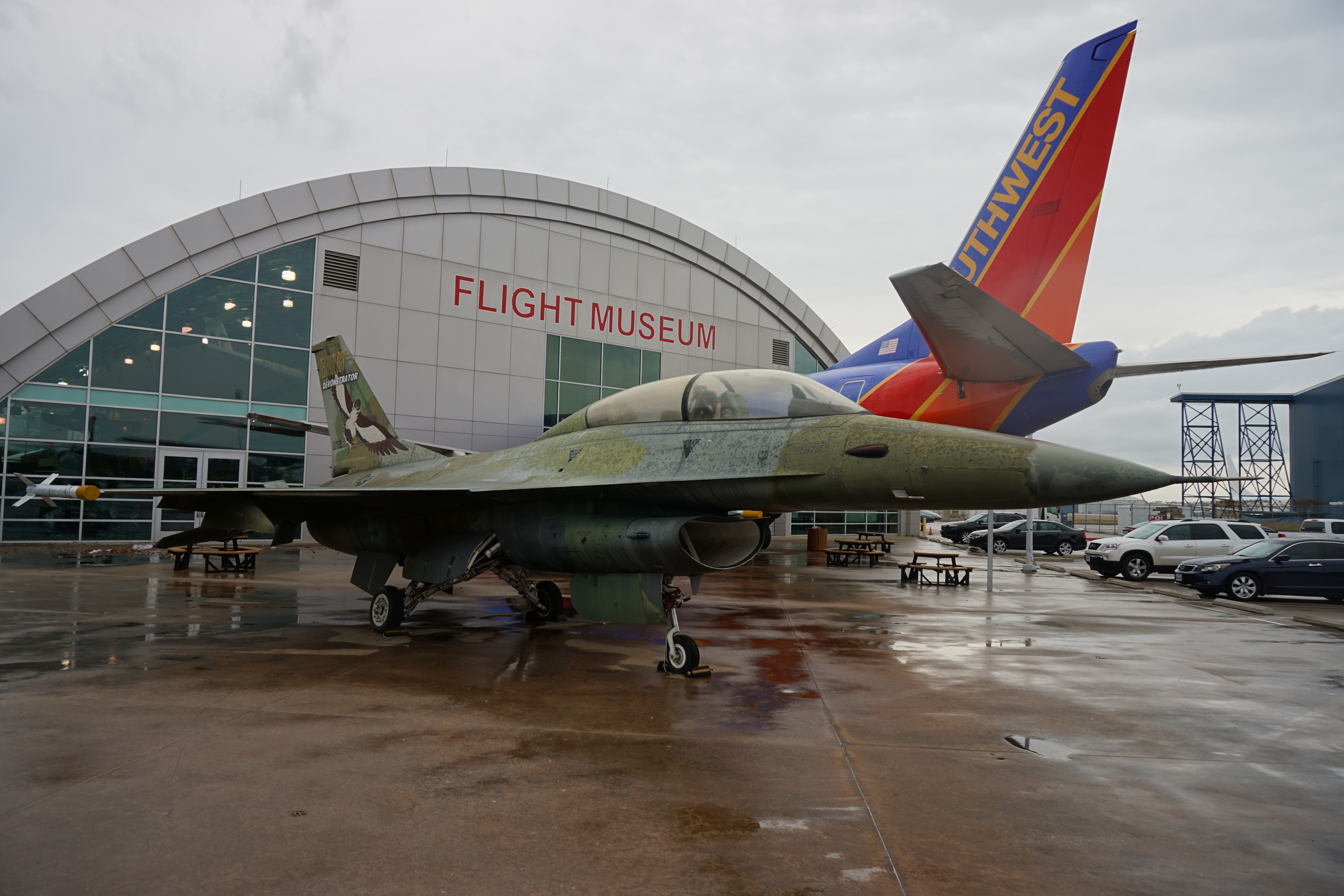
The YF-16B at the Frontiers of Flight Museum

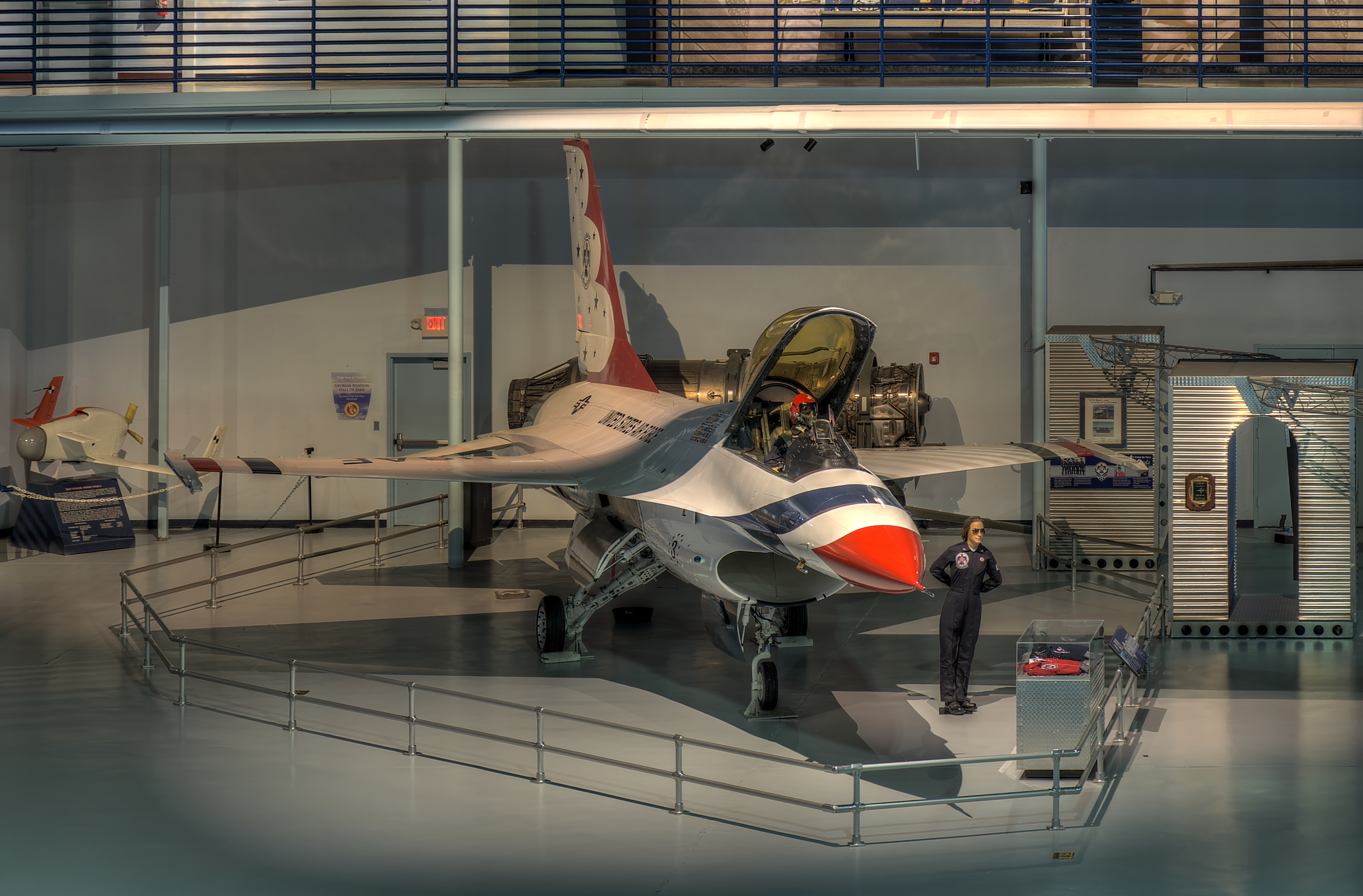
F-16A display at the Museum of Aviation, Robins AFB

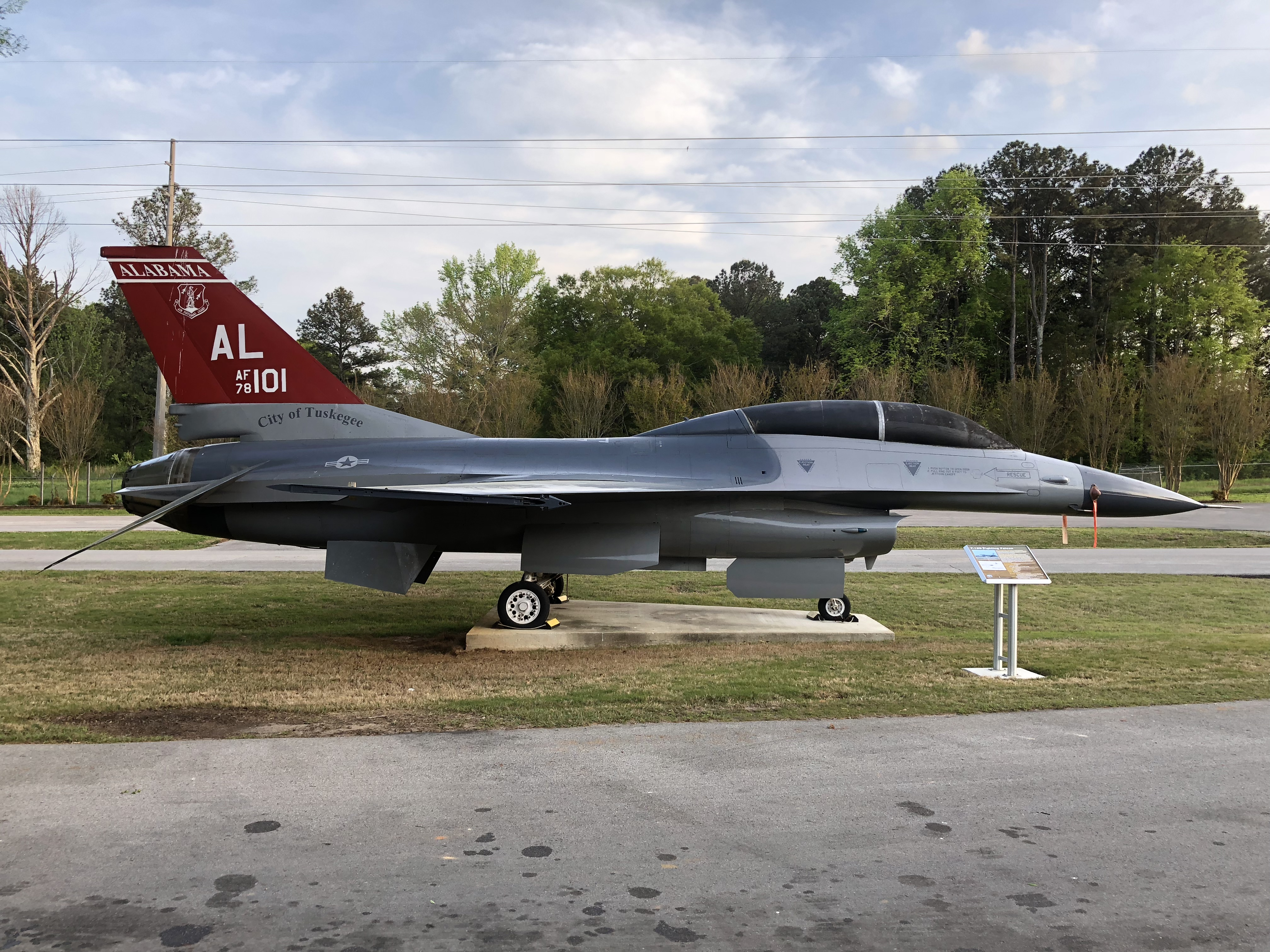
F-16B on display at the Aviation Challenge campus of the U.S. Space & Rocket Center in Huntsville, AL; vertical stabilizer painted red as an acknowledgment to Tuskegee Airmen.

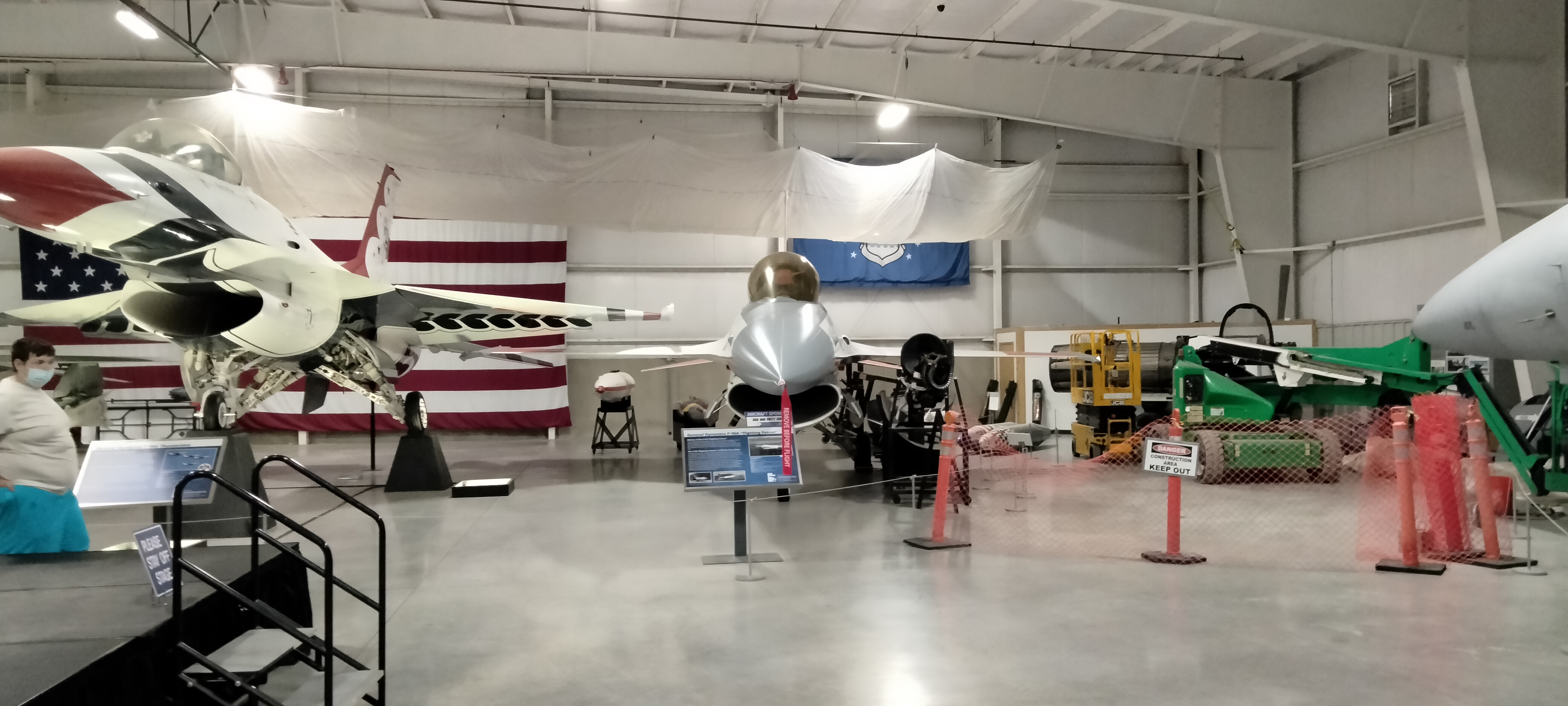
F-16s at Hill Aerospace Museum

YF-16

- 72-1567 – Virginia Air and Space Center, Hampton, Virginia
- 72-1568 – under restoration for display at the Fort Worth Aviation Museum in Fort Worth, Texas.

YF-16A (Full-scale development)

- 75-0745 – Used as a traveling exhibit, on loan from the National Museum of the United States Air Force, Wright-Patterson AFB, Ohio.
- 75-0746 – Pylon-mounted gate guard, McEntire Air National Guard Base, South Carolina.
- 75-0748 – Cadet Area Terrazzo, U.S. Air Force Academy, Colorado.
- 75-0750 – Experimental Aircraft Display Hangar, National Museum of the United States Air Force, Wright-Patterson AFB, Ohio

YF-16B (FSD)

- 75-0751 – under restoration at the Air Force Flight Center Museum, Edwards AFB, California.
- 75-0752 – Frontiers of Flight Museum, Dallas, Texas

F-16A

- 78-0001 – Langley Air Force Base Memorial Park, Virginia. First production model F-16A delivered to USAF.
- 78-0005 – 162d Fighter Wing Park, Tucson Air National Guard Base, Arizona
- 78-0008 – Pylon display at the D.C. Armory, Washington, D.C.
- 78-0025 – Valiant Air Command Warbird Museum, Titusville, FL. Formerly a gate guard, Burlington Air National Guard Base, Vermont
- 78-0042 – Gate guard, Montgomery Air National Guard Base/Dannelly Field, Alabama
- 78-0050 – On static display at the National Museum of Nuclear Science & History, Albuquerque, New Mexico.
- 78-0052 – Eielson AFB Heritage Park, Eielson AFB, Alaska
- 78-0058 – Pylon display at Soldiers Walk Memorial Park, Arcadia, Wisconsin.
- 78-0059 – Selfridge Military Air Museum and Air Park, Selfridge ANGB, Michigan
- 78-0061 – Highland Home "Flying Squadron" High School Football Field, Highland Home, Alabama
- 78-0065 – 388th Fighter Wing and 419th Fighter Wing combined Headquarters, Hill AFB, Utah
- 78-0066 – On display in Kansas Air National Guard Memorial Park area, McConnell AFB, Kansas
- 79-0290 – On display at Great Falls Air National Guard Base, Montana.
- 79-0296 – Gate guard, Jacksonville Air National Guard Base, Florida
- 79-0307 – On display at Cannon AFB Air Park, Cannon AFB, New Mexico
- 79-0309 – Base park area adjacent to USAFCENT Headquarters, Shaw AFB, South Carolina. Painted as 20th Fighter Wing F-16C 93-0534 as a memorial to Maj. Brison Phillips, killed 19 March 2000 while flying the aforementioned aircraft.
- 79-0312 – Pylon display, 8th Street Park, Douglas, Arizona
- 79-0326 – Gate guard, Homestead Air Reserve Base, Florida
- 79-0327 – Pylon display at Luke Air Force Base, Arizona. Painted in 302d Fighter Squadron markings, to include World War II Tuskegee Airmen "Red Tails" empennage
- 79-0334 – USS Alabama Battleship Memorial Park, Mobile, Alabama
- 79-0337 – Ground-mobile static display aircraft, normally located at Hancock Field Air National Guard Base, New York. Used by New York Air National Guard's 174th Attack Wing (former 174th Fighter Wing) at fairs and expositions for Air National Guard recruiting.
- 79-0345 – Pylon display at Veterans Memorial Park adjacent to Atlanta Regional Airport, Peachtree City, Georgia.
- 79-0352 – On static display with 23d Wing at Moody AFB, Georgia
- 79-0357 – On static display at Camp Johnson, Vermont.
- 79-0364 – Pylon display near the entrance to Duluth Air National Guard Base, Duluth, Minnesota. Fictitiously marked as "79-148".
- 79-0365 – Pending restoration and static display, March Field Air Museum, Riverside, California.
- 79-0366 – Memorial park static display, Mountain Home AFB, Idaho
- 79-0368 – On static display at Truax Field Air National Guard Base, Madison, Wisconsin.
- 79-0373 – On display at Buckley Space Force Base, Colorado. Aircraft painted in markings of Colorado Air National Guard's 140th Fighter Wing based at Buckley SFB.
- 79-0387 – Pylon display at Abraham Lincoln Capital Airport, Springfield, Illinois.
- 79-0388 – On display at the Hill Aerospace Museum, Hill Air Force Base, Utah
- 79-0402 – On display at the Hill Aerospace Museum, Hill Air Force Base, Utah
- 79-0403 – Intrepid Sea, Air & Space Museum, New York City, New York
- 79-0407 – Gate guard at Arnold Air Force Base, Tullahoma, Tennessee.
- 80-0481 – Display on Parade Ground, Sheppard AFB, Texas
- 80-0498 – Static display at the Pearl Harbor Aviation Museum, Honolulu, Hawaii.
- 80-0499 – On display at the Pueblo Weisbrod Aircraft Museum, Pueblo, Colorado.
- 80-0509 – On display at the Pima Air & Space Museum, Tucson, Arizona. Formerly of the 465th Fighter Squadron, based at Tinker Air Force Base, Oklahoma before retirement.
- 80-0519 – Gate guard at Toledo Air National Guard Base, Ohio.
- 80-0522 – Gate guard at Des Moines Air National Guard Base, Iowa.
- 80-0527 – Former Arizona Air National Guard 162d Fighter Wing aircraft on display at the Pima Air & Space Museum, Tucson, Arizona. In original Arizona Air National Guard markings.
- 80-0528 – City park in Pinellas Park, Florida. Painted in markings of 56th Tactical Training Wing-cum-56th Fighter Wing, previously assigned to nearby MacDill AFB in the 1980s and early 1990s.
- 80-0543 – On display at the Castle Air Museum, Atwater, California in the markings of the 144th Fighter Wing of the California Air National Guard.
- 80-0567 – Pylon display at Lackland Air Force Base, Texas, marked as F-16C 87-0255.
- 80-0573 – Air Force Armament Museum, Eglin AFB, Florida
- 80-0605 – Gate guard at Fargo Air National Guard Base, North Dakota, marked as 82-1012.
- 80-0612 – Memorial park static display at Puerto Rico National Guard's Camp Santiago, Salinas, Puerto Rico. Former Puerto Rico Air National Guard F-16ADF, painted in markings of PRANG's former 198th Fighter Squadron, but marked as 81612.
- 81-0663 – On display in United States Air Force Thunderbirds markings at the National Museum of the United States Air Force, Wright-Patterson AFB, Dayton, Ohio.
- 81-0676 – Museum of Aviation, Robins AFB, Warner Robins, Georgia. Used by the USAF Thunderbirds from 1982 to 1991.
- 81-0678 – On display at the Hill Aerospace Museum, Hill Air Force Base, Utah. Used by the USAF Thunderbirds from 1982 to 1991.
- 81-0686 – On display at the Linear Air Park, Dyess Air Force Base, Texas. Previously displayed at Terre Haute Air National Guard Base, Indiana.
- 81-0687 – Gate guard at Luke Air Force Base, Arizona.
- 81-0721 – MacDill AFB Memorial Park, MacDill AFB, Florida. Former Florida Air National Guard 125th Fighter Wing F-16ADF repainted in markings of a 56th Fighter Wing F-16A previously assigned to MacDill in the 1980s.
- 81-0759 – Pylon display at Rogue Valley International–Medford Airport, Medford, Oregon.
- 81-0789 – On display at the HEARTS Veterans Museum, Huntsville, Texas.
- 81-0807 – On display at Minnesota Air National Guard Museum, Saint Paul, Minnesota.
- 82-0910 – Pylon display at Kingsley Field Air National Guard Base, Klamath Falls, Oregon.
- 82-0926 – On display at Fargo Air National Guard Base, Fargo, North Dakota.
- 82-0928 – On display at Sioux City Air National Guard Base, Iowa. Painted gold and marked as F-16C 85-1565 in a recreation of the 185th Fighter Wing's 50th anniversary scheme from 1996. Previously marked as F-16C 85-1547.
- 82-0929 – Pylon display at Joint Base Lewis–McChord, Washington, adjacent to Western Air Defense Sector headquarters. Retains North Dakota ANG markings as it appeared prior to retirement.
- 82-0930 – On display at Ellington Field Joint Reserve Base, Houston, Texas
- 82-0970 – On display at Ebbing Air National Guard Base, Fort Smith, Arkansas.

F-16B

- 78-0077 – On static display at Pima Air and Space Museum, Tucson, Arizona. Formerly of the 157th Tactical Fighter Squadron, South Carolina Air National Guard
- 78-0088 – On display at the Naval Air Station Wildwood Aviation Museum, Cape May County Airport, New Jersey
- 78-0089 – On static display at the Estrella Warbirds Museum, Paso Robles, California.
- 78-0101 – On display at United States Space Camp / Aviation Challenge, Huntsville, Alabama
- 78-0107 – On display adjacent to Parade Ground, Lackland Air Force Base, Texas
- 79-0420 – Pylon display Peoria Air National Guard Base, Illinois. Marked as 82-1042, which crashed after a midair collision on 23 June 1993.
- 79-0430 – Stafford Air & Space Museum, Weatherford, Oklahoma
- 80-0633 – Yanks Air Museum, Chino, California.
- 80-0634 – Pylon display at 412th Test Wing Headquarters, Edwards Air Force Base, California.
- 81-0816 – Pylon display gate guard, Atlantic City Air National Guard Base, New Jersey
- 81-0817 – Russell Military Museum, Russell, Illinois.

F-16C

- 83-1126 – Pylon display at Hill Memorial Park, Hill AFB, Utah
- 83-1165 – Pylon display at Burlington Air National Guard Base, Vermont.
- 84-1264 – Static display at Baer Field Heritage Air Park adjacent to Fort Wayne Air National Guard Base, Indiana. Aircraft retains Air Force Heritage paint scheme honoring 358th Fighter Group during World War II.
- 84-1393 – Pylon display at Texas National Guard's Camp Mabry, Austin, Texas. Former Texas Air National Guard 147th Fighter Wing/111th Fighter Squadron aircraft.
- 85-1438 – Planned for static display at the National Museum of the United States Air Force in Dayton, Ohio. This aircraft was piloted by then-Maj. Dan Caine of the 121st Fighter Squadron patrolling the airspace over Washington D.C. during the September 11 attacks in 2001.
- 85-1461 – Planned for static display at Joint Base Andrews. This aircraft was piloted by then-Lt. Col. Marc H. Sasseville during the September 11 attacks, escorting Air Force One on its return Washington D.C.
- 85-1469 – Static display at Joe Foss Field Air National Guard Station, South Dakota
- 86-0255 – Planned for static display at the American Heritage Museum in Stow, Massachusetts. This aircraft was piloted by then-1st Lt. Heather Penney during the September 11 attacks with orders to intercept and possibly force down United Airlines Flight 93 before it reached Washington D.C.
- 86-0291 – Gate guard at Nellis Air Force Base, Nevada.
- 87-0323 – Preserved as Thunderbird 1 in front of the USAF Air Demonstration Squadron/United States Air Force Thunderbirds hangar, Nellis Air Force Base, Nevada. Assigned to Thunderbirds in the 1992–2008 timeframe. Had number 1 attached on 11 June 1999; number 2 in the 2004 season; number 3 on 3 March 2003 and number 4 on 1 April 2005.

F-16N

- 163269 – San Diego Aerospace Museum, San Diego, California
- 163271 – Pacific Coast Air Museum, Santa Rosa, California
- 163277 – Palm Springs Air Museum, Palm Springs, California
- 163569 – NAS Fort Worth JRB, Fort Worth, Texas. Fictitiously marked as 86-0301 (a serial belonging to an F-16C) in AFRC colors of the 457th Fighter Squadron, 301st Fighter Wing.
- 163572 – National Naval Aviation Museum, Naval Air Station Pensacola, Pensacola, Florida
- 163576 – Air Power Park, Naval Air Station Fallon, Nevada

F-16XL

- 75-0747 – On display at the Air Force Flight Test Museum, Edwards Air Force Base, California.
- 75-0749 – Under restoration at the Air Force Flight Test Museum, Edwards Air Force Base, California.

Other

- 84-1228 – On static display at the Joe Davies Heritage Airpark, Palmdale, California. This aircraft is a composite of the rear fuselage of F-16B 78-0105 and the forward section of F-16C 84-1228, and is displayed under the latter serial number. Both donor aircraft were damaged in accidents.

=== Venezuela ===
F-16A

- 6023 – On display at the Aeronautics Museum of Maracay, Aragua.
