= 152nd Fighter Squadron =

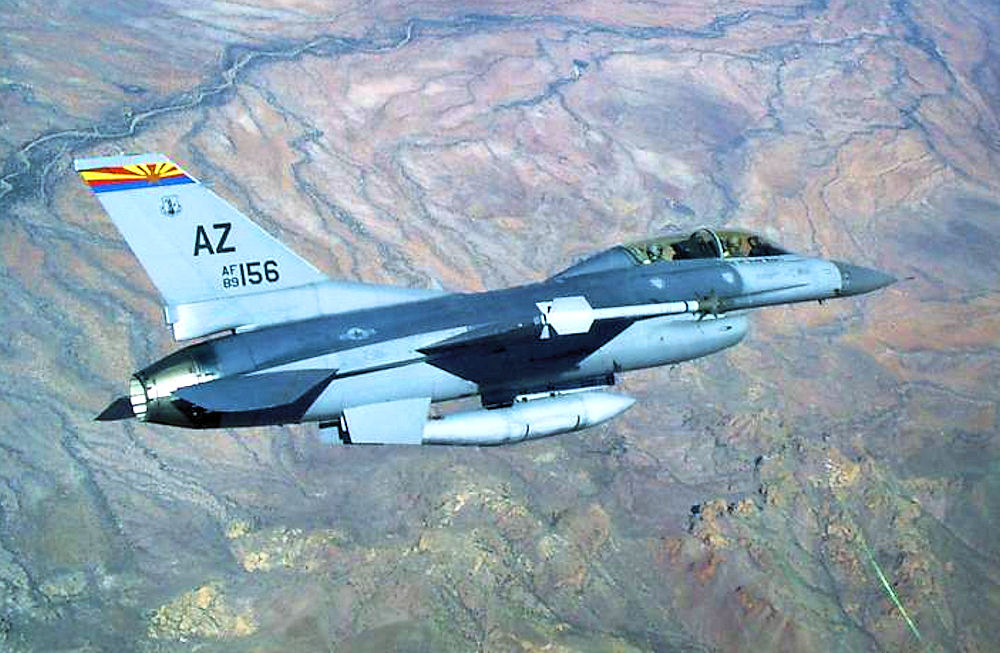
- F-16D block 42 #89-2156 taken over Arivaca, Arizona
- Active: 1985–Present
- Country: United States
- Allegiance: Arizona
- Branch: Air National Guard
- Type: Squadron
- Role: Foreign Military Sales pilot training
- Part of: Arizona Air National Guard
- Garrison/HQ: Tucson Air National Guard Base, Tucson, Arizona.
- Nickname(s): "Tigers"
- Tail Code: Arizona state flag tail stripe "AZ"

Insignia
- 152nd Fighter Squadron emblem (approved 26 October 1959)

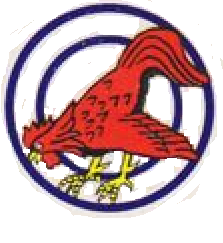
- 152nd Observation Squadron emblem

The 152nd Fighter Squadron (152 FS) is a unit of the Arizona Air National Guard 162nd Fighter Wing located at Tucson Air National Guard Base, Arizona, United States. The 152nd is equipped with the F-16 Fighting Falcon.

== History ==
=== Origins ===
In 1956, the United States Air Force, in an effort to upgrade to an all jet fighter force, required Air National Guard Aerospace Defense Command units to upgrade to jet-powered aircraft. The Rhode Island Air National Guard, 152nd Fighter-Interceptor Squadron, stationed at T.F. Green Municipal Airport in Warwick, was scheduled to replace its aging F-51D Mustang interceptors to F-84 Thunderjets. However, National Guard authorities found themselves in a conflict over the use of T.F. Green Municipal Airport in Warwick with its controlling Airport Commission with regards to using the airport for tactical jet operations.

Unable to resolve these differences and no suitable location in the state to move the squadron, the Air Force removed the jets from the state and the National Guard Bureau transferred the 152nd Fighter Interceptor Squadron to the Arizona Air National Guard.

However, the National Guard Bureau's desire to have an Air National Guard flying unit located in every state brought a new mission and the numeric designation to the Rhode Island Air National Guard, the 143d Air Resupply Squadron using propeller-driven aircraft. The "new" 152nd FIS was activated as a new Arizona Air National Guard organization with no prior history or lineage; the 143d Air Resupply Squadron was bestowed the lineage and history of the inactivated Rhode Island ANG 152nd Fighter Interceptor Squadron.

=== Arizona Air National Guard ===
==== Air Defense ====
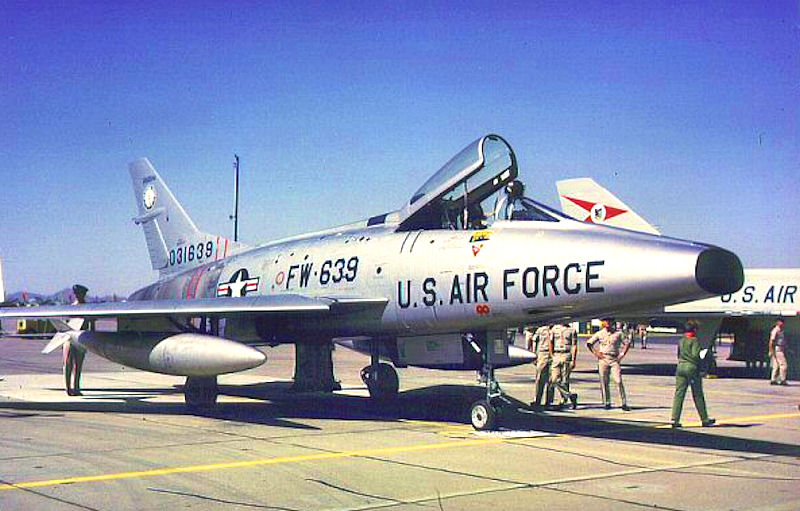
152nd Fighter-Interceptor Squadron – F-100A 53-1639

Upon the unit's activation in Tucson, the 152nd was equipped with F-86A Sabre day fighters to use as interceptors. Its mission was the air defense of Southern Arizona. At that time of its arrival, its facilities at Tucson Municipal Airport consisted of an old adobe farmhouse and a dirt-floor hangar with enough space for three aircraft. In 1958, the F-100A Super Sabre arrived to supplement the F-86s.

Despite the facility limitations, the Air Defense Command's Headquarters 4th Air Force judged the 152nd FIS outstanding in accomplishing its air defense mission. It declared the unit "Best in the West" in the 1950s and the early 1960s.

Late in 1968 the unit received its first of five Air Force Outstanding Unit Citations for converting from the F-100-day-fighter to the all-weather F-102 "Delta Dagger" interceptor aircraft in just 10 months. The unit did it faster and better than any other Air National Guard unit converting to the F-102.

==== Fighter Training ====
On 1 July 1969, the Arizona Air National Guard 152nd Fighter Interceptor Squadron was authorized to expand to a group level, and the 162nd Tactical Fighter Training Group was established by the National Guard Bureau. With the change of status, the new 162nd TFTG was assigned to Tactical Air Command. The re-designated 152nd Tactical Fighter Training Squadron became the group's flying squadron. Other squadrons assigned into the group were the 162nd Headquarters, 162nd Material Squadron (Maintenance), 162nd Combat Support Squadron, and the 162nd USAF Dispensary.

With the United States withdrawal from the Vietnam War commencing in 1970, the North American F-100 Super Sabre was being retired from its active-duty mission, being replaced by either the F-4 Phantom II tactical fighter and A-7D Corsair II close air support aircraft. The F-100s were being transferred to the Air National Guard, which was upgrading from Republic F-84 Thunderjets and North American F-86 Sabres. The 162nd Tactical Fighter Training Group was designated as the Air National Guard training unit with the mission of the unit to train combat-ready pilots for the Air National Guard (Replacement Training Unit or RTU). The 152nd TFTS was equipped with the F-100C Super Sabre aircraft with a few dual-control twin-seat F-100F trainers. The unit graduated their first students in 1970. In 1972 the F-100C was replaced by the more advanced F-100D. Shortly afterward, the unit formed the Air National Guard F-100 Fighter Weapons School in Tucson. This school taught Air Guard and Reserve fighter pilots from throughout the country to effectively use advanced tactics and weapons technology.

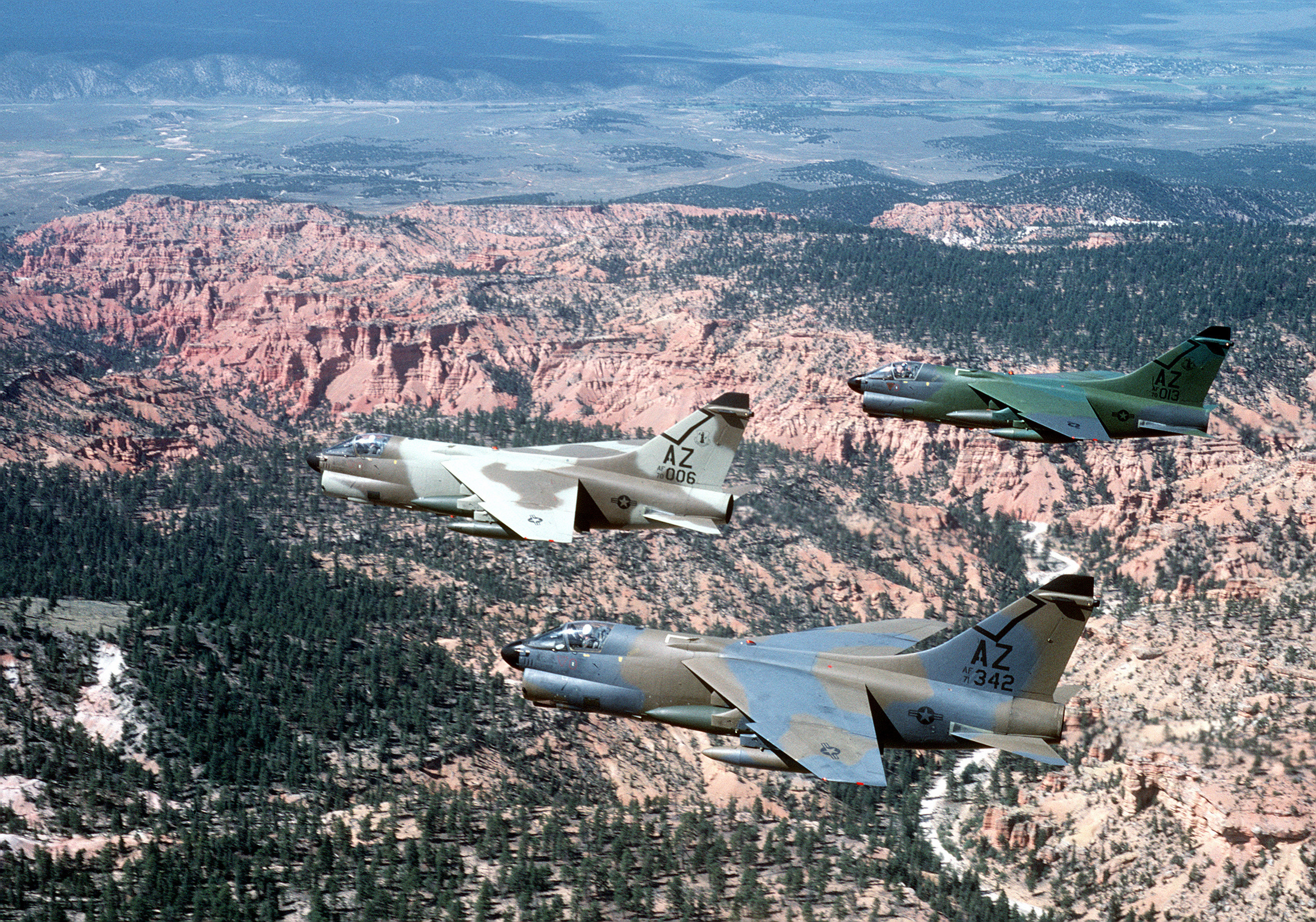
A-7D Corsair II aircraft (s/n 70-1006, 70–1013, 71–0342) from the 152nd Tactical Fighter Squadron, fly in formation over the desert near Tucson, Arizona on 19 September 1981. The aircraft, each in a different paint scheme, were being tested against desert and forest background for visibility.

In 1977, with the transfer of the A-7D Corsair IIs to the Air National Guard beginning in large numbers, 152nd TFTS, along with its F-100s, began to receive twelve aircraft, primarily from the active-duty 354th Tactical Fighter Wing which was the first TAC wing to transition to the A-10 Thunderbolt II. The F-100 flight would continue to train F-100 students while the A-7 flight began to develop training syllabus for Corsair II students. In 1978 the F-100s were retired and the squadron became the A-7D training school for the ANG. For this transition, the unit received its second Air Force Outstanding Unit Award for successfully continuing to train F-100 students while completing the most challenging conversion in the unit's history.

During the transition from F-100 to A-7D training in 1978, the squadron became a checkout and modification organization for new A-7D aircraft being produced by LTV. These new aircraft were produced due to a Congressional mandate to maintain the A-7D production line in Dallas, and the new aircraft were flown to Tucson for acceptance inspection. Upon receipt of the aircraft, the aircraft would be fully inspected and all discrepancies noted and repaired, being brought up to ANG standards. It would actually take about five or six months for the squadron to fly a series of check flights and work all the kinks out of the aircraft. Once completed, the squadron would transfer the aircraft to its assigned ANG squadron around the United States. Between 1978 and 1980 a total of 24 new A-7D aircraft were received, of which the squadron increased in size from 12 to a total of 24 aircraft. Because the unit was a training school, its aircraft were flown much heavily than other ANG squadrons which were also more demanding and stressful on the airframes. In order to keep the maximum number of aircraft fully operational, many aircraft were transferred to Tucson from other squadrons and the training aircraft in Tucson were sent to other units to insure all aircraft did not have excessive hours or stress on them.

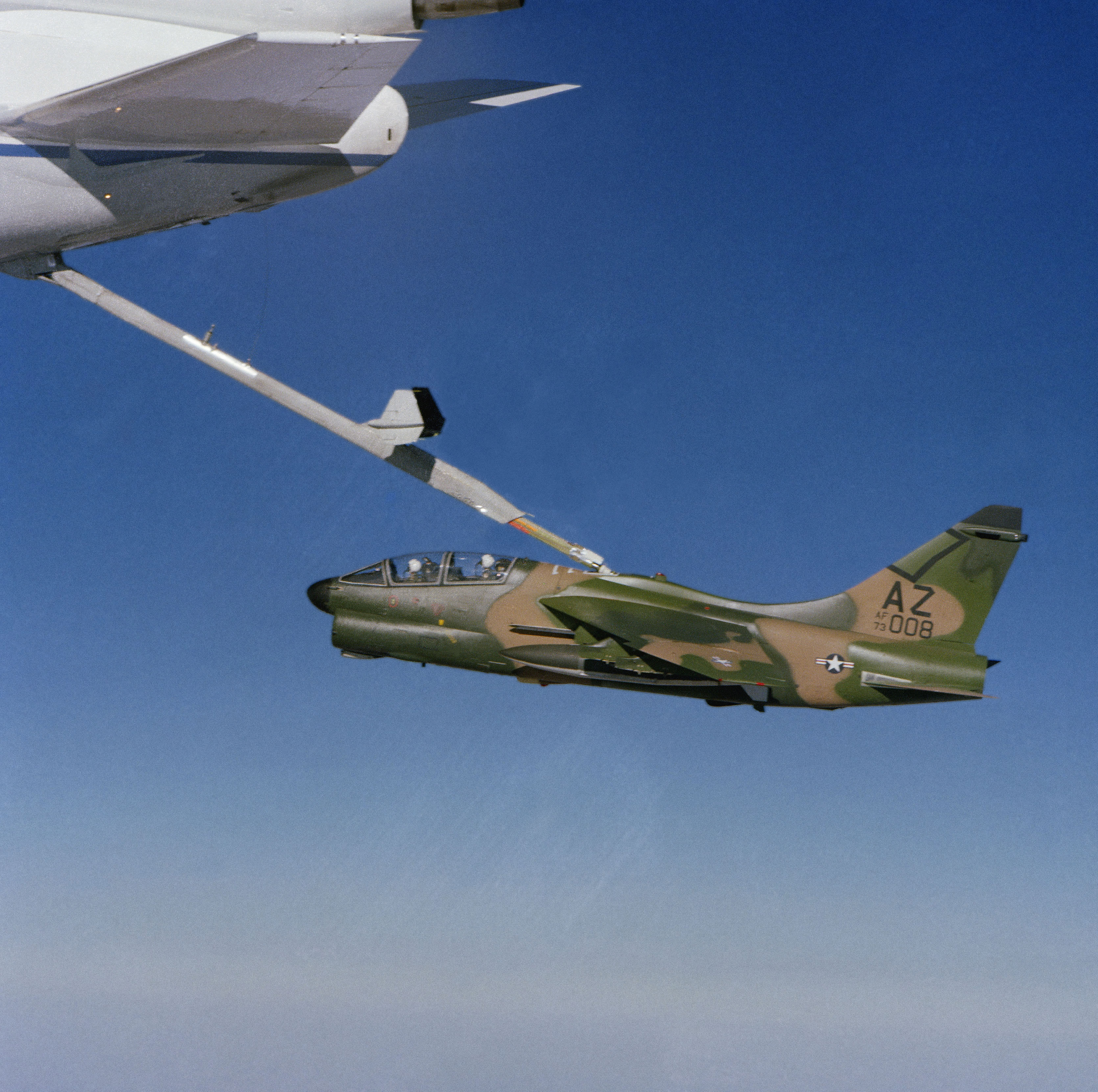
152nd TFS A-7D 73-1008 modified to the twin-seat A-7K configuration. This aircraft was received by the squadron in 1989, after being used by the F-117A Nighthawk Stealth Fighter program as a training aircraft.

In 1981, the squadron began receiving new A-7K a twin-seat dual-control trainer for the A-7D from LTV The A-7K was a fully combat-capable aircraft and the squadron continued its acceptance inspection mission as well as its training mission. Eventually 20 A-7K aircraft were added to the squadron, along with its A-7Ds. The last of the A-7Ks were received in 1983, and with the shutdown of the assembly line in Dallas, the inspection and acceptance mission came to a close. The unit received its third Air Force Outstanding Unit Award for this and began another dimension in training in 1983 when the unit added the A-7 Fighter Weapons School, which replaced the F-100 FWS that was closed in 1978. In 1984, the 195th Tactical Fighter Training Squadron was activated as a 2nd RTU.

In addition to the normal stream of Air National Guard pilots, during the early 1980s, the 152nd became a covert training unit for active-duty F-117A Nighthawk pilots. The A-7's cockpit layout and avionics were considered similar to those in the F-117. Pilots assigned to the F-117 program required a minimum of 1,000 fighter hours, and nearly all of the initial cadre for the F-117 were A-7D pilots due to the similar flight characteristics of the A-7D and F-117. Initially pilots in the program were sent to Tucson for a quick refresher course in A-7Ds that included academics, simulator time and six or seven flights to re-qualify them in the Corsair. When other fighter pilots began to be assigned, they were assigned to either a three or six-month course. depending on their experience in fighters.

In 1988, the unit began converting to the Block 10 F-16A Fighting Falcon, which active-duty units were transferring to the ANG with the delivery of the more advanced F-16C. This transition took several years, with the last Corsairs being transferred out in 1990. The training mission remained after the conversion, but the older F-16A Block 10 airframes were not quite suited to fulfill this mission. Therefore, a number of more modern F-16A Block 15 airframes were introduced in the squadron after 1989 to be able to maintain a more modern training syllabus.

In 1992 the ANG Staff decided to modernize the training that the squadron was providing to ANG crews as well as regular USAF units or NATO F-16 pilots. Therefore, more modern F-16C Block 42 airframes were delivered to the squadron. This opened a lot of opportunities. This block is specifically designed for attack operations during day and nighttime. It uses the advanced LANTIRN pod and the squadron has been training other crews in the usage of these systems. In recent years these airframes have been further upgraded with the CCIP program to make it possible for them to reach 8,000 flying hours easily. A number of additions (like a new MMC, an advanced AIFF system, etc.) were added to these airframes to further modernize their operations and make it possible to adjust the training sequence to include these advanced electronics.

=== Lineage ===
- Designated 152nd Fighter Interceptor Squadron, and allotted to Arizona ANG, 1956

Extended federal recognition and activated, 1 July 1956
Re-designated: 152nd Tactical Fighter Training Squadron, on 1 July 1969
Re-designated: 152nd Tactical Fighter Squadron, 26 July 1979
Re-designated: 152nd Fighter Squadron, 16 March 1992

=== Assignments ===
- Arizona Air National Guard, 1 July 1956

Gained by: 34th Air Division, Air Defense Command
Gained by: Los Angeles Air Defense Sector, Air Defense Command, 1 July 1960
Gained by: 27th Air Division, Air Defense Command, 1 April 1966

- 162nd Tactical Fighter Training Group, 1 July 1969
- 162nd Tactical Fighter Group, 26 July 1979
- 162nd Operations Group, 16 March 1992

=== Stations ===
- Tucson International Airport (Later Tucson Air National Guard Base), 1 July 1956

Designated: Tucson Air National Guard Base, 1991–Present

=== Aircraft ===
- F-86A Sabre, 1956–1966
- F-100A Super Sabre, 1958–1966
- F-102A Delta Dagger, 1966–1969
- F-100C Super Sabre, 1969–1977
- A-7D/K Corsair II, 1977–1992
- F-16A Block 15 Fighting Falcon, 1986–1992
- F-16C Block 42 Fighting Falcon, 1992 – present
