= Air National Guard Air Force Reserve Command Test Center =

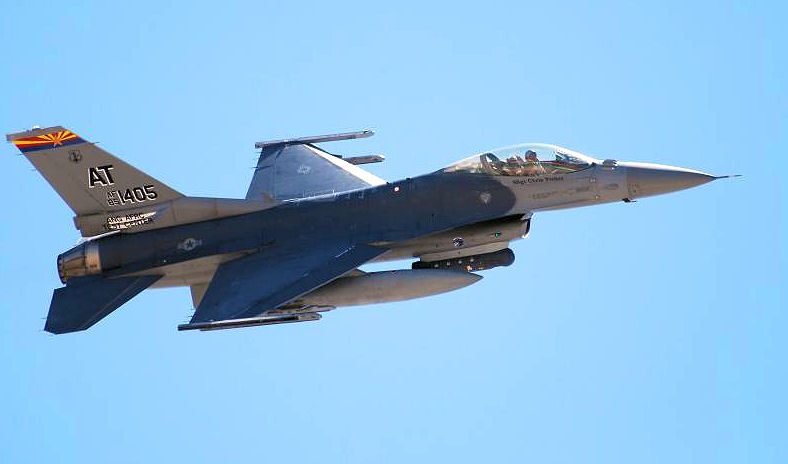
- Air National Guard Air Force Reserve Command Test Center (AATC) F-16C Block 25 85-1405
- Active: 1990–present
- Country: United States
- Allegiance: Arizona
- Branch: Air National Guard
- Type: Squadron
- Role: Operational Testing
- Part of: Arizona Air National Guard
- Garrison/HQ: Tucson Air National Guard Base, Tucson, Arizona.
- Tail Code: Arizona state flag tail stripe "AT"

Insignia
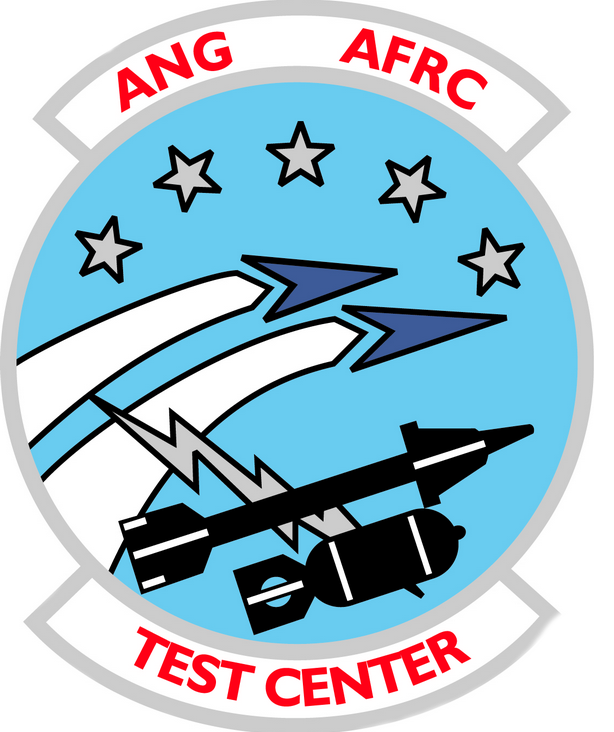
- Air National Guard Air Force Reserve Command Test Center emblem

The Air National Guard Air Force Reserve Command Test Center (AATC) is a unit of the Air National Guard, stationed at Tucson Air National Guard Base, Arizona. It is a tenant unit hosted by the 162d Fighter Wing, Arizona Air National Guard.

== Overview ==
AATC conducts operational test (OT) on behalf of each United States Air Force Major Command and possesses 7 F-16C Fighting Falcon Block 25/32 aircraft to support the primary mission of F-16 Operational Flight Program (OFP) testing.

AATC also operates a temporary A-10A Thunderbolt II OT detachment at Davis–Monthan AFB, with the support of the 917th Wing, Barksdale AFB, Louisiana and the host 355th Wing at Davis–Monthan.

The unit also is tasked with and accomplishes testing on a wide variety of other Air Reserve Command aircraft, including F-16 Block 40/42, B-52, F-15A/B, HH-60, HC-130 and electronic combat systems for those aircraft. AATC has also conducted testing in support of Air Mobility Command on C-130, C-5, KC-10 and KC-135 aircraft.

AATC is uniquely postured to take advantage of modernization efforts that are funded by the National Guard and Reserve Equipment Account (NGREA) which is unprogrammed funding suited to near-term improvements. AATC efforts exploiting NGREA resources complement long-range AF programs and have enabled transformational modernization efforts such as Night Vision Devices for fighter aircraft (first fielded in the ARC), Situational Awareness Data Link (SADL), a low-cost datalink complementing AF network enabled operations, and Litening Targeting Pods, which greatly increased the number of precision strike aircraft in the AF inventory and revolutionized how the AF delivers joint fires and conducts non-traditional intelligence, surveillance, and reconnaissance.
