= Goldwater Air National Guard Base =

US military facility in Phoenix, Arizona

- Phoenix, Arizona in United States
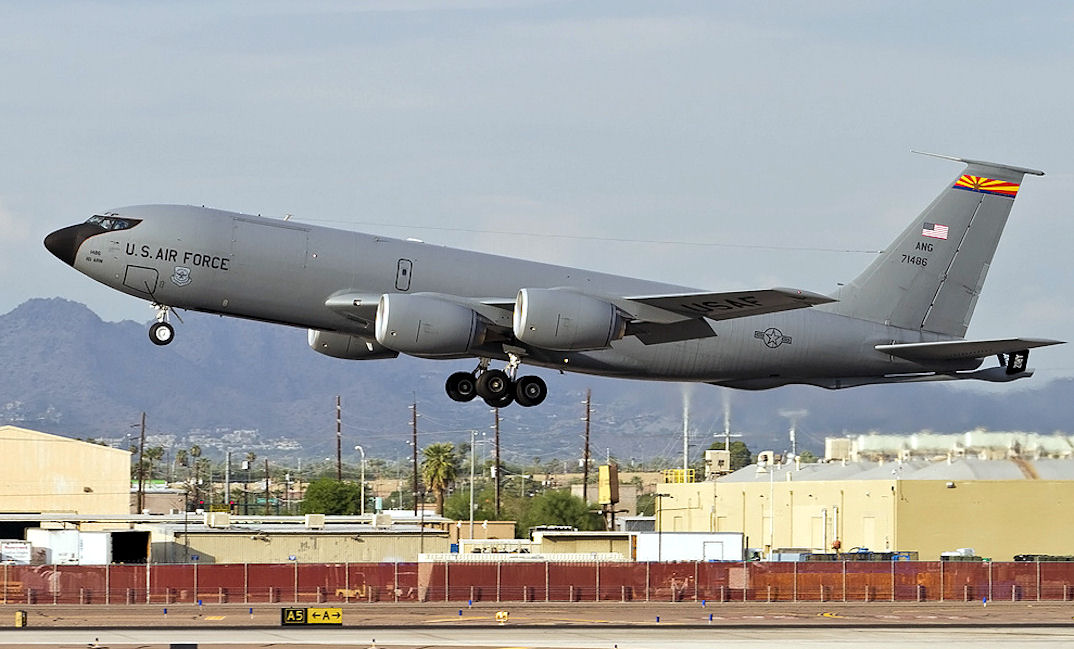
- A KC-135R Stratotanker assigned to the 161st Air Refueling Wing of the Arizona Air National Guard taking off at Goldwater ANGB.

Site information
- Type: Air National Guard Base
- Owner: Department of Defense
- Operator: US Air Force (USAF)
- Controlled by: Arizona Air National Guard (ANG)
- Condition: Operational
- Website: www.161arw.ang.af.mil

Location
- Location in the United States
- Coordinates: 33°25′29.98″N 112°0′45.47″W

Site history
- Built: 1949
- In use: 1949 – present

Garrison information
- Garrison: 161st Air Refueling Wing (host)

Airfield information
- Identifiers: IATA: PHX, ICAO: KPHX, FAA LID: PHX, WMO: 722780
- Elevation: 345.9 metres (1,135 ft) AMSL
Runways
Direction	Length and surface
8/26	3,501.8 metres (11,489 ft) concrete
7L/25R	3,139.4 metres (10,300 ft) concrete
7R/25L	2,377.4 metres (7,800 ft) concrete
- Airfield shared with Phoenix Sky Harbor International Airport. Source: Federal Aviation Administration

Goldwater Air National Guard Base, formerly Sky Harbor Air National Guard Base, is a facility of the United States Air National Guard that exists adjacent to Phoenix Sky Harbor International Airport. It was built as the result of a 99-year lease in 1949, and was rebuilt in the 1990s to accommodate the creation of a third runway at the airport.

On December 9, 2016, the Phoenix Sky Harbor Air National Guard Base was renamed Goldwater Air National Guard Base in honor of former United States Senator from Arizona and former Arizona Air National Guard member Barry Goldwater.

The Arizona Air National Guard's 161st Air Refueling Wing is based at Goldwater Air National Guard Base.
