= Arizona Wing Civil Air Patrol =

Associated branches
- United States Air Force

Command staff
- Commander: Col Linda Yaeger
- Deputy Commander: Lt Col Mark Schadt
- Chief of Staff: Vacant

Current statistics
- Cadets: 782
- Seniors: 701
- Total Membership: 1483
- Awards: 2025 Mission Awards for Homeland Defense/Homeland Security and Aerospace Education
- Website: azwg.cap.gov
- Statistics as of 6 April 2026

Civil Air Patrol's Arizona Wing (AZWG) is one of 52 wings (50 states, Puerto Rico, and National Capital Area) in Civil Air Patrol (the official United States Air Force Auxiliary). Headquartered in Phoenix, Arizona, there are 15 squadrons and one flight listed on the AZWG website.

== Mission ==
Civil Air Patrol's mission/vision statement is: Volunteers serving America's communities, saving lives, and shaping futures.

Arizona Wing members support the three primary programs of Civil Air Patrol: providing emergency services; offering cadet programs for youth; and providing aerospace education for both CAP members and the general public.

== Organization ==
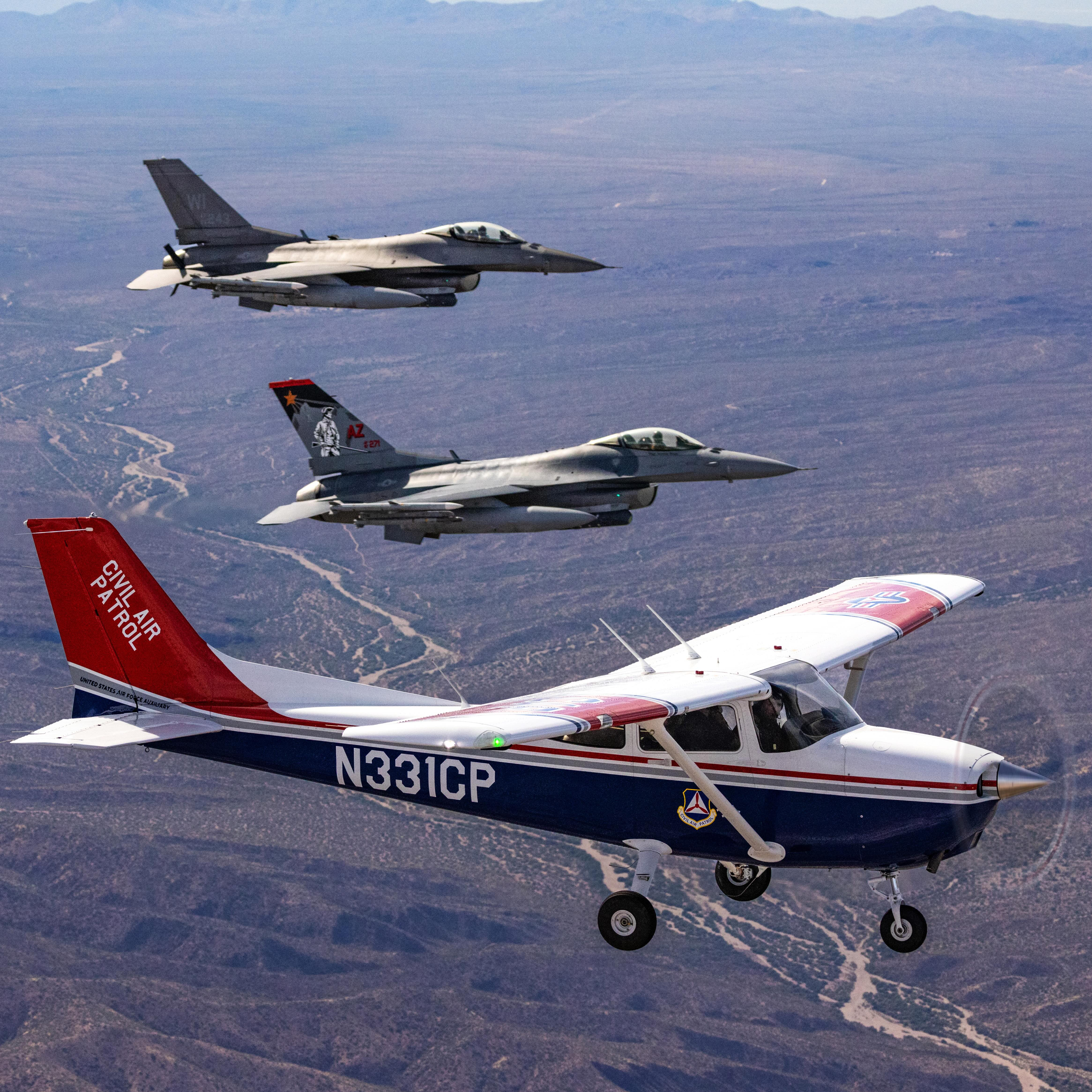
Civil Air Patrol members in Arizona participate in regular training exercises called Felix Hawk with the Air National Guard.

Squadrons of Arizona Wing
Group	Designation	Squadron Name	Location	Notes
South Group	AZ046	Cochise Composite Squadron 107	Sierra Vista	
	AZ106	Neotoma Composite Squadron 109	Tucson	
	AZ334	Davis-Monthan Composite Squadron 334	Davis-Monthan Air Force Base	
	AZ048	William Rogers Memorial Squadron 104	Tucson	
North Group	AZ056	Dan Kenney Composite Squadron 201	Flagstaff	
	AZ102	Payson Senior Flight 209	Payson	
	AZ083	Prescott Composite Squadron 206	Prescott	
	AZ107	Verde Valley Composite Squadron 205	Sedona	
East Group	AZ064	Falcon Composite Squadron 305	Mesa	
	AZ075	Scottsdale Composite Squadron 314	Scottsdale	
	AZ022	Sky Harbor Composite Squadron 301	Phoenix	
	AZ036	Williams Composite Squadron 304	Mesa	
West Group	AZ013	Deer Valley Composite Squadron 302	Phoenix	
	AZ388	388th Composite Squadron	Glendale	
	AZ112	London Bridge Composite Squadron 501	Lake Havasu City	
	AZ021	Yuma Composite Squadron 508	Yuma	

== See also ==
- Arizona Air National Guard
- Awards and decorations of the Civil Air Patrol
