= 161st Air Refueling Wing =

Arizona Air National Guard unit

161st Air Refueling Wing

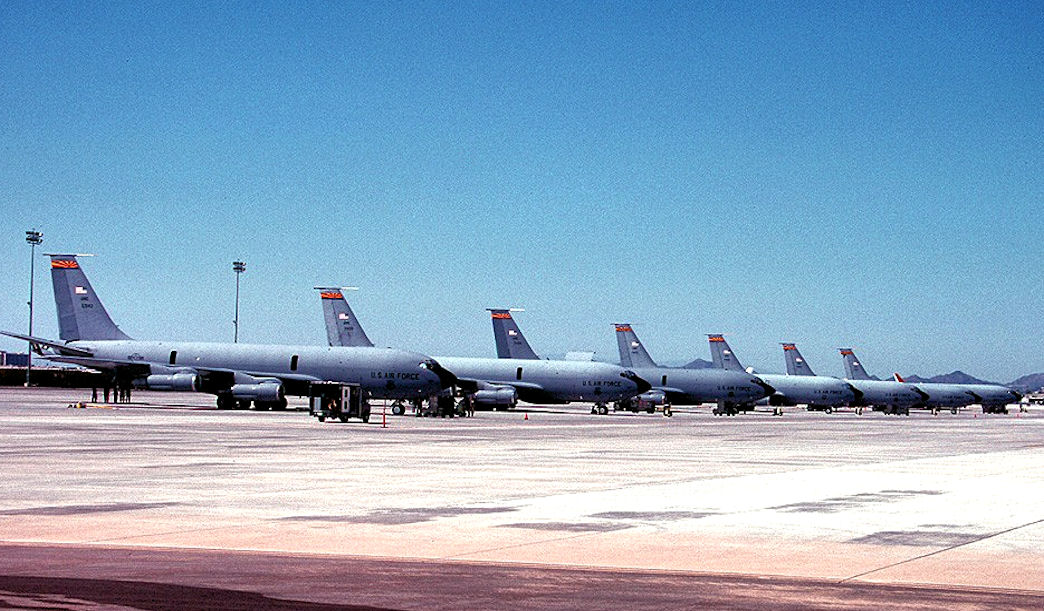
- 161st Air Refueling Wing – KC-135 Stratotankers, Goldwater Air National Guard Base, Phoenix, Arizona
- Active: 1957–1972; 1972–present
- Country: United States
- Allegiance: Arizona
- Branch: Air National Guard
- Type: Wing
- Role: Aerial refueling
- Part of: Arizona Air National Guard
- Garrison/HQ: Goldwater Air National Guard Base, Phoenix, Arizona.
- Nickname: "Copperheads"

Commanders
- Current Commander: Col. Jessica L. Hastings
- Wing Command Chief: Chief Master Sergeant Fred W. Hudgins

Insignia
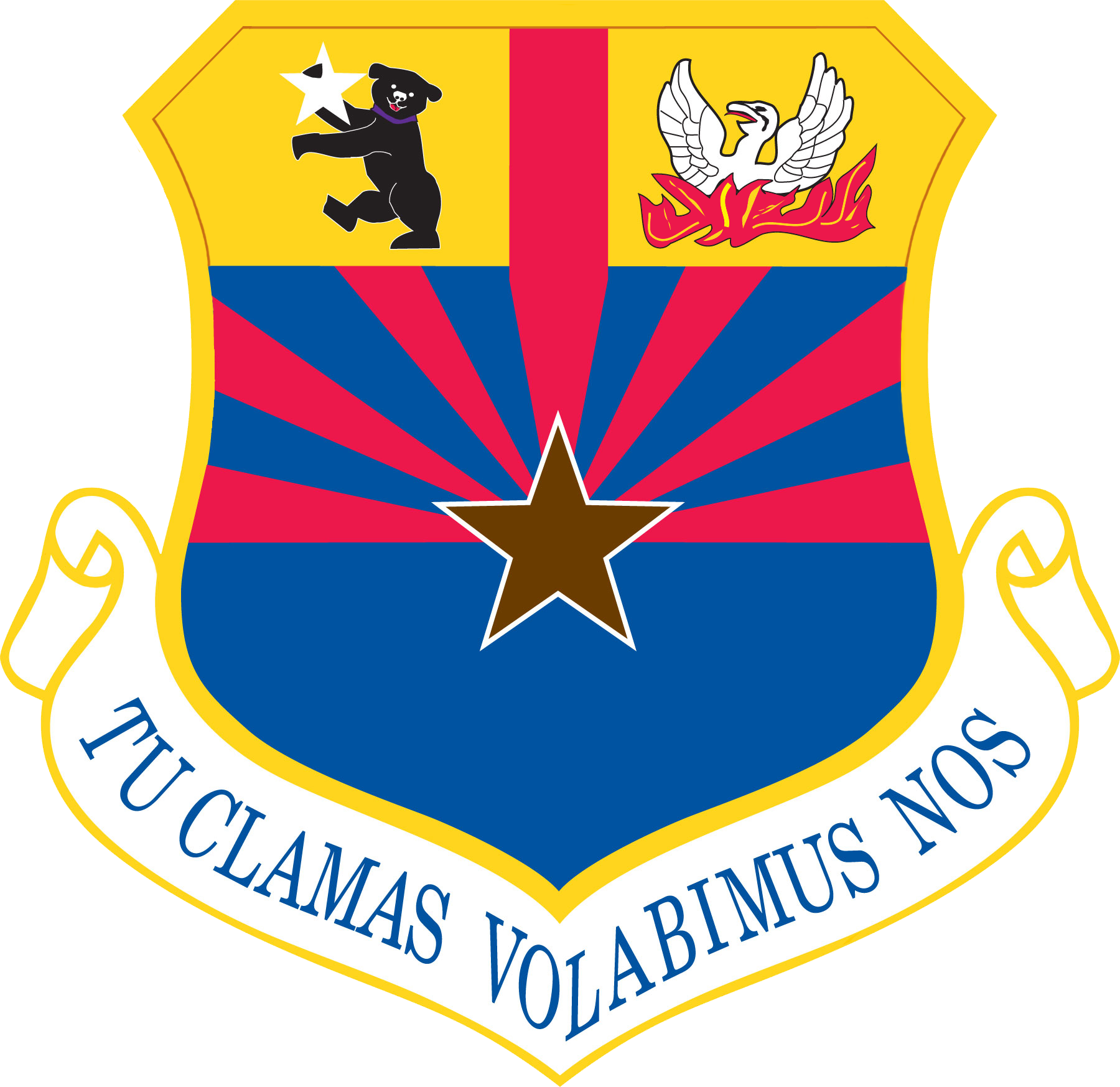
- 161st Air Refueling Wing emblem

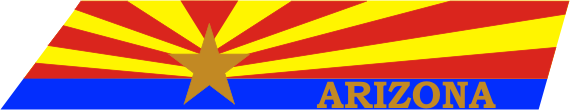
- Tail stripe

Aircraft flown
- Tanker: KC-135 Stratotanker

The 161st Air Refueling Wing is a unit of the Arizona Air National Guard, stationed at Goldwater Air National Guard Base, Arizona. If activated to federal service, the Wing is gained by the United States Air Force Air Mobility Command.

== Mission ==
The 161st Air Refueling Wing principal mission is air refueling. The wing enhances the Air Force's capability to accomplish its primary missions of Global Reach and Global Power. It also provides aerial refueling support to Air Force, Navy and Marine Corps aircraft as well as aircraft of allied nations. The wing is also capable of transporting litter and ambulatory patients using patient support pallets during aeromedical evacuations.

== Units ==
The 161st Air Refueling Wing consists of the following units:

- 161st Operations Group

197th Air Refueling Squadron

- 161st Mission Support Group
- 161st Maintenance Group
- 161st Medical Group

== History ==
On 2 October 1957, the Arizona Air National Guard 197th Fighter-Interceptor Squadron was authorized to expand to a group level, and the 161st Fighter-Interceptor Group was established by the National Guard Bureau. The 197th FIS becoming the group's flying squadron. Other squadrons assigned into the group were the 161st Headquarters, 161st Material Squadron (Maintenance), 161st Combat Support Squadron, and the 161st USAF Dispensary. The new Group was assigned to the 34th Air Division, Air Defense Command. (ADC).

In 1958 the group received from ADC the all-weather/day-night North American F-86L Sabre aircraft, and in 1960, the 197th was one of three selected ANG units to receive Lockheed F-104A Starfighter interceptors from the ADC active-duty interceptor forces. The Copperheads, as a result of the national recognition as one of the best air defense units in the US, were chosen to fly the new high performance jet fighter.

The 161st was called into active service in November 1961 as the construction of the infamous "Berlin Wall" pushed the world to the brink of war. Within a month after mobilization, 750 personnel and 22 187th FIS F-104 aircraft were in place at Ramstein Air Base, West Germany as the unit took up flying daily air defense patrols at the edge of the Iron Curtain. With world tension easing, the squadron returned home in August 1962.

=== Transport mission ===
With the return to Arizona, the unit was reassigned from ADC to the Military Air Transport Service (MATS) in October 1962. The Mach-2 Starfighters were exchanged for large, 4-engined Boeing C-97G Stratofreighters with a mission of worldwide transport of personnel, supplies and equipment. The 197th Air Transport Squadron (later Military Airlift Squadron) flew missions to the Caribbean, Europe, Japan, South Vietnam, Thailand and Australia. During the height of the Vietnam War, the squadron routinely flew trans-Pacific medical evacuation missions from hospitals in South Vietnam, Japan, and the Philippines of wounded servicemen and women to the United States, being designated as an Aeromedical Transport Squadron. In 1969 the Military Airlift Squadron designation was returned and the unit again flew scheduled transport missions for Military Airlift Command (MAC).

=== Air Refueling ===
In 1972, military requirements resulted in a change in mission when the group was reassigned from MAC transport duties to the Strategic Air Command (SAC). Under SAC the group became an Air Refueling unit, beginning with the air refueling version of the C-97 transport, the KC-97 Stratofreighter. Familiarity with the aircraft led to a smooth transition from MAC to the new refueling mission. In 1977, SAC announced that Air National Guard refueling units would begin to upgrade to the KC-135 Stratotanker. The 197th Air Refueling Squadron has been flying the KC-135 for the past 35 years.

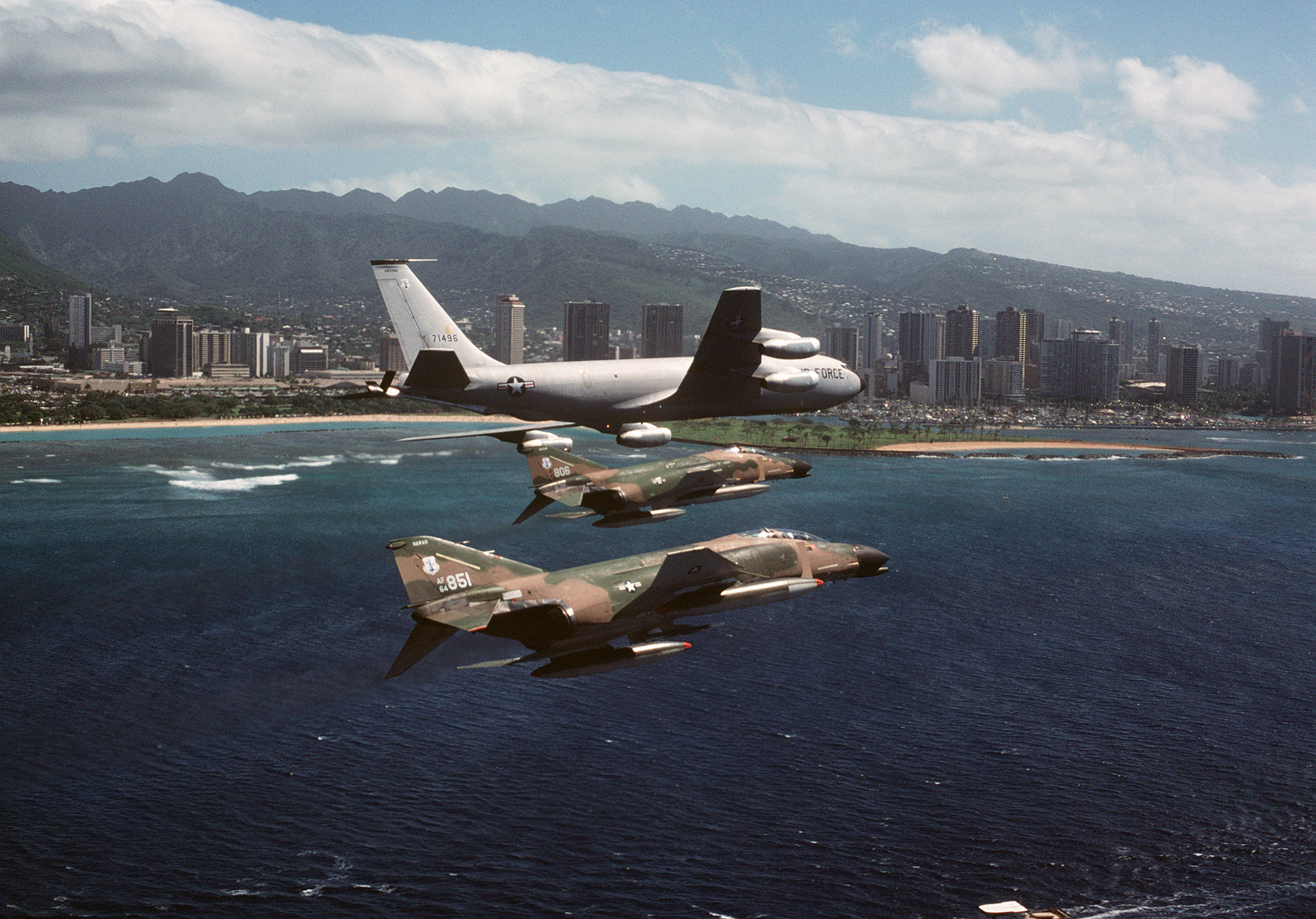
A 161st ARG KC-135A with two Hawaii ANG F-4Cs in 1979

During the 1991 Gulf War, Air National Guard tanker units were quickly called into action. An around-the-clock airlift began to support the buildup to the conflict, Operation Desert Shield. Tankers and crews from the 161st were some of the first to arrive in Saudi Arabia. Elements of the 197th ARS were assigned to the 1709th Air Refueling Wing (Provisional), flying from King Abdul Aziz Air Base, Jeddah, Saudi Arabia.

From the start and for the duration, tankers servicing the conflict left Phoenix weekly, loaded with maintenance and support technicians who worked in the Saudi Arabian desert up to 45 days, and in some cases more. As the allies prepared to move against Iraq, aircraft crews, maintenance personnel, medics, fire fighters, security forces and food service technicians were dispatched to bases in Europe and the United States. Before the war in the Persian Gulf was concluded more than two-thirds of the force assigned to the 161st Air Refueling Group had served on active duty in some capacity to support the Middle East effort.

In 1994, 1995 and 1997 the unit deployed to Pisa, Italy where our tankers supported NATO operations in Bosnia. 1997 also saw the 161st facing challenges in the United Arab Emirates. The unit was vital to the success of Operation Deny Flight and Operation Southern Watch. 1 October 1995, marked another key change in the unit's long history. The 161st Air Refueling Group was redesignated as the 161st Air Refueling Wing under the USAF Air Mobility Command (AMC). 1996 saw the Copperheads turn 50 years old. The unit celebrated with year-round contests and a 50th Anniversary Celebration in December.

The 161st sent about 130 personnel to Operation Northern Watch early in 1999. Based at Incirlik Air Base, Turkey, the unit supported flight operations within the northern no-fly zone over Iraq. Early in the second quarter of 1999, 161st Copperheads were quickly pressed into service over Kosovo for Operation Allied Force. Nearly 200 unit airmen served on active duty for about two months, flying 125 missions to offload almost 2.5 million gallons of fuel. The airmen returned to Phoenix in late June 1999.

Although not directly called as a unit the "Copperheads" played a vital role in support units during Operation Enduring Freedom in 2003. Many Security Forces saw duty overseas directly supporting bases while maintenance and operations personnel were called to support the ongoing operations.

In its 2005 BRAC Recommendations, DoD (the Department of Defense) recommended the distribution of the 117th Air Refueling Wing's KC-135R aircraft from Birmingham International Airport Air Guard Station (AGS), Alabama and the 161st Air Refueling Wing, Phoenix Sky Harbor International Airport AGS (two aircraft) and two other bases. Phoenix Sky Harbor (37) scored higher than Birmingham (63) in military value for the tanker mission. This recommendation would take advantage of available capacity at Phoenix by increasing the air refueling squadron size from eight to ten aircraft, increasing the wing's overall capability. It would also capitalize on the favorable recruiting environment of the greater Phoenix region that could sustain this increased squadron size.

== Lineage ==
161st Military Airlift Group

- Designated as the 161st Fighter Group (Air Defense) and allotted to Arizona ANG in 1957

Extended federal recognition and activated on 2 October 1957
Federalized and placed on active duty on 1 November 1961
Released from active duty and returned to Arizona state control on 15 August 1962
Redesignated 161st Air Transport Group, Heavy on 1 October 1962
Redesignated 161st Military Airlift Group on 1 January 1966
Redesignated 161st Aeromedical Airlift Group on 1 August 1968
Redesignated 161st Military Airlift Group on 16 December 1969
Inactivated on 1 August 1972
Consolidated with the 161st Air Refueling Group

161st Air Refueling Wing

- Established as the 161st Air Refueling Group on 30 May 1972

Activated on 1 August 1972
Redesignated 161st Air Refueling Group, Heavy on 1 October 1977
Consolidated with the 161st Military Airlift Group
Redesignated 161st Air Refueling Group on 16 March 1992
Redesignated 161st Air Refueling Wing on 1 October 1995

=== Assignments ===
- Arizona Air National Guard, 2 October 1957

Gained by: 34th Air Division, Air Defense Command
Gained by: Los Angeles Air Defense Sector, Air Defense Command, 1 July 1960
Gained by: Western Transport Air Force, Military Air Transport Service, 1 October 1962
Gained by: Twenty-Second Air Force, Military Airlift Command, 8 January 1966
Gained by: Strategic Air Command, 1 August 1972
Gained by: Air Combat Command, 1 June 1992
Gained by: Air Mobility Command, 1 June 1993–present

=== Components ===
- 161st Operations Group, 1 October 1995 – present
- 197th Fighter-Interceptor Squadron (later 197th Air Transport Squadron, 197th Military Airlift Squadron, 197th Aeromedical Airlift Squadron, 197th Air Refueling Squadron), 2 October 1957 – 1 August 1972, 1 August 1972 – 1 October 1995

=== Stations ===
- Phoenix Sky Harbor International Airport, Arizona, 1 November 1952
- Langley Air Force Base, Virginia 1 November 1961
- Phoenix Sky Harbor International Airport, Arizona, 15 August 1962

Designated: Goldwater Air National Guard Base, 1991–present

=== Aircraft ===
- F-86A Sabre, 1957–1958
- F-86L Sabre Interceptor, 1958–1960
- F-104A Starfighter, 1960–1962
- C-97G Stratofreighter, 1962–1972
- KC-97L Stratotanker, 1972–1977
- KC-135A Stratotanker, 1977–1982
- KC-135E Stratotanker, 1982–2007
- KC-135R Stratotanker, 2007–Present
