= 162nd Wing =

Arizona Air National Guard unit

162nd Wing

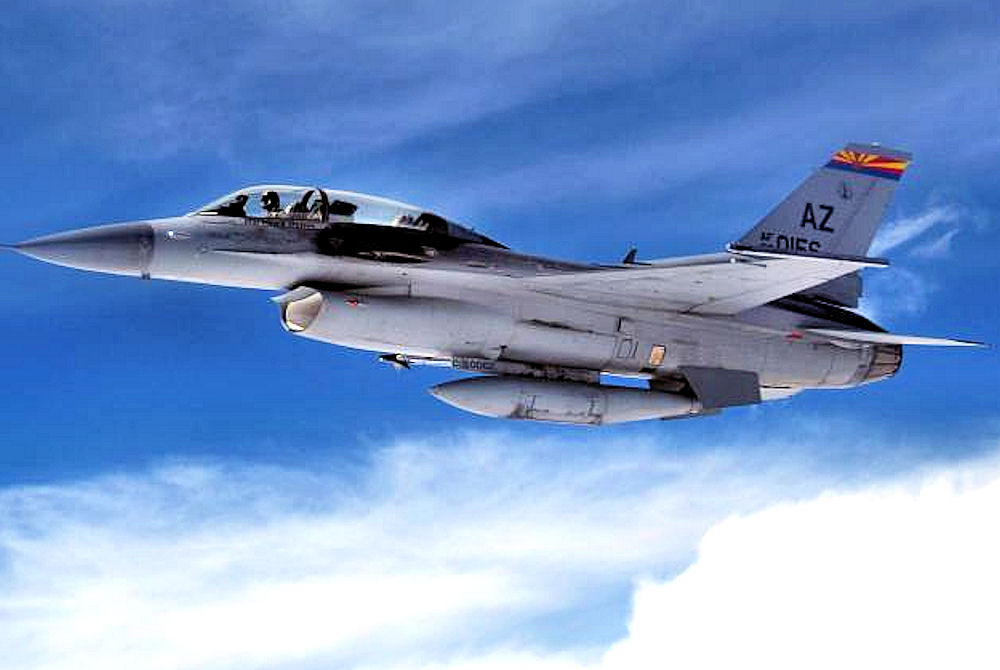
- 152nd Fighter Squadron F-16D Fighting Falcon (Note: Aircraft is General Dynamics F-16D Block 42A Fighting Falcon, serial 88-0156.)
- Active: 1958–1969; 1969–present
- Country: United States
- Allegiance: Arizona
- Branch: Air National Guard
- Type: Wing
- Role: Training
- Part of: Arizona Air National Guard
- Garrison/HQ: Morris Air National Guard Base, Tucson, Arizona

Insignia
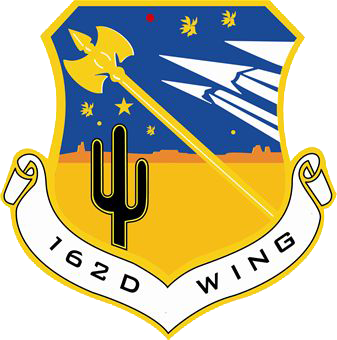
- 162nd Wing emblem

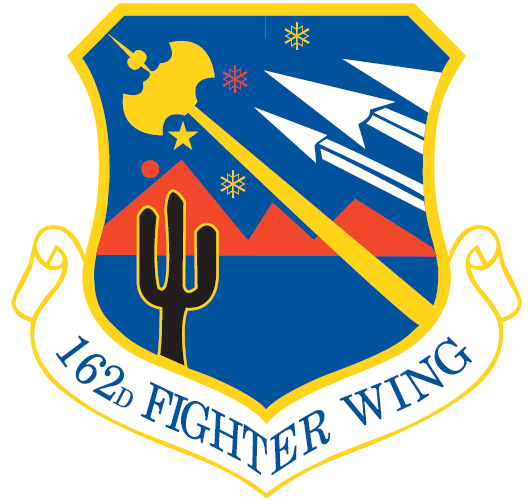
- 162nd Fighter Wing emblem

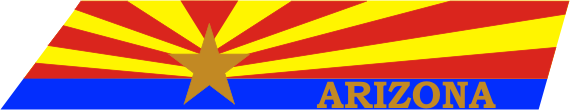
- Tail stripe
- Tail code: AZ

The 162nd Wing is a unit of the Arizona Air National Guard, stationed at Morris Air National Guard Base, Arizona. If activated to federal service, the wing is gained by the United States Air Force Air Combat Command.

== Mission ==
The primary mission of the 162nd Wing is education and flight training of international F-16 Fighting Falcon aircrews. In addition, the wing performs air defense and homeland protection of the United States.

== Units ==
The 162nd consists of the following units:

- 162nd Operations Group

148th Fighter Squadron
152nd Fighter Squadron
195th Fighter Squadron
162nd Training Squadron

- 162nd Maintenance Group
- 162nd Mission Support Group
- 162nd Medical Group
- 214th Attack Group (MQ-9A) (Davis-Monthan Air Force Base & Fort Huachuca)
- 107th Air Control Squadron (Luke Air Force Base)
- Air National Guard Air Force Reserve Command Test Center (F-16C/D Block 25/32)

== History ==
On 1 July 1969, the Arizona Air National Guard 152nd Tactical Fighter Training Squadron was authorized to expand to a group level, and the 162nd Tactical Fighter Training Group was established by the National Guard Bureau. The 152nd TFTS becoming the group's flying squadron. Other squadrons assigned into the group were the 162nd Headquarters, 162nd Material Squadron (Maintenance), 162nd Combat Support Squadron, and the 162nd USAF Dispensary.

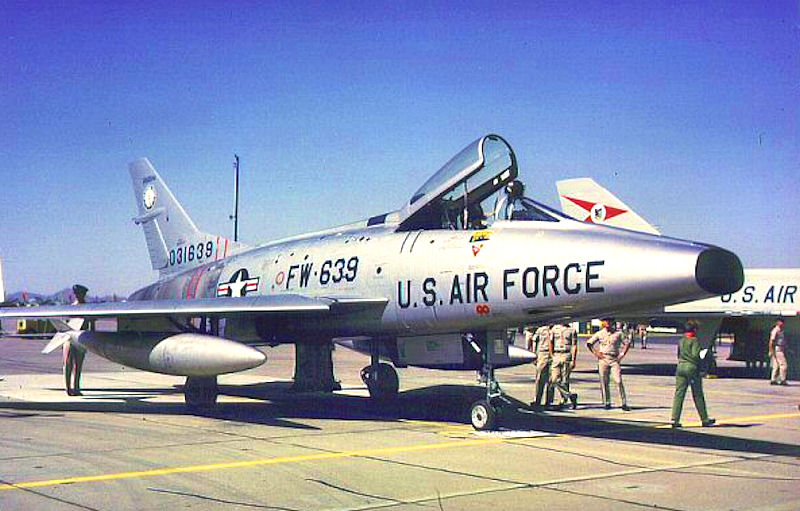
152nd Fighter-Interceptor Squadron – F-100A 53-1639

As part of Tactical Air Command, the 162nd TFTG's mission was producing combat-ready pilots for the F-100 aircraft. The 152nd TFTS equipped with the F-100C Super Sabre, and the group graduated their first students in 1970. Shortly afterward, the unit formed the Air National Guard Fighter Weapons School (FWS) in Tucson. This school taught Air Guard and Reserve fighter pilots from throughout the country to effectively use advanced tactics and weapons technology.

In 1977, the group received A-7D Corsair II ground support aircraft and replaced the F-100s. In the early 1980s the group also received the A-7K, a two-seat combat-capable training aircraft derived from the single-seat A-7D. This was the first time an aircraft manufacturer produced a new aircraft specifically designed for Air National Guard use.

The unit received its second Air Force Outstanding Unit Award for successfully continuing to train F-100 students while completing the most challenging conversion in the unit's history. That tasking was to convert from F-100s to A-7Ds.

In February 1984, a second squadron, the 195th Tactical Fighter Squadron was assigned to the group and additional A-7Ds were assigned. A third A-7D squadron, the 148th Fighter Squadron was assigned in October 1985. These three squadrons shared a common tail code (AZ), and the group's aircraft were formed in a common pool from which all three squadrons used for training.

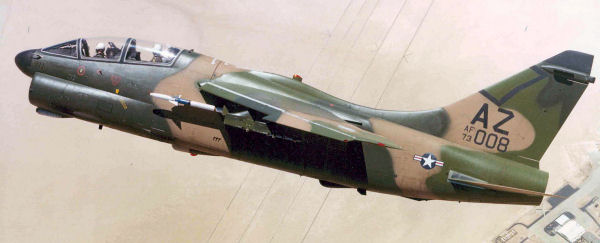
152nd TFS A-7D-15-CV 73-1008 modified to the twin-seat A-7K configuration.

During the 1980s the unit received its fourth Air Force Outstanding Unit Award and the Spaatz Trophy. The Spaatz Trophy recognized the 162nd Fighter Wing as the outstanding Air National Guard unit in the United States.

In 1985, the unit began a dual training mission using a mixture of F-16 Fighting Falcon and its A-7 aircraft. With the A-7s being retired from the inventory, conversion from the A-7D/K started in 1986 when the group started to receive older F-16A aircraft from other USAF units.

The mission of the unit was to train combat-ready pilots for the Air National Guard (Replacement Training Unit or RTU), but the older F-16A Block 5 airframes were not quite suited to fulfill this mission. Therefore, a number of more modern F-16A block 15 airframes were introduced in the squadron after 1989 to be able to maintain a more modern training syllabus. The last of the A-7Ds were retired in 1992.

In 1987, the group was awarded the Sistema de Cooperacion Entre Las Fuerzas Aereas Americanas (SICOFAA), the Safety Award of the Americas. In 1989 the Netherlands and the United States formally agreed to use the 162nd Fighter Group's first-rate facilities and people to train Dutch fighter pilots in the F-16 aircraft. In 1990 the unit received its fifth Air Force Outstanding Unit Award. Midsummer 1991 saw the retirement of all its A-7D aircraft. Now the unit flies the F-16A/B/C/D and the newer F-16E/F Fighting Falcon aircraft plus a single C-26A Metroliner light transport aircraft.

=== International training unit ===
In 1992 the status of the 162nd was upgraded from group to wing, and the ANG staff decided to modernize the training that the squadron was providing to ANG crews as well as regular USAF units or NATO F-16 pilots. Therefore, more modern F-16C block 42 airframes were delivered to the group. This opened a lot of opportunities. Beginning in April of that year, the 162nd began training fighter pilots for the Republic of Singapore, followed in 1993 by Bahrain, by Portugal in 1994, and by Thailand, Indonesia and Turkey in 1995. The unit was designated a wing in October 1995 and the international training mission continued to expand, adding Belgium in 1996 followed by Jordan and Norway in the first half of 1997. Denmark began training with the 162nd in June 1998, and Japan began training in late 1998. Italy sent their first pilot to Tucson in October 2000, Greece began training with the wing in January 2001 and the United Arab Emirates sent their first students in August 2001. Oman and Poland both began sending students in 2004. Other nations who have trained or are currently training in Tucson are Israel, Italy, Chile and Taiwan. Additional nations are currently negotiating training programs with the 162nd FW.

In addition to the training done at the ANG base in Tucson, the wing conducts training at individual client nations. Mobile Training Teams have conducted classes in numerous countries around the world, most recently in Turkey, the Netherlands, Thailand and Poland. The Thailand Mobile Training Team conducted the unit's premier international training course, known as the Advanced Weapons Course. This program provides "graduate-level" training to assist allied nations in meeting their need for highly trained F-16 pilots.

On 9 June 1997, the wing embarked on a new mission, training international maintenance technicians on F-16 systems. Jordan sent the first six of nearly 60 technicians to observe and learn 162nd Fighter Wing maintenance techniques so they can emulate what they learn here at their home stations. The training they receive here supplements the technical training they received from the aircraft manufacturer. Italy and the United Arab Emirates have also sent their technicians to Tucson for maintenance training.

From October 1998 until August 1999, the unit conducted a program to convert three former air defense units to the general-purpose role. This air-to-ground training program taught current F-16 air defense pilots how to employ the F-16 in the ground attack mission. Air defense units from the Vermont, New Jersey, Texas and California Air National Guards transferred eight F-16C/Ds to the 162nd FW. These aircraft were used to train nearly 60 pilots from the three air defense units. Maintenance people from these states also provided maintenance support for these aircraft under 162nd Maintenance Group supervision.

=== Global War on Terrorism ===
The September 11, 2001, terrorist attacks on the United States brought immediate change to the 162nd Fighter Wing. Within hours of the first attack on the World Trade Center and the Pentagon, the 162nd FW placed F-16 aircraft on alert. In the days and weeks that followed, the wing met every requirement of this new air defense mission, dubbed Operation Noble Eagle, with outstanding results. Many members of the wing volunteered to support this new mission and others have stepped up and answered the president's call to "mobilize" in support of this critical mission.

The unit received its sixth Air Force Outstanding Unit Award in 2003 for mobilizing more than 300 personnel to support the North American Air Defense Command's Operation Noble Eagle, providing more than 50 personnel to support Central Command's Operation Enduring Freedom, for supporting Joint Forge, Coronet Oak, Coronet Nighthawk and providing personnel to Southern Command and European Command.

=== Current status ===
On 27 June 2004, the 162nd Fighter Wing and the United Arab Emirates initiated a unique training program. The UAE F-16 Training Program is a dedicated F-16 squadron, the 148th Fighter Squadron. The squadron will operate in the long-term with 13 F-16E/F (Block 60) aircraft. The first aircraft arrived on 2 September 2004.

Along with the homeland defense mission, the 162nd FW continues its primary mission of international F-16 pilot training. The 162nd Fighter Wing now features new modern buildings, up-to-date equipment .

The Iraqi government purchased 36 F-16 Fighting Falcons to help rebuild their air force. However, the security situation in Iraq made delivering the aircraft impractical. The decision was made to instead deliver eight of the fighters to Tucson and continue the Iraqi Air Force pilots' training there. The Arizona ANG's 162nd Wing was chosen to provide the training due to its already established experience with foreign students. The wing is home to pilots in training from many nations, including the Netherlands, Norway, Singapore and Japan. All the Iraqi pilots have gone through U.S. pilot training and then move to Arizona for their F-16 training. The first two Iraqi air force F-16D were delivered on 16 December 2014.

On 1 April 2014, the unit was redesignated as the 162nd Wing, to reflect the inclusion of the 214th Reconnaissance Group into the wing.

== Lineage ==
162nd Fighter Group

- Established as the 162nd Fighter Group (Air Defense) and allotted to the Air National Guard in 1958

Activated on 25 May 1958 and extended federal recognition
Inactivated on 16 September 1959
Consolidated with the 162nd Tactical Fighter Group on 18 August 1987

162nd Wing
Established as the 162nd Tactical Fighter Training Group in 1969
Activated on 16 September 1969
Redesignated 162nd Tactical Fighter Group on 26 July 1979
Consolidated with the 162nd Fighter Group (Air Defense) on 18 August 1987
Redesignated 162nd Fighter Group on 16 March 1992
Redesignated 162nd Fighter Wing on 16 October 1995
Redesignated 162nd Wing on 1 April 2014

=== Assignments ===
- 144th Air Defense Wing, 25 May 1958
- Arizona Air National Guard, 16 September 1969 – present

==== Gaining Commands ====
Air Defense Command, 25 May 1958
Tactical Air Command, 16 September 1969
Air Combat Command, 1 June 1992
Air Education and Training Command, 1 July 1993 – present

=== Components ===
- 162nd Operations Group, 16 March 1992 – present
- 214th Reconnaissance Group (later, 214th Attack Group), 1 April 2014 – present
- 148th Tactical Fighter Training Squadron (later 148th Fighter Squadron), 15 October 1985 – 1 June 1992
- 152nd Fighter-Interceptor Squadron (later 152nd Tactical Fighter Training Squadron, 152nd Fighter Squadron)25 May 1958 – 16 September 1969, 16 September 1969 – 1 June 1992
- 195th Tactical Fighter Training Squadron (later 195th Fighter Squadron), 1 February 1984 – 1 June 1992
- Air National Guard Air Force Reserve Command Test Center, 1990–present

=== Stations ===
- Tucson International Airport, 25 May 1958 – 16 September 1969
- Tucson International Airport (later Tucson Air National Guard Base, 16 September 1969 – present

Aircraft flown through the years:

- 1956–1957: F-86A Sabre
- 1957–1958: F-84F Thunderstreak
- 1958–1966: F-100A Super Sabre
- 1966–1969: F-102A Delta Dagger
- 1969–1976: F-100CD Super Sabre
- 1975–1987: A-7D/K Corsair II
- 1985–Present: F-16A/C/CG/CJ/E Fighting Falcon
