= Tucson International Airport =

Airport in Tucson, Arizona, United States

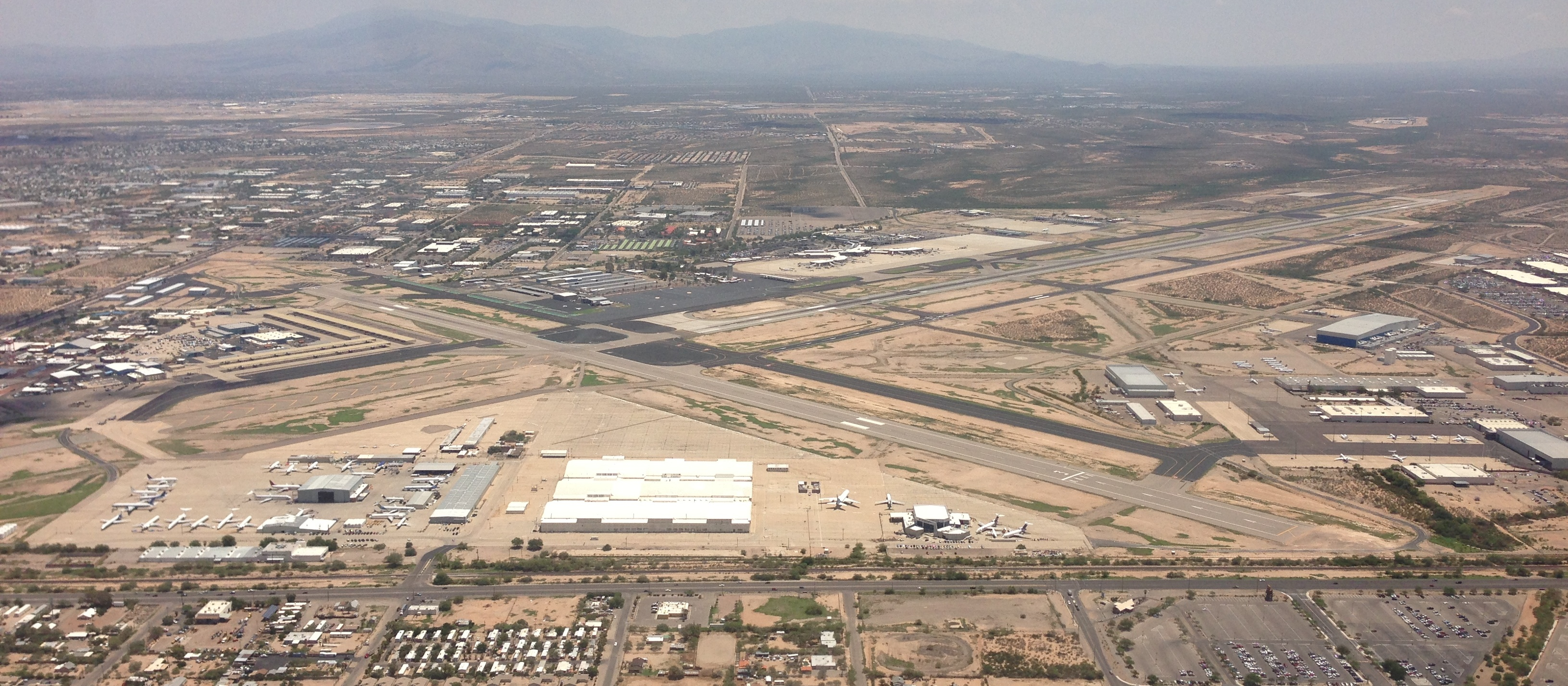
- IATA: TUS; ICAO: KTUS; FAA LID: TUS

Summary
- Airport type: Public
- Owner: City of Tucson
- Operator: Tucson Airport Authority
- Serves: Tucson, Arizona
- Elevation AMSL: 2,643 ft (806 m)
- Coordinates: 32°06′58″N 110°56′28″W
- Website: www.flytucson.com

Maps
- FAA diagram (June 2009)
- Interactive map of Tucson International Airport

Runways
Direction	Length		Surface
Direction	ft	m	Surface
12/30	10,996	3,352	Asphalt
4/22	7,000	2,134	Asphalt

Statistics (2025 Fiscal Year)
- Aircraft operations: 126,534
- Total passengers: 3,919,007
- Source: Federal Aviation Administration; Statistics: Tucson Airport Authority

Tucson International Airport (IATA: TUS, ICAO: KTUS, FAA LID: TUS) is a civil-military airport owned by the city of Tucson 8 miles (7.0 nmi; 13 km) south of downtown Tucson, in Pima County, Arizona, United States. It is the second busiest airport in Arizona, after Phoenix Sky Harbor International Airport.

The National Plan of Integrated Airport Systems for 2025–2029 categorized it as a primary commercial service airport since it has over 10,000 passenger boardings per year and as a small hub since it receives between 0.05% and 0.25% of annual U.S. commercial enplanements (0.2% of 2023 U.S. commercial enplanements to be more precise). Federal Aviation Administration records say the airport had 1,959,789 enplanements in 2024, an increase from 1,925,546 in 2023.

Tucson International is operated on a long-term lease by the Tucson Airport Authority, which also operates Ryan Airfield, a general aviation airport. Public transportation to the airport is Sun Tran bus routes No. 11 and No. 25.

== History ==
In 1919, Tucson opened the first municipally owned airport in the United States. In 1928 commercial flights began with Standard Airlines (later American Airlines); regular airmail service began in 1930. The 1936 airport directory shows Tucson Municipal at 32°11′N 110°55′W "just north of the railroad" (since removed) referring to the site that was then being used as the city's airport southeast of the intersection of S. Park Avenue and E. 36th Street.

During World War II the airfield was used by the United States Army Air Forces Air Technical Service Command. A contract flying school was operated by the USAAF West Coast Training Center from July 25, 1942, until September 1944.

In 1948, the Tucson Airport Authority was created as a non-profit corporation to operate the airport and oversee policy decisions. The nine member board is elected by a group of up to 115 volunteer residents from Pima County, Arizona. The airport was moved to its current location south of Valencia Road and operated on the west ramp out of three hangars vacated by World War II military manufacturing companies. A new control tower was constructed in 1958 to replace the original WWII wooden framed version.

The Tucson Airport Authority was also involved in bringing the Hughes Missile Plant, now known as Air Force Plant 44 and operated by Raytheon, to Tucson. TAA sold the land to the Hughes Aircraft Co., for the construction of the plant.

In March 1956, the Civil Aeronautics Board approved routes out of Tucson for Trans World Airlines (TWA), over opposition from American Airlines, but flights did not begin until December of that year.

In April 1957, airlines scheduled 21 departures a day: 15 American, 4 TWA, and 2 Frontier. The first jet flights were American Airlines Boeing 707s and Boeing 720s around September 1960. American began flying wide-body McDonnell Douglas DC-10s from Tucson nonstop to Dallas/Ft. Worth and to Chicago via Phoenix beginning in fall 1971 and continuing through the 1970s. In 1981, Eastern Airlines was operating direct Airbus A300 wide-body service to Atlanta via an en-route stop in Phoenix. In the late 1980s American was flying Boeing 767-200s nonstop to Dallas/Ft. Worth. The DC-10, A300, and 767 were the largest airliners ever to serve Tucson on scheduled passenger flights.

On November 15, 1963, a new terminal designed by Terry Atkinson opened with an international inspection station. The Tucson International Airport name was legitimate: Aeronaves de Mexico had begun Douglas DC-6 service to Hermosillo and beyond in 1961. In the mid-1970s successor airline Aeromexico flew McDonnell Douglas DC-9-30s nonstop to Hermosillo and on to Ciudad Obregon, Culiacan, Guadalajara and Mexico City. Bonanza Air Lines began DC-9 jet service to Mexico in the late 1960s with flights to Mazatlan, La Paz and Puerto Vallarta, and successor airlines Air West and Hughes Airwest flew DC-9s from Tucson to Mexico with their service being extended to Guadalajara, Mazatlan, La Paz and Puerto Vallarta. By late 1989, three Mexican air carriers were serving the airport: Aero California with nonstop Douglas DC-9-10 jet service from Los Cabos, Aeromexico with nonstop McDonnell Douglas DC-9-30 jet service from both Guaymas and Hermosillo, and Aviacion del Noroeste with nonstop Fokker F27 turboprop service from Hermosillo.

The terminal underwent minor remodeling during the 1960s and 1970s, and its interior was featured in the 1974 film Death Wish starring Charles Bronson.

From the early 1970s to the early 1980s Cochise Airlines was based in Tucson. This commuter airline operated Cessna 402s, Convair 440s, de Havilland Canada DHC-6 Twin Otters and Swearingen Metroliners. Cochise scheduled passenger flights to cities in Arizona and southern California.

A remodeling in 1985 doubled the size of the terminal from 150,000 to 300,000 sq ft and rebuilt the concourse into separate, two-level structures with jet bridges.

In 1987 the airport lengthened the primary runway a half-mile to the southeast for noise abatement reasons and installed arresting barriers for military planes.

A Concourse Renovation Project was finished in 2005—the last phase of a remodeling begun in 2000 that added 82,000 sq ft (7,600 m^{2}) to ticketing and baggage claim designed by HNTB. On March 19, 2008, the previous East and West concourses and gates were renumbered with the East Concourse becoming Concourse A: Gates A1–A9, and the West Concourse becoming Concourse B: Gates B1–B11.

In 2019, the Tucson Airport became the third facility in Arizona with an ATP Flight School training center.

In January 2014, the Tucson Airport Authority board approved a no-cost, 20-year property lease with the Federal Aviation Administration for a property on which to build a new federally-funded control tower to replace the 1950s vintage tower currently in use. The new tower is located on the south side of the airport, near Aero Park Blvd.

On April 6, 2016, the Tucson Airport Authority announced the Terminal Optimization Program (TOP). The program (campaign name, A Brighter TUS) includes a variety of terminal improvements, including relocation and improved capacity at the Security Screening Checkpoints, enhanced concession and revenue opportunities, upgrade of building systems, and maximizing use of space. Renovation began in June 2016 and was completed in November 2017.

Effective November 30, 2023, the airport closed runway 11R/29L permanently and began construction of a new south parallel runway and center taxiway. The project will take about 2 years to complete and open sometime in 2026. Runway 11L/29R was renumbered 12/30 and the crosswind runway 3/21 was renumbered 4/22. When completed, the new parallel runway will be designated 12R/30L and 12/30 will be designated 12L/30R.

== Military use ==
Tucson International Airport hosts Morris Air National Guard Base, known as Tucson Air National Guard Base prior to November 2018, a 92-acre (37 ha) complex on the northwest corner of the airport that is home to the 162nd Wing (162 WG), an Air Education and Training Command (AETC)-gained unit of the Arizona Air National Guard. Military use of Tucson Airport began in 1956, when the Arizona Air National Guard activated the 152d Fighter Interceptor Squadron, an Air Defense Command (ADC)-gained unit, which operated Korean War vintage F-86A Sabres. At that time the "base" consisted of an old adobe farmhouse and a dirt-floor hangar with enough space for three aircraft. During its history at TUS, the wing has operated the F-86 Sabre, F-100 Super Sabre, F-102 Delta Dagger, A-7 Corsair II and General Dynamics F-16 Fighting Falcon aircraft.

Today the 162nd Wing is the largest Air National Guard fighter unit in the United States, and operates over 70 F-16C/D/E/F aircraft in three squadrons. The wing's F-16s augment the active Air Force's 56th Fighter Wing (56 FW) at Luke AFB, Arizona as a Formal Training Unit (FTU) for training Regular Air Force, Air Force Reserve Command, Air National Guard and NATO and allies' F-16 pilots.

The wing also hosts the Air National Guard / Air Force Reserve Command (ANG AFRC) Command Test Center (AATC) as a tenant unit, which conducts operational testing on behalf of the Air Reserve Component. The 162 WG also hosts "Snowbird" operations during the winter months for Air Force, Air Force Reserve Command, and Air National Guard F-16 and Fairchild Republic A-10 Thunderbolt II units from northern tier bases in the continental United States, as well as Canadian Forces and Royal Air Force flying units.

Not counting students or transient flight crews, the installation employs over 1,700 personnel, over 1,100 of whom are full-time Active Guard and Reserve (AGR) and Air Reserve Technician (ART) personnel, and the remainder traditional part-time Air National Guardsmen. Although an AETC organization, the 162nd also maintains an F-16 Alert Detachment for U.S. Northern Command / NORAD and AFNORTH at nearby Davis-Monthan AFB in support of Operation Noble Eagle.

== Facilities ==
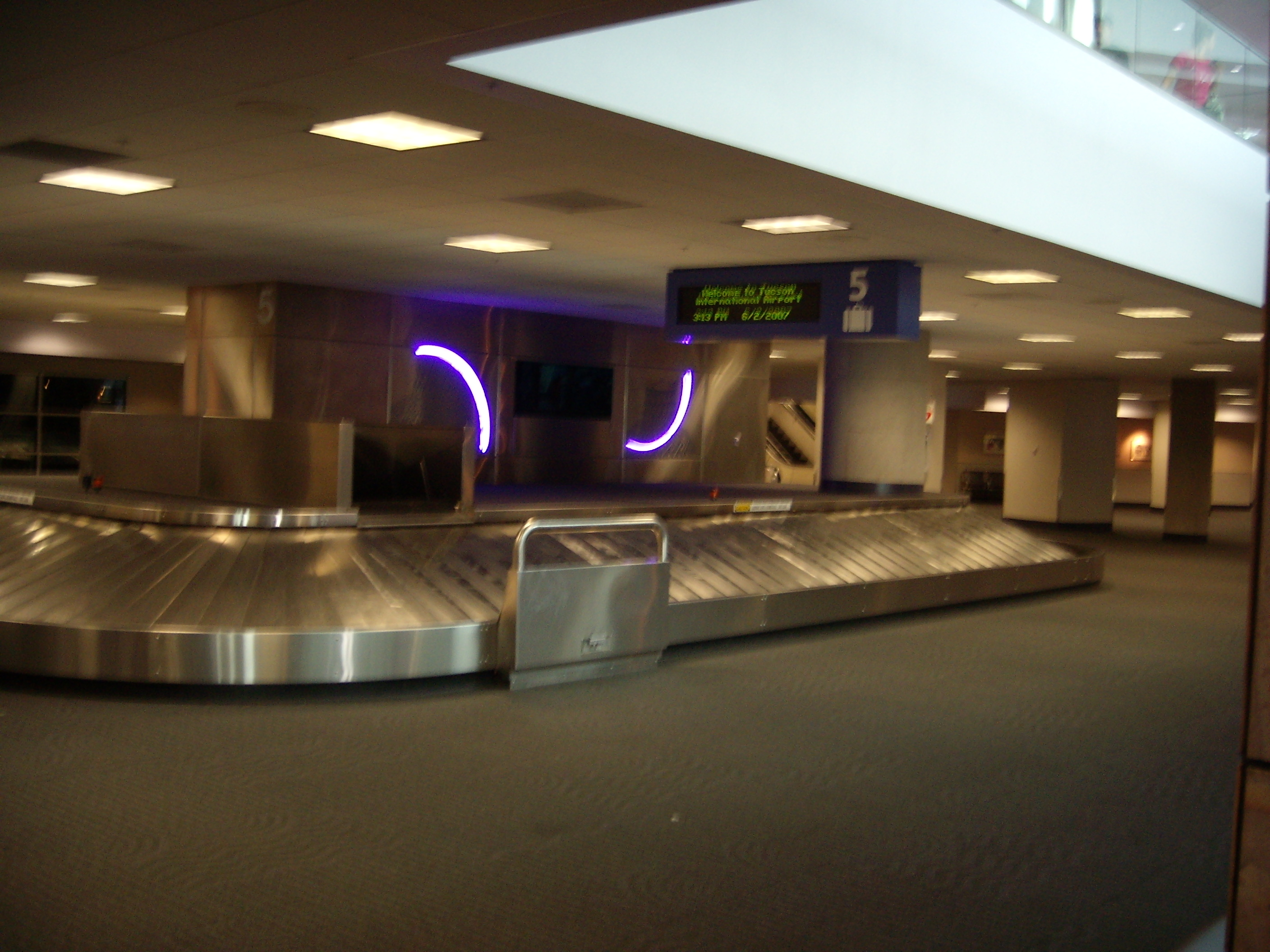
Baggage claim area; Belt 5 is used by Southwest Airlines exclusively.

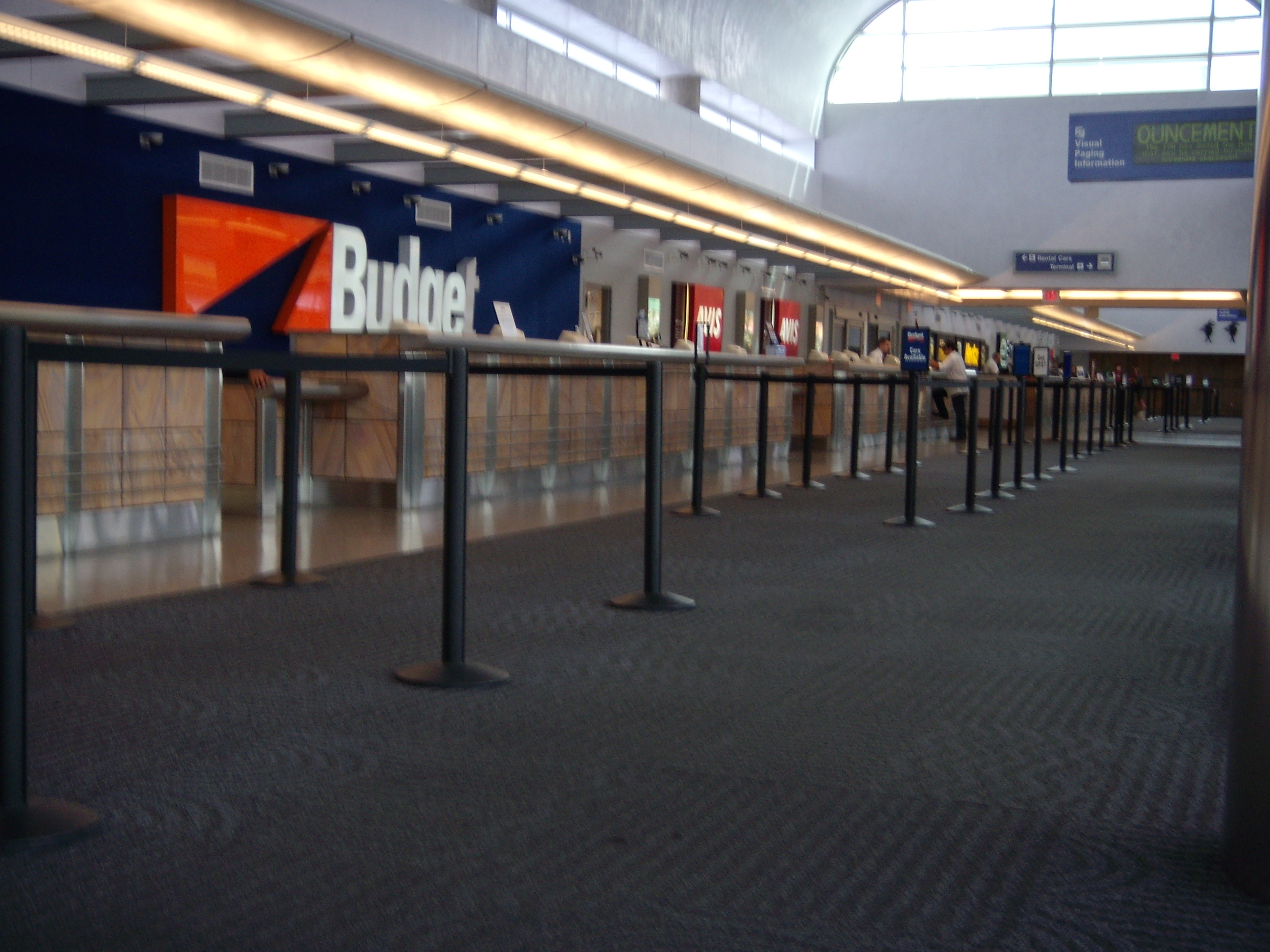
Rental car complex (north to south end)

The airport covers 7,938 acres (3,212 ha) at an elevation of 2,643 ft (806 m). It has two asphalt runways:

- Runway 12/30: 10,996 ft × 150 ft (3,352 m × 46 m), with ILS
- Runway 4/22: 7,000 ft × 150 ft (2,134 m × 46 m)
- Runway 11R/29L: 8,408 ft × 75 ft (2,563 m × 23 m) (closed permanently)

=== Terminal ===
Tucson International Airport has one terminal. It contains three concourses: Concourse A has nine gates, A1 through A9, Concourse B has eleven gates, B1 through B11. Concourse C is in a separate building west of the main terminal and has one gate, C1. There are three levels inside the main terminal. The ground level is designated for baggage claim and passenger pick-up. The upper level includes airline ticketing, concessions, airline gates and TSA. The third level is designated for meetings and conference rooms and also includes the Tucson Airport Authority offices. Currently, Tucson International Airport offers daily nonstop airline service to 23 destination airports across the U.S. and Canada. Additionally, there are one-stop connections to more than 400 destinations around the world. Tucson International Airport's terminal is similar to that of the terminal of Seattle–Tacoma International Airport, with both in the shape of a wide X.

Both concourses inside the main terminal offer food, beverage, and shopping, and free wireless internet and charging stations.

== Airlines and destinations ==
=== Passenger ===
Airlines	Destinations
Alaska Airlines	Portland (OR), Seattle/Tacoma; Seasonal: Orange County
American Airlines	Chicago–O'Hare, Dallas/Fort Worth; Seasonal: Phoenix–Sky Harbor
American Eagle	Los Angeles, Phoenix–Sky Harbor
Delta Air Lines	Atlanta; Seasonal: Minneapolis/St. Paul, Seattle/Tacoma
Delta Connection	Los Angeles, Salt Lake City; Seasonal: Seattle/Tacoma
Southwest Airlines	Denver, Las Vegas, Los Angeles, Phoenix–Sky Harbor, San Diego; Seasonal: Chicago–Midway, Dallas–Love, Houston–Hobby
Sun Country Airlines	Seasonal: Minneapolis/St. Paul
United Airlines	Denver; Seasonal: Chicago–O'Hare, Houston–Intercontinental
United Express	Chicago–O'Hare, Denver, Houston–Intercontinental, San Francisco

== Statistics ==
=== Top destinations ===
Busiest domestic routes from TUS (February 2025 – January 2026)
Rank	City	Passengers	Carriers
1	Dallas/Fort Worth, Texas	320,530	American, Frontier
2	Denver, Colorado	297,990	Frontier, Southwest, United
3	Phoenix–Sky Harbor, Arizona	189,950	American, Southwest
4	Los Angeles, California	149,790	American, Delta, Southwest
5	Las Vegas, Nevada	148,210	Frontier, Southwest
6	Atlanta, Georgia	121,860	Delta
7	Seattle/Tacoma, Washington	115,180	Alaska, Delta
8	Chicago–O'Hare, Illinois	111,960	American, United
9	Salt Lake City, Utah	66,440	Delta, Frontier
10	San Francisco, California	64,130	United

=== Airline market share ===
Largest airlines at TUS (February 2025 – January 2026)
Rank	Airline	Passengers	Share
1	Southwest Airlines	990,000	26.35%
2	Skywest Airlines	950,000	25.28%
3	American Airlines	842,000	22.41%
4	Delta Air Lines	318,000	8.47%
5	United Airlines	289,000	7.69%
6	Others	368,000	9.79%

=== Annual traffic ===
Traffic by fiscal year at TUS, 2008-present
Fiscal year	Passenger volume	Change over previous year	Aircraft operations	Freight (lbs)
2008	4,395,205			
2009	3,669,924	▼16.50%		
2010	3,709,178	▲1.07%		
2011	3,676,894	▼0.87%		
2012	3,649,783	▼0.74%	145,164	71,431,830
2013	3,308,620	▼9.35%	138,263	68,359,820
2014	3,239,849	▼2.08%	139,420	64,796,533
2015	3,181,901	▼1.79%	141,422	66,184,562
2016	3,228,389	▲1.46%	139,555	61,837,690
2017	3,413,451	▲5.73%	132,867	57,718,854
2018	3,551,159	▲4.03%	133,764	64,975,135
2019	3,783,535	▲6.54%	130,076	64,655,515
2020	2,283,777	▼39.63%	123,783	65,266,408
2021	2,257,581	▼1.14%	130,076	64,655,515
2022	3,317,494	▲46.95%	137,373	67,089,271
2023	3,751,557	▲13.08%	150,309	61,929,774
2024	3,873,141	▲6.02%	121,782	57,675,271
2025	3,919,007	▲1.18%	126,534	36,064,759

== Accidents and incidents ==
- On June 3, 1977, Continental Airlines Flight 63, a Boeing 727-224 Advanced, struck powerlines and two utility poles after takeoff due to a windshear encounter. The aircraft returned safely to TUS with no injuries to passengers or crew. The plane was substantially damaged but was repaired and placed back into service.
- On December 30, 1989, an America West Boeing 737-204 (Flight 450, Registration N198AW) was en route to the Tucson International Airport when a fire in the wheel well burned through hydraulic cabling. During landing braking was ineffective and the aircraft overran the end of the runway. After colliding with a concrete structure the plane came to a stop. The aircraft was written off.
- On January 23, 2017, a Beechcraft 300 crashed near a parking structure shortly after takeoff, killing the two people on board.

== Bibliography ==
- This article incorporates public domain material from the Air Force Historical Research Agency
- Manning, Thomas A. (2005). History of Air Education and Training Command, 1942–2002. Randolph AFB, Texas: Office of History and Research, Headquarters, AETC. OCLC 71006954.
- Shaw, Frederick J. (2004). Locating Air Force Base Sites, History's Legacy. Washington, DC: Air Force History and Museums Program, United States Air Force. OCLC 57007862.
