= Arizona Air National Guard =

- Emblem of the Arizona Air National Guard
- Active: 12 December 1946 – present
- Country: United States
- Allegiance: Arizona
- Branch: Air National Guard
- Type: State militia, reserve force
- Role: "To meet state and federal mission responsibilities."
- Part of: Arizona National Guard; United States National Guard Bureau; National Guard
- Garrison/HQ: Joint Force Headquarters, 5636 E McDowell Road, Phoenix

Commanders
- Civilian leadership: President Donald Trump (Commander-in-Chief); Troy Meink (Secretary of the Air Force); Governor Katie Hobbs (Governor of the State of Arizona)
- State military leadership: Major General Kerry L. Muehlenbeck

Aircraft flown
- Fighter: F-16 Fighting Falcon
- Reconnaissance: MQ-9 Reaper
- Tanker: KC-135 Stratotanker

The Arizona Air National Guard (AZ ANG) is the aerial militia of the state of Arizona, United States of America. It is, along with the Arizona Army National Guard, an element of the Arizona National Guard.

As state militia units, the units in the Arizona Air National Guard are not typically in the normal United States Air Force chain of command unless federalized. They are under the jurisdiction of the governor of Arizona through the office of the Arizona Adjutant General unless they are federalized when ordered by the president of the United States. The Arizona Air National Guard is headquartered at the Joint Force Headquarters in Phoenix and at Phoenix Sky Harbor Airport, and its commander is currently Major General Kerry L. Muehlenbeck.

== Overview ==
Under the "Total Force" concept, Arizona Air National Guard units are an Air Reserve Components (ARC) of the United States Air Force (USAF). Arizona ANG units are trained and equipped by the Air Force and are operationally gained by a major command of the USAF if federalized. In addition, the Arizona Air National Guard forces are assigned to Air Expeditionary Forces and are subject to deployment tasking orders along with their active duty and Air Force Reserve counterparts in their assigned cycle deployment window.

Along with their federal reserve obligations, as state militia units the elements of the Arizona ANG are subject to being activated by order of the governor to provide protection of life and property, and preserve peace, order and public safety. State missions include disaster relief in times of earthquakes, hurricanes, floods and forest fires, search and rescue, protection of vital public services, and support to civil defense.

== Components ==
The Arizona Air National Guard consists of the following major units:

- 161st Air Refueling Wing

The wing's origins can be traced to the establishment of the 197th Fighter Squadron on 12 December 1946. It operates: KC-135R Stratotankers
Stationed at: Phoenix Sky Harbor International Airport, Phoenix
Gained by: Air Mobility Command
Provides aerial refueling support to Air Force, Navy and Marine Corps and allied nation aircraft.

- 162nd Fighter Wing

Established 1969 as group, operates F-16C/D Fighting Falcons
Stationed at: Tucson Air National Guard Base, Tucson
Gained by: Air Combat Command
The largest ANG fighter wing consisting of about 1,100 full-time members and 600 part-time citizen airmen. The wing consists of three squadrons and more than 70 F-16 aircraft. the 162d conducts international pilot training in support of foreign military sales (FMS) program.

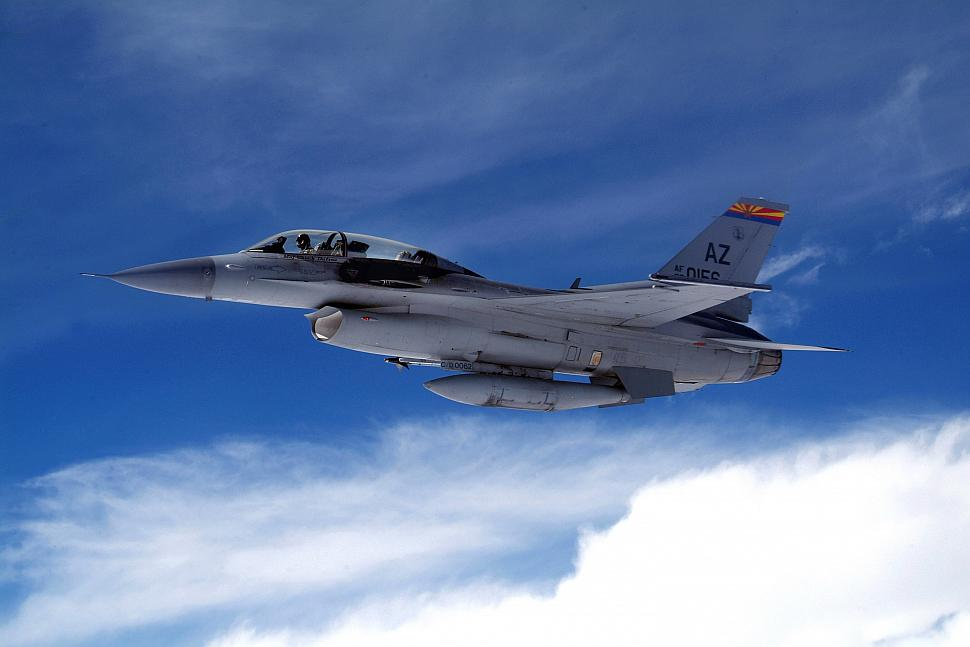
F-16D of the 152nd Fighter Squadron in 2006.

- 214th Reconnaissance Group

Established 29 August 2007; operates: MQ-9 Reapers
Stationed at: Davis-Monthan Air Force Base, Tucson
Gained by: Air Combat Command
The wing flies the MQ-9 Reaper over hostile areas via satellite from ground control stations in Tucson

Support Unit Functions and Capabilities:

- 107th Air Control Squadron

Stationed at: Luke Air Force Base, Glendale
Gained by: Air Combat Command
It provides radar control to flying units operating in local airspaces. It operates and maintains extensive radar and communications to train student Weapons Directors for postings throughout the Air Force and Air National Guard.

- 111th Space Operations Squadron

Stationed at: Sky Harbor Air National Guard Base, Phoenix
Gained by: Air Force Space Command
It is a space communications unit, being the military's first unit to operate free-floating balloons in the near space environment.

== History ==
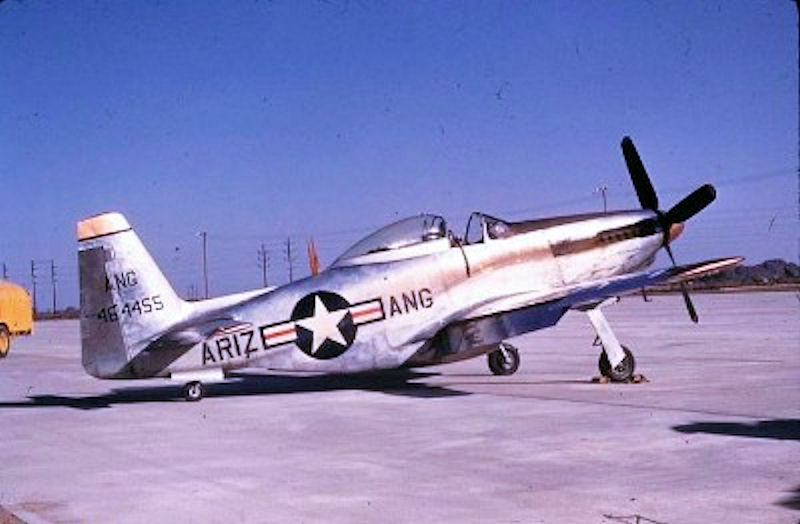
An F-51H Mustang of the 197th Fighter Squadron. The Mustang was flown from 1946 until 1954.

On 24 May 1946, the United States Army Air Forces, in response to dramatic postwar military budget cuts, imposed by President Harry S. Truman, allocated inactive unit designations to the National Guard Bureau for the formation of an Air Force National Guard. These unit designations were allotted and transferred to various State National Guard bureaus to provide them unit designations to re-establish them as Air National Guard units.

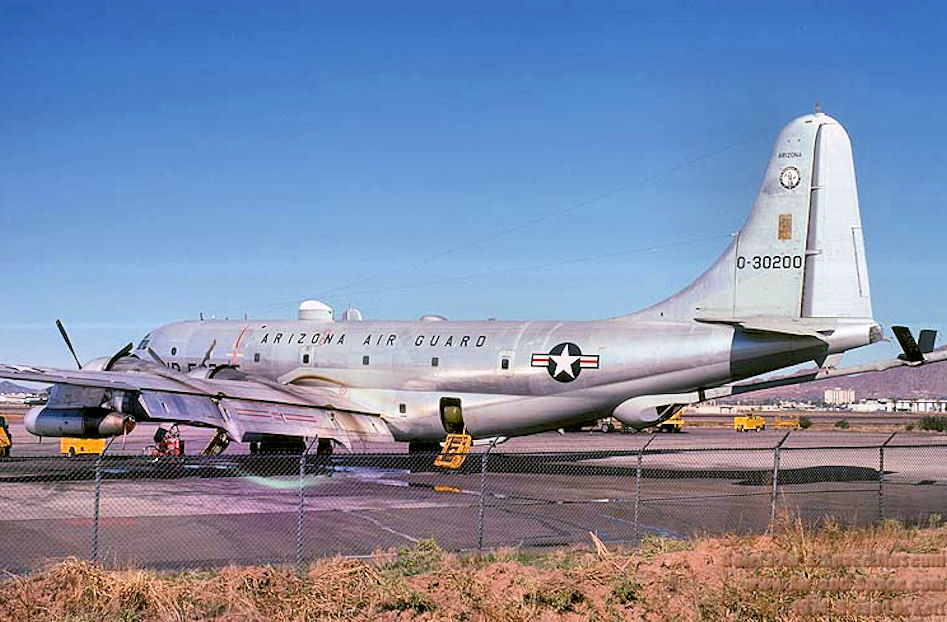
KC-97 of the 197th Air Refueling Squadron in 1976.

The Arizona ANG was founded by Barry Goldwater, and its origins date to the formation of the 197th Fighter Squadron at Luke Army Airfield, Glendale, receiving federal recognition on 12 December 1946. It was equipped with F-51D Mustangs and its mission was the air defense of the state. 18 September 1947, however, is considered the Arizona Air National Guard's official birth concurrent with the establishment of the United States Air Force as a separate branch of the United States military under the National Security Act

Under Goldwater‘s direction, the Arizona ANG integrated in 1947, two years before President Truman's Executive Order 9981 ending racial segregation in the United States Armed Forces.

On 2 October 1957 the 197th Fighter-Interceptor Squadron was authorized to expand to a group level, and the 161st Fighter-Interceptor Group was allotted by the National Guard Bureau, extended federal recognition and activated.

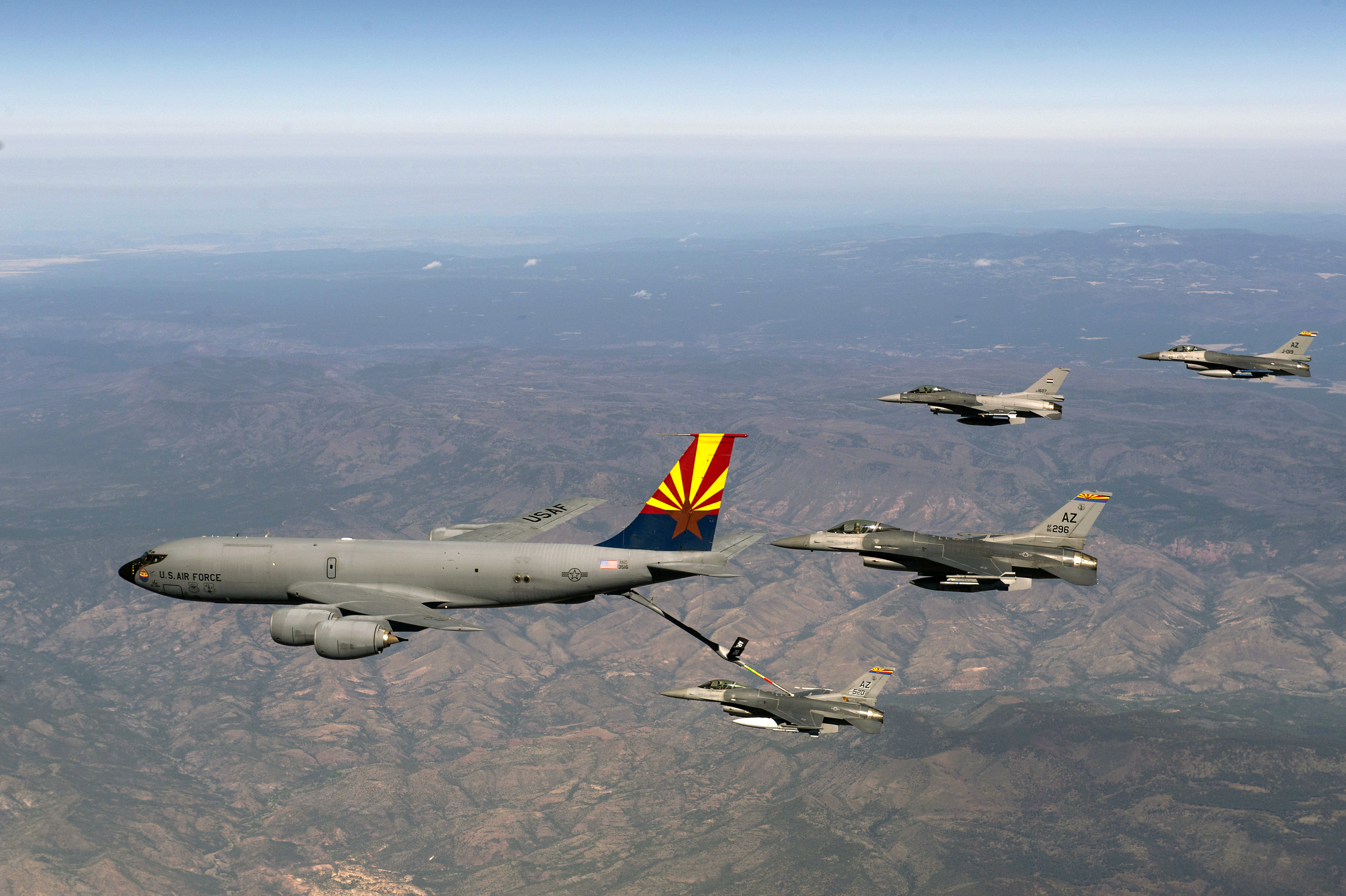
KC-135 of the 161st Air Refueling Wing refueling 162nd Fighter Wing F-16s in 2015.

Today, the Arizona ANG performs a worldwide air refueling mission, a homeland defense training mission and tactical battlefield reconnaissance missions. Its 111th Space Operations Squadron is the first space communications unit in the United States military.

After the September 11th, 2001 terrorist attacks on the United States, elements of every Air National Guard unit in Arizona have been activated in support of the global war on terrorism. Flight crews, aircraft maintenance personnel, communications technicians, air controllers and air security personnel were engaged in Operation Noble Eagle air defense overflights of major United States cities. Also, Arizona ANG units have been deployed overseas as part of Operation Enduring Freedom in Afghanistan and Operation Iraqi Freedom in Iraq as well as other locations as directed.

== See also ==
- Arizona Wing Civil Air Patrol
