= 146th Airlift Wing =

California Air National Guard unit

146th Airlift Wing

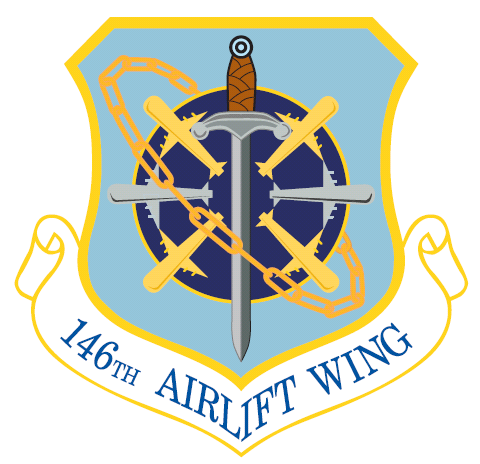
- 146th Air Wingemblem
- Active: 1950–1953; 1953–present
- Country: United States
- Allegiance: California
- Branch: Air National Guard
- Type: Wing
- Role: Airlift, fire suppression, aeromedical evacuation
- Part of: California Air National Guard
- Garrison/HQ: Channel Islands Air National Guard Station, Oxnard, California
- Nickname: Hollywood Guard
- Decorations: Air Force Outstanding Unit Award

Commanders
- Current commander: Colonel Christopher Lutz

Insignia
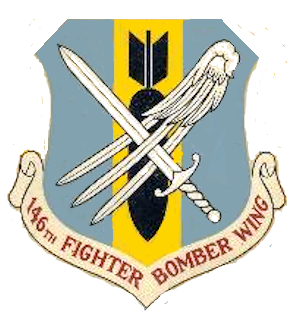
- 146th Fighter-Bomber Wing emblem
- Tail stripe: Green Stripe "Channel Islands"

The 146th Airlift Wing is a unit of the California Air National Guard, stationed at Channel Islands Air National Guard Station, Oxnard, California. If activated to federal service, the Wing is gained by the United States Air Force Air Mobility Command.

== Mission ==
The 146th AW's primary mission is to provide global military airlift capability to a full spectrum of state and federal agencies. Flying the Lockheed C-130J Super Hercules aircraft, the 146th has provided humanitarian relief in the aftermath of hurricanes, earthquakes, floods, and other disasters, in California, the United States and internationally.

The 146th is one of four C-130 ANG units whose contribution to the United States' aerial firefighting capability includes equipment and techniques for efficient, effective suppression of large wildland fires from the air. Since 1974, using the Modular Airborne Fire Fighting System (MAFFS) units supplied by the US Forest Service and mounted in four C-130s, the wing's aerial firefighting crews have been credited with saving many lives and millions of dollars' worth of structures, forests, and brushland in California and other states and countries.

MAFFS II was used for the first time on a fire in July 2010, using the latest generation Lockheed Martin C-130J Super Hercules aircraft. The 146th Airlift Wing was the first to transition to the MAFFS 2 system in 2008, and it remains the only unit flying the new system on the C-130J aircraft.

== Units ==
The 146th Airlift Wing consists of the following units:

- 146th Operations Group

115th Airlift Squadron
146th Aeromedical Evacuation Squadron
146th Contingency Response Flight

- 146th Mission Support Group

146th Security Forces Squadron

- 146th Maintenance Group
- 146th Aircraft Maintenance Squadron ( AMXS )
- 146th Medical Group

== History ==
The 115th Airlift Squadron, assigned to the Wing's 146th Operations Group, is a descendant organization of the 115th Observation Squadron, established on 16 June 1924. It is one of the 29 original National Guard Observation Squadrons of the United States Army National Guard formed before World War II. It is the oldest unit in the California Air National Guard, having over 100 years of service to the state and nation.

=== California Air National Guard ===
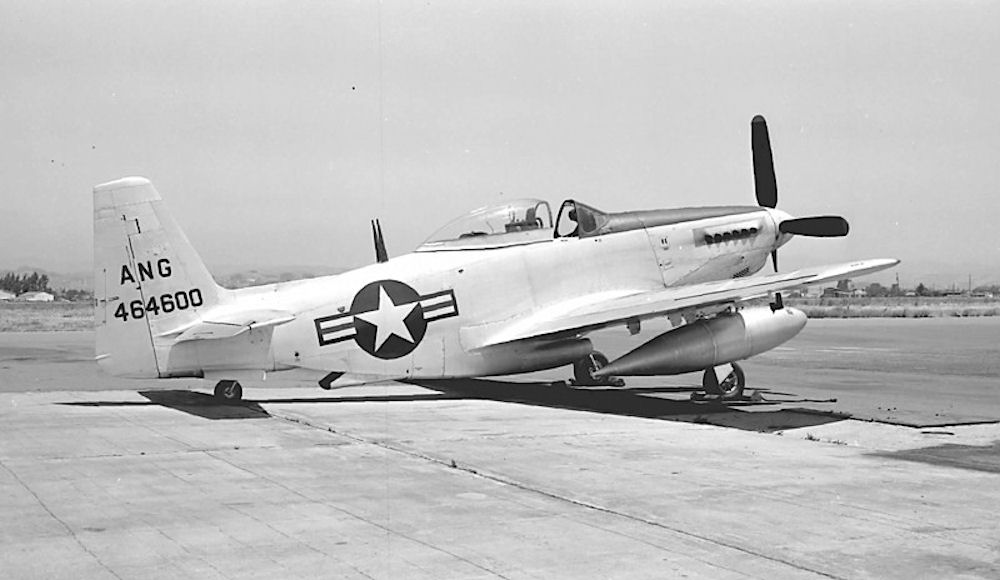
195th Fighter Squadron F-51H Mustang 44–64600, 1952

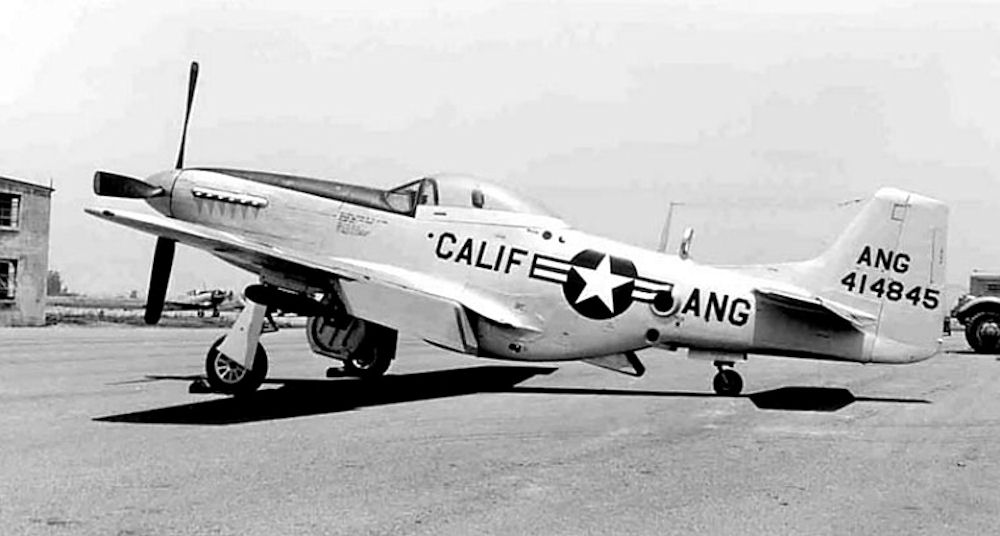
196th Fighter Squadron P-51D Mustang 44–14845, Norton Air Force Base

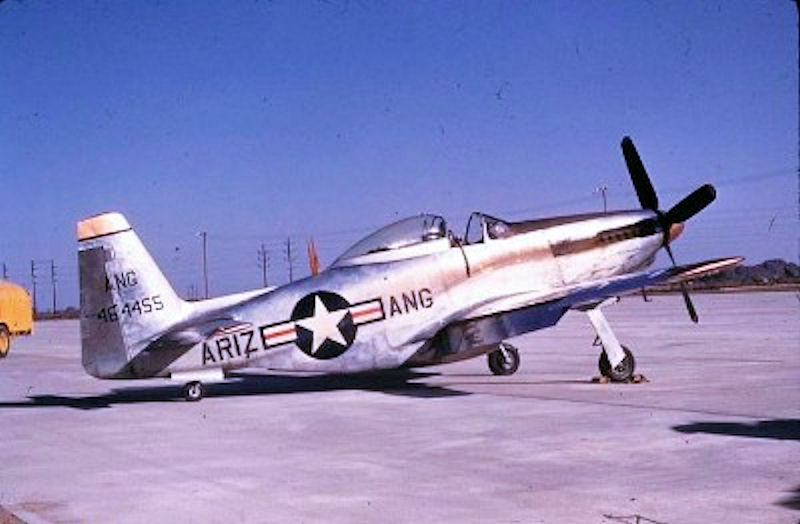
197th Fighter Squadron F-51H Mustang, AF Ser. No. 44-64455

==== 146th Composite Wing ====
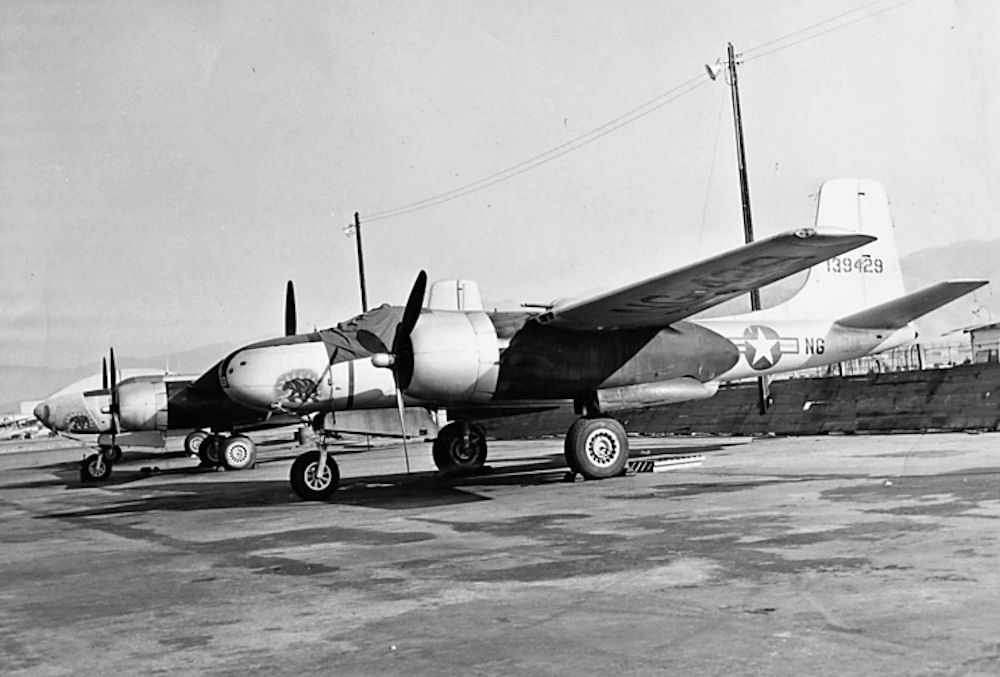
B-26C of the 115th Light Bombardment Squadron, Van Nuys Airport, 1950

At the end of October 1950, the Air National Guard converted to the wing-base (Hobson Plan) organization. As a result, the 62d Fighter Wing was withdrawn from the California ANG and was inactivated on 31 October 1950. The 146th Composite Wing was established by the National Guard Bureau, allocated to the state of California, recognized and activated 1 November 1950; assuming the personnel, equipment, and mission of the inactivated 62d Fighter Wing.

The 146th Composite Group was assigned to the new wing as its operational group with the three fighter squadrons. The 115th Bombardment Squadron (Light) at Van Nuys Airport was transferred from the 62d Fighter Wing to the new 144th Composite Wing. The 115th was a re-designation of the original California National Guard pre-war 115th Observation Squadron with origins dating to 1917.

==== Korean War federalization ====
With the surprise invasion of South Korea on 25 June 1950, and the regular military's complete lack of readiness, most of the Air National Guard was federalized placed on active duty. The 146th Fighter Wing was federalized on 1 March 1951 and assigned to Tactical Air Command. It was re-designated as the 146th Fighter-Bomber Wing and moved to Moody AFB, Georgia, where it was assigned two federalized ANG squadrons from Idaho and Montana and became a F-51D Fighter-Bomber training unit.

- The 115th Bomb Squadron was moved to Langley AFB, Virginia, where it became a training unit for B-45A Tornado jet bomber crews.
- The 195th Fighter Squadron remained at Van Nuys however it was placed under the Air Defense Command 28th Air Division. It was re-equipped with long-range F-51H Mustangs and became part of the air defense forces for Southern California.
- The 196th Fighter Squadron was assigned to the Georgia ANG 116th Fighter-Bomber Wing, re-equipped with F-84D Thunderjets and deployed to Japan and South Korea where it engaged in combat over Korea.
- The 197th Fighter Squadron stayed at Luke AFB, Arizona where it was assigned to the 127th Fighter-Bomber Wing, equipped with F-84A Thunderjets, and was a training unit for F-84 pilots heading to the Korean War.

The units were returned to California State control in November 1952, and on 1 January 1953, the 146th Fighter-Bomber Wing was reformed at Van Nuys Airport.

==== Air Defense Command ====
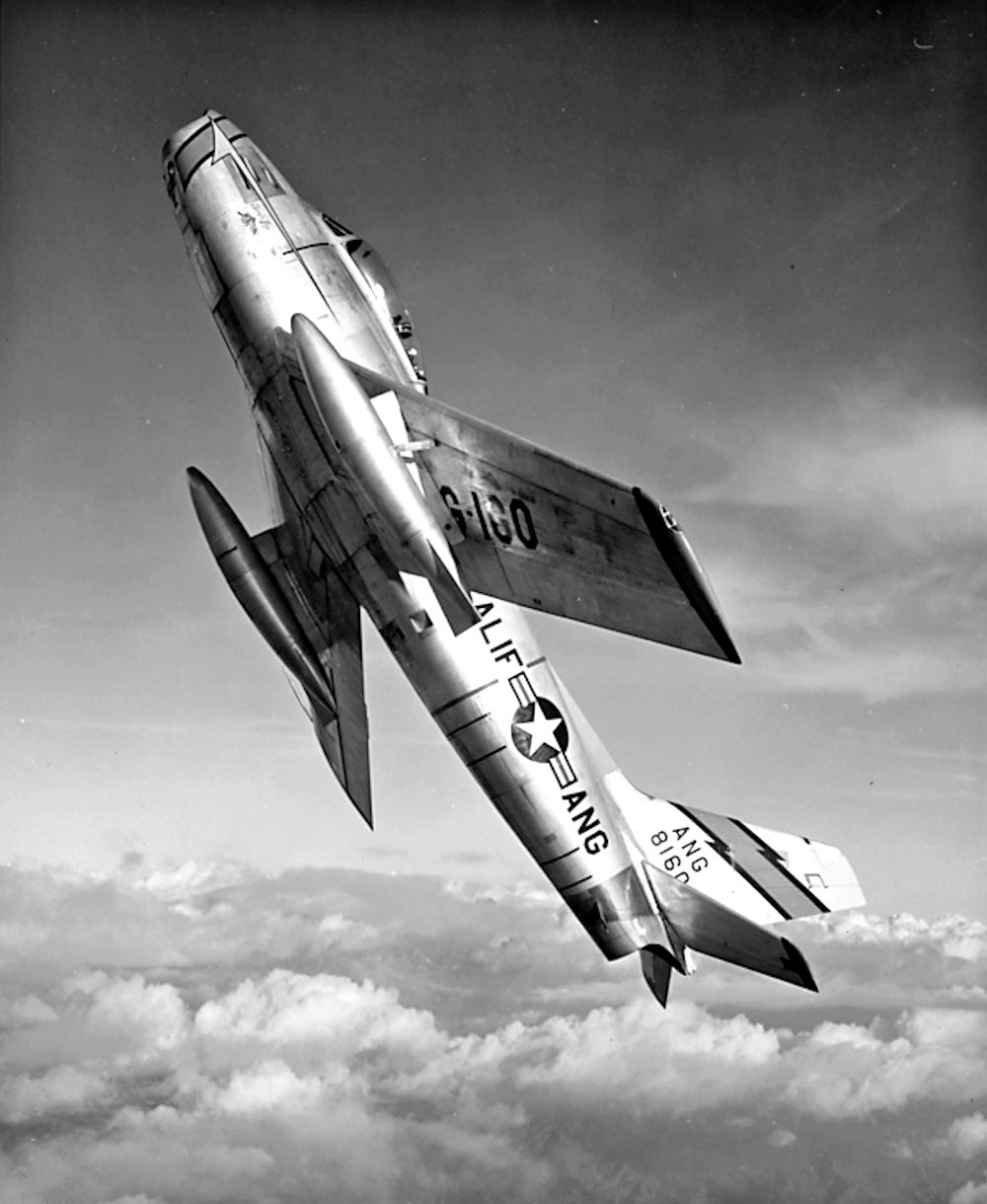
115th Fighter-Bomber Squadron – North American F-86A Sabre 48-160

With the end of combat in Korea, jet-propelled aircraft began to be made available to the Air National Guard. In 1953, the 195th at Van Nuys received F-86A Sabres, to be used in day-interceptor missions. The 195th's F-51Hs were reassigned to the 115th, now a Fighter-Bomber Squadron (FBS); the 115th was upgraded to F-86As in late 1953. In 1954, the 196th FBS at Norton AFB was equipped with F-86As, and the 197th at Luke AFB also being upgraded to F-86As. With the F-86A, the squadrons began standing dusk-to-dawn alerts, joining its Air Defense Command active-duty counterparts. On 1 January 1954, the 196th FBS was moved from the expanding Norton AFB to Ontario Municipal Airport. The 146th was re-designated the 146th Fighter-Interceptor Wing (FIW) on 1 July 1955.

The 146th FIW continued to fly the F-86A until 31 March 1958. On 1 April 1958, the transition was made to the F-86L Sabre Interceptor, which was designed from the onset as an interceptor, had all-weather capability, and thus was able to be used in all weather. In addition, the F-86L could be controlled and directed by the SAGE computer-controlled Ground Control Interceptor (Radar) sites which would vector the aircraft to the unidentified target for interception.

In 1958, the 196th Fighter-Bomber Squadron at Ontario Airport was authorized to expand to a group level. The 163d Fighter-Interceptor Group was federally recognized on 17 May; the 196th FBS was re-designated as a Fighter-Interceptor Squadron and transferred to the new group under California ANG jurisdiction. On 2 October 1957, the 197th FBS at Luke AFB was expanded into the 161st Fighter-Interceptor Group, and came under Arizona ANG jurisdiction.

==== Strategic Airlift ====
In 1961, the 146th FIW was reassigned to Military Air Transport Service (MATS), trading in its Sabre interceptors for 4-engined C-97 Stratofreighter transports. With air transportation recognized as a critical wartime need, the 146th was re-designated the 146th Air Transport Wing (Heavy). During the Berlin Crisis of 1961, both the Wing and squadrons were federalized on 1 October 1961. From Van Nuys, the wing augmented MATS airlift capability worldwide in support of the Air Force's needs. It returned again to California state control on 31 August 1962. Throughout the 1960s, the unit flew long-distance transport missions in support of Air Force requirements, frequently sending aircraft to Hawaii, Japan, the Philippines, and, during the Vietnam War, to both South Vietnam, Okinawa, and Thailand.

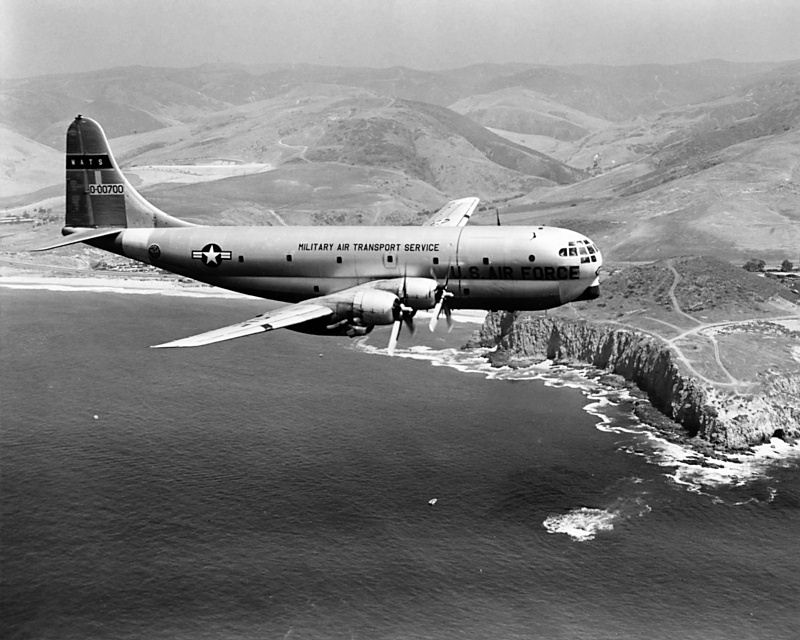
115th Air Transport Squadron C-97C Stratofreighter 50-700 along the California coastline, 1962

The C-97s were retired in 1970 and the unit was transferred to Tactical Air Command (TAC). It transitioned to the C-130A Hercules theater transport, flying missions in support of TAC throughout the United States and Alaska. In 1973, the C-130A models were transferred to the Republic of Vietnam Air Force and they were replaced by the C-130B. During this period, both the 115th and its sister squadron, the 195th Tactical Airlift Squadron shared the same pool of aircraft.

With the end of the Vietnam War, the California National Guard bureau began to downsize the 146th Tactical Airlift Wing (TAS) as part of the post-war drawdown. With C-130s units being transferred to Military Airlift Command, the junior 195th TAS was inactivated on 30 September 1974. The personnel, equipment, and aircraft of the 195th TFS were reassigned to the 115th TAS.

In the early 1970s, USAF's "Total Force" policy brought the wing into full partnership with its Air Force counterparts by mandating co-operation and teamwork between Air Guard and active duty Air Force units in all phases of military airlift operations. As a result, in succeeding years the wing's C-130s traveled to all corners of the world, airlifting troops, passengers, and cargo during training missions, exercise deployments, and real-world military operations to support Federal and State military airlift requirements.

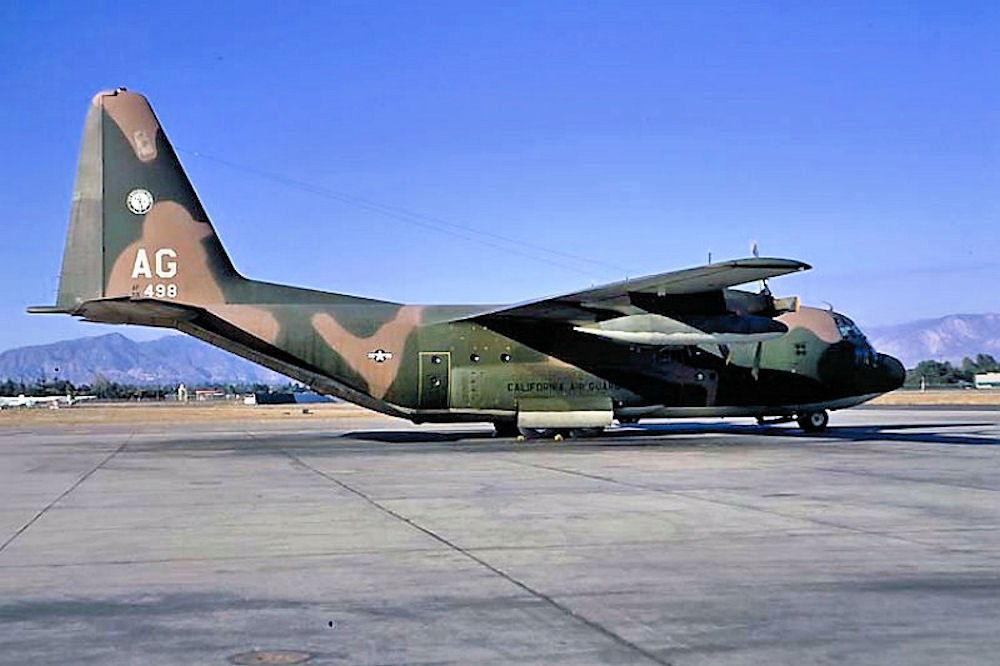
195th TAS C-130A Hercules 56-498, 1970

The 146th TAW and its subordinate units participated in numerous Cold War military exercises such as Team Spirit, Volant Oak, Red Flag, and Reforger. Other Joint Chief of Staff exercises included "Ember Dawn IV" in Alaska and "Brave Shield" in Europe. In 1979, the Air National Guard and Air Force Reserve assumed full responsibility for airlift operations in Panama, which recently moved to Puerto Rico, a commitment still fulfilled.

In mid-December 1989, and continuing for several weeks, wing aircraft, air crews, and support personnel on deployment for exercise Volant Oak at Howard AFB, Canal Zone, Panama, flew combat airlift missions for U. S. Southern Command during Operation "Just Cause" in Panama. More than 100 combat sorties were flown by 146th aircraft and crews, with no casualties or damage to aircraft.

==== Channel Islands Air National Guard Station ====
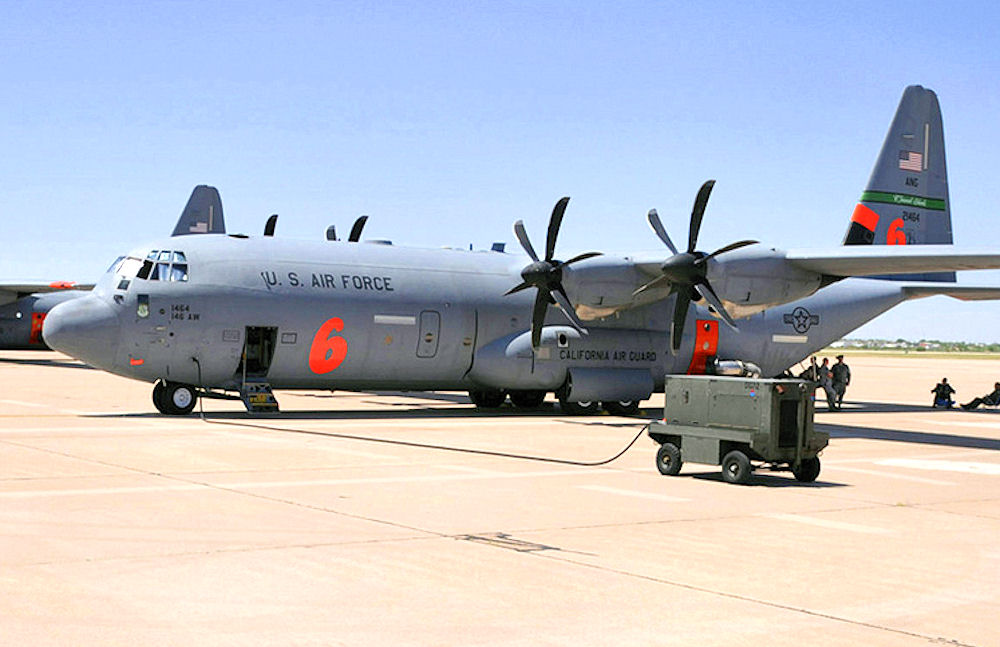
146th Airlift Wing Modular Airborne Fire Fighting System (MAFFS) C-130J Hercules aerial firefighter

In December 1988, after more than six decades of Air National Guard flying tradition in the San Fernando Valley, the 146th Airlift Wing began moving from Van Nuys to a brand new facility, built on Federal land leased to the State of California, adjacent to the Naval Air Warfare Center Weapons Division, an active duty Navy flying installation.

The 146th operates from the military airfield at the Naval Air Warfare Center Weapons Division, along with Navy and other Federal aviation activities. By March 1990, all but a small remnant of wing personnel had transferred operations to Channel Islands ANG Station. Shortly thereafter, the old Van Nuys facility was closed and turned over to the City of Los Angeles. On 30 April 1990, the flag at Van Nuys ANG Base was lowered for the last time during a special ceremony.

The addition of a C-130 flight simulator facility is planned. Construction was delayed in 2019 when the funds allocated by Congress were diverted to build the border wall due to a Declaration of National Emergency. In January 2023, the construction for the building to house the new simulator finally broke ground.

==== Persian Gulf ====
In August 1990, the world was moving swiftly toward armed confrontation in the Persian Gulf. By late January 1991, the 146th Airlift Wing had provided U.S. Central Command and U.S. Air Forces in Europe more than 650 personnel, voluntarily and involuntarily activated, who participated in Operations Desert Shield and Desert Storm. Aircraft and air crews from the 115th Airlift Squadron flew two-month-long tours of duty in Operation Volant Pine, a backfill of military airlifters to Europe by Air National Guard C-130s.

In 1997, wing members deployed in excess of 10,000 days supporting State and Federal missions. During the period the unit played critical roles in support of DoD missions deploying to Oman and Saudi Arabia in support of Southern Watch, and in peacetime humanitarian airlift and aerial fire fighting, among the many missions accomplished by the wing during the award period.

In 1999, the 146th Mission Support Group excelled in their support and service to the wing, the State of California, and the nation. Personnel from civil engineering, security forces, and communications deployed to the Middle East in support of Operations Northern and Southern Watch. Members of the 146th Aeromedical Evacuation Squadron (AES) performed over 7,200 workdays during deployments in 1999, mostly outside the continental United States, supporting operations in Bosnia and Southwest Asia. During the year, the 146th AES also received the two top national honors for medical operations: The Mars Trophy, which is presented annually to the outstanding Air National Guard medical unit, and the George E. Schaeffer Trophy that is presented to the top medical unit in the Reserve component.

=== Afghanistan, Iraq, and the Global War on Terror ===
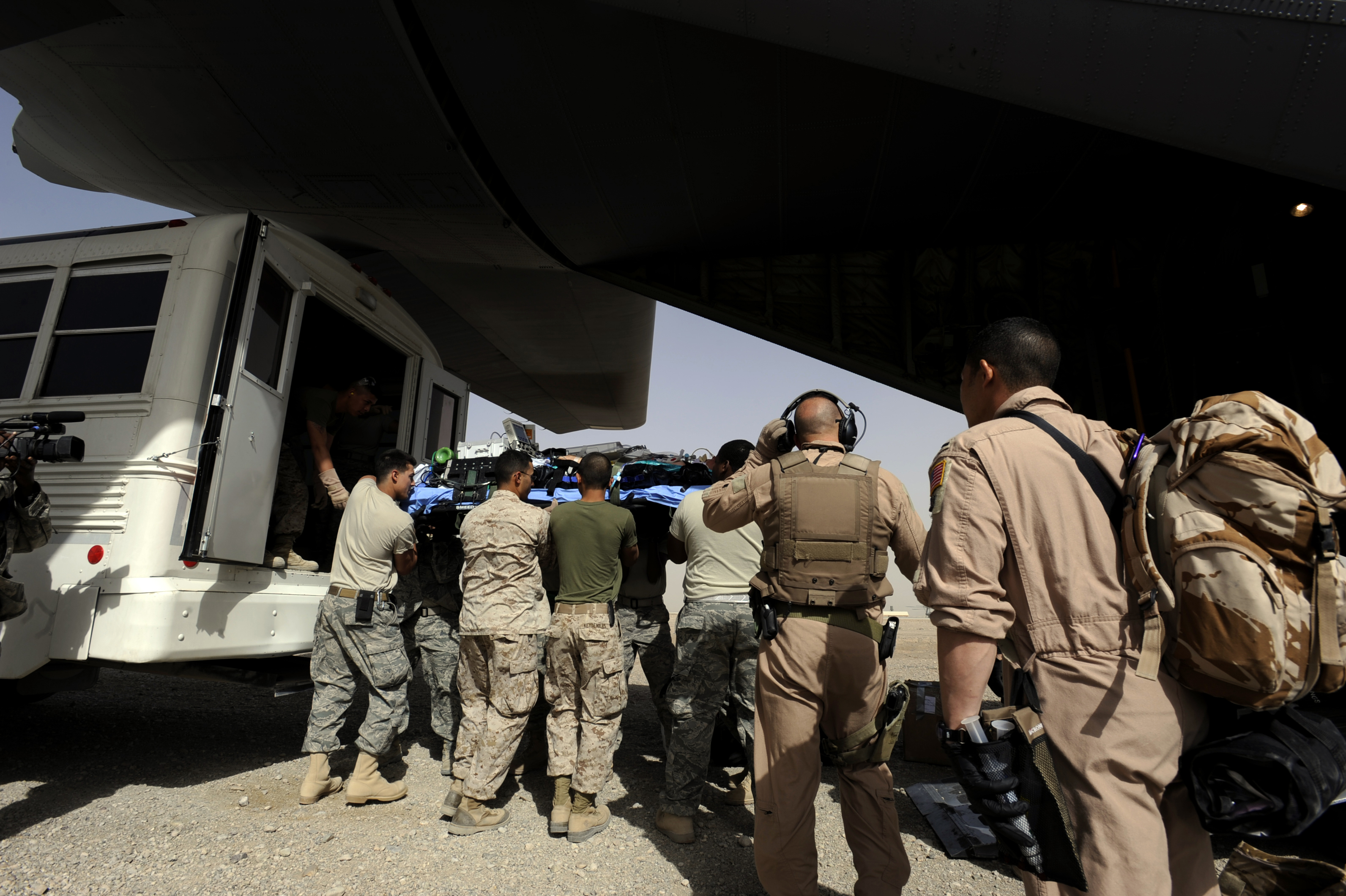
774th Expeditionary Airlift Squadron deployed in Afghanistan

After the terrorist attacks on Sept 11th, 2001, the 146th Airlift Wing has been heavily involved in mobility operations within the USCENTCOM theater, providing intra-theater airlift mainly within Afghanistan, Iraq, and surrounding countries. It's airmen have been deployed almost constantly since 2001, for periods of up to six months at a time. In one instance, five of the wing's C-130J aircraft flew to Afghanistan with a full complement of maintenance and aircrew and from the 146's Aeromedical Evacuation Squadron, Air Terminal Operations Squadron and Civil Engineering Squadron. The squadrons deployed for three months to provide airlift and airdrop capabilities to forward operating bases. In a separate Afghanistan deployment, the wing deployed an aviation package and served as part of the 774th Expeditionary Airlift Squadron. During the four-month deployment, wing members transported more than 8,900 tons of cargo and 25,367 passengers, more than any airlift squadron in the history of the U.S. Air Force. The unit was also heavily involved in the fight against ISIS - providing critical re-supply and transport capabilities to the US military and its allies to locations in Syria, Iraq, and Jordan. Most recently, the unit deployed to a new location, marking a shift for the wing as they transition from supporting operations in the Middle East to operations in the Horn of Africa. Since 2021, The 146th Airlift Wing has played actives roles in the following Operations: ENDURING FREEDOM, IRAQI FREEDOM, NEW DAWN, INHERENT RESOLVE, FREEDOM'S SENTINEL, RESOLUTE SUPPORT, and ENDURING SENTINEL.

=== The Global Pandemic and California civil unrest ===
Early 2020 brought COVID-19 to the United States and the 146th Airlift Wing remained one of the busiest C-130 units across the Air National Guard. In addition to providing essential services to medical facilities in communities across the state of California from the Medical Group amd Aeromedical Evacuation Squadron, members of the 115th Airlift Squadron transported over 400 ventilators to locations across the Eastern United States, providing much needed medical equipment to locations that were severely lacking. CE Squadron, Services and Mission Support personnel provided service to Southern and Central California food banks, provided medical strike teams at senior living centers and assisted with vaccination distribution across California. 146th AW Chaplain religious support teams mobilized to assist at the Los Angeles County County Coroner with body identification and proper disposition of remains.

In addition to fighting COVID-19, the state of California was also reeling from protests and civil disturbances in mid-2020. In response, the 146th Airlift Wing was mobilized to transport National Guard soldiers and Airmen to locations across the state to provide security and assistance to civil authorities if required. "The unit engaged in 63 hours of flying time to move 1,574 National Guard members along with 364,600 pounds of supplies in C-130J Super Hercules aircraft." This immense operation occurred within a span of 72 hours and marked the largest troop movement in California Air National Guard History.

Also in 2020, members of the 146th Maintenance Group provided critical aircraft recovery support by assisting Marines from Twentynine Palms, California, as they disassembled, lifted and loaded the remains of a KC-130J aircraft that collided with a Marine F-35B during a refueling mission onto a transport truck.

As a result of the high OPSTEMPO in 2020, the 146th airlift Wing was awarded the Major General Stanley F. H. Newman Award, recognizing the most outstanding Air National Guard wing contributing to the overall success of the Mobility Air Forces mission.

=== Modular Airborne Fire Fighting System (MAFFS) ===
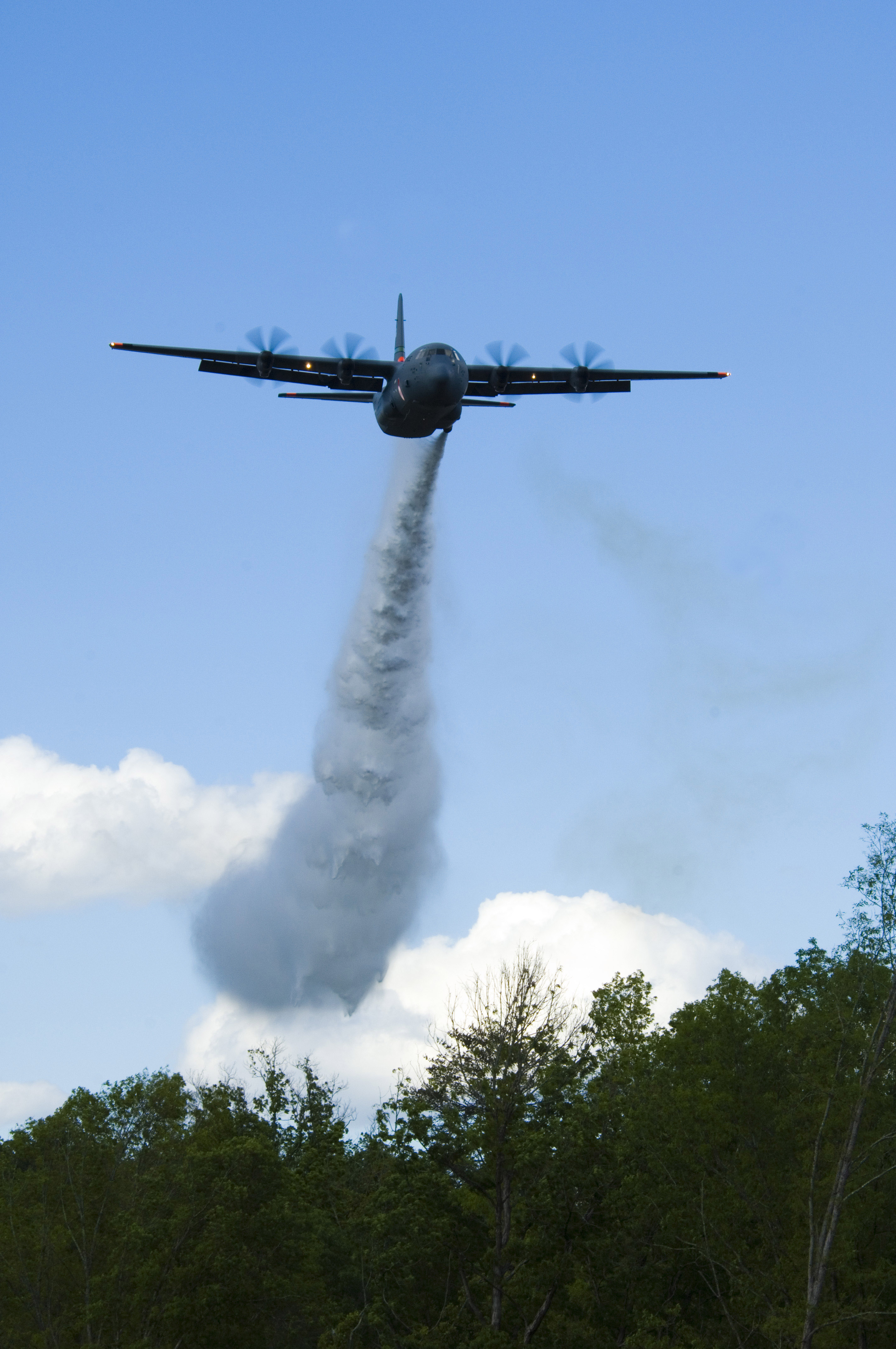
146th dropping water over trees during a MAFFS training exercise

The 146th is one of only four C-130 Air Guard and AF Reserve units whose contribution to the nation's aerial firefighting capability includes equipment and techniques for efficient, effective suppression of large wildland fires from the air. Since 1974, using the Modular Airborne Fire Fighting System (MAFFS) units supplied by the U.S. Forest Service and mounted in four C-130s, the wing's aerial firefighting crews have been credited with saving many lives and countless millions of dollars' worth of structures, forests, and brush land in California, and many other States and countries as well, taking part in over 5,000 aerial firefighting missions in California and across the Western United States saving valuable property, natural resources, and lives. Prior to the period covering 2019-2021 - which produced two of the three largest wildfires in California's history - the fire seasons of 1993 and 1994 were the worst on record. The Malibu fires of 1993 literally burned to the edge of the 146th AW's base. But it was in 1994, with over 55,000 wildfires raging throughout the western States, that the 146th, along with three other MAFFS-equipped guard and reserve units flew nearly 2,000 missions, dropping fifty-one million pounds of fire retardant. The 146th has been involved in every major wildfire in recent history, to include the Thomas Fire, the Woolsey Fire, the August Complex Fire, The Dixie Fire, The Mendocino Complex Fire and the Rim Fire. In 2021, the 146th Airlift Wing finished constructing a permanent fixed-base retardant reload pit on its parking ramp, enabling the base at Channel Islands to provide a valuable strategic location for Southern California Aerial Firefighting. The new fire-retardant ground tanks have increased the storage capability five-fold from a 10,000-gallon capacity to 50,000 gallons to accommodate more MAFFS aircraft and the U.S. Forest Service's Very Large Air Tankers (VLAT's) with water and fire-retardant solution.

=== Lineage ===
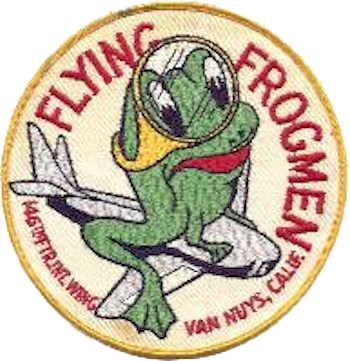
Unofficial 146th FIW patch

- Established as the 146th Composite Wing and allotted to the National Guard on 31 October 1950

Organized and received federal recognition on 1 November 1950
Redesignated 146th Fighter Wing on 1 February 1951
Federalized and placed on active duty on 1 March 1951
Redesignated: 146th Fighter-Bomber Wing on 1 June 1951
Inactivated on 1 January 1953
Activated in the California Air National Guard on 1 January 1953
Redesignated 146th Fighter-Interceptor Wing on 1 July 1955
Redesignated: 146th Air Transport Wing on 1 October 1961
Federalized and placed on active duty on 1 October 1961
Released from active duty and returned to California state control on 31 August 1962
Redesignated 146th Military Airlift Wing on 1 January 1966
Redesignated: 146th Tactical Airlift Wing on 1 April 1970
Redesignated 146th Airlift Wing on 16 March 1992

=== Assignments ===
- California Air National Guard, 1 November 1950
- Fourth Air Force, 1 March 1951
- Strategic Air Command, 1 April 1951
- Ninth Air Force, 25 October 1951 – 1 January 1953
- California Air National Guard, 1 January 1953 – present

Gained by: Tactical Air Command
Gained by: 27th Air Division, Air Defense Command, 1 July 1955
Gained by: Los Angeles Air Defense Sector, Air Defense Command, 1 July 1955
Gained by: Western Transport Air Force, Military Air Transport Service, 1 October 1961
Gained by: Twenty-Second Air Force, Military Airlift Command, 8 January 1966
Gained by: Tactical Air Command, 1 April 1970
Gained by: Air Combat Command, 1 June 1992
Gained by: Air Mobility Command, 1 April 1997

=== Components ===
- 146th Composite Group (later 146th Fighter Group, 146th Air Transport Group, 146th Military Airlift Group, 146th Tactical Airlift Group, 146th Operations Group, 1 November 1950 – 1 January 1953, 1 January 1953 – c. 11 April 1970, c. 11 April 1970 – 9 February 1975, 16 March 1992 – present
- 115th Tactical Airlift Squadron, later 115th Airlift Squadron, 9 February 1975 – 16 March 1992
- 146th Aeromedical Evacuation Squadron, 9 February 1975 – 16 March 1992
- 195th Aeromedical Evacuation Flight, 1 July 1961 – 1 October 1967

=== Stations ===
- Van Nuys Airport, California, 16 September 1946
- Lockheed Air Terminal, Burbank, California, 1 November 1950 – 1 November 1952
- Moody Air Force Base, Georgia, 1 April 1951
- George Air Force Base, California, 25 October 1951 – 1 January 1953
- Van Nuys Airport, California, 1 January 1953 –
- Channel Islands Air National Guard Station, California. 1 December 1988 – present

=== Aircraft ===
- A-26 Invader, 1950–1951
- F-51D Mustang, 19506–1953
- B-45 Tornado, 1951–1952
- F-51H Mustang, 1953
- F-86A Sabre, 1953–1957
- F-86F Sabre, 1957–1959
- F-86H Sabre, 1959–1961
- C-97C Stratofreighter, 1961–1970
- C-130A Hercules, 1970–1973
- C-130B Hercules, 1973–1981
- C-130E Hercules, 1981–2002
- C-130J Hercules, 2002 – present

== Decorations ==
- Air Force Outstanding Unit Award

== In popular culture ==
- Opening scenes of the 1959 movie A Stranger in My Arms were filmed in front of and inside the 146th's hangar at Van Nuys Airport.
- Scenes of the 1965 episode "Ed the Pilot" of the television show Mister Ed were shot at Van Nuys Airport in front of the hangar of the 146th Air Transportation Wing.
- C-97G 53-0356 of the 146th Air Transportation Wing, California Air National Guard can be seen in the television show Mission Impossible in the 1967 Episode entitled "The Diamond" at 37 mins. The boarding ramp, when lowered, displays the numbers 1 4 6 followed by a 146th ATW wing emblem with a large X over it.
- A scene in the 1971 film The Hard Ride was filmed in front of the 146th Military Airlift Wing hangar. A C-97C is shown parked next to its replacement, the C-130A.
- The Bionic Woman episode "The Vega Influence" was shot around the hangar for the 146th Tactical Airlift Wing in 1976.
- The New Adventures of Wonder Woman episode "Flight to Oblivion" (Season 2 Episode 18) was shot around Van Nuys ANGB. The episode was aired on 3 March 1978. In the episode the base was named San Remo AFB.
- The base was also used for Galactica 1980's "Galactica Discovers Earth" Part 3. It was aired on 10 February 1980.
- Special thanks was given during the credits of the movie The Silence of the Lambs to the 146th Tactical Airlift Wing for their assistance in the C-130 aerial scene.
- Special thanks was given during the credits of the movie Air Force One to the 146th Airlift Wing.
- Parts of the movie "Iron Eagle" were filmed on the airfield of the 146th Airlift Wing.
- Raid on Entebbe (film).
- Firefox.
- Call to Glory.
