= 422d Bombardment Squadron =

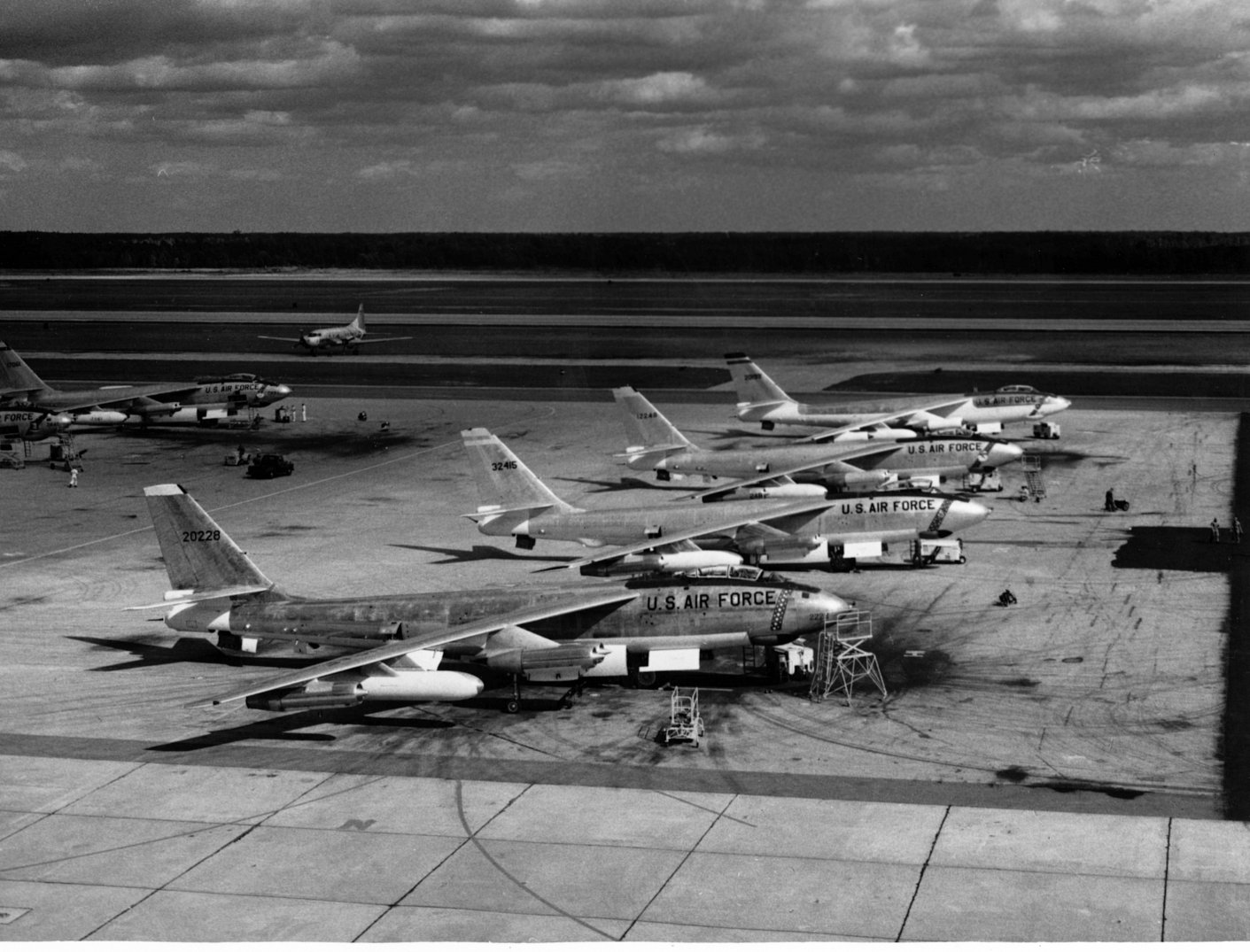
- B-47 Stratojets at a SAC base in the 1950s
- Active: 1942–1946; 1952–1954; 1958–1961
- Country: United States
- Branch: United States Air Force
- Role: Bombardment
- Engagements: European Theater of Operations
- Decorations: Distinguished Unit Citation

Insignia
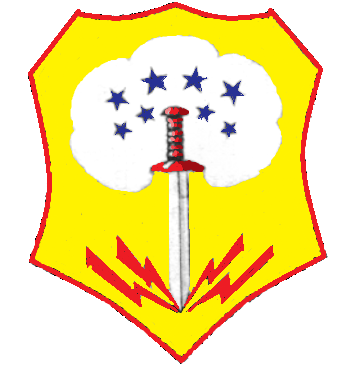
- 422d Bombardment Squadron emblem (Note: Approved 22 October 1953. Description: On a yellow shield of distinctive design a sword (red hilt and steel blade) pointing to base emitting four red flashes (two to the right and two to the left) in chief a stylied white oval cloud formation in back of and above the sword hilt and bearing four blue stars in an arc, two on each side of the hilt; all within a narrow red border.)

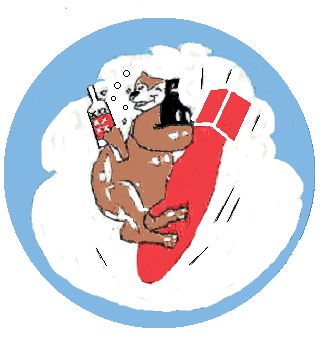
- 422d Bombardment Squadron emblem (World War II)
- World War II fuselage code: JJ

The 422d Bombardment Squadron is an inactive United States Air Force unit. Its last assignment was with the 305th Bombardment Wing at Bunker Hill Air Force Base, Indiana, where it was inactivated on 15 February 1961. The squadron was first activated in March 1942 as the 32d Reconnaissance Squadron, but shortly was renamed as a bombardment unit. After training in the United States, it moved to England in the fall of 1942, where it participated in the strategic bombing campaign against Germany, earning a Distinguished Unit Citation for its actions. Following V-E Day, the squadron moved to Germany, where it formed part of the occupation forces until inactivating in December 1946.

The squadron was again activated in 1953, when it assumed the personnel and equipment of an Air National Guard squadron that had been mobilized for the Korean War and was being returned to state control. It initially trained aircrews in light bombers, but converted to early jet bombers before inactivating the following year.

The squadron's final activation was in 1959, when Strategic Air Command reorganized its Boeing B-47 Stratojet wings from three to four operational squadrons. It inactivated in 1961, when its parent wing began conversion to the Convair B-58 Hustler.

== History ==
=== World War II ===
==== Initial organization and training ====
The squadron was first activated at Salt Lake City Army Air Base, Utah on 1 March 1942 as the 32d Reconnaissance Squadron, one of the original squadrons of the 305th Bombardment Group. and began training on the Boeing B-17 Flying Fortress. The following month, the squadron was designated the 422d Bombardment Squadron. In June, it moved to Geiger Field, Washington, and in July, to Muroc Army Air Field, California for more intensive training. On 23 August, its ground echelon left for Fort Dix, New Jersey and sailed for the European Theater of Operations on the RMS Queen Mary on 5 September, landing in Scotland on 12 September. The air echelon received additional training at Hancock Field, New York, before taking the North Atlantic ferrying route to Prestwick in September and October.

==== Combat in Europe ====
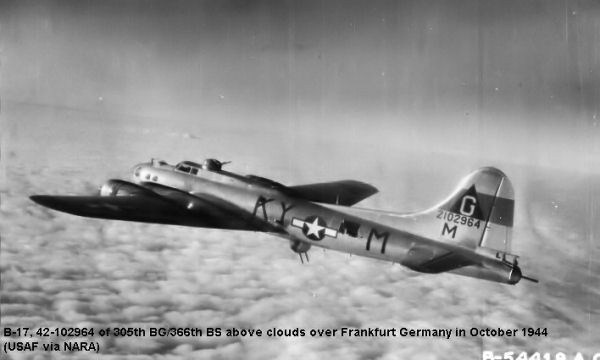
305th Group B-17G Flying Fortress over Germany (Note: Aircraft is Boeing B-17G-60-BO Flying Fortress, serial 42-102964, Miss Yvonne. It survived the war and was sent to Kingman Field, Arizona on 4 December 1945 for storage, then sold for scrap in July 1946. Baugher, Joe (7 August 2023). "1942 USAF Serial Numbers". Joe Baugher.)

The ground echelon arrived at RAF Grafton Underwood in September. The squadron flew eight night bombing missions before the end of October, by which time the entire air echelon had arrived. Joining with the rest of the group in flying daytime missions in the strategic bombing campaign against Germany, it flew its first mission with the group on 17 November 1942. In December it moved to RAF Chelveston, which would be its combat station for the remainder of the war.

The squadron primarily engaged in the strategic bombing campaign against Germany. It attacked targets in Belgium, France and Germany, including Kriegsmarine targets such as submarine pens, docks, harbors and shipyards. This included the attack on the naval yards at Wilhelmshaven on 27 January 1943, when heavy bombers of VIII Bomber Command made their first combat strike in German airspace.

It also attacked automotive factories and marshalling yards on the continent. On 4 April 1943, it made a precision strike on the Renault automotive factory in Paris in the face of devastating fighter attacks by an estimated 50 to 75 Focke-Wulf Fw 190s, which attacked the squadron's formation for fifty minutes, and heavy flak, (Note: Maurer describes the flak as heavy, but Freeman describes it as light, at least until the unit reached its target.) for which it was awarded the Distinguished Unit Citation (DUC). Missions included attacks on Berlin, oil refineries at Merseburg, aircraft factories at Anklam, shipping at Gdynia and the ball bearing factories at Schweinfurt.

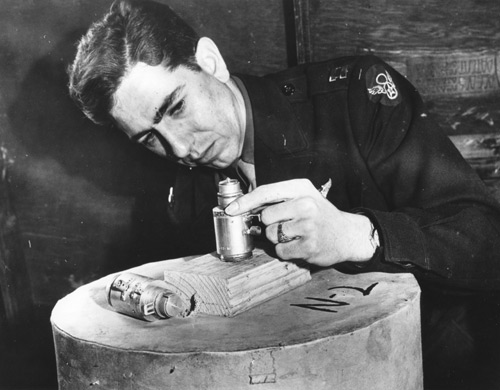
An Eighth Air Force officer adjusts the fuse on a leaflet bomb.

In late summer of 1943, the squadron began flying night bombing missions together with bombers of the Royal Air Force on a trial basis. These experiments ended in September, but with its night flying experience, starting on 7 September 1943, the squadron began flying nighttime "Nickeling" missions, dropping leaflets over occupied territory. Originally, leaflets were thrown overboard by hand. They were then dropped in cardboard boxes until the squadron's armament officer devised a leaflet bomb made of laminated paper and fused to disperse the leaflets at an altitude of 1,000 feet (300 m) to 2,000 feet (610 m) feet. On 24 June 1944 this mission, along with most of the squadron's personnel and aircraft, were transferred to the 858th Bombardment Squadron and the 422d remanned and reequipped as it returned to strategic bombing operations.

The squadron was occasionally diverted from its strategic mission to carry out interdiction and air support missions. In July 1944 it attacked enemy positions in advance of ground forces in Operation Cobra, the breakout at Saint Lo. It attacked antiaircraft batteries to support Operation Market Garden, the airborne attacks near Arnhem attempting to secure a bridgehead across the Rhine. In December 1944 and January 1945, it attacked enemy installations near the Battle of the Bulge. In March 1945, it supported Operation Varsity, the airborne assault across the Rhine in Germany.

The squadron flew its last combat mission on 25 April 1945. Following V-E Day, the squadron moved to Sint-Truiden Airfield in Belgium, from which it conducted photographic mapping flights over Europe and North Africa which came under the name Project Casey Jones. On 15 December 1945 it became part of the occupation force, when it moved to Lechfeld Airfield, Germany which it had bombed on 18 March 1944, and which it now used as an occupation base. The squadron was reduced in both personnel and equipment during 1946, and by the end of October, it had stopped all operations. It was inactivated on 25 December 1946.

=== Tactical bomber training ===
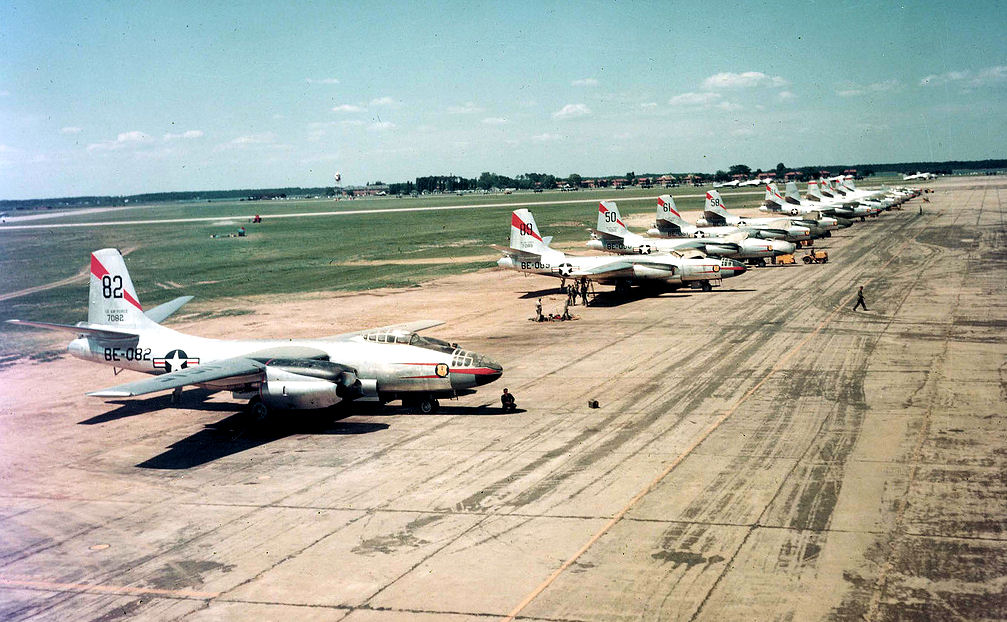
47th Bombardment Wing B-45 Tornadoes at Langley AFB

During the Korean War, Tactical Air Command established a combat crew training school for Douglas B-26 Invader crews at Langley Air Force Base, Virginia. The three squadrons of the 4400th Combat Crew Training Group performing this mission were Air National Guard units that had been called up for the war. In January 1953, these squadrons were released to state control and the 422d Squadron took over the mission, personnel, and equipment of the 115th Bombardment Squadron, which returned to the California Air National Guard. However, the 422d did not remain with the crew training school, but was assigned to the 4430th Air Base Wing, the host organization for Langley. In May, it was attached to the 405th Fighter-Bomber Wing, which had just been activated. The squadron began to re-equip with North American B-45 Tornado light bombers. In December 1953, the squadron moved to RAF Sculthorpe, England, where it was attached to the 47th Bombardment Wing. Three months later, it was inactivated and its personnel and equipment redistributed to the other units of the 47th Wing.

=== Strategic Air Command ===
From 1958, the Boeing B-47 Stratojet wings of Strategic Air Command (SAC) began to assume an alert posture at their home bases, reducing the amount of time spent on alert at overseas bases. The SAC alert cycle divided itself into four parts: planning, flying, alert and rest to meet General Thomas S. Power's initial goal of maintaining one third of SAC's planes on fifteen minute ground alert, fully fueled and ready for combat to reduce vulnerability to a Soviet missile strike. To implement this new system B-47 wings reorganized from three to four squadrons. The 422d was activated at MacDill Air Force Base, Florida as the fourth squadron of the 305th Bombardment Wing. In June of that year, the unit moved to Bunker Hill Air Force Base, Indiana. As the 305th Wing transitioned to the Convair B-58 Hustler, the squadron was inactivated in February 1961.

== Lineage ==
- Constituted as the 33d Reconnaissance Squadron (Heavy) on 28 January 1942.

Activated on 1 March 1942
Redesignated 422d Bombardment Squadron (Heavy) on 22 April 1942
Redesignated 422d Bombardment Squadron, Heavy on 30 August 1943
Inactivated on 25 December 1946
Redesignated 422d Bombardment Squadron, Light on 15 November 1952
Activated on 1 January 1953
Inactivated on 23 March 1954
Redesignated 422d Bombardment Squadron, Medium on 6 October 1958
Activated on 1 January 1959
Discontinued and inactivated on 15 February 1961

=== Assignments ===
- 305th Bombardment Group, 1 March 1942 – 25 December 1946
- 4430th Air Base Wing, 1 January 1953
- Tactical Air Command, 1 May 1953 (attached to 405th Fighter-Bomber Wing)
- Third Air Force, 20 December 1953 (attached to 47th Bombardment Wing)
- 47th Bombardment Group, 8 February – 23 March 1954 (attached to 47th Bombardment Wing)
- 305th Bombardment Wing, 1 January 1959
- 3958th Operational Evaluation and Training Group, 1 October 1959
- 305th Bombardment Wing, 8 March 1960 – 15 February 1961

=== Stations ===
- Salt Lake City Army Air Base, Utah, 1 March 1942
- Geiger Field, Washington, 11 June 1942
- Muroc Army Air Field, California, 4 July – 23 August 1942
- RAF Grafton Underwood (Sta 106), England, 12 September 1942
- RAF Chelveston (Sta 105), England, 11 December 1942
- Sint-Truiden Airfield (A-92) (B-62), Belgium, 25 July 1945
- AAF Station Lechfeld (R-71), Germany, 19 December 1945 – 25 December 1946
- Langley Air Force Base, Virginia, 1 January – 11 December 1953
- RAF Sculthorpe, England, 20 December 1953 – 23 March 1954
- MacDill Air Force Base, Florida, 1 January 1959
- Bunker Hill Air Force Base, Indiana, 1 June 1959
- Carswell Air Force Base, Texas, 1 October 1959
- Bunker Hill Air Force Base, Indiana, 15 March 1960 – 15 February 1961

=== Aircraft ===
- Boeing B-17 Flying Fortress, 1942–1946
- Douglas B-26 Invader, 1953
- North American B-45 Tornado, 1953–1954
- Boeing B-47 Stratojet, 1959

=== Awards and campaigns ===
| Award streamer | Award | Dates | Notes |
|---|---|---|---|
| | Presidential Unit Citation | 4 April 1943 | |

| Campaign Streamer | Campaign | Dates | Notes |
|---|---|---|---|
| | Air Offensive, Europe | 12 September 1942–5 June 1944 | |
| | Air Combat, EAME Theater | 12 September 1942–11 May 1945 | |
| | Normandy | 6 June 1944–24 July 1944 | |
| | Northern France | 25 July 1944–14 September 1944 | |
| | Rhineland | 15 September 1944–21 March 1945 | |
| | Ardennes-Alsace | 16 December 1944–25 January 1945 | |
| | Central Europe | 22 March 1944–21 May 1945 | |
| | World War II Army of Occupation (Germany) | 19 December 1945–25 December 1946 | |
