= 4400th Combat Crew Training Group =

There have been two organizations designated the 4400th Combat Crew Training Group in the United States Air Force:

== B-26 Training ==
On 1 August 1950, Continental Air Command organized the 2215th Combat Crew Training Squadron at Langley Air Force Base, Virginia and assigned it to Tactical Air Command (TAC). The 2215th was organized to provide training on the Douglas B-26 Invader for crews headed for the Korean War. On 1 December 1950 TAC once more became a Major Command and the squadron was redesignated the 4440th Combat Crew Training Squadron.

As the need for trained B-26 crews expanded, the squadron became the 4400th Combat Crew Training Group on 12 March 1951 and was assigned the 4400th Training Squadron and the 4400th Maintenance Squadron. The following month, the federalized 115th, (Note: The 115th and its successor, the 422d were eventually attached to the 47th Bombardment Wing. Maurer, Combat Squadrons, p. 518.) 117th and 122d Bombardment Squadrons of the Air National Guard, flying B-26s were assigned to the group. They were joined by the 115th Bombardment Squadron in December when it was relieved from attachment to the 47th Bombardment Wing. The three National Guard squadrons were returned to state control on 1 January 1953. They were replaced by the regular 423d, and 424th Bombardment Squadrons,

== Special operations training ==
The 4400th Combat Crew Training Group at Hurlburt Field, Florida 20 March 1962 – 27 April 1962.
