= 968th Expeditionary Airborne Air Control Squadron =

968th Expeditionary Airborne Air Control Squadron

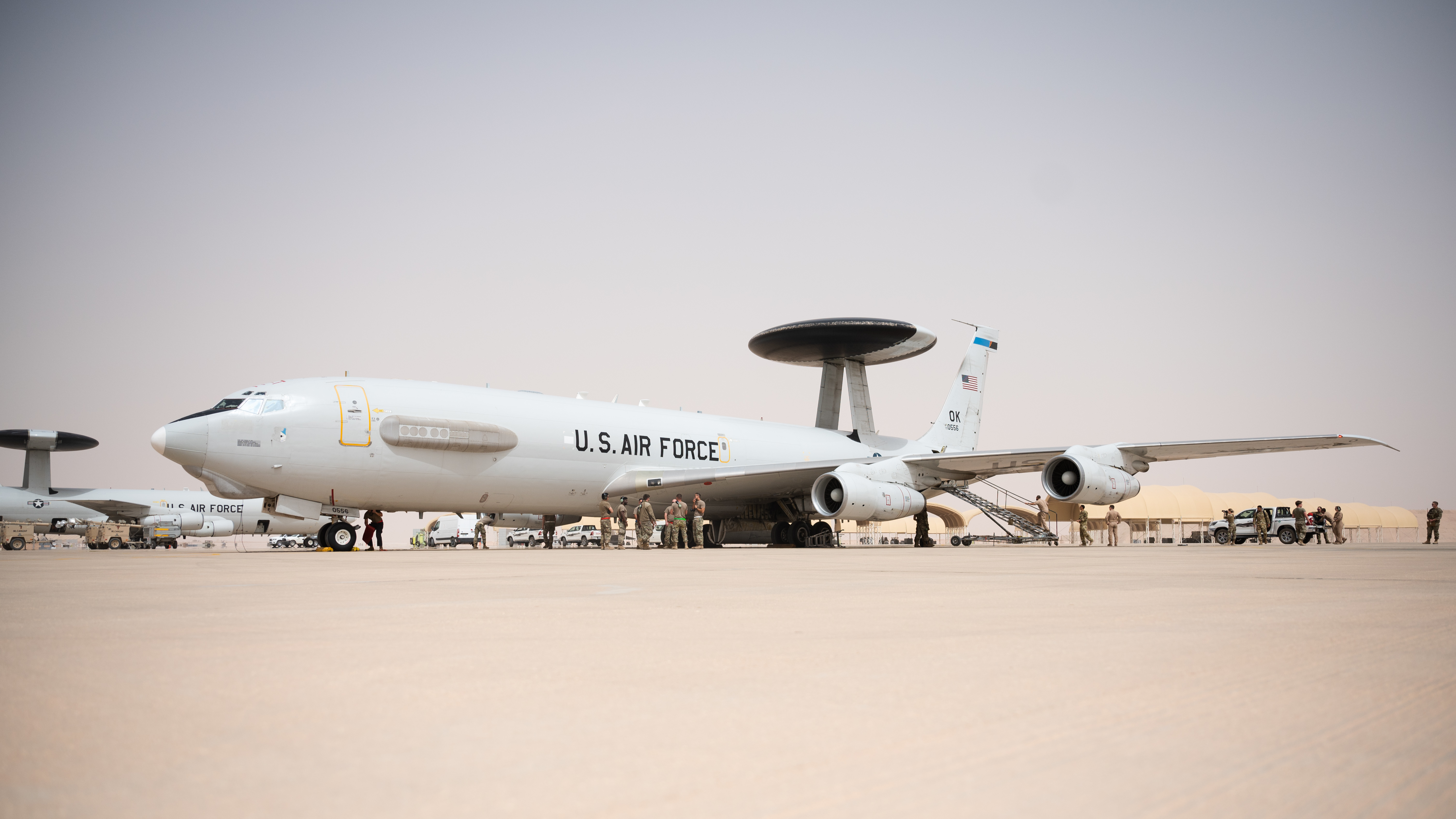
- A squadron E-3G Sentry sits on the flightline at Prince Sultan AB, March 2022
- Active: 1943-1945; 1958–1962; 2002–2003; 2013–present
- Country: United States
- Branch: United States Air Force
- Role: AEW&C
- Part of: Air Combat Command
- Garrison/HQ: Prince Sultan AB, Saudi Arabia
- Engagements: European Theater of Operations
- Decorations: Distinguished Unit Citation; French Croix de Guerre with Palm

Commanders
- Current commander: Lt Col Steven Bailey

Insignia
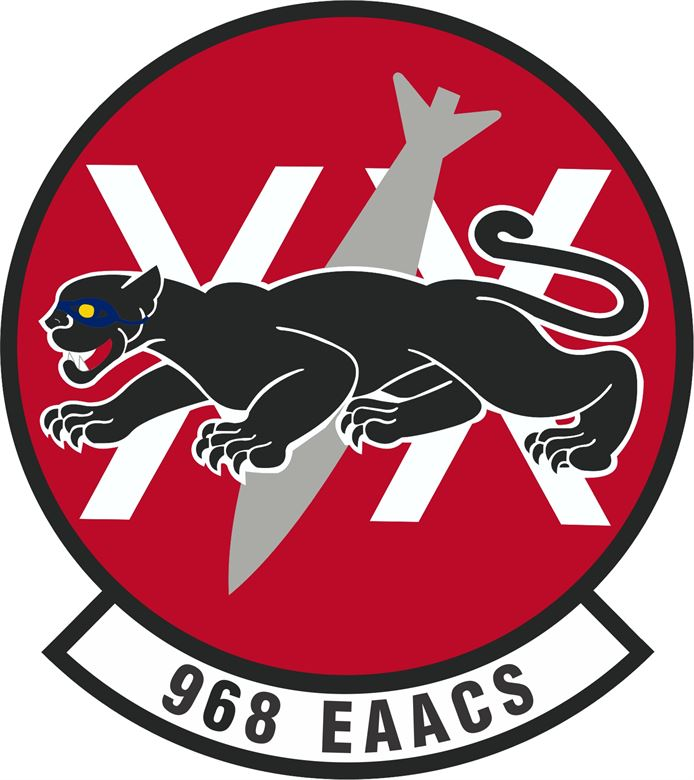
- 968th Expeditionary Air Control Squadron emblem (Note: Approved 18 August 1961.)

The 968th Expeditionary Airborne Air Control Squadron is a provisional unit of the United States Air Force, flying the Boeing E-3G Sentry. Since March 2022, the squadron is stationed at Prince Sultan Air Base, Saudi Arabia. It has been activated twice since the September 11 terrorist attacks.

The first predecessor of the 968th is the 858th Bombardment Squadron, first activated in October 1943 as a Consolidated B-24 Liberator heavy bomber unit. After deploying to England, the squadron entered the strategic bombing campaign against Germany, but was transferred to VIII Composite Command in June 1944, where it replaced the 422d Bombardment Squadron on special operations, dropping propaganda leaflets over Occupied Europe. In August 1944, the 492d Bombardment Group, which had suffered the most severe losses of an Eighth Air Force bomber group was withdrawn from combat 858th began to engage in Operation Carpetbagger, dropping agents and supplies behind German lines, primarily in France. As American forces advanced in France during September 1944, this special operations mission diminished, but operations resumed in Germany during the last months of the war.

The 968th's other predecessor is the 658th Bombardment Squadron, which flew Boeing B-47 Stratojets from 1958 to 1962 during the Cold War. The two squadrons were consolidated in 1985 as the 968th Airborne Warning and Control Squadron, and were converted to provisional status as the 968th Expeditionary Airborne Air Control Squadron in 2002.

== History ==
=== World War II ===
==== Training and strategic bombing ====
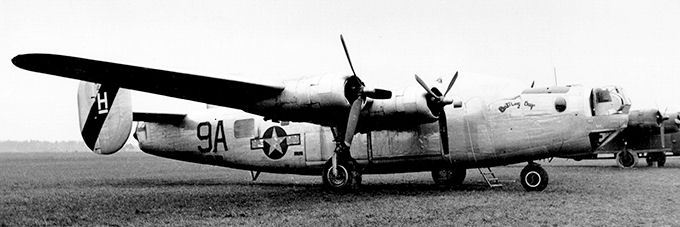
Consolidated B-24 Liberator of the 858th Bombardment Squadron (Note: Aircraft is Consolidated B-24J-150-CO Liberator, serial 44-40159 Battling Boop. This plane landed in Sweden after attacking an airfield at Bremerhaven, Germany on 18 June 1944 and was interned.)

The squadron was first organized in October 1943 at Alamogordo Army Air Field, New Mexico, as one of the original squadrons of the 492d Bombardment Group. Its cadre was drawn from the 859th Bombardment Squadron, a former antisubmarine unit whose mission had transferred to the Navy. By January 1944, most of the ground echelon of the squadron had been used to form other bomber units. 2d Bombardment Division, which controlled VIII Bomber Command's Liberator units in England, began to form a new ground echelon for the squadron from personnel of bomber units already in England, while the air echelon of the 858th continued training at Alamogordo. The air echelon began to depart Alamogordo on 1 April 1944, following the southern ferry route, while the few remaining members of the ground echelon departed on 11 April, sailing on the RMS Queen Elizabeth on 20 April.

On 14 April, the ground echelon that had been formed in England arrived at RAF North Pickenham (Note: Although North Pickenham had been the squadron's nominal station since 1 January, it was actually being assembled at other 2d Bombardment Division stations. Freeman, p. 262.) The air echelon began arriving on 18 April. The squadron flew its first combat mission on 11 May 1944, joining the strategic bombing campaign with attacks primarily on targets in central Germany. During the first week in June, the squadron was diverted from strategic targets to support Operation Overlord by attacking airfields and V-1 flying bomb and V-2 rocket launch sites. It bombed coastal defenses in Normandy on D-Day, 6 June 1944, and continued interdiction attacks until the middle of the month.

==== Special operations ====
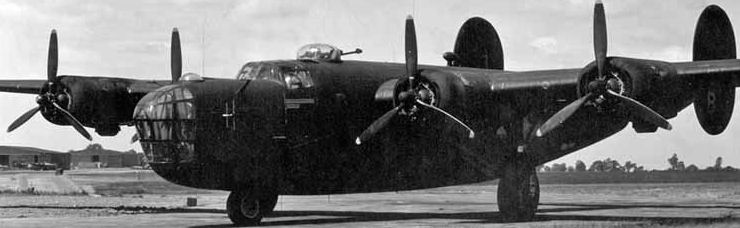
858th Squadron B-24D marked for Carpetbagger operations (Note: Aircraft is Consolidated B-24D-65-CO Liberator, serial 42-40509 "Cookie", Lost on 7 October 1943.)

On 18 June the squadron moved without personnel or equipment, to RAF Cheddington, where it assumed the night leaflet operations that had been performed by the 422d Bombardment Squadron. Only a cadre of the 858th actually transferred, and the squadron was filled out by veterans of the 422d, who joined on 24 June. On leaflet missions, called Nickling, squadron aircraft would fly at high level and drop cardboard canisters with leaflets that would explode at 2–3000 feet above ground level to disperse the materials. The squadron lost one aircraft on these missions. This was the first loss for the Eighth Air Force night leaflet squadron and all ten crewmembers were lost.

The 858th Squadron returned to the 492d Group in early August, but at RAF Harrington, where it assumed the Operation Carpetbagger missions of the 406th Bombardment Squadron, which became the night leaflet squadron in the equivalent of a swap in unit identity. With the 492d Group, the squadron flew 131 Operation Carpetbagger missions by the middle of September. With black-painted aircraft configured with engine flame dampeners and optimized for night operations, the group operated chiefly over France with B-24's and C-47's, transporting agents, supplies, and propaganda leaflets to patriots. As Allied forces moved forward through northern France and into Belgium, the need for Carpetbagger missions decreased and operations ended on 16 September 1944. The squadron's support for the French Resistance earned it the French Croix de Guerre with Palm. With the drawdown of the Carpetbagger mission, the squadron concentrated on hauling gasoline to advancing mechanized forces in France and Belgium. After December 1944, the squadron began limited night bombing operations.

The squadron resumed limited special operations when some of its crews began operations from Dijon Airfield, France on 19 March 1945, flying agents into Germany under the names Operation Red Stocking and Operation Skywave. These operations continued until 26 April 1945. The squadron left England for the United States in July 1945. In August 1945 it began to reform at Kirtland Field, New Mexico as a Boeing B-29 Superfortress very heavy bomb squadron, however it became unnecessary when the Pacific War ended and it was inactivated on 17 October 1945.

=== Strategic Air Command ===
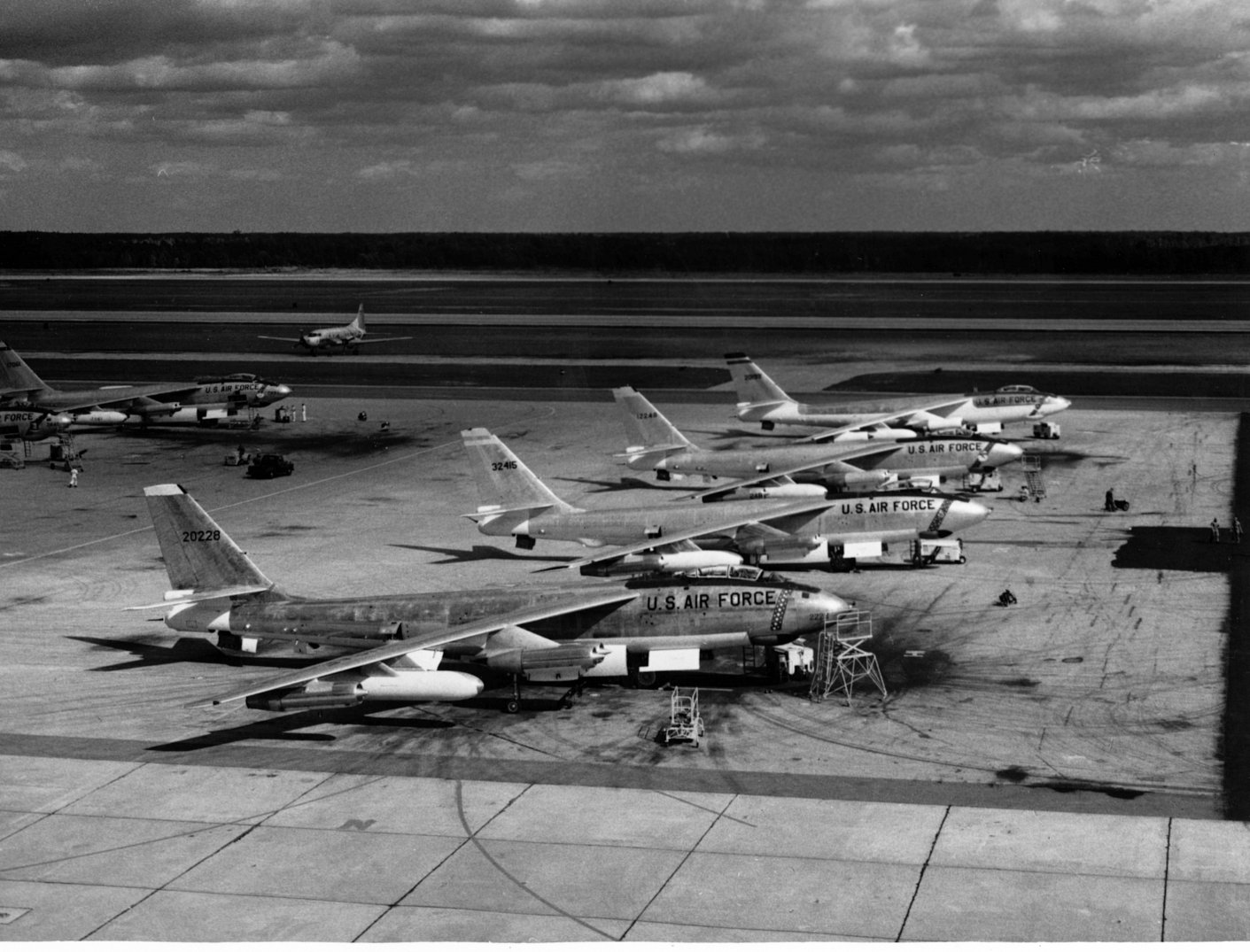
B-47s of Strategic Air Command

From 1958, the Boeing B-47 Stratojet wings of Strategic Air Command (SAC) began to assume an alert posture at their home bases, reducing the amount of time spent on alert at overseas bases. The SAC alert cycle divided itself into four parts: planning, flying, alert and rest to meet General Thomas S. Power’s initial goal of maintaining one third of SAC's planes on fifteen minute ground alert, fully fueled and ready for combat to reduce vulnerability to a Soviet missile strike. To implement this new system, B-47 wings reorganized from three to four squadrons. The 658th Bombardment Squadron was activated at Mountain Home Air Force Base as the fourth squadron of the 9th Bombardment Wing. The SAC alert commitment was increased to half the wing's aircraft in 1962 and the four squadron pattern no longer met the alert cycle commitment, so the squadron was inactivated on 1 January 1962.

In September 1985, the 858th Bombardment Squadron and the 658th Bombardment Squadron were consolidated as the 968th Airborne Warning and Control Squadron.

=== Expeditionary Operations ===
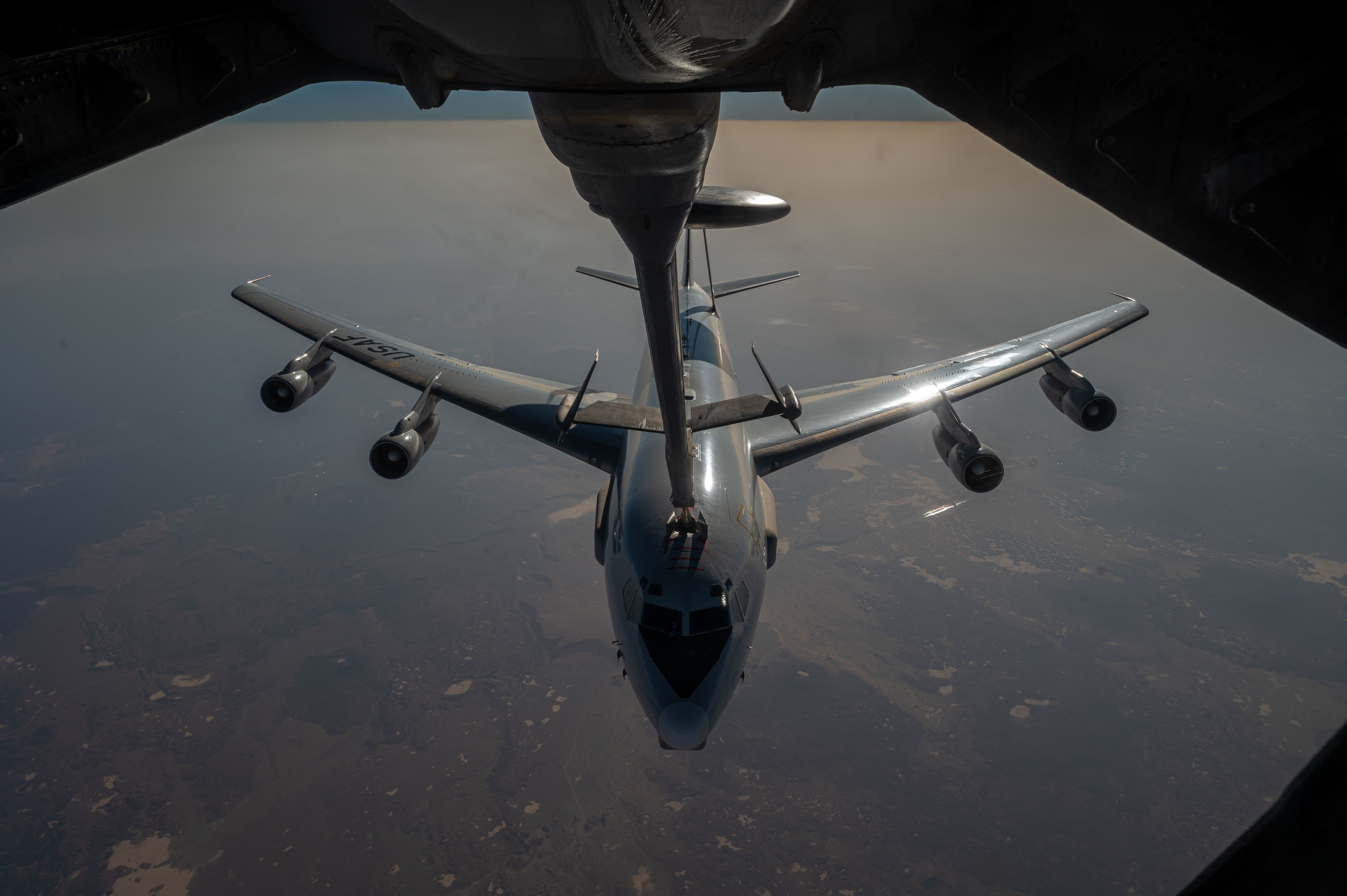
A 968th EAACS E-3G Sentry conducts air refueling during Exercise Red Sands, June 2022

The 968th was converted to provisional status and redesignated the 968th Expeditionary Airborne Air Control Squadron in late January 2002. It was assigned to Air Combat Command (ACC) to activate or inactivate as needed. ACC activated the squadron at Thumrait Air Base, Oman and equipped it with the Boeing E-3 Sentry in December to provided early warning of enemy activity and to control friendly aircraft over the Gulf area in December 2002, inactivating it in May 2003.

It was again activated with the E-3 to provide airborne warning and air control in 2013, when it replaced the 963d Expeditionary Airborne Air Control Squadron at Al Dhafra Air Base, United Arab Emirates. The 963d was the last of several units that had rotated to perform the warning and control mission at Al Dhafra, but United States Air Forces Central Command believed that keeping an enduring unit there would provide greater stability to Operation Inherent Resolve missions. On 21 November 2015, the squadron flew the first combat mission using the E-3G Block 40/45, equipped with upgraded hardware and software.

In February 2020, the 968th EAACS surpassed 50,000 combat flying hours since being activated seven years prior, of which 36,360 hours were spent "on-station" supporting operations in Afghanistan, Iraq, Syria and the Persian Gulf.

In March 2022, the squadron relocated to Prince Sultan Air Base, Saudi Arabia after having spent 9 years at Al Dhafra.

== Lineage ==
858th Bombardment Squadron

- Constituted as the 858th Bombardment Squadron, Heavy on 14 September 1943

Activated on 1 October 1943
Redesignated 858th Bombardment Squadron, Very Heavy on 5 August 1945
Inactivated on 17 October 1945

- Consolidated with the 658th Bombardment Squadron as the 968th Airborne Warning and Control Squadron on 19 September 1985

968th Expeditionary Airborne Air Control Squadron

- Constituted as the 658th Bombardment Squadron, Medium on 11 August 1958

Activated on 1 October 1958
Discontinued, and inactivated on 1 January 1962

- Consolidated with the 858th Bombardment Squadron as the 968th Airborne Warning and Control Squadron on 19 September 1985
- Redesignated 968th Expeditionary Airborne Air Control Squadron and converted to provisional status, on 25 January 2002

Activated on 13 December 2002
Inactivated on 22 May 2003
Activated on 20 February 2013

=== Assignments ===
- 492d Bombardment Group, 1 October 1943
- VIII Air Force Composite Command, 19 June 1944
- 492d Bombardment Group, 5 August 1944 – 17 October 1945
- 9th Bombardment Wing, 1 October 1958 – 1 January 1962
- Air Combat Command to activate or inactivate as needed after 25 January 2002

405th Expeditionary Operations Group, 13 December 2002 – 22 May 2003
380th Expeditionary Operations Group, 26 February 2013 – present

=== Stations ===
- Alamogordo Army Air Field, New Mexico, 1 October 1943
- RAF North Pickenham (Station 143), England, 1 January 1944
- RAF Cheddington (Station 113), England, 19 June 1944
- RAF Harrington (Station 179), England, 10 August 1944
- Sioux Falls Army Air Field, South Dakota, 14 August 1945
- Kirtland Field, New Mexico, 17 August-17 October 1945.
- Mountain Home Air Force Base, Idaho, 1 October 1958 – 1 January 1962
- Thumrait Air Base, Oman, 13 December 2002 – 22 May 2003
- Al Dhafra Air Base, United Arab Emirates, 26 February 2013 – March 2022
- Prince Sultan Air Base, Saudi Arabia, March 2022 – present

=== Aircraft ===
- Consolidated B-24 Liberator, 1943–1945
- Douglas C-47 Skytrain, 1944–1945
- Douglas A-26 Invader, 1945
- de Havilland Mosquito, 1945
- Boeing B-47 Stratojet, 1958–1962
- Boeing E-3 Sentry, 2002–2003, 2013–present

=== Awards and campaigns ===
Award streamer	Award	Dates	Notes
	Distinguished Unit Citation	20 March 1945-25 April 1945	(German Occupied Territory) 858th Bombardment Squadron
	Air Force Meritorious Unit Award	26 February 2013-19 June 2013	968th Expeditionary Airborne Air Control Squadron
	Air Force Meritorious Unit Award	1 July 2014-30 June 2015	968th Expeditionary Airborne Air Control Squadron
	French Croix de Guerre with Palm	6 August 1944-16 September 1944	858th Bombardment Squadron

Campaign Streamer	Campaign	Dates	Notes
	Air Offensive, Europe	1 January 1944 – 5 June 1944	858th Bombardment Squadron
	Air Combat, EAME Theater	1 January 1944 – 11 May 1945	858th Bombardment Squadron
	Central Europe	22 March 1944 – 21 May 1945	858th Bombardment Squadron
	Normandy	6 June 1944 – 24 July 1944	858th Bombardment Squadron
	Northern France	25 July 1944 – 14 September 1944	858th Bombardment Squadron
	Southern France	15 August 1944 – 14 September 1944	858th Bombardment Squadron
	Rhineland	15 September 1944 – 21 March 1945	858th Bombardment Squadron
	Global War on Terror Expeditionary Medal		968th Expeditionary Airborne Air Control Squadron

== See also ==
- List of A-26 Invader operators
- B-24 Liberator units of the United States Army Air Forces
- List of Douglas C-47 Skytrain operators
