= 380th Expeditionary Operations Group =

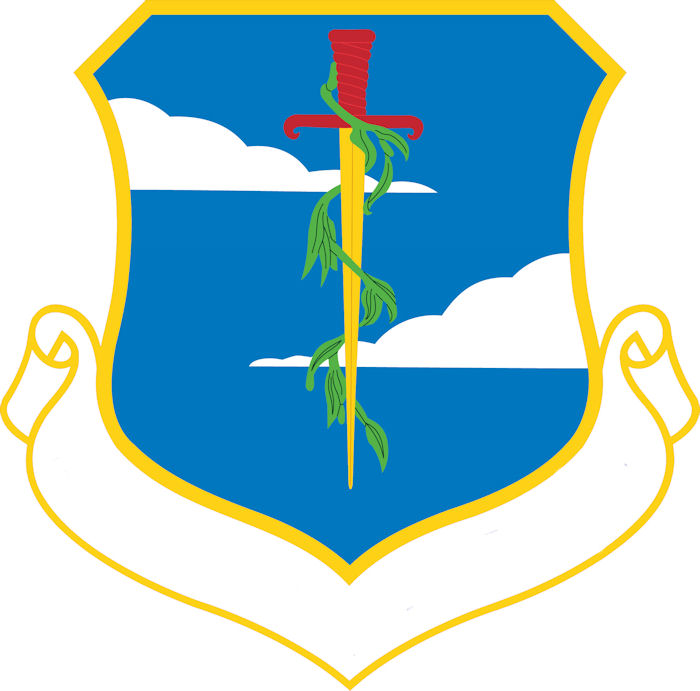
- Emblem of the 380th Expeditionary Operations Group
- Active: 1991–1994; 2002–present
- Country: United States
- Branch: United States Air Force

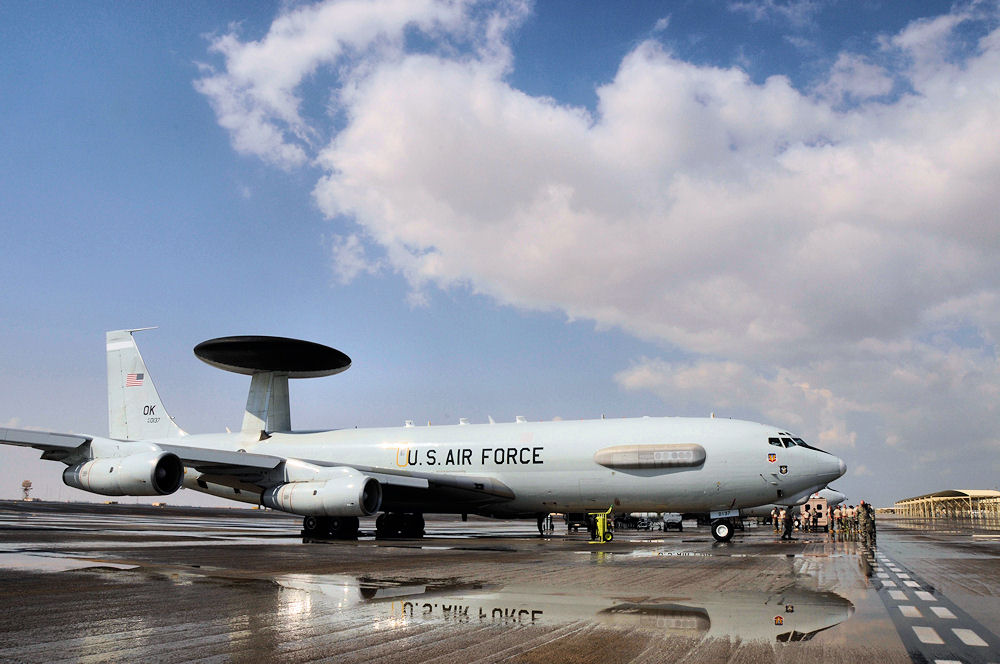
Boeing E-3B Sentry (80-0137) from Tinker AFB, Oklahoma attached to the 968th Expeditionary Airborne Air Control Squadron

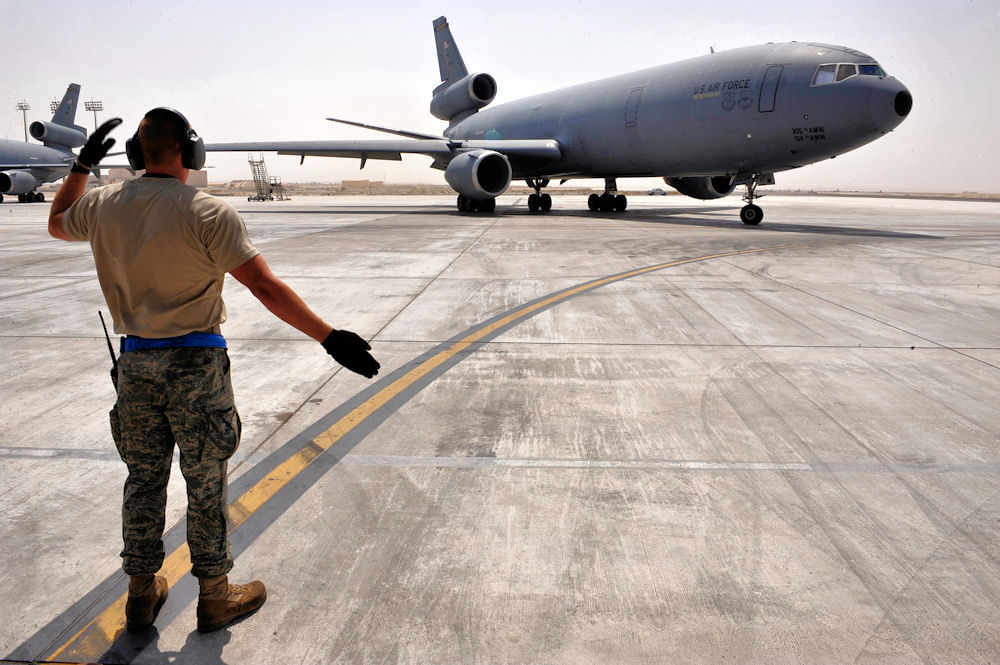
McDonnell Douglas KC-10 Extender (85-0034) from McGuire AFB, New Jersey attached to the 908th Expeditionary Air Refueling Squadron

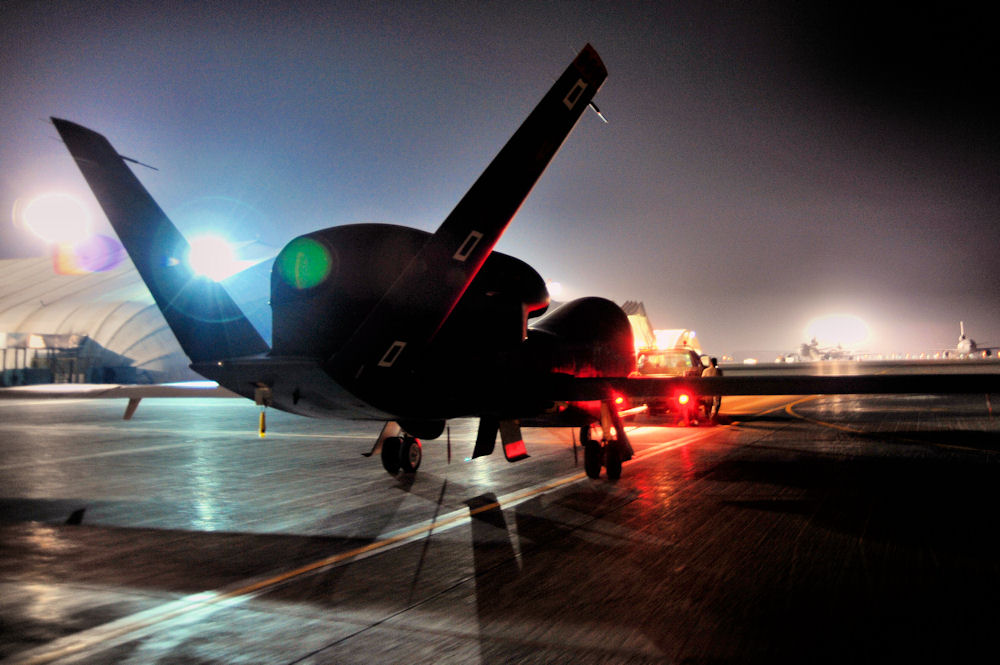
RQ-4 Global Hawk from Beale AFB, California attached to the 12th Expeditionary Reconnaissance Squadron

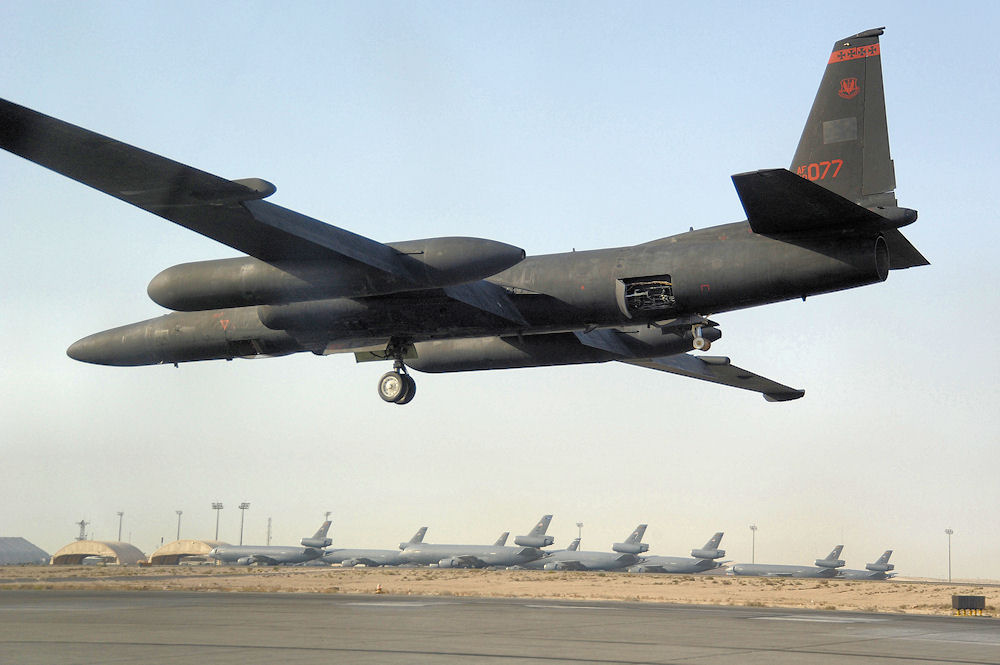
Lockheed U-2S nicknamed Dragon Lady (80–1077) attached to the 99th Expeditionary Reconnaissance Squadron

The 380th Expeditionary Operations Group) is the operational flying component of the United States Air Force 380th Air Expeditionary Wing. It is a provisional unit stationed at Al Dhafra Air Base, United Arab Emirates, and is assigned to the United States Air Forces Central component of Air Combat Command.

The unit was first activated in 1991 at Plattsburgh Air Force Base, New York as the 380th Wing's operational element. It managed the wing's tankers until the fall of 1994, when flying operations at Plattsburgh ended in preparation for the base's closure in response to the 1993 BRAC recommendations

== Overview ==
The 380 EOG conducts combat air refueling, airborne C2, and ISR in a joint and coalition environment. Its component squadrons are:

- Detachment 1
- 380th Expeditionary Operations Support Squadron
- 908th Expeditionary Air Refueling Squadron (KC-10 Extender)
- 968th Expeditionary Airborne Air Control Squadron (E-3 Sentry)
- Expeditionary Fighter Squadron (F-15C)
  - 159th Expeditionary Fighter Squadron, Florida Air National Guard, from Jacksonville International Airport, FL.
- Expeditionary Fighter Squadron (F-15E)
  - 336th Expeditionary Fighter Squadron from Seymour Johnson Air Force Base (June 2019 – November 2019)
  - 494th Expeditionary Fighter Squadron from RAF Lakenheath (October 2019 – 2020)
- Expeditionary Fighter Squadron (F-22A)
  - 94th Expeditionary Fighter Squadron from Joint Base Langley–Eustis
- Expeditionary Fighter Squadron (F-35)
  - 4th Expeditionary Fighter Squadron from Hill Air Force Base (April 2019 -)

== History ==
The group was activated at Plattsburgh Air Force Base, New York and assigned to the 380th Air Refueling Wing in 1991. This was because Strategic Air Command (SAC) was reorganizing its wings under the Objective Wing Organization. When it was disestablished the following year, the group became part of Air Mobility Command. This assignment did not last long, for the 1993 Base Realignment and Closure Commission recommended the closure of Plattsburgh AFB and the group was inactivated in October 1994.

The group was reactivated and redesignated as the 380th Expeditionary Operations Group in early 2002 to support the War in Afghanistan. The group participated in Operation Enduring Freedom focused on Afghanistan; and the Iraq War from 2003, including the Iraqi Civil War (2014–2017), which the U.S. Department of Defense codenamed Operation Iraqi Freedom and Operation New Dawn.

=== Lineage ===
- Established as the 380th Operations Group on 29 August 1991

Activated on 1 September 1991
Inactivated on 1 October 1994

- Redesignated 380th Expeditionary Operations Group and converted to provisional status on 4 December 2001
- Redesignated as 380th Expeditionary Operations Group in early 2002 and activated.

=== Assignments ===
- 380th Air Refueling Wing, 1 September 1991 – 1 October 1994
- Air Combat Command to activate or inactivate as needed after 4 December 2001

380th Air Expeditionary Wing, c. January 2002–present

=== Units ===
- 12th Expeditionary Reconnaissance Squadron: 2002-Undetermined
- 908th Expeditionary Air Refueling Squadron: 2002-Undetermined
- 964th Expeditionary Airborne Air Control Squadron: 2002-Undetermined
- 99th Expeditionary Reconnaissance Squadron: 2002-Undetermined
- 380th Expeditionary Operations Support Squadron: 2002-Undetermined

=== Stations ===
- Plattsburgh Air Force Base, New York, 1 September 1991 – 1 October 1994
- Al Dhafra Air Base, United Arab Emirates, c. January 2002 – present

=== Aircraft ===
- KC-135R/T Stratotanker, 1991–1994, 2002-Undetermined
- KC-10A Extender, 2002-Undetermined
