= Fire suppression =

Fire suppression may refer to:

- Firefighting
- Fire suppression systems
- Wildfire suppression
