= 115th Airlift Squadron =

115th Airlift Squadron

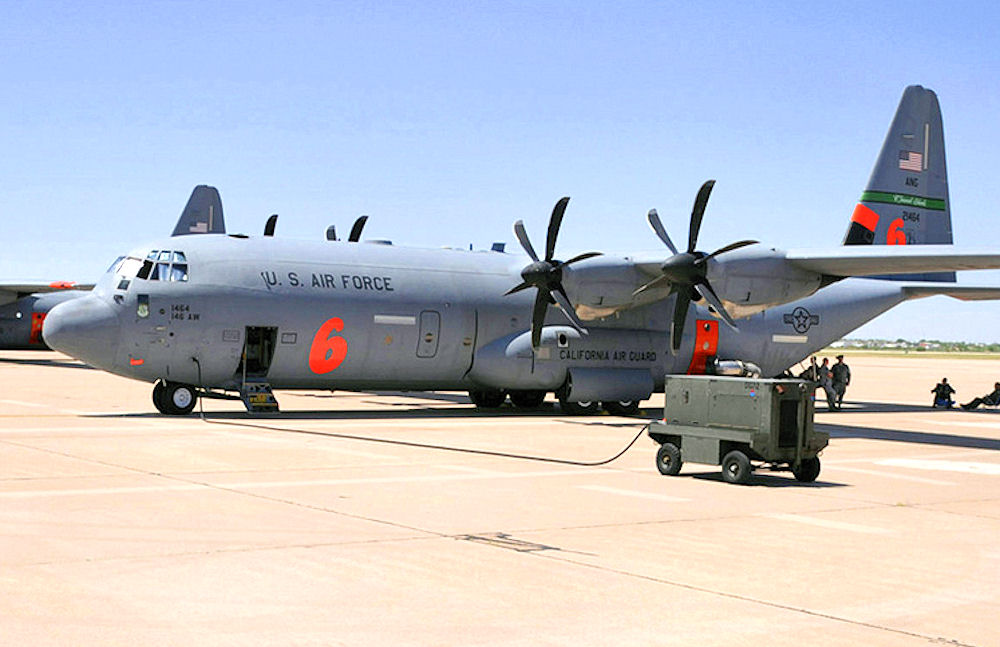
- 146th Airlift Wing C-130J-30 before a Modular Airborne Firefighting System mission.
- Active: 1917–1919; 1924–1945; 1946–1953; 1953–1970; 1970–present
- Country: United States
- Allegiance: California
- Branch: Air National Guard
- Type: Squadron
- Role: Airlift
- Part of: California Air National Guard
- Garrison/HQ: Channel Islands Air National Guard Station, California
- Engagements: World War II; China-Burma-India Theater

Insignia
- 115th Airlift Squadron emblem

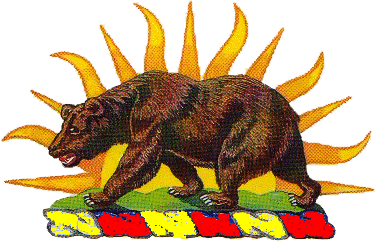
- 115th Observation Squadron emblem (Note: Approved 26 December 1929.)
- Tail stripe: Red, "Channel Islands" in white

The 115th Airlift Squadron is a unit of the California Air National Guard's 146th Airlift Wing located at Channel Islands Air National Guard Station, California. The 115th is equipped with the C-130J Hercules.

The 115th is the oldest unit in the California Air National Guard, having almost 90 years of service to the state and nation. It is a descendant organization of the World War I 115th Aero Squadron, established on 28 August 1917. It was reformed on 16 June 1924, as the 115th Observation Squadron, and is one of the 29 original National Guard Observation Squadrons of the United States Army National Guard formed before World War II.

== History ==
=== World War I ===
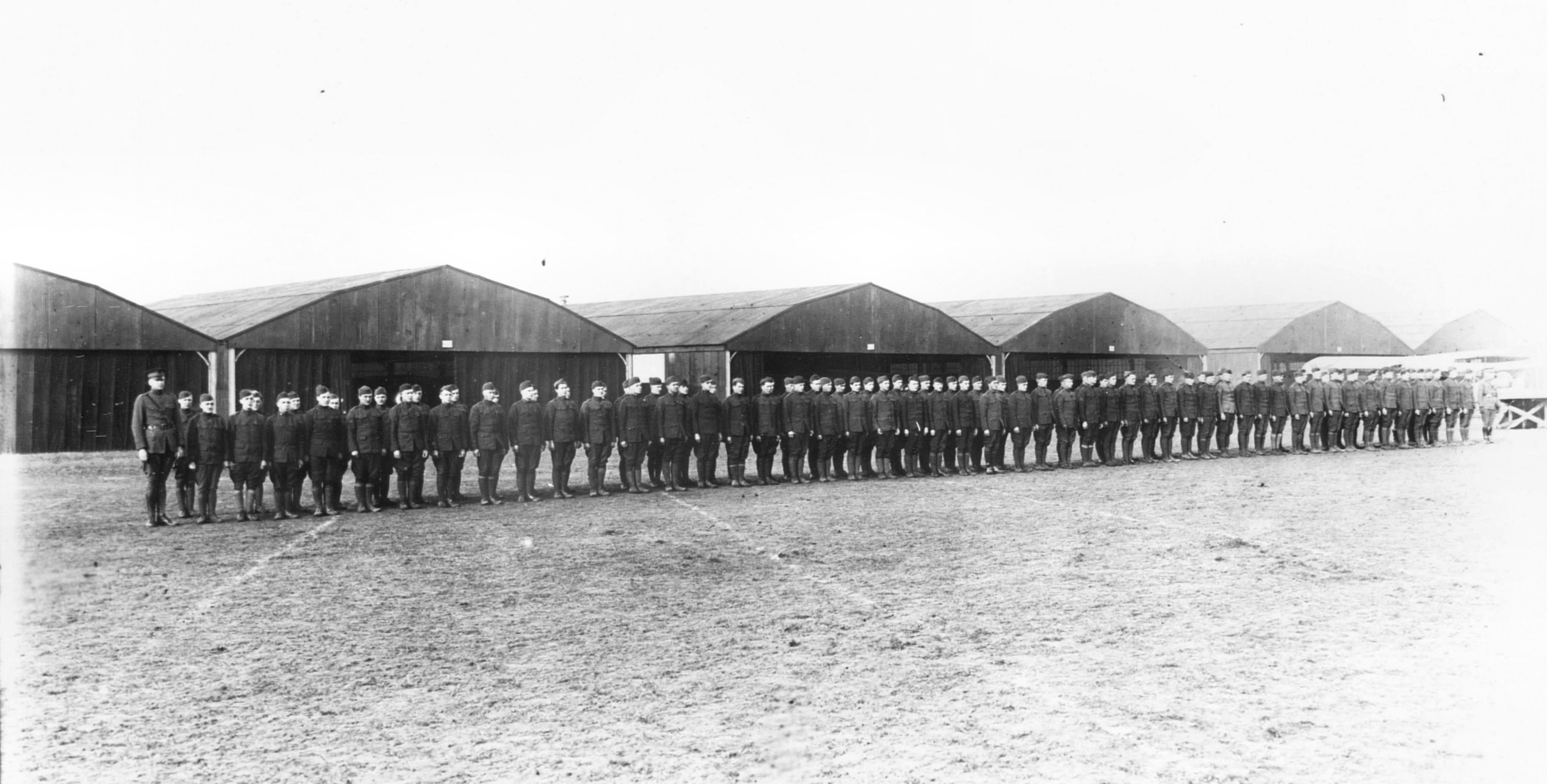
115th Aero Squadron, Second Aviation Instruction Center Tours Aerodrome, France, November 1918.

The 115th Airlift Squadron traces its origins to the 115th Aero Squadron, organized at Kelly Field, Texas on 28 August 1917. It was formed from three groups of recruits, one from Fort McDowell, Santa Rosa, California, made up of men from the Pacific Coast states. The second group came from Fort Bliss, Texas, made up of men from Texas, Arizona and New Mexico. The third, and largest group reported from Jefferson Barracks, St. Louis, Missouri, and with it came recruits from the Mississippi Valley. At Kelly Field, the recruits were indoctrinated into the ways and means of the Army. Orders for the unit to serve overseas were received on 14 October, and with five other squadrons, the 115th departed on 31 October for the Aviation Concentration Center, Garden City, Long Island, arriving on 31 October. It was there that final arrangements were made for the trip overseas, complete equipment was drawn and a final few transfers were made. On 3 December, orders were issued for the 115th to move to the New York Port of Embarkation, Hoboken, New Jersey, where the men boarded the SS Huron, an impressed German ship that was used as a troop transport. After an uneventful cross-Atlantic voyage, the squadron arrived at St. Nazarire, France, on 20 December. The squadron was moved to a troop train and headed immediately for Tours Aerodrome, in central France.

At Tours, the 115th was assigned to the Second Aviation Instruction Center as a supply squadron. The men were assigned to warehouse duties, storing new equipment and all manner of supplies that arrived at the center, and issuing and delivering the necessities of operating the center to the various units and divisions of the station. The squadron was tasked in maintaining accurate inventory records and advising the Commander of shortages and ordering additional or new equipment from Depots in France. The 115th was also responsible for the operation of the various mess halls, with squadron members acting as cooks, bakers and performing dish washing duties.

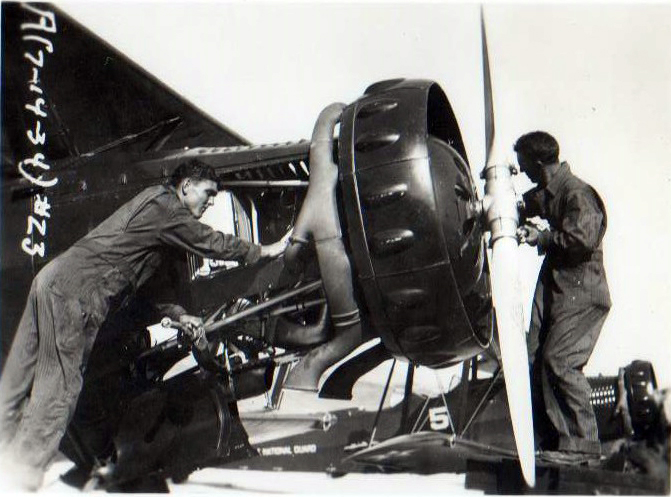
Maintenance on a Douglas O-38s from the 115th Observation Squadron

After the signing of the Armistice with Germany on 11 November, some men of the squadron were assigned to transportation and convoy duty, driving trucks performing collection of equipment from front-line units and also moving personnel back from the lines. The 636th Aero Squadron (renamed 1 February 1918) returned to the United States in late March 1919. It arrived at Mitchel Field, New York, where the squadron members were demobilized and returned to civilian life.

=== California National Guard ===
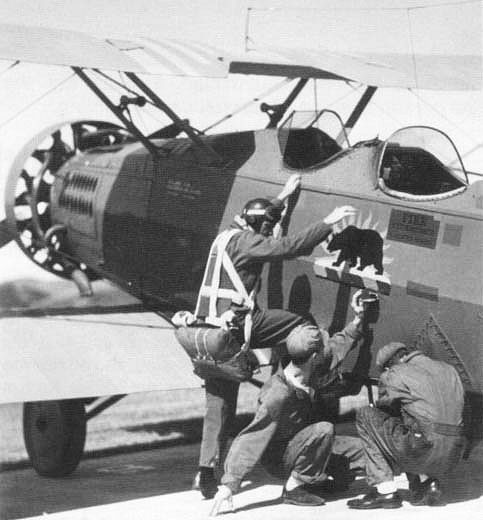
115th Observation Squadron Douglas O-38 Preparing for a target towing mission at Camp Merriam in 1933

Established on 5 April 1924, which authorized the immediate organization of the 115th Observation Squadron, 40th Division Aviation, California National Guard. Initially the Unit held its meetings at Clover Field, Santa Monica, using reserve equipment planes for flying. Later on, the Squadron met at the National Guard Armory and also at the University of Southern California. In 1925, several months after its organization, the Squadron moved to permanent quarters at Griffith Park Aviation Field in Los Angeles.

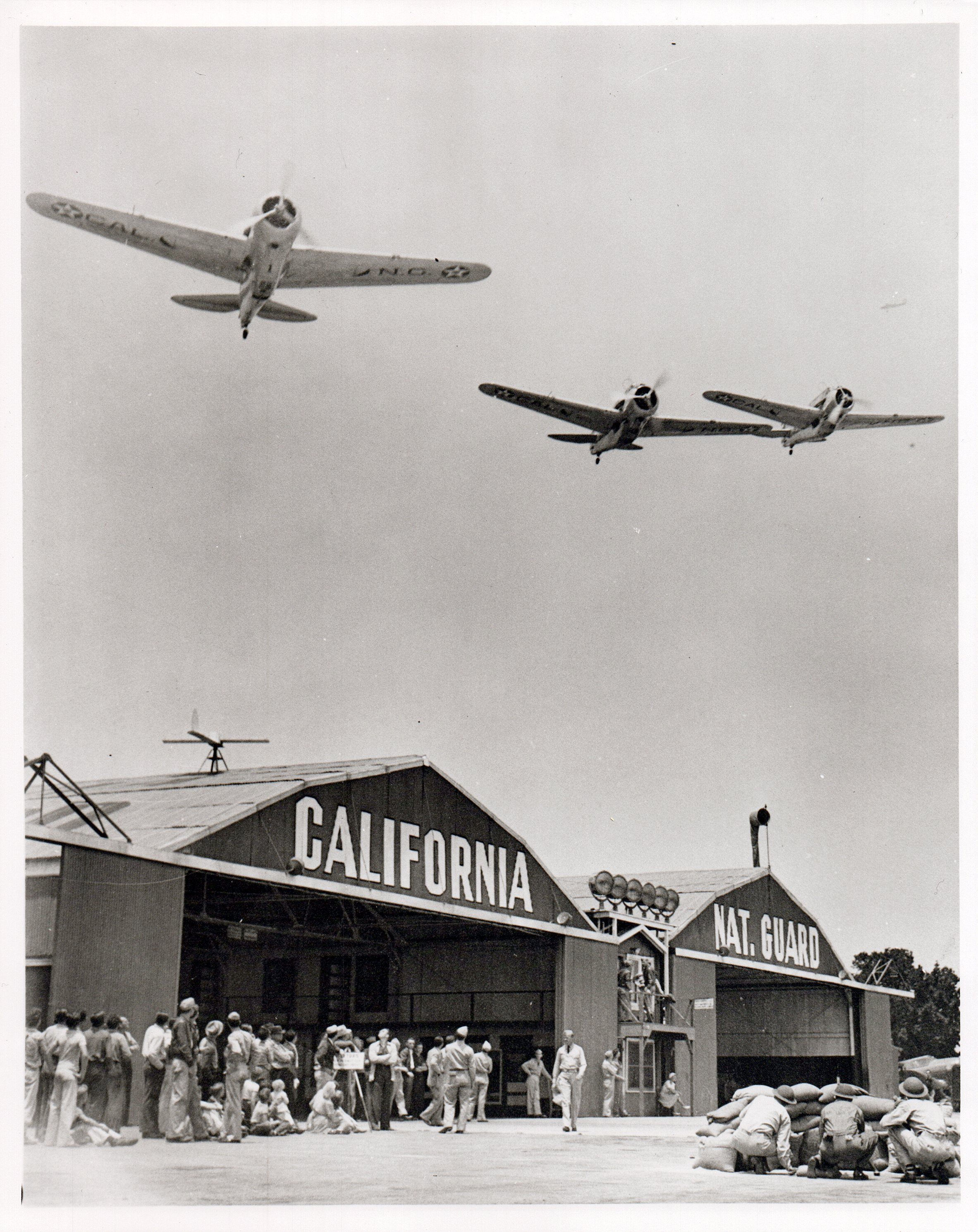
O-47's of the 115th Observation Squadron fly over Griffith Park Airfield during their Open House, 6 June 1940.

On 3 June 1931, the 115th Squadron participated in the National Air Corps maneuvers. Each airplane of the 115th Squadron that participated in the maneuvers had flown approximately one hundred hours including time from Griffith Park Aerodrome to Wright Field, Dayton, Ohio, and return. Chief of Staff of the United States Army, General Douglas MacArthur, commended the officers of the Aviation unit of the California National Guard, for the efficient manner in which they performed the work that was assigned to them during the National Air exercises at Dayton. The unit demonstrated a high degree of training and morale which placed them on an equal footing with the National Air Corps.

=== World War II ===
In 1941, the 115th Squadron was federalized into the United States Army Air Corps, assigned to the Fourth Air Force and sent to Sherwood Field, Paso Robles in northern San Luis Obispo County. The field was named for Captain George Sherwood, the first commander of the 115th. Sherwood was killed in 1935 while flying civilian mail near Burbank, ironically crash-landing in a cemetery. The squadron was the first military group to occupy Sherwood Field. The 115th included many photographers from southern California, some associated with the movie industry in civilian life. Sometimes Hollywood starlets would be brought to Paso Robles to entertain the troops. After the Japanese Attack on Pearl Harbor, the 115th flew antisubmarine patrol missions along the California coastline from several airfields in southern California.

Moved to Laurel Army Air Field, Mississippi in November 1942 and began training for combat reconnaissance duties, later becoming an Operational Training Unit (OTU). Deployed to the China-Burma-India Theater, becoming part of Tenth Air Force in India during November 1944. Redesignated the 115th Liaison Squadron, performed liaison and light reconnaissance flights over eastern India and Burma for American and British ground forces, then being reassigned to Fourteenth Air Force in China during July 1945. Continued flights over western China until the Japanese surrender in August, remained in China until October 1945 when the 115th returned to India and was demobilized.

=== California Air National Guard ===
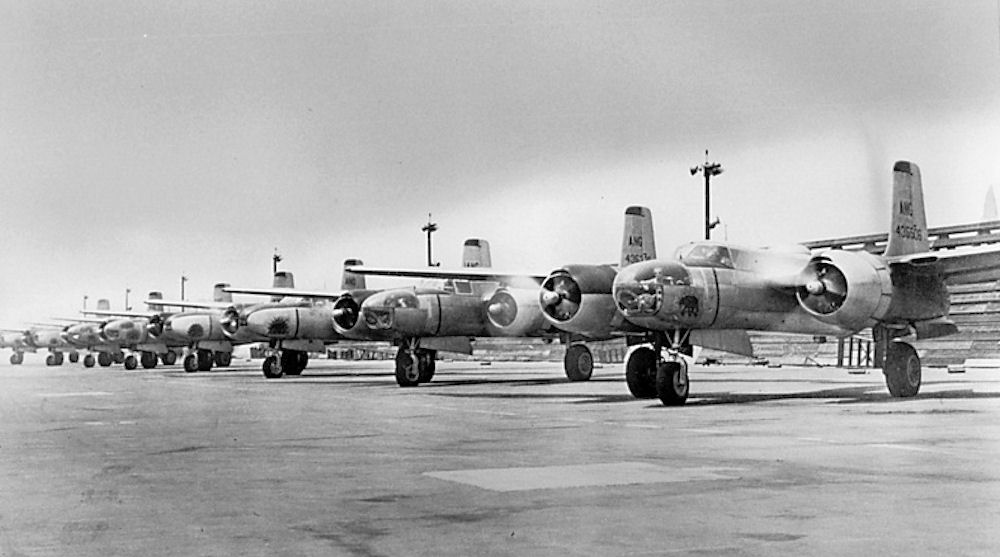
115th Bombardment Squadron B-26 Invaders, 1947

A few months after being inactivated, the 115th Liaison Squadron was reactivated and redesignated the 115th Bombardment Squadron (Light). It returned to California state control on 24 May 1946. It was organized at Van Nuys Airport, California on 16 September 1946. The 115th Bombardment Squadron was equipped with A-26 Invaders and in 1950 was assigned to the 146th Composite Group, also at Van Nuys Airport by the National Guard Bureau.

As part of the Continental Air Command Fourth Air Force, the squadron trained for tactical bombing missions and air-to-air combat. The unit was called to active federal service on 1 March 1951 for duty in the Korean War. It was sent to Langley Air Force Base, Virginia, and became a Tactical Air Command training squadron for pilots flying the B-45A Tornado jet bomber. It was released from active federal duty and returned to California state control on 1 January 1953.

==== Air defense ====
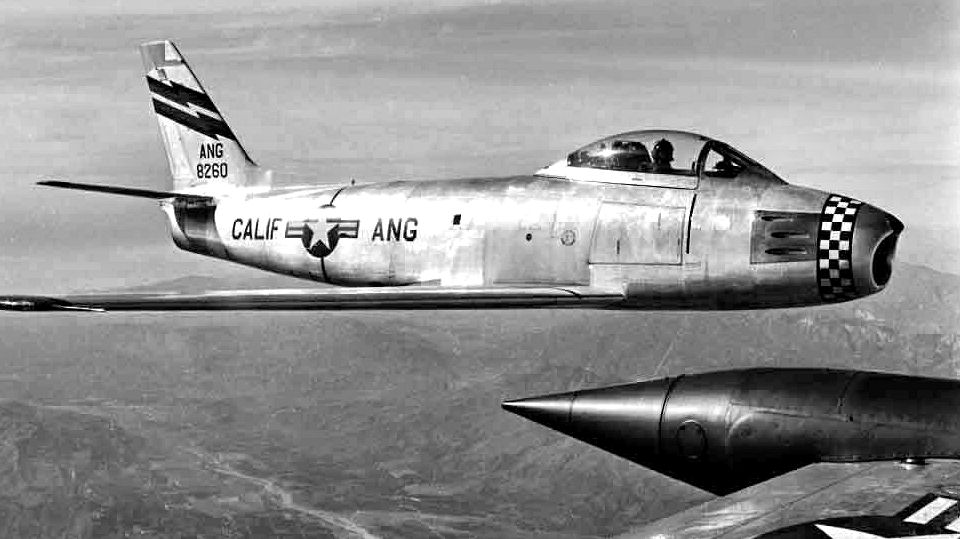
115th FIS North American F-86A Sabre 48–260, 1955

After the Korean War, the squadron was equipped with the long-range F-51H Mustang and became a part of Air Defense Command. In February 1954, it was equipped with F-86A Sabre jet interceptors. By July 1955 the transition from the F-51H Mustang to the F-86A Sabre was complete. The squadron was redesignated the 115th Fighter-Interceptor Squadron with an air defense mission for the Los Angeles area. During the 1950s, the squadron received newer F-86F Sabres in 1957 and later F-86H Sabre day interceptors in 1959.

==== Strategic airlift ====
In 1960, the 115th's parent 146th Air Transport Wing was reassigned to Military Air Transport Service, trading in its Sabre interceptors for 4-engine C-97 Stratofreighter transports. With air transportation recognized as a critical wartime need, the unit was re-designated the 146th Air Transport Wing (Heavy). During the Berlin Crisis the 115th was federalized on 1 October 1961. From Van Nuys, the 115th augmented MATS airlift capability worldwide in support of the Air Force's needs. It returned again to California state control on 31 August 1962. Throughout the 1960s, the unit flew long-distance transport missions in support of Air Force requirements, frequently sending aircraft to Hawaii, Japan, the Philippines, and during the Vietnam War, to both South Vietnam, Okinawa and Thailand.

==== Tactical airlift ====
The C-97s were retired in 1970 and the unit was transferred to Tactical Air Command. It transitioned to the C-130A Hercules theater transport, flying missions in support of TAC throughout the United States and Alaska. In 1973 the C-130A models were transferred to the Republic of Vietnam Air Force and they were replaced by the C-130B. During this period, both the 115th and its sister squadron, the 195th Tactical Airlift Squadron shared the same pool of aircraft.

With the end of the Vietnam War, the California National Guard bureau decided to downsize the 146th Tactical Airlift Wing. With C-130s units being transferred to Military Airlift Command, the junior 195th Tactical Airlift Squadron was inactivated on 30 September 1974. The personnel, equipment and aircraft of the 195th TFS were reassigned to the 115th TAS.

In the early 1970s, USAF's "Total Force" policy brought the wing into full partnership with its Air Force counterparts by mandating co-operation and teamwork between Air Guard and active duty Air Force units in all phases of military airlift operations. As a result, in succeeding years the wing's C-130s traveled to all corners of the world, airlifting troops, passengers, and cargo during training missions, exercise deployments, and real-world military operations to support Federal and State military airlift requirements.

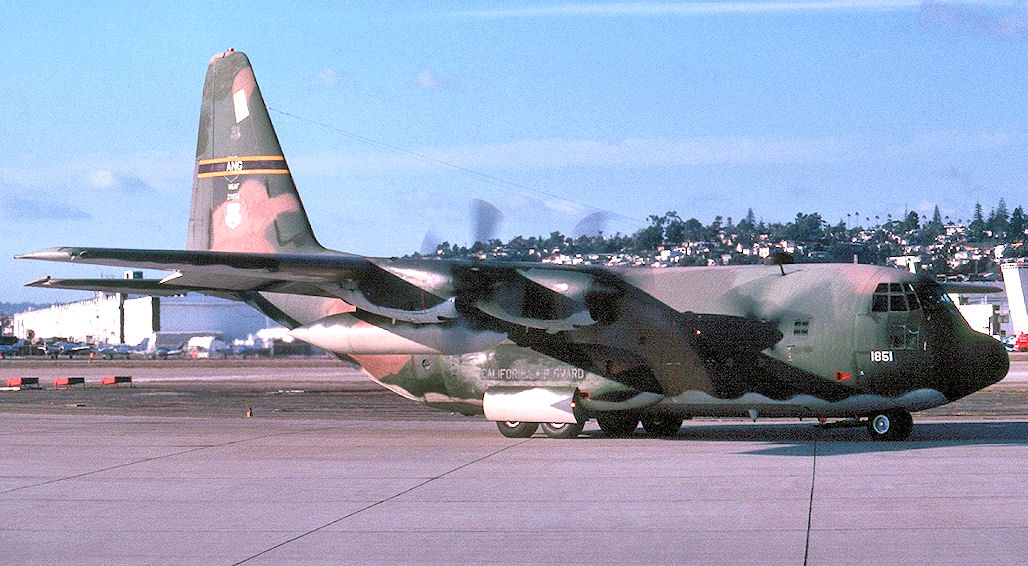
115th TAS C-130E Hercules 62-1851 about 1981

The 146th is one of only four C-130 Air Guard and AF Reserve units whose contribution to the nation's aerial fire fighting capability includes equipment and techniques for efficient, effective suppression of large wildland fires from the air. Since 1974, using the Modular Airborne Fire Fighting System (MAFFS) units supplied by the U.S. Forest Service and mounted in four C-130s, the wing's aerial fire fighting crews have been credited with saving many lives and countless millions of dollars' worth of structures, forests, and brush land in California, and many other States and countries as well, taking part in over 5,000 aerial firefighting missions in California and across the Western United States saving valuable property, natural resources, and lives. The fire seasons of 1993 and 1994 were the worst on record. The Malibu fires of 1993 literally burned to the edge of the 146th AW's base. But it was in 1994, with over 55,000 wildfires raging throughout the western States, that the 146th, along with three other MAFFS-equipped guard and reserve units flew nearly 2,000 missions, dropping fifty-one million pounds of fire retardant.

The squadron participated in numerous Cold War military exercises such as Team Spirit, Volant Oak, Red Flag, and Reforger. Other Joint Chief of Staff exercises included Ember Dawn IV in Alaska and Brave Shield in Europe. In 1979, the Air National Guard and Air Force Reserve assumed full responsibility for airlift operations in Panama, which recently moved to Puerto Rico, a commitment still fulfilled.

In mid-December 1989, and continuing for several weeks, wing aircraft, air crews, and support personnel on deployment for exercise Volant Oak at Howard Air Force Base, Panama Canal Zone flew combat airlift missions for U.S. Southern Command during Operation Just Cause in Panama. More than 100 combat sorties were flown by 146th aircraft and crews, with no casualties or damage to aircraft.

In December 1988, after more than six decades of Air National Guard flying tradition in the San Fernando Valley, the 146th Airlift Wing began moving from Van Nuys to a brand new facility, built on Federal land leased to the State of California, adjacent to the Naval Air Warfare Center Weapons Division, an active duty Navy flying installation. The 146th operates from the military airfield at the Naval Air Warfare Center Weapons Division, along with Navy and other Federal aviation activities. By March 1990, all but a small remnant of wing personnel had transferred operations to Channel Islands ANG Station. Shortly thereafter, the old Van Nuys facility was closed and turned over to the City of Los Angeles. On 30 April 1990, the flag at Van Nuys ANG Base was lowered for the last time during a special ceremony.

==== Modern era ====
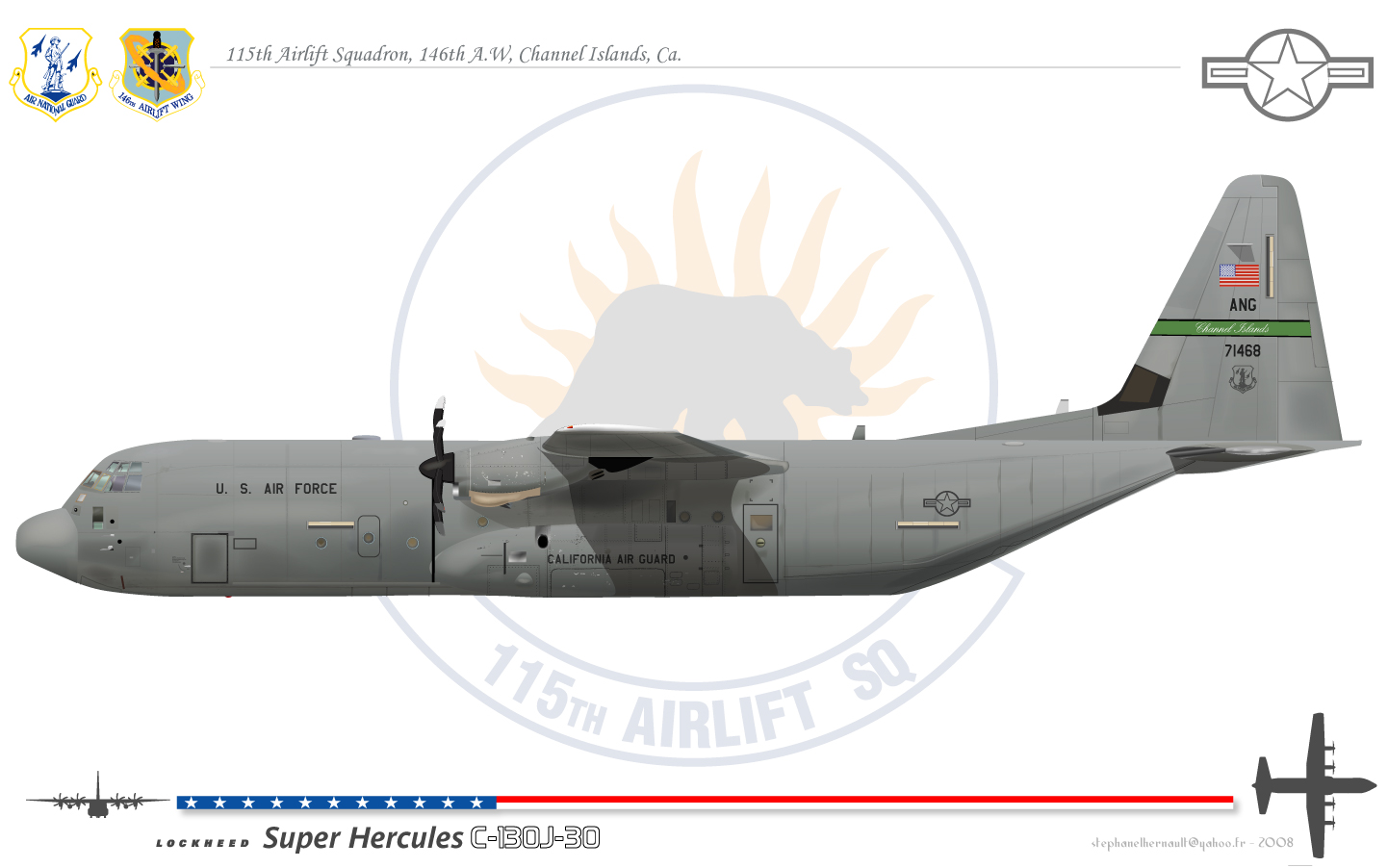
C130J-30 California National Guard 115th Airlift squadron

In August 1990, the world was moving swiftly toward armed confrontation in the Persian Gulf. By late January 1991, the 146th Airlift Wing had provided U.S. Central Command and U.S. Air Forces in Europe more than 650 personnel, voluntarily and involuntarily activated, who participated in Operations Desert Shield and Desert Storm. Aircraft and air crews from the 115th Airlift Squadron flew two-month-long tours of duty in Operation Volant Pine, a backfill of military airlifters to Europe by Air National Guard C-130s.

In 1997, wing members deployed in excess of 10,000 days supporting State and Federal missions. During the period the unit played critical roles in support of DoD missions deploying to Oman and Saudi Arabia in support of Southern Watch, and in peacetime humanitarian airlift and aerial fire fighting, among the many missions accomplished by the wing during the award period.

== Lineage ==
636th Aero Sqadron

- Organized as the 115th Aero Squadronon 28 August 1917 (Note: This squadron is not related to a 115th Aero Squadron that was organized at Kelly Field in March 1918, redeisgnated Squadron B, Kelly Field i May and demobilied in November 1918.)

Redesignated 115th Aero Squadron (Supply) on 1 September 1918
Redesignated 636th Aero Squadron (Supply) on 1 February 1918
Demobilized on 8 April 1919
Reconstituted and consolidated with the 115th Observation Squadron on 20 October 1936

115th Military Airlift Squadron

- Constituted as the 115th Observation Squadron, allotted to the California National Guard and activated on 16 June 1924

Consolidated with the 636th Aero Squadron on 20 October 1936
Ordered to active service on 3 March 1941
Redesignated 115th Observation Squadron (Light) on 13 January 1942
Redesignated 115th Observation Squadron on 4 Ju1 1942
Redesignated 115th Liaison Squadron on 2 April 1943
Inactivated on 25 December 1945

- Redesignated 115th Bombardment Squadron, Light and allotted to the National Guard on 24 May 1946

Organied on 15 August 1946
Extended federal recognition on 16 September 1946
Federalized and placed on active duty on 1 April 1951
Inactivated, released from active duty and returned to California state control on 1 November 1952
Redesignated 115th Fighter-Bomber Squadron on 1 November 1952
Redesignated 115th Fighter-Interceptor Squadron on 1 July 1955
Redesignated 115th Tactical Fighter Squadron on 1 January 1958
Redesignated 115th Air Transport Squadron on 9 January 1960 (Note: On 20 June 1962, the Air Force ordered the squadron redesignated as the 115th Combat Airlift Squadron effective 1 July 1962, but this action was revoked on 27 June 1962.)
Federalized and placed on active duty on 1 October 1961
Released from active duty and returned to California state control on 31 August 1962
Redesignated 115th Military Airlift Squadron on 1 January 1966
Inactivated on 14 April 1970
Consolidated with the 115th Tactical Airlift Squadron on 18 August 1987

115th Airlift Squadron
Constituted as the 115th Tactical Airlift Squadron on 1 January 1970
Activated on 15 April 1970
Consolidated with the 115th Military Airlift Squadron on 18 August 1987
Redesignated 115th Airlift Squadron on 16 March 1992

=== Assignments ===
- Post Headquarters, Kelly Field, 28 August-31 October 1917
- Aviation Concentration Center, 31 October-3 December 1917
- Second Aviation Instruction Center, 27 December 1917 – 11 January 1919
- Aviation Concentration Center, c. 25 Mar-8 Apr 1919
- California National Guard (divisional aviation, 40th Division), 16 June 1924
- III Army Corps, 3 March 1941
- Fourth Air Force, 1 September 1941
- 69th Observation Group (later 69h Reconnaissance Group), 3 September 1941
- II Air Support Command (later II Tactical Air Division), 11 August 1943
- I Tactical Air Division (later III Tactical Air Division), 18 April 1944
- Tenth Air Force, 29 October 1944 (attached to 1st Liaison Group (Provisional), 18 November 1944 – 30 April 1945)
- Fourteenth Air Force, 6 July–25 December 1945 (attached to 312th Fighter Wing, 24 July-1 August 1945)
- 111th Bombardment Group, 15 August 1946
- 146th Composite Group, 1 November 1950
- 126th Bombardment Group, 1 February 1951 (attached to 47th Bombardment Group after May 1951)
- 4400th Combat Crew Training Group, 1 December 1951 – 1 January 1953 (attached to 47th Bombardment Group until February 1952)
- 146th Fighter-Bomber Group (later 146th Fighter-Interceptor Group, 146th Tactical Fighter Group, 146th Air Transport Group), 1 November 1952
- 146th Air Transport Wing, 1 October 1961
- 146th Air Transport Group (later 146th Military Airlift Group), 31 August 1962 – 14 April 1970
- 146th Tactical Airlift Group, 15 April 1970
- 146th Tactical Airlift Wing, 9 February 1975
- 146th Operations Group, 16 March 1992 – present

=== Stations ===
- Kelly Field, Texas, 28 August 1917
- Aviation Concentration Center, Garden City, New York, 31 Oct-3 Dec 1917
- Tours Aerodrome, France, c. 27 December 1917
- St Nazaire, France, c. 11 Jan-c. Mar 1919
- Camp Mills, Garden City, New York, c. 25 Mar-8 Apr 1919
- Clover Field, Los Angeles, California, 16 June 1924
- Griffith Park Aviation Field, Los Angeles, California, 1925
- Sherwood Field, California, 13 March 1941
- Municipal Airport, San Bernardino, California, 13 December 1941
- Ontario Army Airfield, California, 1 June 1942
- Laurel Army Air Field, Mississippi, 11 November 1942
- Esler Army Airfield, Louisiana, 30 March 1943
- Pollock Army Airfield, Louisiana, 7 July 1943
- Brownwood Army Airfield, Texas, 21 November 1943 – 14 September 1944
- Ledo Airfield, India, 11 November 1944

Detachment at Myitkyina Airfield, Burma, after 3 January 1945

- Myitkyina Airfield, Burma, 21 January 1945
- Dinjan Airfield, India (air echelon at Myitkyina Airfield, Burma), 24 April 1945
- Nagaghuli Airfield, India, 9 May 1945
- Chengkung Airfield, China, 20 July 1945
- Hsinching Airfield (A-1), China, 23 July 1945

Operated primarily from Peishiyi Airfield, China, after 11 August 1945

- Peishiyi Airfield, China, 2 September 1945
- Luliang Airfield, China, 3 October 1945
- Kanchrapara Airfield, India, 13 Oct-19 Nov 1945
- Ft Lewis, Washington, 19–25 Dec 1945
- Van Nuys Airport, California, 16 September 1946
- Lockheed Air Terminal, Burbank, California, 1 February 1948
- Langley Air Force Base, Virginia, 1 April 1951 – 1 November 1952
- Van Nuys Airport, California, 1 November 1952
- Channel Islands Air National Guard Station, Oxnard, California. 1 April 1990 – present

=== Aircraft ===
- Included JN-4, DH-4, TW-3, PT-1, BT-1, O–2, and O–17 during period 1924–1932
- Douglas O-38, 1931–1942
- North American O-47, c. 1942–1943
- P-40 Warhawk, 1943
- L-4 Grasshopper, 1942–1943; 1945
- L-5 Sentinel, 1943–1945
- L-1 Vigilant, 1944–1945
- A-26 Invader, 1946–1951
- B-45 Tornado, 1951–1952
- F-51H Mustang, 1953
- F-86A Sabre, 1953–1957
- F-86F Sabre, 1957–1959
- F-86H Sabre, 1959–1961
- C-97C Stratofreighter, 1961–1970
- C-130A Hercules, 1970–1973
- C-130B Hercules, 1973–1981
- C-130E Hercules, 1981–2002
- C-130J Hercules, 2002 – present

== See also ==
- List of American aero squadrons
- List of observation squadrons of the United States Army National Guard
