= Nampong Air Force Base =

Nampong Air Force Base West Nampong Airport
- IATA: none; ICAO: VYNP

Summary
- Airport type: Military
- Serves: Myitkyina
- Location: Myitkyina, Myanmar
- Elevation AMSL: 140 m / 459 ft
- Coordinates: 25°21′09.24″N 097°17′41.58″E

Map

Runways
Direction	Length		Surface
Direction	m	ft	Surface
18/36	3,360	11,025	Asphalt

Nampong Air Force Base (ICAO: VYNP) is a Myanmar Air Force base in Myitkyina, Myanmar (Burma).

Formerly known as Myikyina West, it is located several miles to the west of Myitkyina. It is in current military use and home to a fighter squadron and an attack squadron.

== History ==
Built by the Allies during World War II as Namponmao Airfield, the airfield was used primarily as a transport facility during the Burma Campaign 1944-1945 by the Tenth Air Force 4th Combat Cargo Group beginning in June 1945 flying C-46 Commandos as a combat resupply airfield, air-dropping pallets of supplies and ammunition to the advancing Allied forces on the ground.

With the defeat of the Japanese forces in Burma, the group began cargo and passenger flights over "the Hump" (Himalayan Mountains) to and from China, assisting the movement of the 3d Combat Cargo Group to Shanghai.

The Americans left in November 1945 at the end of the war.
