= 195th Fighter Squadron =

195th Fighter Squadron

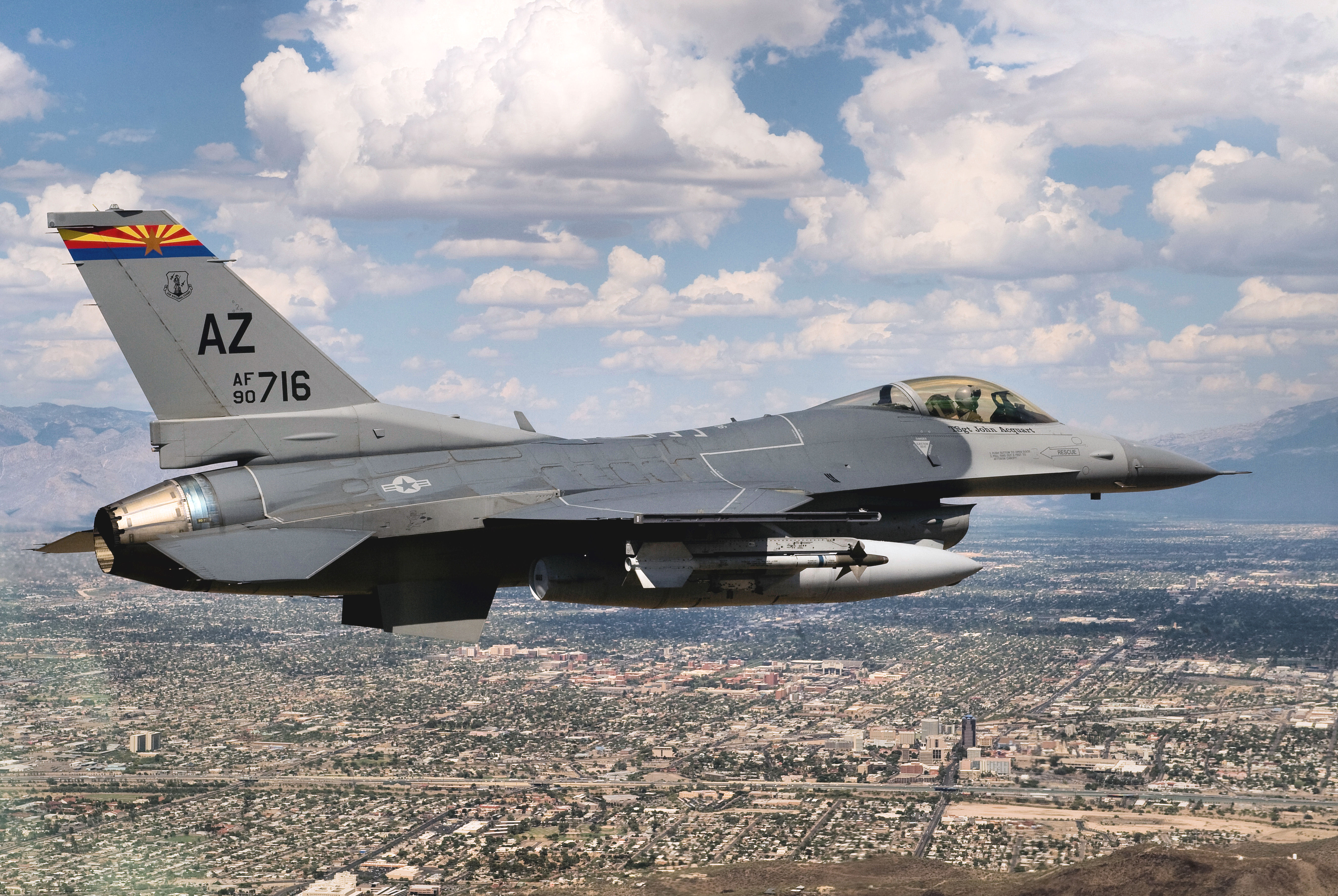
- 195th Fighter Squadron F-16C Fighting Falcon flies over Tucson, Arizona (Note: Aircraft is General Dynamics F-16C Block 42H Fighting Falcon, serial 90-0716.)
- Active: 1943–1945; 1946–1953; 1953–1974; 1984–present
- Country: United States
- Allegiance: Arizona
- Branch: Air National Guard
- Type: Squadron
- Role: Flying training
- Part of: Arizona Air National Guard
- Garrison/HQ: Tucson Air National Guard Base, Arizona
- Nickname: Warhawks

Insignia
- 195th Fighter Squadron emblem

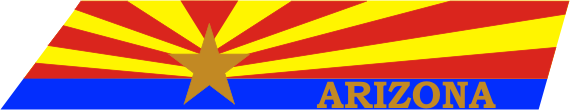
- Tail stripe
- Tail code: AZ

The 195th Fighter Squadron is a unit of the Arizona Air National Guard 162d Fighter Wing located at Tucson Air National Guard Base, Arizona. The 195th is equipped with the F-16 Fighting Falcon.

== History ==
=== World War II ===
Formed at Westover Field, Massachusetts in August 1943. During World War II the 410th Fighter Squadron was assigned to the European Theater of Operations, Ninth Air Force in Western Europe. It was equipped with Republic P-47 Thunderbolts.

The 410th flew its first combat mission on 8 May 1944, a fighter sweep over Normandy. It then took part in preinvasion activities, e.g., escorting Martin B-26 Marauders to attack airdromes, bridges and railways in Occupied France. The squadron patrolled the air over the beachhead when the Allies launched the Normandy invasion on 6 June 1944, and hit troops, tanks, roads, fuel depots and other targets in the assault area until the end of the month.

The 410th moved to the Continent in July 1944 where it struck railroads, hangars, boxcars, warehouses and other objectives to prevent reinforcements from reaching the front at St. Lo, where the Allies broke through on 25 July 1944. The squadron bombed such targets as troops in the Falaise-Argentan area in August 1944. During the Battle of the Bulge, December 1944 – January 1945, the 410th concentrated on the destruction of bridges, marshalling yards and highways. It flew reconnaissance missions to support ground operations in the Rhine Valley in March 1945, hitting airfields, motor transports, etc. The squadron continued tactical air operations until 4 May 1945.

Returned to the United States and prepared for transfer to the Pacific Theater during the Summer of 1945, the Japanese Capitulation in August led to the squadron's inactivation in November 1945.

=== California Air National Guard ===
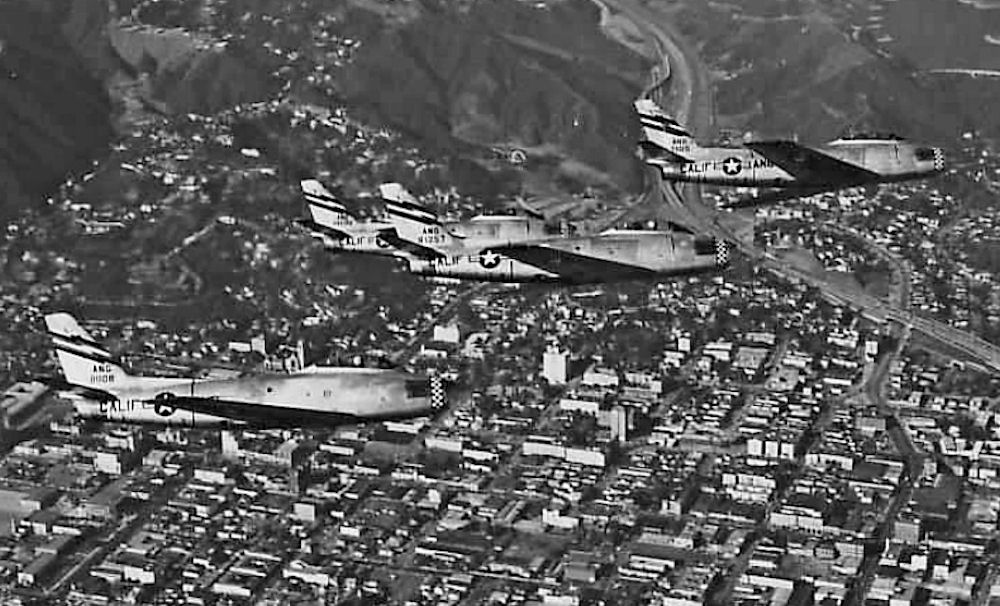
195th Fighter-Bomber Squadron – North American F-86A Sabre Formation over Los Angeles, 1954

The 410th Squadron was redesignated the 195th Fighter Squadron. It was allotted to the National Guard on 24 May 1946. It was organized at Van Nuys Airport, California on 16 September 1946. The squadron was equipped with P-51D Mustangs and was assigned to the 146th Fighter Group, also at Van Nuys Airport.

As part of the Continental Air Command Fourth Air Force, the squadron trained for tactical fighter missions and air-to-air combat. The unit was called to active federal service on 1 March 1951 for duty in the Korean War. Its parent 146th Group moved to Moody Air Force Base, Georgia, where it trained pilots. The 195th, however, remained at Van Nuys Airport.

After the Korean War, the squadron was equipped with the long-range F-51H Mustang and retained an air defense mission. In February 1954, it was equipped with F-86A Sabre jet interceptors. By July 1955 the transition from the F-51H Mustang to the F-86A Sabre was complete. The squadron was redesignated a fighter interceptor unit with an air defense mission for the Los Angeles area. During the 1950s, the squadron received newer F-86F Sabres in 1957 and later F-86H Sabre day interceptors in 1959.

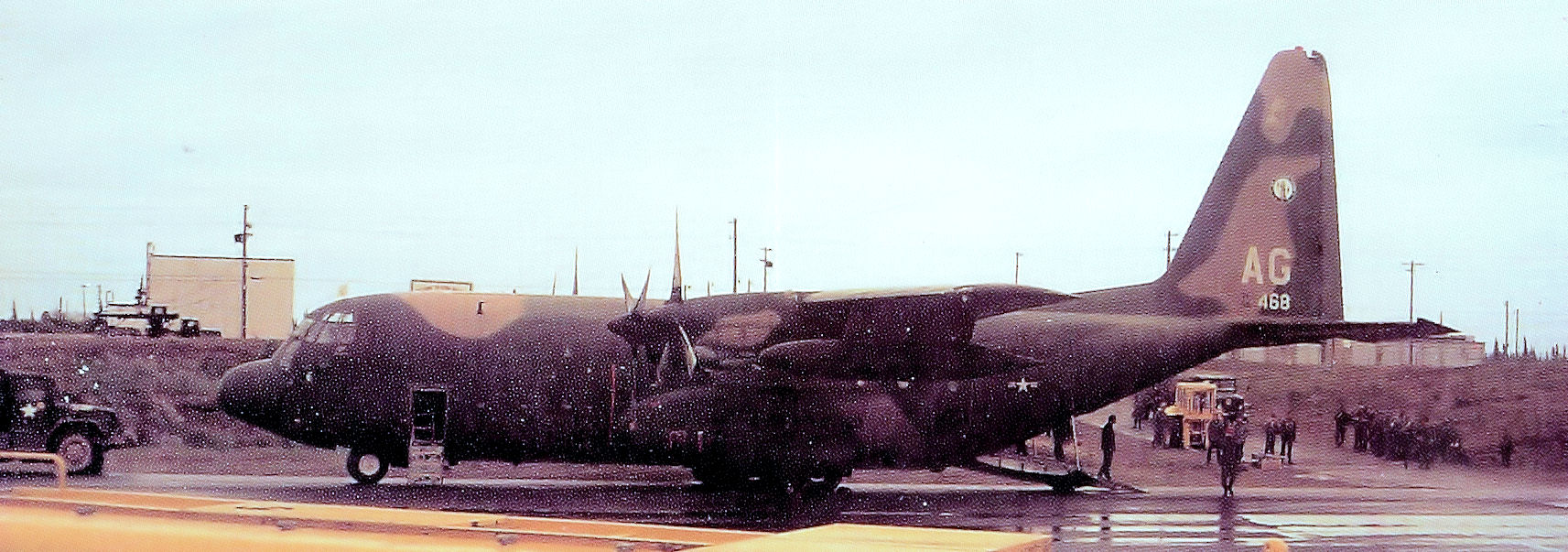
1972 photo of 195th TAS C-130A 56–0468 in Alaska

In 1960, the squadron was assigned an airlift mission, trading in its Sabre interceptors for 4-engined Boeing C-97 Stratofreighter transports. With air transportation recognized as a critical wartime need, the squadron was redesignated the 195th Air Transport Squadron, Heavy. During the Berlin Crisis of 1961, both the 146th Wing and the squadron were federalized on 1 October 1961. From Van Nuys, the 195th augmented Military Air Transport Service airlift capability worldwide in support of the Air Force's needs. It returned again to California state control on 31 August 1962. Throughout the 1960s, the unit flew long-distance transport missions in support of Air Force requirements, frequently sending aircraft to Hawaii, Japan, the Philippines, and during the Vietnam War, to both South Vietnam, Okinawa and Thailand.

The C-97s were retired in 1970 and the unit was gained by Tactical Air Command (TAC). It transitioned to the Lockheed C-130A Hercules theater transport, flying missions in support of TAC throughout the United States and Alaska. In 1973 the C-130A models were transferred to the Republic of Vietnam Air Force and they were replaced by the C-130B. During this period, both the 195th and its sister squadron, the 115th Tactical Airlift Squadron shared the same pool of aircraft.

With the end of the Vietnam War, the California National Guard bureau decided to downsize the 146th Tactical Airlift Wing. With C-130s units being transferred to Military Airlift Command, the 195th was inactivated on 30 September 1974. Its personnel, equipment and aircraft of the 195th were reassigned to the 115th Tactical Airlift Squadron.

=== Arizona Air National Guard ===
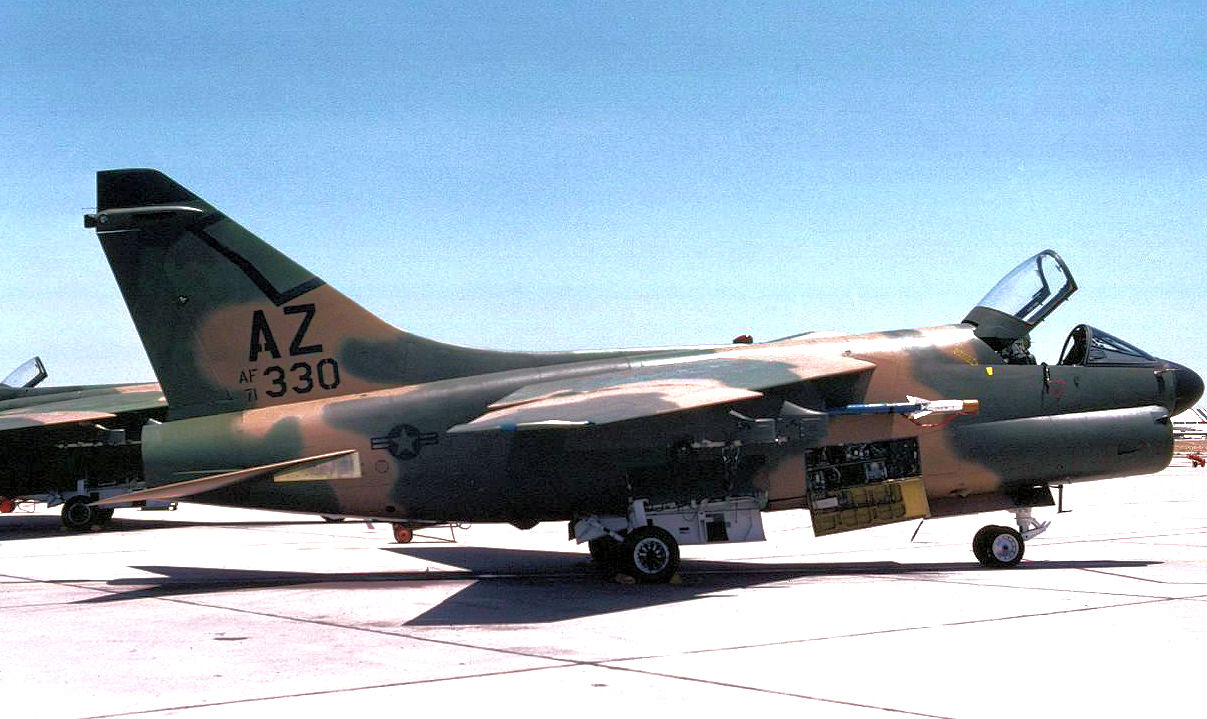
195th TFS A-7D 71-330, about 1985

In late 1983, the 195th was transferred to the Arizona Air National Guard. It was formed in January 1984 as the 195 Tactical Fighter Training Squadron and was extended federal recognition on 1 February. The mission of the unit was to train combat-ready pilots for the Air National Guard (Replacement Training Unit or RTU). The 195th was the second of eventually four squadrons assigned to the 162d Tactical Fighter Training Group at Tucson ANGB. It was equipped with the A-7D/K Corsair II. The squadron was the last of the RTUs in the A-7D aircraft.

Conversion from the A-7D/K started in 1991 when the 195th started to receive older F-16A Block 5 aircraft from other USAF units. This mission remained after the conversion, but the older airframes were not quite suited to fulfill this mission. However, this transition was quite short-lived since the squadron had to disperse its airframes already a year later. With the A-7Ds being retired in 1992, the squadron became a strictly ground academic squadron with no aircraft assigned at the time.

During the same period the ANG started with training foreign non-NATO pilots. Six aircraft from the 148th FTS were designated to begin a school for those students. This group of aircraft and an initial cadre of instructors formed what would later become International Military Training. The squadron had no official number or designation. In 1995 the ANG Staff decided to transfer this school into the 195th. Thus the squadron regained its aircraft and started flying again. This time these airframes were all F-16A block 15 models, giving the squadron a better opportunity in its task.

In 2006 the squadron started converting to F-16C block 25 airframes. As one of the last F-16A block 15 airframe squadrons within the ANG and the USAF all together, it was decided to mothball the latter completely. Therefore, the squadron started receiving newer block 25 airframes that were becoming available from other squadrons. The mission of the squadron stayed exactly the same, just being able to perform in a more modern manner with the added capabilities of the block 25 aircraft.

=== Lineage ===
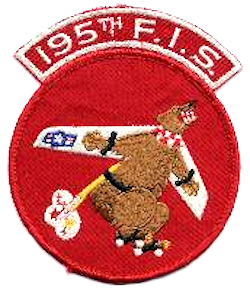
Legacy 195th Fighter-Interceptor Squadron Emblem

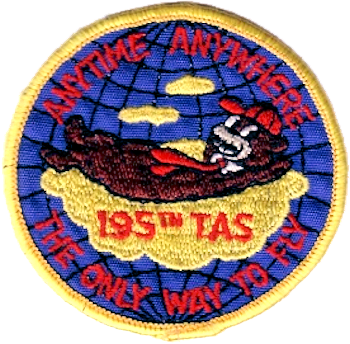
Legacy 195th Tactical Airlift Squadron Emblem

195th Military Airlift Squadron

- Constituted as the 410th Fighter Squadron on 25 May 1943

Activated on 15 August 1943
Inactivated on 7 November 1945
Redesignated 195th Fighter Squadron, and allotted to the National Guard on 24 May 1946.
Extended federal recognition and activated on 16 September 1946
Redesignated 195th Fighter-Interceptor Squadron on 1 October 1951
Redesignated 195th Fighter-Bomber Squadron on 1 January 1953
Redesignated 195th Fighter-Interceptor Squadron on 1 July 1955
Redesignated 195th Tactical Reconnaissance Squadron on 8 April 1958
Redesignated 195th Tactical Fighter Squadron on 1 December 1958
Redesignated 195th Air Transport Squadron, Heavy on 1 January 1960
Federalized and placed on active duty, 1 October 1961
Released from active duty and returned to California state control, 31 August 1962
Redesignated 195th Military Airlift Squadron on 8 January 1966
Consolidated with the 195th Tactical Airlift Squadron

195th Fighter Squadron
Redesignated 195th Tactical Airlift Squadron on 1 April 1970
Inactivated on 30 September 1974 and withdrawn from the Air National Guard
Redesignated 195th Tactical Fighter Training Squadron, consolidated with the 195th Military Airlift Squadron and allotted to the Air National Guard on 1 January 1984
Extended federal recognition and activated on 1 February 1984
Redesignated 195th Fighter Squadron on 16 March 1992

=== Assignments ===
- 373d Fighter Group, 15 Aug 1943 – 7 Nov 1945
- 146th Fighter Group (later 146th Composite Group), 16 September 1946
- 144th Fighter Group (later 144th Fighter-Interceptor Group, 144th Fighter-Bomber Group), 1 March 1951
- 146th Fighter Group (later 146th Fighter-Interceptor Group, 146th Tactical Fighter Group, 146th Air Transport Group), 1 January 1953
- 146th Air Transport Wing, 1 October 1961
- 146th Air Transport Group, 31 August 1962
- 195th Air Transport Group (later 195th Military Airlift Group, 195th Tactical Airlift Group), 1 October 1962 – 30 September 1974
- 162d Tactical Fighter Group (later 162d Fighter Group), 1 February 1984
- 162d Operations Group, 1 October 1995 – Present

=== Stations ===
- Westover Field, Massachusetts, 15 August 1943
- Norfolk Airport, Virginia, 23 October 1943
- Richmond Army Air Base, Virginia, 15 February – 15 March 1944
- RAF Woodchurch (AAF-419), England, 4 April – 4 July 1944
- Tour-en-Bessin Airfield (A-13), France, 19 July 1944
- Saint James Airfield (A-29), France, 19 August 1944
- Reims/Champagne Airfield (A-62), France, 19 September 1944
- Le Culot Airfield (A-89), Belgium, 22 October 1944
- Venlo Airfield (Y-55), Netherlands, 11 March 1945
- Lippstadt Airfield (Y-98), Germany, 20 April 1945
- AAF Station Illesheim, Germany, 20 May–July 1945
- Sioux Falls Army Air Field, South Dakota, 4 August 1945
- Seymour Johnson Field, North Carolina, 20 August 1945
- Mitchel Field, New York, 28 September – 7 November 1945
- Van Nuys Airport, California, 16 September 1946 – 31 January 1948
- Lockheed Air Terminal, Burbank, California, 1–29 February 1948
- Van Nuys Airport, California, 1 March 1948 – 30 September 1974
- Tucson International Airport (later Tucson Air National Guard Base), Arizona, 1 February 1984

=== Aircraft ===
- P-47 Thunderbolt, 1943–1945
- F-51D Mustang, 1946–1953
- F-86A Sabre, 1953–1957
- F-86F Sabre, 1957–1959
- F-86H Sabre, 1959–1961
- C-97C Stratofreighter, 1961–1970
- C-130A Hercules, 1970–1973
- C-130B Hercules, 1973–1974
- A-7D/K Corsair II, 1984–1992
- F-16A Block 5 Fighting Falcon, 1991–1992
- F-16A Block 15 Fighting Falcon, 1995–2006
- F-16C Block 25 Fighting Falcon, 2006–present
