= Michael J. Ingelido =

United States Air Force general

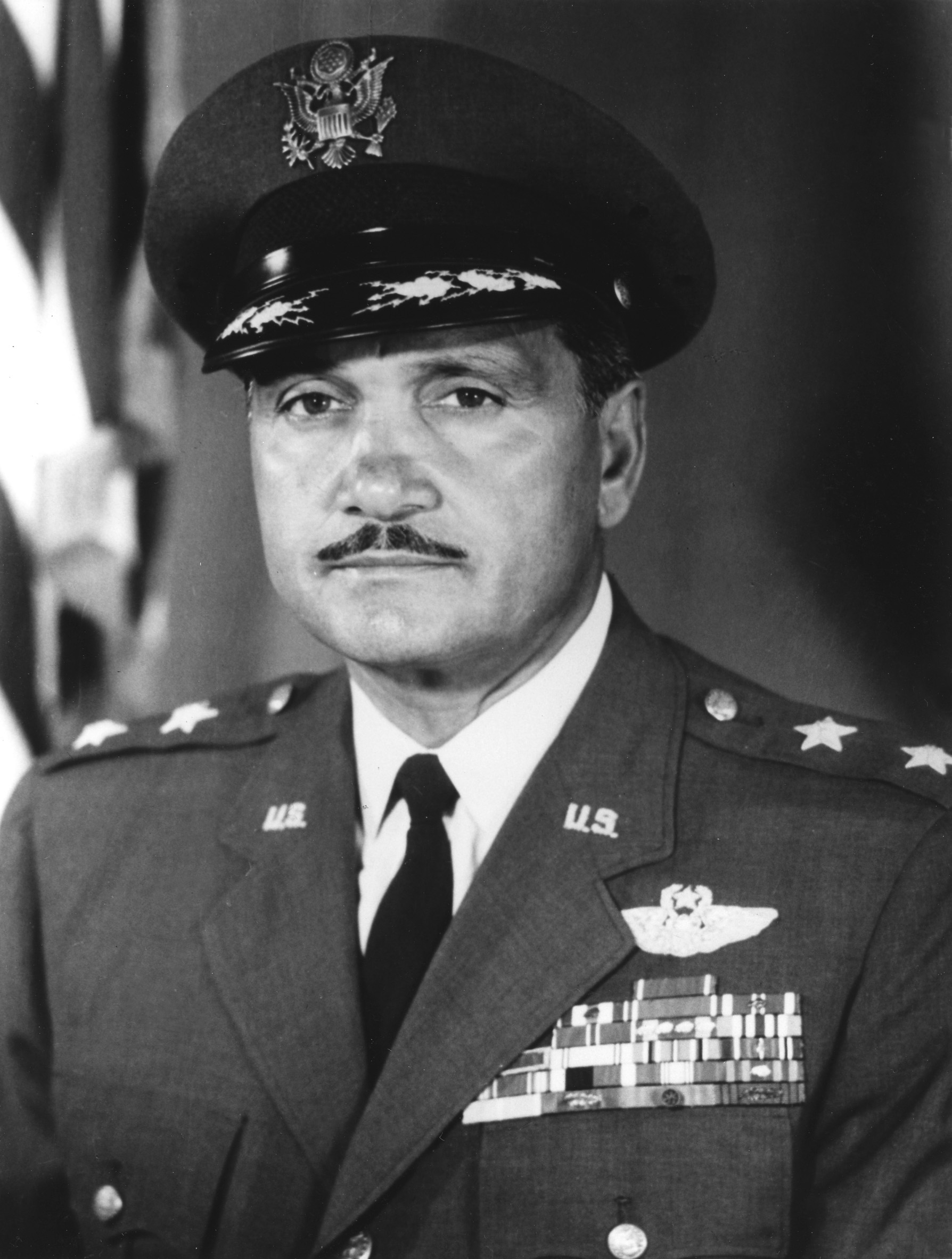
- Born: Michael Joseph Ingelido; November 20, 1916; Meriden, Connecticut, U.S.
- Died: April 28, 2015 (aged 98); Colorado Springs, Colorado, U.S.
- Military career
- Allegiance: United States of America
- Branch: United States Air Force
- Service years: 1941–1972
- Rank: Major General
- Commands: Fourteenth Aerospace Force; 2nd Fighter Squadron; 412th Fighter Squadron; Vice Commander, Thirteenth Air Force, others below
- Awards: Distinguished Service Cross, Distinguished Service Medal, Silver Star with oak leaf cluster, Legion of Merit, Distinguished Flying Cross with oak leaf cluster, the Bronze Star Medal, Air Medal with 20 oak leaf clusters, Joint Service Commendation Medal, Order of the British Empire, French Croix de Guerre with Palm, Belgian Croix de Guerre with Palm and Belgian Order of Leopold

Michael Joseph Ingelido (November 20, 1916 – April 28, 2015) was an American Air Force major general who was commander of the Fourteenth Aerospace Force, (Air Defense Command), Ent Air Force Base, Colorado.

== Early life ==
Ingelido was born in 1916 in Meriden, Connecticut, and was educated in the public schools of nearby Southington. He graduated from the Teachers College of Connecticut (now Central Connecticut State University) in 1937 with a Bachelor of Science degree in education. He performed graduate work at Duke and Yale universities and then taught school for three years in Connecticut. He enlisted in the Army Air Corps as an aviation cadet in February 1941, and following his graduation from pilot training, was commissioned a second lieutenant in September 1941.

== World War II ==
During World War II, Ingelido flew 195 combat missions in the European Theater of Operations in British Spitfires and U.S. P-39 and P-47 fighter aircraft. From June 1942 to June 1945, while commanding the 2nd and 412th Fighter Squadrons and the 373rd Fighter Group, he destroyed 22 German aircraft: 12 in the air and 10 on the ground.

Shortly after the Allied invasion in June 1944, he led his group in three dive-bombing attacks on German fortifications at Brest, France. After leading the first squadron of P-47 Thunderbolts in the initial attack, Ingelido, his aircraft damaged, stayed in the area to lead the dive-bombing attacks of two other squadrons when they were unable to locate the primary target through the smoking ruins. He was later awarded the Distinguished Service Cross. His citation is below:

For extraordinary heroism in action against the enemy over the Brest Peninsula, 31 August 1944. On this date, having led his squadron through extremely severe weather and terrific hostile ground fire on three separate bomb runs in an attempt to destroy his target, Lieutenant Colonel Ingelido, after having had his airplane hit by enemy fire numerous times on each of the three previous runs, returned a fourth time over this heavily defended area to mark it so that another squadron might be able to deliver its attack with telling accuracy. The determination, coolness, and courage displayed by Lieutenant Colonel Ingelido on this occasion reflect the highest credit upon himself and the Armed Forces of the United States.

== Cold War ==
Following the end of World War II, he commanded the 86th Fighter Group and the 70th Fighter Wing in Germany. He returned to the United States in 1949 for assignment with the Weapons Systems Evaluation Group in Washington, D.C.

In 1951 he was assigned to the Air Force Cambridge Research Center as commander, 6520th Test Wing, later becoming vice commander of the center. He then attended the Air War College at Maxwell Air Force Base, Alabama, graduating in 1955. From 1955 to 1957 he was director of operations for Far East Air Forces in Tokyo, Japan. When that headquarters was redesignated Pacific Air Forces, and moved to Hawaii in 1957, he remained with PACAF as deputy assistant chief of staff for operations.

After returning to the United States in July 1959 he attended the National War College in Washington, D.C., graduating in 1960. He was assigned to the Organization of the Joint Chiefs of Staff in 1960 and served as secretary of the OJCS until August 1964 when he became inspector general of the Air Defense Command. Ingelido became vice commander, Thirteenth Air Force (PACAF), in January 1966 and returned to Aerospace Defense Command as Deputy Chief of Staff for Plans in November 1967. He assumed command of the Fourteenth Aerospace Force at Ent Air Force Base in August 1969.

== Post-retirement ==
Ingelido retired as a major general on September 1, 1972. If he hadn't retired then, he could have been promoted to lieutenant general. He resided in Colorado Springs, Colorado until his death. In 2012 he celebrated his 70th wedding anniversary with his wife, Elinor Affinto Ingelido. He died at his home there after a stroke, on April 28, 2015, at the age of 98. His wife, Elinor Ingelido, lived until February 18, 2016, almost a year more, to the age of 99. Her cause of death complications from skin cancer.

== Awards and decorations ==
Ingelido's military decorations include the Distinguished Service Cross, Distinguished Service Medal, Silver Star with oak leaf cluster, Legion of Merit, Distinguished Flying Cross with oak leaf cluster, the Bronze Star Medal, Air Medal with 20 oak leaf clusters, Joint Service Commendation Medal, Order of the British Empire, French Croix de Guerre with Palm, Belgian Croix de Guerre with Palm and Belgian Order of Leopold.
