= 197th Air Refueling Squadron =

Arizona Air National Guard unit

197th Air Refueling Squadron

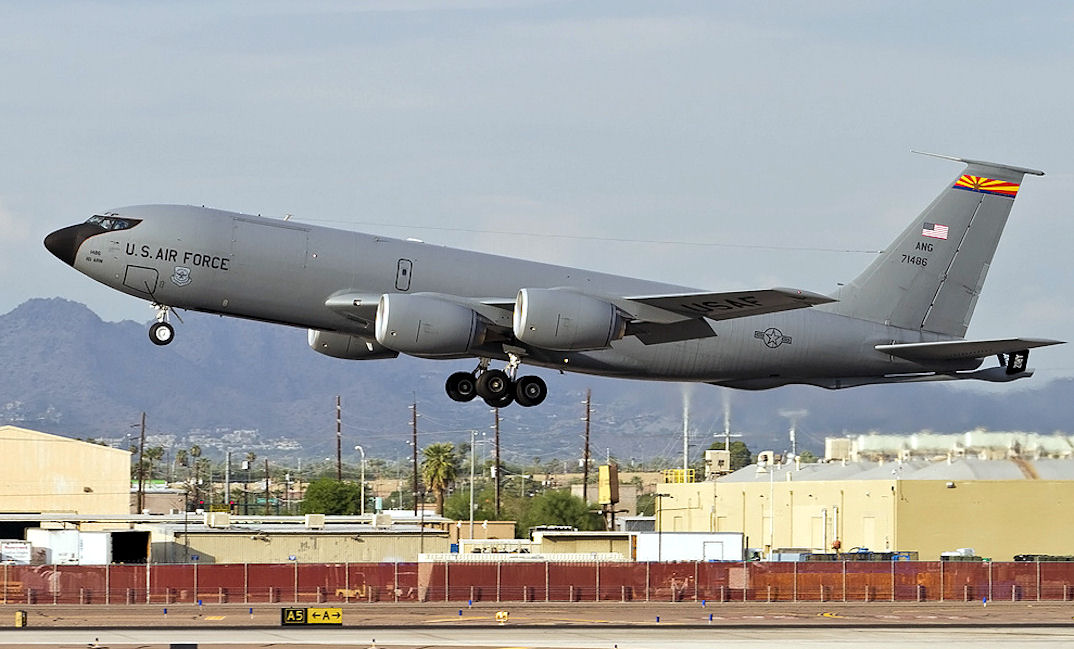
- 197th Air Refueling Squadron KC-135R taking off from Goldwater Air National Guard Base (Note: aircraft is Boeing KC-135R Stratotanker, serial 57-1486.)
- Active: 1943–1945; 1946–1952; 1952–present
- Country: United States
- Allegiance: Arizona
- Branch: Air National Guard
- Type: Squadron
- Role: Aerial refueling
- Part of: Arizona Air National Guard
- Garrison/HQ: Goldwater Air National Guard Base, Arizona.
- Nickname: Copperheads

Insignia
- 197th Air Refueling Squadron emblem

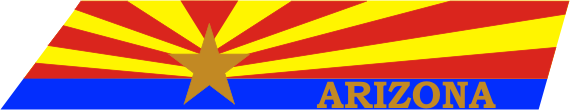
- Tail stripe

Aircraft flown
- Tanker: KC-135R Stratotanker

The 197th Air Refueling Squadron is a unit of the Arizona Air National Guard 161st Air Refueling Wing located at Goldwater Air National Guard Base, Phoenix, Arizona. The 197th is equipped with the KC-135R Stratotanker.

== History ==
=== World War II ===
Formed at Westover Field, Massachusetts, in August 1943. During World War II the 412th Fighter Squadron was assigned to the European Theater of Operations, Ninth Air Force in Western Europe. It was equipped with P-47 Thunderbolts.

The 412th flew its first combat mission on 8 May 1944, a fighter sweep over Normandy. It then took part in preinvasion activities, e.g., escorting Martin B-26 Marauders to attack airdromes, bridges and railroads in Occupied France. The squadron patrolled the air over the beachhead when the Allies launched the Normandy invasion on 6 June 1944, and hit troops, tanks, roads, fuel depots and other targets in the assault area until the end of the month.

The 412th moved to the Continent in July 1944 where it struck railroads, hangars, boxcars, warehouses and other objectives to prevent reinforcements from reaching the front at St. Lo, where the Allies broke through on 25 July 1944. The squadron bombed such targets as troops in the Falaise-Argentan area in August 1944. During the Battle of the Bulge, December 1944 – January 1945, the 412th concentrated on the destruction of bridges, marshalling yards and highways. It flew reconnaissance missions to support ground operations in the Rhine Valley in March 1945, hitting airfields, motor transports, etc. The squadron continued tactical air operations until 4 May 1945.

Returned to the United States and prepared for transfer to the Pacific Theater during the Summer of 1945, the Japanese Capitulation in August led to the squadron's inactivation in November 1945.

=== Arizona Air National Guard ===
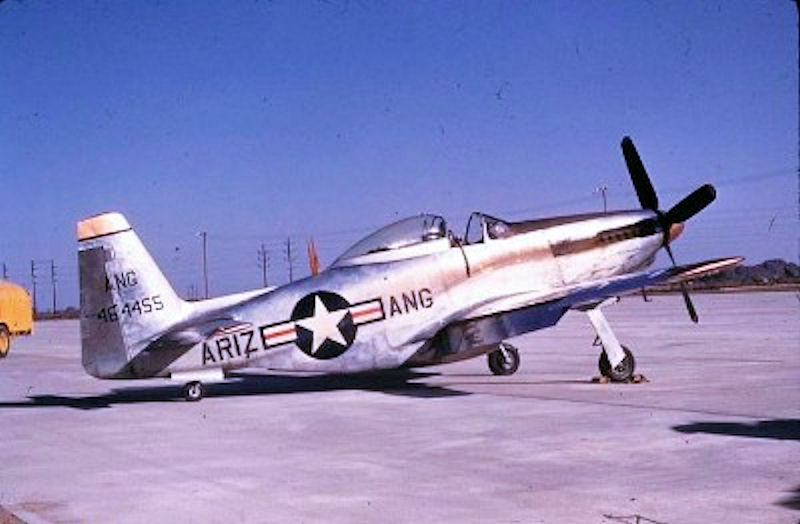
197th Fighter Squadron F-51H Mustang (Note: Aircraft is North American F-51H Mustang, serial 44-64455.)

The 412th was redesignated the 197th Fighter Squadron and allotted to the National Guard on 24 May 1946. It was organized at Luke Air Force Base, Arizona and was extended federal recognition on 12 December 1946. The squadron was equipped with Republic F-47D Thunderbolts and was trained by Fourth Air Force, Continental Air Command.

During the Korean War, the 197th was federalized on 1 February 1951 and assigned to Air Training Command. ATC equipped the squadron with Republic F-84B Thunderjet aircraft and used it as a training organization. Some fighter pilots went to Korea to fly combat missions. Other squadron personnel, because of their experience, were sent to bases in the U.S. and Japan to train new people entering the Air Force. The squadron was released from active duty and returned to Arizona state control, 1 November 1952.

With the release from active service, the federal government authorized the construction of a new base at Sky Harbor Airport in Phoenix for the Arizona Air National Guard. The 197th returned to flying the F-51H Mustangs.

==== Air defense mission ====
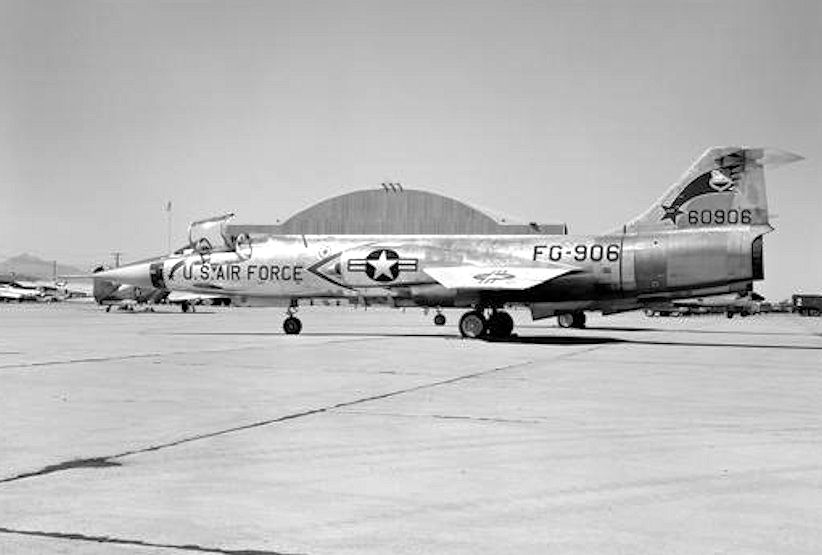
197th Fighter-Interceptor Squadron F-104A (Note: Aircraft is Lockheed F-104A Starfighter, serial 56-0906, about 1961.)

In 1954, the unit assumed a new mission of air defense of the Phoenix area. The prop-driven Mustangs were replaced by North American F-86A Sabre day fighters, and the squadron was redesignated the 197th Fighter-Interceptor Squadron. On 2 October 1957, the 197th was authorized to expand to a group level, and the 161st Fighter Group was established. The 197th becoming the group's flying squadron. Other elements assigned into the group were the 161st headquarters, 161st Material Squadron (Maintenance and Supply), 161st Air Base Squadron, and the 161st USAF Dispensary.

The F-86A Sabre day fighters were replaced in 1958 by the all-weather/day-night F-86L Sabre Interceptor aircraft, and in 1960, the 197th was one of three selected ANG units to receive F-104A Starfighter interceptors from the ADC active-duty interceptor forces.

The 161st Group was called into active service in November 1961 as the construction of the infamous Berlin Wal" pushed the world to the brink of war. Within a month after mobilization, 750 personnel and 22 197th F-104 aircraft were in place at Ramstein Air Base, West Germany as the unit took up flying daily air defense patrols at the edge of the Iron Curtain. With world tension easing, the squadron returned home in August 1962.

==== Transport mission ====
With the return to Arizona, the unit was reassigned from ADC to the Military Air Transport Service in October 1962. The Mach-2 Starfighters were exchanged for large, 4-engined C-97G Stratofreighters with a mission of worldwide transport of personnel, supplies and equipment. The 197th Air Transport Squadron (later 197th Military Airlift Squadron) flew missions to the Caribbean, Europe, Japan, South Vietnam, Thailand and Australia. During the height of the Vietnam War, the squadron routinely flew trans-Pacific medical evacuation missions from hospitals in South Vietnam, Japan, and the Philippines of wounded servicemen and women to the United States, being designated the 197th Aeromedical Airlift Squadron. In 1969 the military airlift squadron designation was returned and the unit again flew scheduled transport missions for Military Airlift Command.

==== Air Refueling ====
In 1972, military requirements resulted in a change in mission when the group was reassigned from MAC transport duties to the Strategic Air Command (SAC). Under SAC the group became an air refueling unit, being with the air refueling version of the C-97 transport, the KC-97 Stratofreighter. Familiarity with the aircraft led to a smooth transition to the new refueling mission. In 1977, SAC announced that Air National Guard refueling units would begin to upgrade to the Boeing KC-135 Stratotanker. The 197th Air Refueling Squadron has been flying the KC-135 for almost 40 years.

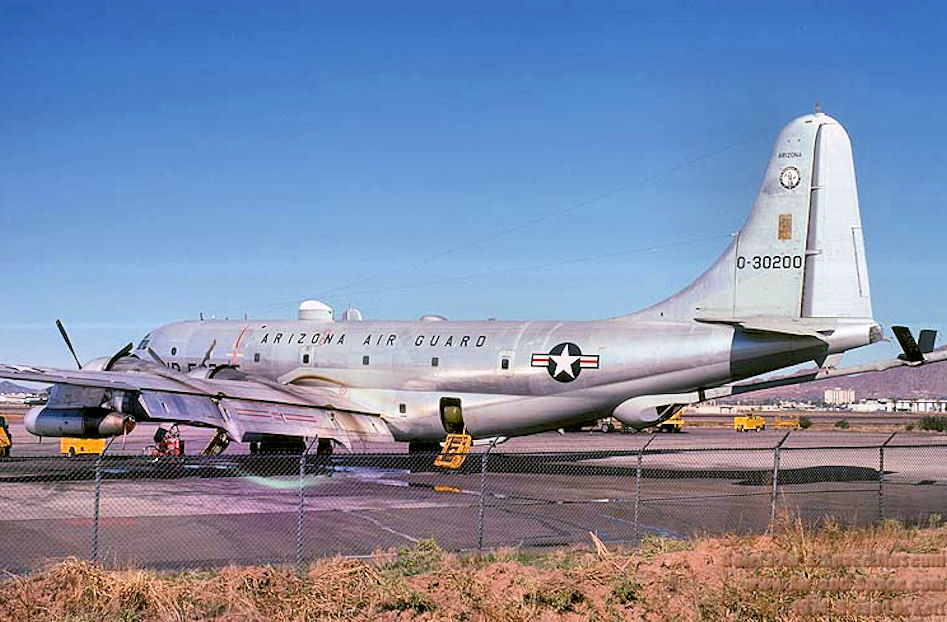
197th ARS KC-97 Stratofreighter, AF Ser. No. 53-0200

During the 1991 Gulf War, Air National Guard tanker units were quickly called into action. An around-the-clock airlift began to support the buildup to the conflict, Operation Desert Shield. Tankers and crews from the 197th were some of the first to arrive in Saudi Arabia. Elements of the 197th were assigned to the 1709th Air Refueling Wing (Provisional), flying from King Abdul Aziz Air Base, Jeddah, Saudi Arabia.

From the start and for the duration, tankers servicing the conflict left Phoenix weekly, loaded with maintenance and support technicians who worked in the Saudi Arabian desert up to 45 days, and in some cases more. As the allies prepared to move against Iraq, aircraft crews, maintenance personnel, medics, fire fighters, security forces and food service technicians were dispatched to bases in Europe and the United States. Before the war in the Persian Gulf was concluded more than two-thirds of the force assigned to the 161st Air Refueling Group had served on active duty in some capacity to support the Middle East effort.

In 1994, 1995 and 1997 the unit deployed to Pisa, Italy where its tankers supported NATO operations in Bosnia. 1997 also saw the 197th facing challenges in the United Arab Emirates. The unit was vital to the success of Operation Deny Flight and Operation Southern Watch. 1 October 1995, marked another key change in the unit's long history. The 161st Air Refueling Group was redesignated as the 161st Air Refueling Wing under Air Mobility Command. 1996 saw the Copperheads turn 50 years old. The unit celebrated with year-round contests and a 50th Anniversary Celebration in December.

The 197th sent personnel to Operation Northern Watch early in 1999. Based at Incirlik Air Base, Turkey, they supported flight operations within the northern no-fly zone over Iraq. Early in the second quarter of 1999, 197th Copperheads were quickly pressed into service over Kosovo for Operation Allied Force. Nearly 200 unit airmen served on active duty for about two months, flying 125 missions to offload almost 2.5 million gallons of fuel. The airmen returned to Phoenix in late June 1999.

Although not directly called as a unit the Copperheads played a vital role in support units during Operation Enduring Freedom in 2003. Many security forces saw duty overseas directly supporting bases while maintenance and operations personnel were called to support the ongoing operations. In 2026, the Copperheads were called up in support of Operation Epic Fury, and deployed to the Middle East in support of US and Israeli air strikes on the Islamic Republic of Iran

=== Lineage ===
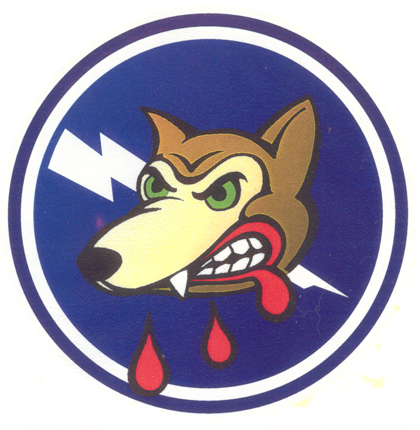
Legacy 412th Fighter Squadron Emblem

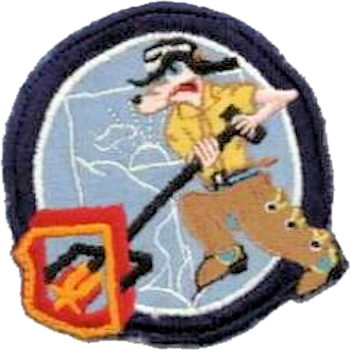
197th Fighter-Interceptor Squadron -Emblem

- Constituted as 412th Fighter Squadron on 25 May 1943

Activated on 15 August 1943
Inactivated on 7 November 1945
Redesignated: 197th Fighter Squadron, Single Engine and allotted to the National Guard on 24 May 1946
Extended federal recognition on 12 December 1946
Federalized and placed on active duty, 1 February 1951
Redesignated 197th Pilot Training Squadron in February 1951
Released from active duty and returned to Arizona state control, 1 November 1952
Redesignated 197th Fighter-Interceptor Squadron on 1 November 1952
Redesignated 197th Fighter-Bomber Squadron on 1 December 1952
Redesignated 197th Fighter-Interceptor Squadron on 1 July 1955
Federalized and placed on active duty, 1 November 1961
Released from active duty and returned to Arizona state control on 15 August 1962
Redesignated 197th Tactical Fighter Squadron on 1 June 1962
Redesignated 197th Air Transport Squadron, Heavy on 1 October 1962
Redesignated 197th Military Airlift Squadron on 1 January 1966
Redesignated 197th Aeromedical Airlift Squadron on 3 October 1968
Redesignated 197th Military Airlift Squadron on 1 December 1969
Redesignated 197th Air Refueling Squadron, Medium on 1 August 1972
Redesignated 197th Air Refueling Squadron, Heavy on 1 October 1977
Redesignated 197th Air Refueling Squadron on 16 March 1992

=== Assignments ===
- 373d Fighter Group, 15 Aug 1943 – 7 Nov 1945
- 146th Fighter Group, 12 December 1946
- 127th Pilot Training Group, 1 Feb 1951 – 1 Nov 1952
- 146th Fighter-Bomber Group (later 146th Fighter-Interceptor Group), 1 November 1952
- 161st Fighter Group (Air Defense), 2 October 1957
- 86th Air Division, 25 November 1961
- 161st Fighter Group (Air Defense) (later 161st Air Transport Group, 161st Military Airlift Group, 161st Aeromedical Airlift Group, 161st Military Airlift Group, 161st Air Refueling Group, 11 July 1962
- 161st Operations Group, 1 October 1995

=== Stations ===
- Westover Field, Massachusetts, 15 August 1943
- Norfolk Airport, Virginia, 23 October 1943
- Richmond Army Air Base, Virginia, 15 February – 15 March 1944
- RAF Woodchurch (AAF-419), England, 4 April – 4 July 1944
- Tour-en-Bessin Airfield (A-13), France, 19 July 1944
- Saint James Airfield (A-29), France, 19 August 1944
- Reims/Champagne Airfield (A-62), France, 19 September 1944
- Le Culot Airfield (A-89), Belgium, 22 October 1944
- Venlo Airfield (Y-55), Netherlands, 11 March 1945
- Lippstadt Airfield (Y-98), Germany, 20 April 1945
- AAF Station Illesheim, Germany, 20 May–July 1945
- Sioux Falls Army Air Field, South Dakota, 4 August 1945
- Seymour Johnson Field, North Carolina, 20 August 1945
- Mitchel Field, New York, 28 September – 7 November 1945
- Luke Field (later Luke AFB), Arizona, 12 December 1946 – 1 November 1942
- Phoenix Sky Harbor Airport, Arizona, 1 November 1952
- Ramstein Air Base, West Germany, November 1961
- Phoenix Sky Harbor Airport (later Goldwater Air National Guard Base), Arizona, 15 August 1962 – present

=== Aircraft ===
- P-47 Thunderbolt, 1943–1945
- F-51D Mustang, 1947–1950, 1952–1954
- F-84B Thunderjet, 1950–1951
- F-84E/G Thunderjet, 1951–1952
- F-86A Sabre, 1954–1958
- F-86L Sabre Interceptor, 1958–1960
- F-104A Starfighter, 1960–1962
- C-97G Stratofreighter, 1962–1972
- KC-97L Stratotanker, 1972–1977
- KC-135A Stratotanker, 1977–1982
- KC-135E Stratotanker, 1982–2007
- KC-135R Stratotanker, 2007–Present
