= RAF Woodchurch =

Former Royal Air Force station in Kent, England

RAF Woodchurch USAAF Station AAF-419
- Near Woodchurch, Kent in England
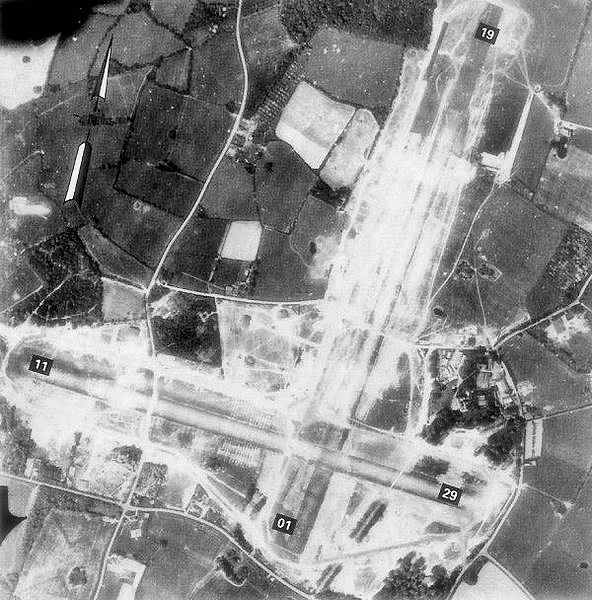
- Woodchurch airfield nearing completion of construction, 13 March 1943. Both runways appear completed, however the technical and administrative areas are not yet ready for use.

Site information
- Type: RAF Advanced landing ground
- Code: XO
- Owner: Air Ministry
- Operator: Royal Air Force; United States Army Air Forces
- Controlled by: Second Tactical Air Force * No. 83 Group RAF; Ninth Air Force

Location
- Shown within Kent RAF Woodchurch (the United Kingdom)
- Coordinates: 51°05′34″N 000°46′47″E

Site history
- Built: 1943
- Built by: RAF Airfield Construction Service
- In use: July 1943 - September 1944
- Battles/wars: European theatre of World War II

Airfield information
- Elevation: 46 metres (151 ft) AMSL
Runways
Direction	Length and surface
01/19	Sommerfeld Tracking
11/29	Sommerfeld Tracking

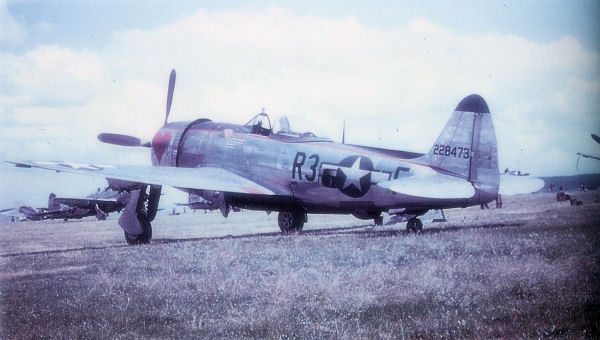
410th Fighter Squadron Republic P-47D-28-RA Thunderbolt42-28473

Royal Air Force Woodchurch, or more simply RAF Woodchurch, is a former Royal Air Force Advanced landing ground located approximately 5 miles (8.0 km) west of Ashford, Kent, England.

Opened in 1943, Woodchurch was a prototype for the type of temporary Advanced landing ground type airfield which would be built in France after D-Day, when the need for advanced landing fields would become urgent as the Allied forces moved east across France and Germany. It was used by the Royal Air Force and the United States Army Air Forces. It was closed in September 1944.

Today the airfield is a mixture of agricultural fields with no recognizable remains.

== History ==
The following units were here at some point:

- No. 128 Airfield Headquarters RAF controlling:
  - No. 231 Squadron RAF with the North American Mustang I (July - October 1943)
  - No. 400 Squadron RCAF with the North American Mustang I (July - October 1943)
- No. 414 Squadron RCAF with the Mustang I (October 1943)
- No. 2809 Squadron RAF Regiment

The USAAF Ninth Air Force required several temporary Advanced Landing Ground (ALG) along the channel coast prior to the June 1944 Normandy invasion to provide tactical air support for the ground forces landing in France.

=== USAAF use ===
While under USAAF control, Woodchurch was known as USAAF Station AAF-419 for security reasons, and by which it was referred to instead of location. Its Station-ID was "WC".

==== 373rd Fighter Group ====
In the first week of April 1944, the 373d Fighter Group arrived from Richmond Army Air Base, Virginia operating Republic P-47 Thunderbolts. Operational fighter squadrons and fuselage codes were:

- 410th Fighter Squadron (R3)
- 411th Fighter Squadron (U9)
- 412th Fighter Squadron (V5)

The 373d Fighter Group was part of the 303d Fighter Wing, XIX Tactical Air Command.

Movement to France took place in late July and most of the personnel and aircraft had left for Tour-en-Bessin (ALG A-13) by 31 June.

Woodchurch did not miss out as a haven for disabled bombers. On 29 June, a 458th Bomb Group Liberator landed without its nosewheel down, causing irreparable damage to the aircraft and urgent work for the runway repair crew, and another ailing B-24 put down safely on 19 July.

== Current use ==
The area was fully returned to agriculture by the following year. Today, there is no physical evidence of the airfield, as the land has been redeveloped into either agricultural fields or meadows. The only way which the location of RAF Woodchurch can be determined is by comparing the road network on aerial photos of the airfield when it was active to the road network today. However, a privately owned airstrip does run parallel to the original main runway (01 - 19) and some evidence of the original dispersal standings can be seen from the air.

== See also ==
- List of former Royal Air Force stations
