= 146th Operations Group =

146th Operations Group

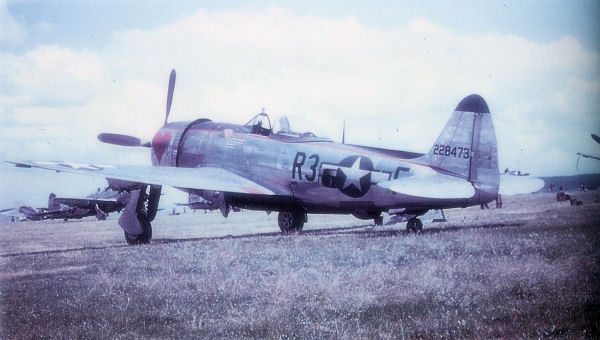
- Group P-47D Thunderbolt at RAF Woodchurch (Note: Aircraft is Republic P-47D-28-RA Thunderbolt, R3-F, Dorothy K, serial 42-28473 of the 410th Fighter Squadron. This plane survived the war and as late as 1996 was at the Planes of Fame (East) in Minneapolis. Dirkx, Marco (30 July 2025). "1942 USAF Serial Numbers". Joe Baugher’s Serial Number List.)
- Active: 1943–1945; 1946–1953; 1953–1970; 1970–1975; 1993–present
- Country: United States
- Branch: Air National Guard
- Type: Airlift
- Part of: California Air National Guard
- Garrison/HQ: Channel Islands Air National Guard Station, California
- Decorations: Distinguished Unit Citation; Air Force Outstanding Unit Award

Insignia
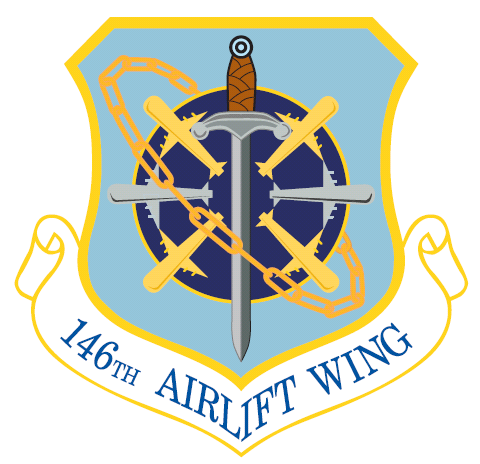
- 146th Operations Group emblem (Note: While assigned to the 146th Wing, the group uses the wing emblem with the group designation on the scroll. AF Instruction 84-105, Organizational Lineage, Honors and History, 27 April 2017, paragraph 3.3.3.)

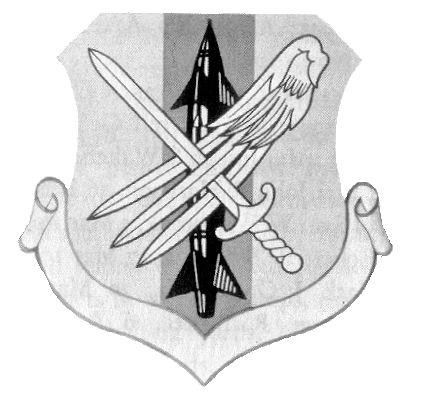
- 146th Fighter-Interceptor Group emblem (Note: Approved 21 June 1957)

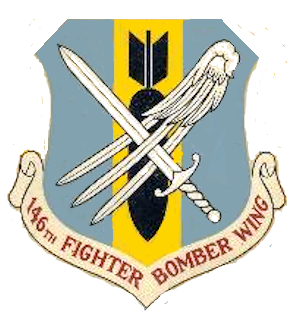
- 146th Fighter-Bomber Group emblem

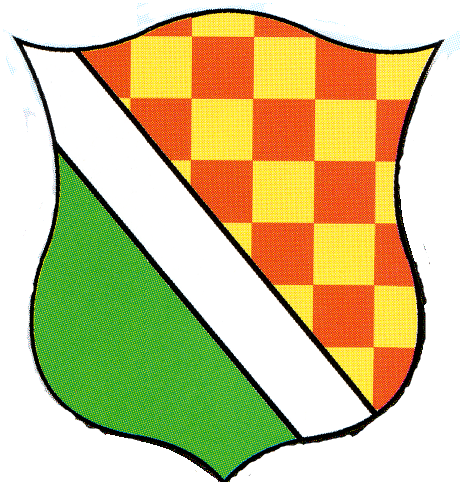
- 373rd Fighter Group emblem

The 146th Operations Group is an active California Air National Guard unit, stationed at Channel Islands Air National Guard Station, California. It was first activated as the 373rd Fighter Group. The group was formed during World War II. After training in the United States, the group moved to the European Theater of Operations, where it became part of Ninth Air Force. It was awarded a Distinguished Unit Citation for a mission on 20 March 1945. After V-E Day, the group returned to the United States, where it was inactivated.

The 373rd was redesignated as the 146th Fighter Group, was activated in the California National Guard in 1946. The group was called to active duty for the Korean War in 1951, but remained in the United States until returning to state control in 1953. It served as a fighter aircraft unit until 1960, when it transitioned to the airlift mission. The group was inactivated in 1975, but was activated in its current role in 1993.

== History ==
=== World War II ===
==== Training in the United States ====
The 373rd Fighter Group was activated at Westover Field, Massachusetts, on 15 August 1943. Its original squadrons were the 410th, 411th, and 412th Fighter Squadrons. The cadre for the 373rd was supplied by the 326th Fighter Group. Training for the group with Republic P-47 Thunderbolts began at Westover Field in September 1943 and was continued at Norfolk Army Air Field, Virginia in October.

On 12 February 1944 the group's training ended and the organization prepared for departure overseas. The group moved to Camp Shanks, New York, on 15 March. One week later the unit's personnel sailed for Great Britain aboard the SS Duchess of Bedford. The ship reached Greenock, Scotland on 3 April, and the group moved to their new station at RAF Woodchurch, Kent, England.

==== Combat in Europe ====
During the remainder of the month the group prepared for combat operations by flying training missions. Some pilots, in order to gain experience, participated in missions with the 358th Fighter Group. The group flew its first combat mission, a fighter sweep over the coast of France, on 8 May 1944. Three days later the unit escorted a group of Martin B-26 Marauders to France. Then, on 21 May, the unit participated in its first strike into Germany, when 50 of its Thunderbolts conducted a fighter sweep over the lower Ruhr Valley.

The unit met its first enemy air opposition on the mission of 24 May, when it was attacked by seven Focke-Wulf Fw 190s while escorting bombers to Belgium. Three days later the group completed its first dive bombing mission. The group flew escort missions for B-26 Marauders attacking airfields, railroads and bridges preparing for Operation Overlord, the invasion of Normandy. It flew fourteen missions on D-Day when it patrolled the beaches and provided top cover for other outfits in dive-bombing attacks against enemy targets. In the days succeeding the successful establishment of the Normandy beachhead the 373rd Group swept behind enemy lines, attacking motor convoys, troops, transportation facilities, and other tactical and interdiction targets, in an effort to isolate the battlefield.

The group left Woodchurch on 4 July and were established at Tour-en-Bessin Airfield on 19 July. Although the group was primarily concerned with ground support and interdiction operations, it engaged the enemy in aerial combat on several occasions. On 7 June, one day after the landings, the 410th Squadron accounted for three aerial victories. On 29 June, while the 411th Fighter Squadron was providing top cover for a dive-bombing strike against rolling stock in the Le Mans-Tours area, its pilots ran into seven Messerschmitt Bf 109s. In the battle which ensued the 411th's pilots chalked up five aerial victories.

The movement of the group to France hindered its operations during the latter part of July. However, in August the group completed 94 missions. Most of those missions were in support of General George Patton's United States Third Army, which during the month burst out of Normandy and into Brittany, liberated all of that peninsula except three port cities, and swept 140 miles (230 km) past Paris to within 60 miles (97 km) of the German border. During the advance across France the 373rd provided "umbrella cover" for the advancing ground forces, knocked out enemy rail and railroad transportation, and struck again and again at enemy tanks, gun emplacements, troop concentrations, and strongpoints.

Late in August and early in September the 373rd Fighter Group devoted much of its attention to attacking German fortifications at Brest. The old fortifications of that city had been reinforced by the Germans and presented a barrier to American troops. In spite of repeated air attacks and shellings, the enemy still held on to its position. In addition to continuing attacks with medium bombers, Ninth Air Force directed eight fighter groups, including the 373rd, consisting of approximately 400 planes, to provide air cooperation for the troops assaulting the city. Continuous dive-bombing and strafing attacks finally forced the enemy to withdraw into the city. In the final phase of the assault the 373rd attacked enemy strongpoints which were obstructing the progress of our ground troops.

After 12 September the group returned to supporting the front line elements of General Patton's Third Army. Despite the fact that the unit's base was far from the front lines, it completed 67 dive-bombing and reconnaissance missions—some of them to targets as far away as Luxembourg and Saarbrücken. On 1 October 1944 the group was transferred from XIX Tactical Air Command to the provisional XXIX Tactical Air Command. Thereafter the 373rd sought to isolate the front line battle areas by cutting rails and by destroying bridges and other transportation targets; and it gave direct ground support to elements of the Ninth Army by hitting enemy strongpoints, tanks, and gun positions.

Late in October the group moved to Le Culot Airfield, where it was located when the Germans began the breakthrough which resulted in the Battle of the Bulge. From 19 to 23 December, unfavorable weather conditions shield the Germans from air attacks. On 24 December the weather cleared and the group flew attacks in support of ground forces through the remainder of December and into January 1945.

Throughout that entire battle the 373rd Group played a small but significant role. Despite snow, fog, freezing rain, and cold weather, the group flew 13 missions during the month of January. By February 1945 the Germans were retreating rapidly. To prevent the Germans from forming a line of defense, the group flew armed reconnaissance missions, making repeated attacks against the enemy's retreating columns and against transportation targets behind enemy lines. During the month the group destroyed a total of 605 buildings, 412 railroad cars, 12 locomotives, 88 motor vehicles, and 2 tanks. The unit also made 193 railroad and road cuts. and it attacked bridges, supply dumps. ammunition stores, gun positions, and pockets of resistance. Operations continued until the war ended early in May 1945.

On 20 March 1945, the group's pilots destroyed or damaged 119 enemy aircraft on the ground. It greatly facilitated Operation Lumberjack, the general assault across the Rhine, repeatedly attacking through heavy flak in attacks against airfields east of the river and blocking lines of communication with attacks on rail lines and rolling stock without the loss of a single fighter. For this action the group was awarded a Distinguished Unit Citation. (Note: The citation reads: "For outstanding and heroic performance of duty in action against the enemy in the European Theater of Operations on 20 March 1945, this organization, displaying great valor and exemplary devotion to duty, greatly facilitated the crossing of the Rhine River by Allied Ground Forces by dealing six consecutive blows against the enemy's air potential and by crushing his lines of communication. The group destroyed and damaged one hundred nineteen enemy aircraft on three vital airfields which presented the greatest threat to Allied armies massed west of the Rhine, and rendered these airfields completely inoperative. With unswerving resolution, pilots dived repeatedly through the barrages of anti-aircraft to batter strategic targets, then, with brilliant airmanship and superior flying skill, returned all aircraft safely to base. In a further display of outstanding aerial tactics, the 373rd Fighter Group tenaciously and aggressively attacked rolling stock, motor transportation, and utterly disrupted main highways and rail lines leading to the Rhine. The ingenuity, efficiency, and cooperation on the part of all personnel contributed in the fullest measure to the devastation wreaked by the 373rd Fighter Group on this significant day. The outstanding performance, achieved through the superb esprit de corps of this unit, is in keeping with the highest traditions of the Army Air Forces.”)

When the war ended the 373rd Fighter Group was stationed at Lippstadt Airfield, Germany. Later in the month the unit moved to AAF Station Illesheim. Germany, where it remained until in July. The group then moved back to England, where, on 25 July, it boarded the USS West Point (AP-23) and sailed for the United States. After arriving at the Hampton Roads Port of Embarkation on 1 August, the Group moved to Camp Patrick Henry, Virginia. On the following day the 373rd was transferred to Sioux Falls Army Air Field. South Dakota. The group's stay at that base was short, for on 17 August it moved to Seymour Johnson Field, North Carolina, and then to Mitchel Field, New York, on 28 September. Less than two months later, on 7 November 1945, the 373rd Fighter Group was inactivated.

373rd Fighter Group

Aerial Victories	Number	Note
Group Hq	3.5
410th Fighter Squadron	23
411 Fighter Squadron	45.5
412th Fighter Squadron	38
Group Total	110

=== California Air National Guard ===
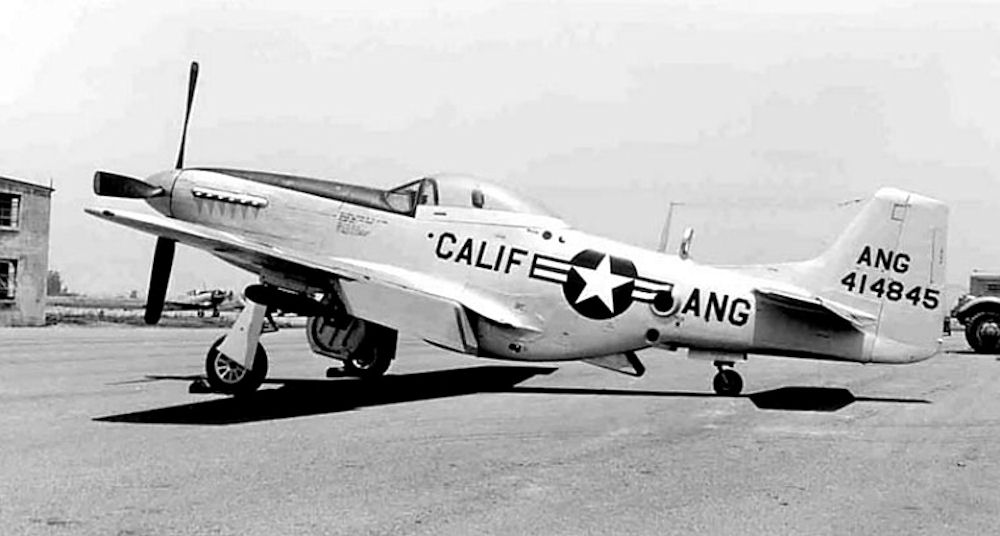
196th Fighter Squadron P-51D Mustang 44-14845, Norton Air Force Base

The group was redesignated the 146th Fighter Group, and allotted to the Air National Guard, on 24 May 1946. It was organized at Van Nuys Airport on 15 August 1946. The group was extended federal recognition on 16 September and assigned to the 62nd Fighter Wing.

Upon activation, the group was equipped with North American F-51D Mustangs, with a mission of air defense of Southern California and Arizona and moved into several buildings and hangars vacated just a few months previously by the 441st Army Air Force Base Unit.

==== 146th Composite Wing ====
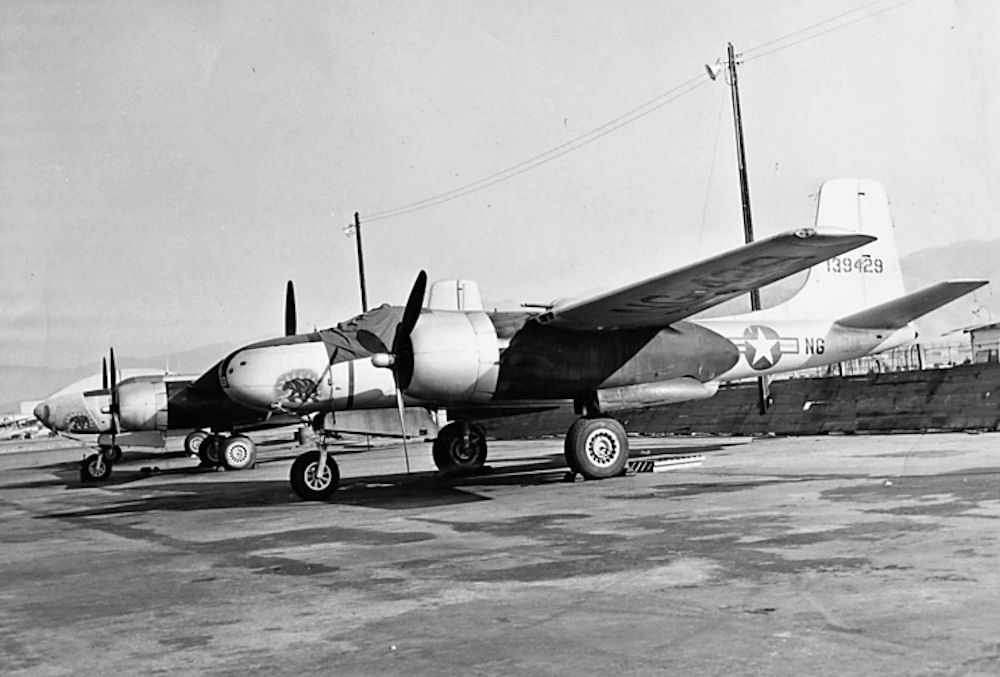
B-26B of the 115th Bombardment Squadron, Van Nuys Airport, 1950 (Note: Aircraft is Douglas B-26B-35-DL Invader, serial 41-39429. In 1956, this plane was transferred to the Cuban Air Force. Dirkx, Marco (6 May 2025). "1941 USAF Serial Numbers". Joe Baugher’s Serial Number List.)

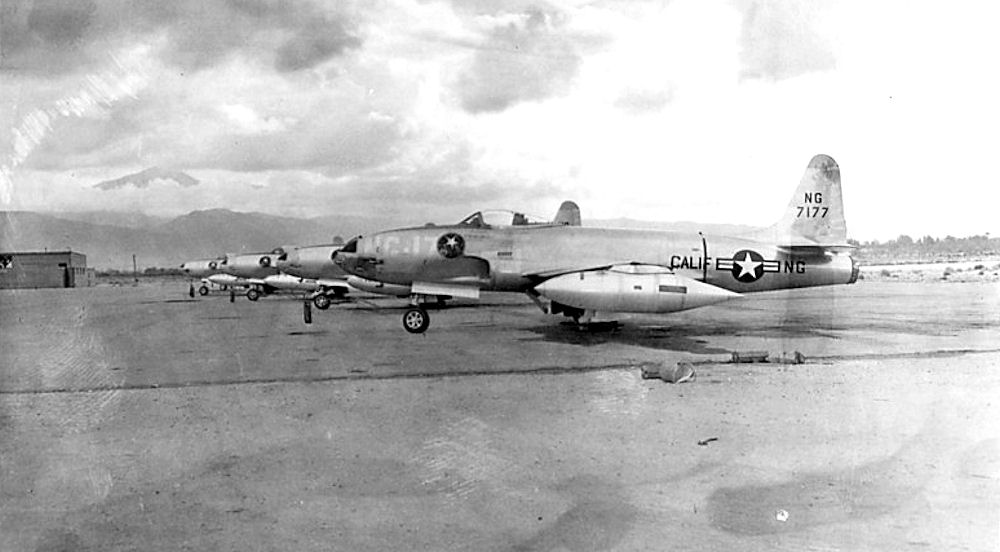
196th Fighter Squadron F-80C Shooting Star (Note: Aircraft is Lockheed F-80C-1-LO Shooting Star, serial 47-177. This airplane was converted to a QF-80F drone and destroyed on 16 February 1961. Dirkx, Marco (23 April 2025). "1947 USAF Serial Numbers". Joe Baugher’s Serial Number List.)

At the end of October 1950, the National Guard converted to the wing base organization. As a result, the 62d Fighter Wing was inactivated on 31 October 1950. The 146th Composite Wing was established, allotted to the state of California, and activated on 1 November 1950; assuming the personnel, equipment, and mission of the inactivated 62d Wing. The group was redesignated the 146th Composite Group and assigned to the new wing as its operational group. The 115th Bombardment Squadron was transferred to the group. However, in February 1951, the 115th was reassigned and the group reverted to its earlier designation as a fighter group.

==== Korean War federalization ====
After the surprise invasion of South Korea on 25 June 1950, most of the Air National Guard was federalized starting in the fall of 1950. The group's 196th Fighter Squadron at Norton Air Force Base had begun equipping with Lockheed F-80 Shooting Stars in 1948, was called to active duty toward the end of October. In February 1951, the group's remaining 195th and 197th Fighter Squadrons were also mobilized.

The 146th Group was not federalized until 1 April 1951. On 17 April, it became part of Strategic Air Command (SAC) and moved to Moody Air Force Base, Georgia. At Moody, it was assigned the 178th, 186th and 190th Fighter Squadrons, all equipped with the F-51 Mustang. The group was redesignated the 146th Fighter-Bomber Group on 1 June 1951. In November 1951, the group moved to George Air Force Base, California, where it became part of Tactical Air Command (TAC). At George, the group prepared to transition to North American F-86 Sabres, but it was inactivated on 1 January 1953, and its equipment and personnel transferred to the 21st Fighter-Bomber Group, which was simultaneously activated.

==== Fighter operations ====
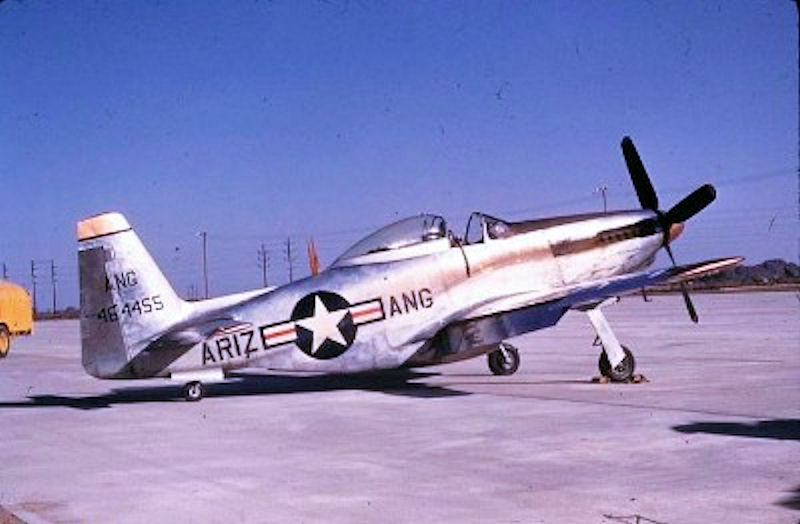
197th Fighter Squadron F-51H Mustang, AF Ser. No. 44-64455

The group was returned to California State control, and on 1 January 1953, the 146th was reformed at Van Nuys Airport. With the end of combat in Korea, jet-propelled aircraft began to be made available to the Air National Guard. In 1953, the 195th Squadron received North American F-86A Sabres. The 115th Squadron upgraded to F-86As in late 1953. The group completed its upgrade in 1954, when the 196th at Norton Air Force Base and the 197th at Luke Air Force Base upgraded to F-86As. Although designated as a fighter-bomber group until 1955, the group augmented Air Defense Command (ADC), standing dusk-to-dawn alerts. On 1 January 1954, the 196th moved from Norton to Ontario Municipal Airport.

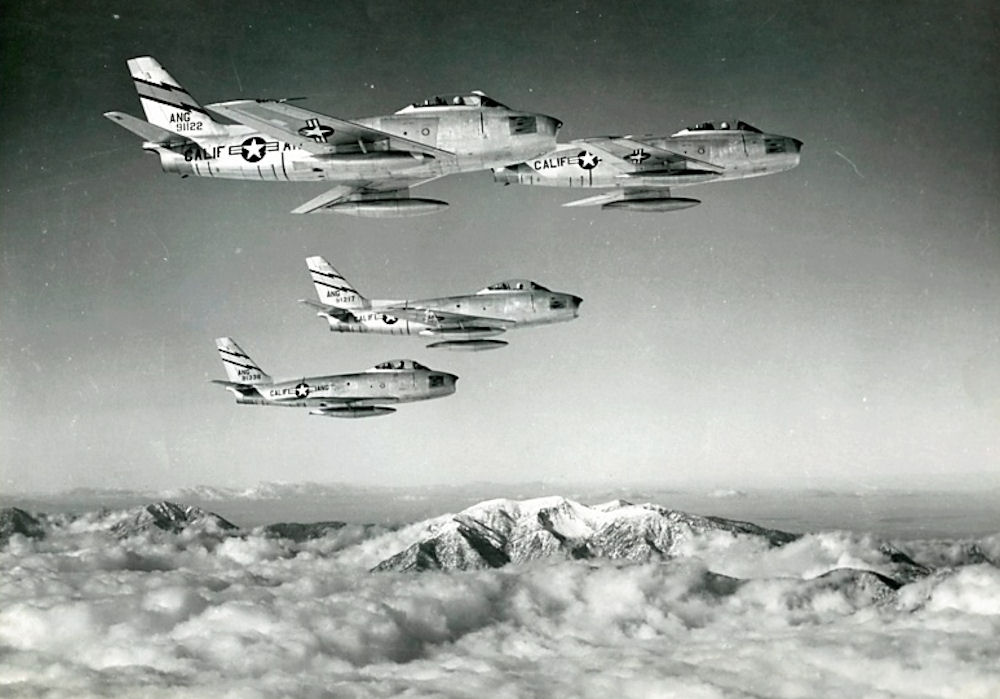
Group F-86A Sabres (Note: Lead aircraft is North American F-86A-5-NA Sabre, serial 49-1122)

The 146th was redesignated the 146th Fighter-Interceptor Group on 1 July 1955. In April 1958, the group transitioned to the North American F-86L Sabre, which was designed from the onset as an interceptor and had data link to be controlled by the Semi-Automatic Ground Environment control centers.

ADC had organized its dispersed fighter squadrons and their support elements under independent groups since 1953. In 1956, Air National Guard squadrons augmenting ADC began reorganizing along the same lines. In October 1957, the 161st Fighter Group (Air Defense) was organized at Luke to command the 197th Squadron, and in May 1958, the 163d Fighter Group (Air Defense) activated at Ontario as the headquarters for the 196th. The 146th Group and its remaining 115th and 195th Squadrons converted to fighter-bomber models of the Sabre, and the group became the 146th Tactical Fighter Group later in 1958.

==== Airlift Operations ====
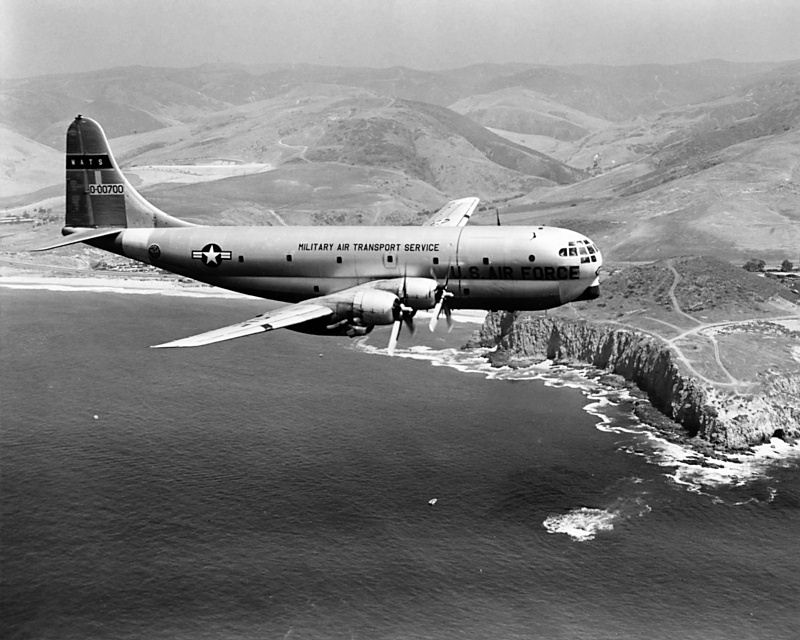
115th Air Transport Squadron C-97C Stratofreighter along the California coastline (Note: Aircraft is Boeing C-97C-35-BO Stratofreighter, serial 50-700. This plane was trasnferred to the Military Aircraft Storage and Disposition Center on 10 April 1964 and declared surplus three months later.Dirkx, Marco (10 April 2024). "1950 USAF Serial Numbers". Joe Baugher’s Serial Number List.)

In 1961, the group traded its Sabres for Boeing C-97 Stratofreighter transports and was redesignated the 146th Air Transport Group. During the Berlin Crisis of 1961, the group was federalized on 1 October 1961. On federalization, the group's squadrons were transferred directly to the 146th Wing, conforming to the organizational model followed by Military Air Transport Service (MATS). The wing augmented MATS airlift capability worldwide. The group returned to California state control on 31 August 1962. Throughout the 1960s, the unit flew long-distance transport missions in support of Air Force requirements, frequently sending aircraft to Hawaii, Japan, the Philippines, and, during the Vietnam War, to both South Vietnam, Okinawa, and Thailand.

By the law at the time Guardsmen could only be activated as members of a mobilized unit. This meant that, even when only operational and maintenance elements were needed for mobilization, the entire “augmented squadron” had to be called to active duty, including unneeded administrative personnel. The response was to replace the “augmented squadron” with a group including functional squadrons that could be mobilized as a group, or individually. Shortly after the 146th's return to state control, the 195th Air Transport Group was formed to command the 195th Squadron and its supporting elements.

The C-97s were retired in 1970 and the unit transitioned to the Lockheed C-130A Hercules theater transport, flying missions in support of TAC throughout the United States and Alaska. In 1973, the C-130A models were transferred to the Republic of Vietnam Air Force and they were replaced by the C-130B. In 1975, National Guard groups located on the same station as their parent wing were regarded an unneeded level of management. The group was inactivated on 9 February and its subordinate units were reassigned to the 146th Tactica Airlist Wing.

==== Reactivation ====
In 1993, the Air National Guard adopted the Objective Wing reorganization of the regular Air Force, as a result, the group was reactivated as the 146th Operations Group and assigned to the 146th Airlift Wing.

Since the 11 September attacks, group personnel and aircraft have been involved in mobility operations, providing intra-theater airlift within Afghanistan, Iraq, and surrounding countries. Group airmen have been deployed almost constantly since 2001, for periods of up to six months at a time. The unit was also heavily involved in the fight against ISIS providing re-upply and transport capabilities to the US military and its allies to locations in Syria, Iraq, and Jordan. Most recently, unit airmen supported operations in the Horn of Africa.

Early 2020 brought Covid-19 to the United States and the group responded by transporting over 400 ventilators to locations across the Eastern United States, providing much needed medical equipment to locations that were severely lacking it.

In addition to fighting Covid-19, the group transported National Guard soldiers and airmen to locations across Californiae to provide security and assistance to civil authorities if required by protests. "The unit engaged in 63 hours of flying time to move 1,574 National Guard members along with 364,600 pounds of supplies in C-130J Super Hercules aircraft." This immense operation occurred within a span of 72 hours and marked the largest troop movement in California Air National Guard History.

==== Modular Airborne Fire Fighting System (MAFFS) ====
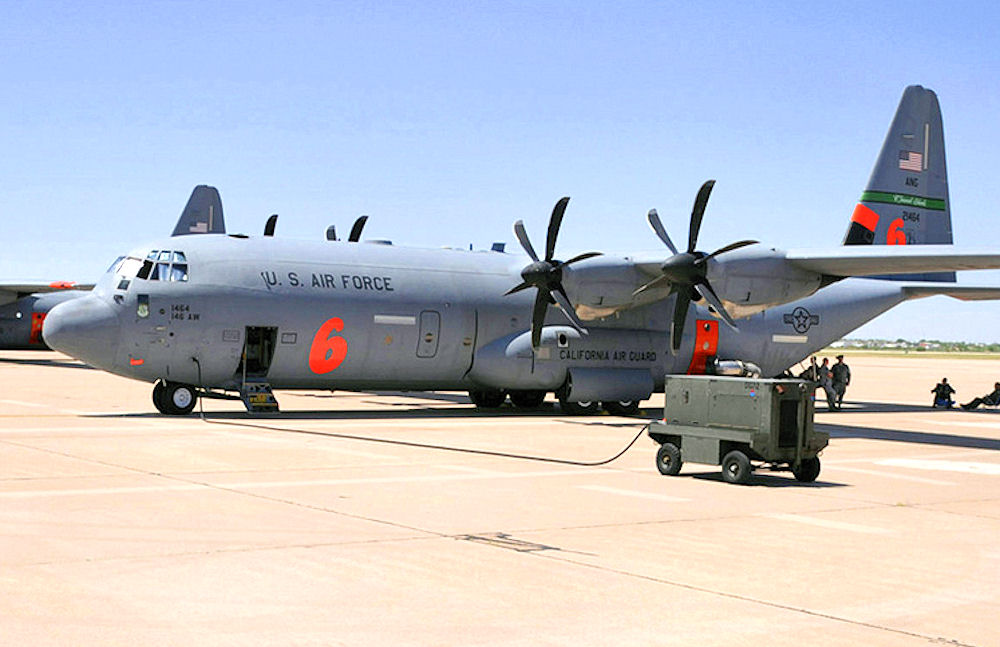
146th Airlift Wing Modular Airborne Fire Fighting System C-130J Hercules aerial firefighter

The 146th is one of only four C-130 Air Guard and AF Reserve units whose contribution to the nation's aerial fire fighting capability includes equipment and techniques for efficient, effective suppression of large wildland fires from the air. Since 1974, using the Modular Airborne Fire Fighting System (MAFFS) units supplied by the U.S. Forest Service and mounted in four C-130s, the group aerial fire fighting crews have been credited with saving lives and structures, forests, and brush land, taking part in over 5,000 aerial firefighting missions. The Malibu fires of 1993 literally burned to the edge of the group's base. In 1994, with over 55,000 wildfires raging throughout the western States, the 146th, along with three other MAFFS-equipped units flew nearly 2,000 missions, dropping fifty-one million pounds of fire retardant. The 146th has been involved in every major wildfire in recent history, to include the Thomas Fire, the Woolsey Fire, the August Complex Fire, the Dixie Fire, the Mendocino Complex Fire and the Rim Fire.

== Lineage ==
146th Military Airlift Group

- Constituted as the 373rd Fighter Group on 25 May 1943

Activated on 15 August 1943
Redesignated 373rd Fighter Group, Single Engine on 28 April 1944
Inactivated on 7 November 1945
Redesignated 146th Fighter Group, Single Engine and allotted to the National Guard on 24 May 1946.
Activated on 15 August 1946
Extended federal recognition on 16 September 1946
Redesignated 146th Composite Group on 1 November 1950
Redesignated: 146th Fighter Group on 1 February 1951
Federalized and placed on active duty on 1 March 1951
Redesignated: 146th Fighter-Bomber Group on 1 June 1951
Inactivated on 1 January 1953
Released from active duty and returned to California state control, 11 December 1952
Redesignated 146th Fighter-Interceptor Group on 1 July 1955
Redesignated 146th Air Transport Group, Heavy on 1 October 1961
Federalized and placed on active duty on 1 October 1961
Released from active duty and returned to California state control on 31 August 1962
Redesignated 146th Military Airlift Group on 1 January 1966
Inactivated c. 11 April 1970
Consolidated with the 146th Tactical Airlift Group

146th Operations Group

- Constituted as the 146th Tactical Airlift Group on 30 December 1969

Activated c. 11 April 1970
Inactivated 30 June 1974
Consolidated with the 146th Military Airlift Group
Redesignated 146th Operations Group
Activated c. 1 January 1993

=== Assignments ===
- I Fighter Command, 15 August 1943 (attached to New York Fighter Wing after 15 March 1944)
- XIX Tactical Air Command, 4 April 1944
- XXIX Tactical Air Command (Proisional), 1 October 1944
- Second Air Force, 4 August 1945
- First Air Force, 20 August – 7 November 1945
- California Air National Guard, 15 August 1946
- 62d Fighter Wing, 16 September 1946
- 146th Composite Wing (later 146th Fighter Wing, 146th Fighter-Bomber Wing), 1 November 1950 – 1 January 1953
- 146th Fighter-Bomber Wing (later 146th Fighter-Interceptor Wing, 146th Tactical Fighter Wing, 146th Air Transport Group, 146th Military Airlift Group) 1 January 1953 – c. 11 April 1970
- 146th Tactical Airlift Wing, c. 11 April 1970 – 9 February 1975
- 146th Airlift Wing, c. 1 January 1993 – present

=== Stations ===
- Westover Field, Massachusetts, 15 August 1943
- Norfolk Army Airfield, Virginia, 23 October 1943
- Richmond Army Air Base, Virginia, 15 February –
- Camp Shanks, New York, 15–22 March 1944
- RAF Woodchurch (AAF-419), England, 4 April – 4 July 1944
- Tour-en-Bessin Airfield (A-13), France, 19 July 1944
- Saint James Airfield (A-29), France, 19 August 1944
- Reims/Champagne Airfield (A-62), France, 19 September 1944
- Le Culot Airfield (A-89), Belgium, 22 October 1944
- Venlo Airfield (Y-55), Netherlands, 11 March 1945
- Lippstadt Airfield (Y-98), Germany, 20 April 1945
- AAF Station Illesheim (R-35), Germany, 20 May–July 1945
- Camp Patrick Henry, Virginia, 1–2 August 1944
- Sioux Falls Army Air Field, South Dakota, 4 August 1945
- Seymour Johnson Field, North Carolina, 20 August 1945
- Mitchel Field, New York, 28 September – 7 November 1945
- Van Nuys Airport, California, 16 September 1946
- Lockheed Air Terminal, Burbank, California, 1 November 1950
- Van Nuys Airport, California, 1 January 1951
- Moody Air Force Base, Georgia, 17 April 1951
- George Air Force Base, California, 25 October 1951 – 1 January 1953
- Van Nuys Airport, California, 1 January 1953 – c. 11 April 1970
- Van Nuys Airport, California, 1 January 1953 – c. 11 April 1970 – 9 February 1975
- Channel Islands Air National Guard Station, California, c. 1 January 1993 – present

=== Components ===
Operational Squadrons

115th Bombardment Squadron (later 115th Fighter-Bomber Squadron, 115th Fighter-Interceptor Squadron, 115th Tactical Fighter Squadron, 115th Air Transport Squadron, 115th Military Airlift Squadron, 115th Tactical Airlift Squadron, 115th Airlift Squadron, 1 November 1950 – 1 February 1951, 1 January 1953 – 1 October 1961, 31 August 1962 – c. 11 April 1970, c. 11 April 1970 – 9 February 1975, c. 1 January 1993 – present

- 178th Fighter Squadron (later 178th Fighter-Bomber Squadron), 17 April 1951 – 1 January 1953
- 186th Fighter Squadron (later 178th Fighter-Bomber Squadron), 17 April 1951 – 1 January 1953
- 190th Fighter Squadron (later 178th Fighter-Bomber Squadron), 17 April 1951 – 1 January 1953
- 195th Squadron: see 410th Fighter Squadron
- 196th Squadron: see 411th Fighter Squadron
- 197th Squadron: see 412th Fighter Squadron
- 410th Fighter Squadron (later 195th Fighter Squadron, 195th Fighter-Bomber Squadron, 195th Fighter-Interceptor Squadron), 15 August 1943 – 7 November 1945, 12 September 1946 – 1 February 1951, 1 January 1953 – 1 October 1961
- 411th Fighter Squadron (later 196th Fighter Squadron, 196th Fighter-Bomber Squadron, 196th Fighter-Interceptor Squadron), 15 August 1943 – 7 November 1945, 12 September 1946 – 10 October 1950, 1 January 1953 – 17 May 1958
- 412th Fighter Squadron (later 197th Fighter Squadron, 197th Fighter-Bomber Squadron, 197th Fighter-Inerceptor Squadron)), 15 August 1943 – 7 November 1945, 25 October 1946 – 1 February 1951, 1 January 1953 – 2 October 1957

Support units

- 146th Maintenance Squadron, 1 June 1951 – 14 January 1952
- 4453rd Armament & Electronics Maintenance Squadron, 1 June 1951 – 14 January 1952
- 4453rd Organizational Maintenance Squadron, 1 June 1951 – 14 January 1952

=== Aircraft ===
- Republic P-47 Thunderbolt, 1943–1945
- North American P-51 (later F-51) Mustang, 1946–1953, 1953–1954
- Lockheed F-80 Shooting Star, 1948–1950
- Lockheed T-33 T-Bird, 1951–1952
- Douglas C-47 Skytrain, 1951–1952
- North American F-86 Sabre, 1953–1961
- Boeing C-97 Stratofreighter, 1961, 1962–1970
- Lockheed C-130 Hercules, 1970–1975, 1993–present
