= Lippstadt Airfield =

Former German military airfield

Lippstadt Airfield (Y-98) Fliegerhorst Lippstadt
- North Rhine-Westphalia, Germany

Site information
- Type: Military airfield

Location
- Lippstadt Airfield (Germany)
- Coordinates: 51°42′40″N 008°22′12″E

Site history
- Built: 1936
- Built by: Luftwaffe
- In use: 1936–1945 (Luftwaffe); 1945 (United States Army Air Forces)

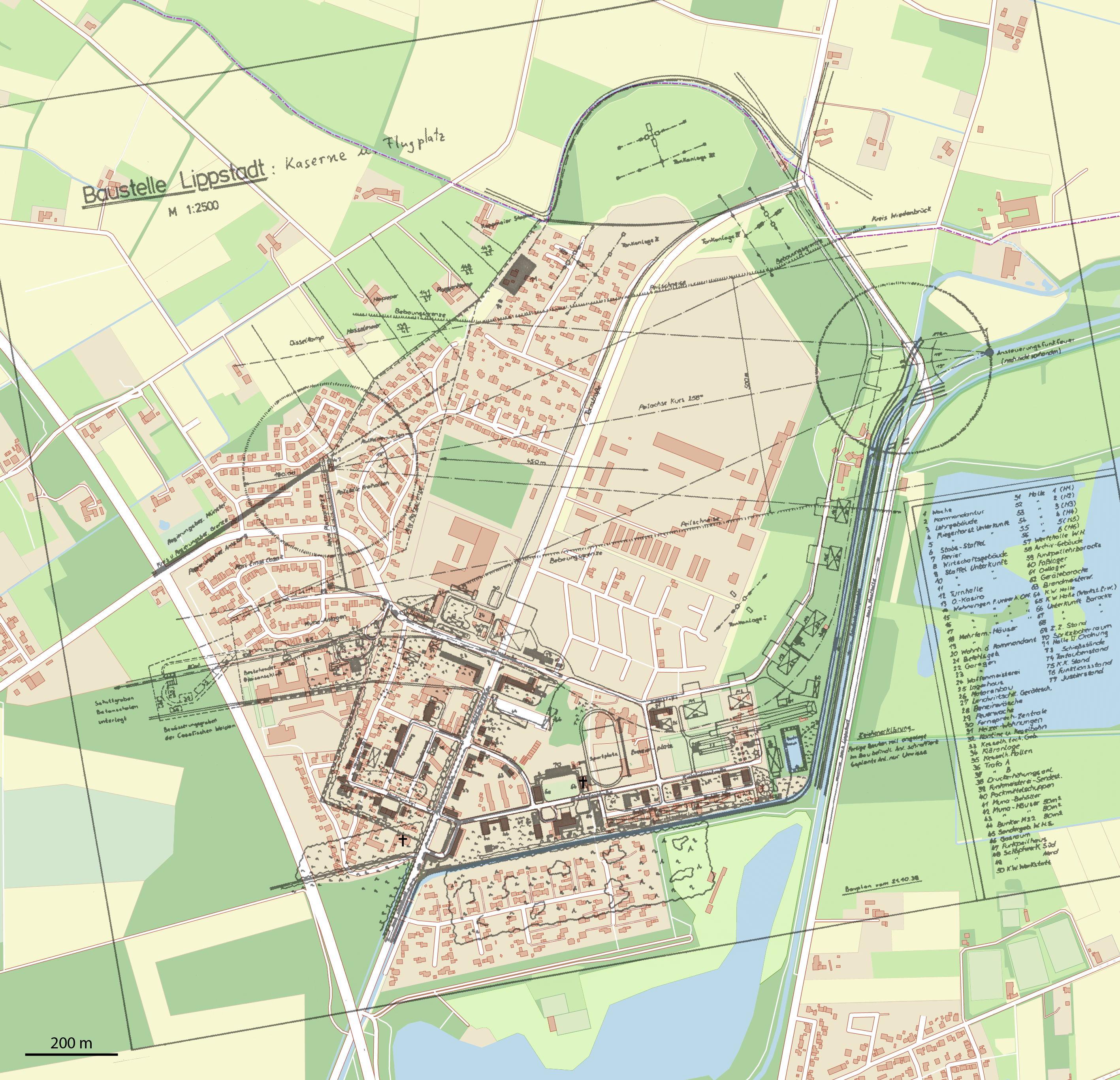
Building plan of the airfield from 1938, with underlay of the city map (state 2016)

For the civil airport opened in 1971, see Paderborn Lippstadt Airport

Lippstadt Airfield is a former military airfield located in Germany, located in the northern part of Lippstadt (Nordrhein-Westfalen); approximately 222 miles (357 km) west-southwest of Berlin.

Fliegerhorst Lippstadt was a pre-World War II Luftwaffe airfield, opening in 1936. Primarily a support airfield for most of the war, Anti-Aircraft FlaK (AAA) units were assigned and in 1944 it became a night interceptor airfield against Royal Air Force bomber attacks on Nazi Germany. It was seized by Allied ground forces in early April 1945 during the Western Allied invasion of Germany, being used as a combat airfield by the United States Army Air Forces until the end of the war. It was closed in July 1945.

== History ==
=== Origins ===
Fliegerhorst Lippstadt was opened in 1936, one of the first Luftwaffe airfields of the reconstituted German Air Force. It was opened as a fighter base, with Jagdgeschwader 132 (JG 132), being activated at the airfield in March, equipped with the Heinkel He 51, a biplane design which was the first fighter of the reborn Luftwaffe.

In addition to JG 132, many fighter units were organized at Lippstadt in the late 1930s, forming the core units of the wartime Luftwaffe. JG 134, also with He 51s and Arado Ar 68Es, another biplane fighter was formed a week later. In April 1937, Kampfgeschwader 254 (KG 254) was formed with Junkers Ju 52 transports, similar to the Douglas C-47; JG 142 in November 1938 with early-model Messerschmitt Bf 109C models; Zerstörergeschwader 142 (ZG 142), in January 1939 with Bf 109C and Ds, and ZG 26 in May 1939 also with Bf 109Ds. All of these units were deployed to other airfields around Germany, and most of them took part in the invasion of Poland in September 1939.

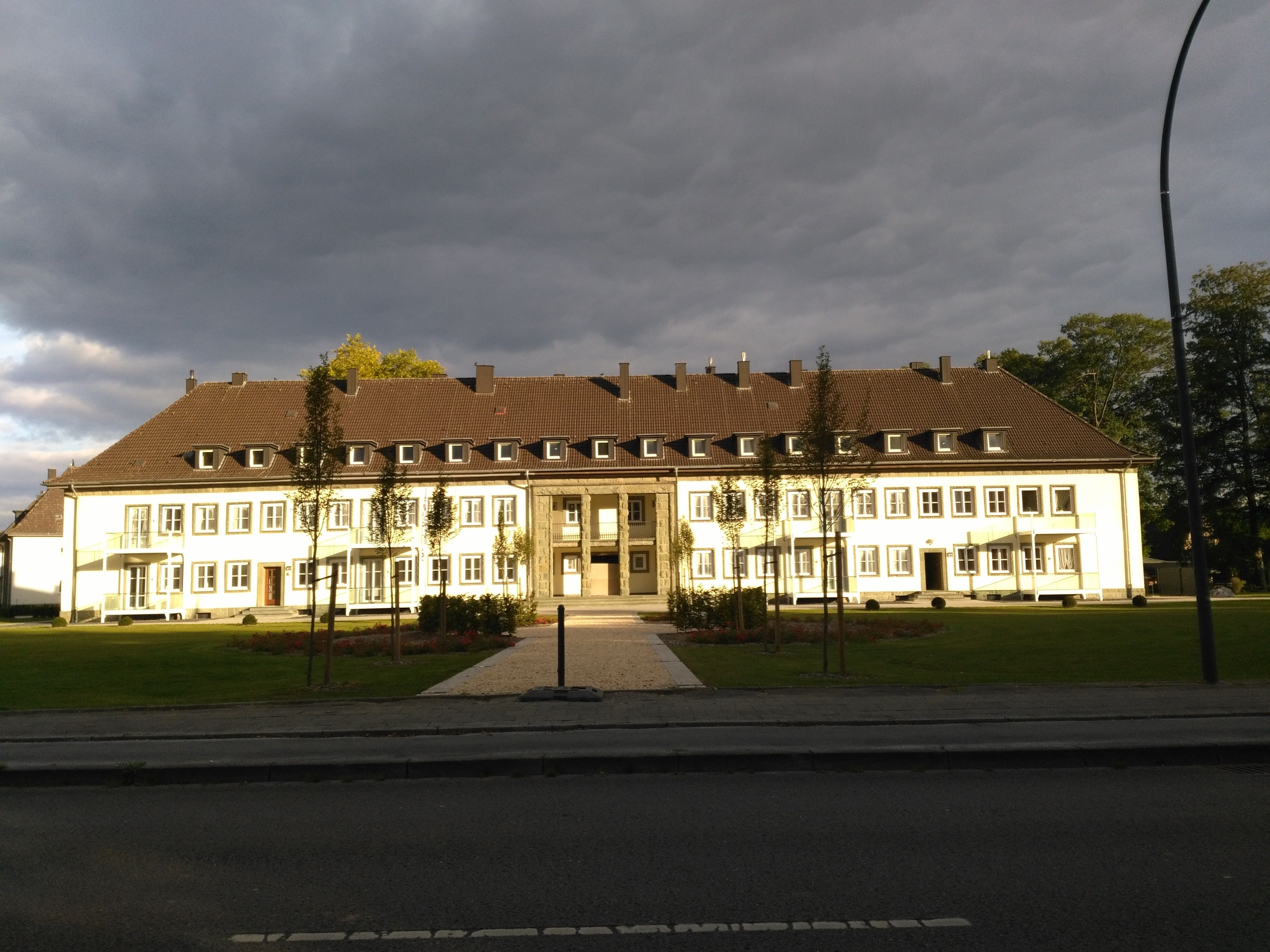
former commander's office (Mastholter Str.)

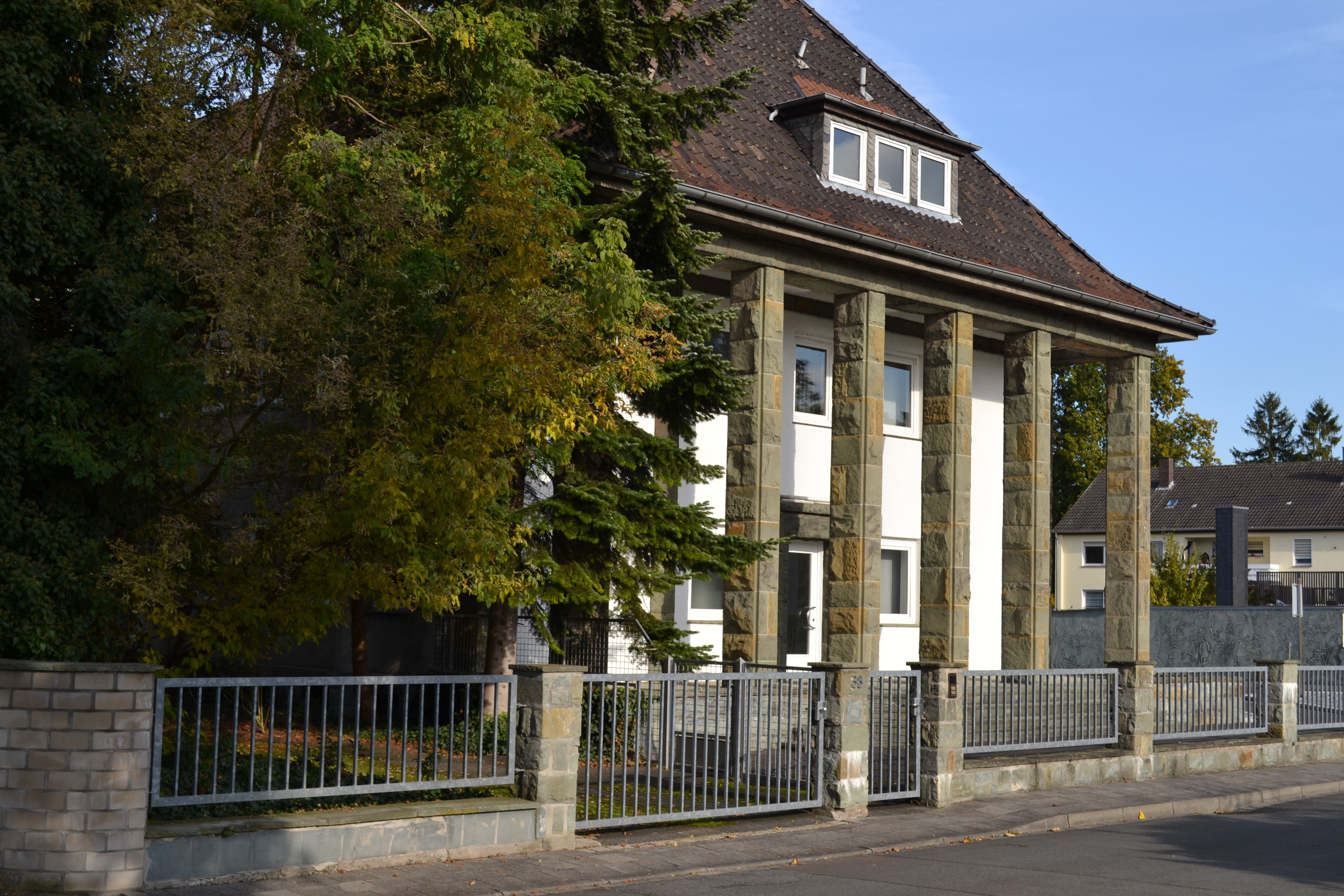
former officers' mess (Försterweg 36)

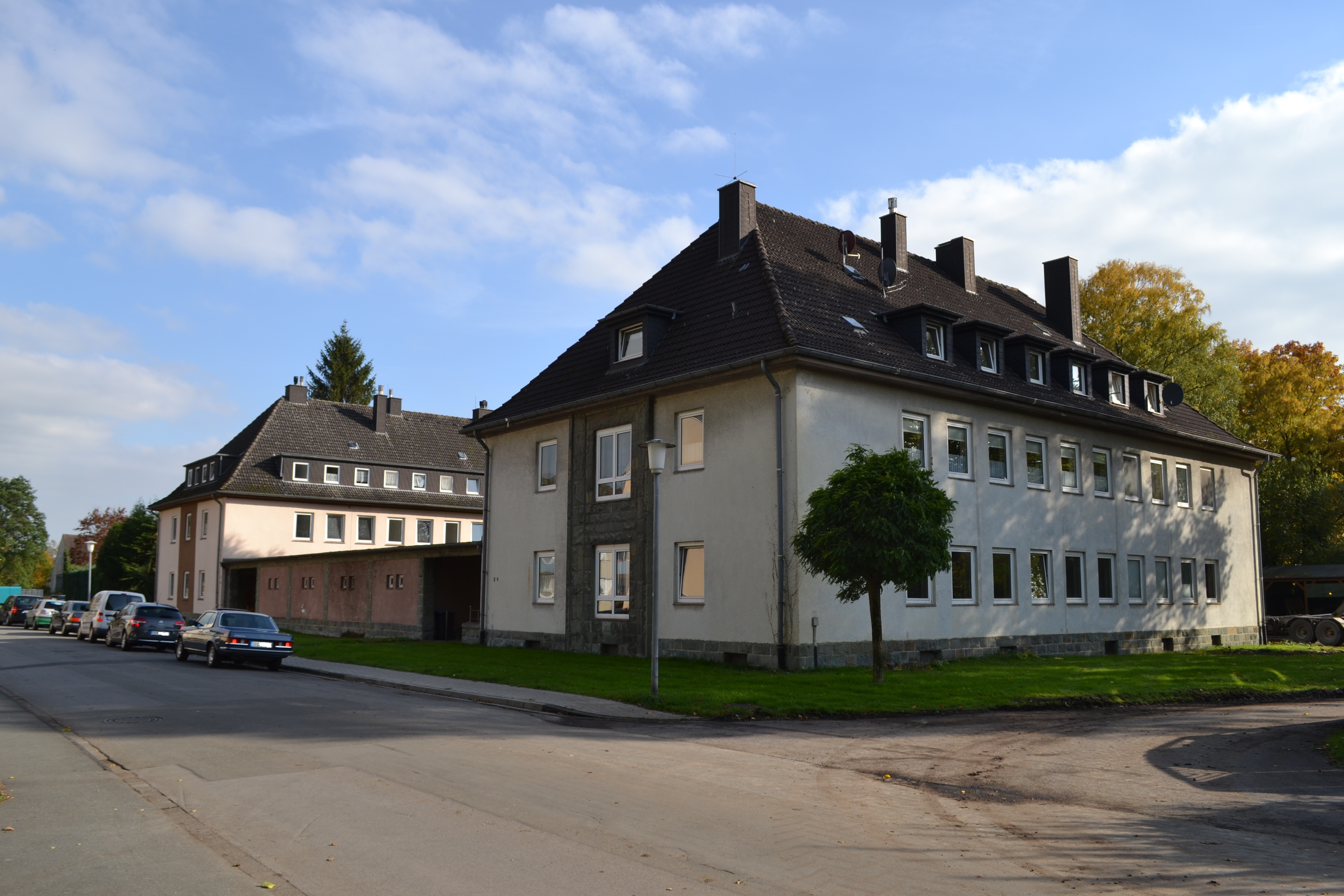
former crew accommodation (Richthofenstrasse)

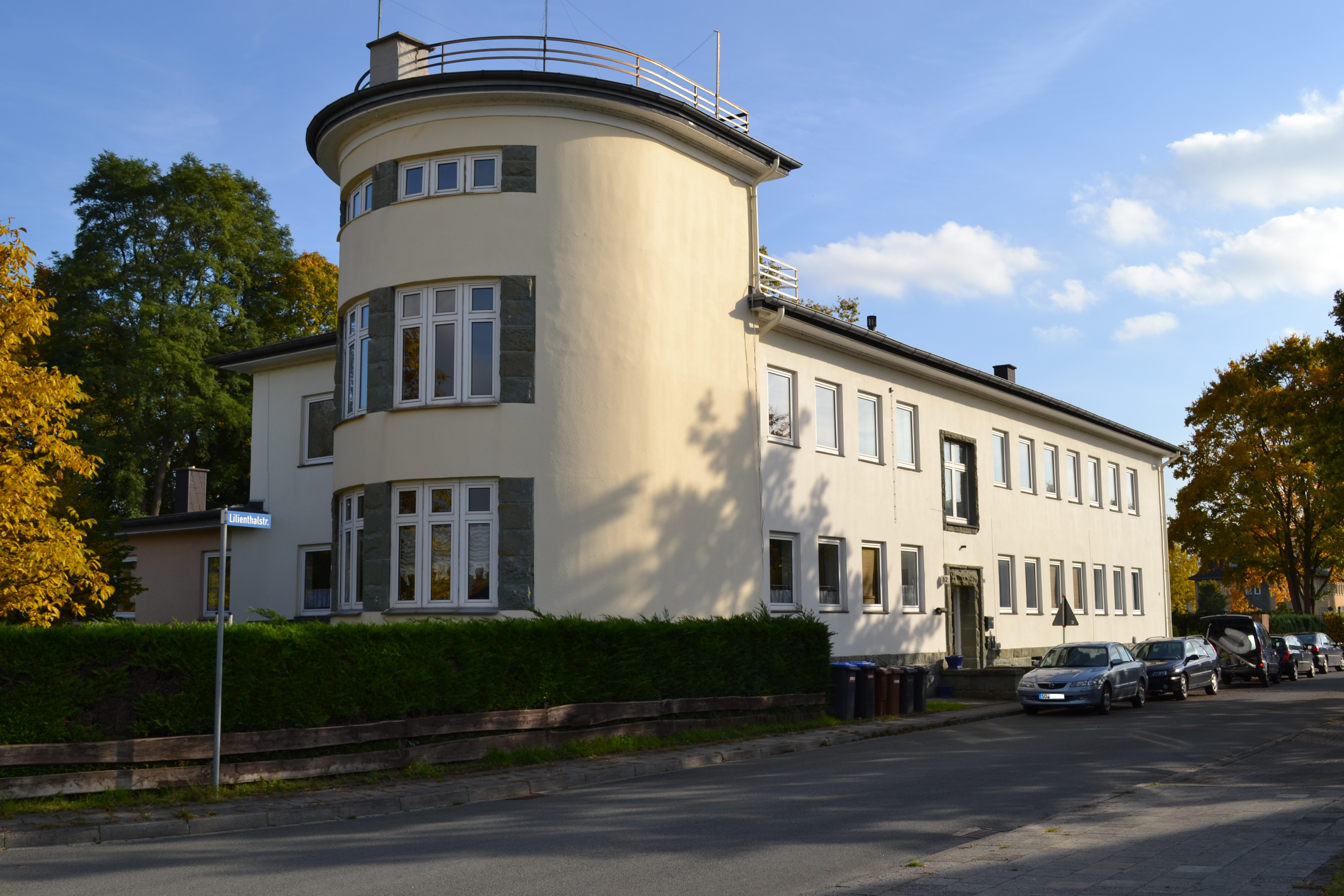
former air-traffic control centre (Lilienthalstr./Ringstr.)

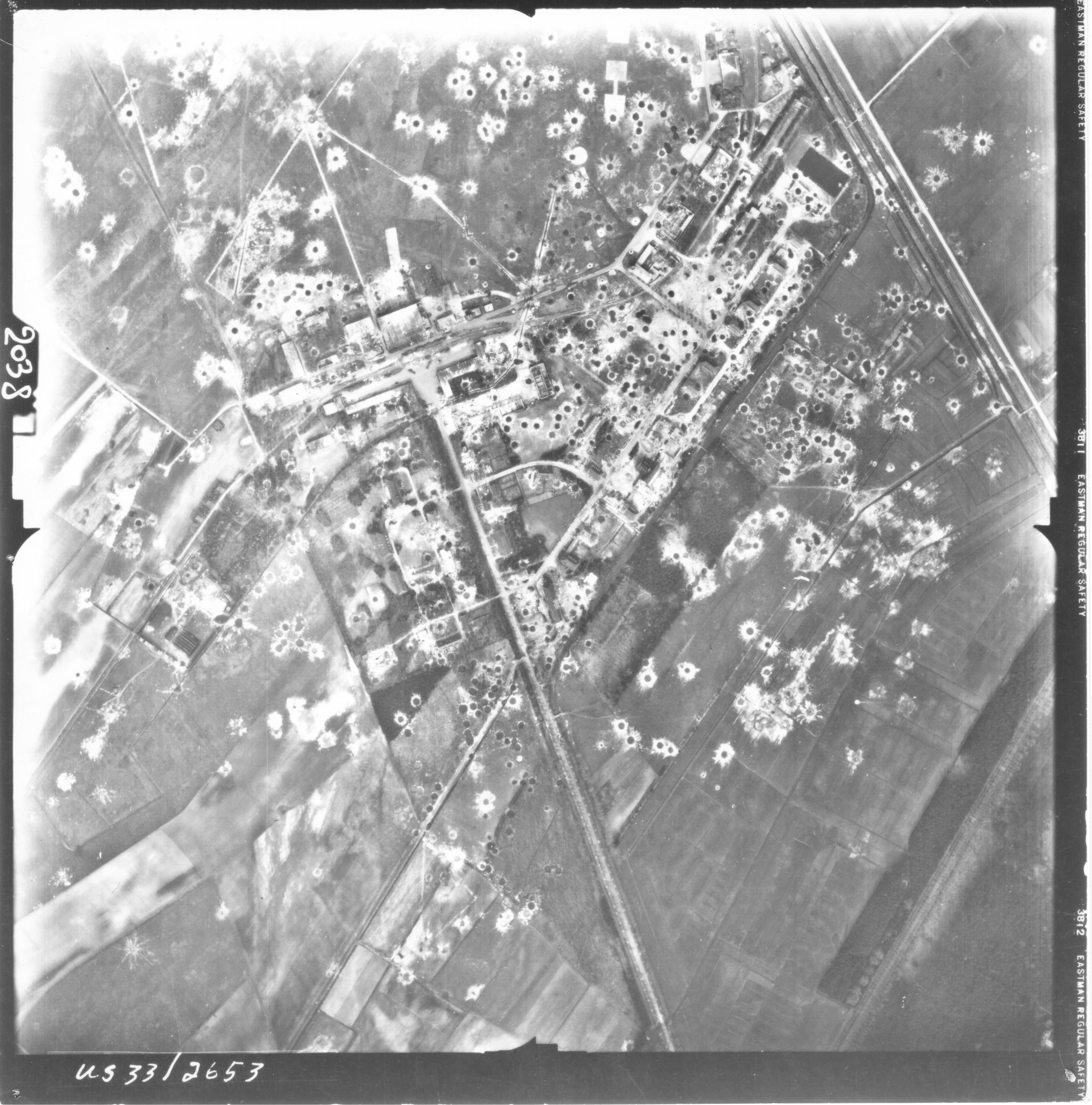
Aerial photograph of the airfield and barracks, taken 28 March 1945 by the US Air Force Reconnaissance

=== Luftwaffe use during World War II ===
With the Phony War underway after the invasion of Poland, Lippstadt became a training airfield for new Bf 109 pilots (Lehrgeschwader 2). Also a Messerschmitt Bf 110 combat unit aimed at France and the Low Countries (SKG 210) arrived in May 1941, which was used extensively in the Battle of France.

As the war moved away from Lippstadt, the base became a training facility for ground support pilots and other Luftwaffe personnel. Henschel Hs 129 "Tank Killer" aircraft of Schlachtgeschwader 1 (SG 1) were assigned, with the pilots moving mostly to the Eastern Front against the Soviet Union.

With the increasing Allied bomber attacks on Germany in 1944, Lippstadt was assigned to be part of the Defense of the Reich campaign by the Luftwaffe. Nachtjagdgeschwader 11 (NJG 11), with Bf 109Gs and Focke-Wulf Fw 190As, arrived in August 1944, performing night interceptor operations against Royal Air Force bombers attacking German targets.

The city of Lippstadt was a major rail transportation hub for the Deutsche Reichsbahn (DRB), and the railroad marshaling yards were targeted by Eighth Air Force bombers on several missions beginning in late 1943. The airfield was attacked twice throughout 1944: on 19 April 122 bombers dropped 840 500-lb general-purpose bombs and 1547 100-lb incendiary bombs. Later on 5 October 120 B-25 Mitchells from the 14th und 20th Combat Bombardment Wing, VIII Bomber Command - Eight Air Force, assisted by 107 P-51 Mustangs of the 355th and 361th, as well as 51 P-47 Thunderbolts of the 356th Fighter Group attacked the airfield and dropped 318 tons of general-purpose bombs and 176 tons of incendiary bombs. Several squadrons (56 bombers) of other wings with a target in Paderborn dropped by mistake their load also at the airfield. The Luftwaffe also moved several Anti Aircraft (FlaK) units into the area for defense. As Allied ground forces moved into Eastern France fighter bombers made attacks on the airfields of the Luftwaffe in general. These tactical aircraft used 500-pound General-Purpose bombs, unguided rockets and .50 caliber machine gun sweeps to keep the interceptors pinned down on the ground and deny the use of the airfields to the Luftwaffe as ground forces advanced into Germany.

Aircraft operations ended in early March 1945 when the use of the airfield by the Luftwaffe became unsustainable due to fuel shortages, lack of equipment, constant air raids and the general retreat of the German forces from the area.

=== List of Luftwaffen-units ===
(according to Zeng)

| from | to | unit |
|---|---|---|
| 1936-02 | 1936–03 | III./Jagdgeschwader 134 |
| 1937-03 | | III./Jagdgeschwader 134 |
| 1937-04 | 1938-10 | Stab, I./Kampfgeschwader 254 |
| 1938-11 | 1938-12 | III./Jagdgeschwader 142 |
| 1939-01 | 1939-04 | III./Zerstörergeschwader 142 |
| 1939-05 | 1939-08 | III./Zerstörergeschwader 26 |
| 1939-12 | | I.(Jagd)/Lehrgeschwader 2 |
| 1939-12 | 1940-01 | I./Zerstörergeschwader 26 |
| 1940-02 | 1940-03 | I./Sturzkampfgeschwader 77 |
| 1940-04 | 1940-06 | KGr.z.b.V. 11 |
| 1940-05 | | KGr.z.b.V. 101 |
| 1940-05 | 1941-03 | Stuka-Erg.St./VIII.Fliegerkorps* |
| 1940-08 | 1942-01 | Erg.St.(Schl.)/Lehrgeschwader 2* |
| 1941-05 | | 2.(H)/Aufkl.Gr. 32 |
| 1941-05 | 1941-06 | I./Schnellkampfgeschwader 210 |
| 1942-01 | 1942-03 | Erg.St./Schlachtgeschwader 1* |
| 1942-01 | 1942-04 | II./Schlachtgeschwader 1 |
| 1942-03 | 1942-04 | 5./Erg.JGr. Ost* |
| 1942-04 | 1942-05 | 4. and 8./Schlachtgeschwader 1 |
| 1944-08 | 1944-11 | 1./Nachtjagdgeschwader 11 |

* replacement units

=== USAAF use ===
Lead elements of the British XXI Army Group forces from the north and the American First and Ninth Armies from the south met on 1 April 1945 near Lippstadt, closing the Ruhr Pocket and surrounding of the German Army in western Germany. On 7 April the IX Engineer Command 830th Engineer Aviation Battalion moved in and cleared the airfield of mines and wrecked Luftwaffe aircraft. Within a day the airfield was usable for C-47 Skytrain transports for combat resupply and casualty evacuation (S&E) use, with the airfield being designated as Advanced Landing Ground "Y-98 Lippstadt".

By 20 April, enough repairs had been made to allow the field to be used by operational combat units, and the Ninth Air Force 373d Fighter Group moved in with P-47 Thunderbolt fighter-bombers and supported Allied ground forces rapidly moving east towards the Elbe River in northern and central Germany. Within two weeks combat ended with the German surrender on 7 May.

The airfield remained open until 12 July, serving as a transport field for C-47s, and also as a garrison for the Army of Occupation. Being in the British Zone of Occupation, it was turned over to British Army forces and the American units left.

=== Postwar ===
Lippstadt was not used as an active RAF base and eventually the destroyed airfield and its facilities were completely removed. The British Army constructed a new garrison (Camp El Alamein) spreading a mean part of the former airfield. From 1958 to 2007 the Bundeswehr used the garrison as Lipperland-Kaserne. The surroundings including the Luftwaffe garrison was used for creating new urban settlements in the late 1940s/early 1950s. Since 2013 an investor is rising a business area in the northern part and family homes in the south of the area of the former Bundeswehr garrison. So the urban area has absorbed the former airfield and only little evidence of existence remains. The Luftwaffe station can still be seen by some military style buildings laid out in a pattern indicating a garrison next to the former airfield as well in the business area you will find facilities of the former Bundeswehr use.

== See also ==
- Advanced Landing Ground
