= Storck Barracks =

US Army facility in Illesheim, Germany

Storck Barracks/Illesheim Kaserne Illesheim Airfield Advanced Landing Ground (ALG) R-10
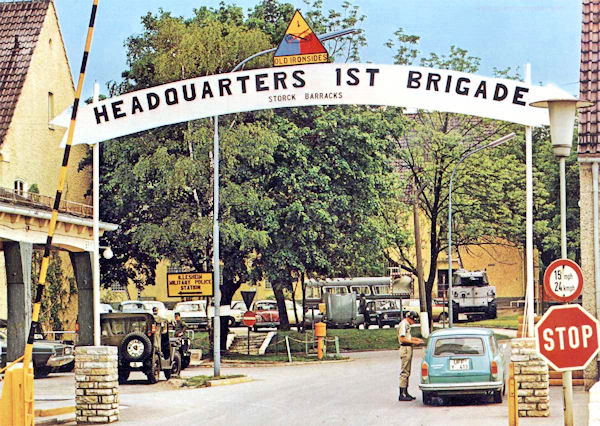
- Main gate at Storck Barracks, 1968

Site information
- Type: Military Garrison
- Controlled by: United States Army

Location
- Coordinates: 49°28′24″N 010°23′11″E

Site history
- Built: 1936
- Built by: Luftwaffe
- In use: 1936-1945 (Luftwaffe); April 1945-May 1947 (USAAF); May 1947-Current (United States Army)

Location of Storck Barracks, Germany

Storck Barracks/Illesheim Kaserne is a United States Army facility adjacent to Illesheim, Germany, located about 15 miles northwest of Ansbach (Bavaria), about 240 miles south-southwest of Berlin.

Storck Barracks is part of the United States Army Garrison (USAG) Ansbach. It is named after Colonel Louis J. Storck, who served as Executive Officer for the 4th Armored Division, Commander of Combat Command A and the 37th Armor Regiment, and S-3 and Commander of the 704th Tank Destroyer Battalion in World War II. Colonel Storck was awarded the Silver Star posthumously for his gallantry in action near Raids, France from July 17 to 25, 1944.

It is the home of the 2nd Battalion, 159th Aviation Regiment, and the 3rd Battalion, 159th Aviation Regiment, both equipped with the Boeing AH-64 Apache; D Co 412th Aviation Support Battalion (all units part of the 12th Combat Aviation Brigade) and the 3rd of the 58th Airfield Operations Battalion (AOB). It has a commissary (to be closed in March 2016), gas station, and shoppette. It also has an elementary school and family housing.

== History ==
Fliegerhorst Illesheim was built by the German Luftwaffe beginning in 1934, with construction completing in 1936. This construction was in conjunction with the Hohenfels Maneuver Training Area (MTA) and in violation of post World War I agreements.

In 1936, the airfield went into operation as a supply, maintenance and repair facility for the Luftwaffe. The Castle Berlichingen in Illesheim was used for the Headquarters. The same year the Bahnhof and the Post Office were built. Only one combat unit was assigned during the 1930s, Zerstörergeschwader 52 (ZG 52), during mid-1939 equipped with early-model Messerschmitt Bf 109Ds.

=== German use during World War II ===
With the breakout of World War II, two bomber units, Kampfgeschwader 76 (KG 76) and KG 51 were assigned briefly, KG 76 being transitioned at Illesheim from Dornier Do 17Z light bombers to Junkers Ju 88A mediums in 1940/41. KG 51 underwent transition training from the Ju 88 to the Messerschmitt Me 410 for 10 months during 1942 before being assigned to the Western Front.

In addition to the transition training, Illesheim served as a major supply Depot for German Wehrmacht forces in Sicily and Crete. Only about 20% of the material utilized by the Depot was kept on the airfield. For security reasons, the remainder was distributed throughout the surrounding villages.

In 1943, in response to the Allied air attacks on Germany, the base transitioned to a day/night interceptor airfield as part of the "Defense of the Reich" campaign by the Luftwaffe. For the next two years, a series of Bf 110, Me 410, Bf 109G, Fw 190A and Ju 88 units were assigned to Illesheim. Nachtjagdgeschwader 6 (NJG 6), a RADAR-equipped Bf 110 night interceptor unit, was credited with 200 confirmed Allied kills.

Between 1943 and 1944 Illesheim was only attacked twice, once along the railroad tracks and once on the airfield with two drone aircraft being destroyed as a result. In early April 1945, the last Luftwaffe unit, Zerstörergeschwader 101 (ZG 101), flying a mixture of Bf 110s and Ju 88s, left the airfield, taking with them everything that could be transported and burning the rest.

=== USAAF use ===
Illesheim Airfield was only lightly damaged during the war by Allied air attacks, and on 13 April 1945 elements of the United States Army 101st Cavalry Group moved into the village and airfield unopposed by the retreating Wehrmacht. The USAAF IX Engineering Command 819th and 831st Engineering Aviation Brigades moved in on 16 April 1945 to repair operational facilities and clear unexploded mines and other dangerous munitions from the field. On 17 April the airfield was declared operationally ready for transport use, being designated as Advanced Landing Ground "R-10 Illesheim".

C-47 Skytrain transports immediately began to use the airfield, flying in supplies for the advancing ground units, and evacuating casualties to rear areas. A week later, the Ninth Air Force 48th Fighter Group, equipped with P-47 Thunderbolts moved in, flying their last combat sorties of the war. On 3 May, the 48th was joined by the P-47-equipped 362d Fighter Group. By late April 1945, the German forces were in full retreat, and many units were beginning to surrender to the American forces. Illesheim Airfield was pressed into service as a Prisoner of War Camp to hold the German POWs, who were put to use repairing the buildings and cleaning up the area after the surrender.

Immediately after the war ended, the German POWs were organized into several labor battalions, and transported to damaged areas to assist in the initial reconstruction efforts. The USAAF organized the 1348th Labor Supervision Company and the 201st Labor Supervision Center, Aviation to spearhead these efforts. The P-47 combat groups moved out by the end of July 1945, being replaced by the Air Technical Service Command 42d Air Supply Squadron and 30th Air Depot (Illesheim Air Depot) which both served as supply and maintenance centers for USAAF needs, but also served as a center for destroying former Luftwaffe Aircraft and German Army ground vehicles and armor which were unsuitable for use in the reconstruction effort (47th Mobile Reclamation and Repair Squadron).

In May 1947, the Air Force units began moving out of Illesheim, the facility being turned over to Army units who used the airfield as a garrison post as part of the American Zone of Occupation, renaming the facility Storck Barracks.

=== United States Army use ===
Storck Barracks/Illesheim Kaserne has been a major Army garrison for over 70 years, being a key NATO post in the defense of Western Europe during the Cold War, and today, as part of the continuing U.S. Army Europe (USAREUR) mission in Europe.

Since 1947, there has been a succession of US units with a variety of missions stationed at Illesheim, the most prominent were the 1st Brigade, of the 4th Armor Division that included the 4/35th Armor and the first occupants of the new billets, the 2/51st infantry division which was later replaced around 1971 by the 1st Armored Division, that included the 1st battalion, 6th Infantry, "Regulars, by God!" and on 20 June 1974, 1st Battalion, 13th Armor rejoined the 1st Armored Division at Illesheim, Germany until 20 February 1987, when the Battalion moved to Vilseck, Germany. 13th Tank remained here until 1988, when it was inactivated and re-designated as 2nd Battalion, 13th Armor at Fort Knox, Kentucky. In the late 1950s and early 1960s, new construction was accomplished to include troop billets, a dining facility, and family housing apartments. In the mid 1980s, the 11th Aviation Group was reflagged as the 11th Aviation Brigade and relocated to Illesheim. Subordinate units of the 11th Avn Bde also located at Illesheim included the 4th Battalion of the 229th Advanced Attack Helicopter Regiment ("Flying Tigers"), 2nd Squadron, 6th Cavalry Regiment and the 6th Squadron, 6th Cavalry Regiment. All 3 units were equipped with OH-58C Kiowa, AH-64A Apache and UH-60A Blackhawk helicopters and both the 4-229th and 2-6th deployed with the 11th Avn Bde to Saudi Arabia in December 1990 to participate in Operation's DESERT SHIELD and then DESERT STORM. 6-6 Cav eventually deployed to Turkey along the Iraqi border. Major renovations occurred in 1973, and in 1985-1987 the Flight Simulator was constructed. Around the time the 11th Avn Bde deployed to Saudi Arabia, construction started on the large concrete ramp area and other improvements.

Since 2001, units from Storck Barracks have been deployed to the Middle East and other combat areas as part of the global war on terrorism. It is suspected that many personnel and much of the equipment assigned to Storck are in deployed status, as aerial photographs of the facility show an almost empty ramp, with just a few Apache helicopters present.

The Apaches have either returned to the United States, or moved to nearby Katterbach AAF during 2014/2015 (some 18 examples). Now Illesheim AAF is home to rotational Combat Aviation Brigade sized units from bases in the continental United States-some 50-65 helicopters at any one time. Helicopters from these units are forward deployed to locations in Eastern Europe to train with allied partners and deter Russian aggression.

The facility today bears little or no resemblance to the wartime Luftwaffe airfield from which it originated. Modern, state-of-the-art facilities are present, the only remaining evidence of its former use as a combat airfield is the disturbed areas at each end of its 2,000 ft. runway, overlaid over the former 4,500 ft. concrete runway.

== See also ==
- Advanced Landing Ground
