= Air National Guard =

Component of the US National Guard

- Emblem of the Air National Guard, which portrays two jet aircraft and The Minute Man sculpture
- Active: 1947–present
- Country: United States
- Allegiance: Federal (10 U.S.C. § E); State and territorial (32 U.S.C.)
- Branch: United States Air Force
- Type: Air Reserve Component (ARC); Reserve force Militia
- Role: Provide the Air Force with combat-ready reserve air forces (Title 10) as well as protecting and supporting their respective states (Title 32)
- Size: 103,605 airmen 1,080 aircraft
- Part of: National Guard; National Guard Bureau; Reserve components of the United States Armed Forces
- Headquarters: The Pentagon, Arlington County, Virginia
- Nicknames: "Air Guard", "The Guard"
- Mottos: Always Ready, Always There
- Colors: Ultramarine blue, Yellow
- March: Always Ready, Always There
- Anniversaries: 18 September
- Equipment: List of equipment of the United States Air Force
- Engagements: Cold War; Korean War; Vietnam War; Grenada War; Persian Gulf War; Kosovo War; War on Terror; Afghan War; Iraq War
- Website: ang.af.mil goang.com

Commanders
- Director: Maj Gen Randal K. Efferson (acting)
- Deputy Director: Maj Gen Bryony A. Terrell
- Command Chief Master Sergeant: CMSgt Joshua D. Moore

Insignia
- Flag of the Air National Guard

Aircraft flown
- Attack: A-10C, MQ-9
- Bomber: B-2
- Fighter: F-15C/D/EX, F-16, F-22A, F-35A
- Multirole helicopter: HH-60G, HH-60W
- Reconnaissance: MC-12, RC-26B
- Transport: C-17A, C-21, C-26, C-40B, C-130H, C-130J, LC-130
- Tanker: HC-130J, KC-135R, KC-46

The Air National Guard (ANG), also known as the Air Guard, is a federal military reserve force of the United States Air Force (USAF), as well as the "air militia" of each U.S. state, the District of Columbia, the Commonwealth of Puerto Rico, and the territories of Guam and the U.S. Virgin Islands. It, along with the Army National Guard component of each state, district, commonwealth or territory, makes up the National Guard of each region as applicable. The ANG and the United States Air Force Reserve constitute the two air reserve components of the USAF.

When Air National Guard units are used under the jurisdiction of the state governor they are fulfilling their militia role. When federalized by order of the president of the United States, ANG units become an active part of the U.S. Air Force. They are jointly administered by the states and the National Guard Bureau, a joint bureau of the Army and Air Force that oversees the U.S. National Guard.

== History ==
=== Origins ===
The modern day National Guard in the U.S. traces its origins to 13 December 1636, when the Massachusetts Bay Colony's General Court passed an act calling for the creation of three regiments, organizing existing separate militia companies in and around Boston. The creation of the militia regiments was caused by the perceived need to defend the Bay Colony against American Indians and from other European countries operating in North America. This organization formed the basis of subsequent colonial and, post-independence, state and territorial militias which later became the Army National Guard.

Being "local" ground forces affiliated with the Army, militias were considered state-centric/territorial-centric in nature, this versus naval forces, which were considered wholly activities of the federal government. This distinction accounts for why there are no National Guard components in the U.S. Navy, U.S. Marine Corps or U.S. Coast Guard. Because the present day U.S. Air Force evolved from the U.S. Army, it was only natural that a separate Air National Guard would be established with the divestiture of the former U.S. Army Air Forces and its establishment as a separate and independent U.S. Air Force in 1947.

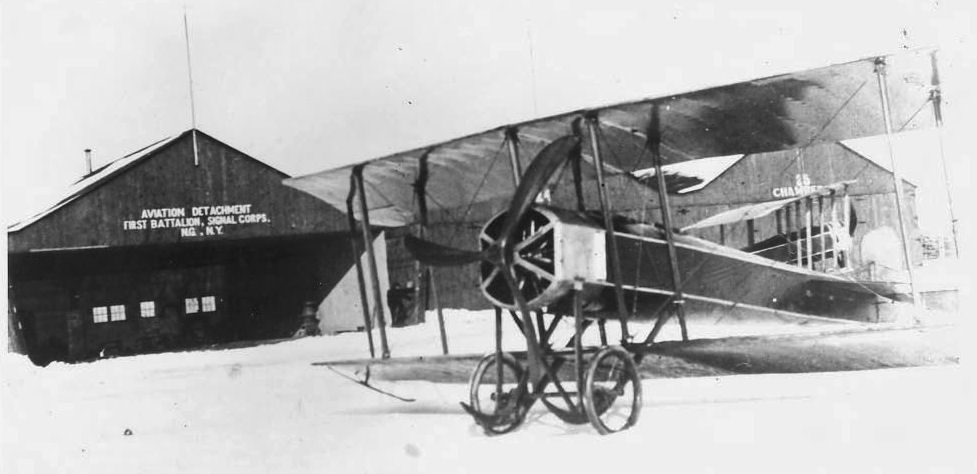
A Galludet Tractor biplane which the New York National Guard aviators rented in 1915

The Air National Guard was officially established in law as a separate reserve component on 18 September 1947, concurrent with the establishment of the U.S. Air Force. However, National Guard aviation emerged before World War I with aviation units in Army National Guard organizations.

In April 1908, a group of enthusiasts organized an "aeronautical corps" at the Park Avenue Armory in New York City to learn ballooning. They were members of the 1st Company, Signal Corps, New York National Guard. Although they received instruction and assembled a balloon, it was not clear whether members of the unit had ever actually ascended in it. In 1910 the unit raised $500 to finance its first aircraft.

During the Mexican Border Crisis of 1915 Captain Raynal Cawthorne Bolling organized and took command of a unit that became the 1st Aero Company, New York National Guard. It trained at Mineola Field, Mineola, Long Island. It is recognized as the ANG's oldest unit and its lineage is carried by the 102nd Rescue Squadron of the New York Air National Guard. On 13 July 1916, the 1st Aero Company mobilized during the border crisis with Mexico. the unit was called into federal service when the Mexican revolution spilled over the border into the United States. Bolling's unit was joined at Mineola by the 2nd Aero Company of Buffalo and 12 Guard officers from other states. Both air units remained at Mineola during the crisis.

When the U.S. entered World War I in April 1917, the War Department decided that it would not mobilize National Guard air units. Instead, individual Guard volunteers provided a major pool for the Army to draw aviators from. They were required to leave the Guard and enter the Signal Corps Reserve if they wished to fly in the war. About 100 National Guard pilots joined the newly formed U.S. Army Air Service. Guardsmen also played prominent roles in air operations in France.

On 14 April 1918, Tennessee guardsman Reed Chambers flew with Eddie Rickenbacker and David Peterson of the 94th Pursuit Squadron from Villeneuve, France on the first combat mission ever ordered by an American commander of a U.S. squadron of American pilots. At least four guardsmen—Chambers, Field Kindley (Kansas), Reed Landis (Illinois), and Martinus Stenseth (Minnesota) – became aces. 2nd Lieutenant Erwin R. Bleckley of Kansas was awarded the Medal of Honor posthumously for his heroism as an aerial observer. After the armistice and the return of the American Expeditionary Force in 1919, the wartime squadrons were demobilized and inactivated.

=== Interwar period ===
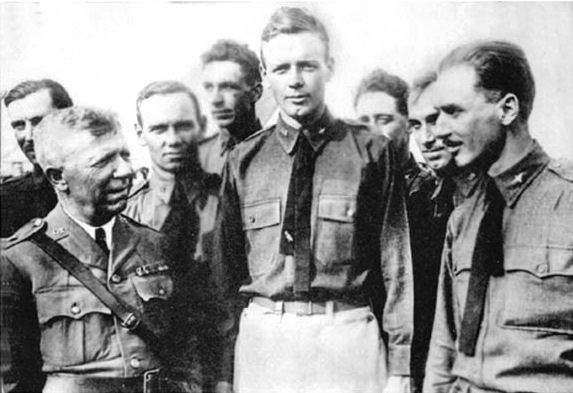
Captain Charles A. Lindbergh, Missouri National Guard, and members of his National Guard unit, 110th Observation Squadron, after he flew solo across the Atlantic Ocean, 1927

After the war, National Guard aviation was placed on a permanent basis over the initial opposition of the Army's General Staff. In 1920, the Militia Bureau and the Army Air Service agreed on a plan for re-organizing National Guard aviation units. On 17 January 1921, the 109th Observation Squadron of the Minnesota National Guard (1921–1941) became the first post World War I air unit to receive federal recognition. During the interwar period, 29 observation squadrons were established. They were either integral elements of National Guard infantry divisions or assigned to Army corps aviation.

An aviator in the 110th Observation Squadron of the Missouri National Guard (1923–1943) became the most famous National Guard pilot during the interwar period: Captain Charles A. Lindbergh. His service illustrated the close ties between military and commercial aviation. Trained to fly by the Army, he joined the 110th Observation Squadron in November 1925. The following year, he became chief pilot for an airmail venture started by fellow 110th pilots Major William Robertson and his brother Frank. After Lindbergh made his historic solo trans-Atlantic flight in May 1927, he recalled his service in the Guard fondly.

After the Fall of France, during 1940–1941, approximately 4,800 experienced National Guard aviation personnel were mobilized from their observation squadrons. They provided a significant augmentation of the Army's rapidly expanding air arm during a critical period. Most Guard air units were stripped of many key personnel, and the units were federalized into the regular Army Air Corps and were re-equipped with more modern aircraft. Some of the early-deploying squadrons maintained a degree of unit integrity and cohesion. But, most lost their character and identity as Guard organizations during World War II.

The units were transformed from observation organizations into reconnaissance, liaison, fighter, and bombardment squadrons. They served in every major combat theater during the war. The most significant wartime contribution of National Guard aviators was to train and lead the large numbers of volunteer airmen who had entered the AAF. That role was epitomized by Lt Col Addison E. Baker, a guardsman from Akron, Ohio. On 1 August 1943, Baker commanded the VIII Bomber Command's 93rd Bombardment Group on a daring but ill-fated low-level attack against enemy oil refineries at Ploiești, Romania. Baker was posthumously awarded the Medal of Honor for his heroic leadership.

=== Post-World War II Air National Guard ===
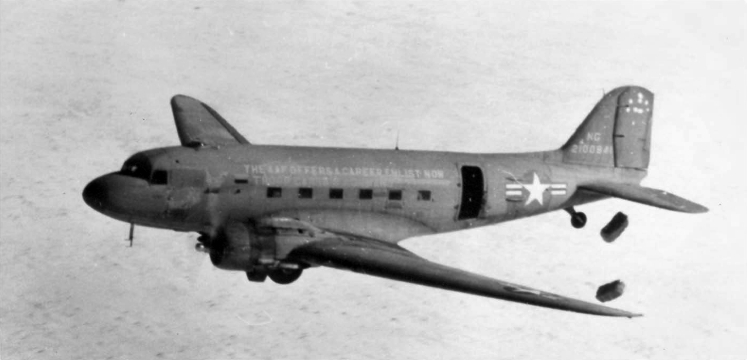
Following a devastating blizzard in 1949, Colorado ANG C-47s dropped hay to stranded and starving livestock throughout the Rocky Mountain region. Altogether the Colorado air guardsmen flew 17 such missions dropping tons of hay that saved thousands of cattle and wildlife. Colorado ANG F-51s and A-26s also flew 10 reconnaissance missions during that emergency, 29 January 1949.

The Air National Guard as it exists today, a separate reserve component of the United States Air Force in addition to the purely "federal" Air Force Reserve, was a product of the politics of postwar planning and inter-service rivalry during World War II. The Army Air Forces leaders who planned and maneuvered for an independent postwar Air Force during World War II had little confidence in the reserves of the U.S. Army, especially the state-dominated National Guard. On the contrary, those leaders expected to build the largest and most modern standing air force possible. However, domestic politics and American history forced them to significantly alter their plans.

Determined to include an Air Force National Guard in the postwar U.S. military establishment during World War II, the National Guard Association of the United States flexed its considerable political muscle. It compelled the U.S. Army Air Forces (USAAF) to plan for a significant Air Force National Guard once the overseas fighting ended. General of the Army George C. Marshall, the Army chief of staff, also pressured the USAAF to revise its ambitious plans for a large postwar active duty force.

When President Harry S. Truman instituted dramatic postwar military budget cuts, he split defense dollars evenly among the Army, Navy, and Air Force. That move also required the Air Force to plan for a far smaller active duty service than it had envisaged. As a result, the Air Force needed both reserve components, the Air National Guard and the Air Force Reserve, to help fill the gap.

As the wartime Army Air Forces demobilized in 1945 and 1946, inactivated unit designations were allotted and transferred to various State and Territorial Air National Guard bureaus to provide them unit designations to re-establish them as Air National Guard units. Initially, the National Guard Bureau (NGB) developed a table of organization for the Air National Guard to include at least one unit allocation per state. The territories of Alaska, Hawaii and Puerto Rico were allocated one unit designation each.

A table of organization was developed in which a series of twelve ANG Wings were allocated to provide command and control over separate regions of the United States. Each Wing controlled three or four Groups within the region. The Groups controlled squadrons within the region, sometimes distributed over several states.

On 21 August 1946, inactivated USAAF group and squadron designations were transferred from the Department of the Army to the National Guard Bureau. The units were re-designated with unit designations within the 101–299 range and allotments were made to Adjutant General of the states and territories whose mission it was to organize the units being allocated and prepare them for federal recognition by the NGB.

The combat element was organized into twelve wings which were then divided into 20 fighter groups totaling 62 squadrons, two light bombardment groups comprising four squadrons, and five composite groups with twelve fighter squadrons and six bombardment squadrons. Command and control organizations were:

- 52nd Fighter Wing, New York

Replaced by 106th Bombardment Wing, 1 November 1950
Replaced by 107th Fighter Wing, 1 November 1950

106th Bombardment Group, New York
107th Fighter Group, New York
108th Fighter Group, New Jersey

- 53rd Fighter Wing, Pennsylvania

Replaced by 111th Air Defense Wing, 1 November 1950
Replaced by 113th Fighter Wing, 1 November 1950

111th Bombardment Group, Pennsylvania
112th Fighter Group, Pennsylvania
113th Fighter Group, District of Columbia

- 54th Fighter Wing, Georgia

Replaced by 116th Fighter Wing, 1 November 1950

116th Fighter Group, Georgia
117th Fighter Group, Alabama
118th Fighter Group, Tennessee

- 55th Fighter Wing, Ohio

Replaced by 121st Fighter Wing, 1 November 1950

121st Fighter Group, Ohio
122nd Fighter Group, Indiana
123rd Fighter Group, Kentucky

- 60th Fighter Wing, Washington

Replaced by 142nd Fighter Wing, 1 November 1950

142nd Fighter Group, Oregon

- 61st Fighter Wing, California

Replaced by 144th Fighter Wing, 1 November 1950

144th Fighter Group, California

- 62nd Fighter Wing, California

Replaced by 146th Composite Wing, 1 November 1950

146th Fighter Group, California

- 63rd Fighter Wing, Texas

Replaced by 136th Fighter Wing, 1 November 1950

136th Fighter Group, Texas
137th Fighter Group, Oklahoma

- 66th Fighter Wing, Illinois

Replaced by 126th Composite Wing, 1 November 1950

126th Bombardment Group, Illinois
127th Fighter Group, Michigan
128th Fighter Group, Wisconsin

- 67th Fighter Wing, Massachusetts

Replaced by 102nd Fighter Wing, 1 November 1950

101st Fighter Group, Maine
102nd Fighter Group, Massachusetts
103rd Fighter Group, Connecticut

- 71st Fighter Wing, Missouri

Replaced by 131st Composite Wing, 1 November 1950

131st Fighter Group, Missouri
132nd Fighter Group, Iowa
133rd Fighter Group, Minnesota

- 86th Fighter Wing, Colorado

Replaced by 140th Fighter Wing, 1 November 1950

140th Fighter Group, Colorado

Individual state squadrons were assigned to either Groups or Wings, depending on circumstances, allocations, and gaining commands of the Army Air Forces. As individual units were organized, federally recognized, and activated, the Army Air Forces provided them airfields, equipment and surplus aircraft. Once formed, the units began obtaining federal recognition, and the state Air National Guard units were established. Its primary units were 84 flying squadrons, mostly equipped with P-51 Mustang and P-47 Thunderbolt fighters with air defense of the continental United States as their main mission, its units under the jurisdiction of the USAAF Air Defense Command. Tactical Air Command also had several ANG units being assigned B-26 Invader medium bombers.

18 September 1947, however, is considered the Air National Guard's official birth, concurrent with the establishment of the United States Air Force as a separate branch of the United States military under the National Security Act. The postwar Air National Guard force of the late 1940s included 58,000 members. Between 1946 and 1949, all of the initial allotment of units received federal recognition in the CONUS. The Hawaii Territory ANG received recognition and was activated on 4 November 1946; the Puerto Rico ANG on 23 November 1947, and the Alaska Territory ANG on 15 September 1952.

At the end of October 1950, the Air National Guard converted to the wing-base (Hobson Plan) organization. As a result, the former Army Air Forces Wings which were allocated were inactivated by the National Guard Bureau returned to the control of the Department of the Air Force on 31 October 1950. The personnel and equipment of the inactivated wings were transferred to new Air National Guard wings which were established, recognized and activated on 1 November 1950.

After World War II, the Air National Guard developed an unfortunate reputation as a glorified "flying club" for World War II combat veterans. Not only did the units and individuals lack specific wartime missions, their equipment, especially aircraft, was obsolete and their training was usually deplorable. Once mobilized, those air national guardsmen proved to be almost totally unprepared for combat. Regardless of their previous training and equipment, Air National Guard units were assigned almost at random to major air commands. It took months and months for ANG units to become combat ready; some units never succeeded.

=== Korean War ===
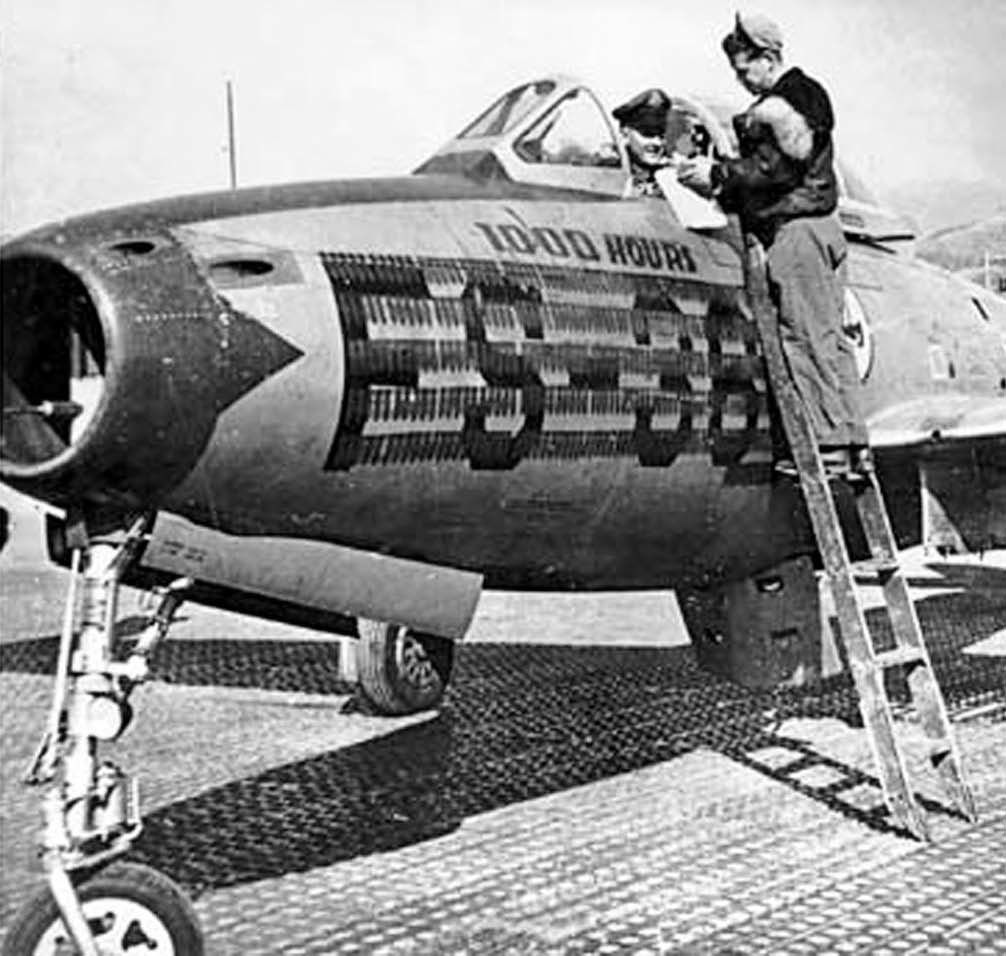
Captain John McMahn and Sergeant White, of the 182nd Fighter-Bomber Squadron, Texas Air National Guard, close out flight records at Taegu AB (K-2), South Korea, following their F-84E Thunderjet becoming the first such aircraft to complete 1,000 flying hours, 1952

During the Korean War, some 45,000 air guardsmen, 80 percent of the force, were mobilized. That callup exposed the weaknesses of the United States' various military reserve programs, including the ANG. Sixty-six of the Air Guard's ninety-two flying squadrons, along with numerous support units, were mobilized. Once in federal service, they proved to be unprepared for combat. Many key air guardsmen were used as fillers elsewhere in the Air Force. It took three to six months for some ANG units to become combat ready. Some never did.

Eventually, they made substantial contributions to the war effort and the Air Force's global buildup. In the Far East, the ANG's 136th and 116th Fighter-Bomber Wings compiled excellent combat records flying F-84 Thunderjets. Air guardsmen flew 39,530 combat sorties and destroyed 39 enemy aircraft. But, 101 of them were either killed or declared missing in action during the conflict. Four air guardsmen—captains Robert Love (California), Clifford D. Jolley (Utah), and Robinson Risner (Oklahoma), plus Major James Hagerstrom (Texas) – became aces, with some, such as Risner, later transferring to the Regular Air Force. Largely as a result of the Korean War experience, senior ANG and Air Force leaders became seriously committed to building the Air National Guard as an effective reserve component.

With the reinforcement of the Far East Air Forces (FEAF), Air National Guard squadrons were deployed to Europe in late 1950, being assigned to newly constructed bases in France as part of United States Air Forces in Europe (USAFE). These deployments helped reinforce the NATO commitment of the United States in case the combat in Korea became part of a wider conflict with the Soviet Union. Beginning in February 1951, mobilized units were assigned to Air Defense Command (ADC), Strategic Air Command (SAC) and Tactical Air Command (TAC), replacing or augmenting active duty units.

Air national guardsmen assigned to ADC also were assigned to aircraft control and warning as well as radar calibration units. Their organizations either strengthened American air defenses or were converted to tactical air control units that directed Air Force fighter aircraft in the continental United States, Alaska, Newfoundland, Europe, and French Morocco.

As a result of the federalization of the Air National Guard, ADC, SAC and TAC established additional wings for command and control of the federalized units. These were as follows:

- 101st Fighter-Interceptor Wing (ADC)

Federalized Maine ANG, 10 February 1951

- 103rd Fighter-Interceptor Wing (ADC)

Federalized Connecticut ANG, 2 March 1951

- 108th Strategic Fighter Wing (SAC)

Federalized New Jersey ANG, 1 March 1951

- 122nd Fighter-Interceptor Wing (ADC)

Federalized Indiana ANG, 10 February 1951

- 128th Fighter-Interceptor Wing (ADC)

Federalized Wisconsin ANG, 10 February 1951

- 133rd Fighter-Interceptor Wing (ADC)

Federalized Minnesota ANG, 2 March 1951

- 137th Fighter-Bomber Wing (TAC)

Federalized Oklahoma ANG, 26 October 1950

- 142nd Fighter-Interceptor Wing (ADC)

Federalized Oregon ANG, 2 March 1951

Air national guardsmen began to be demobilized in July 1952, with their units being inactivated by the active duty air force. Subsequently, the individual state Air National Guard bureaus reactivated and reformed the units beginning in January 1953. The USAF-established wings were also allocated to their states.

=== Runway alert program ===
Although Korean War hostilities ended in July 1953, the Cold War with the Soviet Union persisted. The initial mobilization fiasco forced the Air Force to achieve an accommodation with the Air National Guard and to thoroughly revamp its entire reserve system. Because of the problems associated with the Korean War mobilizations, the Air Force and its reserve components pioneered new approaches like the runway alert program to reserve training and management.

The Air Division chief at the National Guard Bureau wanted to find an innovative way to provide additional training for fighter pilots after their units were demobilized. At the same time, Air Defense Command could not call upon sufficient active duty Air Force units to defend the continental United States against the Soviet air threat. It was proposed to employ ANG pilots full-time from "strategically placed" Air National Guard units to perform "air intercept missions" against unidentified aircraft entering United States airspace. In addition they would "provide simulated fighter attacks against the Strategic Air Command's nuclear-capable bombers."

Using air national guardsmen from the 138th Fighter-Interceptor Squadron at Hancock Field, Syracuse, New York, and the 194th Fighter-Bomber Squadron at Hayward, California, the experiment began on 1 March 1953. It proved a great success and in August eight squadrons began "standing alert" using volunteer aircrews on a rotating basis for 14 hours a day. In October, nine more squadrons joined the program. The ANG runway alert program required some planes and pilots to be available around-the-clock to become airborne within minutes of being notified to scramble.

At its peak in the mid-1950s, all 70 Air National Guard fighter squadrons participated in that program. That number was reduced to 25 by 1961 due to budget constraints. Most of the runway alert exercises involved interceptions of SAC bombers. A few actual scrambles turned out to be interceptions of late or off-course commercial airliners. The runway alert experiment in 1953 marked the beginning of the Air National Guard's modern homeland defense role. It was the first broad effort to integrate reserve units into a major Air Force combat mission in peacetime on a continuing basis using volunteers.

=== Aircraft modernization ===
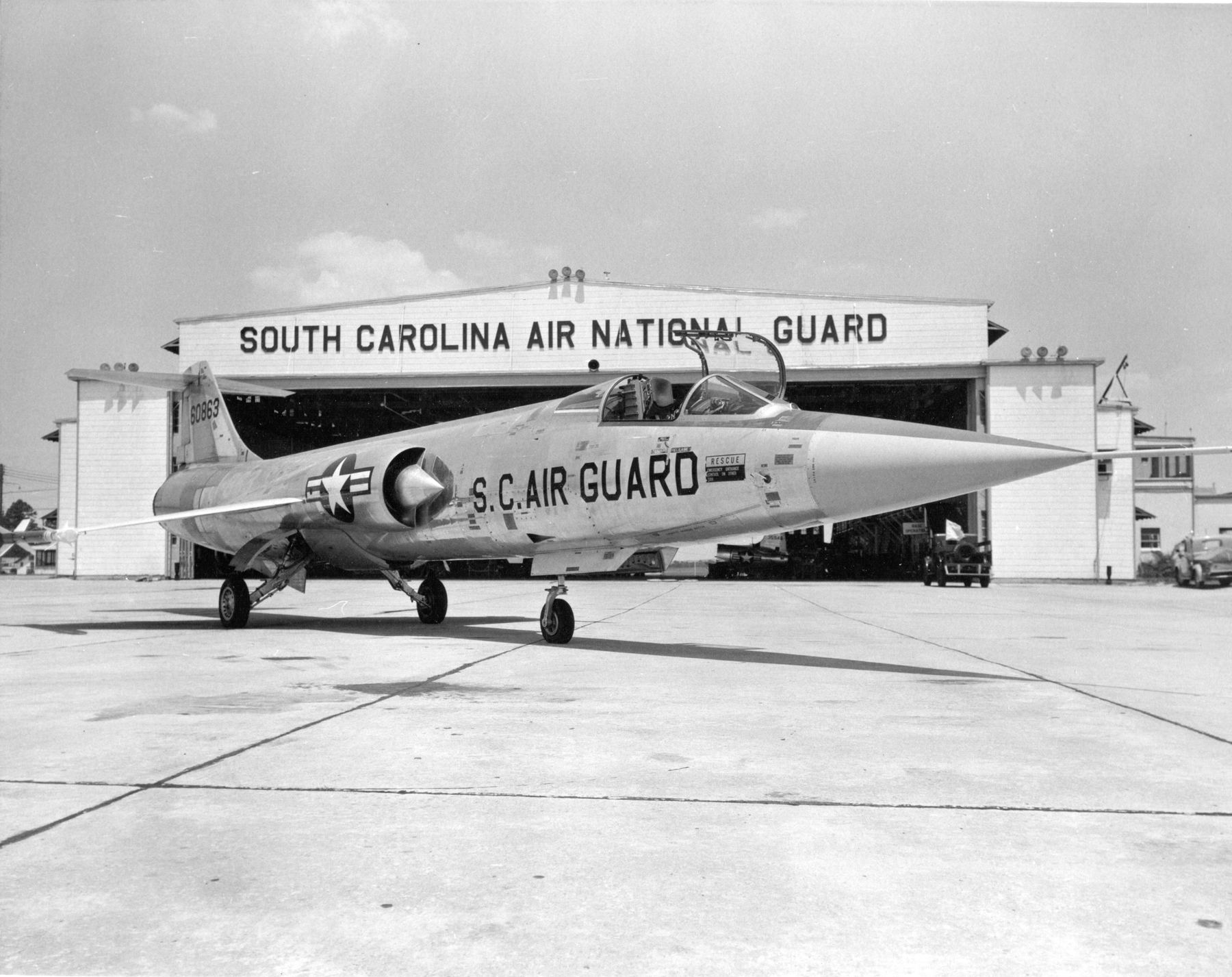
An Air National Guard Lockheed F-104A-25-LO Starfighter (AF Ser. No. 56-0863) from the 157th Fighter-Interceptor Squadron, South Carolina Air National Guard, at McEntire Air National Guard Base, South Carolina

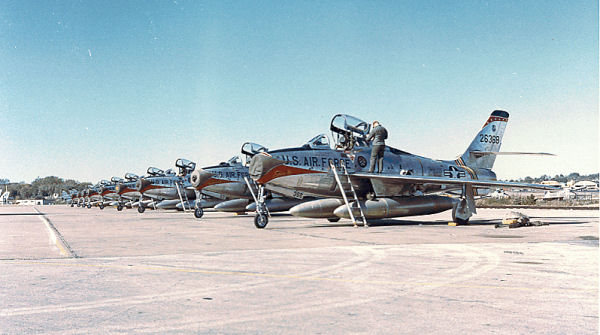
F-84F Thunderstreaks of the 110th Tactical Fighter Squadron, 131st Tactical Fighter Wing, Missouri Air National Guard, Toul Air Base, France – Deployed as a result of the Berlin Crisis 1961/62

Originally the Air National Guard was designed as a combat reserve force. After World War II, its flying units consisted of 72 fighter and 12 light bomber squadrons equipped with obsolescent World War II propeller-driven aircraft while the active duty Air Force transitioned to jet fighters. Although it had no airlift or tanker units, the Air National Guard's flying units were equipped with a small number of liaison, trainer, and transport planes, and the Air National Guard actively sought out new missions and aircraft.

With the end of World War II, the Air Force dropped "Air Commando" or special operations units from its rolls, although they were revived for the Korean War. After that conflict, in April 1955, the Air National Guard acquired its first special operations unit when the 129th Air Resupply Squadron was federally recognized and two C-46 Commandos were delivered to it at Hayward, California. It was allocated to the Air Resupply And Communications Service (ARCS), a predecessor organization of today's Air Force Special Operations Command

As its P-51 Mustangs and P-47 Thunderbolts became more and more obsolescent in the jet age of the 1950s, the force structure gradually changed to include a significant number of airlift, tanker, and specialized combat-support units. As the Air National Guard expanded, additional squadrons, including airlift units as well as Air Resupply and Communications units, were established. Additional command and control groups and wings were also established by the National Guard Bureau and allocated to the states. The ANG however, unlike the active duty USAF, did not inactivate its combat groups during the 1950s as part of the tri-deputate organization. Many of the combat groups remained assigned to the wings from which they were derived. It was not until 1974 that the ANG fully adapted the USAF tri-deputate organization and inactivated its combat groups, assigning its operational squadrons directly to the wings.

The Air National Guard aggressively worked to preserve its existing flying units by obtaining the most modern aircraft available. Some existing Air National Guard fighter units equipped with piston-driven fighters, however, could not convert to jets because the runways at the local airports where they were based were too short. In addition, some local leaders simply did not want jet fighters operating in their communities.

The ANG considered replacing the fighter squadrons in these instances with transport aircraft a viable option for overcoming runway issues or community objections and also was a way to keep experienced senior aviators in the cockpit. During the late 1950s, the Air Force allowed several Air National Guard units to trade in their aging piston-driven fighters for second-line transports. New Jersey's newly organized 150th Air Transport Squadron (Light) became the first pure airlift unit in the Air National Guard on 1 February 1956. It received Curtiss C-46D Commandos. Two other aeromedical transport squadrons followed that year, primarily because of the impracticality of converting their locations to modern jet fighter operations. In 1959, the Air Force, in order to save operating funds, planned to phase out 48 C-97 Stratofreighters before their replacements were available to the active force. The Air National Guard requested these aircraft be sent to ANG units, and in January 1960, units in California, Minnesota, New Hampshire, New York, and Oklahoma began trading in their obsolete fighters for C-97s.

Additionally, the Air National Guard also took on an air refueling mission. The Air National Guard received its first KC-97 Stratofreighter aerial tankers in July and August 1961. During that period, the 108th Fighter-Interceptor Squadron in Illinois, the 126th Fighter-Interceptor Squadron in Wisconsin, and the 145th Air Transport Squadron in Ohio, converted to KC-97Fs and were redesignated air refueling squadrons.

=== Cold War ===
World War II had left the city of Berlin 100 miles deep within East German territory, controlled by the Soviet Union, and divided into Soviet, British, French, and United States zones of occupation, administered under local agreements which did not guarantee Western access to the city. Responding to a series of Soviet actions in 1948, the three western allies consolidated their zones and formed the city of West Berlin. For fifteen years the western powers maintained a tenacious hold on West Berlin under periodic harassment of the Soviets. On 13 August 1961, Berliners woke up to find they lived in a divided city. A wall now separated East Berlin from West Berlin. With that provocative act, the Soviet Union ratcheted up the Cold War.

President John F. Kennedy mobilized a limited number of Reserve and Guard units, dispatching 11 ANG fighter squadrons to Europe. All the Guard units were in place within a month of their respective mobilization days, although they required additional training, equipment, and personnel after being called up. In all, some 21,000 air guardsmen were mobilized during the 1961 Berlin Crisis.

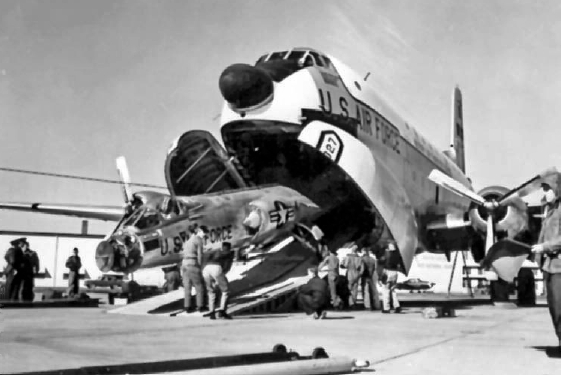
An F-104A Starfighter interceptor from the 157th Fighter-Interceptor Squadron, South Carolina Air National Guard, being loaded aboard a C-124 Globemaster II for shipment to Europe during the Berlin crisis, 1961

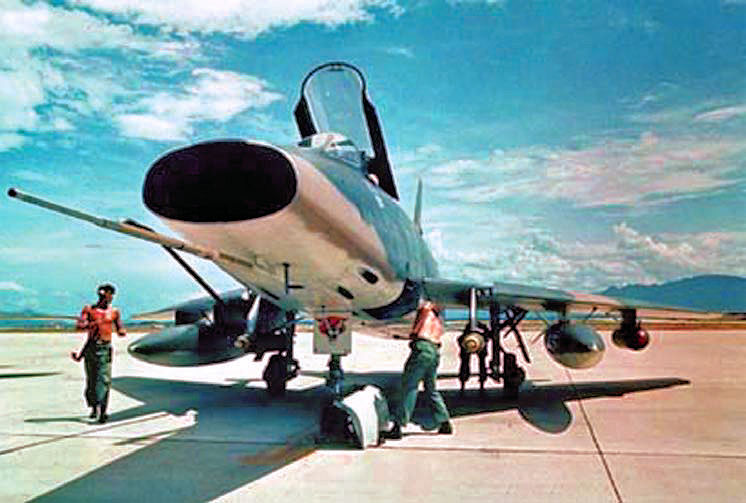
A ground crew preparing an F-100 of the Colorado Air National Guard's 120th Tactical Fighter Squadron for combat missions at Phan Rang Air Base, South Vietnam, 1968

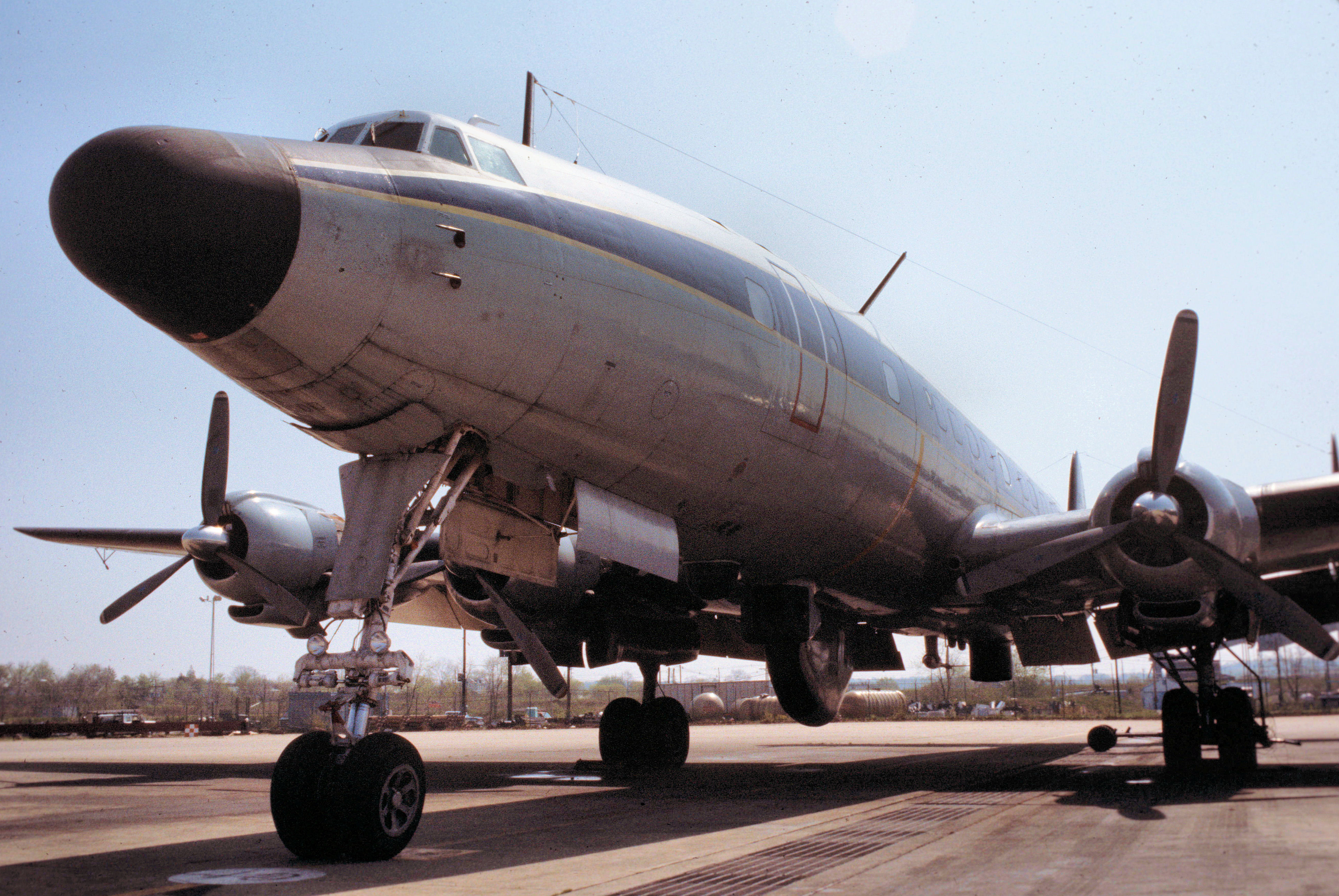
A Lockheed EC-121S Coronet Solo from the 193rd Tactical Electric Warfare Group, Pennsylvania Air National Guard

By August 1962, the units mobilized for the Berlin Crisis returned to state control. They had hardly resumed normal operations when President Kennedy announced on 22 October 1962 that the Soviet Union had placed nuclear warheads in Cuba, only 90 miles from Florida. With the Cuban Missile Crisis, Air National Guard fighter units trained for "no notice" deployments, and volunteer ANG airlift crews and their aircraft augmented Air Force global airlift operations. Air National Guard bases hosted Air Force fighters and bombers dispersed there to avoid a possible Soviet nuclear response to the crisis. But in the end, no ANG unit was federalized.

As a result of these two Cold War incidents, from January through December 1963, for the first time Air National Guard airlift units began routinely deploying overseas during their annual training periods, primarily to Europe, to exercise their wartime missions. Air National Guard transport units hauled cargo for the Military Air Transport Service (MATS) while training for their wartime global airlift role.

With the Regular Air Force tanker fleet being used more and more in Southeast Asia after 1965 to support combat operations in South Vietnam, combined with the concurrent demands of the Strategic Air Command (SAC) for performing its nuclear deterrence mission, both volunteer Air Force reservists and air national guardsmen in air refueling units participated in worldwide air refueling missions during their Annual Training or other additional active duty periods in order to supplement the active duty tanker force. The Texas Air National Guard's 136th Air Refueling Wing inaugurated Operation Creek Party on 1 May 1967, because the Regular Air Force did not have enough KC-135 Stratotanker aircraft available in Europe to train its fighter pilots in USAFE. The operation eventually involved nine ANG air refueling groups that rotated approximately every two weeks to Rhein-Main Air Base in West Germany.

The Vietnam War provided the next significant test for the Air National Guard. However, for largely domestic political reasons, President Lyndon B. Johnson chose not to mobilize most of the nation's reserve forces before 1968. His reasons for not mobilizing reserve forces were many. Primarily, he did not believe that the war in Vietnam justified the dramatic act of mobilizing Reserve and National Guard forces. He accepted the need to fight the war, but he wanted to prosecute it as quietly as possible, not attracting too much attention at home and risk jeopardizing his domestic programs. He also wanted to avoid drawing the Communist Chinese into the war or the attention of the Soviet Union, the latter which might view the mobilization of Reserve and National Guard units as "escalatory" within a larger Cold War context. Moreover, recalling reservists' complaints of inactivity following the Berlin mobilization of 1961, he was also reluctant to recall reservists and national guardsmen without the assurance that their employment would significantly affect the course of the war, an assurance no official in his administration could provide. As a result, even though still populated by many World War II and Korean War combat veterans, the Reserves and the National Guard acquired ill-deserved reputations during this period as havens for relatively affluent, young white men with no prior active duty military service to serve as officers or enlisted personnel as a means to avoid the draft into the active duty U.S. Army in an enlisted status.

Air National Guard airlift units, however, began flying regularly to Japan and South Vietnam beginning in 1966 to support Military Airlift Command (MAC) operations. These flights continued on a regular basis until 1972. In addition, between August 1965 and September 1969, Air National Guard domestic and offshore aeromedical evacuation flights freed active duty Air Force resources for such missions in Southeast Asia (SEA).

Moreover, after the 1968 Tet Offensive in which the Communist North Vietnamese and Vietcong troops attacked positions throughout the Republic of Vietnam, the Pentagon dispatched four Air National Guard fighter squadrons to that nation. In addition, the Pueblo Crisis in Korea also saw mobilized air force reservists, air national guardsmen and naval reservists in flying units. That crisis prompted the third partial Air National Guard mobilization since the end of World War II, and eventually two ANG fighter squadrons were dispatched to South Korea. However, the Pueblo crisis ended without a resort to combat.

In July 1970, two EC-121 "Super Constellations" from the Pennsylvania ANG's 193rd Tactical Electronic Warfare Squadron departed their home station for Korat RTAFB, Thailand. During the next six months, approximately 60 Air National Guardsmen were rotated through the latter installation on 30- to 60-day tours in Operation "Commando Buzz," their aircraft serving as flying radar stations and airborne control platforms for U.S. air operations in Southeast Asia (SEA) until January 1971.

The 355th Tactical Fighter Squadron (355th TFS) in 1967 was a Regular Air Force squadron assigned to the 354th Tactical Fighter Wing at Myrtle Beach AFB, South Carolina. From January 1968 until June 1969, the 355th TFS changed from a Regular Air Force unit composed almost entirely of recent SEA returnees to a composite squadron consisting of approximately 50% of whose personnel assets were composed of activated ANG members from the 119th TFS of the New Jersey ANG) and the 121st TFS of the District of Columbia ANG). The 355th deployed on temporary duty (TDY) to Phù Cát Air Base on 14 May 1968 with 13 of its 30 pilots being ANG members. The transfer became permanent on 26 June 1968, at which time all TDY members were offered the opportunity to volunteer for a full year's tour. All 13 ANG pilots volunteered, one of whom was killed in action a month later. By Christmas 1968, 87% of the squadron's support personnel were ANG members. Five of the ANG pilots also volunteered as Misty Forward Air Controllers (FACs) flying the F-100 Super Sabre. In all, ANG pilots were awarded 23 Silver Stars, 47 Distinguished Flying Crosses, and 46 Bronze Stars with Combat V for valor while stationed at Phu Cat.

=== Total Force Concept ===
As part of the re-thinking of military concepts after the Vietnam War, beginning in the early 1970s with the establishment of the All-Volunteer Armed Forces, both the Air National Guard and Air Force Reserve force planning and policymaking were influenced by the "Total Force" Concept and have remained so to this day. The concept sought to strengthen and rebuild public confidence in the reserve forces while saving money by reducing the size of the active duty force. In practical terms, the Total Force policy sought to ensure that all policymaking, planning, programming, and budgetary activities within the Defense Department considered active and reserve forces concurrently and determined the most efficient mix of those forces in terms of costs versus contributions to national security. The policy also insured that reservists and guardsmen, not draftees, would be the first and primary source of manpower to augment the active duty forces in any future crisis.

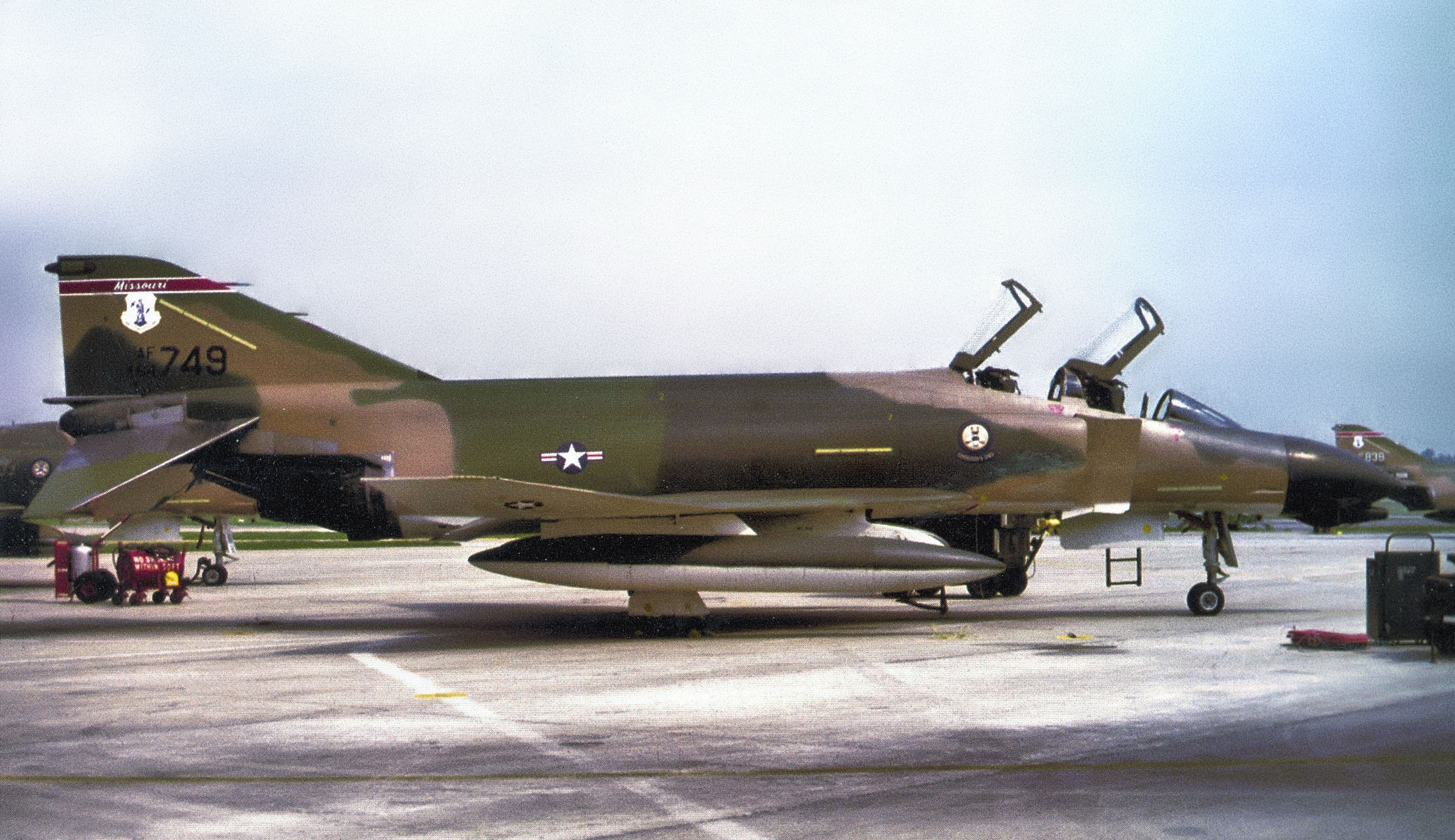
110th Tactical Fighter Squadron McDonnell F-4C-23-MC Phantom II, AF Ser. No. 64-0749, of the Missouri ANG at Lambert Field ANGB, St Louis, MO, 1980

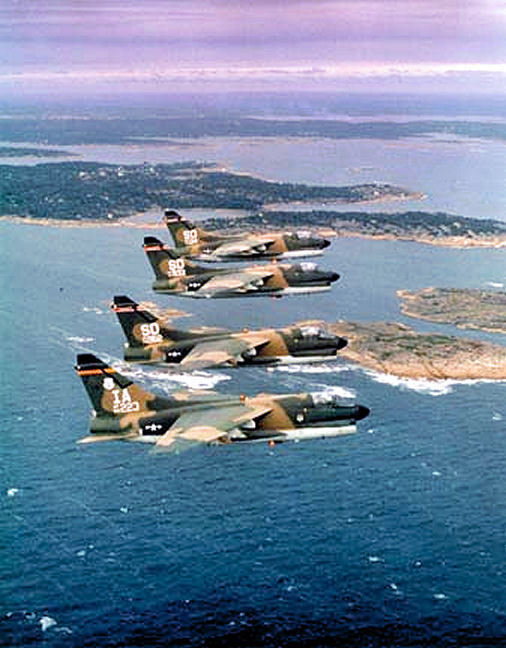
A-7 Corsair II aircraft of the Iowa ANG and South Dakota ANG flying near RAF Waddington, UK. These aircraft were deployed to the United Kingdom from 21 August to 12 September 1979 for NATO Exercise CORONET STALLION.

With the active forces being reduced after the end of the Vietnam War, a significant number of older C-130A Hercules tactical airlifters became available for the Air National Guard and Air Force Reserve, which allowed the Korean War-era C-119 Flying Boxcars and C-124 Globemasters to be retired. However, the Total Force Concept led to pressure to upgrade the reserve forces to front-line aircraft and beginning in 1974, new Ling-Temco-Vought (LTV) A-7D Corsair II ground attack aircraft began to be sent to Air National Guard units directly from the LTV manufacturing plant in Dallas. As A-10 Thunderbolt IIs began to replace the A-7Ds in the Regular Air Force in the mid and late 1970s, additional A-7D aircraft were transferred to the ANG. F-4 Phantom IIs began to be received by the ANG in the late 1970s with the F-15A Eagle and F-16A Fighting Falcons coming into the active inventory and ANG's F-100 Super Sabres being retired.

Starting in 1975, the ANG began conducting operations in Latin America and by the late 1970s to defend the Panama Canal and to provide training support, embassy resupply, search and rescue, and counterdrug operations. In addition, the ANG airlifted supplies and hardware to remote radar sites and performed aerial mapping operations.

In June 1979, the 137th Tactical Airlift Wing of the Oklahoma Air National Guard marked the first time an ANG airlift unit was equipped with brand new transport aircraft: it received four factory-fresh C-130H Hercules aircraft. Several years later, Congress institutionalized the practice of purchasing limited amounts of new weapons and equipment for the reserve components via National Guard and Reserve Equipment (NG&RE) funding allocations. Under the auspices of this separate appropriation for Guard and Reserve equipment established in 1982 under President Ronald Reagan, 69 brand new C-130s entered the ANG's inventory from 1984 to 1991.

In July 1972, Air National Guard units began supporting Air Force tanker task forces overseas with second-line KC-97 Stratofreighter propeller-driven tankers and volunteer crews when needed. Triggered by a 1974 decision by Secretary of Defense James R. Schlesinger to save money, the Ohio Air National Guard's 145th Air Refueling Squadron acquired the ANG's first jet tanker in April 1975 when it began converting from KC-97Ls to KC-135A Stratotankers. Altogether, the Air Force transferred 128 older KC-135s to the air reserve components to retire the slow prop-driven tankers, which modern fighters had to reduce speed to nearly stall speed in order to refuel from.

During the 1980s, changes in the Air National Guard's force structure and readiness were primarily driven by President Reagan's military buildup and the need to prepare for a possible war between the North Atlantic Treaty Organization (NATO) and the Warsaw Pact in Central Europe. The ANG focused on modernization, more realistic combat training, increased readiness, and personnel growth, primarily in nonflying, mission support units. In 1979, Tactical Air Command assumed the atmospheric air defense mission of the United States with the inactivation of Aerospace Defense Command (ADCOM or ADC). ADC fighter interceptor units were initially realigned into a component called Air Defense, Tactical Air Command (ADTAC), at the level of an Air Division. In 1985, First Air Force (1 AF) was reactivated by TAC and given the mission to provide, train and equip ADTAC combat ready forces. Upon its reactivation, First Air Force was composed of units of both the active Air Force and the Air National Guard. In the years since its third activation, more of the responsibility for the defense of American air sovereignty was shifted to the Air National Guard. By the 1990s, 90 percent of the air defense mission was being handled by the Air National Guard. In October 1997, First Air Force became an Air National Guard numbered air force, charged with the air defense of the North American continent.

Instead of increasing the number of units, the National Guard Bureau authorized units to increase the number of aircraft assigned to them when the Air Force made those planes available. In 1982, the South Carolina Air National Guard's 169th Tactical Fighter Group began receiving new General Dynamics F-16A Fighting Falcons. In Air Force-wide competitions, ANG units and individuals frequently placed high or won. This was due in no small part to the ANG units being manned by more senior pilots and weapon systems officers, most of whom had recent combat experience as prior active duty officers in the Regular Air Force and who continued to hone their skills in fighter aircraft while their active duty contemporaries had to leave the cockpit for career enhancing non-flying staff assignments. The 169th Tactical Fighter Group garnered top team honors in the Air Force's worldwide gunnery contest, Gunsmoke '89. During the late 1980s, the Air National Guard's F-106 Delta Darts, F-4 Phantom IIs and A-7D Corsair IIs were being replaced by F-15A and F-15B Eagles and F-16A and F-16B Fighting Falcons as more advanced models such as the F-15C/D and F-16C/D were brought into active service with the Regular Air Force.

=== Post Cold War era ===
The expiration of the Soviet Union, beginning with the fall of the Berlin Wall and Glasnost in 1989 and culminating in the USSR's breakup into its republics in 1991, constituted a major upheaval that continued to influence global politics into the 21st century.

==== Panama ====
In December 1989 and January 1990, ANG volunteers participated in Operation Just Cause, the invasion of Panama, to secure the arrest of Panamanian dictator and accused drug lord, General Manuel Noriega. Air National Guard aircrews already deployed TDY to Howard AFB, Panama also participated in Just Cause. Volunteer C-130 crews completed 181 sorties moving 3,107 passengers and 551.3 tons of cargo. In addition, Air National Guard A-7 Corsair II attack jets from the South Dakota Air National Guard's 114th Tactical Fighter Group and the Ohio Air National Guard's 180th Tactical Fighter Group flew 34 combat missions in support of the invasion. However, the Air National Guard and the Total Force concept would be fully tested in the two major operations of the 1990s: Operation Desert Shield and the first Gulf War, Operation Desert Storm.

In August 1990, ANG F-15 and F-16 fighter units initiated similar rotational service for Operation Coronet Nighthawk, the successor to Operation Volant Oak, out of Howard Air Force Base, Panama. Those units monitored suspected airborne drug traffickers transiting Central America as well as the adjacent oceans. As the 1999 transfer of the Panama Canal to Panama approached, the Air National Guard began turning the operation over to civilian contractors. The last air national guardsmen completed their deployments to these South American sites in 1999.

==== Persian Gulf crisis ====
Following the seizure of Kuwait by Iraqi forces in August 1990, the Air Force turned to both of its reserve components for help and was swamped with volunteers. Before President George H. W. Bush mobilized reservists and national guardsmen on 22 August 1990, nearly 1,300 air national guardsmen actually entered active duty as volunteers. Initially, most of them concentrated on aerial refueling and airlifting American forces to the Persian Gulf region. The first two ANG units to volunteer before the president's mobilization order were the 105th Military Airlift Group of the New York Air National Guard, and the 172nd Military Airlift Group of the Mississippi Air National Guard. Respectively, they flew the C-5A Galaxy and the C-141B Starlifter.

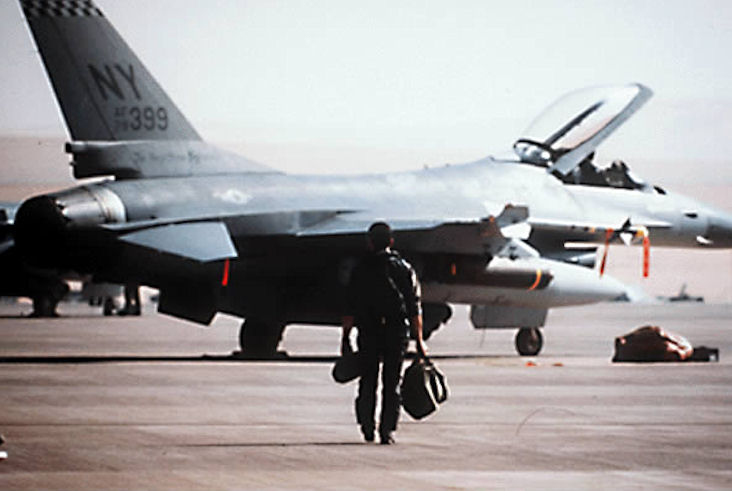
A New York Air National Guard F-16 pilot from the 174th Tactical Fighter Wing, 138th Tactical Fighter Squadron, preparing to take-off on a combat mission from a Saudi Arabian base during Operation Desert Storm, 1991

Altogether, 12,456 air national guardsmen participated in Air Force operations during the Persian Gulf crisis/first Gulf War. When called upon, air national guardsmen were immediately prepared to perform their missions alongside their active Air Force counterparts. They did not need additional training or new equipment to do their jobs. They were integrated into most of the Air Force's operational missions, flying strategic airlift and aerial refueling sorties, and manning aerial ports. Air national guardsmen also flew fighter, attack, aerial reconnaissance, special operations, and tactical theater airlift missions.

Compared to previous mobilizations, ANG units and individuals during Operations Desert Shield and Desert Storm were much better prepared to perform their missions upon entry into federal service. Units were well equipped and well trained. As planned, they were able to respond much more rapidly and effectively than in previous call-ups. They were integrated into operations with their active duty and Air Force Reserve counterparts with a minimum of disruption and delay.

In a new concept at the time, relatively few ANG outfits were mobilized as units. Instead, the Air Force called up packages of equipment and personnel that were developed after the crisis began. Mobilizing entire flying units and maintaining their integrity while in federal service, although desirable, would no longer be the only acceptable approach to supporting the Air Force in a crisis. Instead the Air National Guard would be flexible in its response in order to fit the situation. That could involve individual volunteers, tailored packages of volunteers, or mobilized air national guardsmen developed in response to specific contingencies.

After the first Gulf War ended in 1991, air power continued to play a significant role in containing Saddam Hussein's regime in Iraq, as did a naval blockade and United Nations economic sanctions. Together those forces also crippled the economic and military foundations of Hussein's power. The Air National Guard participated widely in that long campaign, which featured U.S. and Coalition aircraft maintaining two no-fly zones over portions of Iraq: Operation Southern Watch (OSW) and Operation Northern Watch (ONW). In addition, ANG units provided humanitarian aid to the Kurdish population in northern Iraq. Later deploying units to Turkey participated in Operation Northern Watch that was focused strictly on enforcing the no-fly zone above the 36th parallel in Iraq as mandated by the UN and did not include humanitarian relief for the Kurds.

==== Front-line aircraft ====
Following the first Gulf War, the Air National Guard's senior leadership in the National Guard Bureau began to adapt their organization for the post-Cold War era in a series of far-reaching discussions with top echelon Air Force personnel, state officials, unit leaders, and members of Congress. Essentially, the Air Force agreed it would attempt to retain all ANG and Air Force Reserve flying units, while reducing its own as a cost-effective way to maintain a post-Cold War force structure. However, as limited amounts of newer equipment became available from a smaller Air Force, and budgets tightened, the ANG would reduce the numbers of aircraft assigned to each unit. If necessary, it would combine units at the same locations. Some organizations would close down, but only as a last resort.

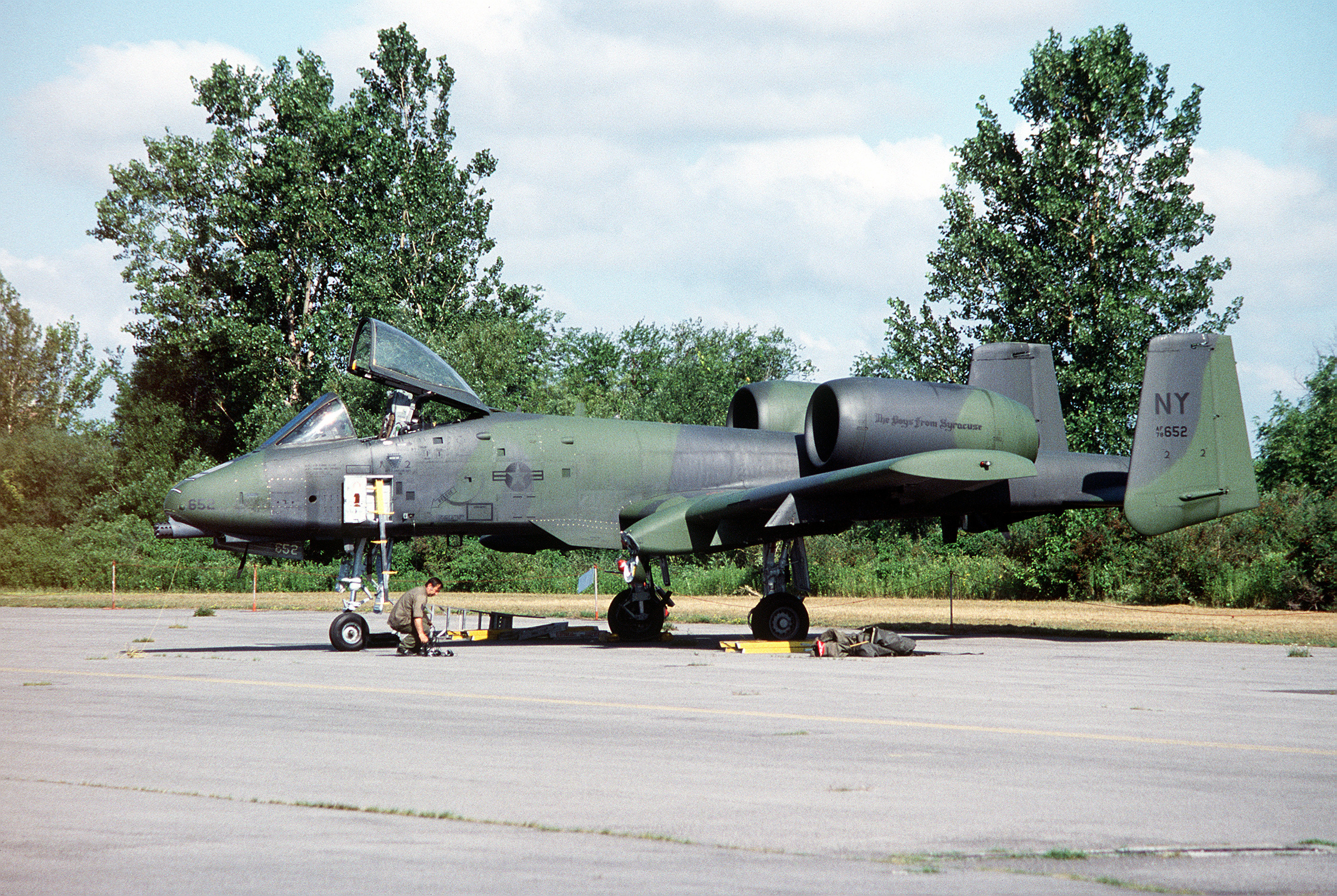
A Fairchild Republic A-10A Thunderbolt II (AF Ser. No. 78-0652) from the 138th Tactical Fighter Squadron, 174th Tactical Fighter Wing, New York Air National Guard

Aided by the newer aircraft from the shrinking Air Force inventory, the Air National Guard modernized and reshaped its fleet after the Cold War. The size and composition of the ANG's aircraft inventory changed significantly after 1991. From 1991 to 2001 the ANG experienced an enormous growth in large aircraft including C-130H Hercules tactical airlifters, upgraded KC-135E and KC-135R Stratotankers, and Rockwell B-1B Lancer strategic bombers at the expense of smaller fighter planes. One of the most critical modernization challenges facing the ANG involved its extensive fleet of older model F-16As and F-16Bs. As its goal, the ANG sought to acquire F-16C Block 25/30/32 aircraft, enabling ANG fighter units to have around-the-clock, all-weather, precision strike capabilities against surface targets. The first F-16As and F-16Bs to be retired from service entered storage with AMARC at Davis-Monthan AFB during 1993, with three aircraft from the 138th Fighter Squadron of the New York Air National Guard, followed by 17 examples from the 160th Fighter Squadron of the Alabama Air National Guard, which were updated with F-16Cs and F-16Ds from the shrinking active duty force.

In the general military drawdown following the end of the Cold War, many European-based F-15C Eagles previously assigned to USAFE were also transferred stateside. The 101st Fighter Squadron of the Massachusetts Air National Guard received new F-15Cs that were previously with the 32nd Fighter Group, Soesterberg AB, Netherlands in 1994. Other F-15A / F-15B units were upgraded to the F-15C and F-15D as they became available during the mid-1990s.

In the early 1990s, with the disestablishment of Strategic Air Command (SAC), Tactical Air Command (TAC) and Military Airlift Command (MAC) and their replacement with Air Combat Command (ACC) and Air Mobility Command (AMC), all Air National Guard units transitioned to the objective wing organization. Most flying unit designations were simplified to "Airlift" or "Fighter" or "Air Refueling" or "Rescue", with flying squadrons being assigned to Operations Groups. Also, on 1 October 1994, in accordance with the USAF "one base-one wing" policy, all Air National Guard flying units previously designated as a "group" had their status changed to a "wing" no later than 1 October 1995. Additionally, ANG stations hosting flying units were re-designated as an "Air National Guard Base" if they were not collocated on an active duty installation.

==== Balkans operations ====
Other overseas operations during the 1990s took air national guardsmen to Somalia, the former Yugoslavia, Haiti, and Rwanda to augment the Air Force in a series of contingencies and humanitarian relief operations. Air National Guard and Air Force Reserve units would generally assume responsibility for an operation for 30 to 90 days, and then rotate their personnel on 15- to 30-day tours to a given location until the commitment ended.

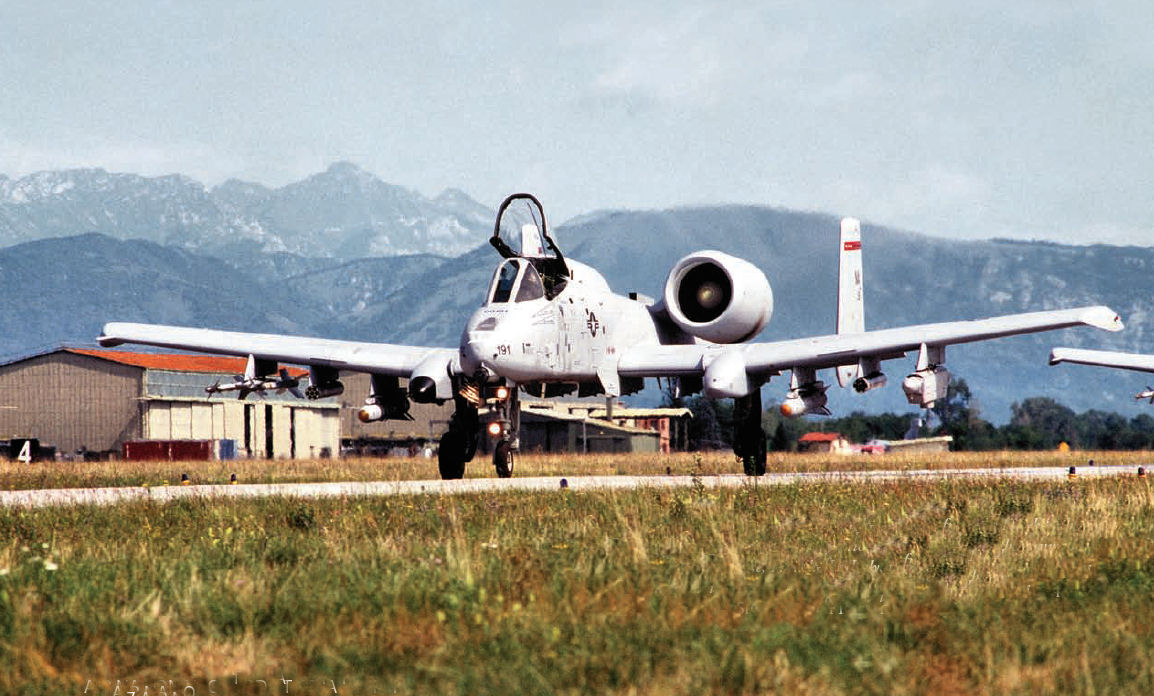
An Air National Guard A-10 Thunderbolt II aircraft from the 104th Fighter Group, Massachusetts Air National Guard, taxis on the runway at Aviano Air Base, Italy to take off for NATO airstrikes against the Bosnian Serbs, 6 September 1995

In July 1992, crews and C-130s from West Virginia's 167th Airlift Group inaugurated ANG involvement in Operation Provide Promise by flying food and relief supplies from Rhein-Main AB, Germany to Sarajevo, Bosnia's capital, which had a population of 380,000. That operation expanded significantly the following February to include airdrops of food and medicine to Muslim enclaves in eastern Bosnia blockaded by Bosnian Serbs. Altogether, personnel and C-130s from 12 ANG units participated in Provide Promise. During the operation, Air Force, ANG, and Air Force Reserve transports flew 4,533 sorties and delivered 62,802 metric tons of cargo. They performed airlift, airdrop, and medical evacuation missions. The Americans made a major contribution to the overall allied effort, which involved airmen from 21 nations. The humanitarian airlift operation accounted for about 95 percent of the aid delivered during the 3 1/2-year siege of Sarajevo.

On 2 April 1993, NATO troops from Great Britain, France, the Netherlands, Spain, Turkey, Germany, and Italy as well as the United States launched Operation Deny Flight, a no-fly zone for Serbian aircraft over Bosnia-Herzegovina. It enforced a March 1993 UN Security Council Resolution passed to help prevent the war from spreading. The operation also provided close air support to UN Protection Force ground troops serving as peacekeepers, and airstrikes against Serb weapons threatening UN-designated safe areas in Bosnia. The first ANG fighter unit involved was the Connecticut Air National Guard's A-10-equipped 103rd Fighter Group. Aircraft and personnel from the Maryland Air National Guard's 175th Fighter Group and Michigan Air National Guard's 110th Fighter Group joined the contingent from Connecticut. Along with unit personnel, the six Air National Guard and six Air Force Reserve A-10s returned to their home stations in mid-January 1994 after flying 520 sorties and accumulating over 1,400 hours of Deny Flight flying time. Air National Guard tanker support of Deny Flight began in June 1994 with the dispatch of 10 KC-135s and 18 aircrews from six units to Istres Air Base, France, and Pisa Airport, Italy. By the time Deny Flight ended on 20 December 1995, elements of seven Air Guard fighter and 11 air refueling units had participated in it.

Operation Deliberate Force, was initiated in August 1995 after the Bosnian Serb army shelled a Sarajevo marketplace killing 43 civilians and wounding 75 more. A contingent from the 104th Fighter Wing participated in the action. The intensity of the bombing stunned the Serbs. Coupled with victories of an American-trained Croatian-Muslim army in western Bosnia, that operation forced the Serbs to sue for peace. NATO halted the bombing on 14 September 1995, and ended Deliberate Force six days later.

The Air National Guard returned to the Balkans in the mid-1990s as part of the NATO-led peacekeeping force in Bosnia, Operation Joint Guard, and its successor, Operation Joint Forge. Volunteers from 13 Air National Guard airlift units provided 71 C-130s to Joint Forge. On average, ANG airlift deployment packages consisted of approximately 75 personnel and two C-130 aircraft. They were based at Ramstein AB, Germany, to provide the necessary airlift support for U.S. military forces in Bosnia-Herzegovina and other locations across Europe.

==== Air Expeditionary Force (AEF) Concept ====
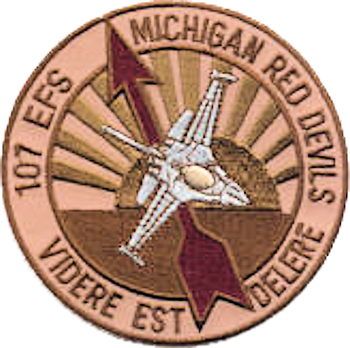
Emblem of the 107th Expeditionary Fighter Squadron, Michigan Air National Guard. Used at Balad Air Base during Operation Iraqi Freedom

In August 1998, the Air Force inaugurated a new concept. Based on experiences during the Persian Gulf War and numerous deployments to the Balkans and other contingency operations, it organized more than 2,000 aircraft, including those of Air Force Reserve and Air National Guard units, into 10 Air Expeditionary Forces (AEFs), later designated as the Aerospace Expeditionary Forces, and, in 2007, the Air Expeditionary Forces. AEFs would rotate in order to ease the strain of increased post-Cold War operations overseas. The AEF promised to spread the burden of deployments more widely among flying units, Active Duty, Air Force Reserve or Air National Guard. Moreover, the timing of rotations became more predictable. Greater predictability would enable Airmen, especially those in the Air Reserve Component, to better manage the competing demands of families, civilian careers, and military service. Air National Guard aviation units would be expected to deploy overseas once every 15 months while support units would do so at 30-month intervals. Driven by those requirements, Air National Guard planners in the National Guard Bureau began to "reengineer" ANG units to better participate in their expeditionary roles. The benefits of this concept became apparent in the events of the early 2000s.

=== Global war on terrorism ===
==== 11 September 2001 ====
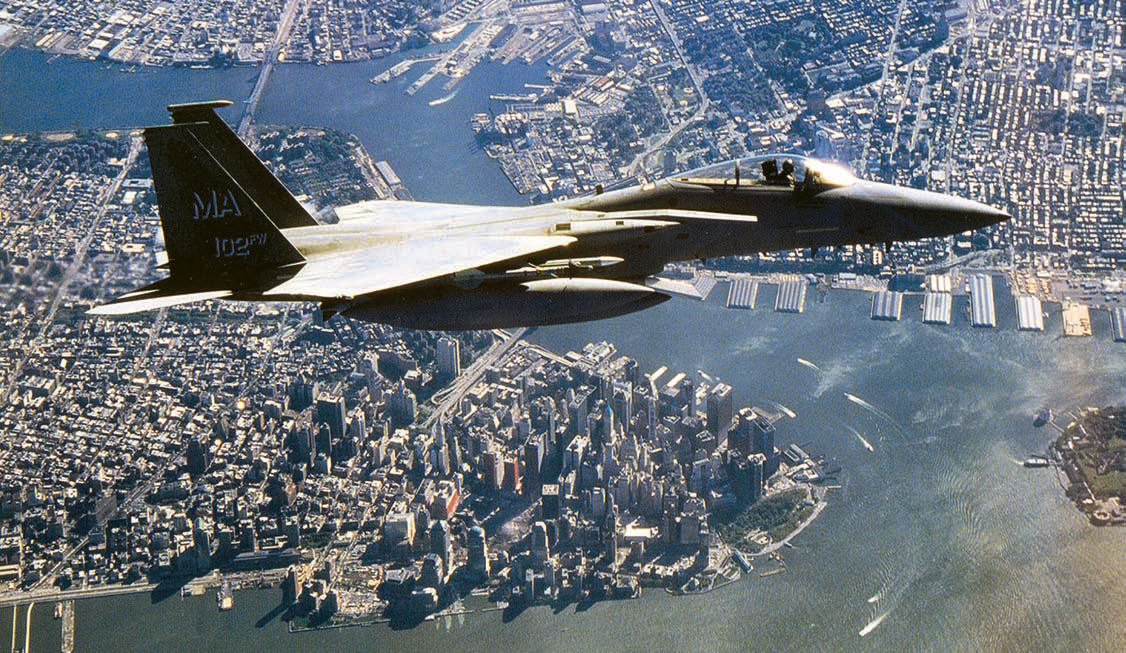
An F-15C Eagle from 102nd Fighter Wing, Massachusetts Air National Guard, flies a combat air patrol over New York City as part of Operation Noble Eagle. F-15s from the 102nd were the first to arrive on scene over the World Trade Center following the September 11 terrorist attacks.

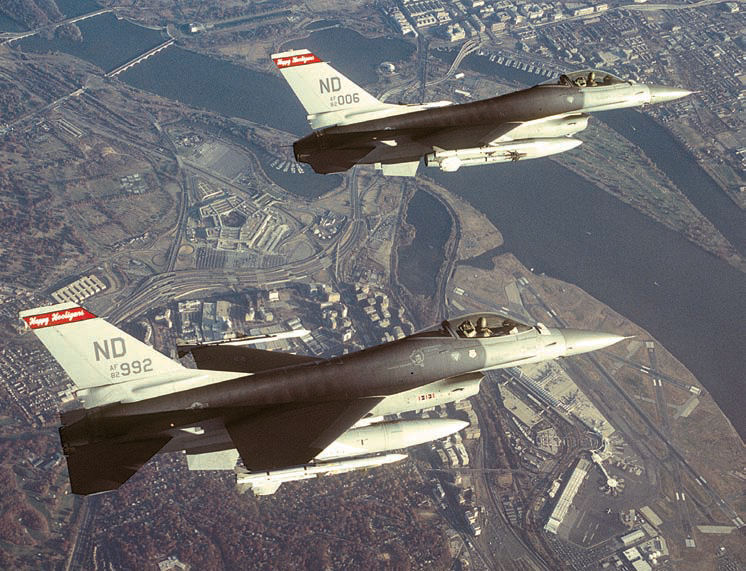
F-16s of the 119th Fighter Wing, North Dakota Air National Guard, flying a combat air patrol over Washington, DC, and the Pentagon in Operation Noble Eagle, November 2001

Defining events for the Air National Guard (ANG) as well as for the United States occurred with the al Qaeda attacks of 11 September 2001 on the World Trade Center in New York City and the Pentagon in Washington, D.C. The only air defense fighter units stationed within the entire northeastern United States belonged to the Air National Guard.

At 8:38 am, the Federal Aviation Administration (FAA) in Boston, Massachusetts, reported a possible hijacking and called the Otis Air National Guard Base control tower on Cape Cod, home to the Massachusetts ANG's 102nd Fighter Wing, to request military assistance. At that time, Major Dan Nash and Lieutenant Colonel Tim Duffy had air defense alert duty for the 102nd. At 8:40 am Colonel Bob Marr, a Massachusetts air national guardsman serving as NORAD's Northeast Air Defense Sector commander, learned from the FAA that American Airlines Flight 11 might have been hijacked. The two pilots immediately suited up and headed for their F-15s. Marr ordered Nash and Duffy into the air; their F-15s were airborne within six minutes and as directed, headed for New York City, 153 miles away. Unknown to the pilots, American Airlines Flight 11 had crashed into the North Tower of the World Trade Center in New York City just as Colonel Marr was delivering his order. Meanwhile, at 8:43 am, the FAA reported another possible hijacking to the Northeast Air Defense Sector. That was Boston to Los Angeles United Airlines Flight 175. At 9:02 am, with the F-15s still 71 miles away, that plane crashed into the World Trade Center's South Tower.

At 9:09 am the pilots of the North Dakota Air National Guards F-16s of the 119th Fighter Wing were standing by, ready to launch, at their forward alert operating location at Langley AFB, Virginia, located about 130 miles southeast of Washington, DC. They were at their battle stations because of a growing general concern about the situation that morning. Seven minutes later, the FAA reported that United Airlines Flight 93, outbound from Newark, New Jersey, to San Francisco, California, might also have been hijacked. The FAA notified the Northeast Air Defense Sector eight minutes later that American Flight 77, a flight from Dulles International Airport, Virginia, near Washington, DC, to Los Angeles, California, also appeared to be the victim of hijackers. At 9:24 am Colonel Marr ordered three F-16s (two alert aircraft and a spare) scrambled from Langley AFB to check out an unidentified intermittent aircraft track heading toward Washington DC. In six minutes, the Langley F-16s were airborne.

In accordance with established NORAD procedures, the F-16s were initially directed to head northeast to avoid some of the most heavily traveled commercial airline routes rather than to fly directly to the Washington, DC, area. Major Dean Eckmann and Major Brad Derrig, plus Captain Craig Borgstrom of the 119th Fighter Wing were directed to fly at maximum subsonic speed, 660 miles per hour. At about 40 miles away, they saw the billowing smoke of American Airlines Flight 77, which had crashed into the Pentagon at 9:43 am. As the North Dakota air guardsmen neared Washington, DC, Major Eckmann, the flight lead, set up a patrol over the nation's capital with the help of air traffic controllers at the Northeast Air Defense Sector.

On 22 May 2002, a Joint Resolution was passed by the United States Congress recognizing the members of the 102nd Fighter Wing for their actions on 11 September 2001. The resolution in part states:

Whereas on the morning of 11 September 2001, the 102nd Fighter Wing of the Massachusetts Air National Guard became the Nation's first airborne responder to the terrorist attacks of that day when it scrambled two F-15 fighter aircraft just six minutes after being informed of the terrorist hijackings of commercial airliners.

==== Operation Noble Eagle ====
As a result of the September 11 attacks in 2001, homeland defense became the top national defense priority. The enhanced defense of North America and military support to civilian government agencies, known as Operation Noble Eagle, began early the next day.

During the first 24 hours of the crisis, 34 Air National Guard fighter units flew 179 missions. Eighteen tanker units generated 78 aircraft in the same time period. Through 28 September, for example, the Alabama Air National Guard's 117th Air Refueling Wing kept aircraft aloft on a continuous basis. Air National Guard units also contributed 111 C-130 aircraft for movement of personnel and equipment to needed locations, and more than 3,000 ANG security forces personnel supported the mission, augmenting civilian security police as necessary. A week after the attacks, Secretary of Defense Donald Rumsfeld announced the call up of over more than 5,000 members of the Air National Guard and Air Force Reserve to support the nation's increased security requirements. On 22 September, President George W. Bush mobilized about 5,100 more members of the air reserve components, including approximately 3,000 air refueling and about 130 security specialists.

Guardsmen gained national visibility starting 27 September when President George W. Bush asked the governors for their temporary help at commercial airports, which had reopened a few days after 9/11 with new security restrictions. In the airports they would "Temporarily augment the civilian airport security function of the nation's commercial airports with a trained, armed, and highly visible military presence." For more than seven months, several thousand guardsmen performed those security duties, with additional guardsmen called into service during the Thanksgiving, Christmas, and New Year holiday period. Although the Army Guard provided the vast majority of the enhanced airport security force, several hundred Air National Guard personnel also participated.

Combat Air Patrols (CAPs) began to be flown 24/7 over major cities in the United States. ANG squadrons at 26 bases were put at tremendous strain to support the operations. The Air National Guard ran continuous round-the-clock combat air patrols over New York City and Washington, D.C., until spring 2002. In addition, when key events occurred such as the 2002 Winter Olympics in Utah, Space Shuttle launches in Florida, baseball's World Series and football's Super Bowl, similar air patrols helped provide security. The Air National Guard also flew random patrols over various urban areas; nuclear power plants; major military installations such as MacDill AFB, Florida, Peterson AFB, Colorado, Offutt AFB, Nebraska and Scott AFB, Illinois that were home to various combatant command headquarters; weapons storage facilities and laboratories. Because estimates of the nation's security situation became more optimistic, in spring 2002, the Air Force eliminated the continuous patrols and substituted random ones by the summer.

==== Operation Enduring Freedom ====
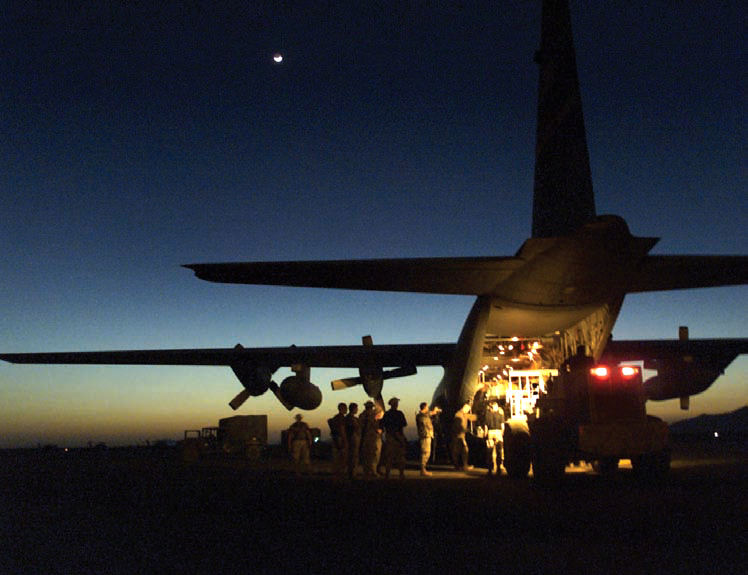
Personnel assigned to the 321st Air Expeditionary Squadron offloading supplies from a C-130H Hercules aircraft assigned to the 187th Airlift Squadron, 153rd Airlift Wing, Wyoming Air National Guard, at Kandahar, Afghanistan, during Operation Enduring Freedom

On 20 September 2001, President Bush told a televised joint session of Congress and the American people that Osama bin Laden and his al Qaeda network were responsible for the recent terrorist attacks on the United States. The refusal of the Taliban to comply resulted in the United States taking military action to achieve the president's demands, the action given the name Operation Enduring Freedom.

The ANG was involved even before the fighting in Afghanistan began. With the war imminent, the Air Force quickly established an airlift operations plan that included active duty, Guard, and Reserve components. It became one of the most extensive operations in Air Force history. Furthermore, the Air Force met the logistical needs of that operation despite the severe shortage of strategic airlift and troublesome maintenance needs of the older planes.

Shortly after the terrorist attacks on 9/11 and weeks before the first U.S. bomb was dropped over Afghanistan, the Air Force established air bridges to help funnel material and personnel overseas to support multiple operations in conjunction with Enduring Freedom. Air National Guard tanker units received orders by 20 September 2001, to be in their deployed locations before the start of their air bridge operations. Some ANG tanker units also flew humanitarian support missions. By using European bases, the Air Force could transfer cargo from the larger aircraft to smaller planes, refuel aircraft on the ground, exchange flight crews, give crews rest opportunities, and repair broken aircraft.

The Air National Guard contributed two C-141 Starlifter units, the 155th Airlift Squadron / 164th Airlift Wing, Tennessee Air National Guard; and the 183rd Airlift Squadron / 172nd Airlift Wing, Mississippi Air National Guard, to the strategic airlift mission. The Air National Guard's sole C-5 Galaxy unit, the 137th Airlift Squadron / 105th Airlift Wing, New York Air National Guard at Stewart Air National Guard Base in Newburgh, New York, also contributed to the operation. Through the ANG's airlift participation in Europe, the Regular Air Force and Air Force Reserve (Associate) C-17 Globemaster IIIs could support Enduring Freedom directly.

When the war began, only Air National Guard units assigned to Air Force Special Operations Command deployed directly to Afghanistan to support combat operations. Typically, ANG special operations units in 13-man teams first went to active duty bases in the United States, and later to overseas locations.

The 169th Fighter Wing, South Carolina Air National Guard, was the first ANG fighter unit to deploy to Southwest Asia in direct support of the air war over Afghanistan. It sent over 200 personnel and six F-16CJs in January 2002 to Al Udeid Air Base in Doha, Qatar, to assist air combat operations over Afghanistan. In particular, they provided Joint Direct Attack Munitions (JDAMs) against Taliban and al Qaeda positions, the only Air Force fighter unit in the theater to do so. F-16s sometimes were also configured for Cluster Bomb Units (CBUw). In addition, F-16 pilots sometimes fired their 20mm gun against ground targets. Missions could last up to 10 hours with multiple air refuelings. After so many hours strapped in their seats, pilots generally received one to three days of crew rest. The unit returned to South Carolina on 3 April 2002.

The Pennsylvania Air National Guard's 103rd Fighter Squadron of the 111th Fighter Wing, became the first A-10 ANG unit to deploy directly to Afghanistan. From December 2002 to January 2003, the 111th Fighter Wing deployed personnel and sent its aircraft to Bagram Air Base, Afghanistan to carry out ground support missions for both United States as well as Afghan Northern Alliance ground forces. In March 2003, the 104th Fighter Squadron of Maryland's 175th Wing deployed to Afghanistan. While there, it flew all the A-10 combat missions for Operation Enduring Freedom.

===== Takur Ghar =====
For Operation Anaconda, its commander, Army Major General Franklin L. Hagenbeck, directed coalition forces, U.S. soldiers and Afghan forces, to destroy remaining al Qaeda and Taliban forces in an area located roughly 65 nautical miles south of the Afghan capital, Kabul. One reconnaissance team in two helicopters landed on Takur Ghar, Ghar, a snowcapped, 10,200-foot mountain where temperatures at the top reached 40 °F (4 °C) during the day and dropped to a negative five at night.

One helicopter carried a Navy SEAL team and an Air Force combat controller, Technical Sergeant John Chapman. As the SEAL team disem-barked, automatic weapons fire laced the helicopter's side while a rocket propelled grenade ripped into it. The crew chief yelled, "We're taking fire! Go! Go! Go!" and the SEAL team rushed back inside. As the pilots added power to evade the heavy ground fire, the damaged helicopter bucked violently, causing Navy SEAL Petty Officer 1st Class Neil Roberts, who was standing on the ramp, to fall about 12 feet to the ground below. The helicopter escaped the ambush and crash-landed about seven kilometers north of where Petty Officer Roberts fell. The second helicopter rescued the other SEALs and Sergeant Chapman but after returning to their base, they decided to try and rescue Petty Officer Roberts.

Regardless of the danger they knew the al Qaeda would treat Roberts badly and time was running out for him. Despite intense ground fire, the six men successfully returned to Takur Ghar. Nevertheless, the battle continued and Sergeant Chapman was killed along with several enemy fighters. Surrounded by gunfire, the men on the ground called upon a Quick Reaction Force (QRF), designed for such emergencies. Those forces consisted of 23 men and two helicopters. The team included Tech Sergeant Miller. "We were notified that we would be launching in 45 minutes," he recalled, "and were going into [an al Qaeda and Taliban] infested area." Also on the team were Army Rangers. During Operation Enduring Freedom, Rangers and special operations formed the focal point of the U.S. ground campaign. Because of communications failures, the Quick Reaction Force landed in the same spot as the previous helicopters and, like them, was greeted with gunfire. Miller's helicopter managed to land, and the QRF called in close air support. For the next five and a half hours, they battled with the enemy. Three Rangers died and others were wounded.

According to Sergeant Miller, "We continued to treat the patients, continued moving ammunition and grenades to where they were needed. I grabbed a radio … and set up satellite communication and then returned to the rear." Tech Sergeant Miller and Senior Airman Jason Cunningham, like Miller, a pararescueman, worked hard to keep the patients from succumbing to hypothermia. They put them in the helicopter and removed its insulation and wrapped it around the wounded Rangers. In addition, they used the majority of the fluids available in the medical kits and anything else, including the heaters packed in their food rations. With the help of the additional Rangers and more air strikes, they took the hill, killing many al Qaeda combatants. They also recovered the bodies of Petty Officer Roberts and Sergeant Chapman.

Approximately 10 minutes after the Rangers took control of the hill, they began to receive more frequent enemy mortar and automatic weapons fire. Although combat air support prevailed, the enemy wounded an Army medic and fatally wounded Airman Cunningham. At that point the Quick Reaction Force had 11 wounded and seven dead. After 17 hours on the mountaintop, a nighttime rescue took place and the ordeal was over. Operation Anaconda continued for another 19 days.

By March 2002, ANG C-130 units had flown 55 percent of the missions for the Afghanistan war. The 193rd Special Operations Wing of the Pennsylvania Air National Guard, using the EC-130E Commando Solo aircraft, performed an unusual mission in Afghanistan: psychological operations (PSYOPS). Since 1968, the 193rd had been handling airborne psychological operations missions. The EC-130E acquired the mission name Commando Solo during the 1990s, when the aircraft was modified to handle color television operations. One of the first ANG flying units deployed to the area, the 193rd began transmitting by the end of October 2001. For almost six months the unit relayed broadcasts of Voice of America in the Dari and Pashtu languages and Radio Free Europe/Radio Liberty in Uzbek, Tajik, and Persian. According to a White House spokesman, the Commando Solo missions gave the Afghan people "full knowledge about what is happening in Afghanistan from a source other than a repressive Taliban regime." The 193rd remained in the region until ground psychological warfare operations stations were safely established.

Once the Iraq conflict began in March 2003, the military began to reduce its resources in Afghanistan. Yet the reliance on using the Air National Guard and Air Force Reserve units, aircraft and personnel there continues to the present supporting the combat operations under United States Air Forces Central (USAFCENT). Air national guardsmen and aircraft deploy to Afghanistan routinely as part of the Air Expeditionary Units at bases there.

==== Operation Iraqi Freedom ====
On 18 March 2003, the United States and coalition forces launched the invasion of Iraq in order to remove Saddam Hussein's regime from power, the invasion being designated Operation Iraqi Freedom. In addition to flying units, such as fighter, air refueling, airlift, special operations and rescue, the ANG also provided a robust force of over 3,530 additional personnel for the expeditionary combat support functions and many Air National Guard senior officers held command positions during the war.

===== Siege of the Haditha Dam =====
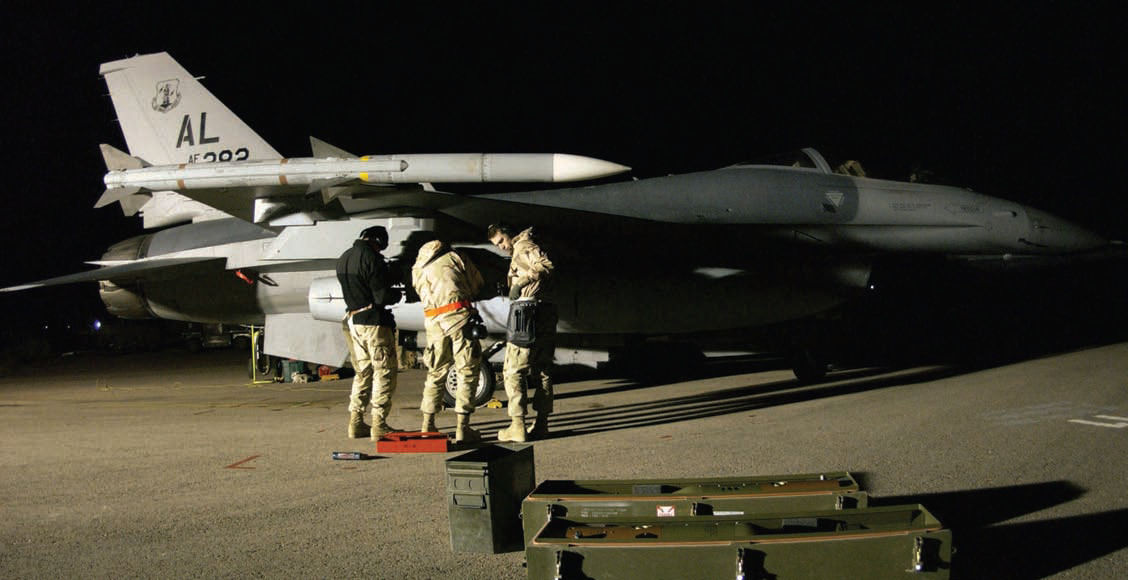
Munitions personnel from the 160th Fighter Squadron, 187th Fighter Wing, Alabama Air National Guard, assigned to the 410th Air Expeditionary Wing at a forward deployed location work on guided munitions on the pylon of one of their F-16C Fighting Falcons. The Falcon has an AIM-120A Advanced Medium Air-to-Air Missile fixed to the wing tip. The 410th Air Expeditionary Wing prepares the aircraft for take off for sorties on A-Day, the commencement of the air war for Operation Iraqi Freedom, 19 March 2003.

As operations began, Army Rangers embarked on a mission to protect the Haditha Dam from being destroyed by Iraqi forces. The Rangers expected the operation to last approximately 24 hours. Instead it took them more than 12 days. The dam is a critical source of water and electrical in western Iraq. If the Iraqis succeeded in blowing up the dam, the releasing waters would flood the down-river areas, causing a humanitarian and environmental disaster.

The Rangers expected the dam to be well defended. In preparation for the assault on the dam, fighters assigned to the 410th Air Expeditionary Wing (410 AEW) conducted preparatory air strikes against Iraqi forces in the dam's vicinity. Air support for special forces in the battle came from various coalition aircraft including U.S. Army Special Operations Aviation units. However, that battle became one of the defining operations for the AEW, and in particular, Air National Guard pilots. The 410th was responsible for providing combat search and rescue capability for western and central Iraq. During the month-long air campaign over the western Iraqi desert, the A-10 and F-16 Air National Guard pilots assigned to the AEW were involved in countless missions supporting special forces teams in need of close air support. The highly experienced Air National Guard pilots assigned to the AEW, especially the A-10 pilots, helped ensure the successful employment of close air support for friendly forces fighting to retain the Haditha Dam.

AH-6 helicopters of the U.S. Army's 160th Special Operations Aviation Regiment and F-16s from the 410 AEW provided air cover as the Rangers took their convoy to Haditha. During the night of 1 April 2003, with support from the 410th, the Rangers seized the dam, a power station, and a transformer yard while facing light to moderate enemy resistance. Several Iraqis were killed and wounded; others, including 25 civilian workers, were taken prisoner. As daylight broke over the dam, the Rangers began taking increasing enemy fire from the south as well as coordinated attacks at both ends of the dam. Although the Rangers repelled the initial assault, Iraqi counterattacks continued with heavy mortar and artillery shells that rained down on the Rangers. Fortunately, the Rangers had ample air support from the 410th which attacked several mortar positions. Even without the protection of darkness, the Air National Guard A-10s attacked numerous enemy positions. At nightfall the Iraqis resumed their attacks against the Rangers, but once again close air supported the U.S. forces. A single bomb obliterated the attackers and shattered every window in the dam complex. Nevertheless, the siege continued for ten more days.

The Rangers on the dam were greatly outnumbered. Nevertheless, the combined efforts of a Forward Air Controller-qualified pilot (FAC), a combat search and rescue (CSAR) pilot, and observation posts manned by additional Rangers and Air Force enlisted terminal attack controllers (who cleared airborne weapons for release) ensured the Rangers on the dam would not be overrun. That operation reflected the typical attitude held by Air National Guard aviators, especially A-10 pilots, who believed that when ground troops needed help, the pilots would remain as long as possible to, "... lay it on the line more and expose themselves more over the target area." Even when the Rangers were not taking enemy fire, the A-10s provided cover so the Rangers could catch a few hours of sleep. The 410th fighters also supplied air cover during medical evacuation missions for killed and wounded Rangers.

During the twelfth day of the siege, the outnumbered Rangers continued to face repeated attacks by the enemy force. The Air National Guard A-10 and F-16 pilots realized early in the battle that the close air support they provided was the vital element that kept the Iraqi forces at bay, a matter of life and death for the Rangers. In the end the coalition forces prevailed. Military experts believed that without the air support, especially the A-10s, the Rangers would not have won the battle. Not only did the coalition forces secure the Haditha Dam complex, but they seriously reduced the fighting effectiveness of the Iraqi Armored Task Force in the Haditha area.

===== Intelligence operations =====
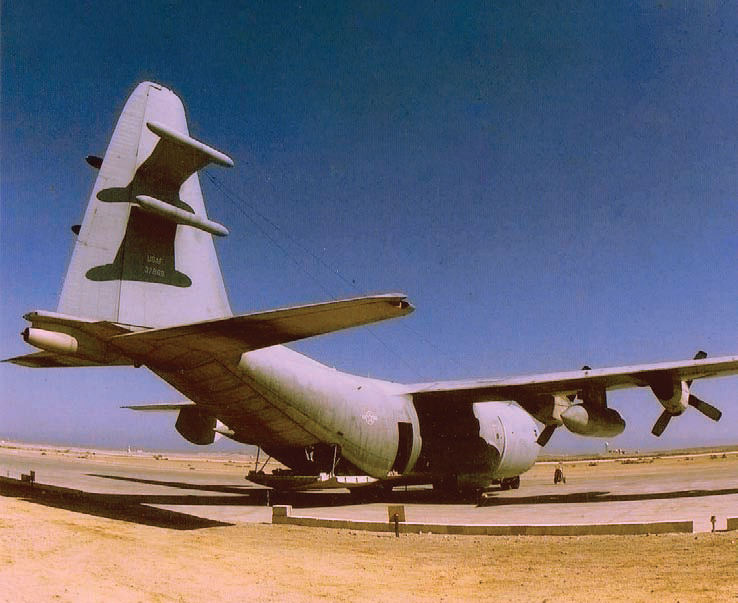
Commando Solo EC-130E from the 193rd Special Operations Wing, Pennsylvania Air National Guard, sits on the ramp at undisclosed location during Operations Enduring Freedom and Iraqi Freedom in late 2005

Air National Guard intelligence personnel deployed overseas and supported the war effort in signals intelligence by flying Senior Scout missions and augmented RC-135V/W Rivet Joint ELINT crews to "monitor the electronic activity of adversaries." Although their pilots sat at controls in the United States, Air National Guardsmen also "flew" RQ-4 Global Hawk and MQ-1 Predator unmanned aerial vehicle intelligence missions in Southwest Asia.

Operation Iraqi Freedom's intelligence collection efforts were enhanced by the initial combat employment of the Air Force's first and only "blended" wing: the newly formed 116th Air Control Wing, composed of both ANG and active duty Air Force personnel based in Robins AFB, Georgia. The wing deployed nine of its 11 assigned E-8 Joint STARS aircraft to the Iraqi Freedom theater as well as over 600 unit personnel including one-tenth of the aircrews. Air National Guardsmen composed about one-fourth of the Wing's deployed personnel. Although the wing has since reverted to an all-ANG organization, it continues to be integral to operation of the E-8 Joint STARS weapon system.

The 193rd Special Operations Wing of the Pennsylvania Air National Guard deployed its EC-130 Commando Solo aircraft for a variety of PSYOPS support to coalition agencies in Iraq. Flying from March to June 2003, its missions apparently fulfilled their goals. According to an Iraqi prisoner of war and former mid-level intelligence officer, the population in southern Iraq considered the coalition radio broadcasts more truthful than state-owned media. The leaflets also had a significant impact on the morale of Iraqi military and prompted considerations to surrender. The Iraqis concluded that U.S. planes could as easily target them with bombs as leaflets if their intent was lethal.

===== Support operations =====
As in Afghanistan, the Air National Guard contributed significant airlift capability to Operation Iraqi Freedom. Thirteen of ANG's 25 airlift units participated, including 72 of 124 Air Force C-130s. Among their missions, Air National Guard C-130 crews airlifted elements of the 82nd Airborne Division and the 3rd Marine Expeditionary Force. Those crews also flew one of the first day/night airlift missions into an Iraqi air base and delivered the first humanitarian supplies into Baghdad International Airport. During Operation Iraqi Freedom's first six months, Air National Guard C-130 crews airlifted 22,000 tons of cargo, 47,000 passengers, and flew 8,600 sorties in 21,000 hours.

As essential to the war effort as were C-130s, A-10s, and piloted reconnaissance and surveillance aircraft, they could not have completed their missions efficiently without aerial refueling. During the war in Iraq, the Air Force deployed 200 tanker aircraft based at 15 locations. Air National Guard KC-135 tankers provided one-third of the Air Force refueling aircraft deployed for Operation Iraqi Freedom, and an additional 35 ANG tanker aircraft conducted air bridge operations.

The Air National Guard also deployed air traffic control personnel, maintainers, and airspace managers. Over 27 percent of the total Air Force civil engineering force in Iraq came from the ANG; other Air Guard engineers supported Iraqi Freedom while operating in several other countries.

The Iraqi conflict continued through 2011 and the Air National Guard continued its involvement. By 2004 nearly 40 percent of the total Air Force aircraft deployed for overseas operations were assigned to the Air National Guard. The ANG supported Air Expeditionary Force deployments to Iraq throughout the 2000s, until the withdrawal of U.S. troops from Iraq in 2011.

=== State and local government support ===
==== Natural disasters ====
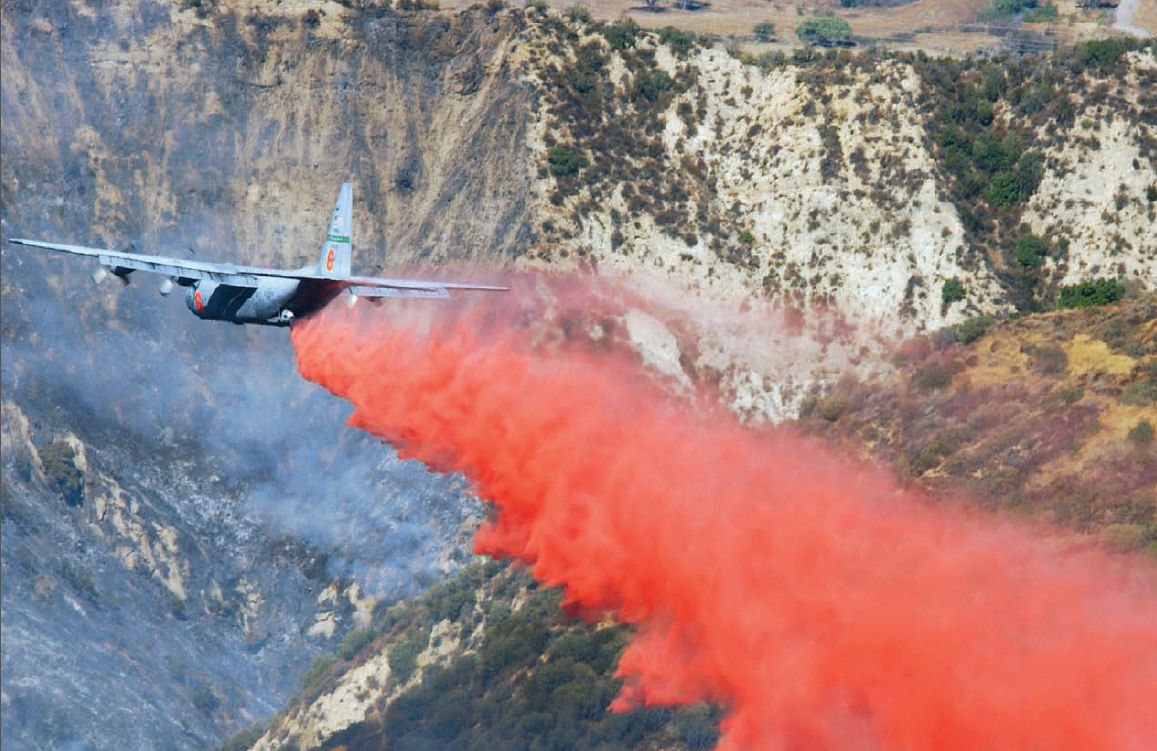
A C-130E Hercules cargo aircraft from the 146th Airlift Wing, California Air National Guard, rigged with a Modular Airborne Fire Fighting System (MAFFS) making a Phos-Chek fire retardant drop on the Simi Fire in Southern California, 28 October 2003

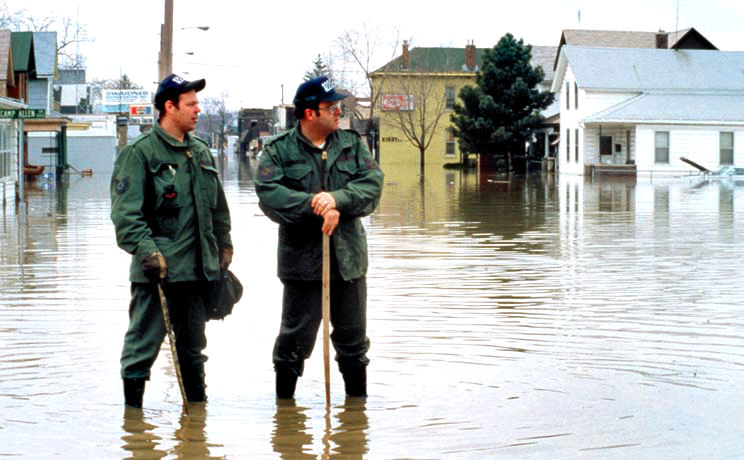
Members of the Indiana Air National Guard participating in an emergency operation after recent flooding in Fort Wayne, Indiana, 1 March 1982

Traditionally, governors called out National Guard units when faced with natural but localized disasters such as blizzards, earthquakes, floods, and forest fires. The president could also federalize them in major disasters that threatened to overwhelm the resources of individual states or communities. According to the National Guard Bureau, "The indigenous skills and capabilities National Guardsmen to respond to natural disasters are the same skills and capabilities that enable us to successfully respond to potential terrorist threats."

The Air National Guard's main tool for fighting forest fires is the Modular Airborne Fire Fighting System (MAFFS), which has undergone several updates since its first use in September 1971 by the California Air National Guard's then-146th Tactical Airlift Wing and the North Carolina Air National Guard's then 145th Tactical Airlift Group. Housed in C-130s, MAFFS could disperse up to 27,000 pounds ... almost 3,000 gallons ... of commercial fire retardants or an equivalent amount of water. Newer aircraft like the C-130J carry the MAFFS II, which carry even more fire retardant, can disperse it more rapidly over a wider area, and is easier to recharge after a mission than its predecessor.

Blizzards also created the need for National Guard support. Often both Army National Guard and Air National Guard units assisted with health and welfare matters, conducted debris removal and power generation, and provided supply and transportation support in connection with snowstorms. For example, a Christmas-time 2006 blizzard at the airport hub of Denver International Airport closed that facility down for two days. Army and air national guardsmen took food and water to thousands of travelers trapped there. In the same storm, western Kansas received between 15 and 36 inches of snow with drifts as high as 13 feet. The Air National Guard not only assisted people, but also dropped bales of hay to feed stranded cattle.

==== Hurricane Katrina ====
On 29 August 2005, the largest natural disaster the Air National Guard faced in its then 58-year history began when Hurricane Katrina hit the United States Gulf Coast. The most severe damage came from a 30-plus-foot storm surge along the Mississippi coast and the north shore of Lake Pontchartrain in Louisiana and breaks in the levies along a canal in New Orleans. Several weeks later Hurricane Rita devastated portions of western Louisiana and eastern Texas, and then the less severe Hurricane Wilma damaged Florida.

By the time Katrina made landfall, the Air National Guard had mobilized 840 personnel in Florida, Mississippi, Louisiana, and Texas. Although the Air National Guard had a domestic mission to support local authorities in rescue and relief operations following a natural disaster, its utilization for such missions had been limited primarily to a select group of career fields such as civil engineers, medical personnel, and services. In response to Hurricane Katrina, ANG units in all 54 states and territories responded to the recovery efforts in the Gulf States, with the Mississippi Air National Guard's Jackson Air National Guard Base serving as a hub and operating location for numerous active duty, Air National Guard, Air Force Reserve, Naval Reserve and Army National Guard aircraft. The ANG flew 73 percent of the airlift for the relief operations including its brand new C-130J and C-17 Globemaster III aircraft. In addition, ANG Combat Search and Rescue pararescuemen and Combat Controllers saved over 1,300 victims.

ANG personnel arrived on the Gulf Coast on 29 August, a few hours after the storm's arrival. Personnel from the Florida Air National Guard's 202nd RED HORSE Squadron of the 125th Fighter Wing were some of the first to enter the area. Seventy-three engineers from this unit worked in hard-hit Hancock County, Mississippi. Initially establishing a basecamp for other emergency personnel, the unit began repairs in Hancock County communities working nearly around-the-clock on multiple construction projects to restore power, clean and repair schools, and refurbish electrical supplies. As a Florida unit, the 202nd had worked many other hurricanes. However, Katrina's devastation surpassed anything in their previous experience.

To support rescue and relief operations in New Orleans, the Air National Guard used Naval Air Station Joint Reserve Base New Orleans, in Belle Chasse, Louisiana, on the Mississippi River's West Bank. Within five hours of its orders, the 136th Airlift Wing of the Texas Air National Guard deployed 41 Air National Guardsmen to Belle Chasse. Less than 24 hours later, a C-130H landed at the air station with members of the Louisiana Air National Guard's 159th Fighter Wing. Soon more aircraft arrived, delivering troops and supplies for New Orleans; offloaded pallets were stacked 10 deep on the aircraft parking ramp. Instead of heading into the flooded city, the 136th team remained at Belle Chasse and, within 36 hours of arriving, it established a fully functioning Air Terminal Operations Center and was keeping pace with the demanding mission schedule. That Aerial Port team, augmented by U.S. Navy cargo handlers and members of the 133rd Aerial Port Squadron, 133rd Airlift Wing of the Minnesota Air National Guard, handled over 124 missions with 1.5 million pounds of cargo and 974 passengers in one day. As one of its most crucial tasks, the Texas squadron downloaded the German pump system used to drain the city of New Orleans because its own pumps were inundated. It also uploaded two KC-135s with 140 kennels filled with rescued dogs bound for adoption in Arizona.

=== Operation Deep Freeze ===
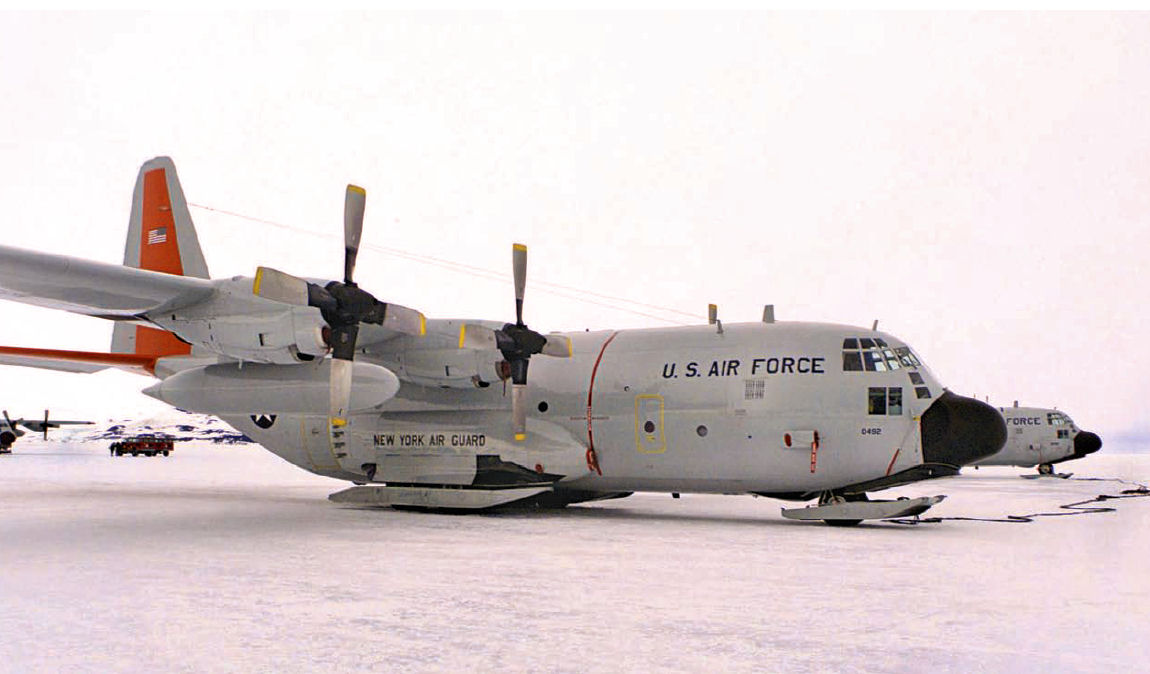
LC-130Hs equipped with landing skis, operated by the 139th Airlift Squadron, 109th Airlift Wing, New York Air National Guard, parked on the ice pack at McMurdo Station at Ross Island in Antarctica during Operation Deep Freeze 2001. The unit operates six LC-130s between Christchurch, New Zealand, and a number of U.S. National Science Foundation stations located on the Antarctic ice pack, 5 November 2001. (Photographer: MSgt Joe Cupido, Air Force photo)

The Air National Guard also participates in noncombat support missions that sometimes take it beyond the U.S. boundaries. For example, in Operation Winter Freeze, from November 2004 to January 2005, nearly 250 Army and air national guardsmen provided assistance to U.S. Customs and Border Protection (CBP) along 295 miles of the United States-Canada border. That operation included military personnel from U.S. Northern Command's Joint Task Force North who helped the Border Patrol to, "... keep potential terrorists out of the country and to break up smuggling rings that try to get them in." [In order] to detect, deter, and monitor suspicious actions ... Air Guard crews flew twin-engine, C-26 airplanes out of Syracuse, New York"

The New York Air National Guard's 109th Airlift Wing operates ski-equipped LC-130 Hercules transports that fly into arctic regions. In 2006, two LC-130s closed the 2006 Operation Deep Freeze located at McMurdo Station near the South Pole. The mission ended because the temperature dropped to almost minus −50 °F (−46 °C) in three days. Since 1988, the squadron had provided the air supply bridge to McMurdo, landing with wheels on an ice runway near the station. However, as it got colder, the ski-equipped LC-130s landed on a snow-covered skiway on the Ross Ice Shelf a few miles from the station.

In the spring and summer, the 109th heads toward the North Pole where it supports the National Science Foundation and several other nations in Greenland and above the Arctic Circle.

=== Leak of classified information ===
In April 2023, Jack Teixeira, a 21-year-old member of the intelligence wing of the Massachusetts Air National Guard, was arrested for unauthorized removal and transmission of classified US intelligence related to the Russian invasion of Ukraine. The leaked documents, which first appeared in an online group linked to Teixeira, strained relations with American allies and exposed weaknesses in the Ukrainian military. The arrest was conducted by the FBI at Teixeira's residence in North Dighton, Massachusetts. On 11 December 2023, the United States Air Force disciplined 15 other individuals connected to the investigation of airman Jack Teixera.

== Organization ==
=== Leadership ===
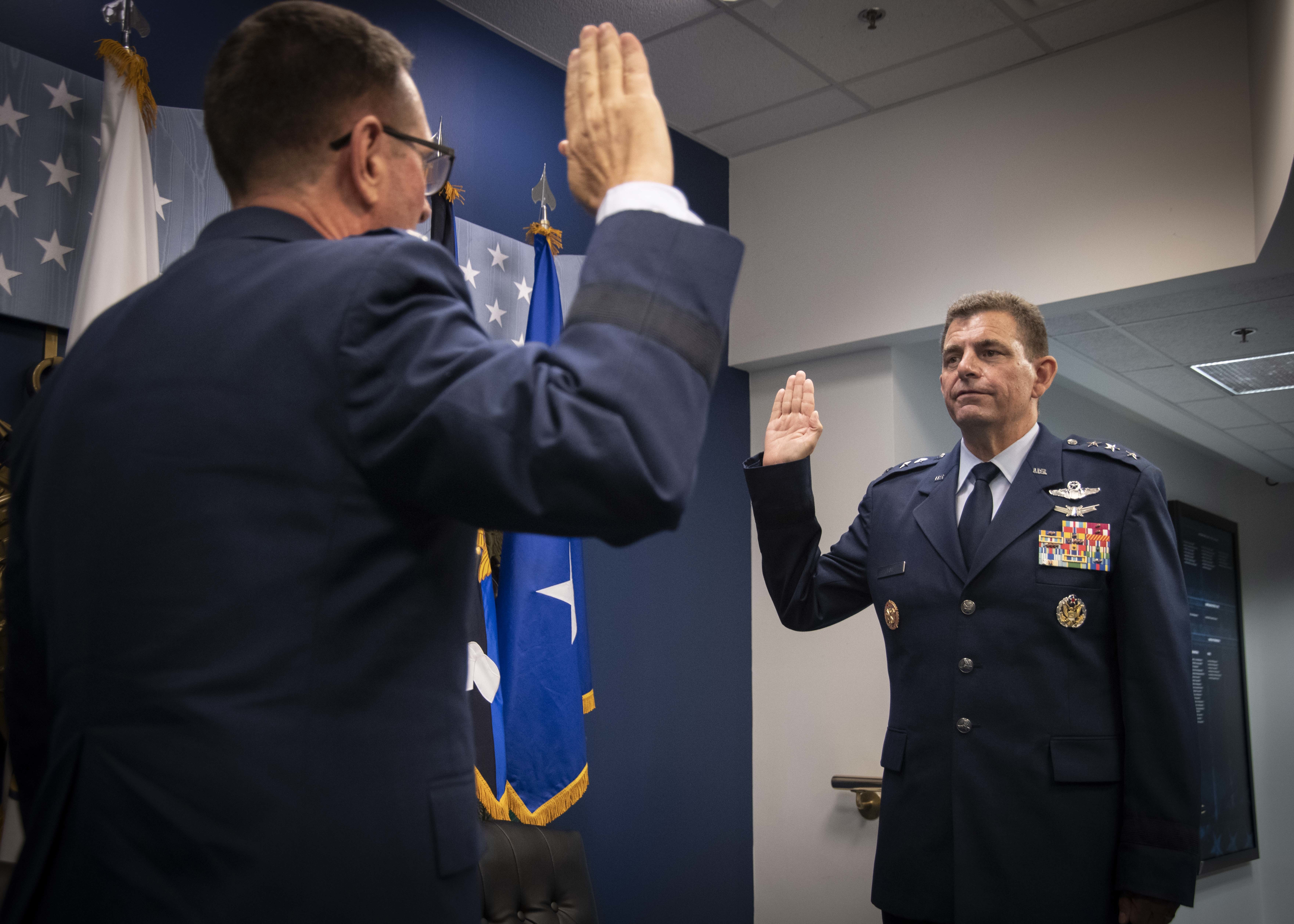
U.S. Air Force Gen. Joseph L. Lengyel, the 28th Chief of the National Guard Bureau, conducts a transition of responsibility order for newly promoted Lt. Gen. Michael A. Loh during a Change of Responsibility ceremony at the Pentagon July 28, 2020.

This is a list of the senior leaders or Generals of the Air National Guard. The title has changed over time: The Assistant Chief, National Guard Bureau for Air; Chief, Air Force Division, National Guard Bureau; Director Air National Guard.

No.	Commander		Term		
No.	Portrait	Name	Took office	Left office	Term length
1	William A. R. Robertson	Colonel; William A. R. Robertson	28 November 1945	October 1948	~ 2 years, 308 days
2	George G. Finch	Major General; George G. Finch	October 1948	25 September 1950	~ 1 year, 359 days
3	Earl T. Ricks	Major General; Earl T. Ricks	13 October 1950	4 January 1954	3 years, 83 days
4	Winston P. Wilson	Major General; Winston P. Wilson	26 January 1954	5 August 1962	8 years, 191 days
5	I. G. Brown	Major General; I. G. Brown	6 August 1962	19 April 1974	11 years, 256 days
6	John J. Pesch	Major General; John J. Pesch	20 April 1974	31 January 1977	2 years, 286 days
7	John T. Guice	Major General; John T. Guice	1 February 1977	1 April 1981	4 years, 59 days
8	John B. Conaway	Major General; John B. Conaway	1 April 1981	1 November 1988	7 years, 214 days
9	Philip G. Killey	Major General; Philip G. Killey	1 November 1988	28 January 1994	5 years, 88 days
10	Donald W. Shepperd	Major General; Donald W. Shepperd	28 January 1994	28 January 1998	4 years, 0 days
11	Paul A. Weaver Jr.	Major General; Paul A. Weaver Jr.	28 January 1998	3 December 2001	3 years, 309 days
–	David A. Brubaker	Brigadier General; David A. Brubaker; Acting	3 December 2001	3 June 2002	182 days
12	Daniel James III	Lieutenant General; Daniel James III	3 June 2002	20 May 2006	3 years, 351 days
13	Craig R. McKinley	Lieutenant General; Craig R. McKinley	20 May 2006	17 November 2008	2 years, 181 days
–	Emmett R. Titshaw Jr.	Major General; Emmett R. Titshaw Jr. Acting	17 November 2008	2 February 2009	77 days
14	Harry M. Wyatt III	Lieutenant General; Harry M. Wyatt III	2 February 2009	30 January 2013	3 years, 363 days
15	Stanley E. Clarke III	Lieutenant General; Stanley E. Clarke III	22 March 2013	18 December 2015	2 years, 271 days
–	Brian G. Neal	Major General; Brian G. Neal; Acting	18 December 2015	10 May 2016	144 days
16	L. Scott Rice	Lieutenant General; L. Scott Rice	10 May 2016	28 July 2020	4 years, 79 days
17	Michael A. Loh	Lieutenant General; Michael A. Loh	28 July 2020	7 June 2024	3 years, 315 days
–	Duke A. Pirak	Major General; Duke A. Pirak	7 June 2024	31 July 2026	2 years, 54 days
–	Randal K. Efferson	Major General; Randal K. Efferson; Acting	1 August 2026	Incumbent	107 days

=== Title 32 and Title 10 structure ===
Established under Title 10 and Title 32 of the U.S. Code, the Air National Guard is part of the state National Guard and is divided up into units stationed in each of the 50 states, the District of Columbia (D.C.), the Commonwealth of Puerto Rico, Guam, and the United States Virgin Islands.

The current distribution of ANG units and their associated authorized manpower slots is based on the respective state, district, commonwealth, or territorial population. However, this distribution of units, personnel, aircraft and resources is predicated on what those populations were in calendar year 1958 and has not been updated since. This has resulted in states with high population growth in the ensuing decades such as Florida having fewer ANG personnel relative to state population and fewer wings with unit-assigned aircraft than states such as Alabama, Pennsylvania, or West Virginia.

Despite initial post-Cold War actions in the 1990s by previous USAF leaders to maintain force structure in the Air Reserve Component (ARC), i.e., the Air National Guard and the Air Force Reserve, subsequent budgetary constraints in the 21st century have led to some ANG units losing their manned aircraft missions for unmanned/remotely piloted aircraft missions, or totally losing a flying mission and converting to a variety of non-flying missions.

ANG units typically operate under Title 32 USC. When operating under Title 10 USC all ANG units are operationally gained by an active-duty major command of the Air Force or the U.S. Space Force. ANG units of the Combat Air Forces (CAF) based in the Continental United States (CONUS), plus a single air control squadron of the Puerto Rico ANG, are gained by the Air Combat Command (ACC). CONUS-based ANG units in the Mobility Air Forces (MAF), plus the Puerto Rico ANG's airlift wing and the Virgin Islands ANG's civil engineering squadron are gained by the Air Mobility Command (AMC) The exception to this rule is the District of Columbia Air National Guard (DC ANG). As a federal district, the units of the DC ANG are under the direct jurisdiction of the President of the United States through the office of the Commanding General, District of Columbia National Guard.

In the "state" role, the Air National Guard may be "called up" for active duty by the governors to help respond to domestic emergencies and disasters, such as those caused by hurricanes, floods, fires, and earthquakes. In the case of the D.C. Air National Guard, the Adjutant General of the District of Columbia reports to the Mayor of the District of Columbia, who may only activate DC Air Guard and Army Guard assets for limited activation after consultation and approval of the President of the United States.

With the consent of the state governor, members or units of the Air National Guard may be appointed, temporarily or indefinitely, to be federally recognized members of the armed forces, in the active or inactive (e.g., reserve) service of the United States. If federally recognized, the member or unit becomes part of the Air National Guard of the United States, which is one of two reserve components of the U.S. Air Force, and part of the U.S. National Guard. Because both state and federal ANGs go relatively hand-in-hand, they are both usually referred to collectively.

Air National Guardsmen who become members of the Active Guard and Reserve (AGR) receive full active duty pay and benefits just like active duty members of any branch of the armed forces.

U.S. ANG units or members may be called up for federal active duty in times of Congressionally sanctioned war or national emergency. The President may also call up members and units of the Air National Guard using a process called "federalization", with the consent of state governors or equivalents, to repel invasion, suppress rebellion, or execute federal laws if the U.S. or any of its states or territories are invaded or is in danger of invasion by a foreign nation, or if there is a rebellion or danger of a rebellion against the authority of the federal government, or if the president is unable to execute the laws of the U.S. with the regular armed forces.

Many ANG pilots work for commercial airlines, but in the ANG they may train to fly any of the aircraft in the USAF inventory, with the current exception of the Rockwell B-1B Lancer and B-52 Stratofortress bombers, the C-5 Galaxy, E-3 Sentry AWACS aircraft, and the AC-130 Gunship. The Georgia Air National Guard and the Kansas Air National Guard previously flew the Rockwell B-1B Lancer prior to converting to the E-8 Joint STARS and KC-135R Stratotanker, respectively. In addition, the 131st Fighter Wing of the Missouri Air National Guard transitioned from flying the F-15C/D Eagle at St. Louis International Airport/Lambert Field Air National Guard Station to the B-2 Spirit at Whiteman Air Force Base as an "Associate" unit of the Regular Air Force's 509th Bomb Wing and was re-designated as the 131st Bomb Wing.

In 2012, General Norton A. Schwartz, the then-Chief of Staff of the Air Force, defended cutting nearly twice as many service members from the Air National Guard and the AFRC as from the active duty Regular Air Force in order to maintain the service's surge and rotational capabilities in the Active Component. These proposals were eventually overruled and cancelled by the U.S. Congress.

Air National Guard operations are arranged according to U.S. state structure, so that each of the fifty states and Washington, D.C. host at least one wing. Guam, Puerto Rico and The US Virgin Islands each support a wing or support squadron. Some larger states such as California, Ohio, New York, and Texas host as many as five wings as well as smaller geographically separated units (GSUs). Air National Guard wings are either assigned aircraft or, in some cases, operate as "non-flying" wings. Examples of non-flying wings include regional support wings and intelligence wings.

For the most part, the ANG "own" their own equipment, but in some cases, aircraft and mission support operations are shared with active-duty Air Force or the Air Force Reserve. ANG stations may be located on or next to active-duty Air Force bases, Air Reserve bases, civilian airports, Naval Air stations, Army installations, or stand-alone Air National Guard stations.

The majority of ANG wings fall under either ACC or AMC MAJCOMS. Some exceptions include the Alaska, Hawaii, and Guam wings, whose CAF and MAF units are operationally gained by Pacific Air Forces, and wings associated with U.S. Space Force, Air Education and Training Command, Air Force Global Strike Command, and Air Force Special Operations Command, and U.S. Air Forces in Europe – Air Forces Africa.

In September 2019, the U.S. Air National Guard had about 107,100 men and women in service. Like the Air Force Reserve Command (AFRC), most ANG members serve part-time at least one weekend a month and an additional two weeks a year (e.g., 38 days). The demands of maintaining aircraft mean that some AFRC and ANG members work full-time, either as full-time Air Reserve Technicians (ART) or Active Guard and Reserve (AGR) personnel. Even traditional part-time air guardsmen, especially pilots, navigators/combat systems officers, air battle managers and enlisted aircrew, often serve 100 or more man-days annually. The Air National Guard and the Air Force Reserve Command (AFRC) comprise the "Air Reserve Component" of the U.S. Air Force under the "Total Force" construct.

=== Squadrons ===
==== Flying Squadrons ====
Squadron	Shield	Location	MAJCOM	Aircraft
100th Fighter Squadron		Montgomery Air National Guard Base, Alabama	ACC	F-35A
101st Intelligence Squadron		Otis Air National Guard Base, Massachusetts	ACC	DCGS / Flying mission terminated due to BRAC; former F-15C/D fighter squadron.
101st Rescue Squadron		Francis S. Gabreski Air National Guard Base, New York	ACC	HH-60W
102nd Rescue Squadron		Francis S. Gabreski Air National Guard Base, New York	ACC	HC-130J
103rd Rescue Squadron		Francis S. Gabreski Air National Guard Base, New York	ACC	Aircrew personnel, but no assigned aircraft. Combat Rescue Officer (CRO) and enlisted Pararescueman (PJ) squadron; utilizes HH-60W aircraft of the 101 RQS and HC-130J aircraft of the 102 RQS.
103rd Attack Squadron		Naval Air Station Joint Reserve Base Willow Grove, Pennsylvania	ACC	MQ-9A
104th Fighter Squadron		Martin State Airport / Warfield Air National Guard Base, Maryland	ACC	A-10C; slated to transition to a cyber mission.
105th Airlift Squadron		Nashville International Airport / Berry Field Air National Guard Base, Tennessee	AMC	MQ-9A / Manned flying mission terminated due to BRAC with squadron redesignation pending; former C-130H airlift squadron.
106th Air Refueling Squadron		Sumpter Smith Air National Guard Base, Alabama	AMC	KC-135R
107th Fighter Squadron		Selfridge Air National Guard Base, Michigan	ACC	A-10C; slated for transition to the F-15EX.
108th Air Refueling Squadron		Scott Air Force Base, Illinois	AMC	KC-135R
109th Airlift Squadron		Minneapolis-St. Paul Air Reserve Station, Minnesota	AMC	C-130H; slated for transition to the C-130J.
110th Bomb Squadron		Whiteman Air Force Base, Missouri	AFGSC	B-2A
111th Attack Squadron		Ellington Field Joint Reserve Base, Texas	ACC	MQ-9A
112th Fighter Squadron		Toledo Air National Guard Base, Ohio	ACC	F-16C/D
113th Air Support Operations Squadron		Hulman Field Air National Guard Base, Indiana	ACC	ASOS and DCGS / Flying mission terminnated due to BRAC; former F-16C/D fighter squadron.
114th Fighter Squadron		Kingsley Field Air National Guard Base, Oregon	ACC	F-15C/D; slated for transition to the F-35A
115th Airlift Squadron		Channel Islands Air National Guard Station, California	AMC	C-130J-30
116th Air Refueling Squadron		Fairchild Air Force Base, Washington	AMC	KC-135R
117th Air Refueling Squadron		Forbes Field Air National Guard Base, Kansas	AMC	KC-135R
118th Airlift Squadron		Bradley Air National Guard Base, Connecticut	AMC	C-130H; slated for transition to the C-130J.
119th Fighter Squadron		Atlantic City Air National Guard Base, New Jersey	ACC	F-16C/D
120th Fighter Squadron		Buckley Space Force Base, Colorado	ACC	F-16C/D
121st Fighter Squadron		Joint Base Andrews, Maryland	ACC	F-16C/D
122nd Fighter Squadron		Naval Air Station Joint Reserve Base New Orleans, Louisiana	ACC	F-15C/D; slated for transition to the F-15EX.
123rd Fighter Squadron		Portland Air National Guard Base, Oregon	ACC	F-15C/D & F-15EX
124th Attack Squadron		Des Moines International Airport, Iowa	ACC	MQ-9A / Manned flying mission terminated due to Base Realignment and Closure; former F-16C/D fighter squadron.
125th Fighter Squadron		Tulsa Air National Guard Base, Oklahoma	ACC	F-16C/D
126th Air Refueling Squadron		General Mitchell Air National Guard Base, Wisconsin	AMC	KC-135R
127th Command and Control Squadron		McConnell Air Force Base, Kansas	ACC	Inactive
128th Airborne Command and Control Squadron		Robins Air Force Base, Georgia	ACC	Former E-8C squadron
129th Rescue Squadron		Moffett Federal Airfield, California	ACC	HH-60W
130th Airlift Squadron		Yeager Airport / McLaughlin Air National Guard Base, West Virginia	AMC	C-130J-30
130th Rescue Squadron		Moffett Federal Airfield, California	ACC	HC-130J
131st Fighter Squadron		Barnes Air National Guard Base, Massachusetts	ACC	F-15C/D; slated to transition to F-35A.
131st Rescue Squadron		Moffett Federal Airfield, California	ACC	Aircrew personnel, but no assigned aircraft. Combat Rescue Officer (CRO) and enlisted Pararescueman (PJ) squadron; utilizes HH-60G & HH-60W aircraft of the 129 RQS and HC-130J aircraft of the 130 RQS.
132nd Air Refueling Squadron		Bangor Air National Guard Base, Maine	AMC	KC-135R
133rd Air Refueling Squadron		Pease Air National Guard Base, New Hampshire	AMC	KC-46A
134th Fighter Squadron		Burlington Air National Guard Base, Vermont	ACC	F-35A
135th Intelligence Squadron		Martin State Airport / Warfield Air National Guard Base, Maryland	AMC	DCGS / Flying mission terminated due to BRAC; former C-130J airlift squadron.
136th Air Squadron		Niagara Falls Joint Air Reserve Station, New York	ACC	MQ-9A / Manned flying mission terminated effective Dec 2015 due to USAF budget reductions imposed by sequestration; former C-130H "associate" airlift squadron to Air Force Reserve Command's 914th Airlift Wing.
137th Airlift Squadron		Stewart Air National Guard Base, New York	AMC	C-17A
138th Attack Squadron		Syracuse Hancock International Airport / Hancock Field Air National Guard Base, New York	ACC	MQ-9A / Manned flying mission terminated due to BRAC; former F-16C/D fighter squadron.
139th Airlift Squadron		Schenectady County Airport / Stratton Air National Guard Base, New York	AMC	LC-130H, C-130H
141st Air Refueling Squadron		Joint Base McGuire-Dix-Lakehurst, New Jersey	AMC	KC-46A, associate unit of the 305th AMW.
142nd Airlift Squadron		New Castle Air National Guard Base, Delaware	AMC	C-130H
143rd Airlift Squadron		Quonset Air National Guard Base, Rhode Island	AMC	C-130J-30
144th Airlift Squadron		Joint Base Elmendorf–Richardson, Alaska	PACAF	C-17A
145th Air Refueling Squadron		Rickenbacker Air National Guard Base, Ohio	AMC	KC-135R
146th Air Refueling Squadron		Pittsburgh Air Reserve Station, Pennsylvania	AMC	KC-135T
147th Air Refueling Squadron		Pittsburgh Air Reserve Station, Pennsylvania	AMC	KC-135T
148th Fighter Squadron		Tucson Air National Guard Base, Arizona	AETC	F-16A/AM/B/BM/C/D/E/F / NATO/Allied/Coalition F-16 training in support of F-16 Foreign Military Sales (FMS) programs.
149th Fighter Squadron		Langley Air Force Base, Virginia	ACC	F-22A
150th Special Operations Squadron		Joint Base McGuire-Dix-Lakehurst, New Jersey	AFSOC	C-32B
151st Air Refueling Squadron		McGhee Tyson Air National Guard Base, Tennessee	AMC	KC-135R; slated for transition to the KC-46A
152nd Fighter Squadron		Tucson Air National Guard Base, Arizona	AETC	F-16C/D / NATO/Allied/Coalition F-16 training in support of F-16 Foreign Military Sales (FMS) programs.
153rd Air Refueling Squadron		Key Field Air National Guard Base, Mississippi	AMC	KC-135R
154th Training Squadron		Little Rock Air Force Base, Arkansas	AETC	C-130H & C-130J
155th Airlift Squadron		Memphis Air National Guard Base, Tennessee	AMC	C-17A
156th Airlift Squadron		Charlotte Air National Guard Base, North Carolina	AMC	C-17A
157th Fighter Squadron		McEntire Joint National Guard Base, South Carolina	ACC	F-16CM/DM
158th Airlift Squadron		Savannah Air National Guard Base, Georgia	AMC	C-130J-30
159th Fighter Squadron		Jacksonville Air National Guard Base, Florida	ACC	F-35A.
160th Fighter Squadron		Montgomery Air National Guard Base, Alabama	ACC	Inactive; redesignated as the 100th Fighter Squadron.
161st Intelligence Squadron		McConnell Air Force Base, Kansas	ACC	DCGS (flying mission terminated due to BRAC; former F-16C/D fighter squadron)
162nd Attack Squadron		Springfield Air National Guard Base, Ohio	ACC	MQ-9A
163rd Fighter Squadron		Fort Wayne Air National Guard Base, Indiana	ACC	F-16C/D
164th Airlift Squadron		Mansfield Lahm Air National Guard Base, Ohio	AMC	C-130H
165th Airlift Squadron		Louisville Air National Guard Base, Kentucky	AMC	C-130J-30
166th Air Refueling Squadron		Rickenbacker Air National Guard Base, Ohio	AMC	KC-135R
167th Airlift Squadron		Shepherd Field Air National Guard Base, West Virginia	AMC	C-17A
168th Air Refueling Squadron		Eielson Air Force Base, Alaska	PACAF	KC-135R
169th Airlift Squadron		Peoria Air National Guard Base, Illinois	AMC	C-130H; slated for transition to the C-130J.
170th Air Refueling Squadron		Joint Base McGuire-Dix-Lakehurst, New Jersey	AMC	KC-46A, associate unit of the 305th AMW.
170th Fighter Squadron		Capital Airport Air National Guard Station, Illinois	ACC	Inactive / Flying mission terminated due to BRAC; former F-16C/D fighter squadron.
171st Air Refueling Squadron		Selfridge Air National Guard Base, Michigan	AMC	KC-135T; slated for transition to the KC-46A.
172d Attack Squadron		Battle Creek Air National Guard Base, Michigan	ACC	MQ-9A / Fighter/attack flying mission terminated in 2009 due to BRAC and transferred to 107th Fighter Squadron; former A-10A fighter squadron. Manned flying mission terminated in 2013 due to USAF budget reductions imposed by sequestration; former C-21A airlift squadron.
173rd Air Refueling Squadron		Lincoln Air National Guard Base, Nebraska	AMC	KC-135R
174th Air Refueling Squadron		Sioux City Air National Guard Base, Iowa	AMC	KC-135R
175th Fighter Squadron		Sioux Falls Regional Airport / Joe Foss Field Air National Guard Station, South Dakota	ACC	F-16C/D
176th Fighter Squadron		Dane County Regional Airport / Truax Field Air National Guard Base, Wisconsin	ACC	F-35A
177th Information Warfare Aggressor Squadron		McConnell Air Force Base, Kansas	ACC	Non-flying information warfare squadron / Flying mission terminated due to BRAC; former F-16C/D fighter squadron.
178th Attack Squadron		Hector International Airport / Fargo Air National Guard Base, North Dakota	ACC	MQ-9A
179th Fighter Squadron		Duluth Air National Guard Base, Minnesota	ACC	F-16C/D
180th Airlift Squadron		Rosecrans Air National Guard Base, Missouri	AMC	C-130H
181st Airlift Squadron		Naval Air Station Joint Reserve Base Fort Worth, Texas	AMC	C-130J-30
182nd Fighter Squadron		Lackland Air Force Base / Kelly Field Annex, Texas	AETC	F-16C/D
183rd Airlift Squadron		Allen C. Thompson Field Air National Guard Base, Mississippi	AMC	C-17A
184th Attack Squadron		Fort Smith Regional Airport / Ebbing Air National Guard Base, Arkansas	ACC	MQ-9A / Prior manned flying mission (1st iteration) terminated in 2007 due to BRAC; former F-16C/D fighter squadron; latest manned flying mission (2nd iteration) terminated in 2014 pursuant to 2013 NDAA; former A-10C fighter squadron; Loss of A-10s part of a since discontinued USAF effort to retire all A-10 aircraft from USAF, AFRC and ANG inventories and shift funding to the F-35A due to sequestration-imposed pressures on USAF budget.
185th Special Operations Squadron		Tinker Air Force Base, Oklahoma	AFSOC	MC-12W & OA-1K
186th Airlift Squadron		Great Falls Air National Guard Base, Montana	AMC	C-130H; slated for transition to the C-130J.
187th Airlift Squadron		Cheyenne Regional Airport / Cheyenne Air National Guard Base, Wyoming	AMC	C-130H; slated for transition to the C-130J.
188th Rescue Squadron		Kirtland Air Force Base, New Mexico	AETC	HC-130J, HH-60G, CV-22B
189th Airlift Squadron		Boise Airport / Gowen Field Air National Guard Base, Idaho	AMC	Inactive / Flying mission terminated due to BRAC; former C-130H airlift squadron
190th Fighter Squadron		Boise Airport / Gowen Field Air National Guard Base, Idaho	ACC	A-10C; slated for transition to the F-16C/D.
191st Air Refueling Squadron		Salt Lake City International Airport / Salt Lake City Air National Guard Base, Utah	AMC	KC-135R
192nd Airlift Squadron		Reno Air National Guard Base, Nevada	AMC	C-130H
193rd Special Operations Squadron		Harrisburg Air National Guard Base, Pennsylvania	AFSOC	MC-130J
194th Fighter Squadron		Fresno Air National Guard Base, California	ACC	F-15C/D; slated for transition to the F-15EX.
195th Fighter Squadron		Tucson Air National Guard Base, Arizona	AETC	F-16C/D
196th Attack Squadron		March Air Reserve Base, California	ACC	MQ-9A
197th Air Refueling Squadron		Goldwater Air National Guard Base, Arizona	AMC	KC-135R
198th Airlift Squadron		Muñiz Air National Guard Base, Puerto Rico	AMC	Inactive
199th Fighter Squadron		Joint Base Pearl Harbor–Hickam, Hawaii	PACAF	F-22A
200th Airlift Squadron		Buckley Space Force Base, Colorado	AMC	Inactive. Formerly operated the C-21A
201st Airlift Squadron		Joint Base Andrews, Maryland	AMC	C-40C
203rd Air Refueling Squadron		Joint Base Pearl Harbor–Hickam, Hawaii	PACAF	KC-135R
204th Airlift Squadron		Joint Base Pearl Harbor–Hickam, Hawaii	PACAF	C-17A
210th Rescue Squadron		Joint Base Elmendorf–Richardson, Alaska	PACAF	HH-60G
211th Rescue Squadron		Joint Base Elmendorf–Richardson, Alaska	PACAF	HC-130J
212th Rescue Squadron		Joint Base Elmendorf–Richardson, Alaska	PACAF	Aircrew personnel, but no assigned aircraft. / Combat Rescue Officer (CRO) and enlisted Pararescueman (PJ) squadron; utilizes HH-60G aircraft of the 210 RQS and HC-130J aircraft of the 211 RQS.
214th Attack Squadron		Davis–Monthan Air Force Base, Arizona	ACC	MQ-9A
249th Airlift Squadron		Joint Base Elmendorf–Richardson, Alaska		Inactive

== Chain of command ==
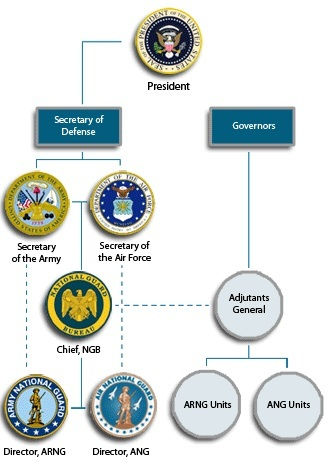
National Guard Bureau organizational chart depicting command and reporting relationships

As state militia units, the units in the Air National Guard are not in the normal U.S. Air Force chain of command. They are under the jurisdiction of the United States National Guard Bureau unless they are federalized by order of the President of the United States.

The Air National Guard Readiness Center, a field operating center of the U.S. Air Force at Joint Base Andrews, Maryland, performs operational and technical functions to ensure combat readiness of ANG units and is a channel of communication between the Air Force and the National Guard Bureau regarding readiness and operations.

Air National Guard units are trained and equipped by the U.S. Air Force. The state (or equivalent) ANG units, depending on their mission, are operationally gained by a major command of the USAF if federalized. In addition, personnel and equipment are routinely federalized and deployed by the USAF as part of Air Expeditionary Forces.

== Personnel and culture ==
ANG enlisted members complete Basic Military Training at Joint Base San Antonio. Air National Guard personnel are expected to adhere to the same moral and physical standards as their "full-time" active duty Air Force and "part-time" Air Force Reserve federal counterparts.

=== Awards and decorations ===
All Air National Guardsmen are eligible to receive all U.S. military awards. The ANG also bestows a number of state awards for local services rendered in a service member's home state or equivalent.

Medal of Honor	Air Force Cross	Distinguished Service Medal	Silver Star Medal	Legion of Merit	Distinguished Flying Cross	Airman's Medal	Bronze Star Medal	Purple Heart	Meritorious Service Medal	Air Medal	Aerial Achievement Medal	Air and Space Commendation Medal	Air and Space Achievement Medal

=== Unit awards ===
Presidential Unit Citation	Gallant Unit Citation	Meritorious Unit Award	Air and Space Outstanding Unit Award	Air and Space Organizational Excellence Award

=== Campaign, expeditionary, and service awards ===
Combat Action Medal	Combat Readiness Medal	Air Force Good Conduct Medal	Air and Space Recognition Ribbon	Remote Combat Effects Campaign Medal	Air and Space Campaign Medal	Nuclear Deterrence Operations Service Medal	Air and Space Overseas Service Ribbon (Short Tour)	Air and Space Overseas Service Ribbon (Long Tour)	Air and Space Expeditionary Service Ribbon	Air and Space Longevity Service Award	Developmental Special Duty Ribbon	Air Force Enlisted Professional Military Education Graduate Ribbon	Basic Military Training Honor Graduate Ribbon	Small Arms Expert Marksmanship Ribbon	Air and Space Training Ribbon

== Air National Guard units (headquarters, wing and group level) ==
=== National ===
- Air National Guard Readiness Center, Joint Base Andrews, Maryland
- Air National Guard Air Force Reserve Command Test Center, Tucson ANGB, Arizona
- Air National Guard Weather Readiness Training Center, Camp Blanding, Florida
- I.G. Brown Air National Guard Training and Education Center, McGhee Tyson ANGB, Knoxville, Tennessee

=== States, federal district, and territories ===
- Alabama Air National Guard

117th Air Refueling Wing, Birmingham ANGB
187th Fighter Wing, Montgomery ANGB/Dannelly Field
226th Combat Communications Group, Abston ANGS, Montgomery

- Alaska Air National Guard

168th Wing, Eielson AFB
176th Wing, Joint Base Elmendorf-Richardson (aka Elmendorf AFB)

176th Wing Rescue Alert Detachment, Eielson AFB

- Arizona Air National Guard

161st Air Refueling Wing, Barry M. Goldwater ANGB
162nd Wing, Tucson ANGB

162nd Fighter Wing Aerospace Control Alert Detachment, Davis-Monthan AFB

214th Attack Group, Davis-Monthan AFB

- Arkansas Air National Guard

188th Wing, Ebbing ANGB
189th Airlift Wing, Little Rock AFB

- California Air National Guard

129th Rescue Wing, Moffett Federal Airfield (former NAS Moffett Field)
144th Fighter Wing, Fresno Air National Guard Base

144th Fighter Wing Alert Detachment, March ARB (former March AFB)

146th Airlift Wing, NAS Point Mugu/Channel Islands ANGS
162nd Combat Communications Group, North Highlands ANGS
163rd Attack Wing, March ARB
195th Wing, Beale AFB

- Colorado Air National Guard

140th Wing, Buckley Space Force Base
233rd Space Group, Greeley Air National Guard Station, Greeley

- Connecticut Air National Guard

103rd Airlift Wing, Bradley ANGB

- Delaware Air National Guard

166th Airlift Wing, New Castle ANGB

- District of Columbia Air National Guard

113th Wing, Joint Base Andrews (aka Andrews AFB), Maryland

- Florida Air National Guard

Headquarters, St. Francis Barracks, St. Augustine
125th Fighter Wing, Jacksonville ANGB

125th Fighter Wing, Detachment 1, Homestead ARB (former Homestead AFB)

Camp Blanding Joint Training Center, Starke

- Georgia Air National Guard

116th Air Control Wing, Robins AFB
165th Airlift Wing, Savannah/Hilton Head International Airport
Georgia ANG Combat Readiness Training Center, Savannah/Hilton Head IAP

- Guam Air National Guard

254th Air Base Group, Andersen AFB, Joint Region Marianas

- Hawaii Air National Guard

154th Wing, Hickam AFB

- Idaho Air National Guard

124th Fighter Wing, Gowen Field ANGB

- Illinois Air National Guard

126th Air Refueling Wing, Scott AFB
182nd Airlift Wing, Peoria ANGB
183rd Fighter Wing, Capital Airport ANGS

- Indiana Air National Guard

122nd Fighter Wing, Fort Wayne ANGB
181st Intelligence Wing, Terre Haute ANGB

- Iowa Air National Guard

132nd Fighter Wing, Des Moines ANGB
185th Air Refueling Wing, Sioux City ANGB

- Kansas Air National Guard

184th Intelligence Wing, McConnell AFB
190th Air Refueling Wing, Forbes Field ANGB (former Forbes AFB)

- Kentucky Air National Guard

123rd Airlift Wing, Louisville ANGB/Standiford Field

- Louisiana Air National Guard

159th Fighter Wing, NAS JRB New Orleans

- Maine Air National Guard

101st Air Refueling Wing, Bangor ANGB (former Dow AFB)

- Maryland Air National Guard

175th Wing, Martin State Airport/Warfield ANGB

- Massachusetts Air National Guard

102nd Intelligence Wing, Otis ANGB (former Otis AFB)
104th Fighter Wing, Barnes ANGB
253rd Cyberspace Engineering Installation Group, Otis ANGB

- Michigan Air National Guard

127th Wing, Selfridge ANGB (former Selfridge AFB)
110th Attack Wing, Battle Creek ANGB
Alpena Combat Readiness Training Center, Alpena

- Minnesota Air National Guard

133rd Airlift Wing, Minneapolis-St. Paul ARS
148th Fighter Wing, Duluth ANGB

- Mississippi Air National Guard

172nd Airlift Wing, Jackson ANGB
186th Air Refueling Wing, Key Field ANGB
Gulfport Combat Readiness Training Center, Gulfport–Biloxi International Airport

- Missouri Air National Guard

131st Bomb Wing, Whiteman Air Force Base
139th Airlift Wing, Rosecrans ANGB

- Montana Air National Guard

120th Airlift Wing, Great Falls ANGB

- Nebraska Air National Guard

155th Air Refueling Wing, Lincoln ANGB (former Lincoln AFB)

- Nevada Air National Guard

152nd Airlift Wing, Reno ANGB

- New Hampshire Air National Guard

157th Air Refueling Wing, Pease ANGB (former Pease AFB)

- New Jersey Air National Guard

108th Wing, McGuire AFB
177th Fighter Wing, Atlantic City ANGB

- New Mexico Air National Guard

150th Special Operations Wing, Kirtland AFB

- New York Air National Guard

105th Airlift Wing, Stewart ANGB (former Stewart AFB)
106th Rescue Wing, Francis S. Gabreski ANGB (former Suffolk County AFB)
107th Attack Wing, Niagara Falls ARS
109th Airlift Wing, Stratton ANGB
174th Attack Wing, Syracuse/Hancock Field ANGB
Eastern Air Defense Sector, Rome

- North Carolina Air National Guard

145th Airlift Wing, Charlotte ANGB

- North Dakota Air National Guard

119th Wing, Fargo ANGB

- Ohio Air National Guard

121st Air Refueling Wing, Rickenbacker ANGB (former Rickenbacker AFB)
178th Wing, Springfield ANGB
179th Airlift Wing, Mansfield Lahm ANGB
180th Fighter Wing, Toledo ANGB
251st Cyberspace Engineering Installation Group, Springfield ANGB
Camp Perry Joint Military Training Center, Port Clinton
Headquarters, Ohio Air National Guard, Columbus

- Oklahoma Air National Guard

137th Air Refueling Wing, Tinker AFB
138th Fighter Wing, Tulsa ANGB

138th Fighter Wing, Detachment 1 (Alert Det), Ellington Field JRB, Texas

- Oregon Air National Guard

142nd Wing, Portland ANGB
173rd Fighter Wing, Kingsley Field ANGB

- Pennsylvania Air National Guard

111th Attack Wing, Biddle ANGB
171st Air Refueling Wing, Pittsburgh IAP ARS
193rd Special Operations Wing, Harrisburg ANGB (former Olmstead AFB)

- Puerto Rico Air National Guard

156th Wing, Muniz ANGB
141st Air Control Squadron, Rafael Hernández Airport (former Ramey AFB)

- Rhode Island Air National Guard

143rd Airlift Wing, Quonset Point ANGS (former NAS Quonset Point)

- South Carolina Air National Guard

169th Fighter Wing, McEntire ANGB

- South Dakota Air National Guard

114th Fighter Wing, Joe Foss Field ANGS

- Tennessee Air National Guard

118th Wing, Berry Field ANGB
134th Air Refueling Wing, McGhee Tyson ANGB (former McGhee Tyson AFB)
164th Airlift Wing, Memphis ANGB

- Texas Air National Guard

136th Airlift Wing, NAS JRB Fort Worth (former Carswell AFB)
147th Attack Wing, Ellington Field JRB (former Ellington AFB)
149th Fighter Wing, Lackland AFB/Kelly Field Annex (former Kelly AFB)
254th Combat Communications Group, Grand Prairie AFRC
Headquarters, Texas Air National Guard, Camp Mabry, Austin

- Utah Air National Guard

151st Air Refueling Wing, Roland R. Wright ANGB

- Vermont Air National Guard

158th Fighter Wing, Burlington ANGB (former Ethan Allen AFB)

- Virgin Islands Air National Guard

285th Civil Engineering Squadron, St. Croix ANGS

- Virginia Air National Guard

192nd Fighter Wing, Langley AFB

- Washington Air National Guard

141st Air Refueling Wing, Fairchild AFB
194th Wing, McChord AFB, Joint Base Lewis-McChord
Western Air Defense Sector, Joint Base Lewis-McChord

- West Virginia Air National Guard

130th Airlift Wing, Charleston ANGB
167th Airlift Wing, Shepherd Field ANGB

- Wisconsin Air National Guard

115th Fighter Wing, Truax Field ANGB
128th Air Refueling Wing, General Mitchell ANGB
Volk Field Combat Readiness Training Center, Volk Field ANGB

- Wyoming Air National Guard

153rd Airlift Wing, Cheyenne ANGB
Camp Guernsey Joint Training Center, Guernsey

== Notable air national guardsman ==
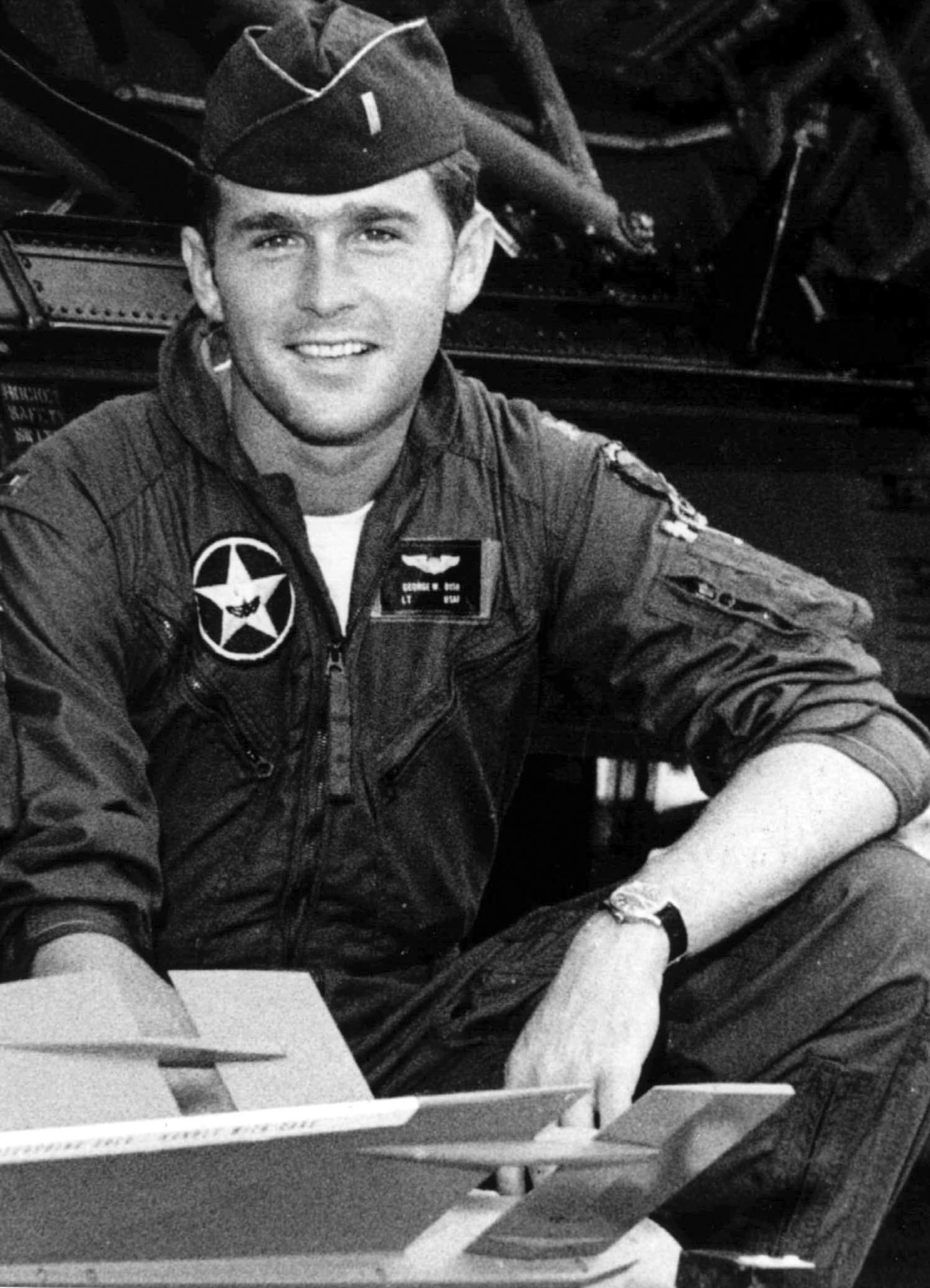
43rd president George W. Bush served in the Air National Guard from 1968-1974.

- 43rd president & 1st LT George W. Bush served in the National Guard in the late 1960s and early 1970s, and he was the first Air National Guard member to attain the presidency.)
- General Dan Caine, 22nd Chairman of the Joint Chiefs of Staff
- Major general Barry Goldwater, United States senator
- Col Lindsey Graham, United States senator
- Col Zach Nunn, United States representative from Iowa
- Lt Col Adam Kinzinger, former United States representative from Illinois
- Captain Ron Paul, former United States representative of Texas

== See also ==
- Space National Guard
- Air National Guard Readiness Center
- I.G. Brown Air National Guard Training and Education Center
- Flying Squadrons of the Air National Guard
- Command Chief Master Sergeant, Air National Guard

=== Comparable organizations ===
- Army National Guard (U.S. Army)
- United States Army Reserve
- United States Marine Corps Reserve
- United States Navy Reserve
- United States Coast Guard Reserve
- Air Force Reserve Command (U.S. Air Force)
