= 100th Fighter Squadron =

United States Air National Guard fighter wing

100th Fighter Squadron

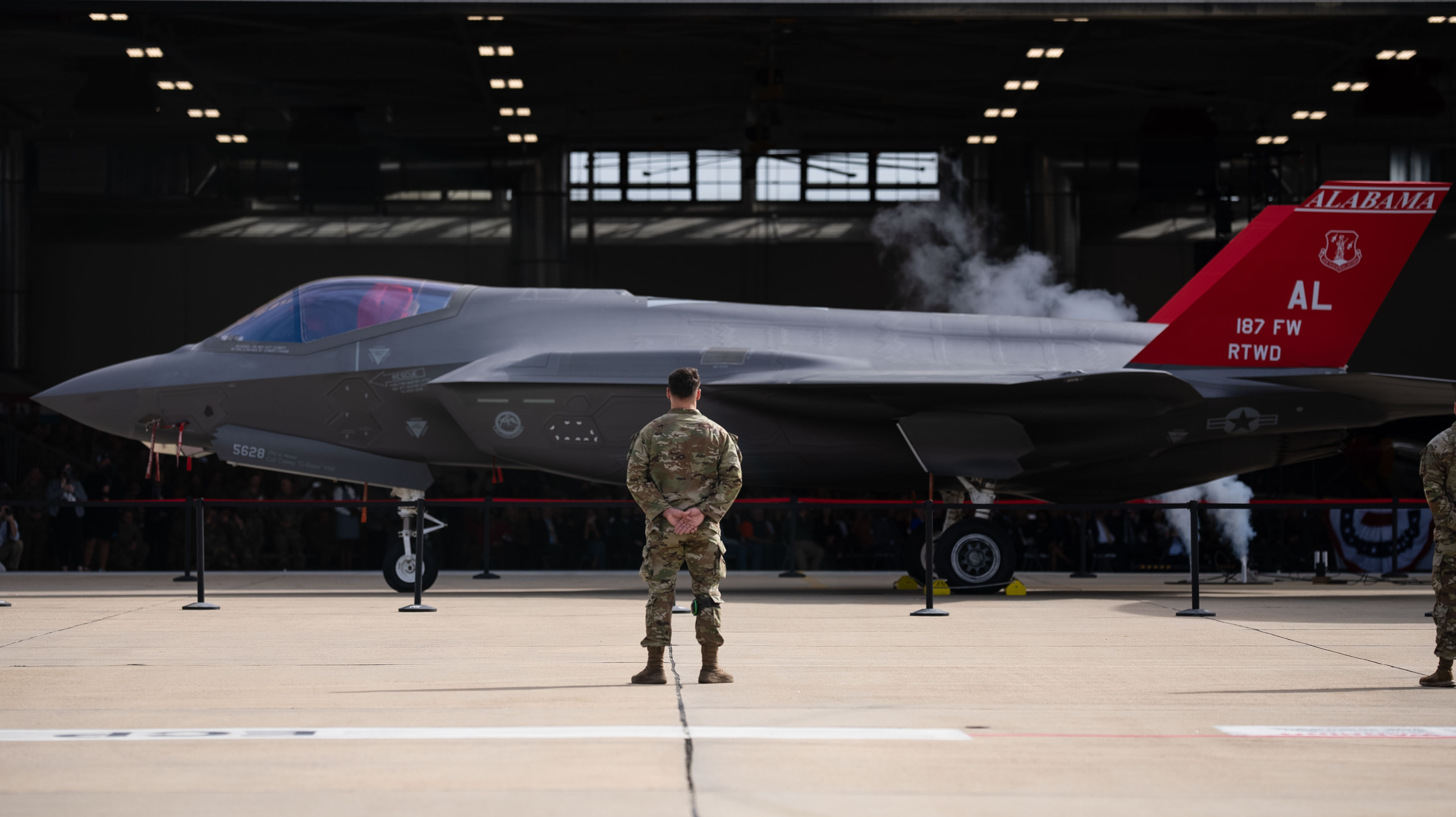
- Squadron F-35A Lightning II during its unveiling ceremony
- Active: 1942–1945; 1947–1949; 1953; 1954–1966; 1989–1993; 1999–2007; 2007–present
- Country: United States
- Allegiance: Alabama
- Branch: Air National Guard
- Type: Squadron
- Role: Fighter
- Part of: Alabama Air National Guard
- Garrison/HQ: Dannelly Field, Alabama
- Nickname: Red Tails
- Mottos: Servemus in Universum (Latin for 'Let Us Serve the World') (100 Air Refueling Squadron); Red Tails... We Deliver
- Engagements: Mediterranean Theater of Operations
- Decorations: Distinguished Unit Citation

Commanders
- Commander: Capt. Jonathan “Blue” Gill

Insignia
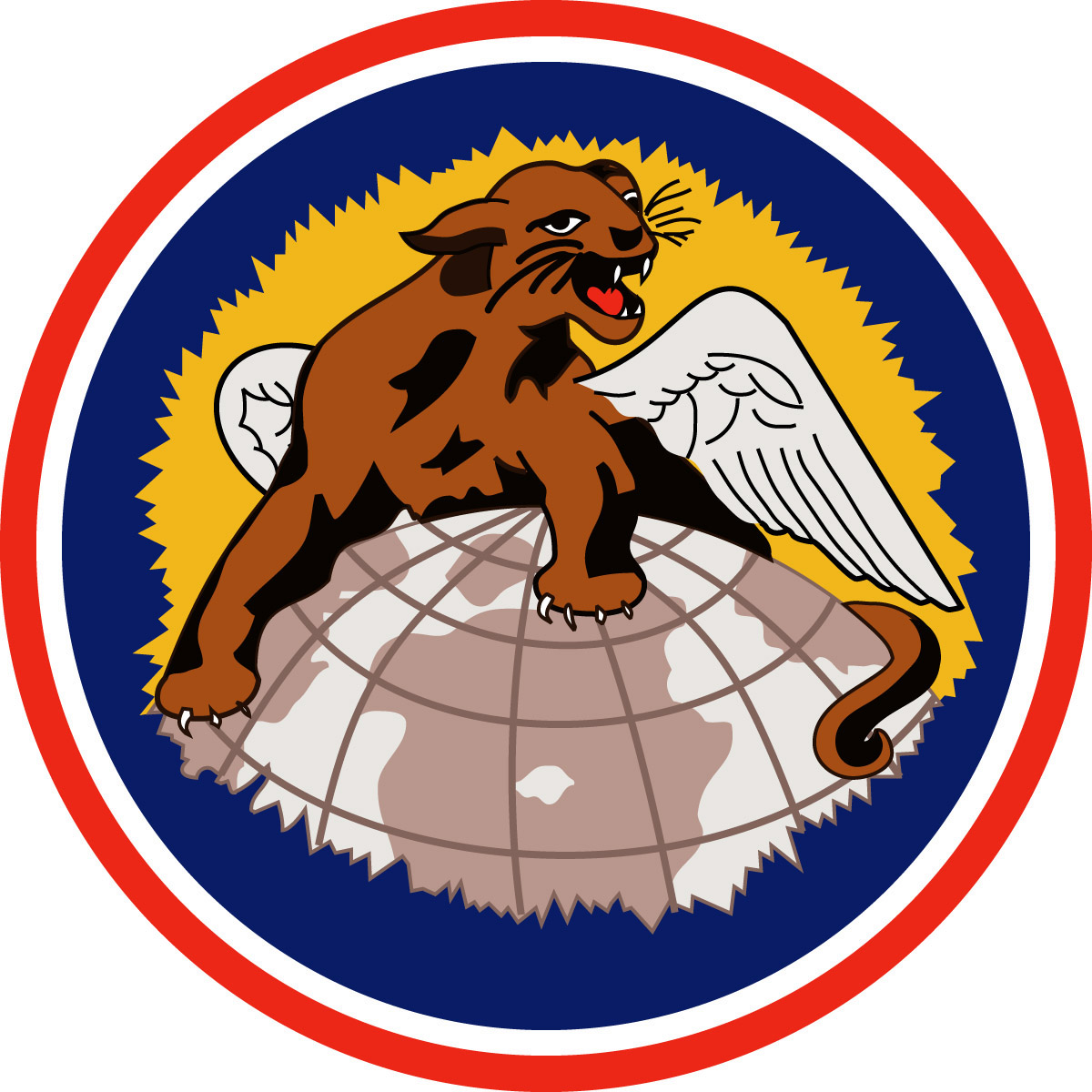
- 100th Fighter Squadron emblem (Note: Approved 25 November 1944. Description: An ultramarine blue disc border red, piped white, circularly pierced with ragged edges, exposing a white globe in base marke[d] with light gray land areas and dark gray lines of latitude and longitude, supporting a crouching, tan and white panther affronte, proper, winged white, in front of a yellow orange background segment.)

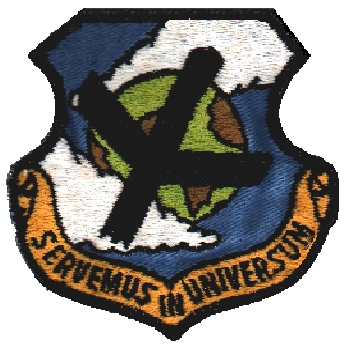
- Patch with 100th Air Refueling Squadron emblem
- Tail code: AL

The 100th Fighter Squadron is a unit of the Alabama Air National Guard 187th Fighter Wing located at Dannelly Field, Alabama. The 100th is equipped with the Lockheed Martin F-35A Lightning II.

The squadron was one of the Tuskegee Airmen squadrons during World War II, one of the famous all-black squadrons of the 332d Fighter Group, activated on 19 February 1942 at Tuskegee Army Air Field, Alabama. It was returned to duty in 2007 as a replacement of the 160th Fighter Squadron so the state could honor the legacy of the Tuskegee Airmen.

== History ==
=== World War II ===
Established in February 1942 at Tuskegee Army Air Field, Alabama to train African-American flight cadets graduated from the Tuskegee Institute Army contract flying school. At Tuskegee, the squadron performed advanced combat flying training. As the number of graduated from the Tuskegee school grew, two additional squadrons the 301st and 302nd Fighter Squadrons were activated at Tuskegee Army Air Field, forming the 332nd Fighter Group.

Due to the segregated status of the Army Air Forces in 1942 and the reluctance by the service to deploy African Americans into combat, the 332nd remained in an extended training status. The Group was transferred to Selfridge Field, near Detroit, Michigan in March 1943 after the decision was reached to deploy the unit. Racial tensions in the Detroit area, however, forced a move to Oscoda Army Air Field, in isolated northeast Michigan the next month where the final training of the unit was performed by First Air Force. However, the unit was delayed again going into combat, and also was sent back to Selfridge upon completion of training at Oscoda to perform Air defense flights over the Detroit area beginning in July 1943.

For six months, the unit remained at Selfridge until pressure on the Army led to the decision to deploy the 100th to the Fifteenth Air Force in Italy at the end of 1943, under the command of Robert B. Tresville, to support the strategic aerial bombardment campaign being carried out by Boeing B-17 Flying Fortress and Consolidated B-24 Liberator Heavy bombers from newly established air bases in the Foggia, Italy area.

As the Italian Campaign pushed further north into Italy during 1944, the squadron moved to operate from forward captured air bases, flying bomber escort missions initially with Republic P-47 Thunderbolts, then being upgraded to the long-range North American P-51D Mustang fighter. In combat, the unit engaged enemy forces in the Rome-Arno area, then during the D-Day landings in France, took part in the Normandy and Northern France campaigns. It returned to the MTO in August 1944, flying combat missions supporting Operation Dragoon, the invasion of southern France, and attacking enemy targets in Northern Italy, Po Valley, the German Rhineland and the Western Allied invasion of Germany during March and April 1945.

With the end of the War in Europe in May 1945, the squadron was returned to Southern Italy, being stationed at Lucera Airfield, near Foggia where the unit slowly was demobilized and personnel returned to the United States. The 100th Fighter Squadron was inactivated at Camp Kilmer, New Jersey in mid-October 1945.

=== Cold War ===
The 332nd was reactivated as part of Tactical Air Command Ninth Air Force at Lockbourne Army Air Base (Later Lockbourne Air Force Base), near Columbus, Ohio in July 1947, again as a segregated African-American unit of the Army Air Forces (later United States Air Force). At Lockbourne, the Wing was equipped with new F-47N Thunderbolts that were designed for very-long range flights in the Pacific Theater to attack ground targets in the Japanese Home Islands. However, the aircraft were never deployed due to the sudden end of the War in August 1945. At Lockbourne, the squadron participated in firepower demonstrations, gunnery training, and operational missions to maintain combat proficiency. The African-American segregated unit was inactivated in July 1949 as a result of President Harry S. Truman's Executive Order 9981. EO 9981 abolished racial discrimination in the United States Armed Forces. The 100th's personnel and equipment were reassigned to other units.

== Air refueling ==
The 100th Air Refueling Squadron was activated by Strategic Air Command (SAC) in 1953, and equipped with Boeing KB-29 Superfortress tankers, based at Robins Air Force Base, near Warner Robins, Georgia. The squadron primarily performed air refueling of SAC's Boeing B-50 Superfortress medium bombers using a primitive "looped hose" refueling system. In 1954, the squadron moved to Pease Air Force Base, New Hampshire; received Boeing KC-97 Stratofreighters and performed air refueling with SAC's Boeing B-47 Stratojet units, deploying frequently to England and Morocco to operate from Operation Reflex bases to refuel SAC bombers prior to their planned flights into Communist-controlled Eastern Europe and the Soviet Union. The 100th Air Refueling Squadron continued to operate from Pease until the end of the B-47 and Reflex era in 1966, at which point the unit was inactivated.

In 1985, the 100th Fighter Squadron and 100th Air Refueling Squadron were consolidated into a single unit. Air Training Command reactivated the consolidated unit 100th as the 100th Flying Training Squadron at Williams Air Force Base, Phoenix, Arizona in September 1989 to demonstrate the feasibility of Air Training Command's plan for five flying training squadrons at each pilot training base. Its instructor pilots provided incoming pilots qualification in Cessna T-37 Tweet and northrop T-38 Talon aircraft, and as instructor pilots. The squadron was inactivated as part of the post-Cold War drawdown of the Air Force in 1993.

The 100th was again reactivated as a flying training squadron at Randolph Air Force Base, Texas, equipped with Beechcraft T-6 Texan II, Raytheon T-1 Jayhawk and Northrop T-38C Talon trainers. It provided flight training to new air force pilot trainees throughout the early 21st century.

=== Alabama Air National Guard ===
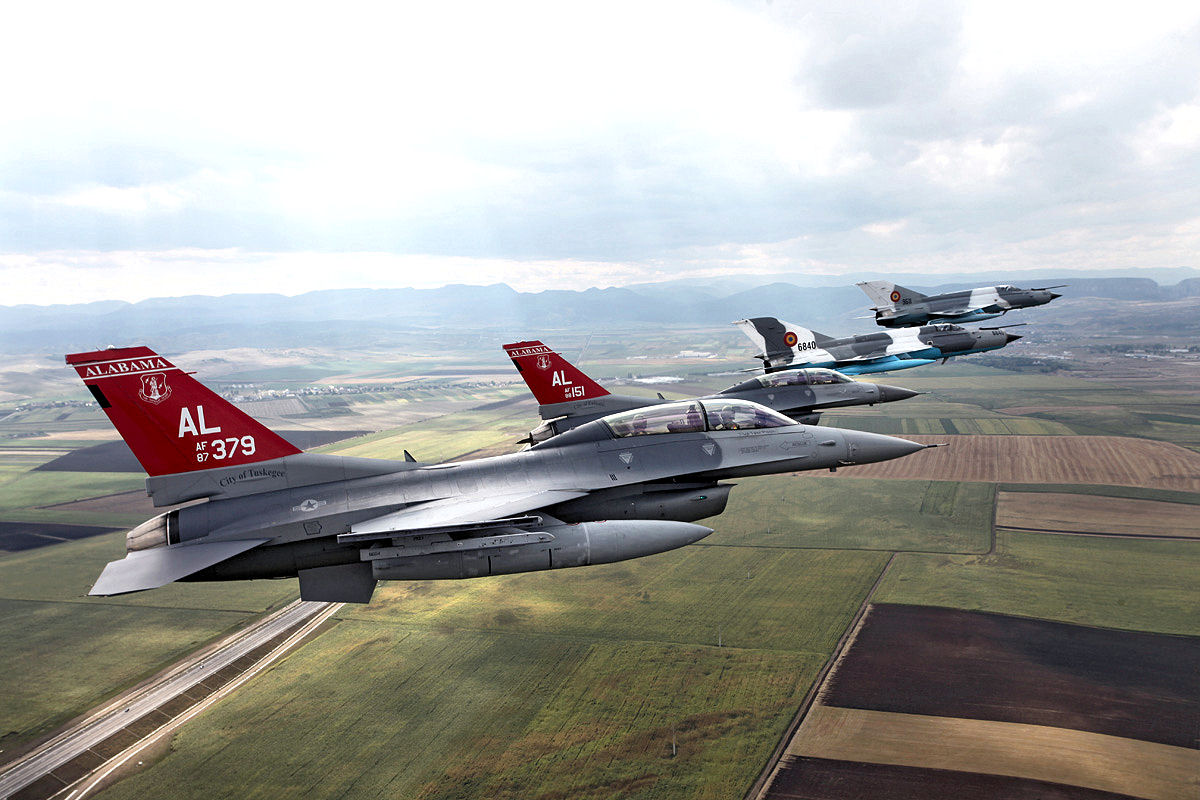
100th Fighter Squadron F-16s flying with Romanian Air Force MiG-21s during Dacian Viper 2012

In 2007, the Alabama legislature requested the National Guard Bureau to allow the Alabama Air National Guard to replace its 160th Fighter Squadron with the 100th Fighter Squadron so the state could honor the legacy of the World War II Tuskegee Airmen. This was obtained from the Air Force and on 12 September 2009, the 100th Flying Training Squadron was inactivated. The designation was transferred to the National Guard Bureau by the Air Force and it was allotted to the Alabama ANG. As a result, the 160th Fighter Squadron was inactivated, and the new 100th Fighter Squadron assumed its personnel, equipment and aircraft. The 160th Fighter Squadron stood down in a ceremony at Montgomery Air National Guard Base, on 13 September 2007, with the 100th Fighter Squadron standing up.

From the onset the squadron started training on the block 30 version of the General Dynamics F-16C/D Fighting Falcon that carried over from the 160th. The squadron flies the F-16 in a traditional air defense and conventional attack role.

In August 2009, the 100th Expeditionary Fighter Squadron deployed 240 airmen and aircraft to Balad Air Base, Iraq as part of the 332nd Expeditionary Fighter Squadron supporting Operation Iraq Freedom. This was the first deployment of the 100th FS to the middle east and over 2,000 hours were flown and Precision Guided Munitions were employed. The unit returned to Montgomery in November 2009.

The squadron deployed to Romania in August 2012 to participate in Dacian Viper 2012, a three-week joint exercise with the Romanian Air Force. The Alabama ANG contingent, which included nearly twenty fighter pilots and eight F-16s, exercised with approximately 200 Romanian soldiers, technical staff, and pilots flying six Mikoyan-Gurevich MiG-21 Lancer fighters at 71st Air Base, located near the town of Câmpia Turzii in the northwestern part of Romania. The squadron returned to Romania in 2015, taking part in combined air operations during the Dacian Viper 2015 exercise.

In December 2017, the Air Force announced that the 100th was one of two Air National Guard squadrons selected for equipping with the Lockheed Martin F-35 Lightning II. The conversion to the fifth-generation jet fighter is scheduled for 2023. On 21 April, the squadron retired its F-16 fighters and will continue its conversion process to the F-35 which arrived in December. Full operational readiness is to be achieved until February 2026. The first three F-35As (18-5414, 18-5420 and 20-5628) were delivered to the 100th FS on 6 December 2023.

== Lineage ==
100th Fighter Squadron

- Constituted as the 100th Pursuit Squadron on 27 December 1941

Activated on 19 February 1942
Redesignated 100th Fighter Squadron on 15 May 1942
Inactivated on 19 October 1945

- Activated on 1 July 1947

Inactivated on 1 July 1949

- Consolidated with the 100th Air Refueling Squadron, Medium as the 100th Air Refueling Squadron on 19 September 1985 (remained inactive)
- Redesignated: 100th Flying Training Squadron on 29 August 1989

Activated on 1 September 1989
Inactivated on 1 April 1993

- Activated on 1 April 1999

Inactivated on 12 September 2007

- Redesignated 100th Fighter Squadron, allotted to the Alabama ANG and extended federal recognition on 13 September 2007

100th Air Refueling Squadron

- Constituted as the 100th Air Refueling Squadron, Medium on 8 January 1953

Activated on 20 January 1953
Inactivated on 25 November 1953
Activated on 8 September 1954
Inactivated on 25 June 1966

- Consolidated with the 100th Fighter Squadron as the 100th Air Refueling Squadron on 19 September 1985 (remained inactive)

=== Assignments ===
- Southeast Air Corps Training Center (later Army Air Forces Southeast Training Center), 19 February 1942
- Third Air Force, 4 July 1942
- 332d Fighter Group, 13 October 1942 – 19 October 1945
- 332nd Fighter Group, 1 July 1947 – 1 July 1949
- 40th Air Division, 20 January 1953
- 801st Air Division, 23 May 1953 (attached to 91st Strategic Reconnaissance Wing after 23 May 1953)
- 40th Air Division, 24–25 November 1953
- Second Air Force, 8 September 1954 (attached to 19th Bombardment Wing after 2 February 1956)
- 100th Bombardment Wing, 16 August 1956 – 25 June 1966
- 82d Flying Training Wing, 1 September 1989
- 82d Operations Group, 15 December 1991 – 1 April 1993
- 340th Flying Training Group, 1 July 1999 – 12 September 2007
- 187th Operations Group, 13 September 2007 – present

=== Stations ===
- Tuskegee Army Air Field, Alabama, 19 February 1942
- Selfridge Field, Michigan, 29 March 1943
- Oscoda Army Air Field, Michigan, 12 April 1943
- Selfridge Field, Michigan, 9 July – 22 December 1943
- Montecorvino Airfield, Italy, 3 February 1944
- Capodichino Airfield, Italy, 15 April 1944
- Ramitelli Airfield, Italy, 28 May 1944
- Cattolica Airfield, Italy, c. 4 May 1945
- Lucera Airfield, Italy, c. 18 July – September 1945
- Camp Kilmer, New Jersey, 17–19 October 1945
- Lockbourne Army Air Base (later Lockbourne Air Force Base), Ohio, 1 July 1947 – 1 July 1949
- Lockbourne Air Force Base, Ohio, 23 May 1953 – 24 November 1953
- Robins Air Force Base, Georgia, 8 September 1954
- Pease Air Force Base, New Hampshire, August 1956 – 25 June 1966
- Williams Air Force Base, Arizona, 1 September 1989 – 1 April 1993
- Randolph Air Force Base, Texas, 1 July 1999 – 12 September 2007
- Dannelly Field, Montgomery, Alabama, 13 September 2007 – present

=== Aircraft ===
- Bell P-39 Airacobra, 1943, 1944
- Curtiss P-40 Warhawk, 1943
- Republic P-47 Thunderbolt, 1944
- North American P-51 Mustang, 1944–1945.
- Republic F-47N Thunderbolt, 1947–1949
- Boeing KB-29P Superfortress, 1953
- Boeing KC-97G Stratotanker, 1954–1966
- Cessna T-37 Tweet, 1989–1993
- Northrop T-38 Talon, 1989–1993, 1999–2007
- Raytheon T-1 Jayhawk, 1999–2007
- Beechcraft T-6 Texan II, 2000–2007
- General Dynamics F-16C Fighting Falcon, 2007–2023
- Lockheed Martin F-35 Lightning II, 2023–present
