= Montgomery Air National Guard Base =

Military airbase in Alabama, US

- Dannelly Field
- Near Montgomery, Alabama in United States of America
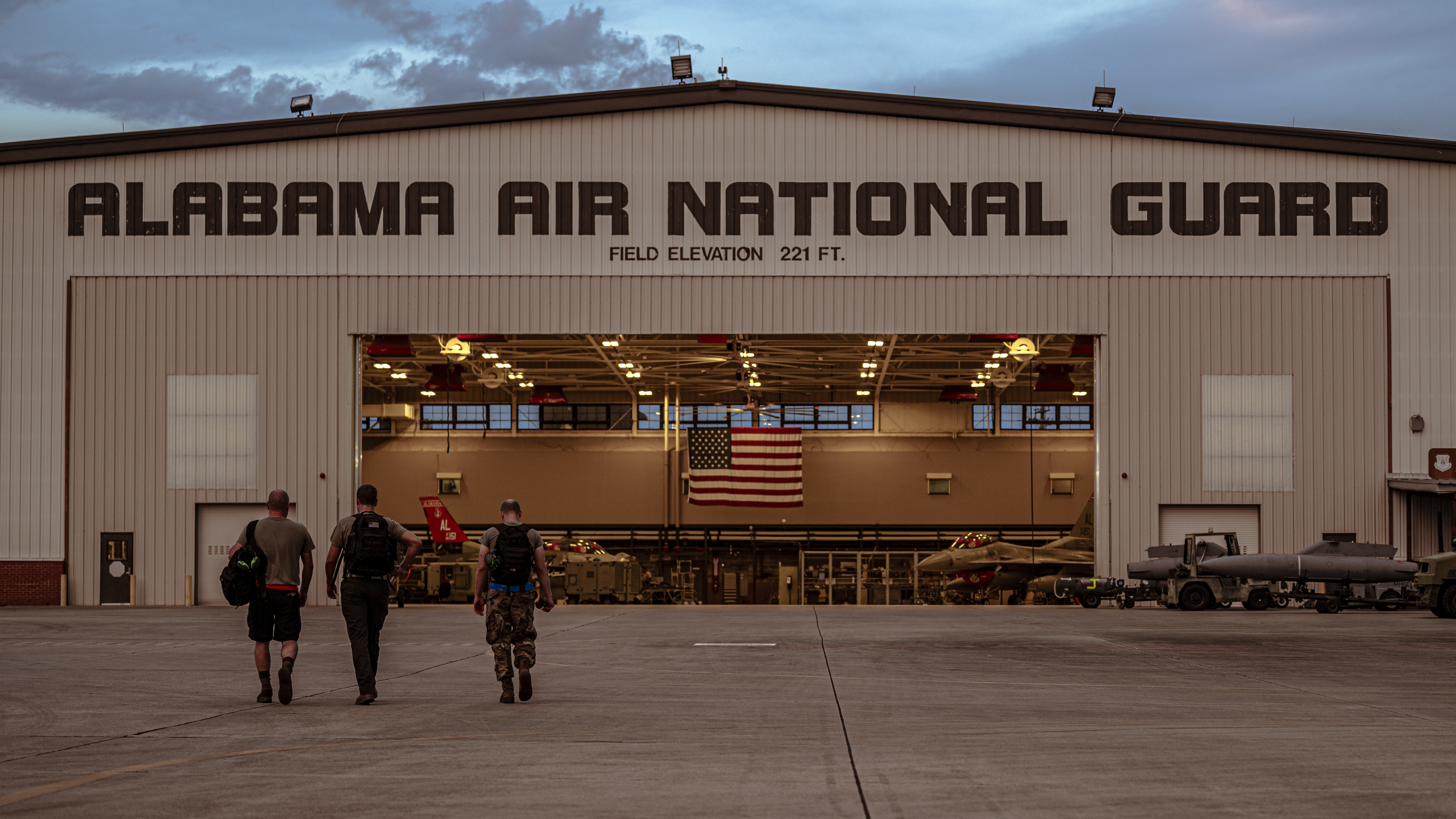
- Alabama Air National Guard hangar at Montgomery Air National Guard Base

Site information
- Type: Air National Guard base
- Owner: City of Montgomery
- Operator: US Air Force (USAF)
- Controlled by: Alabama Air National Guard
- Condition: Operational
- Website: www.187fw.ang.af.mil

Location
- Coordinates: 32°18′02″N 086°23′38″W

Site history
- Built: 1943
- In use: 1943 – present

Garrison information
- Current commander: Colonel Ed Casey
- Garrison: 187th Fighter Wing

Airfield information
- Identifiers: IATA: MGM, ICAO: KMGM, FAA LID: MGM, WMO: 722260
- Elevation: 67.3 metres (221 ft) AMSL
Runways
Direction	Length and surface
10/28	2,749.2 metres (9,020 ft) asphalt
3/21	1,222.5 metres (4,011 ft) asphalt
- Airfield shared with Montgomery Regional Airport; Source: Federal Aviation Administration

Montgomery Air National Guard Base is the home base of the Alabama Air National Guard 187th Fighter Wing.

== History ==
The base has previously been known as Gunter Army Airfield Auxiliary #6 and is still sometimes known as Dannelly Field.

The roots of the 187th Fighter Wing date back to 1952 when the Alabama Air National Guard organized the 160th Tactical Reconnaissance Squadron in Birmingham, Alabama equipped with the RF-51 Mustang. The squadron moved to Dannelly Field on 1 January 1953, and entered the jet age with the arrival of the RF-80 Shooting Star in 1955. Within a year the 160th transitioned to the RF-84 Thunderflash aircraft, which served as the squadron's primary aircraft for the next 15 years.

The squadron was mobilized during the Berlin Crisis in 1961-1962 and deployed to Toul-Rosières Air Base, France. In August 1962, the squadron returned to normal peacetime status and was reorganized. It was then officially designated the 187th Reconnaissance Group.

In 1971, the Thunderflash was replaced by the RF-4C Phantom II, which was flown for 17 years. From 1971 to 1982, the group remained in the reconnaissance role. The 187th won many honors during this timeframe, including the best reconnaissance unit in the nation in the Photo Finish "81" competition.

In 1982, the 187th changed missions from reconnaissance to the multi-purpose fighter role after acquiring the F-4D. The Group established itself as a premier tactical fighter unit by capturing overall top honors in the ANG Fangsmoke competition in 1987. In October 1988, the Group converted to the F-16 aircraft. In October 1995, the Group was designated a Wing under Air Force reorganization; becoming the 187th Fighter Wing.

== Based units ==
Flying and notable non-flying units based at Montgomery Air National Guard Base include the following.

Units marked GSU are Geographically Separate Units, which although based at Montgomery, are subordinate to a parent unit based at another location.

=== United States Air Force ===
Air National Guard

- Alabama Air National Guard
  - 187th Fighter Wing (host wing)
    - 187th Operations Group
      - 100th Fighter Squadron – F-35A Lightning II
    - 187th Maintenance Group
      - Aircraft Maintenance Squadron
    - 187th Medical Group
    - 187th Mission Support Group
      - Mission Support Group
      - Civil Engineering
      - Communications Squadron
      - Force Support Squadron
      - Logistics Readiness Squadron
      - Security Forces Squadron

Air Combat Command

- Ninth Air Force
  - 20th Fighter Wing
    - 495th Fighter Group
      - 377th Fighter Squadron (GSU) – F-35A Lightning II

== Future ==
In April 2020, the Air Force announced that the F-35A Lighting II would be based at Montgomery ANGB, with the 187th Fighter Wing receiving its first aircraft in 2023.
