= 187th Fighter Wing =

187th Fighter Wing

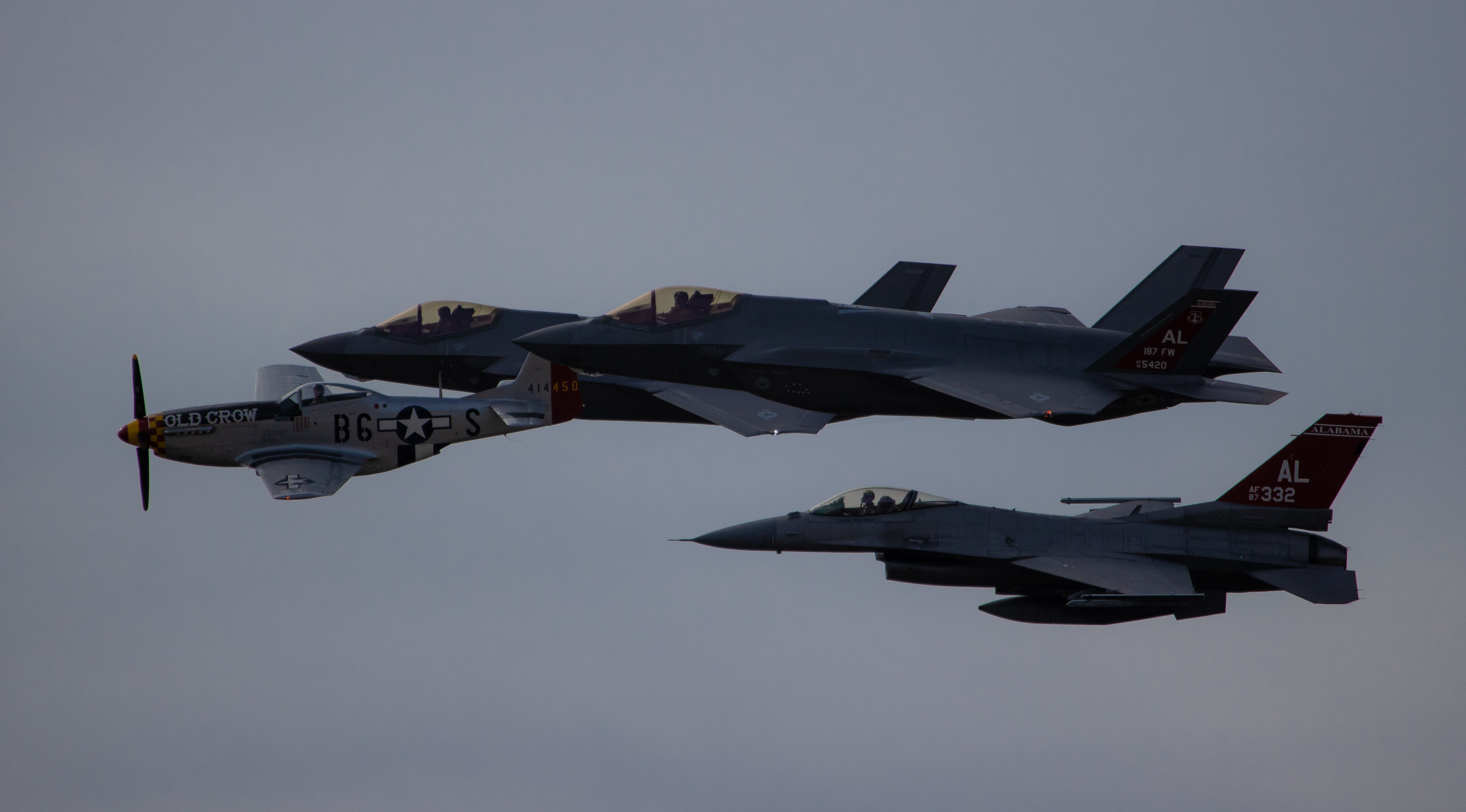
- F-35 Lightning II fighters of 187 FW in formation with an F-16 Fighting Falcon and a P-51 Mustang celebrating the legacy of the Tuskegee Airmen on 9 February 2024
- Active: 1962–present
- Country: United States
- Allegiance: Alabama
- Branch: Air National Guard
- Type: Wing
- Role: Fighter
- Part of: Alabama Air National Guard
- Garrison/HQ: Dannelly Field, Alabama
- Engagements: Berlin Crisis, Operation Iraqi Freedom

Commanders
- Wing Commander: Colonel John D. Caldwell

Insignia
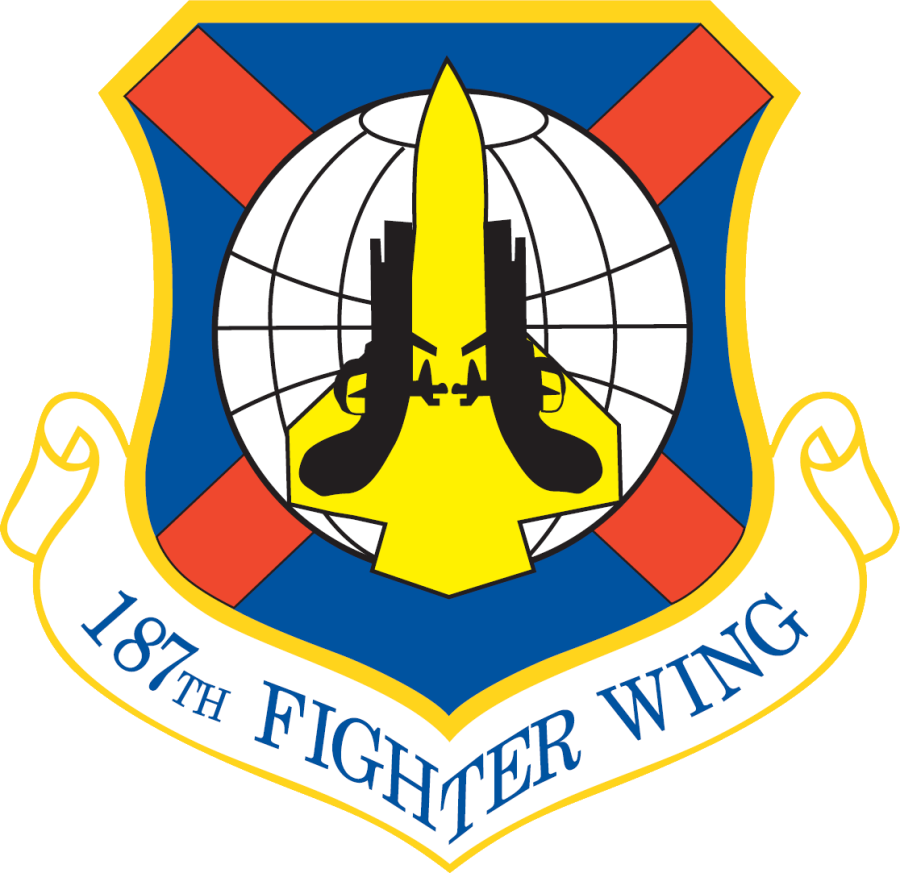
- 187th Fighter Wing emblem
- Tail code: AL

The 187th Fighter Wing is a unit of the Alabama Air National Guard, assigned to Dannelly Field, Alabama. If activated to federal service in the United States Air Force, the wing is operationally gained by the Air Combat Command.

Its mission is to provide the nation with a superior F-16C+ Block 30 Aviation Package, RC-26B Intelligence, Surveillance, and Reconnaissance platform, and Expeditionary Combat Support functions organized, trained, and equipped for rapid worldwide deployment, domestic relief, and law enforcement operations.

== Units ==
The 187th Fighter Wing consists of the following units:

- 187th Operations Group

100th Fighter Squadron

- 187th Maintenance Group
- 187th Mission Support Group
- 187th Medical Group

== History ==
On 15 October 1962, the Alabama Air National Guard's 160th Tactical Reconnaissance Squadron was authorized to expand to a group level, and the 187th Tactical Reconnaissance Group was established by the National Guard Bureau. The 160th becoming the group's flying squadron. Other squadrons assigned to the group were the 187th Headquarters, 187th Material Squadron, 187th Combat Support Squadron, and the 187th USAF Dispensary. The unit was flying the RF-84F Thunderstreak.

In 1971, the McDonnell RF-4C Phantom II photo-reconnaissance aircraft was being withdrawn from Southeast Asia, and the 160th began to receive these Vietnam War veteran aircraft. The RF-84Fs were retired and during the 1970s the squadron flew the Phantoms in its aerial reconnaissance mission.

=== Tactical Fighter ===
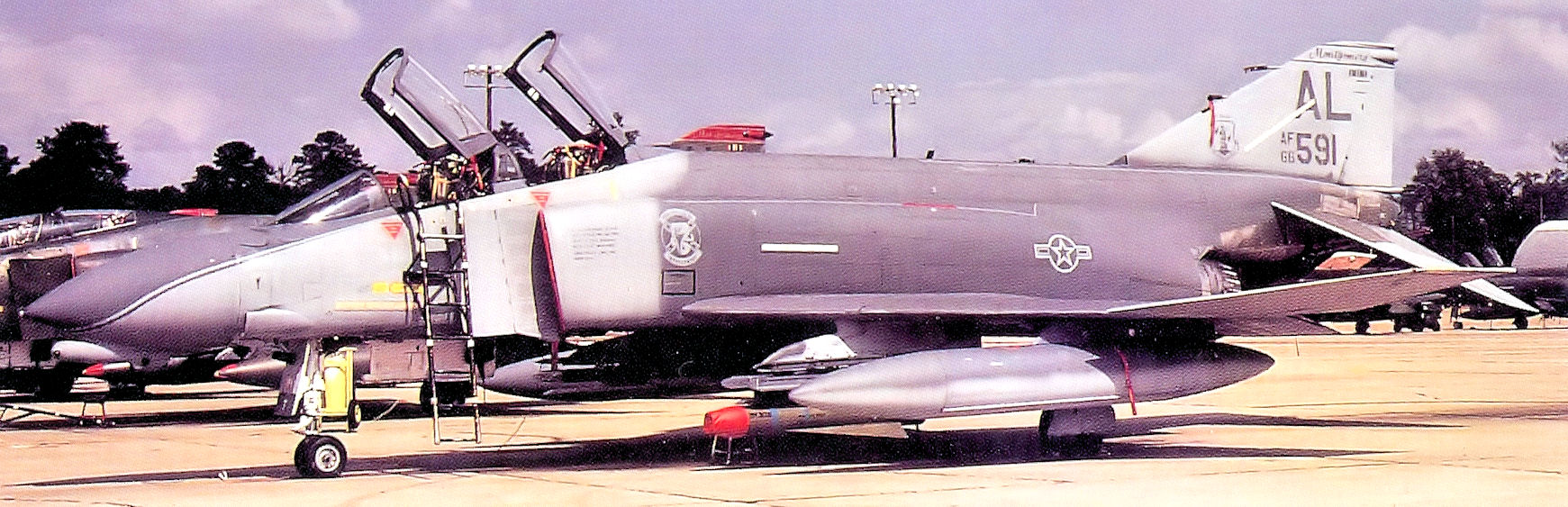
160th Tactical Fighter Squadron - McDonnell F-4D-30-MC Phantom, AF Ser. No. 66-7591

In 1983, the 187th was realigned from its photo-reconnaissance mission and converted to a tactical fighter mission, transferring its RF-4Cs and receiving Vietnam Veteran F-4D Phantom IIs. The F-4D Phantoms were part of a batch equipped to use the AVQ-23 Pave Spike laser designation pod and the AGM-65 Maverick ASM in the 1970s. By 1988 the Phantoms were being withdrawn from the Air National Guard inventory, and the 160th began to receive early F-16A/B Block 10 Fighting Falcons. It was later equipped with Block 30 F-16C/D Fighting Falcons to use in the tactical fighter mission.

During the 1990s, the 187th has undertaken an ambitious and successful regimen of participation in many Total Force deployments. These deployments have taken the men and women of the 187th to exercises in South Korea, Norway, Guam, Hawaii, Alaska, and many other stateside locations. By far the most significant deployments have been for contingency operations enforcing United Nations sanctions against Iraq. In 1995, the unit deployed for a 30-day rotation to Incirlik Air Base, Turkey for Operation Provide Comfort II. The following year, the Wing deployed to Al Jaber AB, Kuwait for Operation Southern Watch. Then in 1997, the wing returned to Incirlik for Operation Northern Watch. These operations were to enforce the respective northern and southern no-fly zones over Iraq.

=== Global War on Terrorism ===
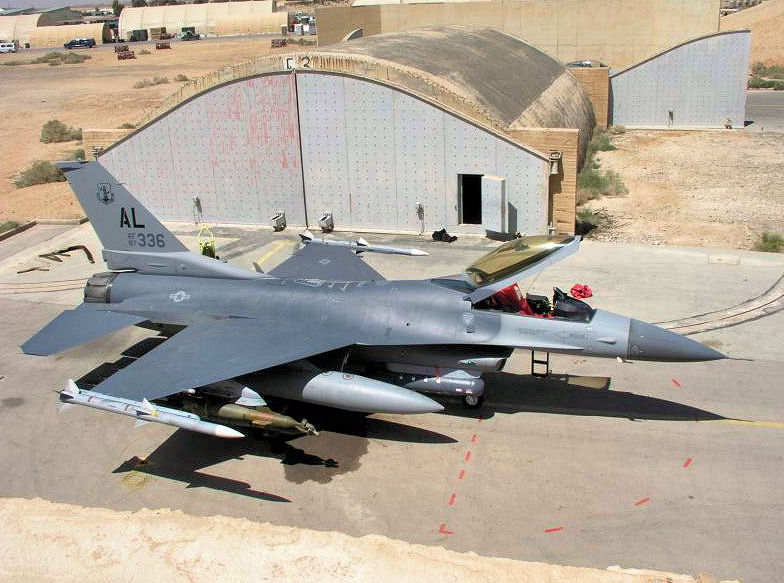
160th Expeditionary Fighter Squadron F-16C 87-0336 at Al Udeid AB, Qatar during Operation Iraqi Freedom, 2004.

After the 9/11 attacks, the 187th performed Combat Air Patrol flights as part of Operation Noble Eagle in the United States. The unit sustained this effort for Operation Noble Eagle for one year following the events of 11 September.

The 187th was again called to active duty from January 2003 until April 2003 as part of the largest military mobilization since the 1991 Gulf War. This marked the most significant unit activation in the unit's 50-year history with over 500 personnel being deployed along with aircraft and equipment for Operation Iraqi Freedom. The 187th, as an integral part of the Total Force, deployed to Prince Hassan Air Base (H-5) and Shahid Muafaq Al-Salti Air Base, Jordan, as the lead unit, commanding a mixture of Air National Guard, Air Force Reserve Command, Active Air Force and British Royal Air Force units comprising the 410th Air Expeditionary Wing. This marked the largest integration of coalition Air and Special Forces Operations in history with over 3,500 personnel operating out of this location. The 410th's mission was to prevent Iraqi missile launches against coalition forces and neighboring countries.

In September 2004, the unit again deployed over 300 personnel with aircraft and equipment to Al Udeid AB, Qatar for Operation Iraqi Freedom. This deployment also marked a significant first for the unit and the U.S. Military. The 187th was the first unit to use the GBU-38 Joint Direct Attack Munition in combat. The GBU-38 is a 500 lb global positioning system guided bomb which, while being very effective, minimizes collateral damage. The GBU-38 is a precision-guided munition commonly referred to as a "Smart Bomb". This weapon was effectively employed by the 187th in the Battle of Fallujah.

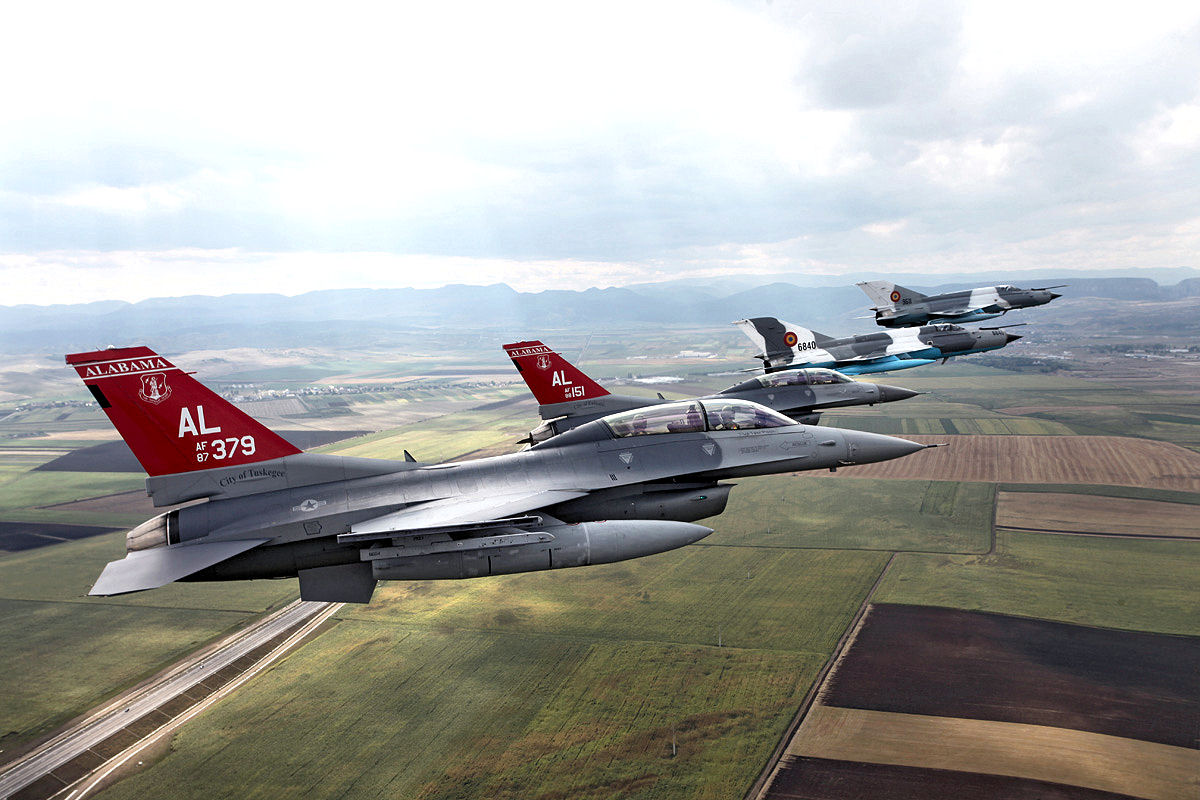
F-16 fighters of the 187th Fighter Wing fly in formation with Romanian Air Force MiG-21 LanceRs during exercise Dacian Viper 2012

In 2006, the 160th Expeditionary Fighter Squadron deployed to Balad Air Base, Iraq for 90 days and became part of the 322d Expeditionary Fighter Squadron in support of Operation Iraqi Freedom.

In 2007, the Alabama legislature requested the National Guard Bureau to allow the Alabama Air National Guard's 160th Fighter Squadron to be redesignated as the 100th Fighter Squadron so the state could honor the legacy of the World War II Tuskegee Airmen. This authorization was obtained from the Air Force to replace the 160th with the 100th and on 12 September 2009, the 100th Flying Training Squadron of the Air Education and Training Command was inactivated. The designation was transferred to the National Guard Bureau by the Air Force and it was allotted to the Alabama ANG. As a result, the 160th Fighter Squadron was inactivated and the newly-redesignated 100th Fighter Squadron assumed its personnel, equipment, and aircraft in a ceremony at Montgomery Air National Guard Base, on 13 September 2007.

In August 2009, the 100th Expeditionary Fighter Squadron deployed 240 airmen and aircraft to Balad Air Base, Iraq as part of the 332d Expeditionary Fighter Squadron supporting Operation Iraq Freedom. This was the first deployment of the 100th to the middle east and over 2,000 hours were flown and Precision Guided Munitions were employed. The unit returned to Montgomery in November 2009.

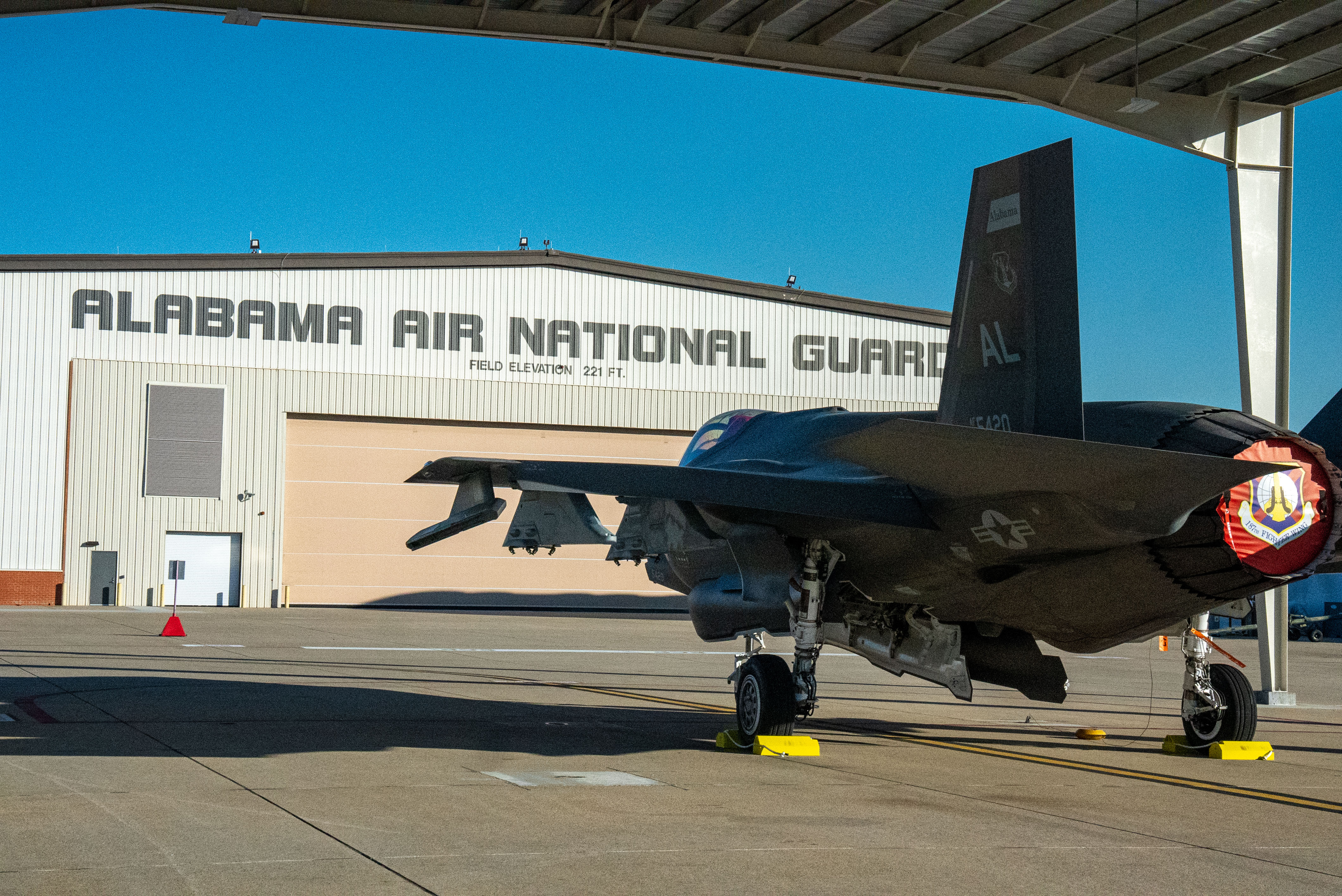
An F-35 Lightning II parked on the flight line at Dannelly Field

The wing participated in the Dacian Viper joint exercise in 2012 and 2015. During these exercises, about 150 personnel were deployed to the 71st Air Base located near the town of Câmpia Turzii in Romania. The F-16s of the 100th Fighter Squadron worked together with Romanian Air Force's MiG-21 Lancer fighters to strengthen interoperability and increase readiness in the event of combined air operations.

In December 2017, the Air Force announced that the 187th was one of two Air National Guard wings selected for equipping with the Lockheed Martin F-35 Lightning II. The conversion to the fifth-generation jet fighter is scheduled for 2023. The conversion process to the new aircraft began in March, and on 21 April the F-16s of the 187th Fighter Wing were retired from service following a formal ceremony. The first three F-35s arrived in December, with a total of 20 aircraft expected to arrive over the next five years. Full operational readiness is not expected until February 2026.

== Lineage ==
- Established as the 187th Tactical Reconnaissance Group and allotted to the National Guard on 11 September 1962

Activated and extended federal recognition on 15 October 1962
Redesignated 187th Tactical Fighter Group on 1 July 1983
Redesignated 187th Fighter Group on 15 March 1992
Redesignated 187th Fighter Wing c. 15 October 1995

=== Assignments ===
- 117th Tactical Reconnaissance Wing, 15 October 1962
- Ninth Air Force, June 1963
- 117th Tactical Reconnaissance Wing, June 1963
- 116th Tactical Fighter Wing, 1 July 1983
- Alabama Air National Guard, c. 15 October 1995

=== Components ===
- 187th Operations Group, c. 1 March 1994 – present
- 160th Tactical Reconnaissance Squadron (later 160th Tactical Fighter Squadron, 160th Fighter Squadron), 15 October 1962 – c. 1 March 1994

=== Stations ===
- Dannelly Field (later Montgomery Air National Guard Base), Alabama, 15 October 1962 – present

=== Aircraft ===
- RF-84F Thunderstreak, 1962-1971
- RF-4C Phantom II, 1971-1983
- F-4D Phantom II, 1983-1988
- Block 30 F-16C/D Fighting Falcon, 1988 – 2023
- Lockheed Martin F-35 Lightning II, 2023 – present
