= 160th Attack Squadron =

160th Attack Squadron

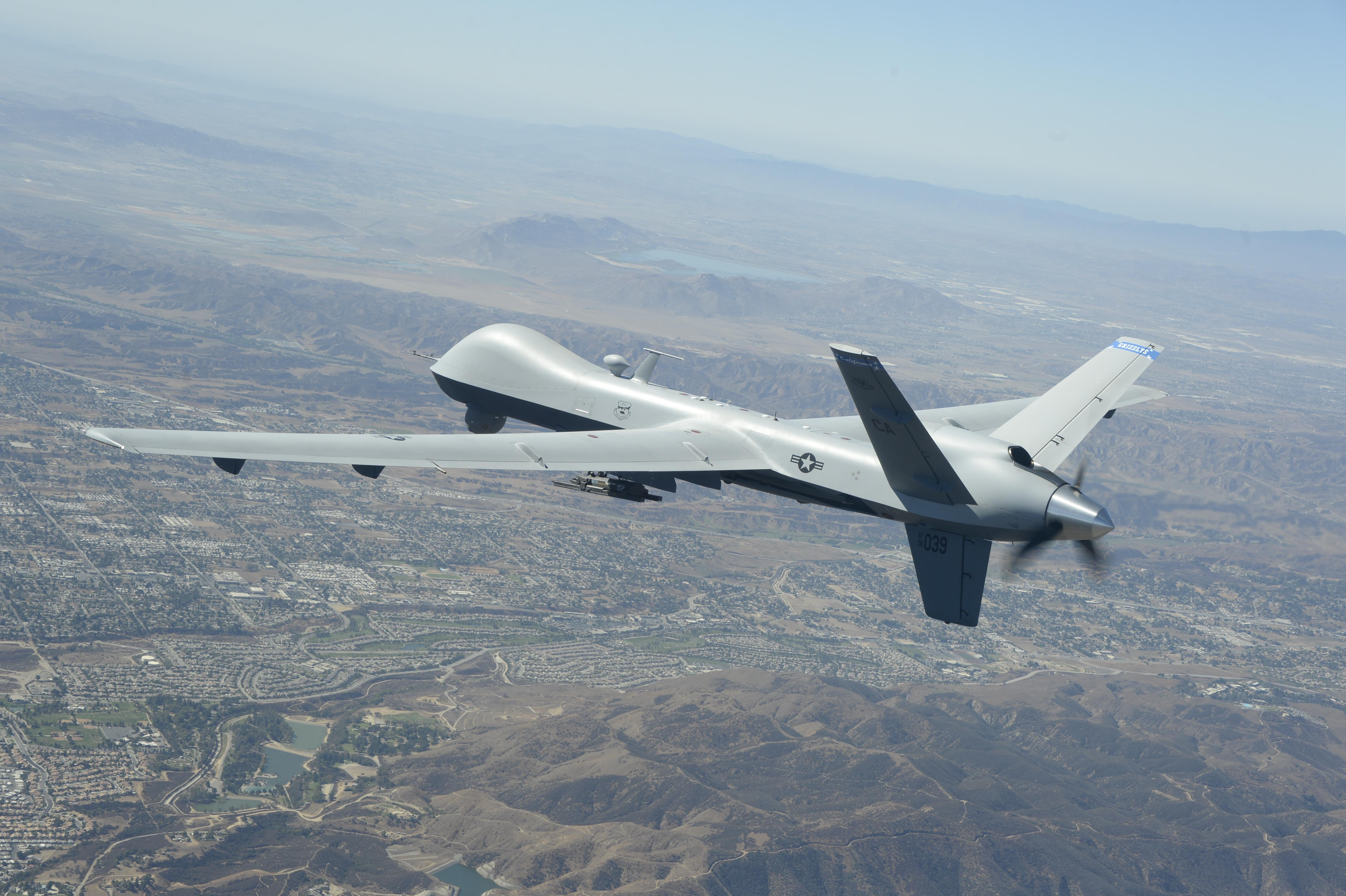
- 163d Attack Wing MQ-9 Reaper in flight
- Active: 1947–1952; 1952–2007; 2015–present
- Country: United States
- Allegiance: California
- Branch: Air National Guard
- Type: Squadron
- Role: Attack training
- Part of: California Air National Guard
- Garrison/HQ: March Air Reserve Base, California
- Nickname: Flying Cobras
- Mottos: Confirmatus et Interritus (Latin for 'Resolute and Undaunted')

Insignia
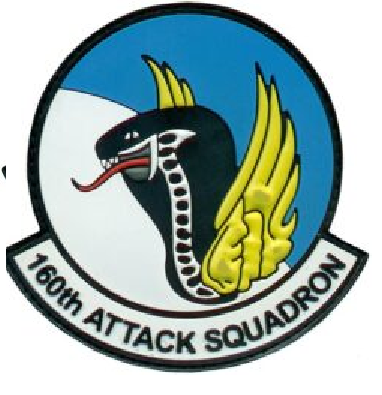
- 160th Attack Squadron emblem

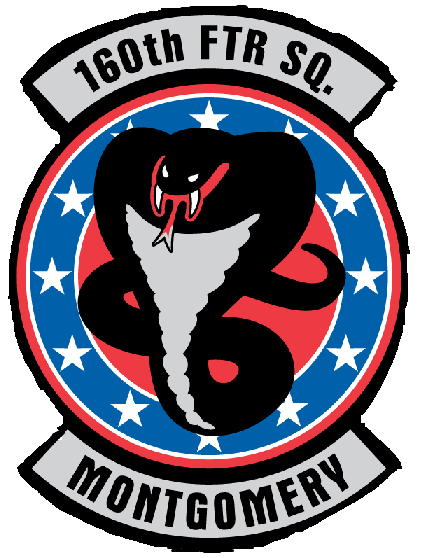
- 160th Fighter Squadron emblem

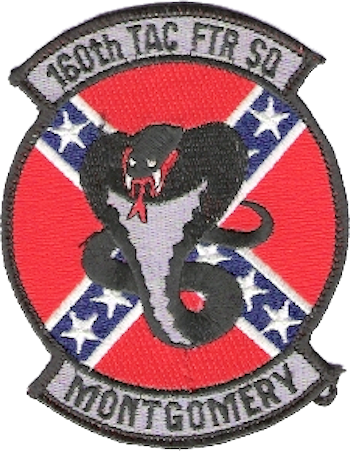
- 160th Tactical Fighter Squadron emblem

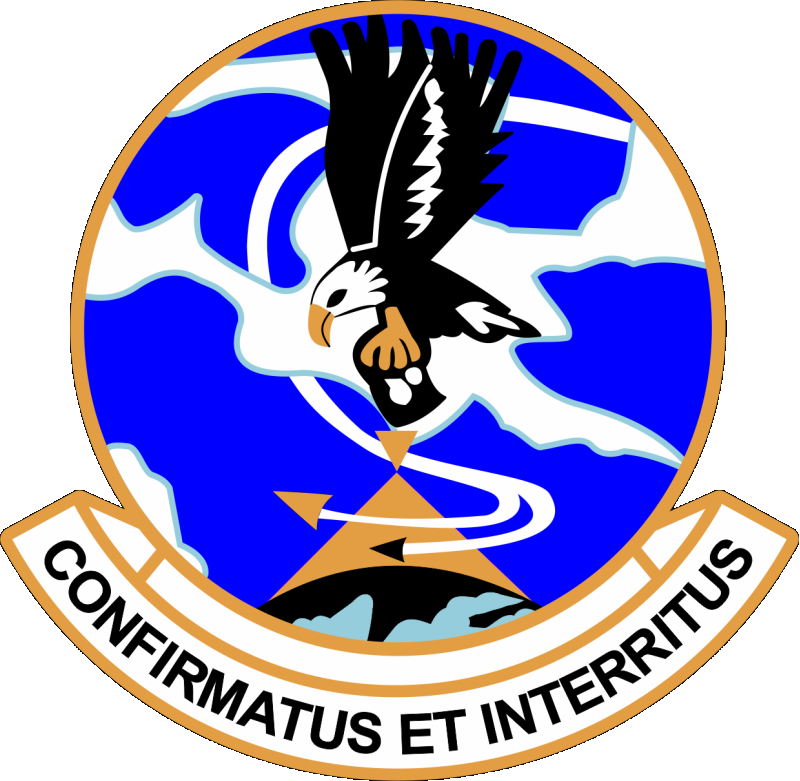
- 160th Tactical Reconnaissance Squadron emblem

Aircraft flown
- Attack: MQ-9 Reaper

The 160th Attack Squadron is a unit of the California Air National Guard, assigned to the 163rd Attack Wing at March Air Reserve Base, California. It currently serves as the formal training unit for the General Atomics MQ-9 Reaper.

Originally constituted in 1946 as the 160th Fighter Squadron, the unit has a long history of transitions. It served as a tactical reconnaissance unit during the Korean War, deploying to West Germany, and later operated as a tactical fighter squadron equipped with various aircraft, including the McDonnell F-4 Phantom II and the F-16 Fighting Falcon. After being inactivated in 2007 to honor the legacy of the Tuskegee Airmen through the activation of the 100th Fighter Squadron, the 160th was reactivated in 2015 in its current role.

== Mission ==
The squadron is the formal training unit for the General Atomics MQ-9 Reaper

== History ==
The squadron was constituted in 1946 as the 160th Fighter Squadron and allotted to the National Guard. (Note: On 24 May 1946, the 353d Fighter Squadron was redesignated the 160th Fighter Squadron and allotted to the National Guard. This action was retroactively revoked on 26 September 1956, and the 160th Fighter Squadron was constituted effective 24 May 1946.) It was organized at Birmingham Municipal Airport and extended federal recognition on 1 October 1947.

The squadron was assigned to the 117th Fighter Group and equipped with North American F-51D Mustangs. However, National Guard tactical air units were organized under an outdated organizational structure with no similarity to regular United States Air Force organizational structure and the mobilization mission of squadrons under that organizational structure was unknown.

=== Korean War activation ===
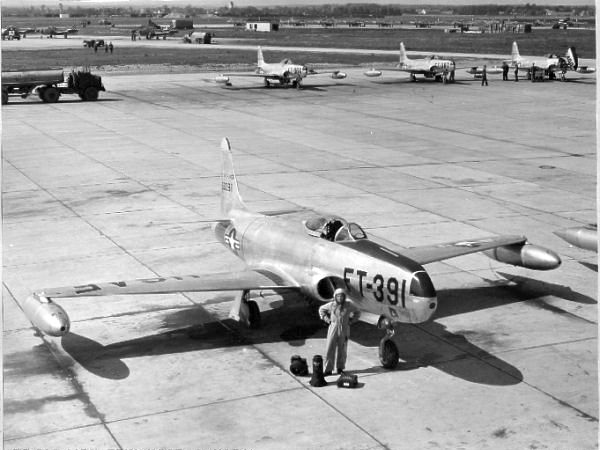
RF-80C Shooting Stars of the 160th Tactical Recon Squadron (Note: The aircraft in the foreground is Lockheed RF-80C-11-LO Shooting Star, serial 45-8391. The Photo was taken at Neubiberg AB, West Germany in 1952.)

The squadron and its parent group were among the first Air National Guard units federalized due to the Korean War on 10 October 1950. The squadron moved to Lawson Air Force Base, Georgia, where it was redesignated the 160th Tactical Reconnaissance Squadron. It received photographic reconnaissance models of the Mustang and in the summer began to equip with Lockheed RF-80A Shooting Star jets. At Lawson, the 117th Group was reorganized under the wing-base organization used by the regular Air Force and expanded to form the 117th Tactical Reconnaissance Wing, which was assigned to Ninth Air Force and Tactical Air Command. The new mission and expansion required and expanded period of training at Lawson.

At the end of 1951, the air echelon of the squadron ferried is RF-80s to Europe via Dow Air Force Base, Maine, while the ground echelon sailed on the USNS General W.G. Hahn. By January 1952 the squadron arrived at Toul-Rosières Air Base, but the hastily-built runway was breaking up and could not support safe flying. As a result the squadrons of the 117th Wing were dispersed to United States Air Forces in Europe (USAFE) bases in West Germany. After a brief stop at Furstenfeldbruck Air Base, West Germany, The 160th established itself at Neubiberg Air Base, West Germany, where it was supported by the 86th Fighter-Bomber Wing. Training flights began in March, but were inhibited by the lack of camera equipment for the squadron's RF-80s and shortages of spare parts for the planes.

In June 1952, the squadron participated in Exercise June Primer in which the squadron engaged in aerial photography of prospective gunnery ranges and airborne drop zones and artillery adjustment for the field artillery. The squadron also flew monthly missions photographing the construction of USAFE bases in France, West Germany, and the United Kingdom. On 10 July 1952 the activated squadron was released from active duty and returned on paper to the Guard. Its mission, aircraft and equipment were transferred to the newly activated 38th Tactical Reconnaissance Squadron.

=== Cold War ===
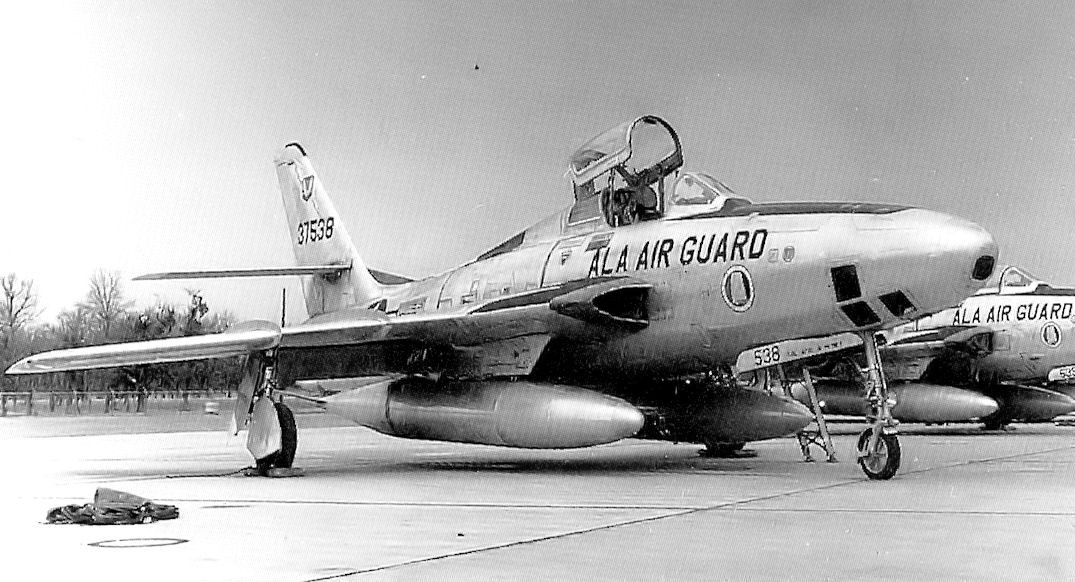
160th RF-84F Thunderflash, about 1960 (Note: Aircraft is Republic RF-84F-40-RE Thunderflash, serial 53-7538.)

The squadron was returned to state control and was activated in Birmingham, once again equipping with the RF-51D Mustang. Sharing the facility with the 106th Tactical Reconnaissance Squadron as well as the expanding civil airport led to congestion and in 1953, the 160th moved to Dannelly Field, near Montgomery, Alabama. The Mustangs were at the end of their USAF service in 1955 and the squadron received RF-80s which were also at the end of the line for their USAF service.

In 1956, the 160th began to receive new Republic RF-84F Thunderflash jet photo reconnaissance aircraft directly from Republic, replacing the obsolete RF-80s. The squadron continued to operate the RF-84s for the next fifteen years.

During the 1961 Berlin Crisis, the squadron was again federalized on 1 October 1961 along with the 117th Wing. Due to federal budget restrictions, only part of the wing and the 106th Tactical Reconnaissance Squadron deployed to France. The squadron remained at Dannally Field, prepared to reinforce the 106th Squadron if needed. The squadron was returned to state control without deploying on 20 August 1962.

Since 1950, the Air National Guard had been organized into wings, self-sustaining organizations, made up of functional groups. Because it was not practical to put an entire wing on a single installation for day to day operations, squadrons like the 160th were located on bases as “augmented squadrons” containing support elements needed to sustain operations. By the law at the time Guardsmen could only be activated as members of a mobilized unit. This meant that, even when only operational and maintenance elements were needed for mobilization, the entire “augmented squadron” had to be called to active duty, including unneeded administrative personnel. The response was to replace the “augmented squadron” with a group including functional squadrons that could be mobilized as a group, or individually. In this reorganization, the 187th Tactical Reconnaissance Group was established. The 160th became the group's flying squadron. Other elements forming the group were the 187th group headquarters, 187th Material Squadron, 187th Combat Support Squadron, and the 187th USAF Dispensary.

In 1971 the McDonnell RF-4C Phantom II photo reconnaissance aircraft was being withdrawn from Southeast Asia, and the 160th began to receive these Vietnam War veteran aircraft to replace its RF-84Fs.

=== Fighter operations ===
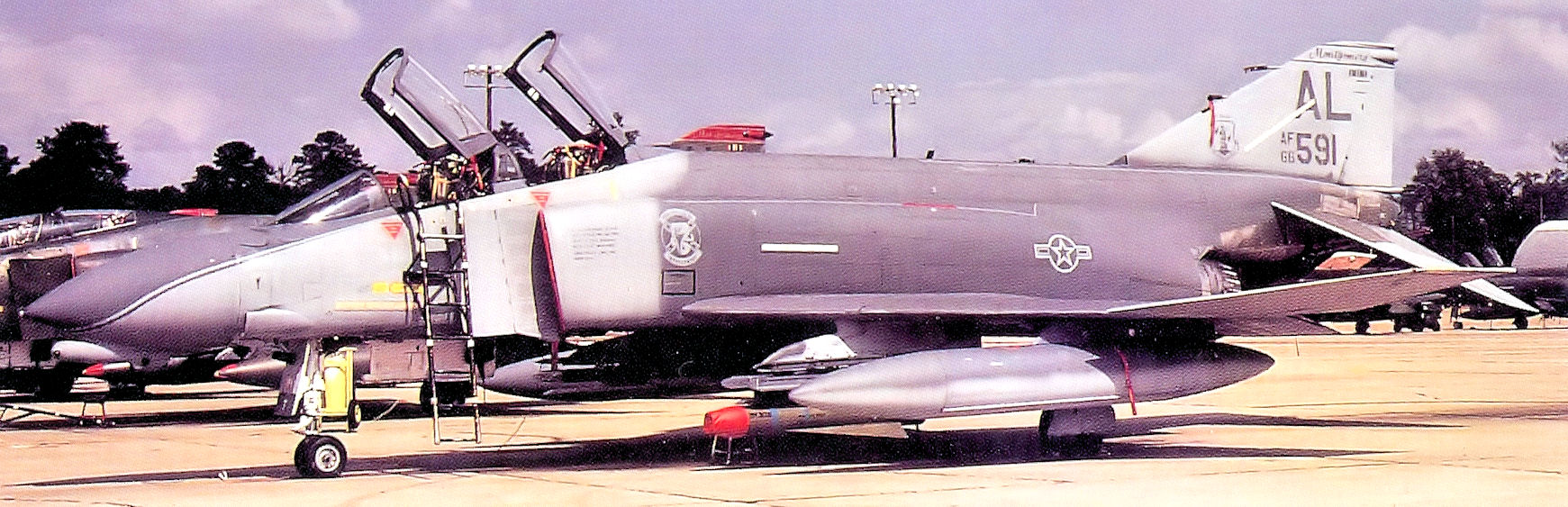
160th Tactical Fighter Squadron F-4D Phantom II (Note: Aircraft is McDonnell F-4D-30-MC Phantom II, serial 66-7591.)

In 1982 the 160th was realigned from its reconnaissance mission and converted to a tactical fighter mission, transferring its RF-4Cs and receiving F-4D Phantom IIs. The Phantoms were primarily used for air defense as part of the Air Defense, Tactical Air Command. In 1987, the squadron took overall best honors in the Air National Guard Fangsmoke competition. By 1988 the Phantoms were being withdrawn from the Air Force inventory, and the 160th began to receive Block 30 F-16C/D Fighting Falcons to use in the air defense mission.

During the 1990s, the 187th participated in many Force deployments. These deployments have taken the men and women of the 187th to exercises in South Korea, Norway, Guam, Hawaii, Alaska, and other locations. In 1995, the unit deployed for a 30-day rotation to Incirlik Air Base, Turkey for Operation Provide Comfort II. The following year, the squadron deployed to Ahmad al-Jaber Air Base, Kuwait for Operation Southern Watch. Then in 1997, the Wing returned to Incirlik for Operation Northern Watch. These operations were to enforce the northern and southern no-fly zones over Iraq.

=== Global War on Terrorism ===
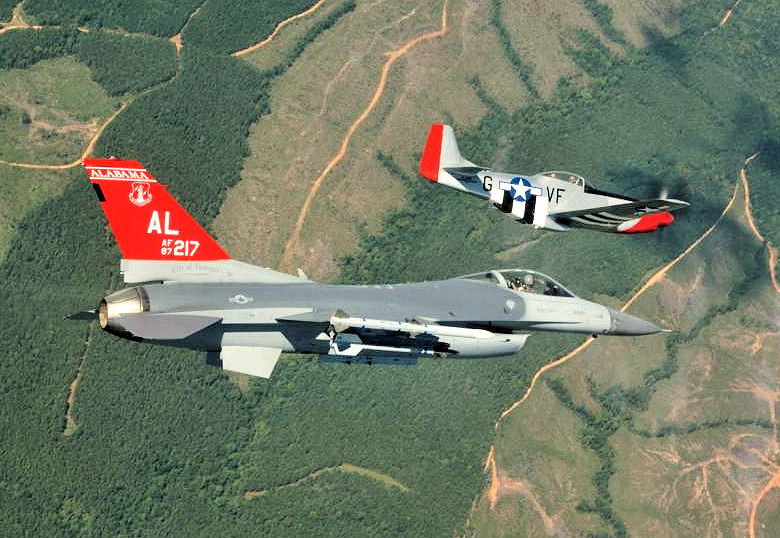
Squadron F-16C (Note: Aircraft is F-16C block 30, serial 87-0217 wearing special tail markings commemorating the reactivation of the Tuskegee Airmen.) in formation with a P-51 Mustang on 12 September 2007

After the 9/11 attacks, the squadron performed combat air patrol flights as part of Operation Noble Eagle in the United States. The unit sustained this effort for Operation Noble Eagle for one year following the events of 11 September.

The squadron was again called to active duty in January until April 2003 as part of the largest military mobilization since the 1991 Gulf War for Operation Iraqi Freedom. The squadron deployed with a mixture of Air National Guard, Air Force Reserve, Active Air Force and Royal Air Force units forming the 410th Air Expeditionary Wing. This marked the largest integration of coalition air and special forces operations in history with over 3,500 personnel operating out of this location. The 410th's mission was to prevent Iraqi missile launches against coalition forces and neighboring countries.

In September 2004 the unit deployed aircraft and equipment to Al Udeid Air Base, Qatar for Operation Iraqi Freedom. During this deployment, the squadron was the first unit to ever use the GBU-38 Joint Direct Attack Munition in combat during the Second Battle of Fallujah.

In 2007, the Air Force announced that the Alabama Air National Guard would activate the 100th Fighter Squadron to honor the legacy of the World War II Tuskegee Airmen. As a result, the 160th Fighter Squadron was inactivated, and the new 100th assumes its personnel, equipment and aircraft. The 160th Fighter Squadron marked its inactivation in a ceremony on 13 September 2007, with the 100th Fighter Squadron standing up.

=== Unmanned vehicle training ===
In 2015, the squadron was again activated at March Air Reserve Base in the California Air National Guard as the 160th Attack Squadron to act as the schoolhouse for MQ-9 Reaper units.

== Lineage ==
- Constituted as the 160th Fighter Squadron and allotted to the National Guard on 24 May 1946

Activated and extended federal recognition on 1 September 1947
Ordered to active service on 10 October 1950
Redesignated 160th Tactical Reconnaissance Squadron, Photo Jet on 27 October 1950
Inactivated, relieved from active duty and returned to state control on 10 July 1952
Ordered to active service on 1 October 1961
Relieved from active duty and returned to Alabama ANG, on 20 August 1962
Redesignated 160th Tactical Fighter Squadron on 8 July 1983
Redesignated 160th Fighter Squadron on 15 March 1992
Inactivated and withdrawn from the Air National Guard on 13 September 2007
Redesignated 160th Attack Squadron and allotted to the Air National Guard
Activated in 2015

=== Assignments ===
- 117th Fighter Group, 1 October 1947
- Fourteenth Air Force, 10 October 1950
- 117th Tactical Reconnaissance Group, 27 October 1950 – 20 July 1952
- 117th Tactical Reconnaissance Group, 20 July 1952
- Ninth Air Force June 1962
- 117th Tactical Reconnaissance Wing, June 1962
- Ninth Air Force, September 1962
- 117th Tactical Reconnaissance Group, September 1962
- 187th Tactical Reconnaissance Group (later 187th Tactical Fighter Group, 187th Fighter Group), 15 October 1962
- 187th Operations Group, 1 October 1995 – 13 September 2007
- 163rd Operations Group, 2015 – present

=== Stations ===
- Birmingham Municipal Airport, Alabama, 1 September 1947
- Lawson Air Force Base, Georgia, 2 November 1950
- Toul-Rosieres Air Base, January 1952
- Neubiberg Air Base, West Germany, 27 January – 10 July 1952
- Birmingham Municipal Airport, 10 July 1952
- Dannelly Field, Alabama (later Montgomery Air National Guard Base), 1 January 1953 – 13 September 2007
- March Air Reserve Base, 2015 – present

=== Aircraft ===
- North American F-51D Mustang, 1947–1950
- North American RF-51D Mustang, 1950–1951, 1952–1955
- Lockheed RF-80A Shooting Star, 1951–1953, 1955–1956
- Republic RF-84F Thunderflash, 1956–1971
- McDonnell RF-4C Phantom II, 1971–1983
- McDonnell F-4D Phantom II, 1982–1988
- General Dynamics Block 30 F-16C Fighting Falcon, 1988–2007
- General Dynamics Block 30 F-16D Fighting Falcon, 1988–2007
- General Atomics MQ-9 Reaper, 2015-present
