= Alabama Air National Guard =

Unit of the United States Air National Guard for the State of Alabama

- Shield of the Alabama Air National Guard
- Active: 21 January 1922 – present
- Country: United States
- Allegiance: Alabama
- Branch: Air National Guard
- Type: State militia, reserve force
- Role: "Provides mission ready forces to the federal government and the Governor of Alabama, while providing assistance to the citizens and civil authorities during natural disasters or emergencies under the command of the Adjutant General."
- Part of: Alabama National Guard; United States National Guard Bureau; National Guard
- Garrison/HQ: JFHQ-AL, 1720 Cong. W. L. Dickinson Dr., Montgomery, AL 36109
- Mottos: "Always Ready, Always There"

Commanders
- Civilian leadership: President Donald Trump (Commander-in-Chief); Troy E. Meink (Secretary of the Air Force); Governor Kay Ivey (Governor of the State of Alabama)
- State military leadership: Brigadier General David K. Pritchett (The Adjutant General); Brigadier General Tara D. McKennie (Assistant Adjutant General-Air and Air Component Commander); Brigadier General Edward D. Casey (Chief of Staff-Air)

Aircraft flown
- Fighter: F-35A Lightning II
- Tanker: KC-135R Stratotanker

The Alabama Air National Guard (AL ANG) is the aerial militia of the State of Alabama, United States of America. It is, along with the Alabama Army National Guard, an element of the Alabama National Guard.

As state militia units, the units in the Alabama Air National Guard are not in the normal United States Air Force chain of command unless federalized. They are under the jurisdiction of the governor of Alabama through the office of the Alabama Adjutant General unless they are federalized by order of the president of the United States. The Alabama Air National Guard is headquartered in Montgomery, and its commander is Major General Sheryl E. Gordon.

== Overview ==
Under the "Total Force" concept, Alabama Air National Guard units are considered to be Air Reserve Components (ARC) of the United States Air Force (USAF). Alabama ANG units are trained and equipped by the Air Force and are operationally gained by a major command of the USAF if federalized. In addition, the Alabama Air National Guard forces are assigned to Air Expeditionary Forces and are subject to deployment tasking orders along with their active duty and Air Force Reserve counterparts in their assigned cycle deployment window.

Along with their federal reserve obligations, the elements of the Alabama ANG are subject to being activated by order of the governor as state militia units to provide protection of life and property, and preserve peace, order and public safety. State missions include disaster relief in times of earthquakes, hurricanes, floods and forest fires, search and rescue, protection of vital public services, and support to civil defense.

== Components ==
The Alabama Air National Guard consists of the following major units:

- 117th Air Refueling Wing

Established 21 January 1922 (as: 106th Observation Squadron); operates: KC-135R Stratotanker
Stationed at: Sumpter Smith Air National Guard Base, Birmingham
Gained by: Air Mobility Command
The 117th Air Refueling Wing flies the Boeing KC-135R Stratotanker. Its mission is to train and equip combat ready aircrews and support personnel to perform worldwide aerial refueling and airlift missions.

- 187th Fighter Wing

Established 1 October 1947 (as: 160th Fighter Squadron); operates: F-35A Lightning II
Stationed at: Dannelly Field Air National Guard Base (aka Montgomery Regional Airport), Montgomery
Gained by: Air Combat Command
Flies F-35A Lightning II fighter for air defense, air superiority, and air sovereignty.

- 226th Combat Communications Group

Established 18 June 1954 (as: 225th Radio Relay Squadron)
Stationed at Abston Air National Guard Station; Montgomery
Gained by: Air Combat Command
The Group commands, organizes, trains, equips, and administers expeditionary communications squadrons.

== History ==
=== Origins ===
The Alabama Air National Guard origins date to 27 August 1917 with the establishment of the 106th Aero Squadron as part of the World War I American Expeditionary Force. The 106th served in France on the Western Front, then after the 1918 Armistice with Germany was demobilized in 1919.

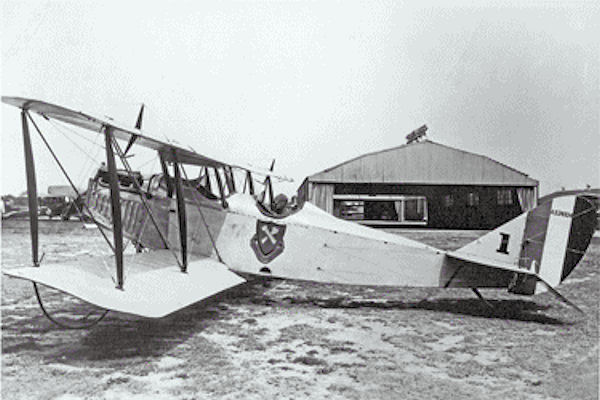
A Curtiss JN-6H of the 106th Observation Squadron, 1922

The Militia Act of 1903 established the present National Guard system, units raised by the states but paid for by the Federal Government, liable for immediate state service. If federalized by presidential order, they fall under the regular military chain of command. On 1 June 1920, the Militia Bureau issued Circular No.1 on organization of National Guard air units.

The squadron was reformed on 21 January 1922 as the 125th Squadron, Alabama National Guard, received federal recognition as a Corps Aviation unit. (It was re-designated the 135th Observation Squadron on 25 January 1923 and then it was re-designated the 114th Observation Squadron as an aviation unit the 39th Division on 1 May 1923. On 16 January 1924, it was re-designated the 106th Observation Squadron as an aviation unit in the 31st Division.) Maj. James A. Meissner, a World War I ace who had flown with Capt. Eddie Rickenbacker, led the effort to form the unit and served as its first commander. It is one of the 29 original National Guard Observation Squadrons of the United States Army National Guard formed before World War II.

The 106th Observation Squadron was ordered into active service on 125 November 1940 as part of the buildup of the Army Air Corps prior to the United States entry into World War II.

=== Alabama Air National Guard ===
On 24 May 1946, the United States Army Air Forces, in response to dramatic postwar military budget cuts imposed by President Harry S. Truman, allocated inactive unit designations to the National Guard Bureau for the formation of an Air Force National Guard. These unit designations were allotted and transferred to various State National Guard bureaus to provide them unit designations to re-establish them as Air National Guard units.

The modern Alabama ANG received federal recognition on 25 November 1946 as the 106th Bombardment Squadron (Light) at Birmingham MAP (Sumpter Smith Field). It was equipped with B-26B/C Invaders and was assigned to Tactical Air Command. 18 September 1947, however, is considered the Alabama Air National Guard's official birth concurrent with the establishment of the United States Air Force as a separate branch of the United States military under the National Security Act.

On 1 October 1947 the 117th Fighter Group allotted by the National Guard Bureau, extended federal recognition and activated at Birmingham, with the 106th Bomb Squadron being assigned to the unit. The 160th Fighter Squadron at Montgomery was authorized by the National Guard Bureau and recognized also on 1 October 1947. The 160th was equipped with the F-51D Mustang and its mission was the air defense of the state. On 15 October 1962, the 160th Tactical Reconnaissance Squadron was authorized to expand to a group level, and the 187th Tactical Reconnaissance Group was established by the National Guard Bureau. The 160th TRS becoming the group's flying squadron.

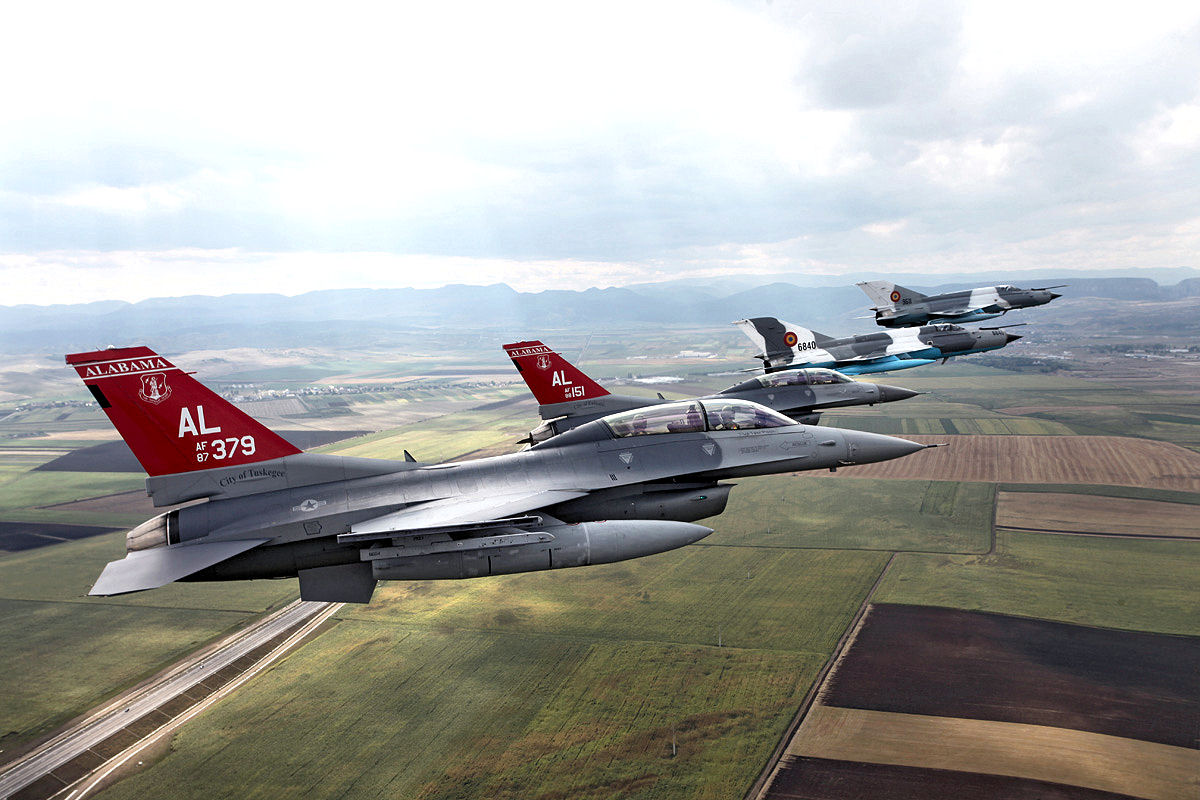
"Red Tails" F-16 Fighting Falcons of the 100th Fighter Squadron in Montgomery

In 2007, the Alabama legislature requested the National Guard Bureau to allow the Alabama Air National Guard 160th Fighter Squadron to be re-designated as the 100th Fighter Squadron so the state could honor the legacy of the World War II Tuskegee Airmen. This was obtained from the Air Force and on 12 September 2009, the 100th Flying Training Squadron was inactivated. The designation was transferred to the National Guard Bureau by the Air Force and it was allotted to the Alabama ANG. As a result, the 160th Fighter Squadron was inactivated, and the new 100th Fighter Squadron assumed its personnel, equipment and aircraft.

Today, the 117th Air Refueling Wing (117 ARW) provides aerial refueling support to Air Force, Navy and Marine Corps and allied nation aircraft. The 187th Fighter Wing (187 FW) operated the F-16 Fighting Falcon and deploys around the world as part of Air Expeditionary Forces. On April 21, 2023, the 187th Fighter Wing retired its inventory of F-16s after 35 years of service. Preparations began to take delivery of new production F-35A Lightning II aircraft, with initial delivery scheduled for December 2023.

After the 11 September 2001 terrorist attacks on the United States, elements of every Air National Guard unit in Alabama has been activated in support of the global war on terrorism. Flight crews, aircraft maintenance personnel, communications technicians, air controllers and air security personnel were engaged in Operation Noble Eagle air defense overflights of major United States cities. Also, Alabama ANG units have been deployed overseas as part of Operation Enduring Freedom in Afghanistan and Operation Iraqi Freedom in Iraq as well as other locations as directed.

=== Role in the Bay of Pigs Invasion ===
According to information from Seymour M. Hersh, author of The Dark Side of Camelot during early preparations to the Bay of Pigs Invasion, President Dwight D. Eisenhower personally asked then-Governor of Alabama John Malcolm Patterson (who served as a lieutenant in Eisenhower's staff during the World War II) to use the aircraft of Air National Guard of Alabama (Patterson, as governor, was commander-in-chief of the guard) by Cuban émigrés to attack and pilots to train them in deep secret in Nicaragua. Patterson agreed and then-commander, Major General George R. Doster was ordered to oversee all operation.

== Notable personnel ==
- George W. Bush

In late 1972 and early 1973, he drilled with the 187th Fighter Wing.

- Mal Moore, University of Alabama Athletic Director

== See also ==
- Alabama State Defense Force
- Alabama Wing Civil Air Patrol
