= 106th Air Refueling Squadron =

Alabama Air National Guard unit

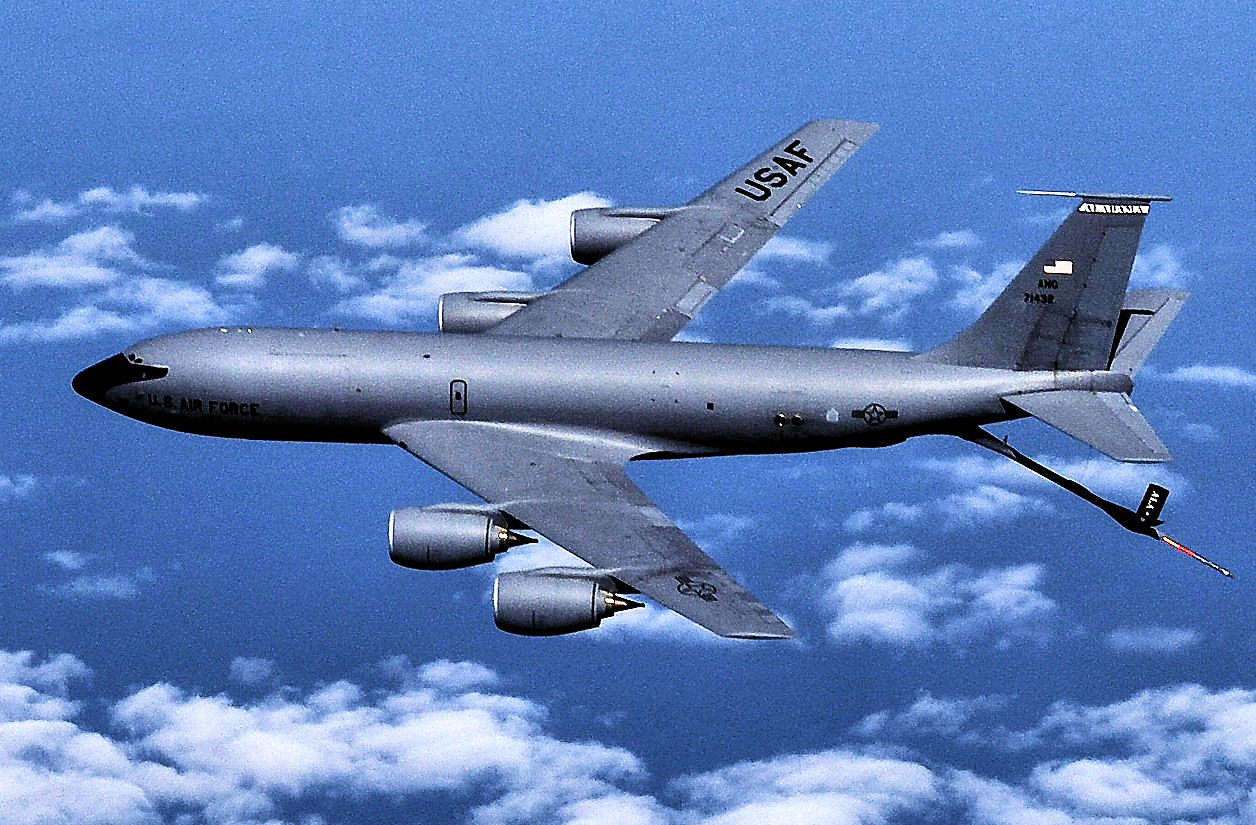
- 106th Air Refueling Squadron KC-135R Stratotanker
- Active: 1917–present
- Country: United States
- Allegiance: Alabama
- Branch: Air National Guard
- Type: Squadron
- Role: Aerial refueling
- Part of: Alabama Air National Guard
- Garrison/HQ: Birmingham Air National Guard Base, Birmingham, Alabama
- Nickname(s): Dixie Refuelers
- Tail Code: Alabama
- Engagements: World War I World War II; Korean War; Berlin Crisis of 1961; Vietnam War; Gulf War; Operation Noble Eagle

Insignia
- 106th Air Refueling Squadron Emblem

The 106th Air Refueling Squadron (106 ARS) is a unit of the Alabama Air National Guard 117th Air Refueling Wing. It is assigned to Birmingham Air National Guard Base, Alabama and is equipped with the KC-135R Stratotanker aircraft.

The squadron is a descendant organization of the World War I 106th Aero Squadron, established on 27 August 1917. It was reformed on 21 January 1922. After several designation changes, it was re-designated the 106th Observation Squadron on 16 January 1924 and is one of the 29 original National Guard Observation Squadrons of the United States Army National Guard formed before World War II.

== History ==
=== World War I ===
The 106th Air Refueling Squadron traces its origins to 26 August 1917 with the organization of the 106th Aero Squadron at Kelly Field, San Antonio, Texas. However, the unit was first formed about a week earlier when some Air Service recruits arrived at Kelly but remained an un-designated organization. The men were placed into basic indoctrination training, with drill, fatigue duty, classroom training, and other things that are done in military training camps. During its time at Kelly Field, men were transferred in and out of the squadron, depending on their qualifications and the needs of other units in training. Once basic indoctrination training was completed, the 118th was ordered for overseas duty, being ordered to report to the Aviation Concentration Center, Garden City, Long Island on 4 November. It was there that final arrangements were made for the trip overseas, complete equipment was drawn and a final few transfers were made.

At Garden City, the squadron was assigned to "Provisional Wing #2", which consisted of the 106th, 107th, 108th, 109th and 116th Aero Squadrons. On 7 December 1917, the wing boarded a train at Garden City, and went northwards to Halifax, Nova Scotia, where it arrived on 12 December. The squadrons boarded the RMS Tunican and began its trans-Atlantic sailing, arriving at Liverpool, England on 26 December. It was snowing when the squadron arrived in England, and the men loaded onto a train, heading south through a blizzard, arriving at Southampton. There the men marched though the snow to a rest camp. On the 29th, the squadron crossed the English Channel, arriving in Le Havre, France later that day, marching in about a foot of snow to another rest camp. The squadron then traveled by train to the Replacement Concentration Center, AEF, St. Maixent Replacement Barracks, France, arriving on 2 January 1918. At St. Maixent the Provisional Wing was dissolved and the men put into barracks out of the snow with plenty of hot coffee. The 106th remained at St. Maixent until 26 February, its designation being changed to the 800th Aero Squadron.

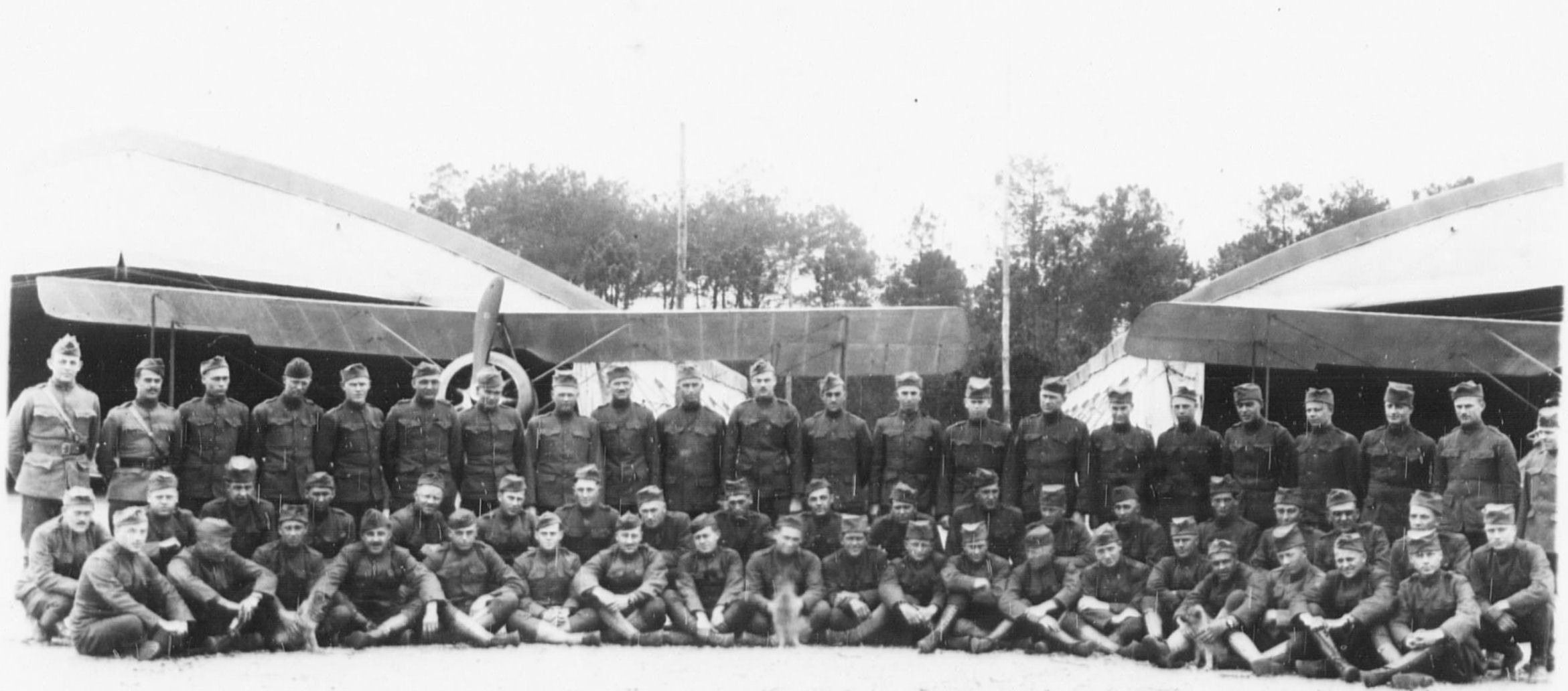
800th Aero Squadron – Headquarters Flight "A" 5th Aerial Artillery Observation School.

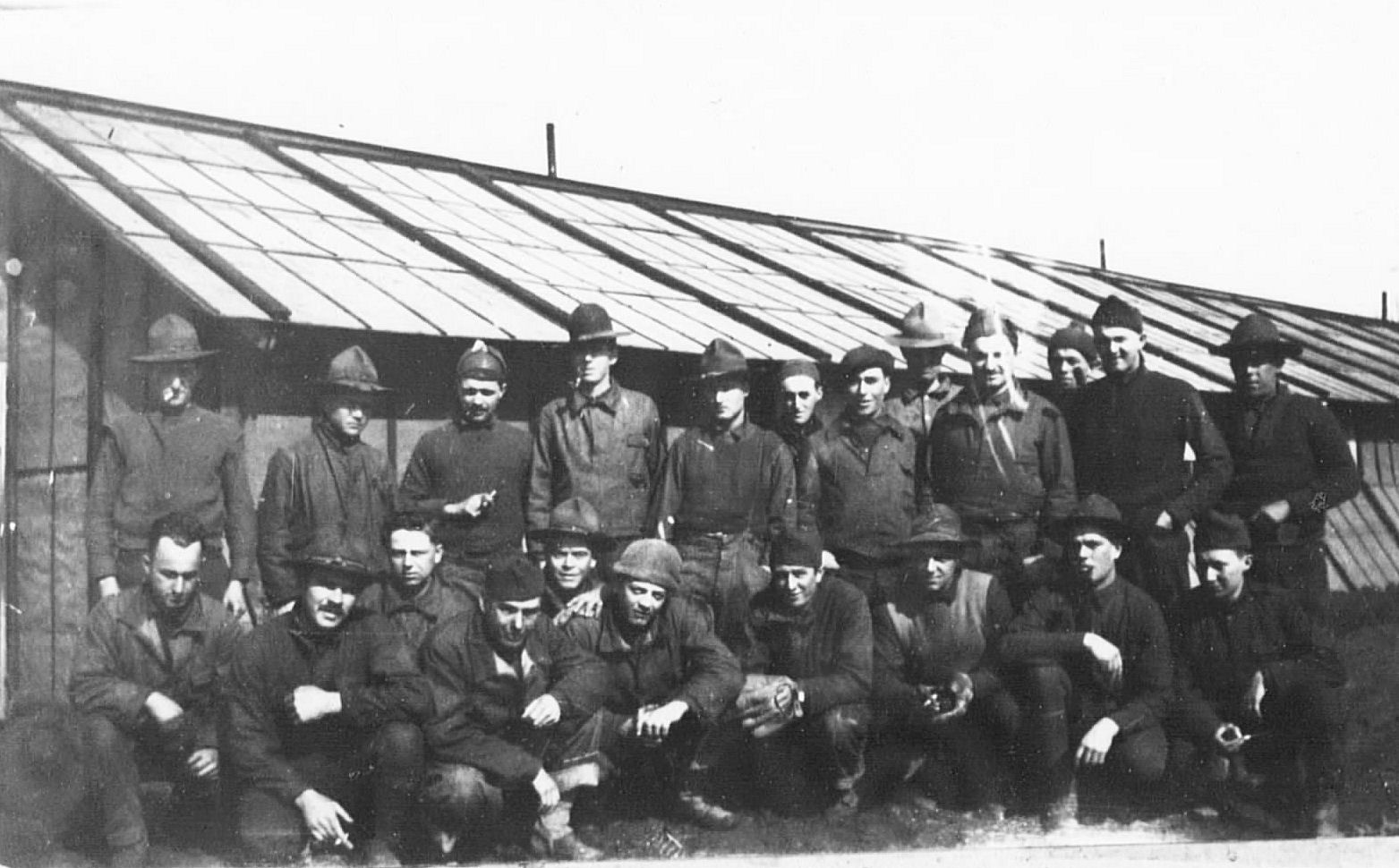
800th Aero Squadron – Flight B, 1st Aerial Artillery Observation School (1st AAOS).

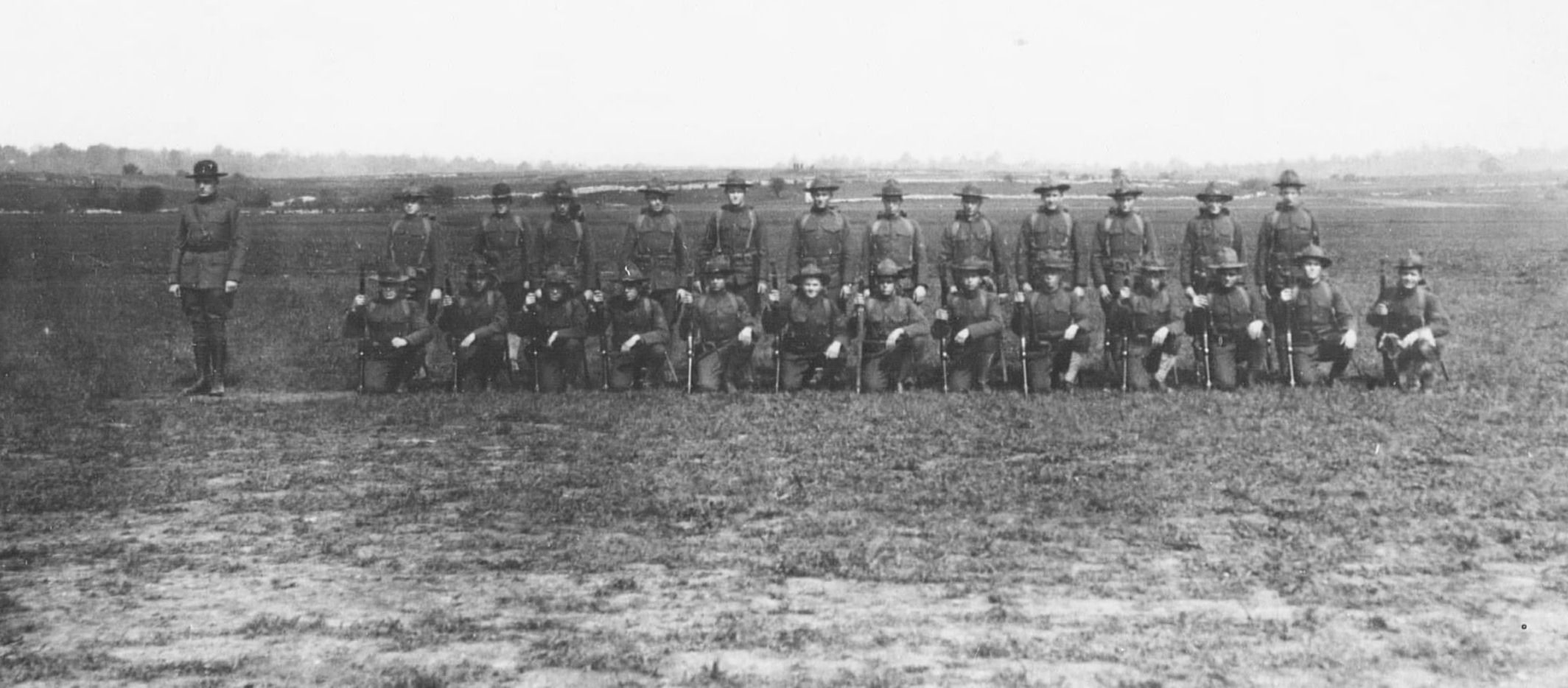
800th Aero Squadron – Flight C, 5th Aerial Artillery Observation School (5th AAOS).

On 26 February, the 800th Aero Squadron was divided into three flights, each of which would be able to function as an individual unit in the repair and upkeep of airplanes and engines.

Headquarters, Flight "A" was dispatched to the 5th Aerial Artillery Observation School (2d AAOS), Camp de Souge, Base Section No. 2, Bordeaux.

Flight "B" was dispatched to the 1st Aerial Artillery Observation School (1st AAOS), Camp Coëtquidan (Camp de Coëtquidan) a French military educational facility located in Guer, Morbihan département, in Brittany.

Flight "C" was dispatched to the 5th Aerial Artillery Observation School (5th AAOS), Camp La Valdehon, Doubs.

An effort was made to have each of the flights as nearly equal in skilled mechanics and other trained personnel as far as possible, each flight consisting of about 50 men. At this point, the history of the squadron may be said to be a combination of each of these separate flights.

Headquarters Flight "A" arrived at Bordeaux on 28 February and were taken to some brick barracks. The flight learned they would be the entire enlisted personnel of the 2d AAOS. The camp was policed from the entrance to the camp to the flying field, with weeds and underbrush cut to make the field usable for airplanes. A program of camp sanitation was begun and the men of the squadron performed many duties, from furnishing electrical power to the buildings as well as supplying the goods and services necessary for the operation of the school. The camp had the appearance of a well-kept US Army Post in the United States. In March, the first airplanes arrived at the school, Sopwith 1A2s. In September, ten Curtiss JN-4 trainers arrived from the United States, the JN-4s being the only ones in France. Some Dayton-Wright DH-4s arrived in early November from the Air Service Production Center No. 2, Romorantin Aerodrome. Flight "B" of the squadron was moved to Camp de Souge on 30 October and consolidated with Headquarters, Flight "A".

Flight "B" of the 800th Aero Squadron arrived at the 1st AAOS in Coëtquidan on 1 March 1918. Coëtquidan was, in fact, one of the largest artillery camps since the time of Napoleon and had recently been turned over to the United States Army. Some Americans had already arrived and assembled six ancient French planes, the men having completed courses of instruction at the Renault, Loraine, Dietrich, Farman and Breguet engine factories. The school was supplied with new aircraft, primarily SPAD observation planes from Romorantin Aerodrome. At the end of October, the flight was relieved from Coëtquidan and transferred to Bordeaux where it rejoined Headquarters, Flight "A".

Flight "C" of the 800th arrived at Le Valdahon, Doubs on 3 March. The men found the camp knee-deep in mud and still growing deeper. The men were taken to the Headquarters, 17th Field Artillery where they received a warm resection with warm meals and some comfortable quarters. The aviation camp, where the 5th AAOS was to be operated, however, had been unoccupied for months, and was in a severely dilapidated state. To make it even a half-way decent place seemed a hopeless task. However, orders were received to do so and construction materiel was received to put the camp into a serviceable condition. The barracks were overhauled, a kitchen built along with a mess hall. Men without carpentry or other construction skills were put into building serviceable streets and also erecting some hangars and cleaning up the airfield. On 21 April, the first Sopwith airplanes arrived from Tours Aerodrome. As time passed, additional facilities were built and conditions improved, to the point of building tennis courts in August. With the Armistice with Germany in November 1918, the 800th Aero Squadron was still divided at both locations, both remaining in France until well into 1919. Flights "A" and "B" returned home to the United States in May, while Flight "C" did not return until July 1919. They arrived at Mitchel Field, New York, where the squadron members were demobilized and returned to civilian life.

Many additional World War I squadron photographs are available by clicking the Wikipedia Commons link to the right.

=== Alabama National Guard ===
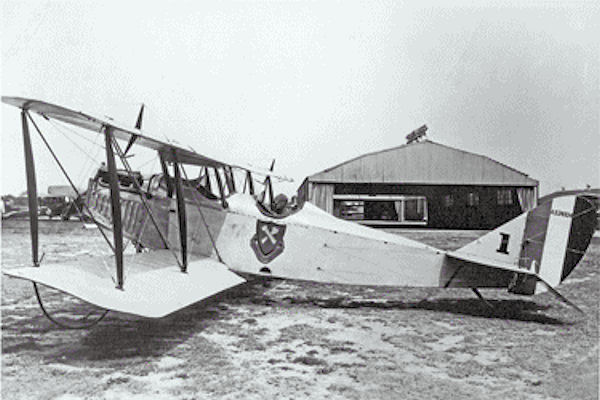
106th Observation Squadron Curtiss JN-6H

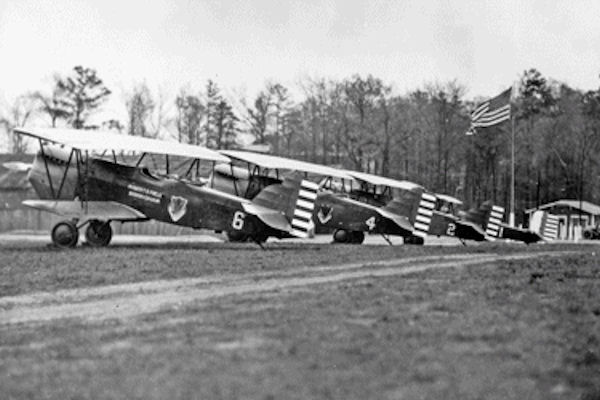
106th Observation Squadron Douglas O-38s

On 21 January 1922 the 125th Squadron, Alabama National Guard, received federal recognition as a Corps Aviation unit. (It was re-designated the 135th Observation Squadron on 25 January 1923 and then it was re-designated the 114th Observation Squadron as an aviation unit the 39th Division on 1 May 1923. On 16 January 1924, it was re-designated the 106th Observation Squadron as an aviation unit in the 31st Division.) Maj. James A. Meissner, a World War I ace who had flown with Capt. Eddie Rickenbacker, led the effort to form the unit and served as its first commander.

The early years were challenging. Land was donated for what would become Roberts Field. Steel was salvaged from old wartime hangars to build new hangars. Birmingham citizens donated money to defray construction expenses. Squadron members even returned their pay to the squadron to defray costs and supplied much of the labor themselves. In the first few years of operation, while constructing the facilities at Roberts Field, the Squadron participated in mine rescue work, began a program of providing aerial photographs of points of industrial and historical interest throughout Alabama, and provided the first Air Mail service in the State of Alabama. By 1929, the Squadron had transitioned from Major Meissner to W.V.M. Robertson Jr., and then to Lt. Col. Sumpter Smith. Under the command of Lt. Col. Smith in 1929, the Squadron rendered its "greatest service to the State of Alabama" when the entire Squadron was ordered to active duty for flood relief in south Alabama. Twenty-five officers and 100 men participated for 14 days and nights, flying a total of approximately 300 hours dropping food and medicine to marooned families. The airdrop of supplies was among the first of its kind in aviation history.

By 1930, the facilities at Roberts Field were long-since declared inadequate by numerous inspectors, but the Squadron did not have the funds to move. A steady campaign of publicity and pressure on legislative and local government was maintained until the decision was made to build new facilities for the 106th Observation Squadron at the Birmingham Municipal Airport as part of the government works project in 1934. When Colonel Smith moved up to the 31st Division, command of the Squadron passed to Henry Badham Jr., one of the founding members of the Birmingham Flying Club. On 16 January 1936, James Meissner, the father of the Alabama Air National Guard, died from pneumonia. The city held a memorial service involving a flyover by the planes of the unit he founded and his old friend and former World War I wingman, Eddie Rickenbacker, returned to Birmingham to be an honorary pall-bearer. Major Meissner is buried at Arlington National Cemetery.

In 1936, the 106 Aero Squadron was consolidated with the 106th Observation Squadron of the Alabama National Guard. It took nearly four years to complete the construction of the new home of the 106th Observation Squadron at the Birmingham Municipal Airport, but in 1938 the Squadron was finally able to move into its new quarters. Eventually, the base was named after the colonel who helped ensure its construction, Colonel Sumpter Smith.

=== World War II ===
The 106th was ordered to active duty on 25 November 1940 as part of the buildup of the Army Air Corps after the Fall of France. Ordered to the 36th Street Airport, Miami, Florida after the Pearl Harbor Attack in mid-December 1941, the Guardsmen flew antisubmarine patrols over the Florida Atlantic coast until September 1942, also operating from Jacksonville and Savannah, Georgia.

Transferred to Third Air Force and moved to Tennessee in late 1942, the 106th began training for combat observation and liaison duties then as a medium bombardment squadron flying the B-25 Mitchell. This new mission was reflected in a name change when the 106 Observation Squadron was re-designated 106 Reconnaissance Squadron (Bombardment) on 2 April 1943. In late 1943, the 106th was deployed to the South Pacific Area (SPA) and arrived at Guadalcanal on 15 November 1943, the 106th immediately began performing its new bombing mission. In the Pacific Theater, the squadron engaged enemy forces in New Guinea; the Northern Solomon Islands; Bismarck Archipelago; on Leyte, Luzon and Mindanao in the Philippine Campaign, and also in southeast China. At the end of the war, the 100th Bombardment Squadron (Medium), the final wartime designation of the squadron, was inactivated in the Philippines on 11 December 1945.

For its combat service in the South Pacific, the 100th Bombardment Squadron was awarded the Distinguished Unit Citation: Balikpapan, Borneo, 23–30 Jun 1945, and the Philippine Presidential Unit Citation.

=== Alabama Air National Guard ===
The wartime 100th Bombardment Squadron was re-activated and re-designated as the 106th Bombardment Squadron (Light) and was allotted to the Alabama Air National Guard, on 24 May 1946. It was organized at Birmingham Municipal Airport and was extended federal recognition on 25 November 1946. The 106th Bombardment Squadron was bestowed the history, honors, and colors of the 100th Bombardment Squadron and its predecessor units. The squadron was equipped with B-26C Invader light bombers and was assigned to the 54th Fighter Wing, Georgia ANG for administration, while being under the operational control of the Alabama Air National Guard.

The 106th Bombardment Squadron practiced formation bombing as well as low-level intrusion and strafing. Parts for the B-26s were no problem with the massive amount of supplies still stored in wartime warehouses, and many of the maintenance personnel were World War II veterans so readiness was quite high and the planes were often much better maintained than their USAF counterparts. On 1 October 1947 the squadron came under the control of the new 117th Tactical Reconnaissance Group at Birmingham, and in 1950, the B-26 Invader light bombers were exchanged for RB-26C Invader reconnaissance aircraft which were unarmed and carried cameras and flash flares for night photography.

During the Korean War, the 106th Tactical Reconnaissance Squadron (Night Photo) was federalized and assigned to the Ninth Air Force 363d Tactical Reconnaissance Group at Shaw AFB, South Carolina. It moved to Shaw on 5 January 1952 where it replaced the 162d Tactical Reconnaissance Squadron which was deployed to Itazuke AB, Japan to fly photo-reconnaissance missions over Korea. At Shaw, it joined the 16th and 18th TRS flying night reconnaissance training missions with the RB-26C. Many of the squadron's pilots were deployed to Japan and South Korea where they served in combat, flying hazardous unarmed night reconnaissance missions over enemy-held territory. On 1 January 1953 the 106th was returned to Alabama state control and returned to Birmingham.

The squadron continued to fly the RB-26C until 1957 when the aircraft was reaching its end of operational service and was retired. Replacing the Invader in May 1957 were new RF-84F Thunderflash jet reconnaissance aircraft, manufactured by Republic for Air National Guard service. The squadron continued to train in tactical reconnaissance missions throughout the 1950s with the Thunderflashes.

==== 1961 Berlin Crisis ====
The squadron was federalized a second time on 1 October 1961 as a result of the 1961 Berlin Crisis. The 117th TRG was again federalized, which consisted of the 160th TRS from Montgomery; the 106th TRS at Birmingham; the 153d Tactical Reconnaissance Squadron (Mississippi ANG), and the 184th Tactical Reconnaissance Squadron (Arizona ANG). Due to federal budget restrictions, only the 106th TRS was deployed to Dreux-Louvilliers AB, France, however, elements of all three other squadrons rotated to France as part of the USAFE 7117th Tactical Wing over the next year and 106th pilots returned to the United States.

On 27 October twenty 106th TRS RF-84F's were deployed to Dreux, arriving on 3 November. In addition, two T-33A Shooting Star jet trainers and one C-47 Skytrain were deployed as support aircraft. By 22 November, the wing reassembled at the newly reactivated Dreux for an estimated stay of ten months. However, problems developed immediately after their arrival at Dreux. The base had been in standby status for about a year and no longer was used for operational flights. Possibly the French forgot to take into account the fact that the base could be re-opened for exercises and deployments such as was now the case.

In any event, the more than one thousand airmen of the 106th TRS arrived at a base that had been stripped clean. The French had taken away office desks, telephones and typewriters. The kitchens had not been used for some time, a fact that the quartermasters had not taken into account, so getting the base operational again in the short time available took an all-out effort. A few days after the ground units arrived from Alabama, the first aircraft were prepared for a practice flight. The French Air Traffic Controllers, however, refused permission for take-off. Only after a lot of negotiation were several aircraft allowed to take to the air.

Dreux AB came within the Paris Air Traffic Control area, as did the busy Le Bourget Airport and Orly Airports, and an extra squadron of jet aircraft had not been allowed in the French air traffic controllers' staffing levels. The safety of civilian air traffic was used to justify denying the Americans permission to fly out of Dreux AB. Notwithstanding stormy protests by the United States, every form of co-operation was refused and the RF-84s stayed on the ground. The pilots who had only just completed a risky Atlantic crossing of several thousand kilometers, had to wait in the operations room. In the United States, the Birmingham News daily newspaper reported that 'their boys', after the sudden mobilization and the weeks of preparation, had not been sent to Europe to sit around a French airfield doing nothing.

However, as strongly the Pentagon protested, the French answer remained 'non!'. Eventually, General Reid Doster, commander of the Alabama deployment could do little else but take his aircraft elsewhere. At the end of November 1961 he received permission from the French traffic controllers to go with his aircraft to Chaumont-Semoutiers AB, another USAFE-controlled base in France. Permission was received from the French to move the 7117th TRW on 8 December 1961, however HQ USAFE insisted that the 7117th Wing HQ remain at Dreux AB for airlift traffic. Thus the 106th TRS operated from Chaumont AB, while Wing HQ remained at Dreux.

On 22 July 1962 the 106th TRS returned to Alabama leaving its F-84Fs in France. Dreux AB was placed back in standby status by USAFE, and never really used again until it was turned over to the French in 1966.

==== Vietnam and late Cold War era ====
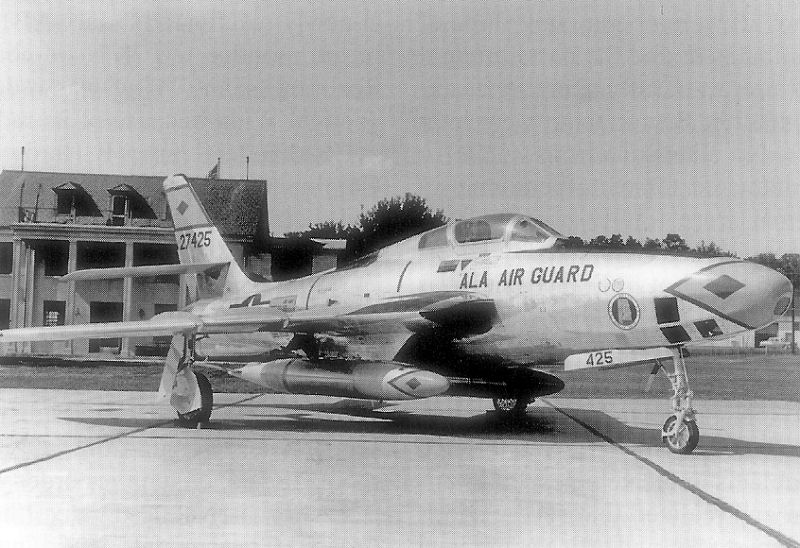
Republic RF-84F-30-RE Thunderflash of the 106th TRS, Alabama Air National Guard, 52-7425

After the squadron re-formed in Birmingham, the 106th TRS was again re-equipped with RF-84Fs from active-duty squadrons that were receiving the McDonnell RF-101 Voodoo. It continued to fly the Thunderflash reconnaissance aircraft throughout the 1960s.

As the RF-84F was not used during the Vietnam War, the 117th TRG was not activated for duty in Southeast Asia, although some pilots from the 106th went through transition training to the RF-101C and RF-4C and were deployed for combat duty.

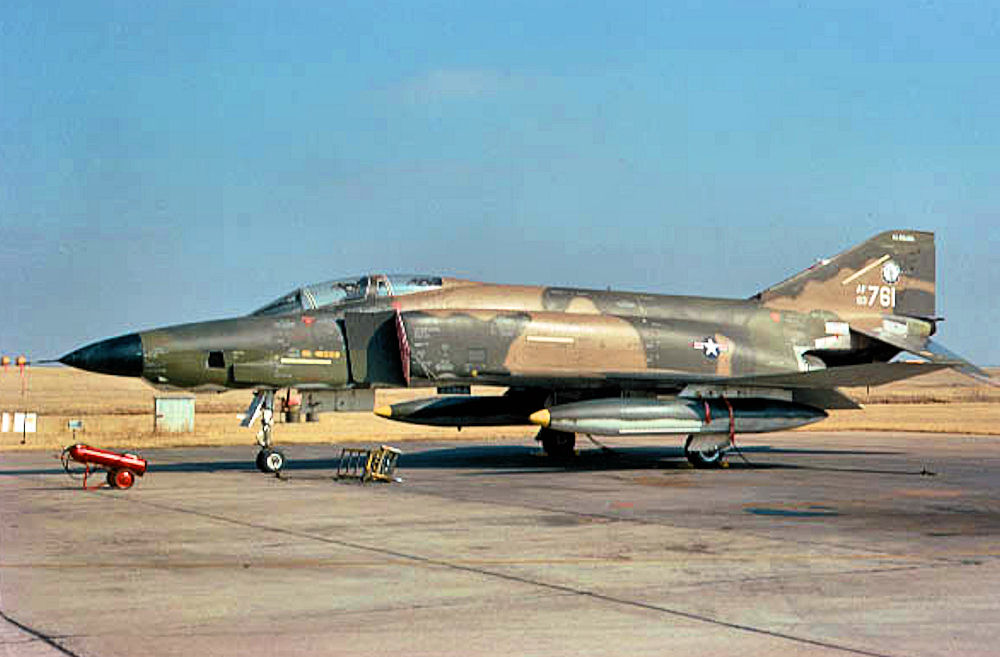
106th TRS RF-4C 66-7761 about 1972, shortly after its transfer from the 432d Tactical Reconnaissance Wing, Udorn RTAFB, Thailand.

In November 1971 the Thunderflashes were retired as they reached the end of their service life and the 117th TRG was chosen to be the first Air National Guard squadron to receive the RF-4C Phantom II tactical reconnaissance aircraft. The squadron received aircraft directly being withdrawn from Southeast Asia as part of the United States pullout from the Vietnam War.

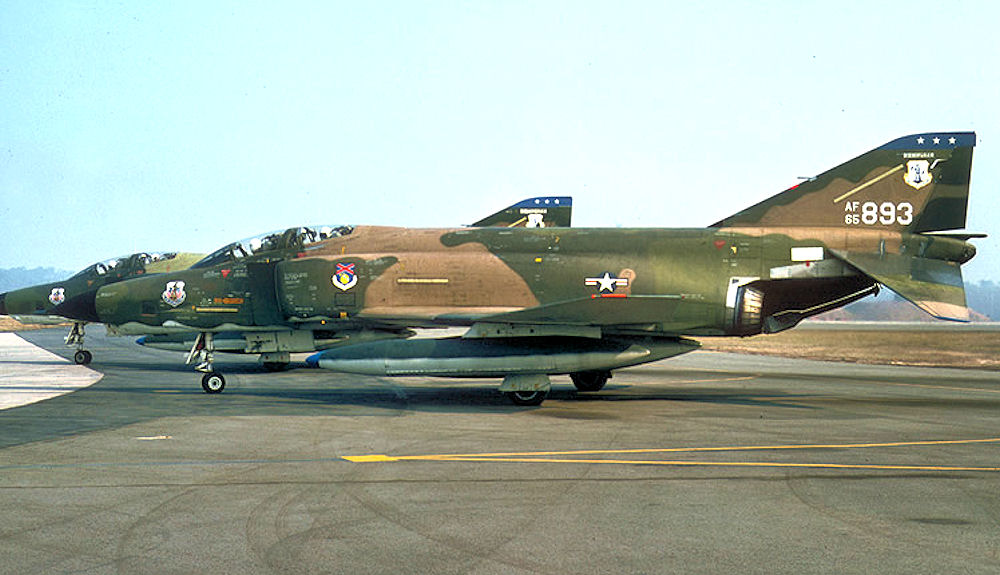
106th TRS RF-4C Phantom II aircraft at Ramstein AB, West Germany, March 1976. Aircraft were participating in "Operation Coronet Sprint". McDonnell RF-4C-26-MC Phantom 65-0893 visible in foreground.

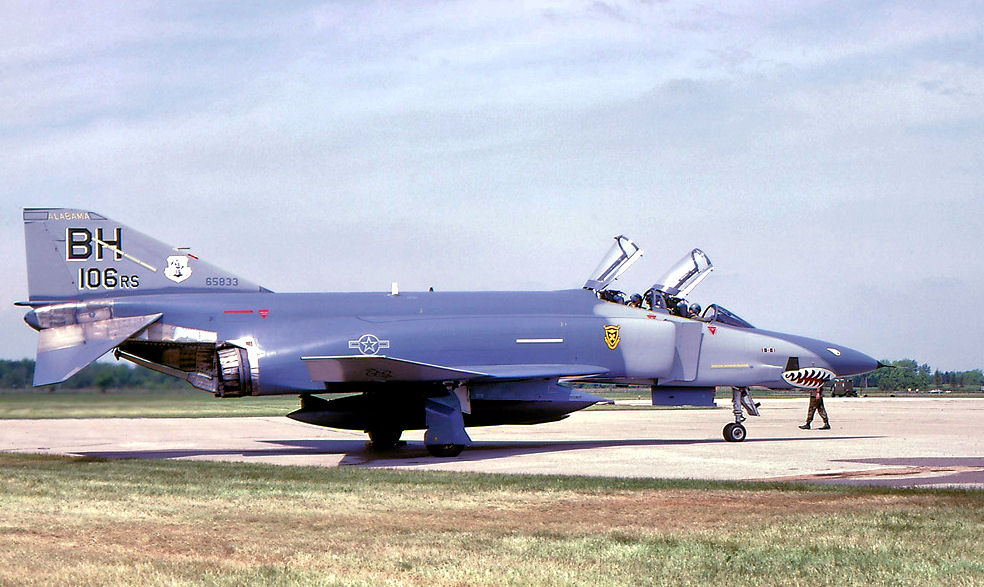
106th Reconnaissance Squadron McDonnell RF-4C-24-MC Phantom 65-0833 in late-1980s camouflage motif. Aircraft retired in 1993, now on static display at Jasper, AL VFW post.

At Nellis AFB, sixty-seven members of the 106th TRS obtained realistic combat training against the 64th Tactical Fighter Training Aggressor Squadron, equipped with F-5E Tiger II aggressor aircraft which simulated Soviet Air Force MiG-21 air defense fighters.

Many awards were earned by the 117th; for having the best National Guard Publication; for achieving flying milestones; for service to the United States Secret Service; and for outstanding accomplishments on Operational Readiness Inspections. The 117th also earned awards for having the best ANG flying unit in the United States.

==== Operation Desert Shield ====
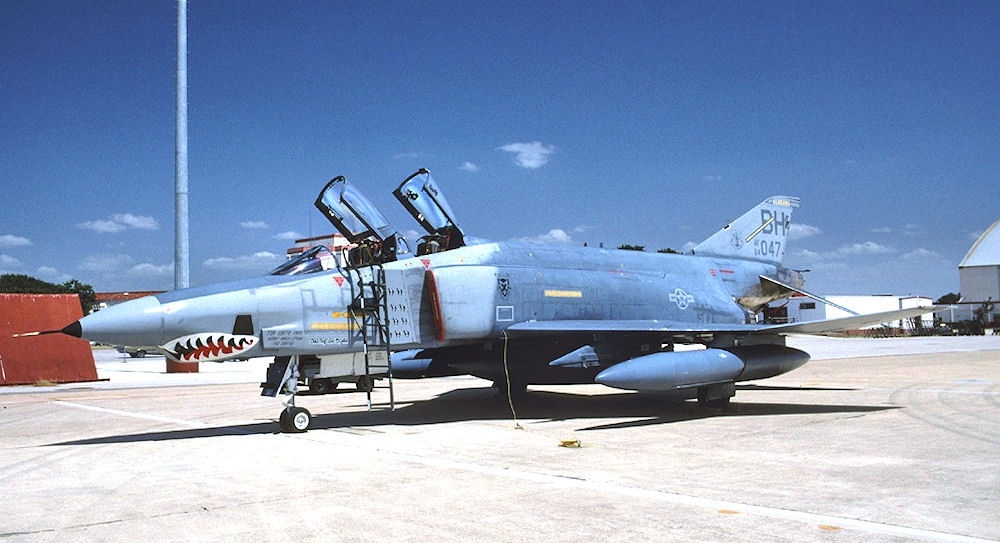
106th TRS RF-4C Phantom II 64-1047, shown at Shaikh Isa Air Base, Bahrain during Operation Desert Shield. Note the numerous "camels", painted on its intake, representing the number of missions flown. 1047 Flew 172 sorties in Desert Shield. After its retirement in May 1994, the aircraft was flown to Wright-Patterson AFB, Ohio where today it is on permanent display at the National Museum of the United States Air Force. It had more than 7,300 hours of flying time.

By early 1989, the operational lifetime of the F-4 Phantom was ending, and the number of RF-4C squadrons serving both on active-duty as well as in Air National Guard units was being reduced. In large part, the RF-4C was being replaced by the ability of the Lockheed U-2 TR-1A and TR-1B variant, which had taken over the tactical reconnaissance mission. The collapse of the Soviet Union and the dissolution of the Warsaw Pact led to accelerated retirement plans, and the retirement of the last of the RF-4Cs was in the planning stages when Iraq invaded Kuwait in August 1990, and further inactivation plans were put on hold. Consequently, the RF-4C was still in service with the USAF at the time of Operation Desert Shield.

When the United States military build-up in the Middle East began following Saddam Hussein's 2 August 1990 invasion of Kuwait, six RF-4Cs of the 117th TRW equipped with a camera upgrade called the HIAC-1 LOROP (Long Range Oblique Photography) deployed on 24 August 1990 to Al Dhafra Air Base, United Arab Emirates. Their journey to the war zone may have been the longest nonstop flight made by operational warplanes at that time, requiring 16 air-to-air refuelings and spanning 8,000 nautical miles in 15.5 hours. Initially assigned to HQ United States Central Command Air Forces, the 106th TRS was later further assigned to the 35th Tactical Fighter Wing (Provisional).

LOROP was capable of high-resolution images of objects 100 miles away using a high-resolution 66-inch focal length camera that was carried in a centerline pod underneath the aircraft. It was used to conduct prewar surveillance and photo-reconnaissance mapping of Iraqi forces in occupied Kuwait as well as those deployed along the Saudi Arabia-Iraq border. In support of RF-4C operations, numerous airmen and aircraft were used, among them C-21 Learjets, to move finished imagery around the theater. In the Combined Air Operations Center (CAOC) in Riyadh, Saudi Arabia known as the "Black Hole," coalition air commander Lt. Gen. (later Gen.) Charles "Chuck" Horner scrutinized the RF-4C images of Iraq's forces every day.

Unfortunately, 64-1044 crewed by Major Barry K. Henderson and Lt. Col. Stephen G. Schraam was lost in an operational accident on 8 October 1990.

The 106th TRS, however, did not engage in combat operations during Operation Desert Storm, being relieved on 18 December 1990 by the 192d Tactical Reconnaissance Squadron of the Nevada ANG. Later, RF-4Cs taken from the USAF's 12th TRS/67th TRW and the 38th TRS/26th TRW were deployed and were engaged in combat during Desert Storm.

==== Air Refueling ====
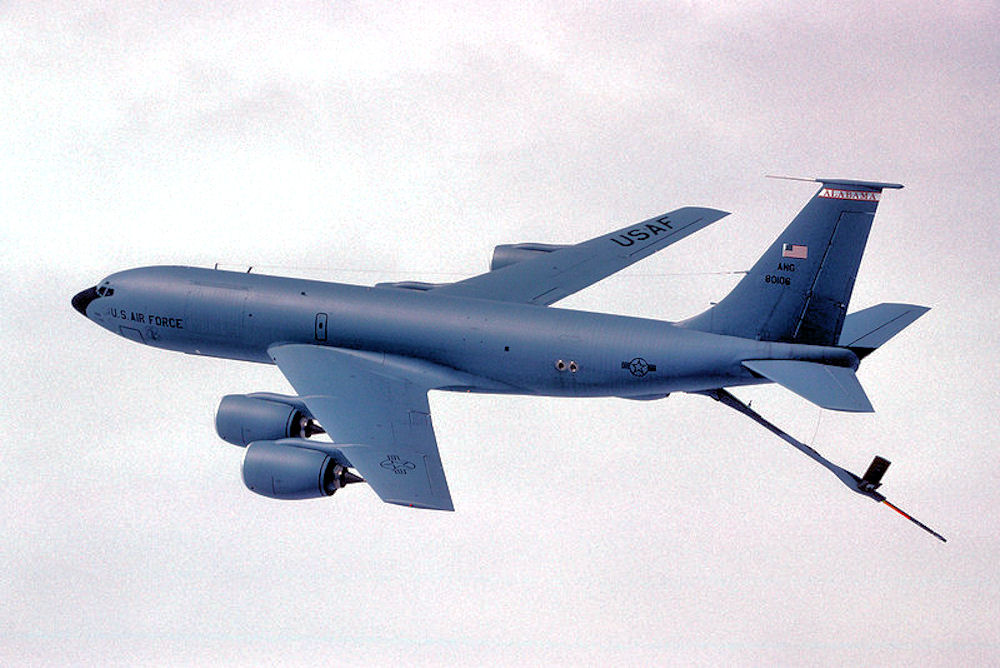
106th Air Refueling Squadron KC-135 Stratotanker

After the end of Desert Storm, the phaseout of the RF-4C with the ANG was accelerated. On 16 March 1992 the 117th Tactical Reconnaissance Wing adopted the USAF "objective wing" and was re-designated the 117th Reconnaissance Wing; on 1 June 1992 Tactical Air Command was inactivated, being replaced by the new Air Combat Command (ACC). During 1994 the RF-4Cs were sent to Davis-Monthan AFB, Arizona for retirement at AMARC. On 1 October the 117th Reconnaissance Wing was re-designated as the 117th Air Refueling Wing, the mission now becoming aerial refueling with KC-135 Stratotankers, the first tanker arriving later that month.

After the 9/11 attacks on the United States, the 117th ARW was deployed to MacDill AFB, Florida and began refueling F-15 and F-16 aircraft flying Combat Air Patrol missions over major cities in the Southeastern United States as part of Operation Noble Eagle.

In its 2005 BRAC Recommendations, DoD recommended closing the 117th ARW and reassigning its aircraft to other National Guard units. This decision was ultimately reversed.

=== Lineage ===
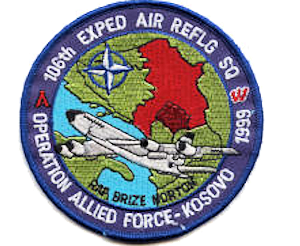
Patch from the 106th Expeditionary Air Refueling Squadron. Note: The unit consists of the 106th Air Refueling Squadron and the 126th Air Refueling Squadron from Wisconsin, hence the A and W on the patch.

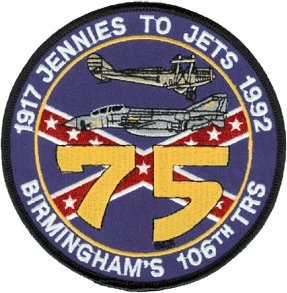
1992 75th Anniversary Squadron patch

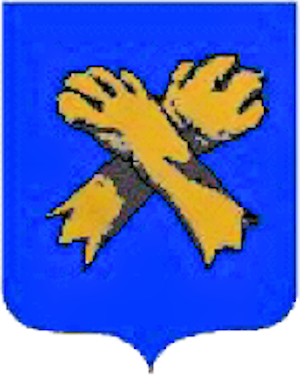
Emblem of the World War II 106th Bombardment Squadron

- Organized as 106th Aero Squadron** on 27 August 1917

Re-designated 106th Aero Squadron (Repair) on 1 September 1917
Re-designated 800th Aero Squadron (Repair) on 1 February 1918.
Demobilized: A and B flights on 8 May 1919, C flight on 2 July 1919

- Constituted in the Alabama NG in 1921 as the 135th Squadron (Observation)

Organized as the 135th Squadron (Observation) on 21 January 1922 with personnel from the "Birmingham Escadrille" (a civilian flying club organized in 1919 by World War I ace Maj. James A. Meissner)
Extended federal recognition on 21 January 1922
Re-designated as the 135th Observation Squadron on 25 January 1923
Re-designated as the 114th Observation Squadron on 1 May 1923
Re-designated as the 106th Observation Squadron on 16 January 1924

- Consolidated and reconstituted on 20 October 1936 with the World War I 106th Aero Squadron

Ordered to active service on 25 November 1940
Re-designated: 106th Observation Squadron (Medium) on 13 January 1942
Re-designated: 106th Observation Squadron on 4 July 1942
Re-designated: 106th Reconnaissance Squadron (Bombardment) on 2 April 1943
Re-designated: 100th Bombardment Squadron (Medium) on 9 May 1944
Inactivated on 11 December 1945

- Re-designated: 106th Bombardment Squadron (Light), and allotted to Alabama Air National Guard, on 24 May 1946.

Extended federal recognition on 25 November 1946
Re-designated: 106th Tactical Reconnaissance Squadron (Night Photo) on 1 February 1951
Federalized and ordered to active service on: 1 April 1951
Re-designated: 106th Tactical Reconnaissance Squadron on 9 January 1952
Relieved from active duty and returned to Alabama State Control: 15 November 1952
Re-designated: 106th Tactical Reconnaissance Squadron on 1 May 1957
Federalized and ordered to active service on: 3 November 1961
Relieved from active duty and returned to Alabama State Control: on 20 August 1962
Federalized and ordered to active service on: 24 August 1990
Elements operated as: 106th Tactical Fighter Squadron (Provisional), 24 August-18 December 1990
Relieved from active duty and returned to Alabama State Control: on 18 December 1990
Re-designated: 106th Reconnaissance Squadron on 15 March 1992
Re-designated: 106th Air Refueling Squadron in Oct 1994

- Designated: 106th Expeditionary Air Refueling Squadron when unit assigned to Air and Space Expeditionary Forces.

** This unit is not related to another 106th Aero Squadron (Service) that was activated in March 1918 at Rich Field, Waco, Texas.

=== Assignments ===
- Post Headquarters, Kelly Field, 27 August 1917
- Replacement Concentration Center, AEF, 2 January-28 February 1918
- Headquarters, Chief of Air Service, AEF, 28 February 1918 – 1919

Detached to French Army service entire period

Second Artillery Aerial Observation School, February 1918 – April 1919

B flight with First Artillery Aerial Observation School, 1918, and detachment thereof with Fourth Artillery Aerial Observation School, 1918
C flight with Fifth Artillery Aerial Observation School, 1918–1919

- Post Headquarters, Mitchel Field, c. 28 April-8 May 1919, c. 21 June-2 July 1919
- Alabama National Guard, 1921

12th Observation Group (IV Corps), 1921
39th Division, 1 May 1923
31st Division, 16 January 1924
Relieved from assignment to the 31st Division; attached to the 31st Division for command and control purposes, 15 February 1929
44th Observation Group (IV Corps), 1 October 1933

- Fourth Corps Area, 25 November 1940
- IV Army Corps, c. December 1940
- 66th Observation (later Reconnaissance) Group 1 September 1941
- 76th Reconnaissance Group, 20 June 1943
- Third Air Force, 13 Ju1 1943
- III Reconnaissance Command, 23 August 1943
- Thirteenth Air Force, 19 November 1943
- 42d Bombardment Group, attached in January 1944 and assigned 1 February-11 December 1945
- 54th Fighter Wing, 25 November 1946
- 117th Fighter Group, 1 October 1947
- 117th Tactical Reconnaissance Group, 1 November 1950
- 363d Tactical Reconnaissance Wing, 1 April 1951
- 117th Tactical Reconnaissance Wing, 15 November 1952

Attached to: 7117th Tactical Reconnaissance Wing, 3 November 1961 – 20 August 1962

- 117th Tactical Reconnaissance Wing, 9 December 1974

Attached to: 35th Tactical Fighter Wing (Provisional), 24 August 1990 – 18 December 1990

- 117th Reconnaissance Wing, 15 March 1992
- 117th Air Refueling Wing, 1 October 1994 – present

=== Stations ===
- Kelly Field, Texas, 27 August 1917
- St. Maixent Replacement Barracks, France, 2 January 1918
- Champ de Tir de Souge, France, 28 February 1918 – April 1919

B flight at Camp de Coetquidan, Morbihan, France, 1 March-28 October 1918

Detachment thereof at Camp de Meucon, Morbihan, France, May–October 1918

C flight at Le Valdahon, France, 2 March 1918-c. May 1919

- Mitchel Field, New York, A and B flights, c. 28 April-8 May 1919, C flight, c. 21 June-2 July 1919
- Roberts Field, Birmingham, Alabama, 21 January 1922
- Birmingham Municipal Airport, Alabama, December 1936
- 36th Street Airport, Miami, Florida, c. 14 December 1941
- Imeson Field, Florida, 14 March 1942
- Hunter Army Airfield, Georgia, May 1942
- William Northern Field, Tennessee, c. 8 September 1942
- Morris Field, North Carolina, November 1942
- Fort Myers Army Airfield Florida, December 1942
- Morris Field, North Carolina, 2 February 1943
- Camp Campbell, Kentucky, 3 April 1943
- Chatham Field, Georgia, 23 June-15 October 1943
- Carney Airfield, Guadalcanal, Solomon Islands, 15 November 1943

Operated through Russell Islands, January 1944

- Stirling Island, Solomon Islands, 25 January 1944

Operated from Hollandia Airfield Complex, Netherlands East Indies, 6 August-14 September 1944

- Sansapor Airfield, Netherlands East Indies, 24 August 1944

Operated from: Wama Airfield, Morotai, Netherlands East Indies, 22 February-22 March 1945

- Puerto Princesa Airfield, Palawan, Philippines, 15 March–November 1945
- Camp Stoneman, California, c.9-ii December 1945
- Birmingham MAP (Sumpter Smith Field, later ANGB), Alabama, 25 November 1946 – present

Operated from: Shaw AFB, South Carolina, 5 January 1952 – 1 January 1953
Operated from: Dreux-Louvilliers AB, France, 22 November 8 December 1961
Operated from: Chaumont-Semoutiers AB, France, 8 December 1961 – 22 July 1962
Operated from: Sheik Isa AB, Bahrain, 24 August-18 December 1990
Operated from: Istres AB, France, Jun 1995, Jan 1998, Aug 2000, Mar 2001
Operated from: Pisa Airport, Italy, Nov 1995, 1 Nov-3 Dec 1996
Operated from: NAS Keflavik, Iceland, 15 Feb-24 Mar 1996, April 1999
Operated from: Rhein-Main AB, Germany, Mar 1999
Operated from: RAF Brize Norton, United Kingdom, 4 May 1999
Operated from: Incirlik AB, Turkey, 17 October 2001

=== Aircraft ===
- JN-4, JN-6, DH-4, TW-3, PT-1, BT-1, 0-2, 0-11, and 0-17 during period 1922–1933
- Douglas O-38, 1933–1941
- North American O-47, 1938–1942
- O-49 Vigilant, 1941–1942
- A-20 Havoc, 1941–1942
- P-39 Airacobra, 1941–1942
- P-40 Warhawk, 1941–1942
- P-43 Lancer, 1942
- Douglas O-46, 1942
- B-25 Mitchell, 1943–1945
- B-26B/C Invader, 1946–1951
- RB-26C Invader, 1951–1957
- RF-84F Thunderstreak, 1957–1971
- RF-4C Phantom II, 1971–1994
- KC-135R Stratotanker, 1994 – present

== See also ==
- List of American aero squadrons
- List of observation squadrons of the United States Army National Guard
