= 179th Cyberspace Wing =

179th Cyberspace Wing

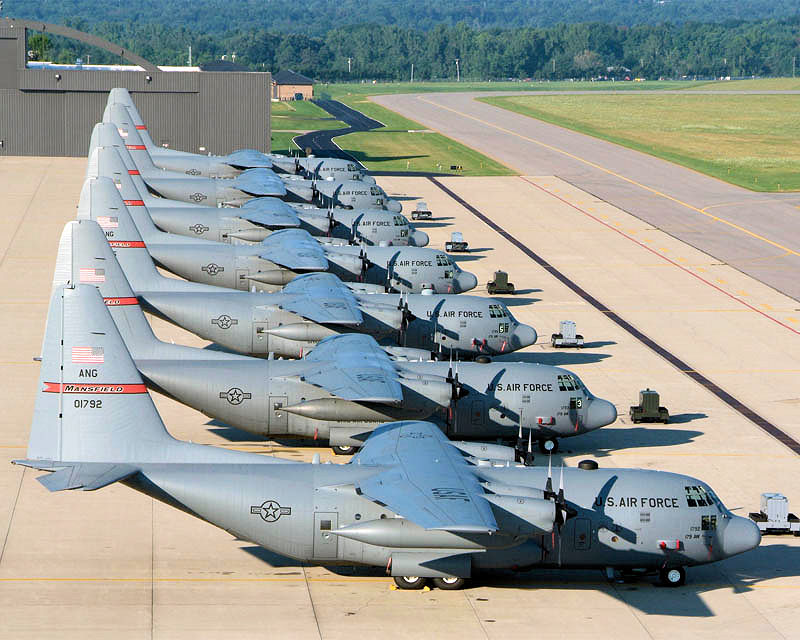
- 179th Airlift Wing C-130H Hercules on the flight line in Mansfield, Ohio
- Active: 1962–present
- Country: United States
- Allegiance: Ohio
- Branch: Air National Guard
- Type: Wing
- Role: Information Warfare
- Size: 900+
- Part of: Ohio Air National Guard
- Garrison/HQ: Mansfield Lahm Air National Guard Base, Mansfield, Ohio
- Nickname: Mansfield's Air Guard
- Motto: Ad Pulsum Parati (Latin for 'Ready for the Attack')
- Decorations: Air Force Outstanding Unit Award

Commanders
- Wing Commander: Colonel Darren Hamilton
- Deputy Wing Commander: Colonel Kenneth Kmetz

Insignia
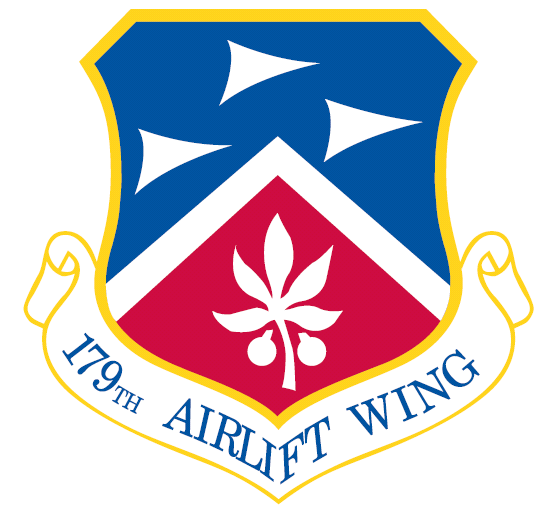
- 179th Cyberspace Wing emblem

The 179th Cyberspace Wing is a unit of the Ohio Air National Guard, stationed at Mansfield Lahm Air National Guard Base, Mansfield, Ohio. If activated to federal service with the United States Air Force, the Wing is gained by Air Combat Command.

== Mission ==
The 179th provides information operations and engineering infrastructure for air, space, and cyberspace military operations. It supports domestic operations and multi-domain outcomes against "Great Power Competition."

== Units ==
The 179th Airlift Wing consisted of the following units:

- 179th Operations Group

164th Airlift Squadron
179th Operational Support Squadron

- 179th Maintenance Group

179th Maintenance Squadron
179th Aircraft Maintenance Squadron
179th Maintenance Operations Flight

- 179th Mission Support Group

179th Logistics Readiness Squadron
179th Force Support Squadron
179th Civil Engineering Squadron
179th Security Forces Squadron
179th Communications Flight

- 179th Medical Group
- 200th RED HORSE Squadron

== History ==
On 15 October 1962, the Ohio Air National Guard's 164th Tactical Fighter Squadron was authorized to expand to a group level and the 179th Tactical Fighter Group was established by the National Guard Bureau, with the 164th Squadron becoming the group's flying squadron. Other squadrons assigned into the group were the 179th Headquarters, 179th Material Squadron (Maintenance), 179th Combat Support Squadron, and the 179th USAF Dispensary.

=== Tactical Air Command ===
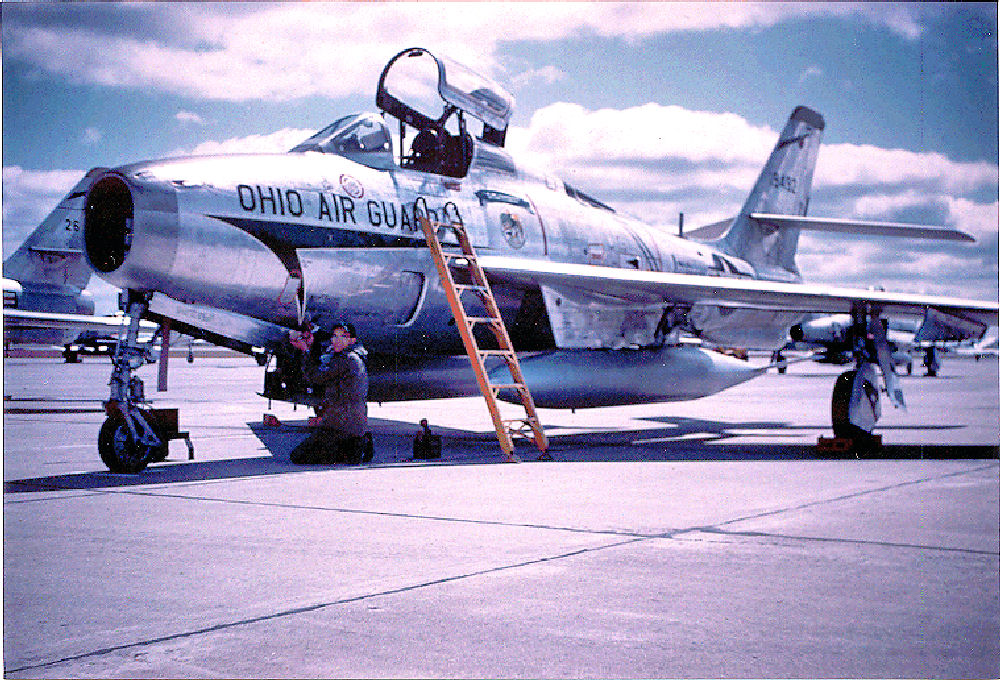
179th TFG F-84F Thunderstreak, AF Ser. No. 51-9432

Equipped with F-84F Thunderstreaks, the new group was assigned to the Ohio ANG 121st Tactical Fighter Wing at Lockbourne AFB, Ohio. The 179th TFG was tasked with a tactical fighter-bomber mission to augment the Tactical Air Command (TAC).

The squadron continued normal peacetime training throughout the 1960s. Individual squadron members volunteered for duty during the Vietnam War, however the 164th was not federalized in 1968 as the F-84Fs were not considered front line combat aircraft. In February 1972, the squadron retired its Thunderstreaks and converted to the F-100 Super Sabre as a result of the American draw-down from the Vietnam War.

==== Tactical Airlift ====
The squadron flew the F-100s until the winter of 1976 when the 179th was transferred from Tactical Air Command to Military Airlift Command (MAC) on 5 January. At this time, the unit converted to the C-130B Hercules and received a complement of eight aircraft. With the change of equipment, the unit was designated a Tactical Airlift Group. Upgrade to the C-130H was completed in 1991.

The 179th Airlift Group was active during 1991 Gulf War providing airlift support throughout the Continental United States and Europe. Portions of the 179th were activated during Desert Shield/Storm and served in the US, Europe and Saudi Arabia.

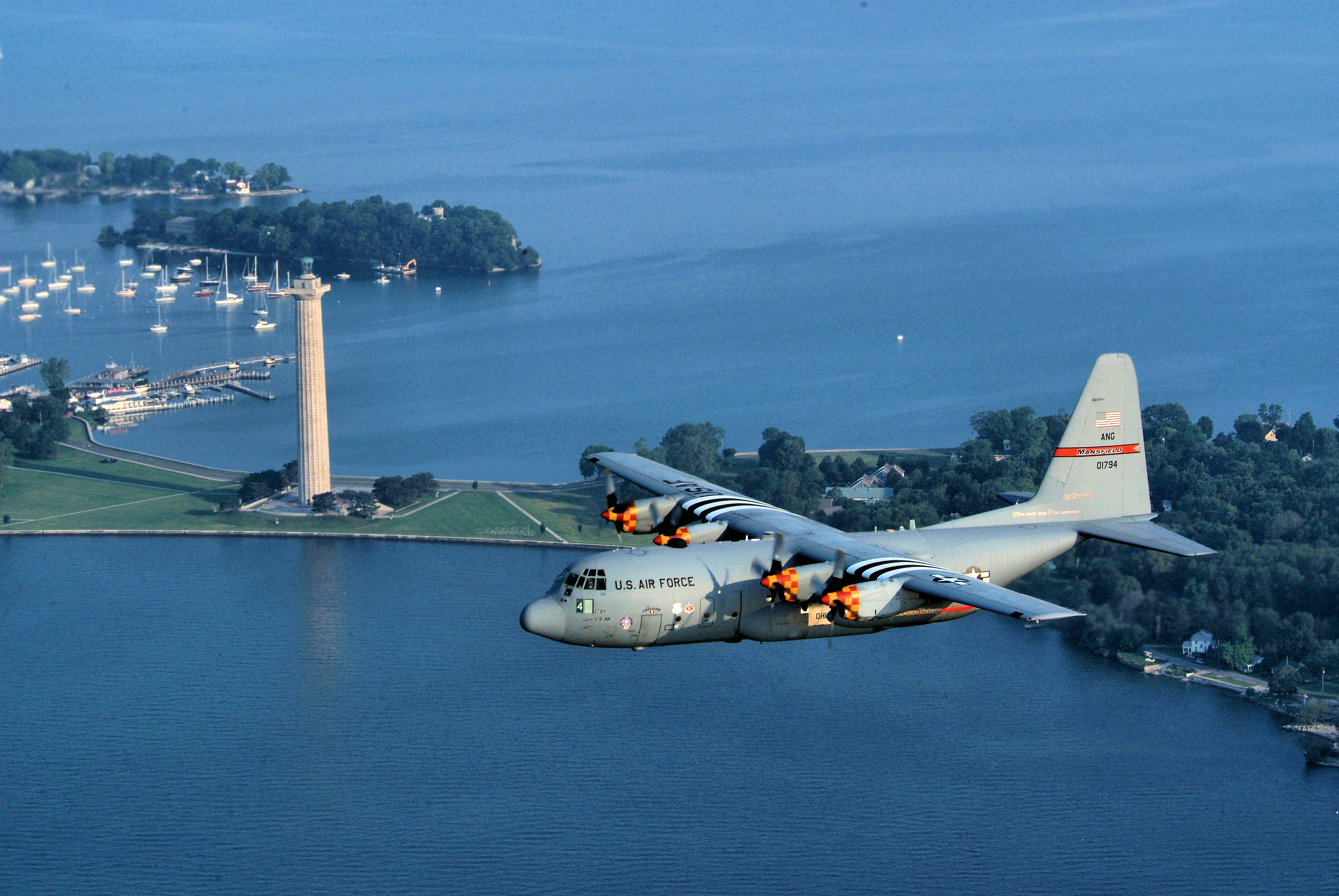
179 AW C-130H, AF Ser. No. 90-1794, flying past the Perry's Victory Memorial, 2008.

In March 1992, the 179th adopted the USAF Objective Wing organization and became simply the 179th Airlift Group and the 164th, the 164th Airlift Squadron. On 1 June of that year, Military Airlift Command was inactivated as part of the Air Force restructuring after the end of the Cold War. Air Mobility Command (AMC) initially became the gaining major command for the 179th, although on 1 October 1993, it was moved to ACC along with the other C-130 units.

With the Air National Guard in the post-Cold War era providing nearly 50% of the USAF's tactical airlift capability, the 179th Airlift Group supported combat and humanitarian operations and exercises around the world, beginning in July 1992 as part of Operation Provide Promise; a humanitarian relief operation in Bosnia and Herzegovina during the Yugoslav War. Ongoing until 1996 airlift units delivered food, medicine, and supplies and evacuating over 1,300 wounded people from the region. It the longest running humanitarian airlift in history.

In late 1992, the 179th began airlifting personnel, equipment and supplies to Somalia as part of Operation Restore Hope. The Air Force enlisted Air National Guard units being charged with carrying out United Nations Security Council Resolution 794: to create a protected environment for conducting humanitarian operations in the southern half of Somalia.

The 179th was also engaged in Operation Uphold Democracy (19 September 1994 – 31 March 1995) providing airlift support to United States military forces in Hati during its military intervention designed to remove the military regime installed by the 1991 Haitian coup d'état that overthrew the elected President Jean-Bertrand Aristide.

On 11 October 1995, in accordance with the Air Force One Base-One Wing directive, the 179th Airlift Group was expanded and changed in status to the 179th Airlift Wing. Under the Objective Wing organization, the 164th Airlift Squadron was assigned to the 179th Operations Group. Support groups to the wing were the 179th Maintenance Group, 179th Mission Support Group and the 179th Medical Group.

In mid-1996, the Air Force, in response to budget cuts, and changing world situations, began experimenting with Air Expeditionary organizations. The Air Expeditionary Force concept was developed that would mix Active Duty Regular Air Force, Air Force Reserve and Air National Guard elements into a combined force. Instead of entire permanent units deploying as "Provisional" as in the 1991 Gulf War, Expeditionary units are composed of "aviation packages" from several wings, including active duty Air Force, the Air Force Reserve Command and the Air National Guard, would be married together to carry out the assigned deployment rotation.

In December 1996, the 164th Expeditionary Airlift Squadron (164 EAS) was first formed from 179th personnel and aircraft and deployed to Pisa Airport, Italy in support of Operation Joint Guard. It assisted in providing logistical support to NATO-led multinational peacekeeping force in Bosnia and Herzegovina which was tasked with upholding the Dayton Peace Agreement. This ongoing commitment continued until 1998. Other Air Expeditionary Force deployments in the late 1990s included Operation Joint Endeavor, Operation Joint Forge and Operation Shining Hope, all addressing the Yugoslavian crises of the era.

==== After September 11 ====
After the events of 11 September 2001 the 164th Expeditionary Airlift Squadron has been activated on several occasions, initially providing logistic support for Air Force fighter squadrons engaged in Combat Air Patrols over major cities during Operation Noble Eagle in late 2001 and 2002. The EAS has seen duty in Afghanistan as part of Operation Enduring Freedom and Iraq as part of Operation Iraqi Freedom.

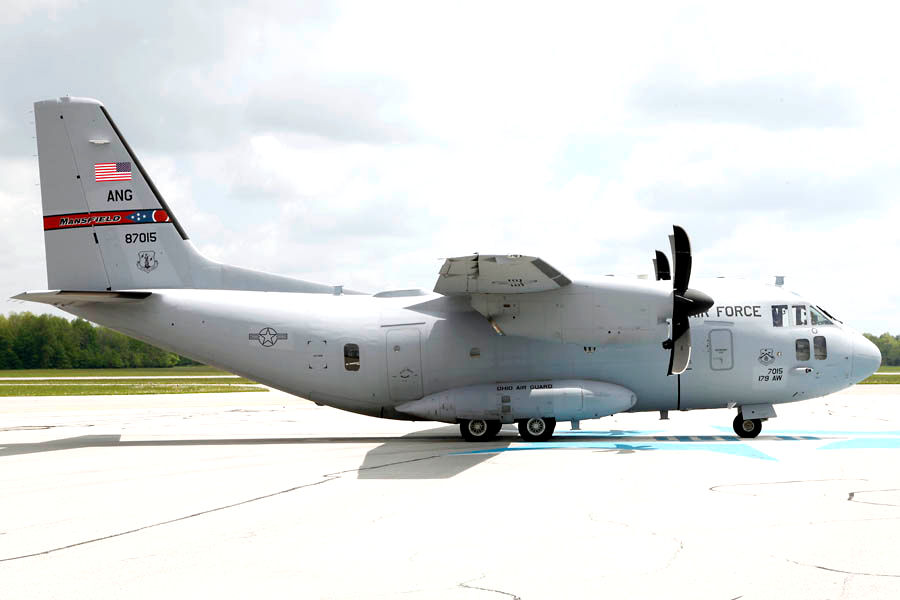
164th Airlift Squadron C-27J Spartan, AF Ser. No. 08-7015

Pursuant to 2005 BRAC Recommendations, DoD recommended to close Mansfield-Lahm Municipal Airport Air National Guard Station, Ohio. The 179th Airlift Squadron would distribute its eight C-130H aircraft to the Air Force Reserve Command's 908th Airlift Wing at Maxwell AFB, Alabama (four aircraft), and the active duty Air Force's 314th Airlift Wing at Little Rock Air Force Base, Arkansas (four aircraft). Flying-related expeditionary combat support would moves to the Kentucky Air National Guard's 123rd Airlift Wing at Louisville Air National Guard Base, Kentucky (aerial port) and the Ohio Air National Guard's 180th Fighter Wing at Toledo Air National Guard Base, Ohio (fire fighters). However, due to the base's superior record and recommendations for reconsideration by state and local officials, the base was incorporated into the Ohio Air National Guard's future by receiving a bridge mission of flying the C-21 Learjet operational support airlift aircraft mission until it became operational in the C-27J Spartan.

On 20 July 2008, the 179th continued its growth by the standing up of the 200th Red Horse (Rapid Engineer Deployable Heavy Operational Repair Squadron Engineers) detachment. The Mansfield base has been assigned with 200 RED HORSE personnel and another 200 assigned to Port Clinton. A new building across the airfield was to be constructed to house the detachment with an approximated completion date in 2010.

The 179 AW, along with the 175th Wing of the Maryland Air National Guard, was the first unit to train and deploy the C-27J Spartan in 2010. Airmen from the 179th Airlift Wing made Air National Guard history 26 July 2011, by deploying in support of Operation Enduring Freedom for the first time with the C-27J Spartan, one of the Air Force's newest aircraft. This joint mission was conducted with aircrew from the 164th Airlift Squadron, a subordinate unit of the 179th Airlift Wing, and Soldiers from the Oklahoma and Georgia Army National Guard, working in conjunction with the 159th Combat Aviation Brigade (159th CAB), from Fort Campbell, Kentucky, in direct support of the U.S. Army for airlift and airdrop operations. The 179 AW made history with a nine-month overseas rotation, as opposed to the typical four-to-six-month Air National Guard deployment schedule. Due to budget constrained force structure changes within the Air Force eliminating all C-27s, the 179 AW's C-27s were retired and the 179th began transitioning back to the C-130 in May 2013.

==== Transition to Cyberspace Wing ====
In September 2021, the U.S. Air Force announced that Mansfield Air National Guard Base was selected to be the location for the first Cyberspace Wing in the Air National Guard. Divestment of the Wing's C-130s was completed in June 2022 and the unit was officially designated as the 179th Cyberspace Wing in September 2023, with new Cyber Operations groups and squadrons being stood up at that time. As a part of this transition, the Wing was transferred from Air Mobility Command to Air Combat Command supervision.

=== Lineage ===
- Designated as the 179th Tactical Fighter Group, and allotted to the ANG, in 1962

Activated and extended federal recognition on 15 October 1962
Redesignated 179th Tactical Airlift Group, 5 January 1976
Redesignated 179th Airlift Group, 15 Mar 1992
Redesignated 179th Airlift Wing, 11 October 1995
Redesignated 179th Cyberspace Wing, 9 September 2023

=== Assignments ===
- 121st Tactical Fighter Wing, 15 October 1962
- 121st Air Refueling Wing, 16 January 1993
- Ohio Air National Guard, 11 October 1995

Gained by: Air Combat Command, 1 October 1993 – 31 March 1997
Gained by: Air Mobility Command, 1 June 1992 – 1 October 1993; 1 April 1997 – 8 September 2023
Gained by: Air Combat Command, 9 September 2023 - Present

=== Components ===
- 179th Operations Group, 11 October 1995 – 8 September 2023
- 164th Tactical Fighter Squadron (later 164th Tactical Airlift Squadron, 164th Airlift Squadron), 15 October 1962 – 11 October 1995

=== Stations ===
- Mansfield Lahm Regional Airport, Ohio, 15 October 1962

Designated: Mansfield Lahm Air National Guard Base, 1991-Present

=== Aircraft ===
- F-84F Thunderstreak, 1962–1972
- F-100D/F Super Sabre, 1972–1976
- C-130B Hercules, 1976–1991
- C-27J Spartan, 2010–2013
- C-130H Hercules, 1991–2010, 2013–2022

=== Decorations ===
- Air Force Outstanding Unit Award
- Outstanding Ohio Air National Guard Unit
- Outstanding Air National Guard Airlift/Tanker unit
- Maj Gen John T. Pesch Flight Safety Award
- Air National Guard Comptroller Organization of the Year
- MAC Outstanding Intelligence Branch of the Year
- Air National Guard Maintenance Effectiveness Award
- First runner-up, 21st Air Force Outstanding Reserve Forces Unit
