= 121st Air Refueling Wing =

121st Air Refueling Wing

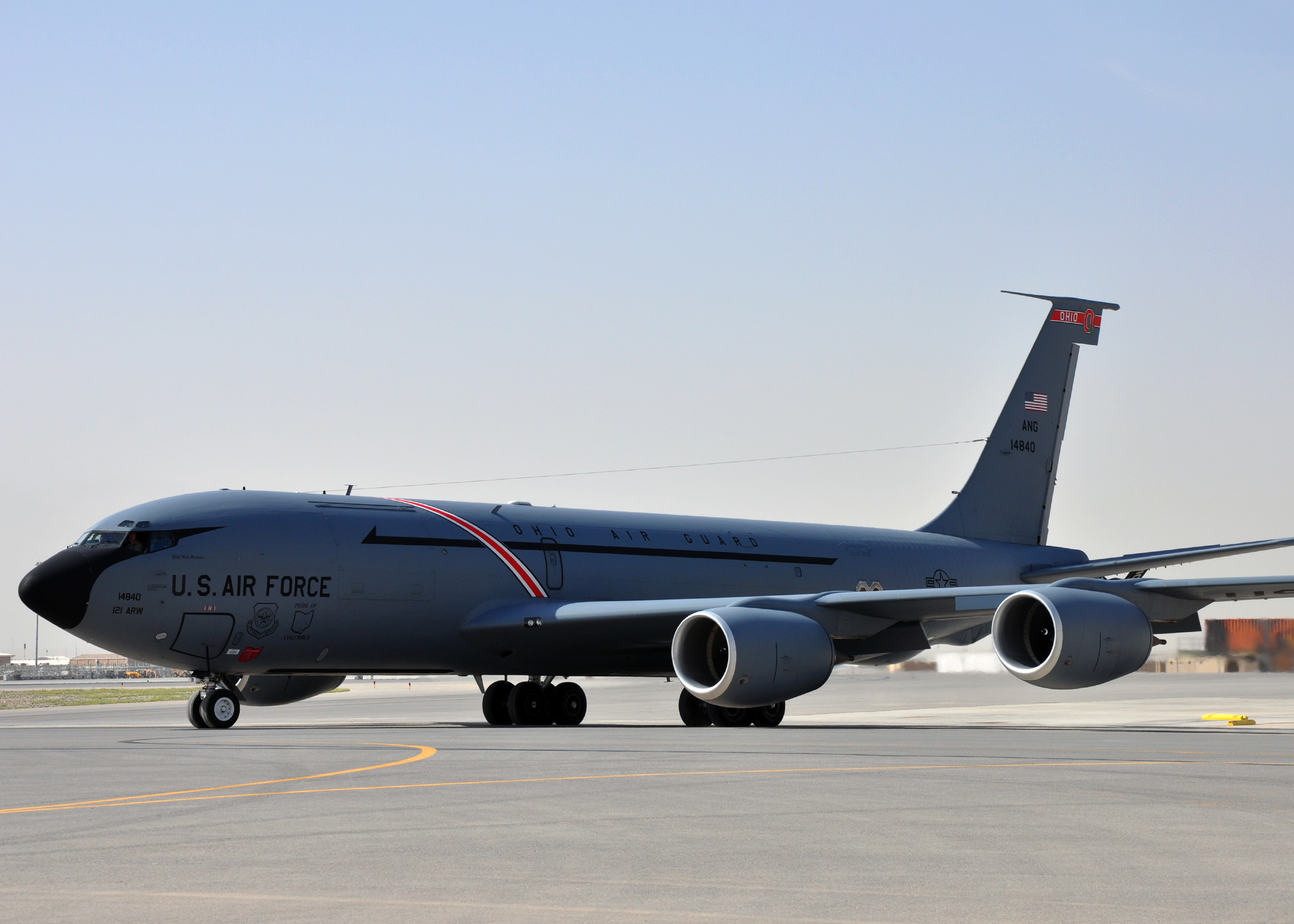
- Ohio ANG 121st ARW Boeing KC-135R Stratotanker at Kandahar International Airport in 2019
- Active: 1950–present
- Country: United States
- Branch: Air National Guard
- Role: Aerial refueling
- Part of: Ohio Air National Guard
- Garrison/HQ: Rickenbacker Air National Guard Base, Columbus, Ohio
- Motto: All Things at All Times

Insignia
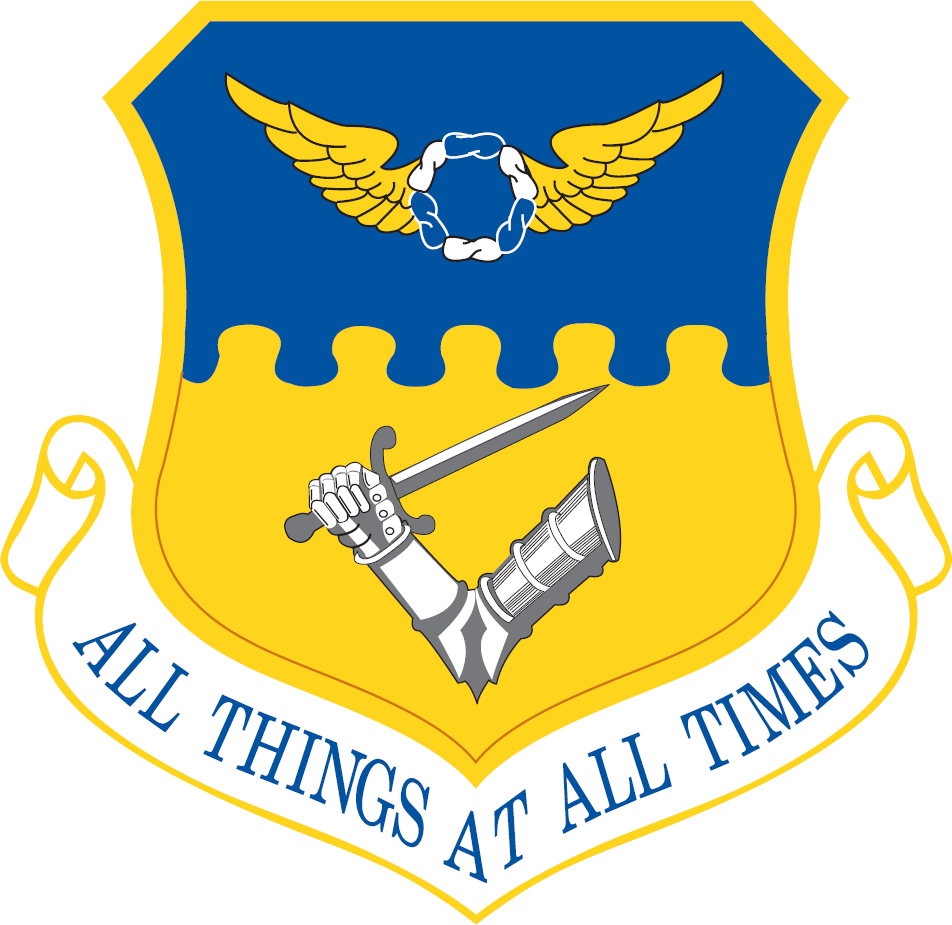
- 121st Air Refueling Wing emblem

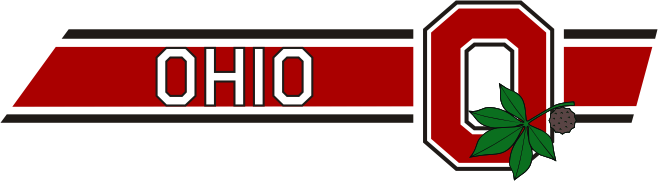
- Tail stripe

The 121st Air Refueling Wing is a unit of the Ohio Air National Guard, stationed at Rickenbacker Air National Guard Base, Columbus, Ohio. If activated to federal service, the wing is gained by the United States Air Force (USAF) Air Mobility Command.

== Mission ==
The 121st Air Refueling Wing's Boeing KC-135 Stratotanker mission is to provide the core aerial refueling capability for the USAF and the Air National Guard. This unique aircraft enhances the Air Force's capability to accomplish its primary missions of Global Reach and Global Power. It also provides aerial refueling support to U.S. Navy, U.S. Marine Corps, and allied nation aircraft. The KC-135 is capable of transporting litter and ambulatory patients using patient support pallets during aeromedical evacuations.

== Units ==
The 121st Air Refueling Wing consists of the following units:

- 121st Operations Group
  - 166th Air Refueling Squadron
- 121st Maintenance Group
- 121st Mission Support Group
- 121st Medical Group

== History ==
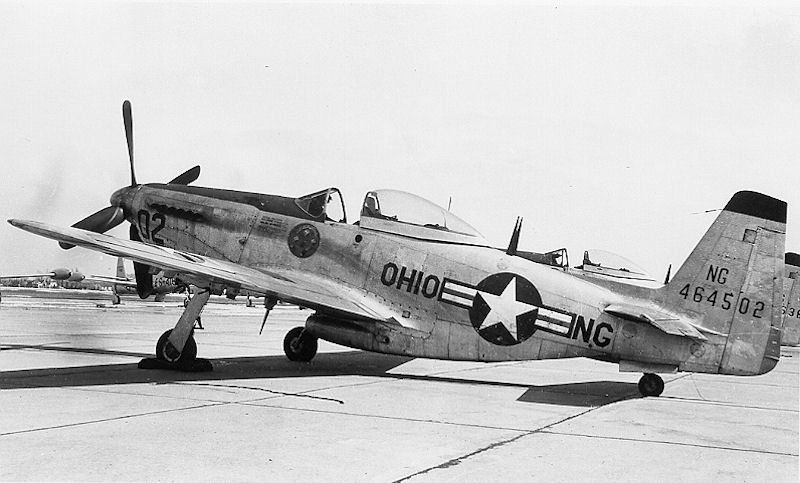
164th FS P-51H Mustang 44-64502

In the fall of 1950, the National Guard reorganized its operational groups along the Wing Base organization used by the regular Air Force. This placed the operational groups, along with their supporting units under a single wing. On 31 October 1950 the 121st Fighter Wing was activated, drawing personnel from the 55th Fighter Wing, which was simultaneously inactivated. The 121st Fighter Group and its squadrons were assigned to the new wing. The 112th Bombardment Squadron (Light) at Cleveland Municipal Airport was transferred from the 55th Wing and directly assigned directly to the wing. The 112th flew the RB-26C Invader.

=== Korean War federalization ===
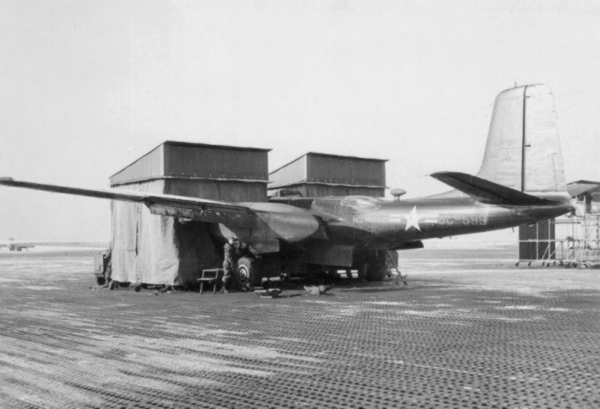
Douglas RB-26C-40-DT Invader serial 44-35599 of the 112th Tactical Reconnaissance Squadron in a temporary wooden nose "hangar", January 1953. Notice the temporary Marston Mat used for the parking apron with the snow and ice.

With the surprise invasion of South Korea on 25 June 1950, and the regular military's complete lack of readiness, most of the Air National Guard was federalized placed on active duty.

- The 112th Bombardment Squadron was federalized on 10 October 1950. It was re-designated as the 112th Tactical Reconnaissance Squadron and assigned to the federalized Alabama ANG 117th Tactical Reconnaissance Group. It deployed to West Germany and later France to reinforce the United States Air Forces in Europe (USAFE). It was released from active duty on 9 July 1952 and returned to Ohio without aircraft or equipment, which was transferred to USAFE.
- The 162d Fighter Squadron was not federalized and remained at Cox-Dayton Municipal Airport and continued its air defense mission.
- The 164th Fighter Squadron was federalized on 10 February 1951. The 164th however was selected to remain at Mansfield Lahm Regional Airport and continue the air defense mission, being operationally gained by the Eastern Air Defense Force, Air Defense Command. The squadron was released from federal service and returned to Ohio State control.
- The 166th Fighter Squadron was federalized on 10 February 1951 and assigned to the federalized Indiana ANG 122d Fighter-Interceptor Group with an Air Defense Command commitment. The squadron initially remained at Lockbourne and flew air defense training missions. On 20 September, the 166th was reassigned to the federalized Oregon ANG 142d Fighter-Interceptor Group which was headquartered at Chicago O'Hare International Airport with no change of mission. However, Strategic Air Command (SAC) had taken over Lockbourne AFB on 1 April 1951 it was decided to move the 166th FIS to Youngstown Municipal Airport, Ohio, which was accomplished on 31 October 1952. The squadron was released from federal service and returned to Ohio State control on 1 November, remaining in Youngstown.

=== Early Cold War era ===
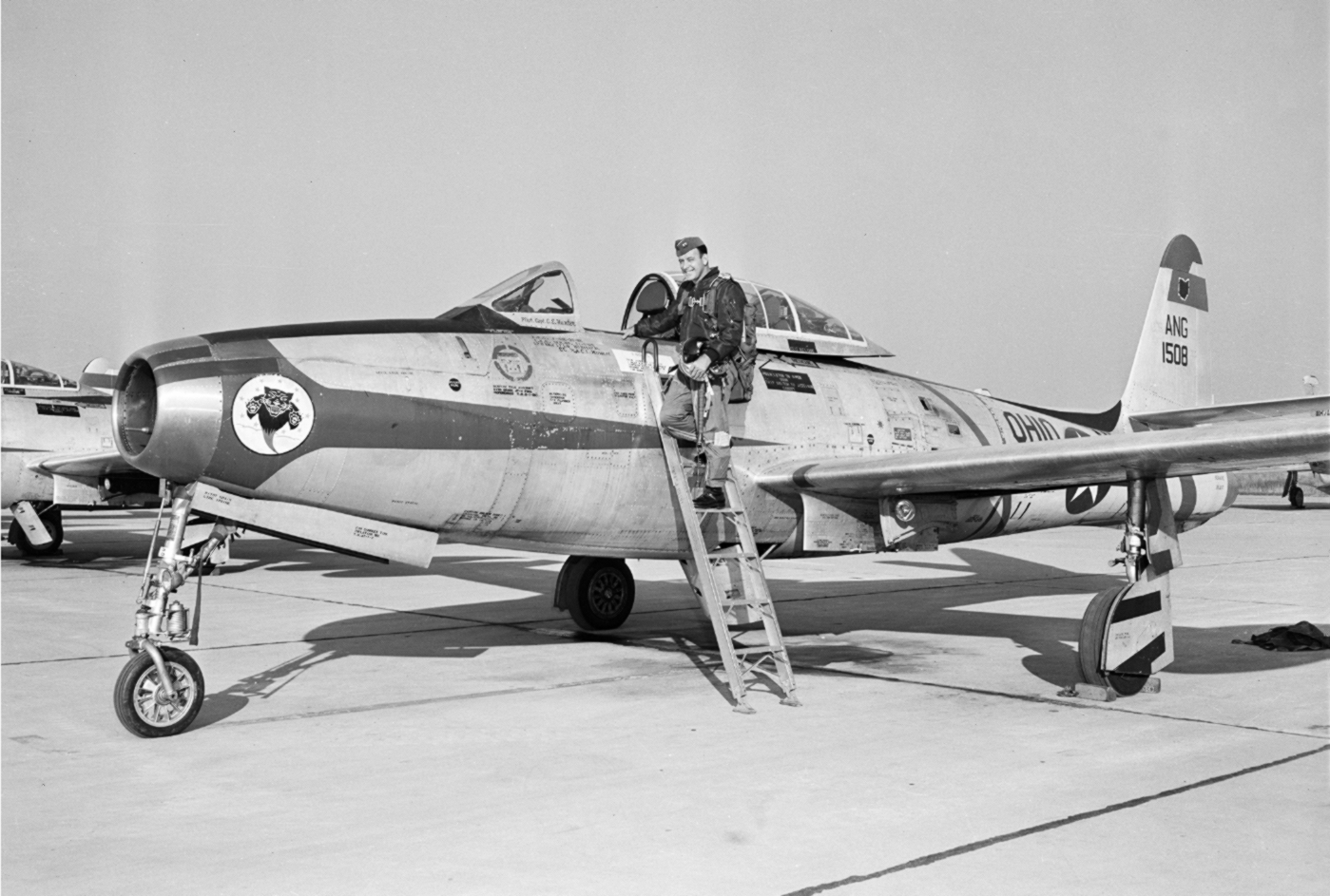
The 162nd FS flew the F-84E Thunderjet from 1955–1957

The 112th was reformed at Akron-Canton Airport and re-designated as the 112th Fighter-Bomber Squadron. It was re-equipped with F-51H Mustangs, and were one of the last two Air National Guard squadrons to fly this version of the Mustang. It was assigned to the 121st Fighter-Bomber Group.

At its new base at Youngstown, the 166th Fighter-Interceptor Squadron was re-equipped with F-51H Mustangs which the squadron flew until 1954 when the 166th received refurbished F-80A Shooting Stars that had been modified and upgraded to F-80C standards. With the F-80s, the squadron began standing daytime air defense alert at Youngstown, placing two aircraft at the end of the runway with pilots in the cockpit from one hour before sunrise until one hour after sunset. The squadron only operated the Shooting Star until January 1955 when the 166th received F-84E Thunderjets that had returned from wartime duty in Korea.

In September 1953 the 164th, now designated as a Fighter-Bomber Squadron, received its first jet aircraft, refurbished F-80A Shooting Stars that had been modified and upgraded to F-80C standards. The squadron only operated the Shooting Star for a year when in October 1954 the equipment was changed to F-84E Thunderjets that had returned from wartime duty in Korea. In August 1954, the 164th began standing daytime air defense alert at Mansfield, placing two aircraft at the end of the runway with pilots in the cockpit from one hour before sunrise until one hour after sunset. This ADC alert lasted each and every day until 30 June 1956.

In September 1955 Air Defense Command wanted to re-equip the 162d Fighter Interceptor Squadron from F-51H Mustangs to jet-powered F-84E Thunderjets in accordance with the USAF directive to phase out propeller-driven fighter-interceptor aircraft from the inventory. However, because the runways at the Cox-Dayton Municipal Airport were too short at that time to support jet fighter operations, the National Guard Bureau approved the relocation request by the Ohio ANG to move the squadron to Springfield Municipal Airport, just east of Dayton.

With new facilities under construction at Springfield, the 162d Fighter-Interceptor Squadron conducted their transition training from temporary facilities at Wright-Patterson Air Force Base. The F-84E Thunderjets were Korean War veteran aircraft and the squadron received training in the equipment from the Ohio ANG 164th and 166th Tactical Fighter Squadrons.

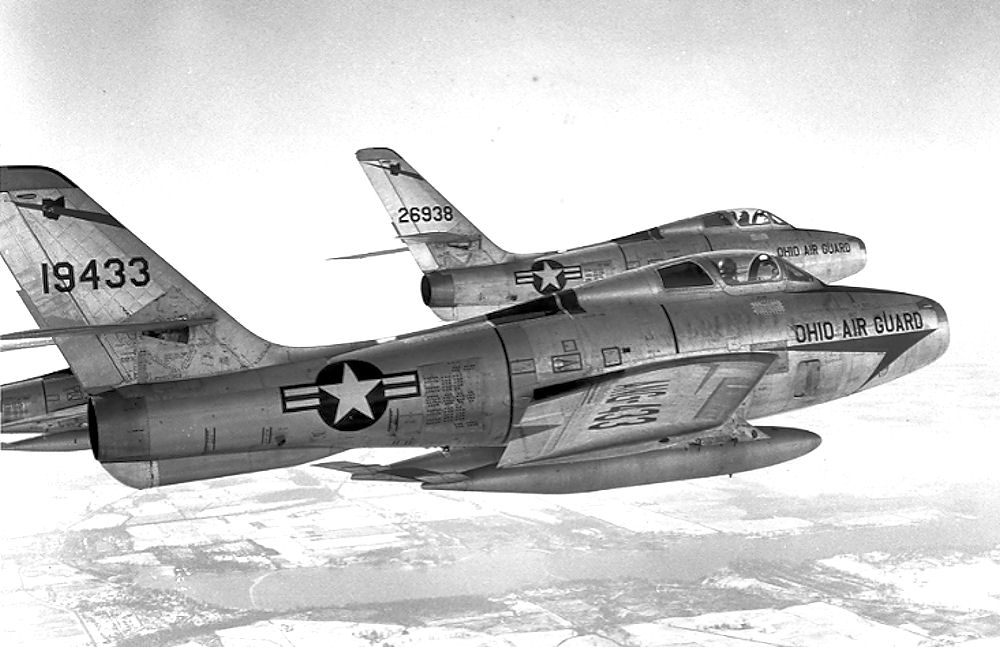
Two 164th TFS F-84F Thunderstreaks in formation 51-9433 and 52-6938

In October 1955, the 112th FBS were informed that they were to receive F-84E Thunderjets, but since the runways at Akron-Canton Municipal Airport were deemed inadequate for jet operations, it was decided to construct an entirely new facility for them at the new Toledo Express Airport at Toledo. The 112th FBS left Akron-Canton for the Toledo Municipal Airport on 1 April 1956 and retired their F-51H Mustangs for T-28A Trojans, and operated F-84Es until the summer of 1958. In January 1959, the 112th's facility at the Toledo Express Airport and moved to the new facility. The T-28s were replaced with new F-84F Thunderstreaks the squadron was designated as a Tactical Fighter Squadron.

In early 1956, a fifth squadron was gained by the 121st. The 145th Air Transport Squadron was allotted to the Ohio Air National Guard by the National Guard Bureau to replace the 112th Fighter-Bomber Squadron at Akron-Canton Airport. The 145th ATS, gained by the Military Air Transport Service (MATS) received federal recognition on 17 March 1956. Initially assigned C-46D Commando twin-engine propeller transports, the squadron was upgraded in 1958 to C-119J Flying Boxcar transports, fitted for aeromedical transport of personnel to medical facilities.

In early 1957, the 164th FBS sent their war-weary F-84C Thunderjets to storage at Davis-Monthan AFB, Arizona and received new F-84F Thunderstreak swept-wing interceptors. Later in 1957, the 164th Fighter-Bomber Squadron received the 1st Air Force Flying Safety Award for three consecutive years of accident-free flying, an impressive accomplishment as in the previous three years the squadron had flown three different types of aircraft.

The 166th was upgraded with new F-84F Thunderstreaks in November 1957, the gaining command of the squadron became Tactical Air Command (TAC), however, it remained attached to Air Defense Command in a secondary role. In 1959, the need for active duty Air Defense Command bases and regular Air Force fighter-interceptor operations were diminishing and the intent to scale back operations at Youngstown AFB was announced on 28 October 1959. The Ohio Air National Guard moved the 121st FBG back to Lockbourne Air Force Base on 1 March 1960.

=== 1961 Berlin Crisis ===
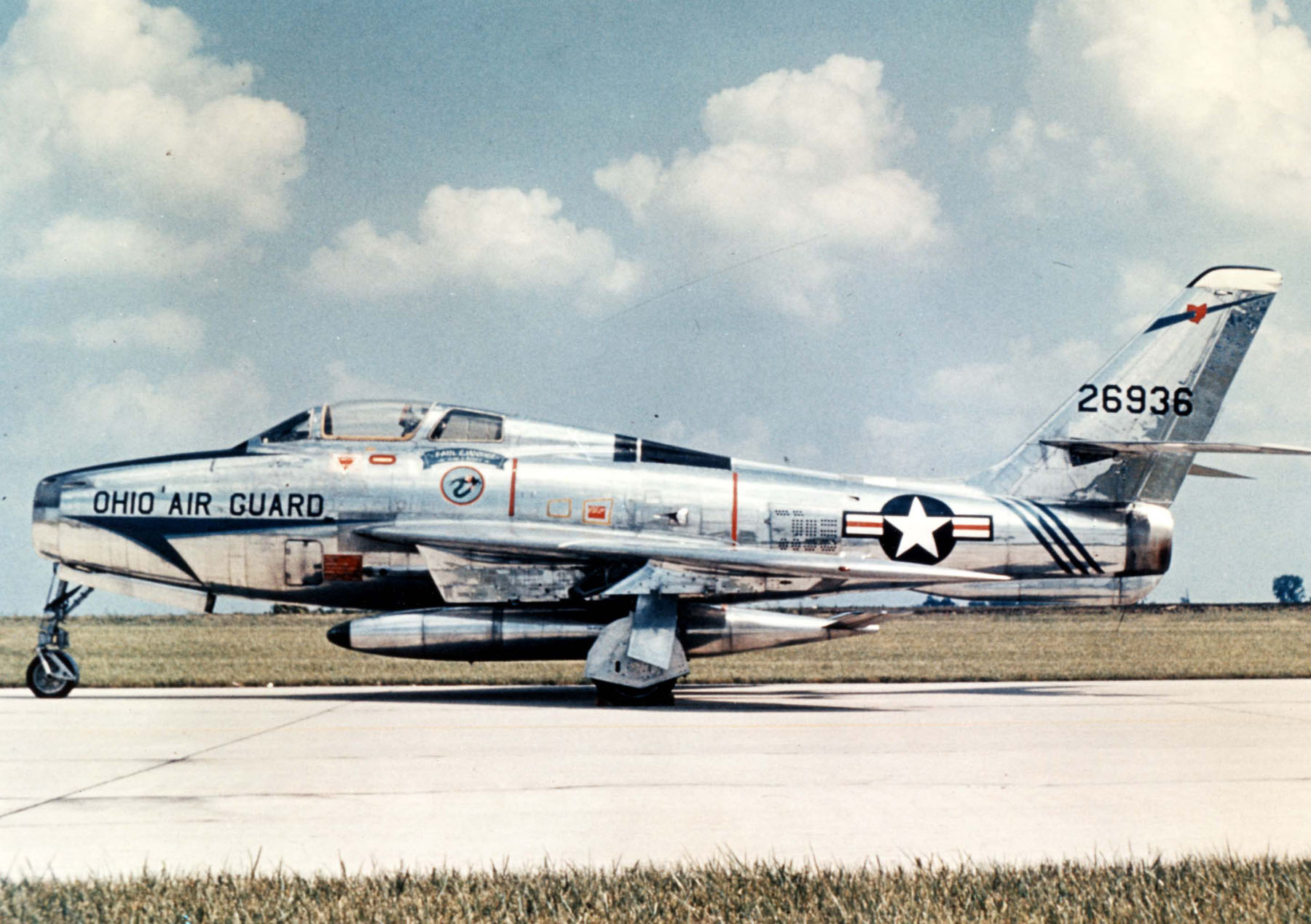
Former Ohio 166th TFS Republic F-84F-40-RE Thunderstreak, Serial 52-6526. Today, this aircraft is on permanent exhibit at the Museum of the United States Air Force Wright-Patterson AFB, Ohio

The 121st Tactical Fighter Wing were called to active duty for a period of twelve months on 1 October. When activated, the federalized wing consisted of three operational units, the 162d TFS at Springfield, the 164th TFS at Mansfield, and the 166th at Lockbourne. The 112th TFS at Toledo and the 145th ATS at Akron were temporally attached directly to Ohio ANG Headquarters at Columbus for the period of federalization. The mission of the activated 121st TFW was to reinforce the United States Air Forces in Europe (USAFE), and deploy to Étain-Rouvres Air Base, France, a standby USAFE base. However, due to funding shortages, only 26 F-84F Thunderstreaks of 166th TFS were deployed to France, although several ground support units from the 162nd and 164th were also deployed.

On 4 November the first ANG T-33 aircraft arrived at Etain, with the F-84s arriving on 16 November. In July 1962 the deployed Air National Guardsmen were no longer needed in Europe and the 7121st began to redeploy its personnel to Ohio. All the aircraft and support equipment, however, remained at Etain to equip a new wing being formed there, the 366th Tactical Fighter Wing. The last of the ANG personnel departed on 9 August 1962.

=== 1962 reorganization ===
With the wing's return from France in 1962, the Ohio Air National Guard received authorization from the National Guard Bureau to expand its squadrons to groups.

- This expansion had commenced in July 1961 when the 145th Air Transport Squadron was moved to Clinton County Air Force Base. The 145th ATS was realigned to Tactical Air Command and became a C-97 Stratofreighter air refueling squadron. The runways at Akron could not support the large C-97 operation which forced a move to Clinton County AFB. The 160th Air Refueling Group received federal recognition on 8 July 1961.
- The 178th Tactical Fighter Group received federal recognition on 15 October 1962 at Springfield. The 162d Tactical Fighter Squadron was transferred from the 121st TFG to become its operational squadron.
- The 179th Tactical Fighter Group received federal recognition on 15 October 1962 at Mansfield. The 164th Tactical Fighter Squadron was transferred from the 121st TFG to become its operational squadron.
- The 180th Tactical Fighter Group received federal recognition on 15 October 1962 at Toledo. The 112th Tactical Fighter Squadron was transferred from the 121st TFG to become its operational squadron.

The 121st Tactical Fighter Group retained its 164th Tactical Fighter Squadron at Lockbourne AFB.

=== Vietnam War and late Cold War era ===
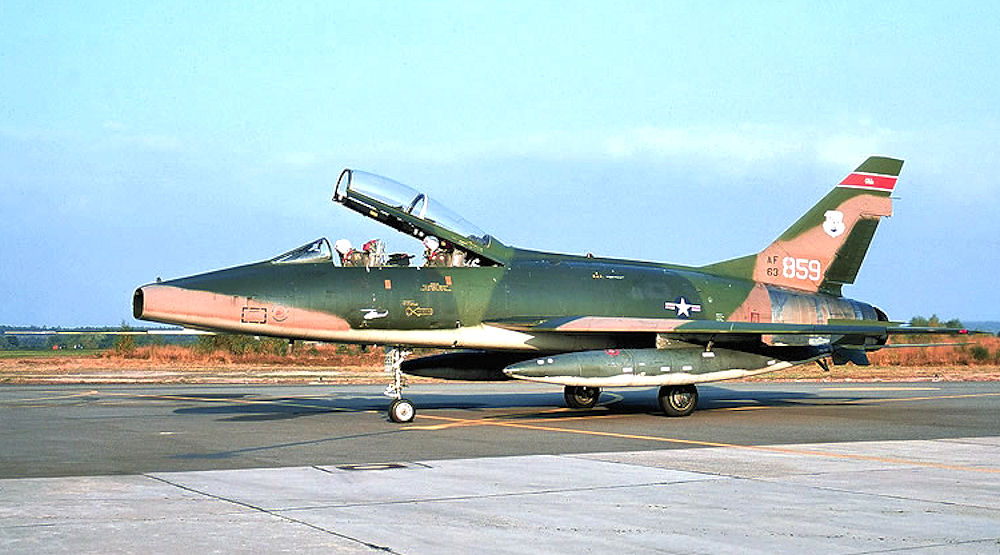
162d Tactical Fighter Squadron – North American F-100F Super Sabre 56-3859 about 1975

In 1962, having left their Thunderstreaks in France, the 166th TFS at Lockbourne was re-equipped with F-100C Super Sabre fighter-bombers, which greatly enhanced its mission capabilities.

In 1964, the 160th ARG participated in Operation Ready Go, the first all United States Air National Guard (ANG) non-stop deployment of fighter aircraft to Europe. In 1965, the KC-97Gs were upgraded to KC-97Ls with addition of jet engine pods mounted to the outboard wings. 1967 saw the beginning of Operation Creek Party, a continuous rotational mission flying from Rhein Main Air Base, West Germany, providing air refueling to United States Air Forces in Europe (USAFE) tactical aircraft. The success of this operation, which would continue until 1975, demonstrated the ability of the Air National Guard to perform significant day-to-day missions without being mobilized. It was taken over by the active-duty Strategic Air Command 7th Air Force.

Along with the Kansas ANG F-100C 127th Tactical Fighter Squadron, the 166th TFS was federalized and deployed to Kunsan Air Base, South Korea. The federalized ANG squadrons were assigned as part of the 354th Tactical Fighter Wing. The squadrons flew deterrent air defense missions over South Korean airspace during the next year. During the deployment some pilots flew combat missions in South Vietnam while performing temporary assignments with other units. The performance of the ANG units at Kusan in 1968–69 suggested the prerequisites of effective air reserve programs and paved the way for adoption of the total force policy in 1970 which exists today. In 1971 the squadrons F-100Cs were retired and replaced by F-100D/F Super Sabres, being received from combat units in South Vietnam that were returning to the United States.

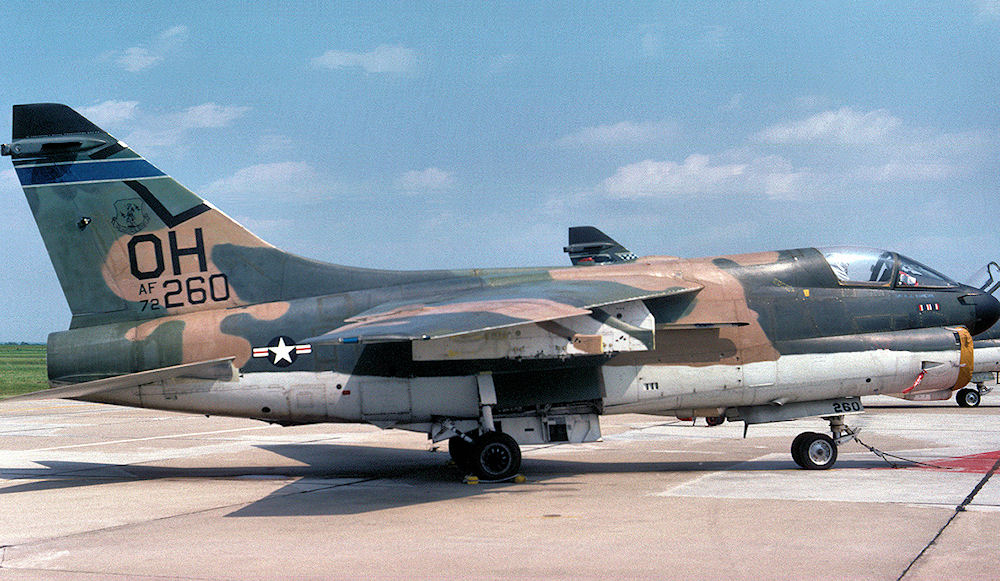
166th TFS A-7D 72–260 about 1979

In the spring of 1970, the 178th TFG's F-84F Thunderstreaks were sent to Davis-Monthan AFB for storage, the squadron receiving Vietnam War veteran F-100D/F Super Sabres. Concentration on the qualifications of aircrews, munitions load crews and the attainment of a C-3 combat readiness rating were the primary objectives for 1971. The group achieved C-3 on 30 August, a first for F-100D-equipped Air Guard units. January 1972 saw the squadron in extensive practice for their pending 9th Air Force Operational Readiness Inspection (ORI). The ORI was conducted in March and the 9th Air Force did not agree with the unit's C-3 rating. A retake was scheduled in June, with the 162d TFS coming away with the TAC-confirmed rating of C-1, the first F-100D squadron to achieve this feat. In 1971, the 180th TFG retired its Thunderstreaks and also converted to the F-100 Super Sabre.

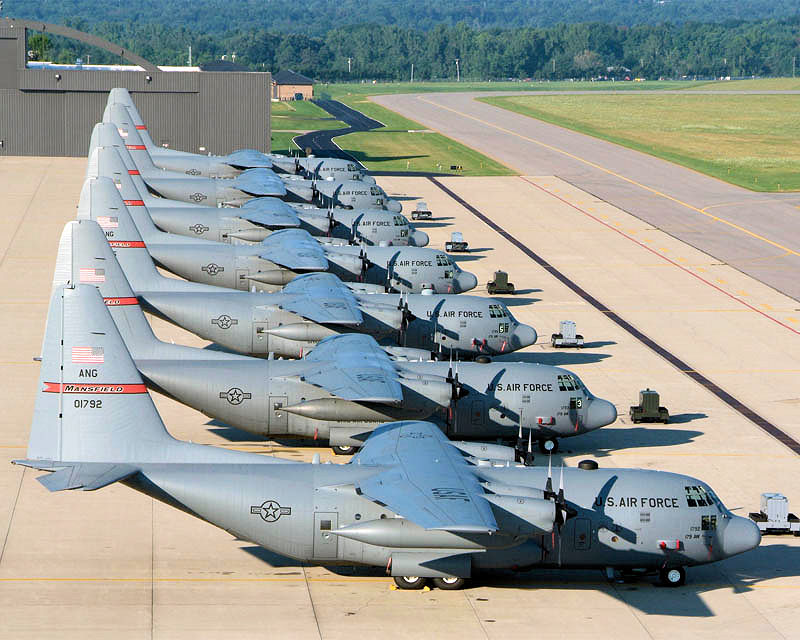
164th Airlift Squadron C-130 Hercules

In 1971, Clinton County Air Force Base was closed as a result of the Nixon Administration looking to save money because of the Vietnam War. As part of the moving out of units from Clinton County AFB, the 160th ARG was moved to Lockbourne Air Force Base near Columbus, Ohio.

In February 1972, the 179th TGS also retired its Thunderstreaks and converted to the F-100 Super Sabre. The squadron flew the F-100s until the winter of 1976 when the 179th was transferred from Tactical Air Command to Military Airlift Command on 5 January. At this time, the unit converted to the Lockheed C-130B Hercules and received a complement of eight aircraft. With the change of equipment, the unit was designated a Tactical Airlift Group.

In 1974, under the "Total Force Policy", Guard and Reserve units began to receive newer aircraft and equipment in the 1970s. The 166th TFS began conversion to the A-7D Corsair II in December which brought with it additional missions. The 178th TFG received the A-7D in January 1978. The conversion from the F-100 to the A-7 was accomplished in less than three months, the fastest ever for an Air Force or Air National Guard unit. The 179th TFG converted to A-7D in the summer of 1979

In December 1974 Tactical Air Command transferred its air refueling units to Strategic Air Command. In 1975, the 160th ARG became the first Air National Guard unit to convert to the Boeing KC-135 Stratotanker all jet tanker aircraft as part of SAC's Eighth Air Force. The group was the first ANG unit to perform the SAC 24-hour Alert mission and pass a SAC Operational Readiness Inspection in July 1976.

During the 1980s the squadrons and groups of the 121st were frequently deployed, primarily to Europe during USAFE exercises. The "OH" tailcode of the wing was a frequent sight at bases in England, West Germany and other NATO air bases. In 1989, while deployed at Panama for a Coronet Cove deployment, 180th TFG A-7s were employed during Operation Just Cause.

=== 1990 Gulf Crisis ===
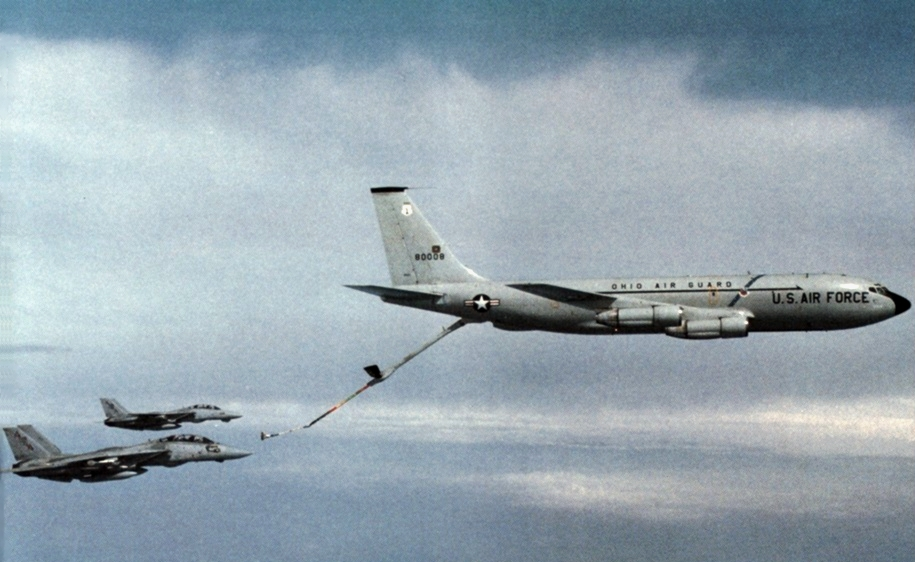
160th ARG KC-135 refuels two U.S. Navy Grumman F-14A Tomcat fighters from Fighter Squadron VF-74.

In August 1990, the 160th Air Refueling Group was one of the first Air Guard units to deploy aircraft to the Middle East after the Iraqi invasion of Kuwait. Aircraft, aircrews and support personnel began volunteer rotational Desert Shield deployments to a provisional Tanker Task Force at King Abdul Aziz Air Base, Jeddah, Saudi Arabia (1709th ARS (P)). The 160th was called to active duty on 20 December 1990. Deployment began on 28 December and the 160th became part of three Provisional Air Refueling Wings at Al Banteen Air Base, Abu Dhabi (1712th ARS (P)), Al Dhafra Air Base, Dubai (1705th ARS (P)), and Jeddah. Additional personnel augmented a regional support base at Morón Air Base, Spain while others deployed to various bases to "backfill" for deployed active duty personnel. Aircraft and volunteer aircrews were heavily involved in "Air Bridge" refueling missions supporting deployment of combat forces to Southwest Asia.

The 179th Airlift Group was active during Desert Shield/Storm providing airlift support throughout the Continental United States and Europe. Portions of the 179th were activated during Desert Shield/Storm and served in the US, Europe and Saudi Arabia.

The 164th Tactical Fighter Squadron, 178th and 180th Tactical Fighter Groups did not deploy to Saudi Arabia in 1990 during Operation Desert Shield or Operation Desert Storm as the A-7Ds were considered a second-line aircraft. Ohio Air National Guard volunteers, however were deployed to CENTAF during the crisis and subsequent combat operations.

=== Post Cold War reorganization ===
After the collapse of the Soviet Union in 1990 and Operation Desert Storm, USAF planners reorganized the major command structure and the organization of its units to reflect the new reality of the 1990s and also a smaller force after the end of the Cold War.

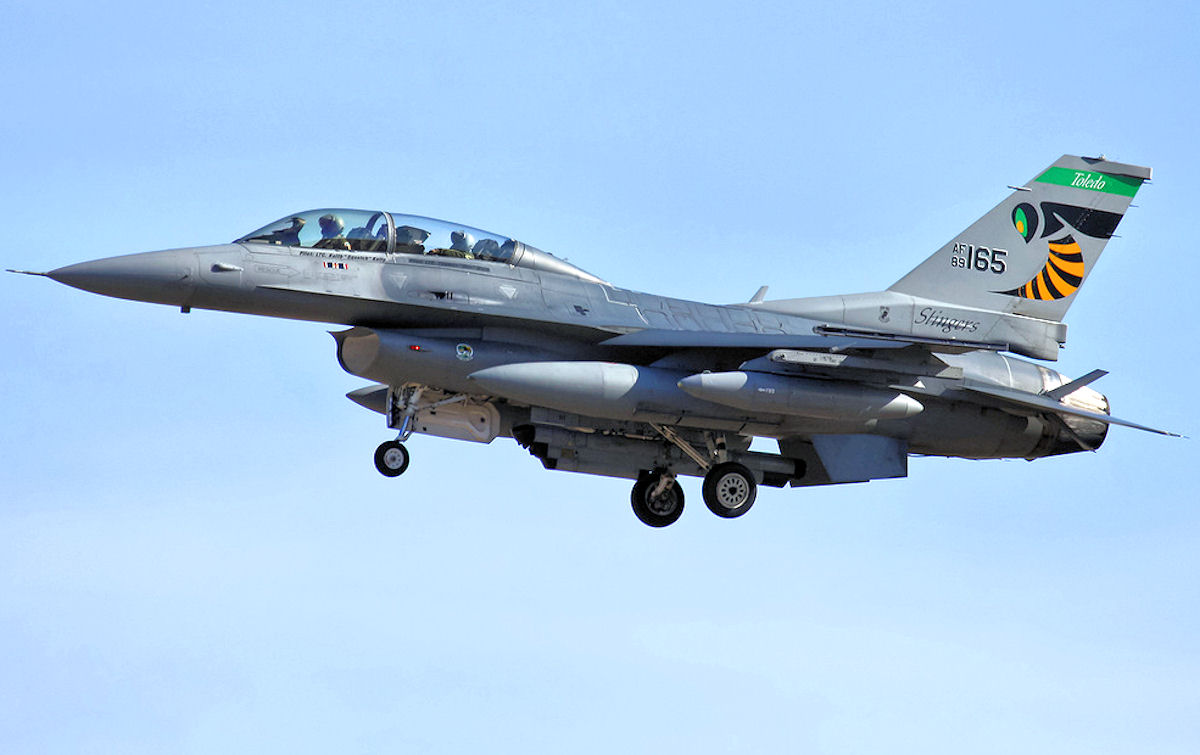
112th Fighter Squadron – General Dynamics F-16D Block 42F Fighting Falcon 89-2165

Strategic Air Command, Military Airlift Command and Tactical Air Command were all inactivated. In their place Air Combat Command and Air Mobility Command became the gaining commands for the Ohio Air National Guard units effective 1 June 1992.

- The 160th Air Refueling Group became part of Air Combat Command. In 1991 it was upgraded to the more fuel-efficient KC-135R Stratotanker.
- The 179th Airlift Group became part of Air Combat Command. In 1991 it was upgraded to the C-130H Hercules.
- The A-7D Corsair II ground support fighters were retired in 1992 and 1993. The 178th and 180th TFG received F-16C Fighting Falcon fighters and became part of Air Combat Command. The 178th Fighter Group was the last United States military organization to fly the A-7D.
- The 166th Tactical Fighter Squadron at Rickenbacker also retired its A-7Ds. It was realigned as a KC-135 air refueling squadron in 1993 as part of Air Combat Combat Command. The 121st also assumed Rickenbacker base support responsibilities. In October 1993, the 121st Air Refueling Wing was consolidated with the 160th Air Refueling Group which was inactivated in the process. With this consolidation, the 121st became a "Super Wing" by gaining the 145th Air Refueling Squadron.

In October 1995, in accordance with the Air Force One Base-One Wing directive the 121st was relieved of its Geographically separated Groups as they were changed in status to Wings, reporting directly to the Ohio Air National Guard. The 178th Fighter Wing stood up on 1 October 1995; the 179th Airlift Wing on 11 October 1995 and the 180th Fighter Wing also on 11 October 1995.

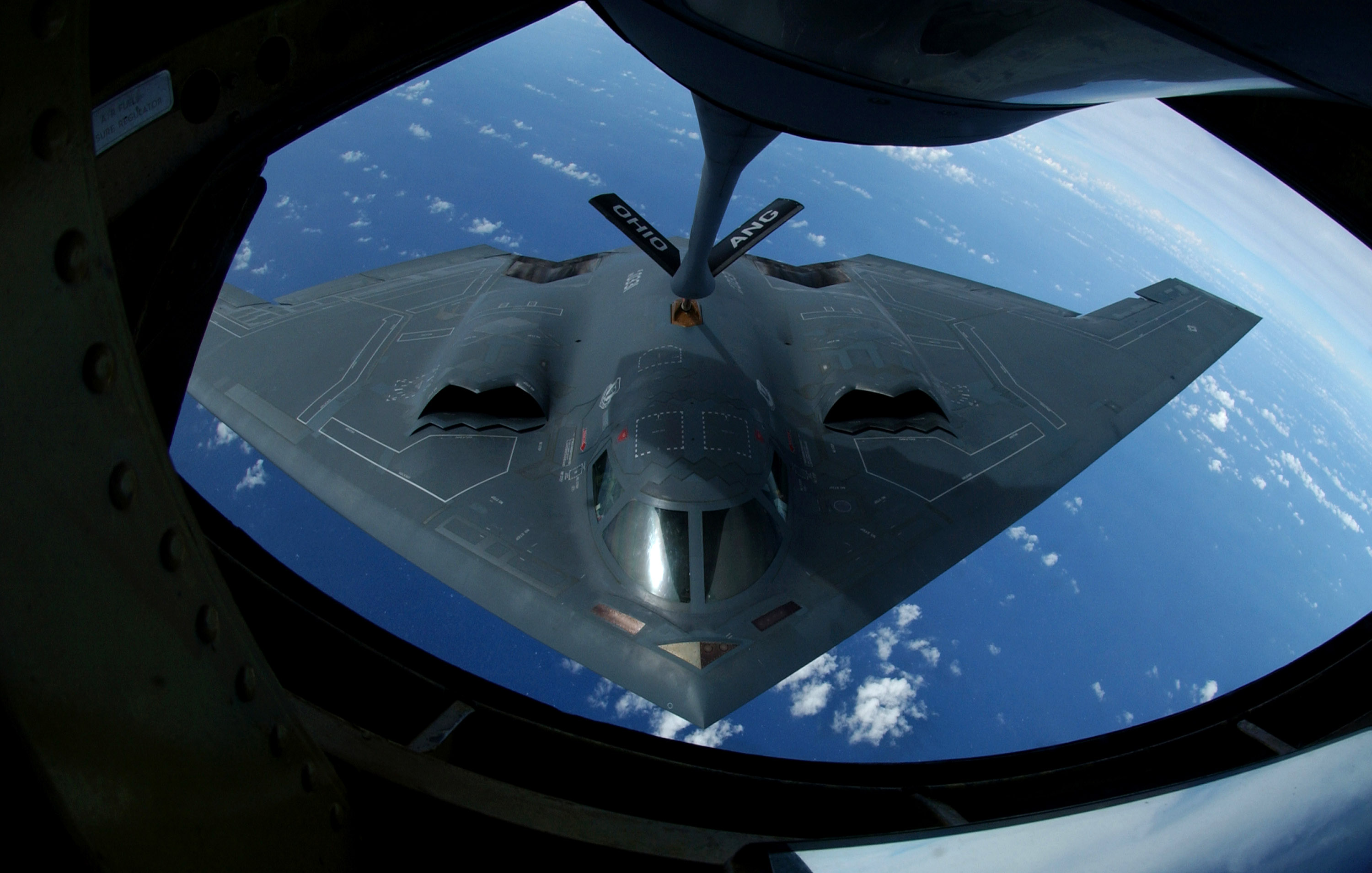
A 121st Air Refueling Wing KC-135 refueling a B-2 Spirit Stealth Bomber

Under the 121st ARW, the 166th and 145th Air Refueling Squadrons began flying from bases in southern France to support strike aircraft during Operation Deny Flight missions over the Balkans. The 121st was a fixture at Incirlik Air Base, Turkey, as well as Prince Sultan Air Base, Saudi Arabia, supporting Operations Northern Watch and Operation Southern Watch, respectively, over Iraq.

=== Twenty-first century ===
After the terrorist attacks on 11 September 2001, the 121st Air Refueling Wing launched into immediate action supporting armed aircraft over the United States during Operation Noble Eagle. The 121st ARW had the distinction of flying more missions than any other unit during this time. The 121st ARW has also deployed and participated in Operation Enduring Freedom over Afghanistan, as well as the Iraq War after 2003.

In addition to the combat deployments, the unit has also been very heavily tasked with airlift missions during national emergencies. Immediately following Hurricane Katrina in August 2005, the 121st ARW was one of the first units to send aircraft into Louisiana filled with supplies and troops. Similar missions were flown in September 2005, after Hurricane Rita.

In 2010, the wing commander Brigadier General Thomas Botchie was forced to resign after allegations of cronyism, fraternization, inappropriate conduct, and sexual harassment were made against him by members of the wing and substantiated by an investigation. Witnesses stated that fraternization and unprofessional relationships within the wing were widespread and also included another senior officer, Colonel Stephen McMahon, the wing's operations group commander.

==== 2026 Iran War ====
During the 2026 Iran war, three airmen from the Wing died following a non-combat crash of a Boeing KC-135 Stratotanker in Western Iraq.

== Lineage ==
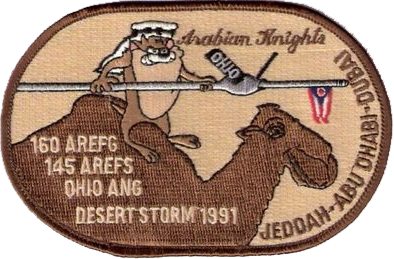
160th Air Refueling Group Desert Storm patch

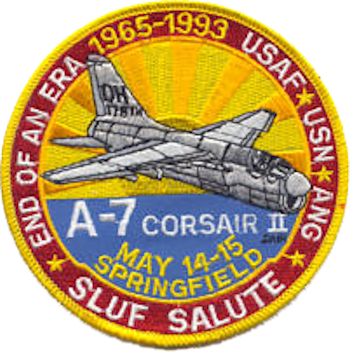
178th Fighter Group A-7 Retirement patch

- Established as the 121st Fighter Wing and allotted to Ohio ANG on 31 October 1950

Organized and received federal recognition, 1 November 1950
Redesignated 121st Fighter-Bomber Wing on 16 October 1952
Redesignated 121st Fighter-Interceptor Wing on 1 November 1952
Redesignated 121st Fighter-Bomber Wing on 1 November 1957
Redesignated 121st Tactical Fighter Wing (Special Delivery) on 1 November 1958
Redesignated 121st Tactical Fighter Wing on 1 September 1961
Federalized and ordered to active service on 1 October 1961
Released from active duty and returned to Ohio state control on 20 August 1952
Redesignated 121st Air Refueling Wing on 16 January 1993

=== Assignments ===
- Ohio Air National Guard, 1 November 1950
- Twelfth Air Force, 4 November 1961
- Ohio Air National Guard, 9 August 1962 – present

Gained by: Eastern Air Defense Force, Air Defense Command
Gained by: Tactical Air Command, 1 November 1957
Gained by: Tactical Air Command
Gained by: Air Combat Command, 1 June 1992
Gained by: Air Mobility Command, 16 January 1993 – present

=== Components ===
- 121st Fighter (later 121st Fighter-Bomber Group, 121st Fighter-Interceptor Group, 121st Tactical Fighter Group, 121st Operations Group), 1 November 1951 – 30 June 1974, 16 January 1993 – present
- 160th Air Refueling Group, 8 July 1961 – 1 October 1993
- 178th Tactical Fighter (later Fighter) Group, 15 October 1962 – 1 October 1995
- 179th Tactical Fighter (later Tactical Airlift, Airlift) Group, 15 October 1962 – 11 October 1995
- 180th Tactical Fighter (later Fighter) Group, 15 October 1962 – 11 October 1995
- 112th Fighter Squadron, 2 December 1946 – 2 December 1946; 10 July 1952 – 1 October 1961; 1 September-15 October 1962
- 145th Air Transport Squadron (later 145th Aeromedical Airlift, 145th Air Refueling Squadron), 17 March 1956 – 8 July 1961
- 149th Fighter Squadron, 1 November 1950 – 28 February 1951; 30 November 1952 – 30 September 1961; 1 September-14 October 1962 (Virginia ANG)
- 362d Fighter Squadron: 1 December 1942 – 20 August 1946

Redesignated 162d Fighter Squadron, 26 June 1948 – 15 October 1962

- 363d Fighter Squadron: 1 December 1942 – 20 August 1946

Redesignated 164th Fighter Squadron, 26 June 1948 – 15 October 1962

- 364th Fighter Squadron: 1 December 1942 – 20 August 1946

Redesignated 166th Fighter (later Fighter-Interceptor, Fighter-Bomber, Tactical Fighter, Fighter, Air Refueling) Squadron, 9 January 1974 – 16 January 1993

- 167th Fighter Squadron, 10 July 1952 – 30 March 1961 (West Virginia ANG)

=== Stations ===
- Lockbourne Air Force Base, Ohio, 1November 1950
- Youngstown Municipal Airport, Ohio, 31 October 1952
- Lockbourne Air Force Base, Ohio, 1 March 1960

Redesignated Rickenbacker Air Force Base, 18 May 1974
Redesignated Rickenbacker Air National Guard Base, 1 April 1980–Present

=== Aircraft ===
- P-39 Airacobra, 1943
- P-51B/C/D/K Mustang, 1943–1946
- F-51D Mustang, 1947–1948
- F-51H Mustang, 1948–1950; 1952–1954
- F-84C Thunderjet, 1950–1952
- RB-26C Invader, 1950–1952
- F-80C Shooting Star, 1954–1955
- F-84E Thunderjet, 1955–1958
- F-84F Thunderjet, 1957–1962
- F-100C Super Sabre, 1962–1971
- F-100D/F Super Sabre, 1971–1974
- A-7D/K Corsair II, 1974–1993
- KC-135R Stratotanker, 1993–present
