= 145th Air Refueling Squadron =

Ohio Air National Guard unit

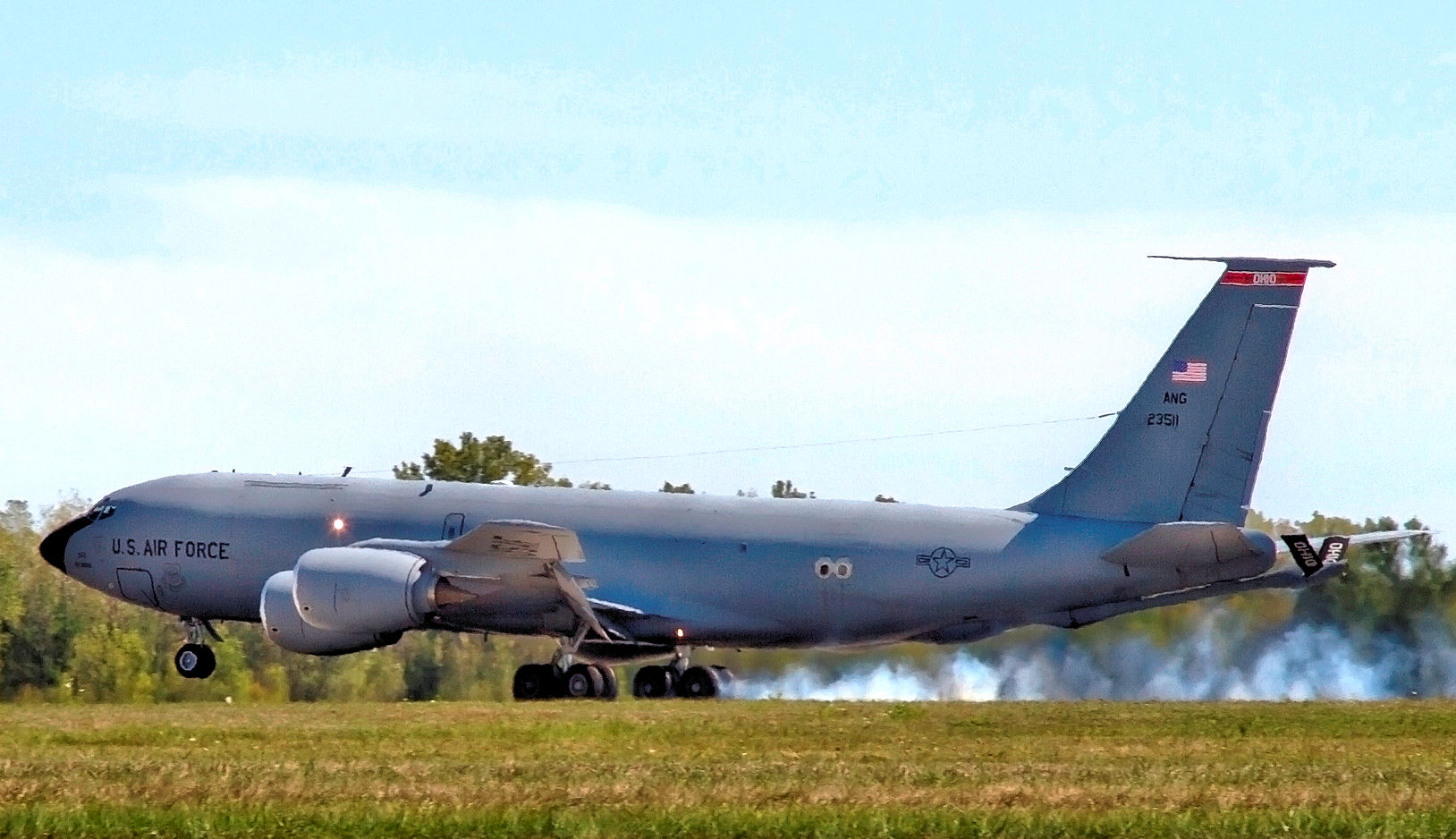
- 145th Air Refueling Squadron KC-135 tanker landing, 16 September 2012
- Active: 1956-2014
- Country: United States
- Allegiance: Ohio
- Branch: Air National Guard
- Type: Squadron
- Role: Aerial refueling
- Nickname: Tazz
- Decorations: Air Force Outstanding Unit Award

Insignia
- 145th Air Refueling Squadron emblem

The 145th Air Refueling Squadron was a unit of the Ohio Air National Guard 121st Air Refueling Wing at Rickenbacker Air National Guard Base, Columbus, Ohio. The 145th was equipped with the KC-135R Stratotanker. The squadron was inactivated during 2014.

== History ==
The 145th Air Transport Squadron was allotted to the Ohio Air National Guard in early 1956 to replace the 112th Fighter-Bomber Squadron at Akron-Canton Airport. The 112th was forced to move from Akron to Toledo Municipal Airport, on 1 April 1956 when the Republic F-84E Thunderjet aircraft it was programmed to receive were unable to use the short runways at Akron.

The 145th was a new Air National Guard organization. The 145th, gained by Military Air Transport Service if mobilized, was assigned to the 121st Tactical Fighter Wing at Columbus, Ohio. The 145th received federal recognition on 17 March 1956.

Initially equipped with Curtiss C-46D Commando twin-engine propeller transports, the squadron was upgraded in 1958 to Fairchild C-119J Flying Boxcar transports, fitted for aeromedical transport of personnel to medical facilities.

=== Tactical Air Command ===
The mission of the squadron was realigned to air refueling of tactical aircraft in July 1961 with the expansion of the unit to group level, and the activation of the 160th Air Refueling Group. Again, the short runways at Akron led to the movement of the squadron to Clinton County Air Force Base when it received large, four-engined Boeing KC-97 Stratofreighters. In 1964, it participated in Operation Ready Go, the first all United States Air National Guard non-stop deployment of fighter aircraft to Europe.

In 1965, the KC-97Gs were upgraded to KC-97Ls with addition of jet engine pods mounted to the outboard wings. 1967 saw the beginning of Operation Creek Party, a continuous rotational mission flying from Rhein Main Air Base, West Germany, providing air refueling to United States Air Forces in Europe tactical aircraft in Operation Creek Party. The success of this operation, which would continue until 1975, demonstrated the ability of the Air National Guard to perform significant day-to-day missions without being mobilized. The 160th was one of the mission's "Charter" units and when its Creek Party participation ended it had safely flown 426 transatlantic crossings. The unit received the Air Force Outstanding Unit Award for the period of 5 June 1967 to 10 May 1968.

The group commander at the time, Colonel Frank Cattran, considered aircraft tail number 52-2630 to be "his" bird and often flew it in preference to any of the others. This aircraft became involved in a "Sister City" ceremony with Zeppelinheim, Germany - a small town near Rhein-Main near the end of the Creek Party operation. Upon the Unit's conversion from KC-97s to KC-135s this aircraft was transferred to the USAF Museum at Wright-Patterson Air Force Base, in Dayton, Ohio, where it can be seen today with its Ohio Air National Guard and Zeppelinheim markings.

In 1971, Clinton County Air Force Base was closed as a result of the Nixon Administration looking to save money because of the Vietnam War. As part of the moving out of units from Clinton County, the 145th moved to Lockbourne Air Force Base near Columbus, Ohio.

A second Air Force Outstanding Unit Award was received for the period of 11 May 1968 to 30 June 1975.

=== Strategic Air Command ===
In December 1974, air refueling units formerly gained on mobilization by Tactical Air Command became gaied by Strategic Air Command (SAC) as the single manager for Air Force air refueling. Later in 1975, the squadron became the first Air National Guard unit to convert to the Boeing KC-135 Stratotanker jet tanker aircraft. The group was the first ANG unit to perform the SAC 24-hour alert mission and pass a SAC Operational Readiness Inspection in July 1976.

The 145th also participated in SAC overseas tanker task forces and other priority missions worldwide. In 1984, the KC-135As were re-engined and redesignated as KC-135Es. The upgrade to turbofan engines provided a significant increase in performance, safety and reliability.

In August 1990, the 145th was one of the first Air Guard units to deploy aircraft to the Middle East after Iraq's invasion of Kuwait. Aircraft, aircrews and support personnel began volunteer rotational Operation Desert Shield deployments to a provisional tanker task force at King Abdul Aziz Air Base, Jeddah, Saudi Arabia (the 1709th Air Refueling Wing (Provisional)). The 145th was called to active duty on 20 December 1990. Deployment began on 28 December and the 145th became part of three provisional air refueling wings at Al Banteen Air Base, Abu Dhabi, Al Dhafra Air Base, Dubai, and Jeddah. Aircraft and volunteer aircrews were heavily involved in "Air Bridge" refueling missions supporting deployment of combat forces to Southwest Asia. Combat flying missions for Operation Desert Storm commenced on 17 January 1991.

September 1991 brought the stand down of the SAC Alert mission which the squadron had maintained continuously for more than 15 years. The 145th began the conversion to KC-135R aircraft in October 1991, and in June 1992, SAC was inactivated with the squadron becoming gained by the new Air Mobility Command.

=== Air Mobility Command ===
In September 1993, the squadron's parent group was inactivated with the implementation of the Air Force's Objective Wing program, bringing units on an installation under a single wing. The 145th was reassigned to the new 121st Operations Group under the reorganized 121st Air Refueling Wing, joining with the 166th Air Refueling Squadron, which had become a KC-135R squadron in 1992 when it retired its LTV A-7D Corsair II ground support aircraft. With the addition of the 145th, the 121st became one of only a few "Super Wings" in the Air National Guard, with twice as many aircraft assigned as other units.

Under the 121st Wing, the squadron began flying from bases in southern France to support strike aircraft during Operation Deny Flight missions over the Balkans. The unit was a fixture at Incirlik Air Base, Turkey, as well as Prince Sultan Air Base, Saudi Arabia, supporting Operations Northern Watch and Operation Southern Watch, respectively, over Iraq.

After the terrorist attacks on 11 September 2001, the 121st Wing launched into immediate action supporting armed aircraft over the United States during Operation Noble Eagle. The squadronhas also deployed and participated in War in Afghanistan (2001–2021), as well as in the Iraq War after 2003.

In addition to the combat deployments, the unit has also been tasked with airlift missions during national emergencies. Immediately following Hurricane Katrina in August 2005, the squadron was one of the first units to send aircraft into Louisiana filled with supplies and troops. Similar missions were flown in September 2005, after Hurricane Rita.

The squadron conducted its final KC-135R flight on 24 September 2013. The 145th stood down during 2014.

=== Lineage ===
- Constituted as the 145th Air Transport Squadron and allotted to the Air National Guard in 1956

Activated and extended federal recognition on 17 March 1956
Redesignated 145th Aeromedical Transport Squadron, 1 July 1958
Redesignated 145th Air Refueling Squadron, 8 July 1961
Federalized and ordered to active service on 20 December 1990
Released from active duty and returned to Ohio state control on 15 March 1991
Inactivated c. 30 September 2014 and withdrawn from the Air National Guard

=== Assignments ===
- 121st Fighter-Interceptor Wing (later 121st Fighter-Bomber Wing), 17 March 1956
- 106th Aeomedical Transport Group, 1 July 1958
- 160th Air Refueling Group, 8 July 1961 (elements detached to: 1709th Air Refueling Wing (Provisional)), 20 December 1990 – 15 March 1991
- 121st Operations Group, 1 October 1993 – present

=== Stations ===
- Akron-Canton Airport, Ohio, 17 March 1956
- Clinton County Air Force Base, Ohio, 1 July 1961
- Lockbourne Air Force Base (later Rickenbacker Air Force Base, Rickenbacker Air National Guard Base), Ohio, 1 October 1971 – present

=== Aircraft ===
- Curtiss C-46D Commando, 1956-1958
- Fairchild C-119J Flying Boxcar, 1958-1961
- Boeing KC-97F/G Stratotanker, 1961-1965
- Boeing KC-97L Stratotanker, 1965-1975
- Boeing KC-135A Stratotanker, 1975-1984
- Boeing KC-135E Stratotanker, 1984-1991
- Boeing KC-135R Stratotanker, 1991–2014
