= KMFD =

KMFD may refer to:

- the ICAO code for Mansfield Lahm Regional Airport, in Mansfield, Ohio, United States
- KTVL-DT2, a digital subchannel of television station KTVL (channel 35) licensed to Medford, Oregon, United States, which previously used the fictional call sign KMFD
