= 160th Air Refueling Group =

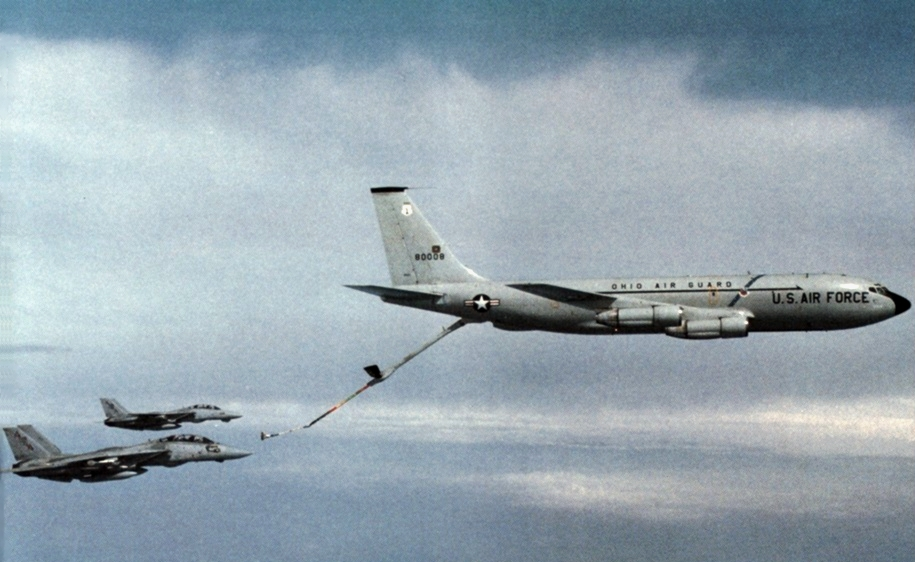
- Boeing KC-135E Stratotanker (s/n 58-0008) from the 145th Air Refueling Squadron, 160th Air Refueling Group, Ohio Air National Guard, refuels two U.S. Navy Grumman F-14A Tomcat fighters from Fighter Squadron VF-74 Be-Devilers, assigned to Carrier Air Wing 17 (CVW-17) aboard the aircraft carrier USS Saratoga (CV-60).
- Active: 1961-1993
- Country: United States
- Branch: Air National Guard
- Type: Group
- Role: Air Refueling
- Part of: Ohio Air National Guard
- Garrison/HQ: Rickenbacker Air National Guard Base, Columbus, Ohio

Insignia
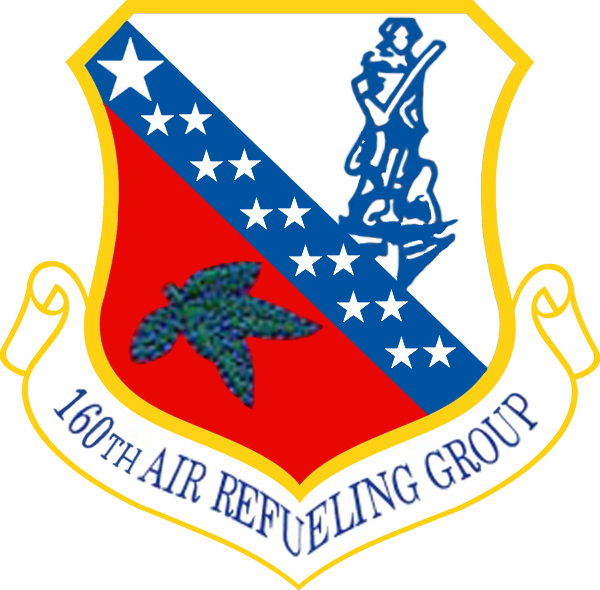
- 160th Air Refueling Group emblem

The 160th Air Refueling Group (160 ARG) is an inactive unit of the Ohio Air National Guard. It was last stationed at Rickenbacker Air National Guard Base, Columbus, Ohio. The 160th ARW was inactivated on 1 October 1993.

== History ==
On 8 July 1961 the 145th Aeromedical Evacuation Transport Squadron of the Ohio Air National Guard became an air refueling squadron (145th ARS) and was expanded to add support squadrons and a group, the 160th Air Refueling Group, to control support and flying operations. The 145th ARS becoming the group's flying squadron. The initial support squadrons assigned to the group were the 160th Air Base Squadron and the 160th Material Squadron. The group was equipped with Boeing KC-97 Stratofreighters.

=== Tactical Air Command ===
Tactical Air Command (TAC) was designated as the gaining command for the group when it received federal recognition. In the fall of 1962 the group's support elements were reorganized to match the organization of other groups gained by TAC. The 160th USAF Dispensary was activated and the 160th Combat Support Squadron supplanted the air base squadron.

In 1964 the 160th ARG participated in Operation Ready Go, the first all United States Air National Guard (ANG) non-stop deployment of fighter aircraft to Europe. In 1965 the group's KC-97Gs were upgraded to KC-97Ls with addition of jet engine pods mounted on the outboard wings.

1967 saw the beginning of Operation Creek Party. This operation provided air refueling support to United States Air Forces in Europe tactical aircraft through the rotation of ANG aircrews and aircraft flying from Rhein Main Air Base, Germany This operation, which continued until 1975, demonstrated the ability of the ANG to perform significant day-to-day missions without being mobilized. The 160th was one of the mission's charter units and when its Creek Party participation ended it had safely flown 426 transatlantic crossings. The unit received the Air Force Outstanding Unit Award for the period of 5 June 1967 to 10 May 1968.

The group commander during Creek Party operations, Colonel Frank Cattran, considered aircraft 52–2630 to be "his" bird and often flew it in preference to other assigned planes. This aircraft became involved in a "Sister City" ceremony with Zeppelinheim, Germany - a small town near Rhein-Main AB - near the end of the Creek Party operation. When the unit converted from KC-97s to Boeing KC-135 Stratotankers this aircraft was transferred to the USAF Museum at Wright-Patterson Air Force Base, where it can be seen today with its Ohio Air National Guard and Zeppelinheim markings.

In 1971 Clinton County Air Force Base was closed in an economy move by the Nixon Administration to divert military funding to support the Vietnam War. The 160th ARG moved from the closing base to Lockbourne Air Force Base near Columbus, Ohio. The group earned a second Air Force Outstanding Unit Award for the period of 11 May 1968 to 30 June 1975.

=== Strategic Air Command ===
In December 1974 Strategic Air Command became the gaining command for all air refueling units, including the 160th. In 1975 the 160th ARG became the first Air National Guard unit to convert to the Boeing KC-135 Stratotanker. The group was the first ANG unit to perform the SAC 24-hour alert mission and pass a SAC Operational Readiness Inspection in July, 1976. The 160th also participated in SAC overseas Tanker Task Forces and other priority missions worldwide. In 1984, the group's KC-135As were re-engined and redesignated as KC-135Es. The upgrade to turbofan engines provided a significant increase in performance, safety and reliability.

In August 1990 the 160th was one of the first ANG units to deploy aircraft to the Middle East after Iraq's invasion of Kuwait. Aircraft, aircrews, and support personnel began volunteer Desert Shield deployments to a provisional tanker task force at King Abdul Aziz Air Base, Jeddah, Saudi Arabia, designated the 1709th Air Refueling Squadron (Provisional). The group was called to active duty on 20 December 1990. Deployment of the unit to the Middle East began on 28 December and 160th crews and aircraft became part of three provisional air refueling wings at Al Banteen Air Base, Abu Dhabi (1712th Air Refueling Squadron (Provisional)), Al Dhafra Air Base, Dubai (1705th Air Refueling Squadron (Provisional)), and at Jeddah. Group personnel also augmented a regional support base at Moron AB, Spain while others deployed to various bases to backfill deployed active duty personnel. Aircraft and volunteer aircrews were heavily involved in "Air Bridge" refueling missions supporting deployment of combat forces to Southwest Asia.

The group began flying Operation Desert Storm combat missions on 17 January 1991. The 160th compiled a remarkable record of mission accomplishment during combat operations. When hostilities ended, the 160th returned home in March 1991 and was welcomed by families and friends.

September 1991 brought the end of the SAC alert mission which the 160th ARG had maintained continuously for more than 15 years. The 145th ARS began conversion to KC-135R aircraft in October 1991, In June 1992 Strategic Air Command was inactivated and the 160th ARG gaining command became Air Mobility Command.

=== Inactivation ===
In September 1993 the 160th Air Refueling Group was inactivated when budget reductions and a reorganization of ANG assets forced a reduction of Ohio ANG units at Rickenbacker ANGB through the elimination of duplicate refueling headquarters and support organizations. The group's 145th Air Refueling Squadron was transferred to the 121st Air Refueling Wing at Rickenbacker. With the addition of the 145th ARS, the 121st ARW became one of only a few "Super Wings" in the ANG, with two flying squadrons and twice as many aircraft assigned as other units.

=== Lineage ===
- Constituted as the 160th Air Refueling Group, Tactical and allotted the Air National Guard on 13 March 1961

Activated and extended federal recognition on 8 July 1961
Redesignated 160th Air Refeling Group, Medium ca. 1966
Redesignated 160th Air Refueling Group, Heavy 1976
Redesignated 160th Air Refueling Group 16 March 1992
Inactivated on 1 October 1993

=== Assignments ===
- 126th Air Refueling Wing, 8 July 1961

Gained by: Tactical Air Command
Gained by: Eighth Air Force, Strategic Air Command, 1 December 1974 – 16 March 1992

- 121st Air Refueling Wing, 16 March 1992 – 1 October 1993

Gained by: Eighth Air Force, Strategic Air Command
Gained by: Air Combat Command, 1 June 1992 – 1 October 1993

=== Components ===
- 145th Air Refueling Squadron, 8 July 1961 – 1 October 1993

=== Stations ===
- Clinton County Air Force Base, Ohio, 8 July 1961
- Lockbourne Air Force Base, Ohio, 1 October 1971

Renamed Rickenbacker Air Force Base, 18 May 1974
Renamed Rickenbacker Air National Guard Base, 1 April 1980 – 1 October 1993

=== Aircraft ===
- KC-97F/G Stratotanker, 1961-1965
- KC-97L Stratotanker, 1965-1975
- KC-135A Stratotanker, 1975-1984
- KC-135E Stratotanker, 1984-1991
- KC-135R Stratotanker, 1991–Present

=== Decorations ===
- Air Force Outstanding Unit Award
- Air Force Outstanding Unit Award, 5 June 1967 – 10 May 1968; DAF S.O. GB-157, 1 March 1969.
- Air Force Outstanding Unit Award, First Oak Leaf Cluster, 11 May 1968 – 30 June 1975; DAF S.O. GB-558, 15 July 1977.
