= 180th Fighter Wing =

180th Fighter Wing

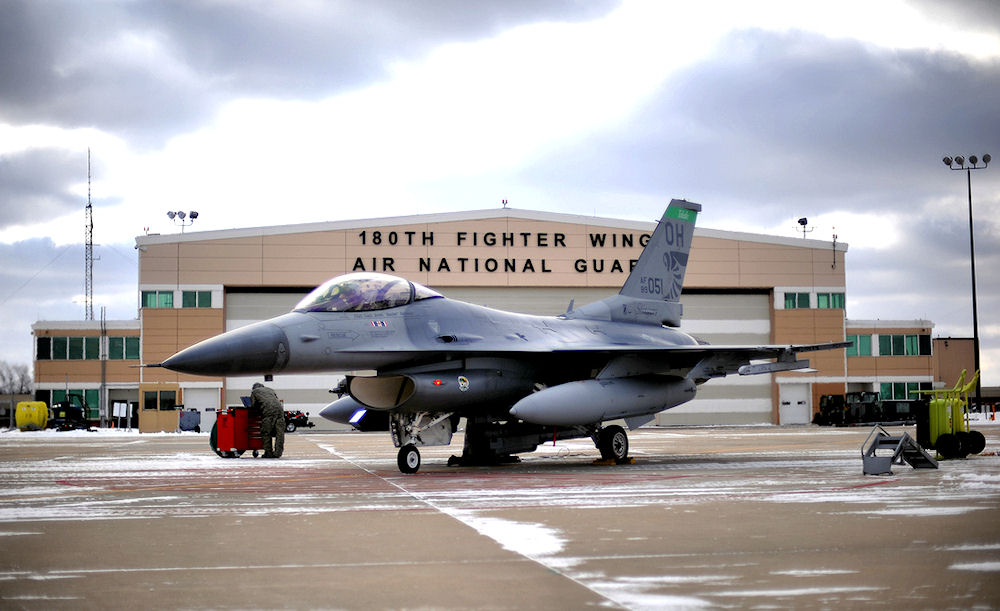
- F-16 Fighting Falcon from the 180th Fighter Wing, Ohio ANG (Note: Note green stripe on tail denoting 112th Fighter Squadron.)
- Active: 1962–present
- Country: United States
- Allegiance: Ohio
- Branch: Air National Guard
- Type: Wing
- Part of: Ohio Air National Guard
- Garrison/HQ: Toledo Air National Guard Base, Ohio
- Nickname: Stingers
- Motto: We Citizens Serve Voluntarily

Commanders
- Current commander: Col. Curtis W. Voltz

Insignia
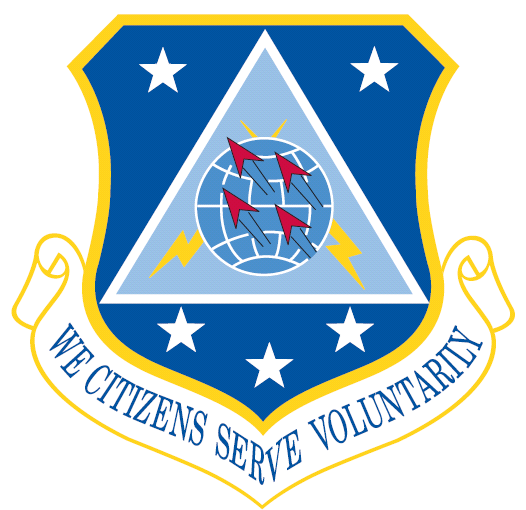
- 180th Fighter Wing emblem
- Tail code: OH
- Tail band

The 180th Fighter Wing is a unit of the Ohio Air National Guard, stationed at Toledo Air National Guard Base, Ohio. If activated to federal service, the Wing is gained by the United States Air Force Air Combat Command.

The 112th Fighter Squadron, assigned to the Wing's 180th Operations Group, is a descendant organization of the World War I 112th Aero Squadron, established on 18 August 1917. It was reformed on 20 June 1927, as the 112th Observation Squadron, and is one of the 29 original National Guard Observation Squadrons of the United States Army National Guard formed before World War II.

== Mission ==
The mission of the 180th Fighter Wing is to train, organize, and equip expeditionary war fighters to deploy, fight, and win worldwide, with minimum response time, in cases of national emergency or war. The unit supports state and local contingencies when directed by the Governor of Ohio.

== Units ==
The 180th Fighter Wing consists of the following units:

- 180th Operations Group

112th Fighter Squadron

- 180th Maintenance Group
- 180th Mission Support Group
- 180th Medical Group

== History ==
On 15 October 1962, the Ohio Air National Guard 112th Tactical Fighter Squadron was authorized to expand to a group level, and the 180th Tactical Fighter Group was established by the National Guard Bureau. The 112th TFS becoming the group's flying squadron. Other squadrons assigned into the group were the 180th Headquarters, 180th Material Squadron (Maintenance), 180th Combat Support Squadron, and the 180th USAF Dispensary.

Upon activation, the 180th was assigned to the 121st Tactical Fighter Wing at Lockbourne Air Force Base.

=== Tactical Air Command ===
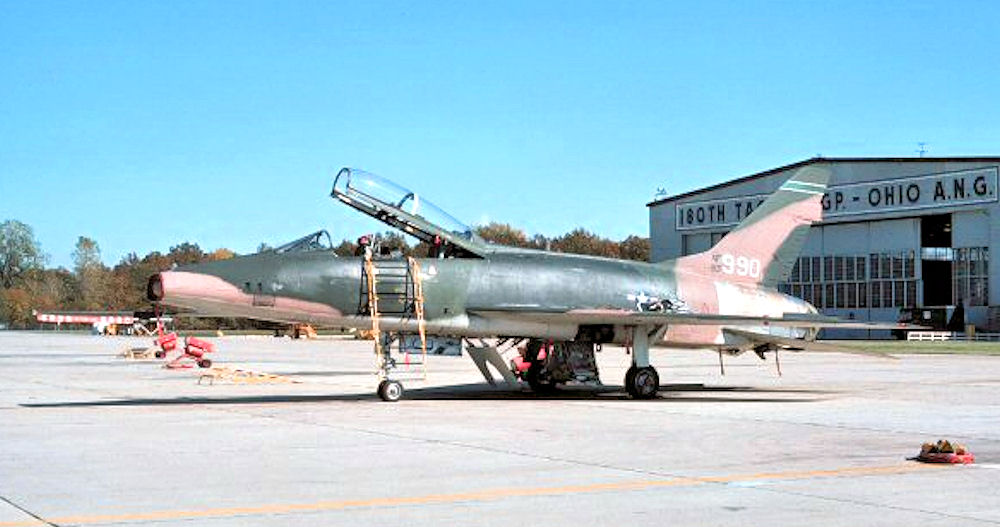
112th Tactical Fighter Squadron - North American F-100F-15-NA Super Sabre 56-3990 about 1975

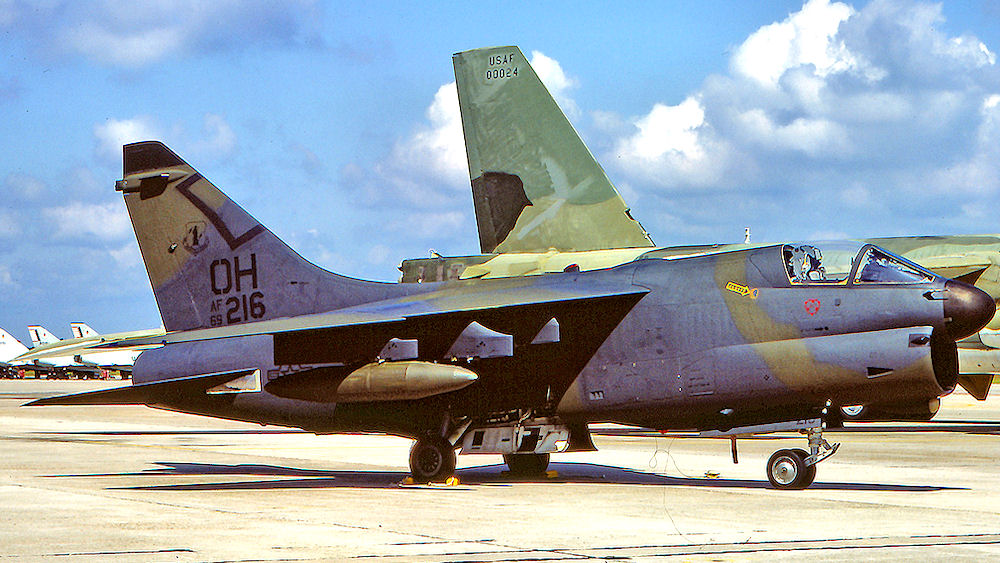
112th TFS Ling-Temco-Vought A-7D Corsair II 69-6216 in 1991, just before its retirement to AMARC.

The group performed normal peacetime training throughout the 1960s. Individual squadron members volunteered for duty during the Vietnam War, however the unit was not federalized in 1968 as the F-84F Thunderjets flown by the 112th TFS were not considered front line combat aircraft. In 1971, the squadron retired its Thunderstreaks and converted to the F-100 Super Sabre as a result of the American draw-down from the Vietnam War. In 1975, the 112th began a NATO commitment, deploying five F-100s to Ramstein Air Base, West Germany 9–25 October 1975 for Operation Coronet Razor.

In the summer of 1979, the F-100s were retired, being replaced with A-7D Corsair II subsonic tactical close air support aircraft from Tactical Air Command units that were converting to the new A-10 Thunderbolt II. The aircraft had excellent accuracy with the aid of an automatic electronic navigation and weapons delivery system. Although designed primarily as a ground attack aircraft, it also had limited air-to-air combat capability. It continued its NATO commitment, deploying six A-7D aircraft to RAF Sculthorpe, England in April 1983 for Operation Coronet Miami; eight A-7Ds in June–July 1986 for Coronet Pine, and thirteen A-7Ds in May–June 1989 for Coronet Pine. The 180th Tactical Fighter Group received the Air Force Outstanding Unit Award in 1985 and again in 1990. In 1989, while deployed at Panama for a Coronet Cove deployment, 180th A-7s were employed during Operation Just Cause.

==== Air Combat Command ====
The 112th TFS did not deploy to Saudi Arabia in 1990 during Operation Desert Shield or Operation Desert Storm as the A-7Ds were considered a second-line aircraft. Squadron volunteers, however were deployed to CENTAF during the crisis and subsequent combat operations.

In March 1992, the 180th adopted the USAF Objective Wing organization and became simply the 180th Fighter Group; the 112th as a Fighter Squadron. On 1 June of that year, Tactical Air Command was inactivated as part of the Air Force restructuring after the end of the Cold War. Air Combat Command (ACC) became the gaining major command for the 180th. Another event in 1992 was the retirement of the A-7Ds, being replaced by Block 25 F-16C/D Fighting Falcons.

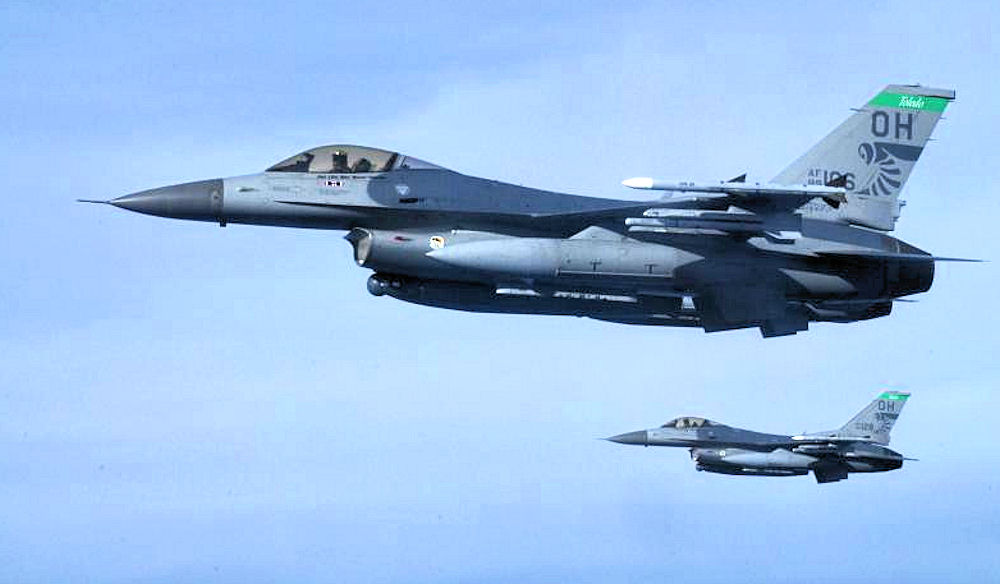
USAF F-16C block 42s #89-2106 & #89-2128 from the 112th FS fly over Southern Ohio on 29 October 2009.

The first F-16 to arrive with the 112th FS was a two-seat model, F-16D #83-1175, which was the first F-16D to come off the production line at Fort Worth. It came from the 312th Tactical Fighter Training Squadron at Luke Air Force Base, Arizona on the rare leap year date 29 February 1992. F-16s continued to arrive and the last A-7D departed on 18 May 1992. Many of the block 25s that came from the 363d Tactical Fighter Wing at Shaw AFB, South Carolina were Desert Storm veterans.

The squadron didn't operate the block 25 for very long. Starting in very early 1994 the squadron gave up its block 25s, which it had only flown for a year, for the much more modern block 42s. The block 25s were sent to various units but mostly to Luke. A large amount of the block 42s came from Shaw AFB, South Carolina where that base was converting to the block 50.

On 1 October 1995, in accordance with the Air Force One Base-One Wing directive, the 180th Fighter Group was expanded and changed in status to the 180th Fighter Wing. Under the Objective Wing organization, the 112th Fighter Squadron was assigned to the 180th Operations Group. Support groups to the wing were the 180th Maintenance Group, 180th Mission Support Group and the 180th Medical Group.

In mid-1996, the Air Force, in response to budget cuts, and changing world situations, began experimenting with Air Expeditionary organizations. The Air Expeditionary Force (AEF) concept was developed that would mix Active-Duty, Reserve and Air National Guard elements into a combined force. Instead of entire permanent units deploying as "Provisional" as in the 1991 Gulf War, Expeditionary units are composed of "aviation packages" from several wings, including active-duty Air Force, the Air Force Reserve Command and the Air National Guard, would be married together to carry out the assigned deployment rotation.

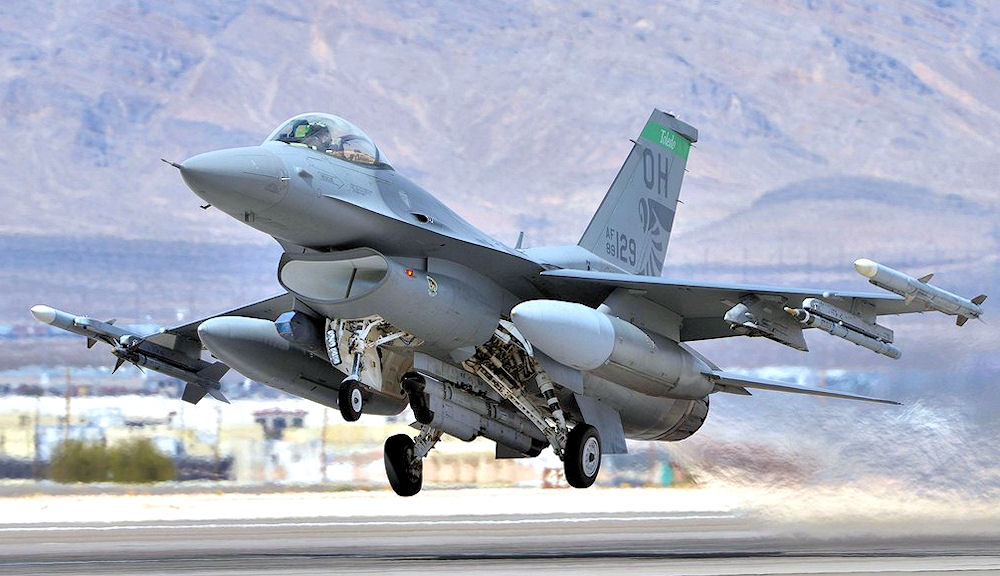
112th Fighter Squadron - General Dynamics F-16C Block 42G Fighting Falcon 89-2129

In October 1996, the 112th Expeditionary Fighter Squadron was first formed from 162d FW personnel and eight aircraft and deployed to Incirlik Air Base, Turkey. The 112th joined with the 124th (Iowa Air National Guard) and the 125th Expeditionary Fighter Squadrons (Oklahoma Air National Guard) as part of a "rainbow" deployment to support Operation Provide Comfort. In January 1997, this changed to Operation Northern Watch just prior to the unit's return to Toledo to enforce the No-Fly-Zones over Iraq. More Operation Northern Watch deployments were made to Incirlik AB by the 112th EFS in 1998, 1999, 2000 and 2002 respectively. The 112th EFS deployed to Al Jaber Air Base, Kuwait, for Operation Southern Watch in 2001.

After the events of 11 September 2001 unit members have volunteered to support both Operation Iraqi Freedom and Operation Enduring Freedom in 2005 and again for Operation Iraqi Freedom again in 2007.

==== NORAD Air Defense ====
In its 2005 BRAC Recommendations, DoD recommended to realign Des Moines Air National Guard Base, Iowa. The F-16 aircraft currently assigned to the 132d Fighter Wing at Des Moines would be redistributed to the 180th Fighter Wing (nine aircraft) Des Moines' F-16s would be distributed to Toledo to support the Homeland Defense Air Sovereignty Alert (ASA) mission and to consolidate the precision-guided weapon employment capability that exists in the Air National Guard.

In August 2008 the 112th Fighter Squadron took over the alert role for the region from the Detroit-based Michigan 107th Fighter Squadron which was converting to the A-10 Thunderbolt II in the next year. The 112th officially took over on 2 October 2008.

Operation Atlantic Resolve Operation Atlantic Resolve refers to military activities in response to Russian operations in Ukraine, mainly the War in Donbas. It was funded under the European Deterrence Initiative. In the wake of Russia's 2014 invasion of Ukraine, the US and the UK took several immediate steps to enhance the deterrence posture along the eastern flank of the North Atlantic Treaty Organization, including augmenting the air, ground and naval presence in the region, and enhancing previously scheduled exercises.

=== Lineage ===
- Established as the 180th Tactical Fighter Group and allotted to Ohio ANG, in 1962

Activated and extended federal recognition on 15 October 1962
Redesignated 180th Fighter Group on 15 March 1992
Redesignated 180th Fighter Wing on 11 October 1995

=== Assignments ===
- 121st Tactical Fighter Wing (later 121st Air Refueling Wing), 15 October 1962
- Ohio Air National Guard, 11 October 1995

Gained by: Air Combat Command

=== Components ===
- 180th Operations Group, 11 October 1995 – present
- 112th Tactical Fighter Squadron (later 112th Fighter Squadron, 15 October 1962 – 11 October 1995

=== Stations ===
- Toledo Express Airport, 15 October 1962

Designated: Toledo Air National Guard Base, 1991-present

=== Aircraft ===
- F-84F Thunderstreak, 1962-1971
- F-100D/F Super Sabre, 1971-1979
- A-7D/K Corsair II, 1979-1991
- Block 25 F-16C/D Fighting Falcon, 1991-1994
- Block 42 F-16C/D Fighting Falcon, 1994–present
