= Mansfield Lahm Regional Airport =

- IATA: MFD; ICAO: KMFD; FAA LID: MFD

Summary
- Airport type: Public
- Owner: City of Mansfield
- Serves: Mansfield, Ohio
- Location: Mansfield, Ohio
- Elevation AMSL: 1,297 ft (395 m)
- Coordinates: 40°49′17″N 82°31′0″W
- Website: https://www.ci.mansfield.oh.us/index.php/lahm-airport

Maps
- Airport diagram
- Location within Ohio Location within the United States

Runways
Direction	Length		Surface
Direction	ft	m	Surface
14/32	9,001	2,744	Asphalt
5/23	6,819	2,078	Asphalt

Statistics (2023)
- Aircraft operations (year ending January 31, 2023): 18,780
- Based aircraft: 75
- Source: Federal Aviation Administration

Mansfield Lahm Regional Airport (IATA: MFD, ICAO: KMFD, FAA LID: MFD) is three miles (4.8 km) north of Mansfield, in Richland County, Ohio. By car the airport is an hour away from Cleveland and Columbus, near Interstate 71, US Route 30, and State Route 13.

== History ==
The airport is named for Frank P. Lahm. Lahm was a balloonist who trained his son in the field where the airport is now located. His son won the first Gordon Bennett balloon race to Paris to England, eventually worked with the Wright Brothers, and was the first military passenger on an airplane.

Efforts to build an airport in Mansfield were promoted by J.R. "Bud" Harrington, who first landed at the site in 1933.

A restaurant called the Sky Club and built by James R. Harrington opened at the airport in May 1946.

The first airline flights were TWA Douglas DC-3s in 1947; Lake Central replaced TWA in 1953, and successor Allegheny served Mansfield until 1969, when Allegheny Commuter took over.

The Mansfield Aviation Club was founded at the airport in 1949 and provides scholarships and celebrations.

The Air National Guard base sought to acquire an additional 30 acres (12 ha) acres from a nearby industrial park on which to expand in June 1984.

Niss Aviation announced plans to build a new hangar next to the airport terminal in November 2020.

In 2021, the airport received an annual federal subsidy over several years from the Bipartisan Infrastructure Investment and Jobs Act.

In 2023, the city of Mansfield sued 81 companies and individuals over possible contamination at Mansfield airport. The issue is primarily centered around chemicals in foam being used by the Air National Guard's firefighters. The city claims that the military's products were defective and unreasonable dangerous. The suit is ongoing.

Plans for a new restaurant at the airport were announced in November 2023.

== Military facilities ==
The airport is home to the Mansfield Lahm Air National Guard Base and the 179th Airlift Wing (179 AW), an Ohio Air National Guard unit operationally gained by the Air Mobility Command (AMC). The unit has about 1000 personnel, of which about 300 are full-time Active Guard and Reserve (AGR) and Air Reserve Technician (ART) personnel and the remaining 760 are traditional part-time air national guardsmen.

The wing has been active at Mansfield Lahm since its establishment in 1948, operating various fighter aircraft until 1976, when it transitioned to an airlift mission with C-130 Hercules aircraft. The wing has performed service during Operations Desert Shield, Desert Storm, Southern Watch, Noble Eagle, Enduring Freedom and Iraqi Freedom. Retiring their C-130's in 2009, the 179th flew the C-27 Spartan until 2013, at which time it began transitioning back to the C-130.

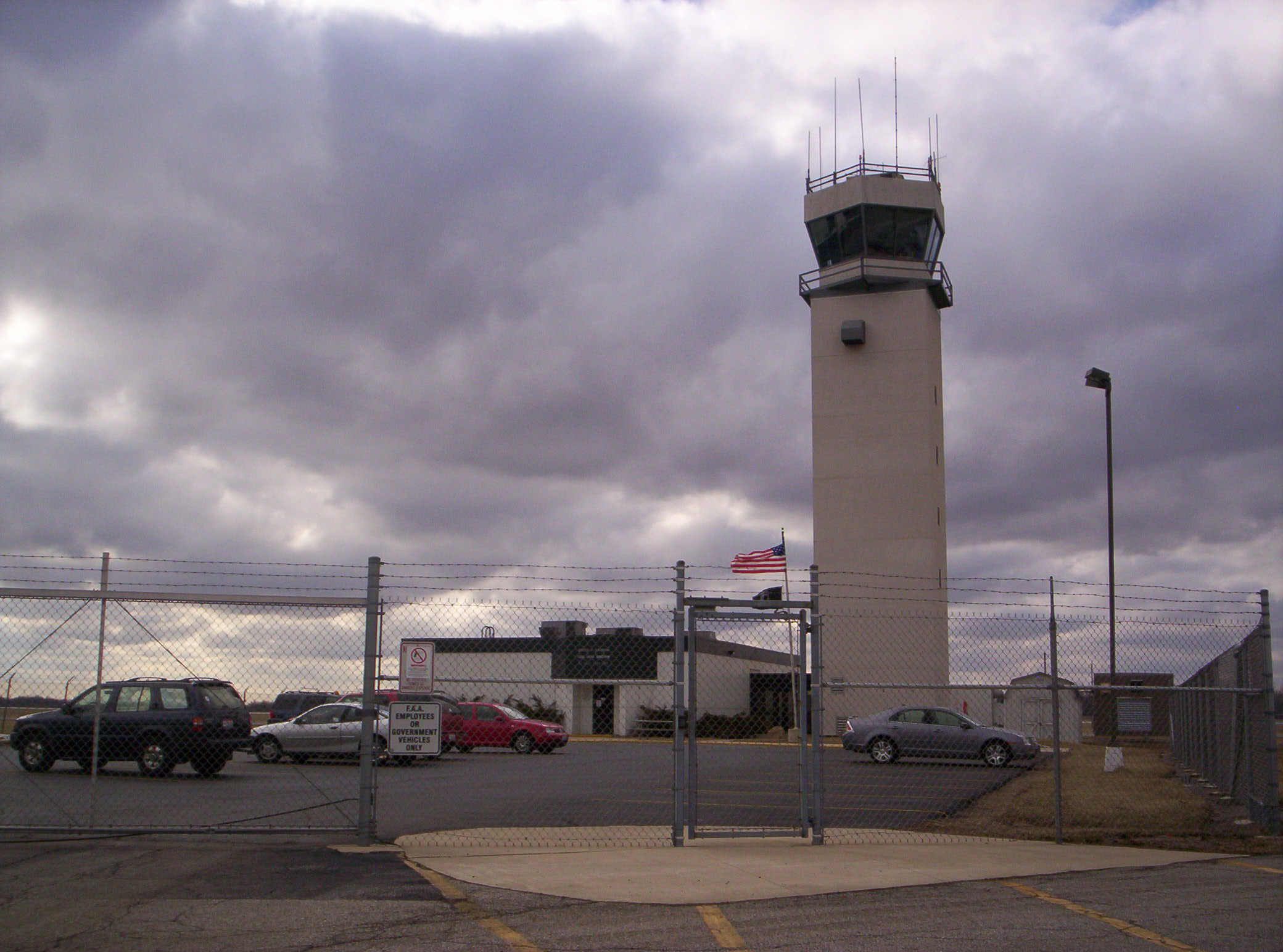
Control Tower at Mansfield Terminal at MFD

== Facilities and aircraft ==
=== Facilities ===
The airport covers 2,340 acres (950 ha) and has two asphalt runways: 14/32 is 9,001 by 150 feet (2,744 m × 46 m) and 5/23 is 6,819 by 150 feet (2,078 m × 46 m). The airport adjoins several industrial parks.

- Niss Aviation provides services as a fixed-base operator. It purchased Richland Aviation, the former FBO, in 2021. The FBO offers services such as fuel, general maintenance, hangars, courtesy transportation, a crew lounge, snooze rooms, shower, a conference room, and more.
- Avit Flight Academy provides flight instruction at the airport.
- Modern Avionics and Maintenance, Inc. and The Airplane Clinic provide maintenance and avionics work.

Other companies with a presence at the airport include C&G Associates, Gorman-Rupp and Next Generation Films.

The airport can handle large aircraft, including the USAF C-5 and the Antonov 124-100.

In 2022, the airport received nearly $7 million in funding to rehabilitate its facilities. The overflow parking ramp and certain taxiways and taxilanes were upgraded.

In 2023, the airport received funding that is intended to go towards building a restaurant at the airport. The airport plans to begin construction in spring 2024. The facility will include a dining room, bar, and outdoor patio, and the restaurant will be open to both pilots and the general public.

=== Aircraft ===
In the year ending January 31, 2023, the airport had 18,780 aircraft operations, average 51 per day: 85% general aviation, 7% air taxi, 8% military, and <1% airline. 75 aircraft were based at this airport at the time: 51 single-engine and 11 multi-engine airplanes, 8 military, 4 jets, and 1 ultralight.

== Events ==
The airport hosts regular events, most notably an Airport Day that features helicopter and airplane rides, a kids zone, interactive games, food trucks, vendor booths, and a car show. In 2023, the Airport Day featured a drone show, the first in the region.

The airport also often hosts historic warbird aircraft displays.

== Incidents and accidents ==
- On January 2, 1989, a Mitsubishi MU-2B on approach to Mansfield crashed due to spatial disorientation while trying to change communications frequencies during an instrument approach into Mansfield.
- On November 30, 1996, an Aero Commander 681 collided with power lines and terrain while on an instrument approach at Mansfield Lahm Airport. After being cleared for the approach, the pilot advised the tower that he was on the wrong course, and requested vectors for another approach. After being a cleared for a second approach, the pilot was cleared to land, but he could not see the runway and requested a third approach. The pilot got the runway in sight on the third approach and was again cleared to land, but the air traffic controller noticed the airplane descending quickly and bobbing up and down on final. It suddenly flew up in the air and flipped into the ground. The probable causes of the accident were found to be the pilot's early descent below the minimum descent altitude while preparing to land from an instrument approach and his failure to maintain adequate altitude and clearance from obstructions.
- On November 11, 2001, a Piper PA-28 Cherokee on approach to Mansfield crashed short of the runway while trying to divert to Lahm Municipal airport in response to engine problems. The pilot proceeded directly to the airport but crashed before reaching the runway. The probable cause of the accident was found to be the pilot's improper use of carburetor heat, and subsequent forced landing. Factors were the carburetor icing condition, night conditions, trees, and the pilot's impairment from ingestion of an over-the-counter antihistamine.
- On June 21, 2003, a Piper PA-32 Saratoga was substantially damaged during a landing at Mansfield Lahm Municipal Airport. a witness reported the airplane flared too high and touched down on the left side of the runway. The pilot reported that the aircraft was pushed to the side of the runway by wind, touched down on grass next to the paved runway surface, and struck runway lights and signs before returning to the runway. The probable cause of the accident was found to be the pilot's inadequate compensation for wind conditions and his failure to maintain directional control during the landing.
- On July 1, 2004, a Zenith STOL CH 701, registered N98EH, failed to maintain directional control during a precautionary landing. The aircraft suffered a loss of oil pressure and partial loss of engine power, due to unapproved maintenance modification. One injury was reported.
- On April 14, 2016, CZAW SportCruiser impacted runway 32 during landing at Mansfield Lahm Regional Airport. The nose landing gear separated at a weld, which resulted in the airplane nose impacting the runway. The pilot stated that after the main landing gear touched down, he began to ease back pressure on the control stick. As the back pressure eased, the nose wheel landing gear strut separated from the airplane. The airplane slid on the runway for about 150 feet and the nosewheel/strut remained about 30 feet behind the airplane and along the runway centerline. The probable cause of the accident was found to be the pilot's failure to inspect the nose landing gear, which resulted in a crack going undetected and the subsequent separation of the gear at the weld area during landing.

== See also ==
- List of airports in Ohio
