= Rickenbacker Air National Guard Base =

U.S. military base

- Near Columbus, Ohio in the United States
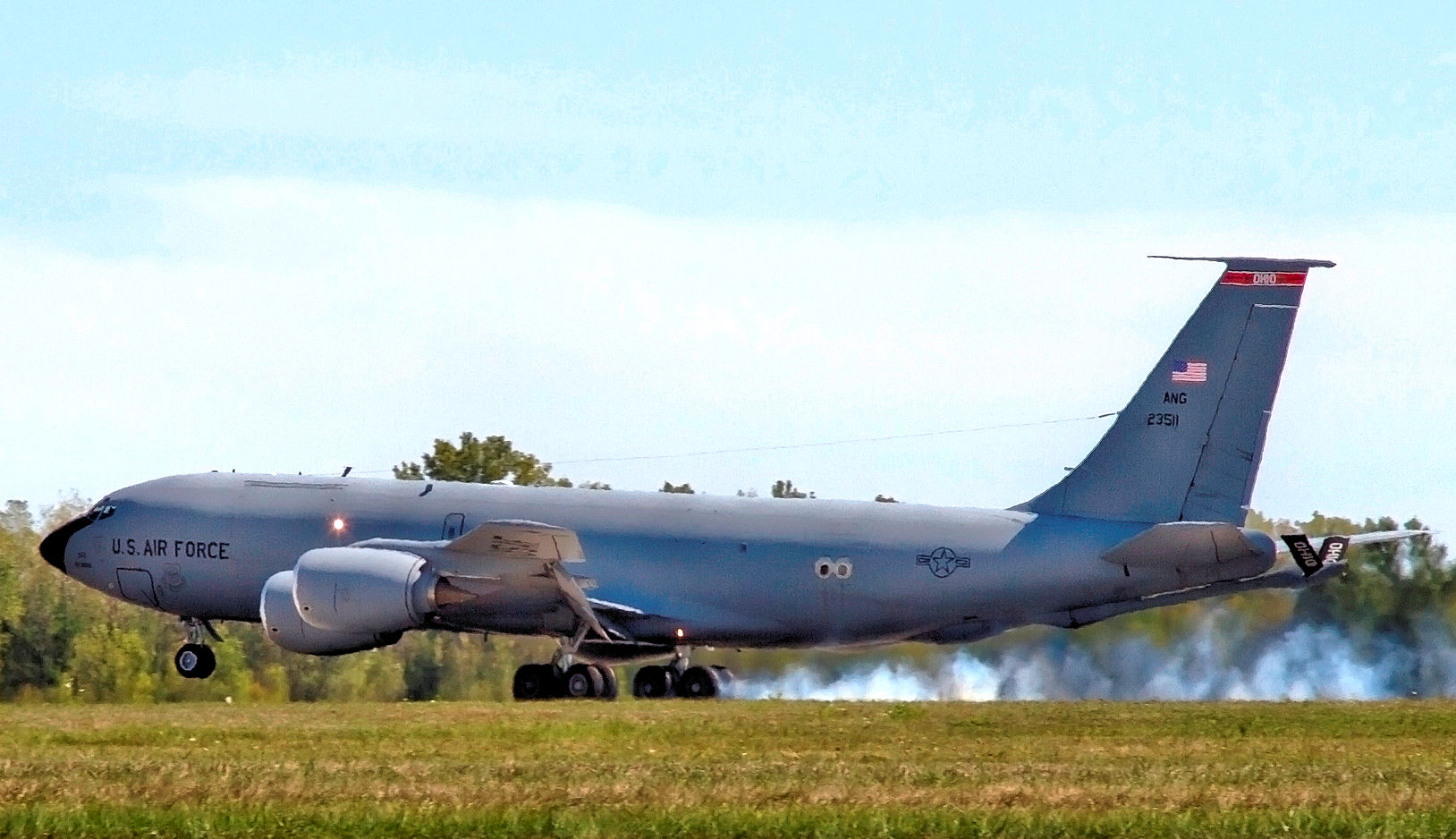
- A KC-135R Stratotanker of the Ohio Air National Guard's 121st Air Refuelling Wing touches down at Rickenbacker ANGB during 2012.

Site information
- Type: Air National Guard Base
- Owner: Department of Defense
- Operator: US Air Force (USAF)
- Controlled by: Ohio Air National Guard (ANG)
- Condition: Operational
- Website: www.121arw.ang.af.mil

Location
- Location in the United States
- Coordinates: 39°48′49″N 082°56′48″W

Site history
- Built: 1940s (as Lockbourne Army Airfield)
- In use: 1940s – present

Garrison information
- Current commander: Colonel David B. Johnson
- Garrison: 121st Air Refueling Wing

Airfield information
- Identifiers: IATA: LCK, ICAO: KLCK, FAA LID: LCK, WMO: 724285
- Elevation: 226.7 metres (744 ft) AMSL
Runways
Direction	Length and surface
5R/23L	3,688.6 metres (12,102 ft) Asphalt/concrete
5L/23R	3,627.7 metres (11,902 ft) Asphalt
- Airfield shared with Rickenbacker International Airport. Source: Federal Aviation Administration

Rickenbacker Air National Guard Base is an Ohio Air National Guard installation at Rickenbacker International Airport near Lockbourne in southern Franklin County. The base was named for the famous early aviator and Columbus native Eddie Rickenbacker.

Rickenbacker ANGB is the home of the 121st Air Refueling Wing (121 ARW), an Air National Guard (ANG) unit flying the KC-135R Stratotanker aircraft that also serves as the host wing for the installation. When placed in federal service with the United States Air Force, the wing is operationally-gained by the Air Mobility Command (AMC). Rickenbacker ANGB operates at the airport as a tenant of the Columbus Regional Airport Authority, sharing the facility with commercial airlines and other civilian aircraft operators. The air base is also a joint military facility whose own tenant activities include the Ohio Army National Guard's Army Aviation Support Facility #2, Navy Reserve and Marine Corps Reserve units, and associated facilities.

Rickenbacker ANGB Composite Squadron (OH-121), a Civil Air Patrol squadron, also operates on the base.

== History ==
The base was built during World War II as Lockbourne Army Airfield, a U.S. Army Air Forces training base. It became Lockbourne Air Force Base in 1948, a few months after the United States Air Force was established as an independent branch of the U.S. armed forces.

From the base opening in September 1942 with the Air Service Command as the initial base tenant, the Flying Training Command took over the base on January 15, 1943 which placed the base under the Southeast Training Center from then and throughout World War II. The subordinate units on the base were the 97th Service Group and the 374th Air Base Squadron and subordinate units and training units within those commands. The 1171st, 1173rd, and 1174th Pilot Transition Training Squadrons with student pilots trained with four engined bombers such as the Boeing B-17 Flying Fortress as one of the primary missions of the base. Other training was also instructed on base to include the all black 2026th and 2027th Quartermaster Truck Companies (Aviation) and 2054th and 2055th Quartermaster Companies.

In March 1946, the all black 477th Composite Wing commanded by then Colonel Benjamin O. Davis, Jr. took over the base after the previous tenants of the Flying Training Command ceased operations there at the end of the war. The wing consisting of the North American B-25 Mitchell equipped 617th and 618th Bomb Squadrons and the Republic P-47N Thunderbolt equipped 99th Fighter Squadron, including support units, had moved from Godman Army Airfield at Fort Knox, Kentucky. On July 1 1947, the 477th Composite Wing was inactivated as the two B-25 medium bomber squadrons were replaced with two more P-47N equipped squadrons, the 100th and 301st fighter squadrons, once again rejoining with the 99th fighter squadron from their days at Ramitelli Air Base, in Italy during WWII, to form the 332nd Fighter Wing. In May 1949 members of the three fighter squadrons were chosen to compete in the first post WWII Gunnery Meet in the Conventional category at Las Vegas Army Airfield (now Nellis Air Force Base) Nevada. The 332nd FW won that event and the trophy is currently on display at the National Museum of the United States Air Force at Wright Patterson Air Force Base, in Dayton, OH. Shortly after, in July 1949 the wing was inactivated upon the desegregation of the armed forces signed by executive order by President Harry S. Truman with the men of the wing being transferred to other Air Force base assignments throughout the United States and overseas.

In September 1951, the 91st Strategic Reconnaissance Wing (Medium) of the Strategic Air Command (SAC) moved to Lockbourne AFB from Barksdale AFB, Louisiana and operated B-45 and RB-45 Tornado and B-47 and YRB-47 Stratojet aircraft, performing a worldwide aerial reconnaissance and mapping mission. The wing was inactivated in November 1957.

In April 1958, the 301st Bombardment Wing arrived at Lockbourne AFB, assuming host wing responsibilities and flying the B-47, EB-47, and RB-47 Stratojet and KC-97 Stratofreighter aircraft. In 1964, with the impending retirement of all B-47 variant aircraft from SAC and the ongoing transfer of KC-97 aircraft to the Air Force Reserve and Air National Guard, the wing transitioned to the KC-135A Stratotanker was redesignated as the 301st Air Refueling Wing (301 ARW). Following the Tonkin Gulf Resolution, the wing's KC-135 aircraft routinely deployed to Southeast Asia for support of the air war in Vietnam.

In 1974, Lockbourne AFB was renamed Rickenbacker AFB in honor of Columbus, Ohio native and World War I U.S. Army Air Service fighter ace and Medal of Honor recipient, Eddie Rickenbacker.

After the end of Vietnam War, the Air Force shrank dramatically; it shed some SAC wings and closed active bases or transferred them to the Air Force Reserve or Air National Guard. The 301 ARW was inactivated and its KC-135s distributed to various Air National Guard units on 30 November 1979; on 1 April 1980, the base was transferred to a combination of the Ohio Air National Guard with the 160th Air Refueling Group (160 ARG) as the host unit, and the civilian governmental agency known as the Rickenbacker Port Authority, now the Columbus Regional Airport Authority.
