= 117th Air Refueling Wing =

117th Air Refueling Wing

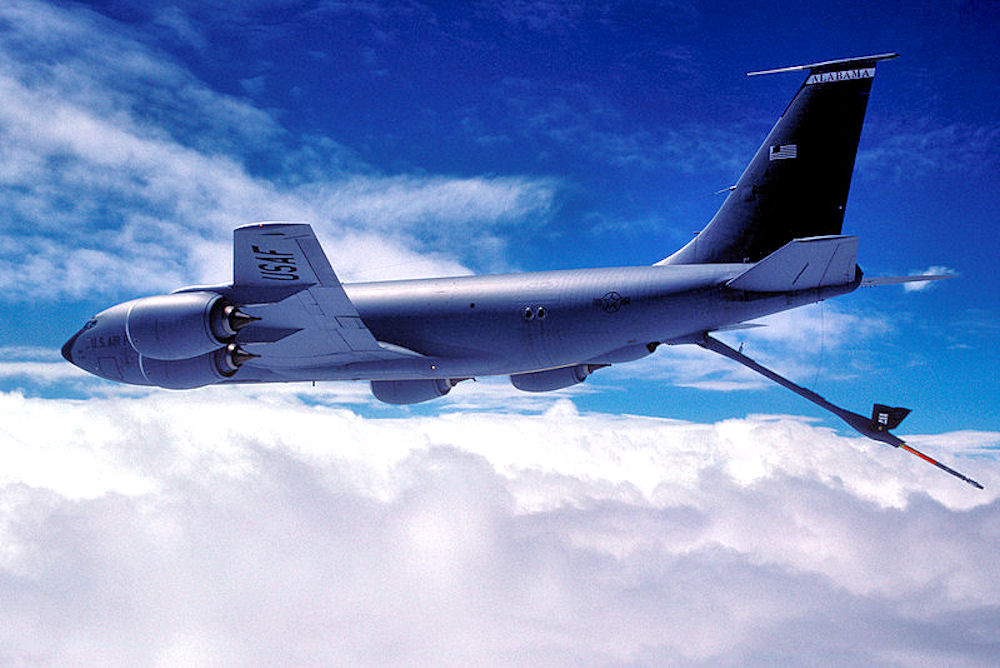
- 106th ARS KC-135 with refueling boom extended
- Active: 1950–1952; 1952–present
- Country: United States
- Allegiance: Alabama
- Branch: Air National Guard
- Type: Wing
- Role: Aerial refueling
- Part of: Alabama Air National Guard
- Garrison/HQ: Sumpter Smith Air National Guard Base, Alabama
- Nicknames: formerly "Recce Rebels","Dixie Refuelers"
- Mottos: Defend and Serve

Commanders
- Commander: Col. Michael Adams

Insignia
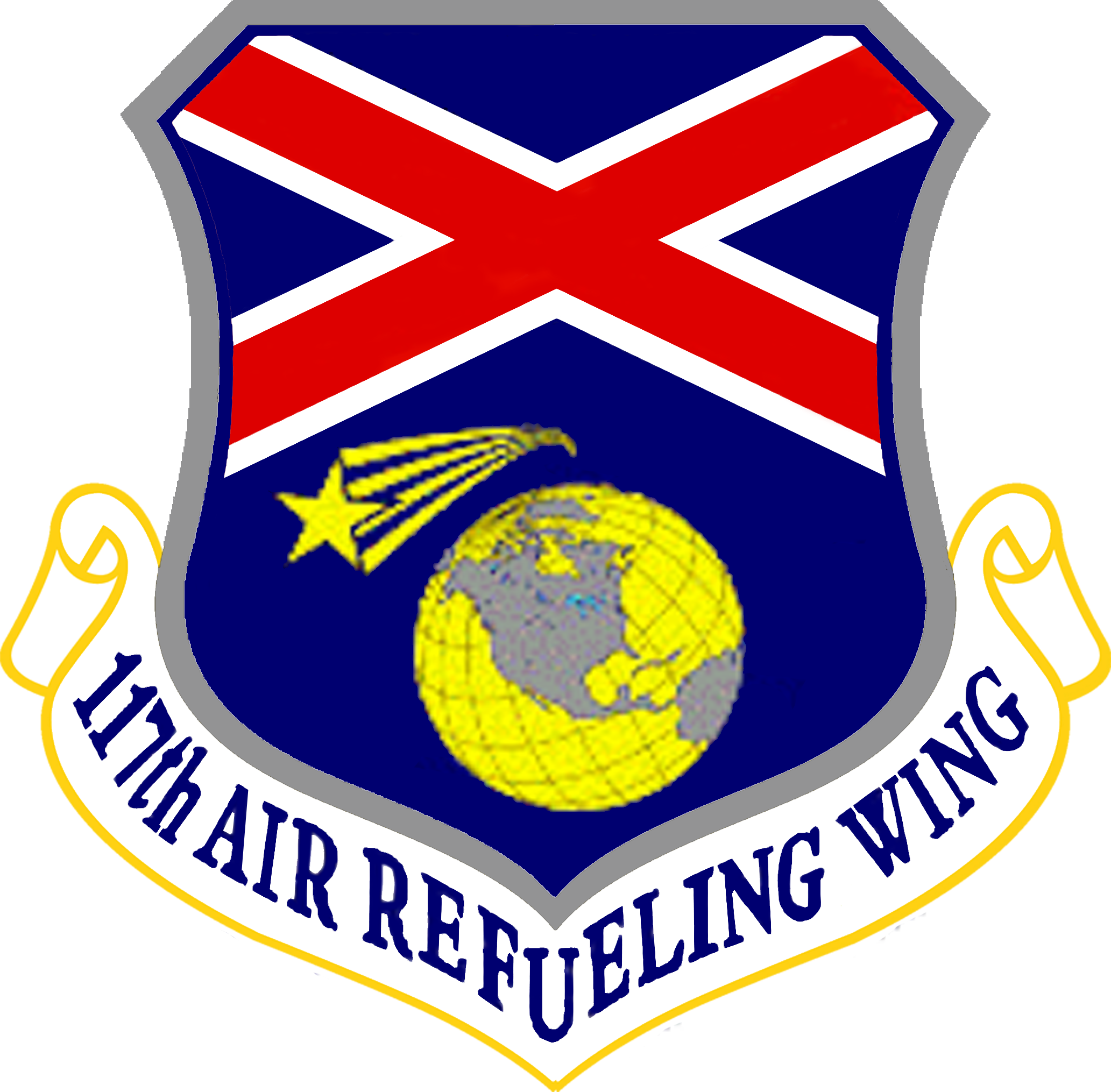
- 117th Air Refueling Wing emblem

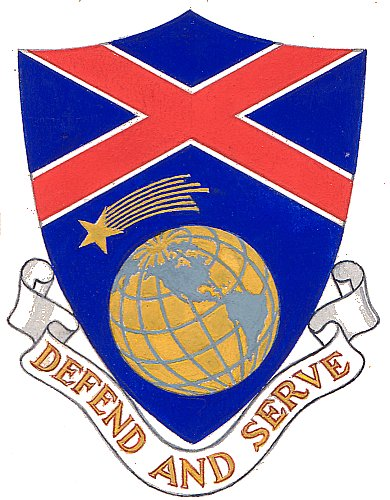
- Original 117th Tactical Reconnaissance Wing emblem

- Tail stripe

Aircraft flown
- Tanker: KC-135R Stratotanker

The 117th Air Refueling Wing is a unit of the Alabama Air National Guard, stationed at Sumpter Smith Air National Guard Base Birmingham, Alabama. If activated to federal service, it is gained by the United States Air Force Air Mobility Command.

The 106th Air Refueling Squadron, assigned to the Wings 117th Operations Group, is a descendant organization of the World War I 106th Aero Squadron, established on 27 August 1917. It was reactivated in 1922, and as the 106th Observation Squadron was one of 29 National Guard observation squadrons formed before World War II.

== Overview ==
The 117th Air Refueling Wing flies the Boeing KC-135R Stratotanker. Its mission is to train and equip combat ready aircrews and support personnel to perform worldwide air refueling and airlift missions. Combat ready civil engineering, support services, medical, personnel, communications and Intelligence technical support packages of the wing are available for worldwide assignment. the wing supports state and local contingencies when directed by the Governor of Alabama.

== Units ==
The 117th Air Refueling Wing consists of the following units:

- 117th Operations Group

106th Air Refueling Squadron
99th Air Refueling Squadron

- 117th Maintenance Group
- 117th Mission Support Group
- 117th Medical Group

== History ==
=== Background ===
The 117th Fighter Group was extended federal recognition on 1 October 1947 at Birmingham Municipal Airport, Alabama. In the fall of 1950, the group was called to active federal service. The group moved to Lawson Air Force Base, Georgia and began to train as a tactical reconnaissance unit. However, the group and its support organizations were not organized under the Wing Base organization of the regular Air Force, which combined tactical and support organizations under a single headquarters.

=== Korean War and activation ===
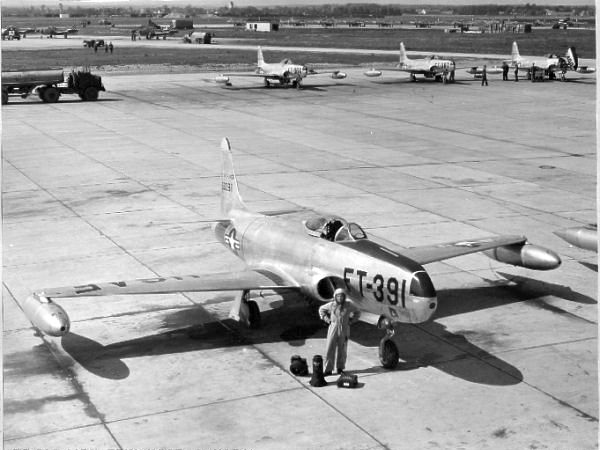
Lockheed RF-80C-11-LO Shooting Star Serial 45–8391 in the foreground, along with other RF-80s of the 160th Tactical Recon Squadron, 1952. (Photo taken at Neubiberg AB, West Germany)

To provide a single headquarters for operational and support units of the 117th Group, the Air Force organized the 117th Tactical Reconnaissancw Wing at Lawson at the end of November 1950, assigning the 117th Tactical Reconnaissance Group, along with the new 117th Maintenance and Supply, 117th Air Base and 117th Medical Groups.

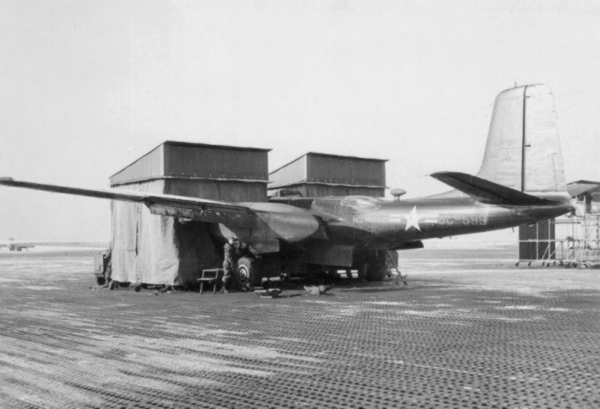
Douglas A/RB-26C-40-DT Invader serial 44-35599 of the 117th TRW in a temporary wooden nose "hangar", January 1953. Notice the temporary Pierced Steel Planking used for the parking apron with the snow and ice. This aircraft was sold to France in September 1956. It was eventually withdrawn from use in May 1967 and scrapped.

At Lawson, the 112th Tactical Reconnaissance Squadron retained its existing Douglas RB-26C Invaders, becoming the wing's night reconnaissance unit. Tactical Air Command equipped the 157th and 160th Tactical Reconnaissance Squadrons with Lockheed RF-80A Shooting Star daylight photo-reconnaissance jet aircraft. The wing then began what was then believed to be a short transition training period. The original plan was to deploy the 117th to France and reinforce United States Air Forces in Europe at a new base in France, Toul-Rosières Air Base. However Toul Air Base was still under construction, and delays in France for several reasons forced the 117th to remain at Lawson for over a year until finally receiving deployment orders in January 1952.

The 117th arrived at Toul Air Base on 27 January 1952. However at the time of the Wing's arrival, Toul consisted of a sea of mud, and the new jet runway was breaking up and could not support safe flying. The commander of the 117th deemed it uninhabitable and its flying squadrons of the wing were ordered dispersed to West Germany. The 112th Squadron was transferred to Wiesbaden Air Base, the 157th to Fürstenfeldbruck Air Base, and the 160th to Neubiberg Air Base, all in West Germany. The non-flying headquarters and support organizations remained at Toul.

The mission of the 117th was to provide tactical, visual, photographic and electronic reconnaissance by both day and night, as was required by the military forces within the European command. The RF-80's were responsible for the daylight operations; the RB-26s for night photography. In June 1952, the 117th was involved in Exercise June Primer. This exercise took place in an area bordered by a line drawn from Cherbourg Naval Base to Geneva in the east and in the west by Swiss, Austrian and Russian Occupation Zone of Germany borders.

The two RF-80 squadrons of the 117th had to complete a number of varying missions, including vertical photography of prospective paratroop air drop zones, oblique photos of the Rhine and Danube river bridges, vertical photography of the airfields of Jever, Faßberg, Celle, Sundorf and Gütersloh and various visual missions on behalf of the Seventh Army, including artillery adjustment for the 816th Field Artillery Battalion. The 157th Squadron had had wire recorders fitted to five of its RF-80's prior to June Primer and these greatly facilitated the latter missions.

By July 1952 facilities at Wiesbaden were becoming very crowded, and it was felt that the B-26's could fly from the primitive conditions at Toul. The 112th returned to Toul, however the jet-engined RF-80's remained in West Germany until a new runway was constructed. On 10 July 1952 the 117th Wing was inactivated and its mission, personnel and equipment was taken over by the newly activated 10th Tactical Reconnaissance Wing. The wing was the allotted to the Air National Guard.

=== Air National Guard service ===
The 117th Tactical Reconnaissance Wing was re-formed at Birmingham. It continued to fly a mix of jet and propeller aircraft until 1957, when new Republic RF-84F Thunderflash jet reconnaissance aircraft, manufactured by Republic for Air National Guard service. The squadron continued to train in tactical reconnaissance missions throughout the 1950s with the Thunderstreaks.

=== 1961 Berlin Crisis ===
The wing was federalized on 1 October 1961 as a result of the 1961 Berlin Crisis. The wing included the 160th Tactical Reconnaissance Squadron from Dannelly Field, the 106th Tactical Reconnaissance Squadron at Birmingham; the 153d Tactical Reconnaissance Squadron of the Mississippi Air National Guard), and the 184th Tactical Reconnaissance Squadron of the Arizona Air National Guard. Due to federal budget restrictions, only the 106th deployed to Dreux-Louvilliers Air Base, France. However elements of the three other squadrons rotated to France as operational components of the 7117th Tactical Wing over the next year and 106th pilots returned to the United States.

On 27 October twenty RF-84Fs were deployed to Dreux, arriving on 3 November. In addition, two Lockheed T-33 "T Bird" jet trainers and one Douglas C-47 Skytrain were deployed as support aircraft. By 22 November, elements of the wing reassembled at the newly reactivated Dreux for an estimated stay of ten months. However, problems developed immediately after their arrival at Dreux. The base had been in standby status for about a year and no longer was used for operational flights.

In any event, the more than one thousand airmen of the wing arrived at a base that had been stripped clean. The French had taken away office desks, telephones and typewriters. The kitchens had not been used for some time, a fact that the quartermasters had not taken into account, so getting the base operational again in the short time available took an all-out effort. A few days after the ground units arrived from Alabama, the first aircraft were prepared for a practice flight. The French Air Traffic Controllers, however, refused permission for take-off. Only after a lot of negotiation were several aircraft allowed to take to the air.

Dreux Air Base came within the Paris Air Traffic Control Area, as did the busy Le Bourget and Orly Airports, and an extra squadron of jet aircraft had not been accounted for in the French air traffic controllers' staffing levels. The safety of civilian air traffic was used to justify denying the Americans permission to fly out of Dreux. Notwithstanding stormy protests by the United States, the RF-84s stayed on the ground. The pilots who had only just completed a risky Atlantic crossing of several thousand kilometers, had to wait in the operations room. In the United States, the Birmingham News daily newspaper reported that 'their boys', after the sudden mobilization and the weeks of preparation, had not been sent to Europe to sit around a French airfield doing nothing.

However, as strongly the Pentagon protested, the French answer remained "non!". Eventually General Reid Doster, commander of the Alabama deployment could do little else but take his aircraft elsewhere. At the end of November 1961 he received permission from the French traffic controllers to go with his aircraft to Chaumont-Semoutiers Air Base, another USAFE in France. Permission was received from the French to move on 8 December 1961, however HQ USAFE insisted that the 7117th Wing headquarters remain at Dreux for airlift traffic. Thus the 106th operated from Chaumont AB, its headquarters remained at Dreux. On 22 July 1962 the 106th returned to Alabama leaving its F-84Fs in France. Dreux was placed back in standby status.

=== Vietnam and late Cold War era ===
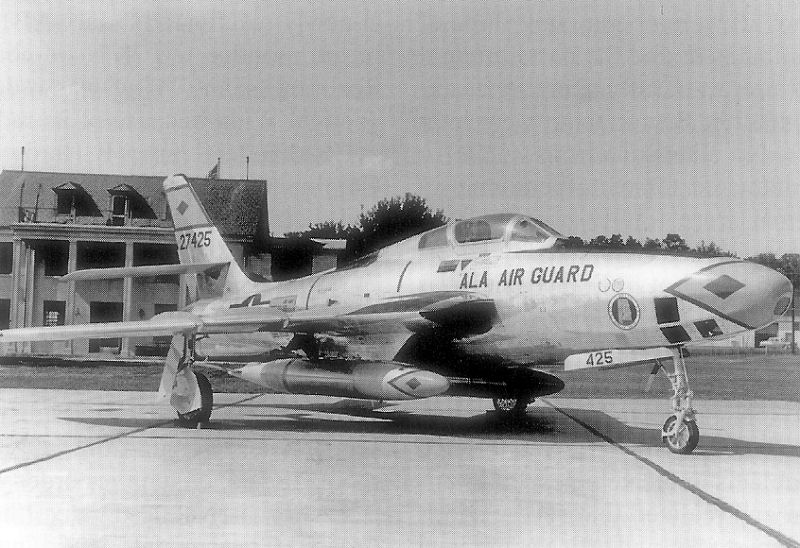
Republic RF-84F-30-RE Thunderflash of the 106th TRS, Alabama Air National Guard, 52-7425

After the squadron re-formed in Birmingham, it re-equipped with RF-84Fs from active-duty squadrons that were receiving the McDonnell RF-101 Voodoo. It continued to fly the Thunderflash reconnaissance aircraft throughout the 1960s. As the RF-84F was not used during the Vietnam War, the 117th Wing was not activated for duty in Southeast Asia, although some pilots from the unit went through transition training to the RF-101C and McDonnell RF-4C Phantom II and were activated for combat duty.

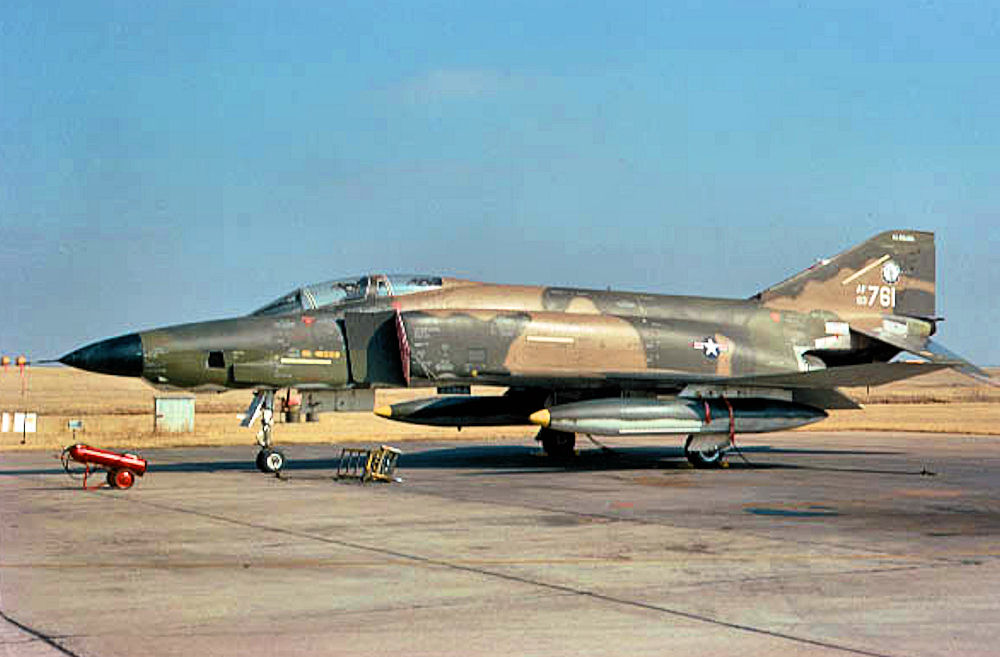
106th TRS RF-4C 66-7761 about 1972, shortly after its transfer from the 432d Tactical Reconnaissance Wing, Udorn RTAFB, Thailand.

In November 1971 the Thunderflashes were retired as they reached the end of their service life and the 117th Group was chosen to be the first Air National Guard unit to receive the RF-4C Phantom II tactical reconnaissance aircraft. The squadron received aircraft being withdrawn from Southeast Asia as part of the United States pullout from the Vietnam War.

On 9 December 1974 the 117th Tactical Reconnaissance Group inactivated, and support organizations were assigned to the new 117th Combat Support Group. The 106th Tactical Reconnaissance Squadron was assigned directly to the 117th Tactical Reconnaissance Wing.

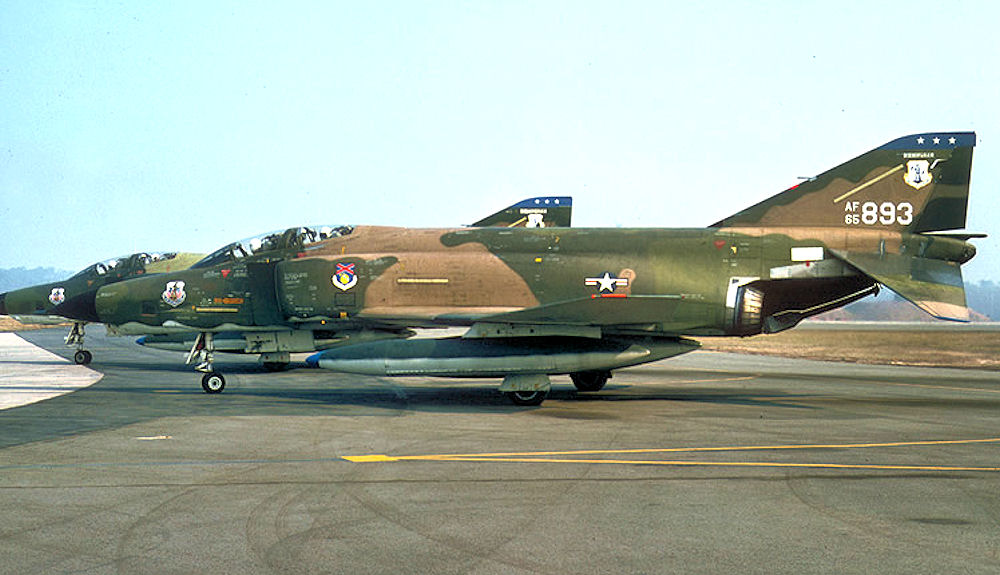
106th TRS RF-4C Phantom II aircraft at Ramstein AB, West Germany, March 1976. Aircraft were participating in "Operation Coronet Sprint". McDonnell RF-4C-26-MC Phantom 65-0893 visible in foreground.

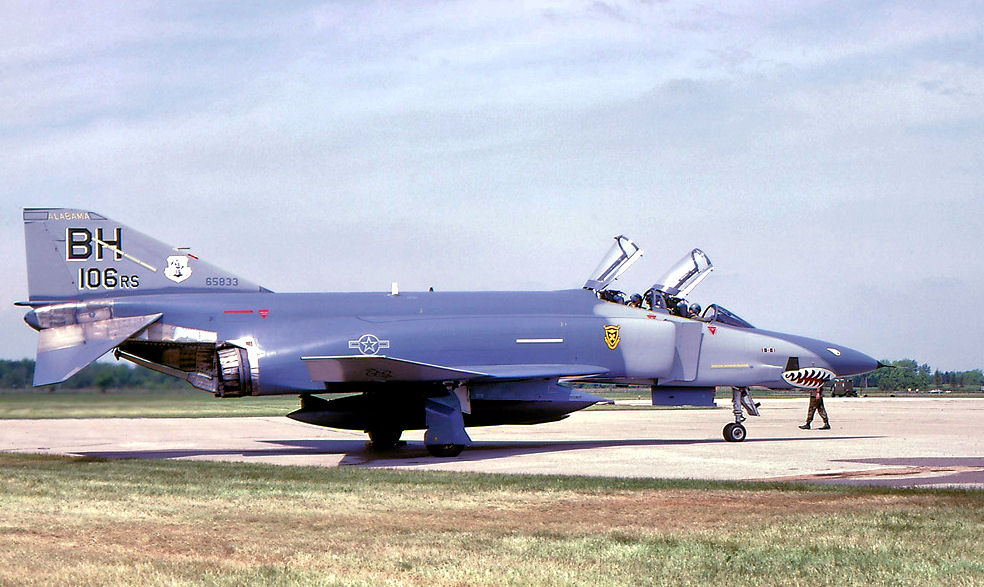
106th Reconnaissance Squadron McDonnell RF-4C-24-MC Phantom 65–0833 in late-1980s camouflage motif. Aircraft retired in 1993, now on static display at Jasper, AL VFW post.

Many awards were earned by the 117th; for having the best National Guard publication; for achieving flying milestones; for service to the United States Secret Service; and for outstanding accomplishments on Operational Readiness Inspections. The 117th also earned awards for having the best Air National Guard flying unit in the United States.

=== Operation Desert Shield ===
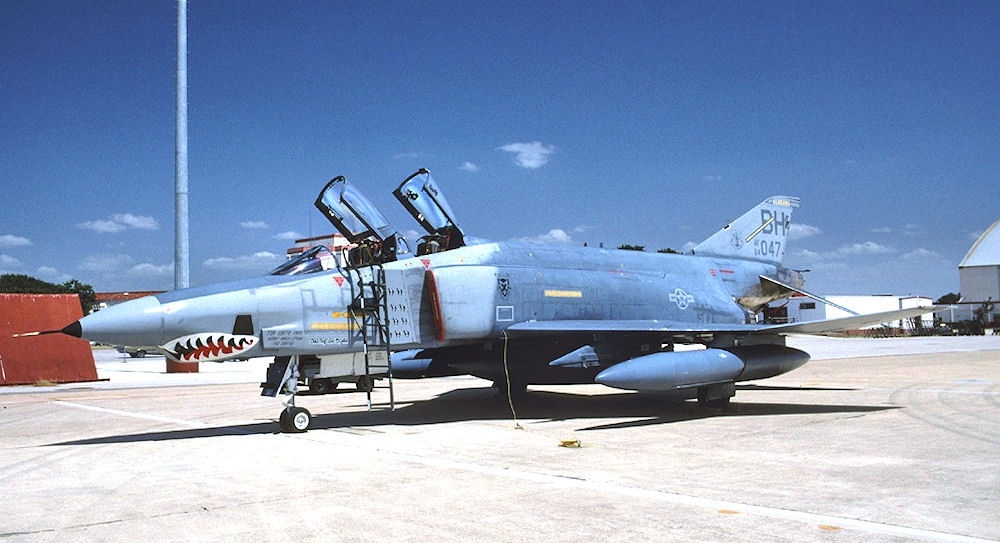
106th TRS RF-4C Phantom II 64–1047, shown at Al Dhafra Air Base, United Arab Emirates during Operation Desert Shield. Note the numerous "camels", painted on its intake, representing the number of missions flown. 1047 Flew 172 sorties in Desert Shield. After its retirement in May 1994, the aircraft was flown to Wright-Patterson AFB, Ohio where today it is on permanent display at the National Museum of the United States Air Force. It had more than 7,300 hours of flying time.

By early 1989, the operational lifetime of the F-4 Phantom was ending, and the number of RF-4C squadrons serving both on active-duty as well as in Air National Guard units was being reduced. In large part, the RF-4C was being replaced by the Lockheed U-2 TR-1A and TR-1B. The collapse of the Soviet Union and the dissolution of the Warsaw Pact led to accelerated retirement plans, and the retirement of the last of the RF-4Cs was in the planning stages when Iraq invaded Kuwait in August 1990, and further inactivation plans were put on hold. Consequently, the RF-4C was still in service with the USAF at the time of Operation Desert Shield.

When the United States military build-up in the Middle East began following Saddam Hussein's 2 August 1990 invasion of Kuwait, six wing RF-4Cs equipped with a camera upgrade called the HIAC-1 LOROP (Long Range Oblique Photography) deployed on 24 August 1990 to Al Dhafra Air Base, United Arab Emirates. Their journey to the war zone may have been the longest nonstop flight made by operational warplanes at that time, requiring 16 air-to-air refuelings and spanning 8,000 nautical miles in 15.5 hours. Initially assigned to HQ United States Central Command Air Forces, the wing's 106th Squadron was later attached to the 35th Tactical Fighter Wing (Provisional).

LOROP was capable of high-resolution images of objects 100 miles away using a high-resolution 66-inch focal length camera that was carried in a centerline pod underneath the aircraft. It was used to conduct prewar surveillance and photo-reconnaissance mapping of Iraqi forces in occupied Kuwait as well as those deployed along the Saudi Arabia-Iraq border. In support of RF-4C operations, numerous airmen and aircraft were used, among them C-21 Learjets, to move finished imagery around the theater. In the Combined Air Operations Center (CAOC) in Riyadh, Saudi Arabia known as the "Black Hole," coalition air commander Lt. Gen. (later Gen.) Charles "Chuck" Horner scrutinized the RF-4C images of Iraq's forces every day.

The wing lost aircraft 64-1044 crewed by Major Barry K. Henderson and Lt. Col. Stephen G. Schraam in an operational accident on 8 October 1990. The 106th, however, did not engage in combat operations during Operation Desert Storm, being relieved on 18 December 1990 by the 192d Tactical Reconnaissance Squadron of the Nevada Air National Guard.

=== Air refueling ===
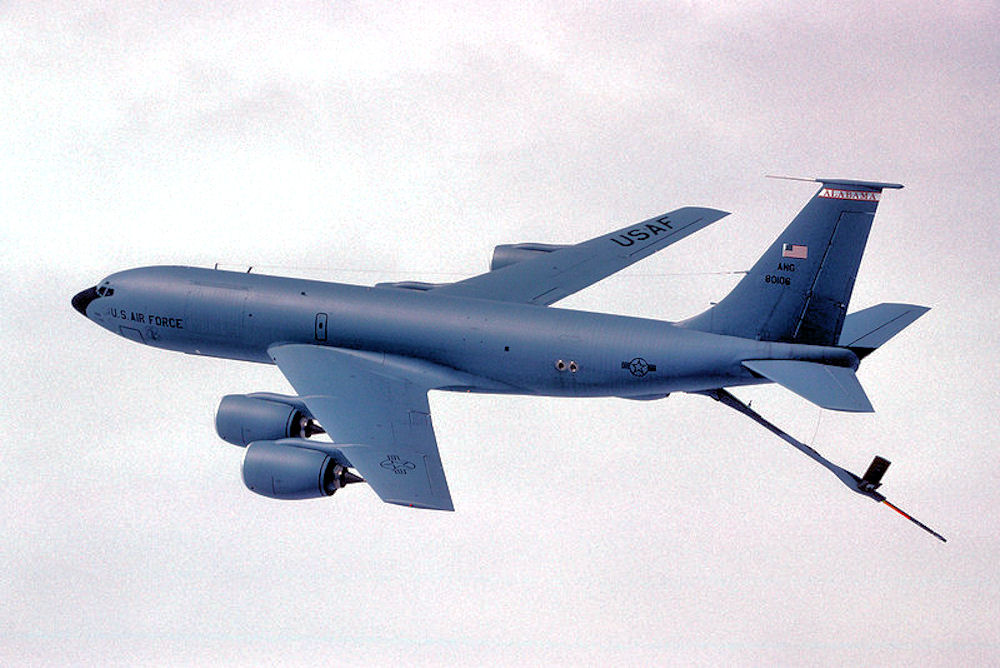
106th Air Refueling Squadron KC-135 Stratotanker

After the end of Desert Storm, the phaseout of the RF-4C was accelerated. On 16 March 1992, the wing was redesignated the 117th Reconnaissance Wing. On 1 June 1992, Tactical Air Command, which had been the gaining command for the wing since 1952, was inactivated. Air Combat Command was activated and became the wing's active duty gaining command. During 1994, the RF-4Cs were sent to Davis-Monthan Air Force Base, Arizona for retirement at the Aerospace Maintenance and Regeneration Center. On 1 October, the wing was redesignated the 117th Air Refueling Wing, its mission now becoming air refueling with Boeing KC-135 Stratotankers, the first tanker arriving later that month.

After the 9/11 attacks on the United States, the 117th deployed to MacDill Air Force Base, Florida and began refueling F-15 and F-16 aircraft flying combat air patrol missions over major cities in the Southeastern United States as part of Operation Noble Eagle.

In its 2005 Base Realignment and Closure Commission recommendations, the Department of Defense recommended closing the wing and reassigning its aircraft to other National Guard units. This decision was ultimately reversed.

== Lineage ==
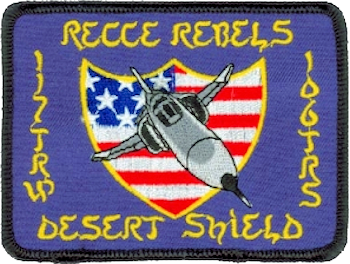
1990 Desert Shield patch

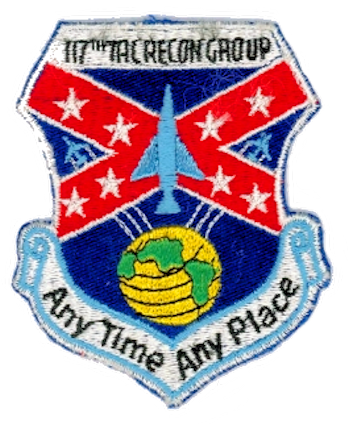
19970s RF-4C era unit emblem

- Established as the 117th Tactical Reconnaissance Wing
- Activated on 30 November 1950

Inactivated and allotted to the Air National Guard on 10 July 1952

- Activated on 10 July 1952
- Federalized and ordered to active service on 1 October 1961
- Relieved from active duty and returned to Alabama state control on 22 July 1962
- Redesignated 117th Reconnaissance Wing on 15 March 1992
- Redesignated 117th Air Refueling Wing on 16 October 1994

=== Assignments ===
- Ninth Air Force, 30 November 1950
- Twelfth Air Force, February 1951
- Alabama Air National Guard, 10 July 1952
- Ninth Air Force, 1 October 1961
- Alabama Air National Guard, 31 August 1962 – present

=== Gaining commands ===
- Tactical Air Command, 10 Jul 1952
- Air Combat Command, 1 June 1992
- Air Mobility Command, 16 October 1994

=== Operational components ===
- 117th Tactical Reconnaissance Group (later 117th Operations Group): 30 November 1950 – 10 July 1952, 10 July 1952 – 1 December 1959, 22 August 1962 – 9 December 1975, 1 January 1993 – present
- 106th Tactical Reconnaissance Squadron (later 106th Reconnaissance Squadron): 1 December 1959 – 22 August 1962, 9 January 1974 – 1 January 1993

=== Stations ===
- Lawson Air Force Base, Georgia, 30 November 1950 – 27 January 1952
- Toul-Rosières Air Base, France, 27 January – 10 July 1952
- Birmingham Municipal Airport, Alabama, 10 July 1952
- Dreux-Louvilliers AB, France, 1 October 1961
- Birmingham Municipal Airport (later Sumpter Smith Air National Guard Base), Alabama, 31 August 1962

=== Aircraft ===
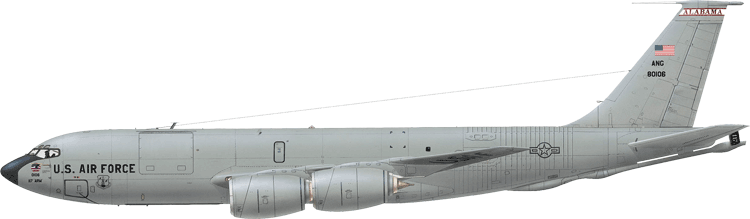
117th Air Refueling Wing KC-135 Stratotanker

- B-26C Invader, 1947-1951
- RB-26C Invader, 1951-1957
- RF-80C Shooting Star, 1951-1952
- RF-84F Thunderstreak, 1957-1971
- McDonnell Douglas RF-4C Phantom II, 1971-1993
- Boeing KC-135R Stratotanker, 1994–present
