= 117th Operations Group =

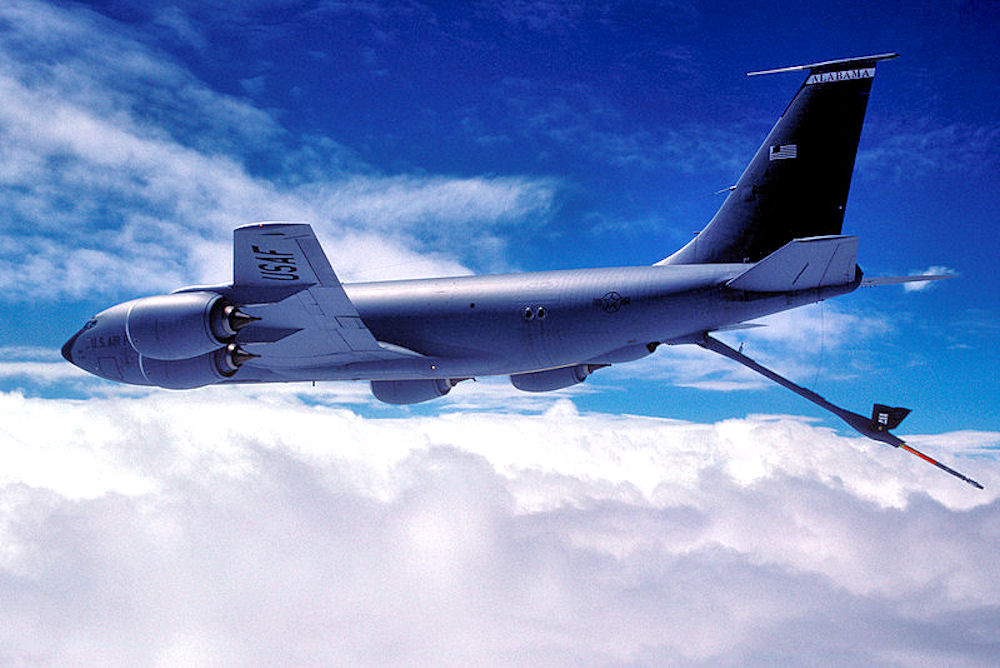
- group KC-135 Stratotanker with refueling boom extended
- Active: 1946–1952; 1952–1959; 1962–1974; 1992–present
- Country: United States
- Allegiance: Alabama
- Branch: Air National Guard
- Role: Air refueling
- Part of: Alabama Air National Guard
- Garrison/HQ: Sumpter Smith Air National Guard Base, Alabama
- Mottos: Defend and Serve; Any Time, Any Place (1960s)

Insignia
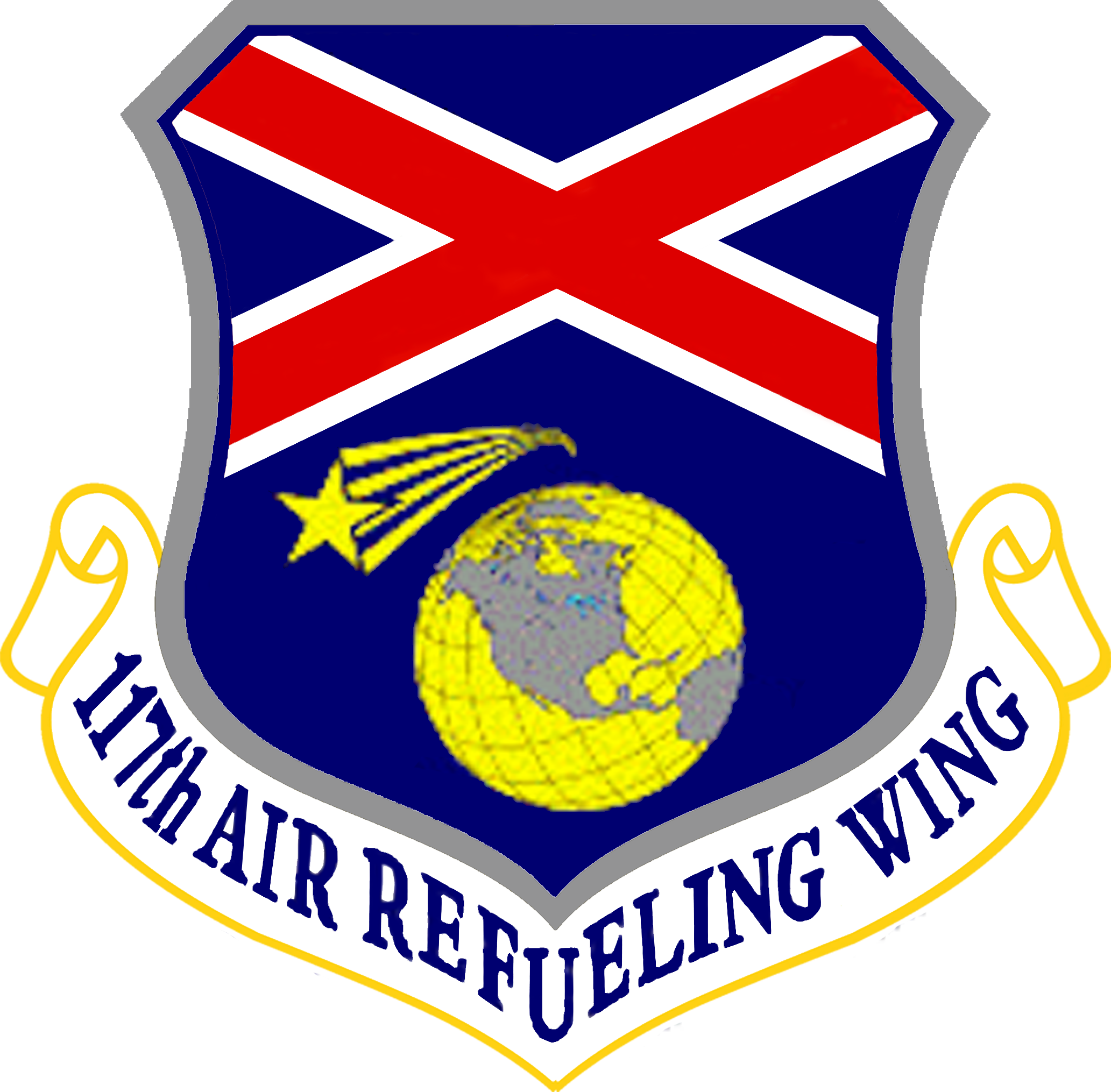
- 117th Air Refueling Wing emblem (Note: The group uses the wing emblem with the group designation on the scroll. Air Force Instruction 84-105, Organizational Lineage, Honors and Heraldry, 19 March 2013, para 3.3.3)

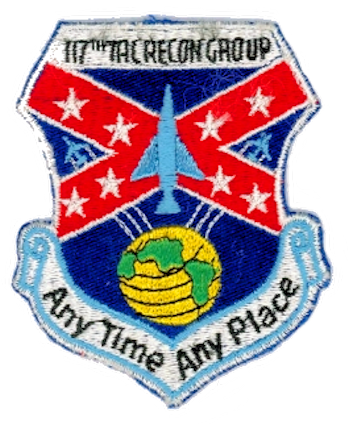
- Patch with 117th Tactical Reconnaissance Group emblem

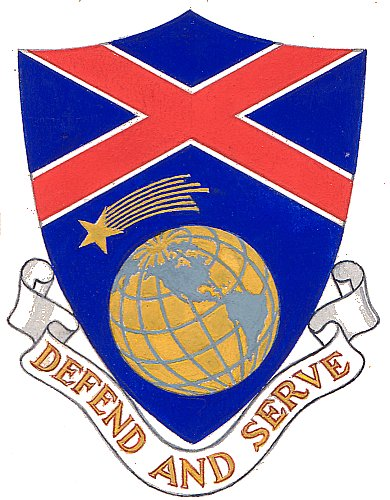
- Original 117th Tactical Reconnaissance Group emblem (approved 30 November 1953)
- Tail markings: White stripe, "Alabama" in red letters

The 117th Operations Group is a unit of the Alabama Air National Guard, stationed at Sumpter Smith Air National Guard Base, Alabama. If activated into federal service, it is gained by Air Mobility Command.

== Overview ==
The group flies the Boeing KC-135R Stratotanker. Its mission is to train and equip combat ready aircrews and support personnel to perform worldwide air refueling and airlift. Combat ready intelligence technical support is also available for worldwide assignment. The group supports state and local contingencies when directed by the Governor of Alabama.

== Units ==
The 117th Operations Group consists of the following units:

- 106th Air Refueling Squadron
- 99th Air Refueling Squadron (attached) The 99th Air Refueling Squadron is an active duty associate unit that supports and flies the group's aircraft.
- 117th Operations Support Flight

== History ==
=== Background ===
In May 1946, the Army Air Forces redesignated 27 of its combat groups and allotted them to the National Guard. One of these groups was the 354th Fighter Group, which became the 117th Fighter Group. However, in 1956, the Air Force decided to return the 354th Group to the active force. To accomplish this, the 1946 redesignation and allotment was rescinded on 26 September 1956, effective 24 March 1946. The same order constituted the 117th Fighter Group effective on 24 March 1946, severing any relation between the two units.

=== Initial activation ===
The 117th Fighter Group was extended federal recognition by the National Guard Bureau on 1 October 1947 at Birmingham Municipal Airport, Alabama. As they were organized and received federal recognition, the 153d Fighter Squadron of the Mississippi National Guard, the 157th Fighter Squadron of the South Carolina National Guard and the 160th Fighter Squadron of the Alabama National Guard were assigned. Training was initially supervised by Air Defense Command, but on 1 July 1948, Continental Air Command assumed responsibility for training Guard and Reserve units.

=== Korean War activation ===
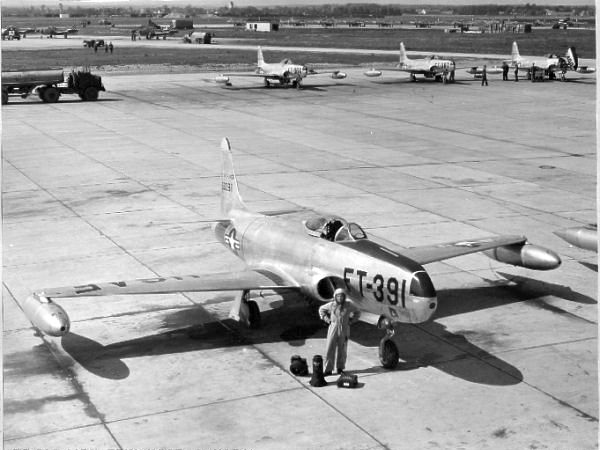
RF-80Cs of the 160th Tactical Recon Squadron (Note: Aircraft in the foreground is Lockheed RF-80C-11-LO Shooting Star serial 45-839. Photo taken at Neubiberg AB in 1952.)

The 117th was one of the first Guard units to be ordered to active service for the Korean War, entering active service on 22 October 1950. Of the group's squadrons, only the 157th and 160th remained assigned to the group when activated. The group moved to Lawson Air Force Base, Georgia, where it was converted to a reconnaissance unit, becoming the 117th Tactical Reconnaissance Group, adding another federalized squadron, the 112th Tactical Reconnaissance Squadron. At Lawson, the group trained for overseas deployment.

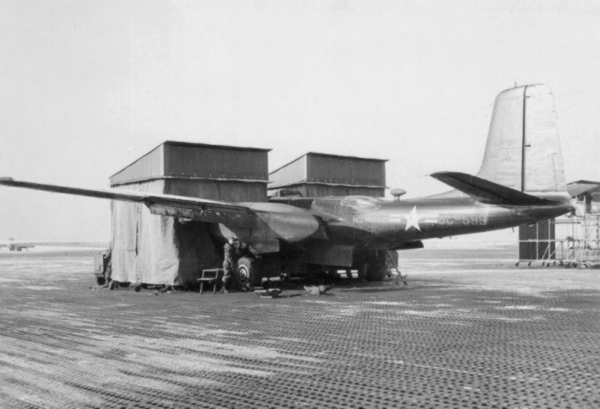
Group Douglas RB-26C (Note: Aircraft is Douglas A/RB-26C-40-DT Invader serial 44-35599 in a temporary wooden nose "hangar", January 1953. Notice the temporary Pierced Steel Planking used for the parking apron with the snow and ice. This aircraft was sold to France in September 1956. It was eventually withdrawn from use in May 1967 and scrapped.)

The group's organization differed from that of regular Air Force units, which had operated under the Wing Base Organization system since 1948. On 30 November 1950, the Air Force activated the 117th Tactical Reconnaissance Wing and support units and the group was assigned to the new wing.

At Lawson, the 157th and 160th squadrons converted to Lockheed RF-80 Shooting Star daylight photo-reconnaissance jet aircraft, while the 112th, which had been a light bomber unit, retained its Douglas RB-26C Invaders, becoming a night reconnaissance unit. The original plan was to deploy the 117th to France and reinforce the United States Air Forces in Europe at a new base, Toul-Rosières Air Base. However Toul Air Base was still under construction, and delays forced the 117th to temporarily move to Neubiberg Air Base, Germany, along with its 160th Squadron, while the 112th was transferred to Wiesbaden Air Base and the 157th was located at Fürstenfeldbruck Air Base. Headquarters and support organizations were located at Toul. The group and 112th Squadron finally moved to Toul, but the two F-80 squadrons remained in Germany while federalized.

On 10 July 1952 the 117th was released from active duty and inactivated. The 10th Tactical Reconnaissance Group was activated in its place and the mission, personnel and equipment of the 117th were transferred to the 10th.

=== Return to Alabama Air National Guard and inactivation ===
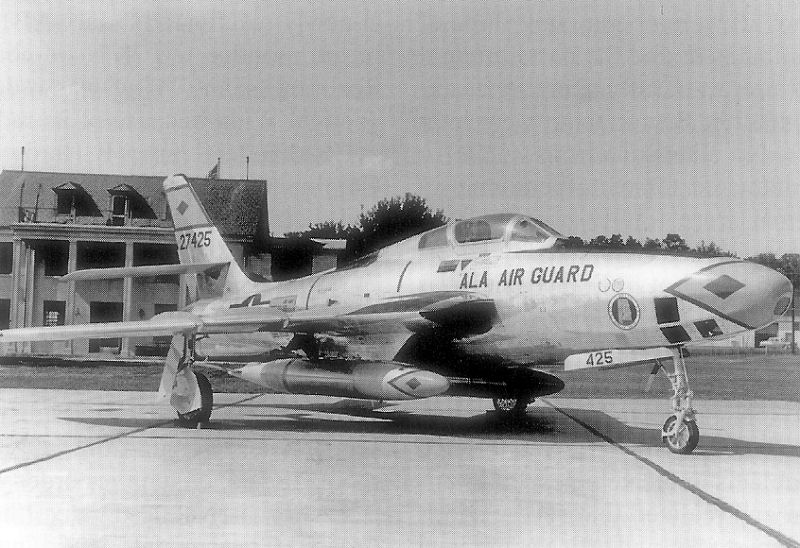
106th Squadron RF-84F Thunderflash (Note: Aircraft is Republic RF-84F-30-RE Thunderflash serial 52-7425.)

The group was again activated at Birmingham Airport, remaining the 117th Tactical Reconnaissance Group in state service. Two of its squadrons, the 106th Tactical Reconnaissance Squadron, located with the group at Birmingham and the 160th at Dannelly Field, were Alabama Air National Guard units, while the 183d Tactical Reconnaissance Squadron was located at Hawkins Field, Mississippi. The group continued to fly the RB-26C until May 1957 when new Republic RF-84F Thunderflash jet reconnaissance aircraft replaced them. The group continued to train in tactical reconnaissance missions throughout the 1950s with the Thunderflashes until inactivated in 1959.

The 117th Wing had been mobilized during the Berlin Crisis of 1961. This mobilization demonstrated that although mobilizing a wing with dispersed flying units was not a problem when the entire wing was called to active service, mobilizing individual flying squadron and elements to support it proved difficult. To resolve this, the Air Force determined to reorganize its National Guard wings by establishing groups with support elements for each of its squadrons to facilitate mobilization of elements of wings in various combinations when needed. Shortly after the 117th Wing returned to Alabama in July, the group was again activated as this plan was implemented. The 184th Tactical Reconnaissance Squadron, of the Arkansas Air National Guard was briefly assigned to the group while this reorganization was being implemented. The group remained active until December 1974, when the Air Force inactivated groups located on the same station as the wing to which they were assigned.

=== Reactivation ===
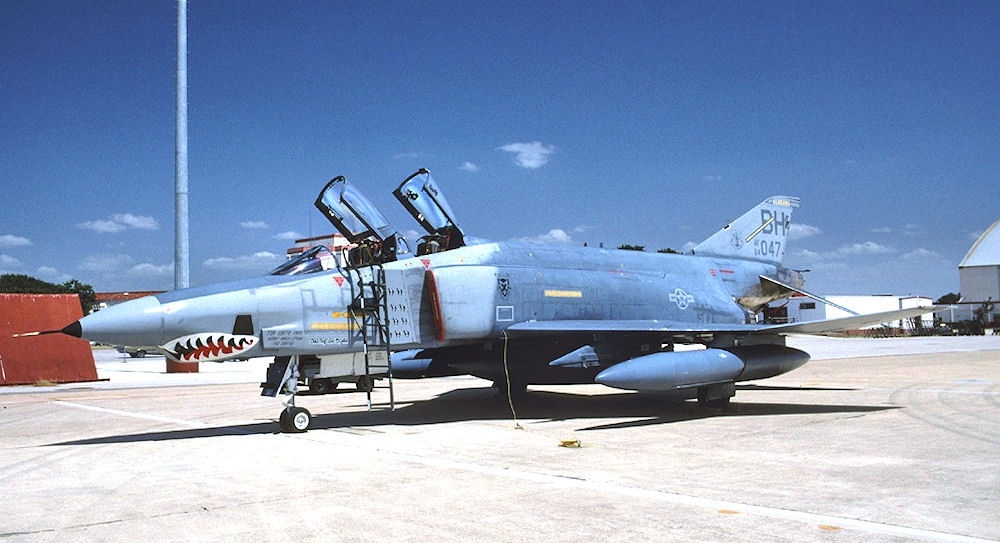
106th Squadron RF-4C Phantom II (Note: Aircraft is McDonnell RF-4C Phantom II serial 64-1047. Taken at Shaikh Isa Air Base, Bahrain during Operation Desert Shield. The camels painted on its intake represent the missions flown. 1047 Flew 172 sorties in Desert Shield. After its retirement in May 1994, the aircraft was flown to Wright-Patterson AFB, Ohio where today it is on permanent display at the National Museum of the United States Air Force. It had more than 7,300 hours of flying time.)

In 1993, the Air National Guard reorganized under the Air Force's Objective wing concept, which reintroduced groups under operational wings. The group, redesignated the 117th Operations Group, was again activated as an element of the 117th Reconnaissance Wing. After the end of Desert Storm, the phaseout of the McDonnell RF-4C Phantom II, flown by the 117th was accelerated. During 1994, the group's RF-4Cs were sent to Davis-Monthan Air Force Base, Arizona for retirement. On 1 October, the wing was redesignated the 117th Air Refueling Wing and began to fly Boeing KC-135 Stratotankers, the first tanker arriving later that month.

After the 9/11 attacks on the United States, the group deployed to MacDill Air Force Base, Florida and began refueling McDonnell Douglas F-15 Eagle and General Dynamics F-16 Fighting Falcon aircraft flying combat air patrol missions over major cities in the Southeastern United States as part of Operation Noble Eagle. In 2009, the 99th Air Refueling Squadron, a regular unit assigned to the 6th Operations Group was activated. Its members operate and maintain the group's aircraft alongside the Guardsmen assigned to the 106th Air Refueling Squadron.

== Lineage ==
- Established as the 117th Fighter Group on 24 May 1946 and allotted to the National Guard (Note: Order issued on 26 September 1956)
- Organized on 1 December 1946

Extended federal recognition on 1 October 1947
Federalized and ordered to active service on 22 October 1950
Redesignated 117th Tactical Reconnaissance Group on 27 October 1950
Inactivated and returned to Alabama State Control on 10 July 1952

- Activated on 10 July 1952

Inactivated on 1 December 1959

- Activated on 22 August 1962

Inactivated on 9 December 1974

- Redesignated 117th Operations Group

Activated on 1 January 1993

=== Assignments ===
- 54th Fighter Wing, 1 December 1946
- Tactical Air Command, 22 October 1950
- 117th Tactical Reconnaissance Wing, 30 November 1950 – 10 July 1952
- 117th Tactical Reconnaissance Wing, 10 July 1952 – 1 December 1959
- 117th Tactical Reconnaissance Wing, 22 August 1962 – 9 December 1974
- 117th Reconnaissance Wing (later 117th Air Refueling Wing), 1 January 1993 – present

=== Components ===
- 99th Air Refueling Squadron: attached 1 October 2009 – present
- 106th Tactical Reconnaissance Squadron (later 106th Reconnaissance Squadron, 106th Air Refueling Squadron): 1 January 1953 – 1 December 1959, 22 August 1962 – 9 December 1974, 1 January 1993 – present
- 112th Tactical Reconnaissance Squadron, 27 October 1950 – 10 July 1952
- 153d Fighter Squadron, 1 December 1946 – 27 October 1950, 1 December 1952 – 1 December 1959
- 157th Fighter Squadron (later 157th Tactical Reconnaissance Squadron), 1948 – 10 July 1952
- 160th Fighter Squadron (later 160th Tactical Reconnaissance Squadron), 1 September 1947 – 10 July 1952, 10 July 1952 – 1 December 1959, 22 August 1962 – 15 October 1962
- 183d Tactical Reconnaissance Squadron, 1953 – c. 15 November 1957
- 184th Tactical Reconnaissance Squadron, 22 August 1962 – 15 October 1962
- 117th Operations Support Flight: 1 October 1993 – present

=== Stations ===
- Birmingham Municipal Airport, Alabama, 1 December 1957
- Lawson Air Force Base, Georgia, 22 October 1950 – February 1951
- Neubiberg Air Base, Germany, February 1951
- Wiesbaden Air Base, Germany, 2 June 1951
- Toul-Rosières Air Base, France, 27 January – 10 July 1952
- Birmingham Municipal Airport, Alabama, 10 July 1952 – 1 December 1959
- Birmingham Municipal Airport (later Sumpter Smith Air National Guard Base), Alabama, 22 August 1962 – 9 December 1974
- Sumpter Smith Air National Guard Base, Alabama, 1 January 1993 – present

=== Aircraft ===
- North American P-51 Mustang, 1947-1951
- Douglas RB-26C Invader, 1951-1957
- Lockheed RF-80 Shooting Star, 1951-1952
- Republic RF-84F Thunderflash, 1957-1959, 1962–1971
- McDonnell RF-4C Phantom II, 1971-1974, 1993-1994
- Boeing KC-135R Stratotanker, 1994–present

== See also ==
- List of United States Air National Guard Groups & Wings
- List of A-26 Invader operators
- List of F-4 Phantom II operators
