= Sumpter Smith Air National Guard Base =

Military base in Birmingham, Alabama, US

Sumpter Smith Joint National Guard Base
- Near Birmingham, Alabama in United States of America
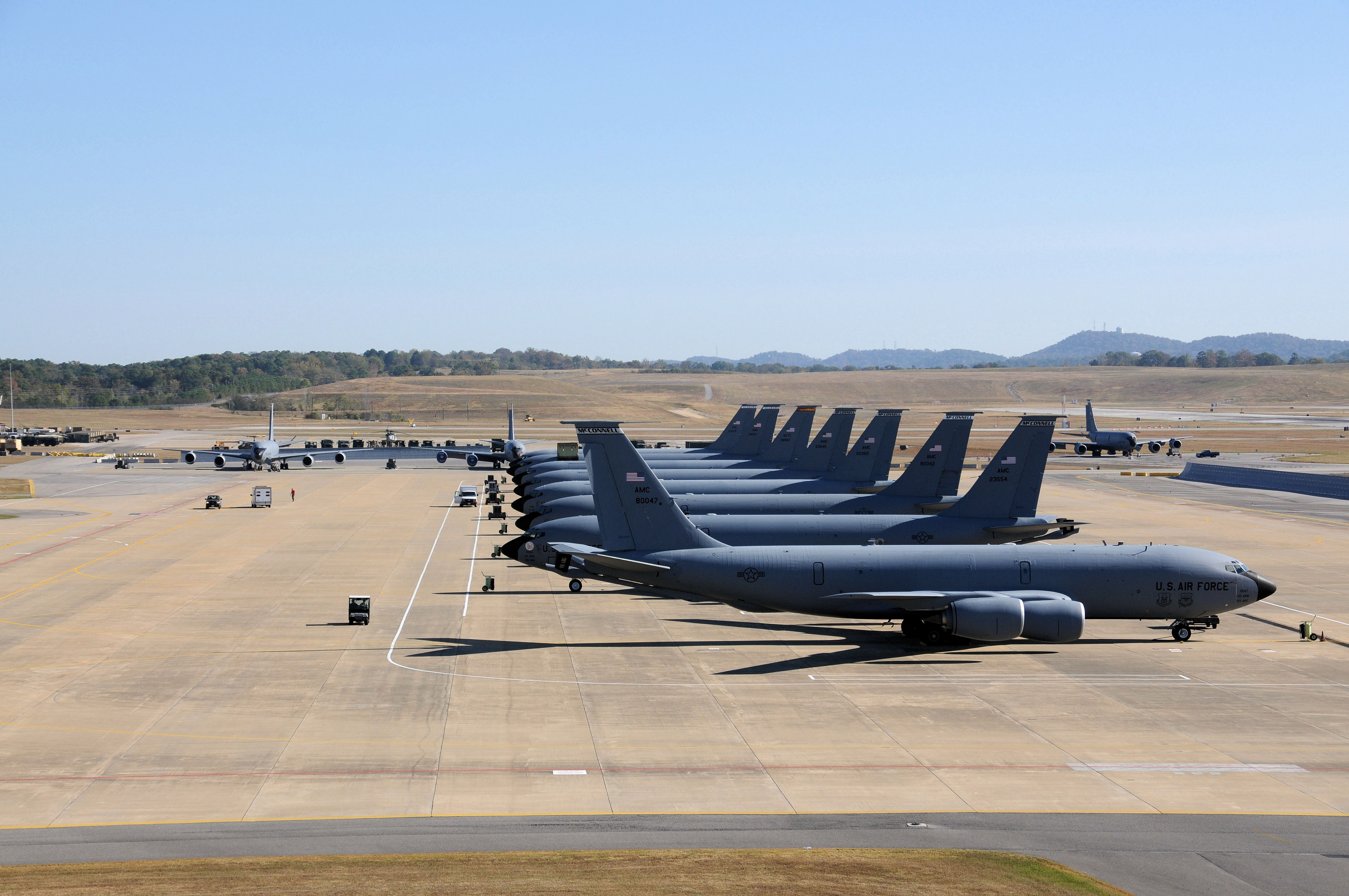
- Several KC-135R Stratotankers of the 117th Air Refueling Wing parked on the flight line at Sumpter Smith Joint National Guard Base.

Site information
- Type: Air National Guard Base
- Owner: Department of Defense
- Operator: US Air Force (USAF)
- Controlled by: Air National Guard (ANG)
- Condition: Operational
- Website: www.117arw.ang.af.mil/

Location
- Location in the United States
- Coordinates: 33°33′50″N 086°45′08″W

Site history
- Built: 1934–1938
- In use: 1938 – present

Garrison information
- Current commander: Colonel Michael Adams
- Garrison: 117th Air Refueling Wing

Airfield information
- Identifiers: IATA: BHM, ICAO: KBHM, FAA LID: BHM, WMO: 722280
- Elevation: 198.1 metres (650 ft) AMSL
Runways
Direction	Length and surface
6/24	3,659.7 metres (12,007 ft) Asphalt
18/36	2,163.7 metres (7,099 ft) Asphalt
- Airfield shared with Birmingham–Shuttlesworth International Airport; Source: Federal Aviation Administration

Sumpter Smith Joint National Guard Base (IATA: BHM, ICAO: KBHM, FAA LID: BHM) is a United States Air Force (USAF) installation located at a Birmingham, Alabama in the United States. It hosts the 117th Air Refueling Wing, part of the Air National Guard, which operates the KC-135R Stratotanker. The base was previously known as Alabama Air National Guard Base.

== History ==
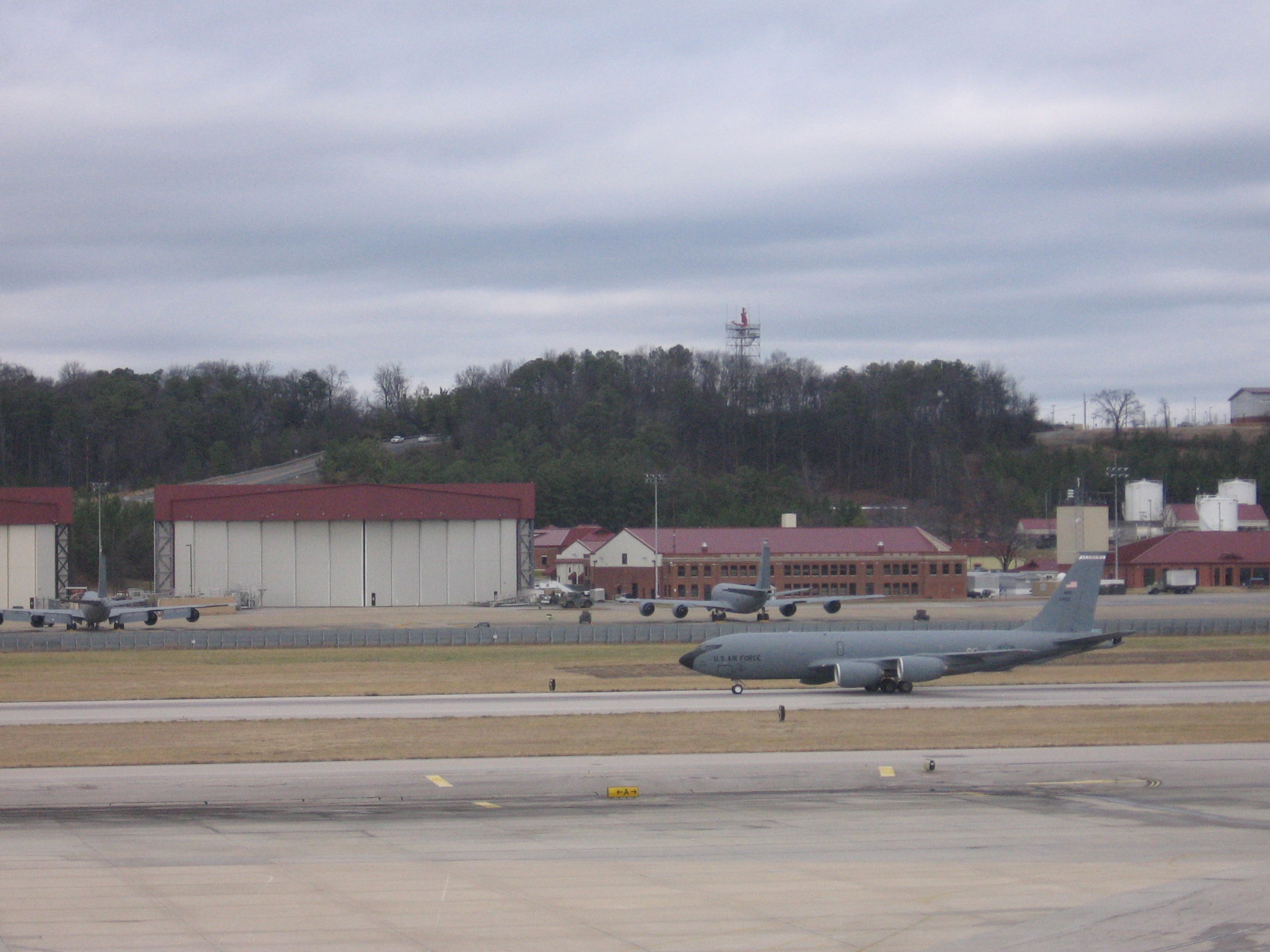
A KC-135R Stratotanker departing with the Alabama Air National Guard hangars and buildings behind.

The base is named after United States Army Air Forces Colonel Walter Sumpter Smith who was born on 12 February 1896 in Belle Ellen, Alabama and became an electrical engineer and a pilot. In 1921, Smith was appointed to the 106th Observation Squadron of the Alabama National Guard and commissioned as a first lieutenant at Roberts Field in Birmingham, Alabama. He reached the rank of lieutenant colonel on 12 August 1932 and colonel in 1942.

In 1934, the facilities at Roberts Field became less adequate and the local government decided to build a new facility which became Birmingham Municipal Airport. In 1938, after four years of construction, the 106th Observation Squadron moved to the new base.

As a testimony to Smith’s role in the development and construction, the base was eventually named Sumpter Smith Joint National Guard Base. It remained that way until sometime during the early 1990s when the name evolved to the Alabama Air National Guard Base, Birmingham, Alabama. It’s not really clear why the name changed and no official documents have been found. A push was made to restore the name of the base to Sumpter Smith Air National Guard Base and was made official during the summer of 2017.

== Based units ==
Flying and notable non-flying units based at Sumpter Smith Joint National Guard Base.

Units marked GSU are Geographically Separate Units, which although based at Sumpter Smith, are subordinate to a parent unit based at another location.

=== United States Air Force ===
Air National Guard

- Alabama Air National Guard
  - 117th Air Refueling Wing (Host Wing)
    - 117th Operations Group
      - 106th Air Refueling Squadron – KC-135R Stratotanker
    - 117th Maintenance Group
    - 117th Medical Group
    - 117th Mission Support Group

Air Mobility Command

- Eighteenth Air Force
  - 6th Air Refueling Wing
    - 6th Operations Group
      - 99th Air Refueling Squadron (GSU) – KC-135R Stratotanker

== See also ==
- List of United States Air Force installations
