= 99th Air Refueling Squadron =

US Air Force unit

99th Air Refueling Squadron

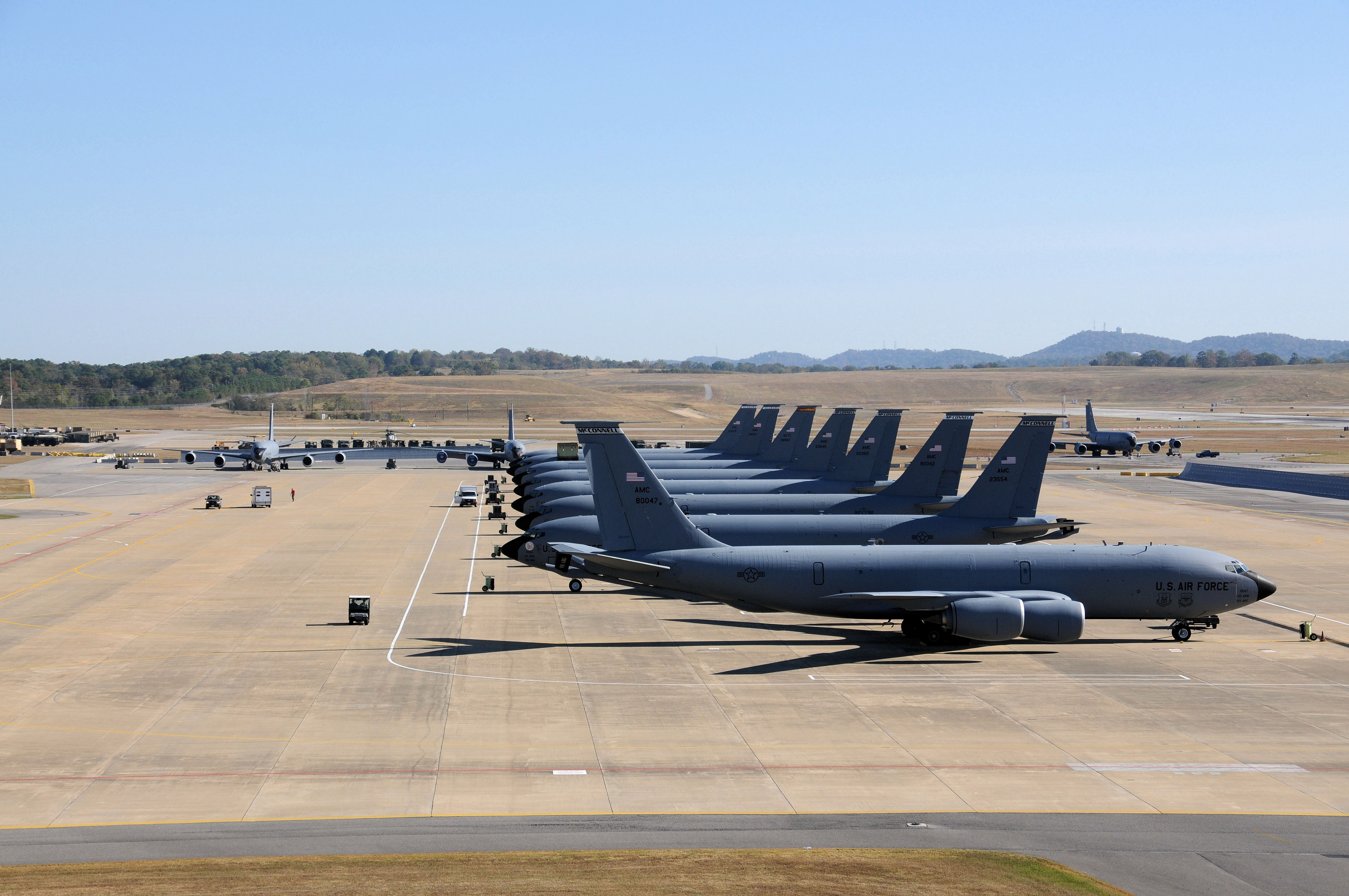
- 117th Air Refueling Wing KC-135s on the Sumpter Smith ANGB flightline
- Active: 1942–1944; 1957–1973; 1983–2008; 2009–present
- Country: United States
- Branch: United States Air Force
- Role: Aerial refueling
- Part of: Air Mobility Command
- Garrison/HQ: Sumpter Smith Air National Guard Base, Alabama
- Nickname: Black Knights
- Engagements: Kosovo Southwest Asia
- Decorations: Air Force Outstanding Unit Award with Combat "V" Device; Meritorious Unit Award; Air Force Outstanding Unit Award; Republic of Vietnam Gallantry Cross with Palm

Insignia
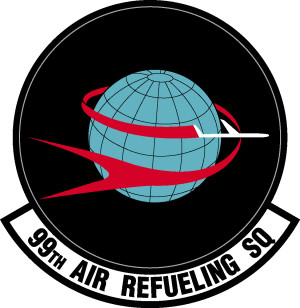
- 99th Air Refueling Squadron emblem (Note: Approved 15 May 1959. Description: On a disc black, a light blue globe, grid lines Black, over all a White stylized aircraft leaving a trail of Red exhaust encircling the globe and terminating in a split trail.) (restored)

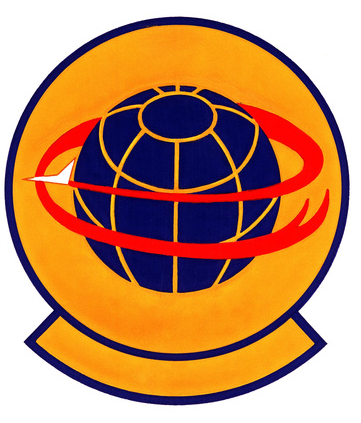
- 99th Air Refueling Squadron emblem (Note: Approved March 1984.)

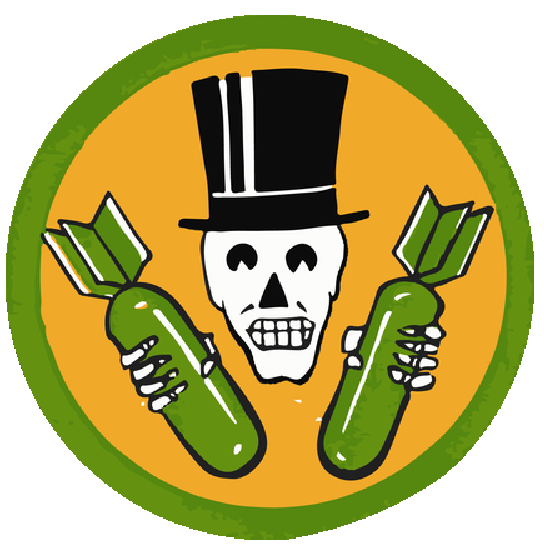
- 399th Bombardment Squadron emblem (Note: Approved 25 February 1943. Description: On an orange disc, border green, a skull wearing a black top hat proper, between two green aerial bombs held in skeleton hands.)

The 99th Air Refueling Squadron is part of the 6th Air Mobility Wing at MacDill Air Force Base, Florida, but is stationed at Sumpter Smith Air National Guard Base, Alabama. It is an Active Associate Unit, an active duty component attached to the Alabama Air National Guard's 117th Air Refueling Wing. It works with, supports and flies the 117th Air Refueling Wing's Boeing KC-135R Stratotanker aircraft.

The first predecessor of the squadron was organized during World War II as the 9th Reconnaissance Squadron. Redesignated the 399th Bombardment Squadron, it served as a crew training unit until inactivated in May 1944 in a general reorganization of Army Air Forces training units.

The 99th Air Refueling Squadron was activated in July 1957 and served with Strategic Air Command (SAC) until 1973, and again after 1983. In 1985, it was consolidated with the 399th Bombardment Squadron. When SAC was inactivated in 1992, the squadron became an element of Air Mobility Command. The squadron was inactivated in 2008, but was reactivated as an associated unit the following year.

== Mission ==
The squadron supports Air Mobility Command (AMC) priorities through deployments in support of wartime operations and participation in joint and interservice exercises. It operates closely with the 117th Air Refueling Wing as part of the Air Force’s total force integration initiative, which aims to improve mission accomplishment through the sharing of aircrews, aircraft and other resources.

== History ==
=== World War II ===
The earliest predecessor of the squadron was constituted in January 1942 as the 9th Reconnaissance Squadron. However, the squadron was redesignated the 399th Bombardment Squadron before activating on paper at Salt Lake City Army Air Base, Utah as one of the original four squadrons of the 88th Bombardment Group.

B-17 Flying Fortress of a training unit in 1943

In September the squadron moved to Geiger Field, Washington, then to Walla Walla Army Air Base, Washington, where it received its first personnel and Boeing B-17 Flying Fortresses. In October, it moved to Rapid City Army Air Base, South Dakota, where it became a heavy bomber Operational Training Unit (OTU). The OTU program involved the use of an oversized parent unit to provide cadres to "satellite" units.

The squadron's time as an OTU was brief and in November, it returned to Walla Walla. Training “fillers” for existing units was becoming more important than unit training, and the unit became a Replacement Training Unit (RTU). Like OTUs, RTUs were also oversized units, but their mission was to train individual pilots or aircrews.

As Second Air Force prepared to concentrate on organizing and training Boeing B-29 Superfortress units, heavy bomber training operations were assumed by other commands and, in November 1943, the squadron moved to Avon Park Army Air Field, Florida and became part of Third Air Force. However, the Army Air Forces found that standard military units like the 399th, based on relatively inflexible tables of organization, were not proving well adapted to the training mission. Accordingly, it adopted a more functional system in which each base was organized into a separate numbered unit, The 88th Bombardment Group, its components and its supporting units at Avon Park were disbanded or inactivated in May 1944, and replaced by the 325th AAF Base Unit (Replacement Training, Bombardment, Heavy).

=== Strategic Air Command air refueling ===
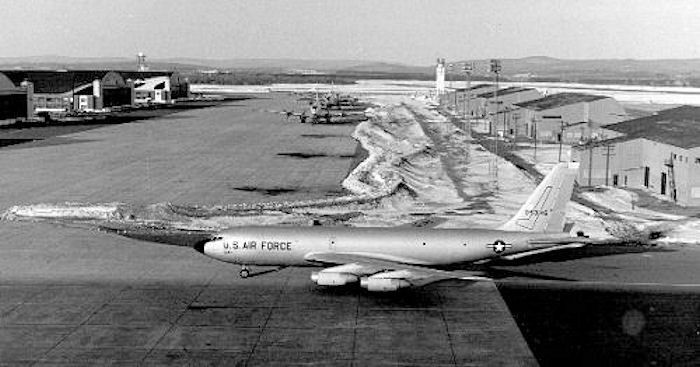
KC-135s at Westover AFB in 1969

The 99th Air Refueling Squadron was activated at Turner Air Force Base, Georgia in July 1957 as a Boeing KC-135 Stratotanker squadron under Strategic Air Command (SAC) and assigned to the 4050th Air Refueling Wing. The following month it moved to Westover Air Force Base, Massachusetts, where the wing headquarters was located. Beginning in 1958, The 99th conducted theater and overseas air refueling. In 1963, the 4050th Wing, which was a Major Command controlled wing and could not continue its history if discontinued, was replaced by the 499th Air Refueling Wing, an Air Force controlled wing, which could continue its history through periods of inactive service. In December 1965, operational control of the squadron was transferred to the 99th Bombardment Wing, which became the parent of the squadron when the 499th Wing was inactivated in January 1966.

Starting in 1965 the 99th supported operations in Southeast Asia. For its efforts, it earned the Air Force Outstanding Unit Award with Combat "V" Device and the Republic of Vietnam Gallantry Cross with Palm. During several periods after 1967, all squadron resources were transferred to units supporting the Vietnam War, although the squadron nominally remained at Westover. The squadron was inactivated in September 1973 as the 99th Wing reduced its operations in preparing Westover for transfer to the Air Force Reserve.

=== Airborne command post operations ===
In 1962, SAC established an airborne command post at Offutt Air Force Base, Nebraska, nicknamed Looking Glass, to ensure continuity of command and control of SAC forces in the event of a nuclear attack. Looking Glass was soon augmented by auxiliary aircraft stationed with the headquarters of SAC's three Numbered Air Forces. The 99th Squadron added Boeing EC-135 aircraft to its inventory in 1965 to operate the Eastern Auxiliary Command Post for Eighth Air Force at Westover. The EC-135s had turbofan engines, were equipped with advanced electronics equipment, and could be refueled by other tankers while retaining the refueling capability of the KC-135s. The 99th continued to operate EC-135s until 1 April 1970, when SAC reorganized its airborne command post aircraft and withdrew them from vulnerable bases near the coasts like Westover and assigned them to the 2d, 3d, and 4th Airborne Command and Control Squadrons, stationed at bases closer to the heartland of North America.

=== Operations at Robins Air Force Base ===
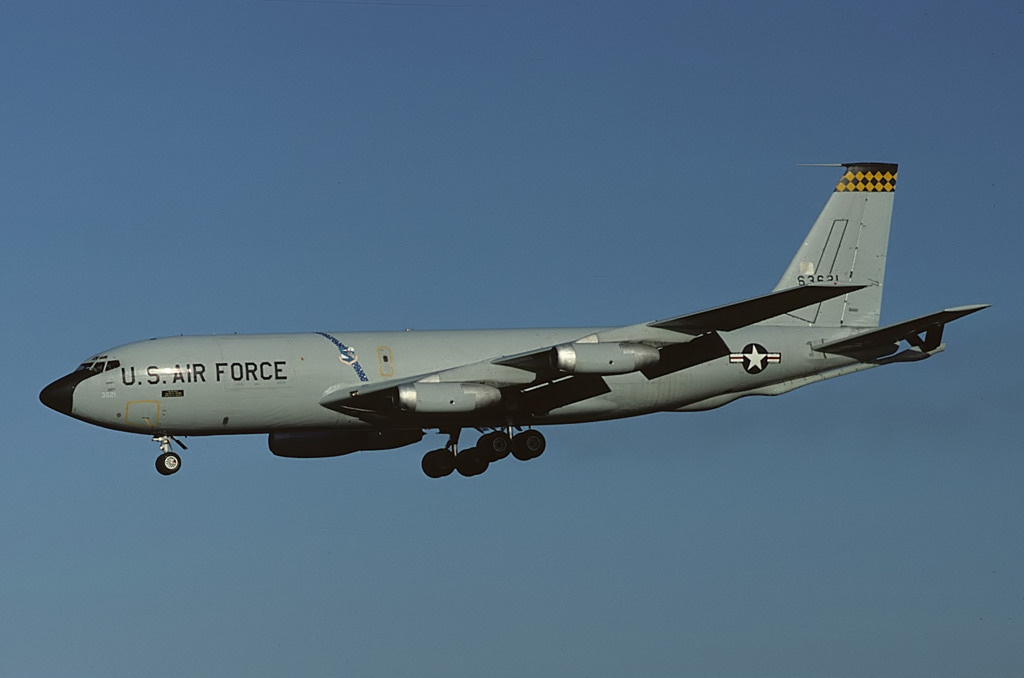
Deployed KC-135A Stratotanker from Robins AFB in 1985

In October 1983 the squadron was reactivated at Robins Air Force Base, Georgia, becoming the second refueling squadron of the 19th Air Refueling Wing when the 19th Wing converted from the strategic bombardment mission and lost its Boeing B-52 Stratofortress aircraft. It again flew worldwide aerial refueling missions. Between 1984 and 1991 it also performed the airborne command post mission.

Shortly after its activation, the 99th supported Operation Urgent Fury, which replaced the Stalinist regime in Grenada. In December 1989, 99th tankers supported Operation Just Cause, which ousted Manuel Noriega as the leader of Panama. In its last contingency operation while part of SAC, the unit deployed aircraft and crew to support Operation Desert Shield in August 1990 and continued its deployment through Operation Desert Storm, which ended the occupation of Kuwait by Iraq.

=== Air Mobility Command ===
In 1992, the Air Force reorganized its combat forces. In the reorganization, tanker aircraft, which had been assigned to SAC, were mostly reassigned to the new Air Mobility Command (AMC). Under AMC, the squadron participated in Operation Deny Flight over Bosnia, from January to February 1995 and again in August 1996. It provided personnel and aircraft to refuel aircraft participating in Operations Provide Comfort, Northern Watch and Southern Watch, enforcing no-fly zones over Iraq in 1996. Deployed squadron operations along the border of Iraq continued in the following two years in Operations Phoenix Scorpion, Desert Thunder and Desert Fox.

In 1998 and 1999 the squadron supported Operations Noble Anvil, Deliberate Forge and Allied Force over the Balkans in areas that had been part of Yugoslavia.

Closer to home, The squadron also refueled aircraft involved in Operation Constant Vigil, counter drug operations over the Caribbean Sea in 1998. These operations later expanded to locations in South America. After the terrorist attacks on New York City and the Pentagon on 11 September 2001, the squadron supported Operation Enduring Freedom in Afghanistan and Operation Iraqi Freedom in Iraq. The unit also transported Taliban and Al Qaeda detainees to the Guantanamo Bay detention camp, Cuba. In 2008, the squadron was inactivated at Robins.

=== Active associate unit ===
In October 2009, the 99th was reactivated at Sumpter Smith Air National Guard Base, Alabama as part of the Air Force's Total Force Integration initiative. The squadron and its personnel are an active duty Air Force unit assigned to the 6th Operations Group at MacDill Air Force Base, Florida. Operational direction for day-to-day taskings comes from the 117th Operations Group of the Alabama Air National Guard at Birmingham as the squadron's personnel operate the KC-135s of the 117th's 106th Air Refueling Squadron.

== Lineage ==
399th Bombardment Squadron

- Constituted as the 9th Reconnaissance Squadron (Heavy) on 28 January 1942

Redesignated 399th Bombardment Squadron (Heavy) on 22 April 1942
Activated on 15 July 1942
Inactivated on 1 May 1944

- Consolidated with the 99th Air Refueling Squadron as the 99th Air Refueling Squadron on 19 September 1985

99th Air Refueling Squadron

- Constituted as the 99th Air Refueling Squadron, Heavy on 12 February 1957

Activated on 1 July 1957
Inactivated on 30 September 1973

- Activated on 1 October 1983
- Consolidated with the 399th Bombardment Squadron on 19 September 1985

Redesignated 99th Air Refueling Squadron on 1 September 1991
Inactivated on 1 September 2008

- Activated on 1 October 2009

=== Assignments ===
- 88th Bombardment Group, 15 July 1942 – 1 May 1944
- 4050th Air Refueling Wing, 1 July 1957
- 499th Air Refueling Wing, 1 January 1963
- 99th Bombardment Wing, 1 January 1966 – 30 September 1973
- 19th Air Refueling Wing, 1 October 1983
- 19th Operations Group (later 19th Air Refueling Group), 1 September 1991 – 1 September 2008
- 6th Operations Group, 1 October 2009 – present (attached to 117th Operations Group)

=== Stations ===
- Salt Lake City Army Air Base, Utah, 15 July 1942
- Geiger Field, Washington, 1 September 1942
- Walla Walla Army Air Base, Washington, 21 September 1942
- Rapid City Army Air Base, South Dakota, 26 October 1942
- Walla Walla Army Air Base, Washington, 28 November 1942
- Redmond Army Air Field, Oregon, 1 January 1943
- Walla Walla Army Air Base, Washington, 2 February 1943
- Madras Army Air Field, Oregon, 11 June 1943
- Walla Walla Army Air Base, Washington, 21 July 1943
- Avon Park Army Air Field, Florida, c. 7 November 1943 – 1 May 1944
- Turner Air Force Base, Georgia, 1 July 1957
- Westover Air Force Base, Massachusetts, 22 August 1957 – 30 September 1973
- Robins Air Force Base, Georgia, 1 October 1983 – 1 September 2008
- Sumpter Smith Air National Guard Base, Alabama 1 October 2009 – present

=== Aircraft ===
- Boeing B-17 Flying Fortress (1942–1944)
- Boeing KC-135 Stratotanker (1957–1973, 1983–2008, 2009–present)
- Boeing EC-135 (1965–1970, 1984–1997)
- Boeing EC-137 Stratoliner (1991–1994)

=== Awards and campaigns ===
Award streamer	Award	Dates	Notes
	Air Force Meritorious Unit Award	1 July 2006–30 June 2007	99th Air Refueling Squadron
	Air Force Outstanding Unit Award with Combat "V" Device	2-21 March 1969 and 15–31 March 1970	99th Air Refueling Squadron
	Air Force Outstanding Unit Award	[1 July 1957]–1 December 1959	99th Air Refueling Squadron
	Air Force Outstanding Unit Award	1 October 1967–1 March 1968	99th Air Refueling Squadron
	Air Force Outstanding Unit Award	2 March–1 April 1968	99th Air Refueling Squadron
	Air Force Outstanding Unit Award	1 July 1971–30 June 1972	99th Air Refueling Squadron
	Air Force Outstanding Unit Award	1 October 1983–30 June 1984	99th Air Refueling Squadron
	Air Force Outstanding Unit Award	1 July 1986–30 June 1987	99th Air Refueling Squadron
	Air Force Outstanding Unit Award	1 July 1993–30 June 1994	99th Air Refueling Squadron
	Air Force Outstanding Unit Award	1 July 1994–30 June 1996	99th Air Refueling Squadron
	Air Force Outstanding Unit Award	1 July 1998–30 June 1999	99th Air Refueling Squadron
	Air Force Outstanding Unit Award	1 July 1998–30 June 1999	99th Air Refueling Squadron
	Air Force Outstanding Unit Award	24 March 1999–10 June 2000	99th Air Refueling Squadron
	Air Force Outstanding Unit Award	1 July 2002–30 June 2003	99th Air Refueling Squadron
	Air Force Outstanding Unit Award	1 July 2003–30 June 2004	99th Air Refueling Squadron
	Air Force Outstanding Unit Award	1 July 2004–30 June 2005	99th Air Refueling Squadron
	Air Force Outstanding Unit Award	1 July 2005–30 June 2006	99th Air Refueling Squadron
	Air Force Outstanding Unit Award	1 July 2006–30 June 2007	99th Air Refueling Squadron
	Air Force Outstanding Unit Award	1 July 2009–30 June 2010	99th Air Refueling Squadron
	Air Force Outstanding Unit Award	1 July 2013–30 June 2014	99th Air Refueling Squadron
	Air Force Outstanding Unit Award	1 January 2016–30 September 2017	99th Air Refueling Squadron
	Air Force Outstanding Unit Award	1 October 2017–30 September 2019	99th Air Refueling Squadron
	Air Force Outstanding Unit Award	1 October 2022–30 September 2023	99th Air Refueling Squadron
	Vietnamese Gallantry Cross with Palm	2 March 1969–31 March 1970	99th Air Refueling Squadron

Campaign Streamer	Campaign	Dates	Notes
	American Theater without inscription	15 July 1942–1 May 44	399th Bombardment Squadron
	Defense of Saudi Arabia	2 August 1990–16 January 1991	99th Air Refueling Squadron
	Liberation and Defense of Kuwait	17 January 1991–11 April 1991	99th Air Refueling Squadron
	Air Campaign	24 March 1999–10 June 1999	99th Air Refueling Squadron

== See also ==
- List of United States Air Force air refueling squadrons
- B-17 Flying Fortress units of the United States Army Air Forces
