= 112th Fighter Squadron =

112th Fighter Squadron

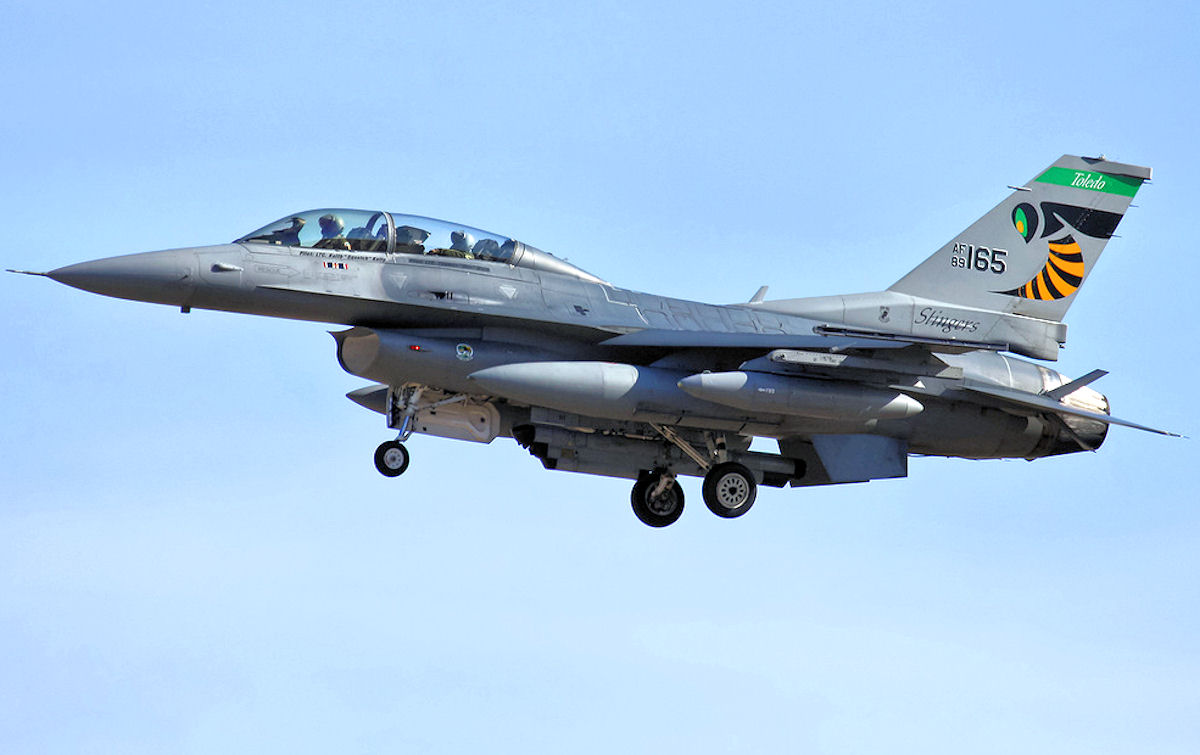
- 112th Fighter Squadron F-16D Fighting Falcon (Note: Aircraft is General Dynamics F-16D Block 42F Fighting Falcon, serial 89-2165.)
- Active: 1917–1919; 1927–1942; 1943–1945; 1946–1952; 1952–present
- Country: United States
- Allegiance: Ohio
- Branch: Air National Guard
- Type: Squadron
- Role: Fighter
- Part of: Ohio Air National Guard
- Garrison/HQ: Toledo Air National Guard Base, Ohio
- Nickname: Stingers
- Engagements: European Theater of Operations
- Decorations: Air Force Outstanding Unit Award

Insignia
- 112th Fighter Squadron emblem

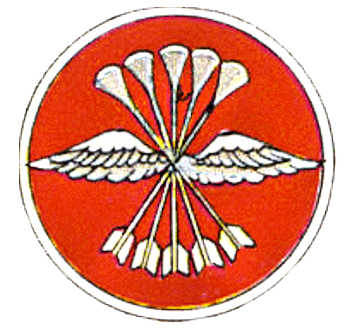
- 112th Liaison Squadron emblem

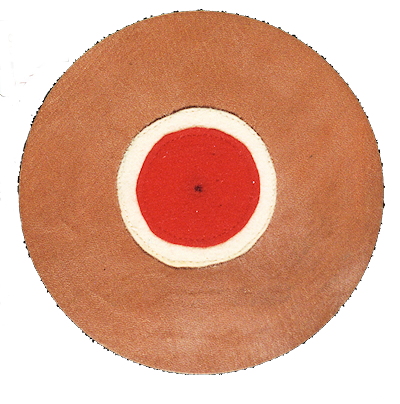
- 112th Observation Squadron emblem

- Tail stripe

The 112th Fighter Squadron is a unit of the Ohio Air National Guard 180th Fighter Wing located at Toledo Air National Guard Base, Ohio. The 112th is equipped with the F-16C/D Fighting Falcon.

The squadron is a descendant organization of the World War I, 112th Aero Squadron, established on 18 August 1917. It was reformed on 20 June 1927, as the 112th Observation Squadron, and is one of the 29 original National Guard Observation Squadrons of the United States Army National Guard formed before World War II.

== History ==
=== World War I ===
The squadron dates its origins to the organization of the 112th Aero Squadron on 18 August 1917 at Kelly Field, Texas. The squadron served as a supply squadron at Kelly Field, being redesignated the 633d Aero Supply Squadron (Supply) on 1 February 1918. It remained at Kelly Field, and was demobilized on 19 August 1919.

=== Ohio National Guard ===
Although authorized in 1921, the 112th Observation Squadron was not organized and federally recognized until 20 June 1927 at Cleveland Hopkins Airport.

The squadron, or elements thereof, called up to perform the following state duties: support to civil authorities during a mine worker's strike at Cadiz, OH, 16 April–17 August 1932; Electric Auto Lite strike at Toledo, OH, in 1934; flood relief efforts along the Ohio River in southern Ohio during January–February 1937; riot control during a labor strike at the Mahoning Valley steel plants 22 June–15 July 1937. Conducted summer training at Camp Perry, OH

The unit flew a wide range of aircraft throughout the late 1920s and 1930s including the PT-1, BT-1, the O-2 and the O-11.

=== World War II ===
On 25 November 1940 the 112th was federalized and ordered to active service as part of the buildup of the Army Air Corps after the Fall of France. The unit was ordered to Pope Field, North Carolina where it was equipped with North American O-47 observation aircraft. It performed antisubmarine patrols over the North and South Carolina coasts, with a flight operating from Myrtle Beach Airport. After the Japanese attack on Pearl Harbor, the 112th was moved to Dover Field, Delaware and equipped with O-49s and O-57s, performing coastal patrols over the Atlantic for German U-boats over Delaware Bay and the approaches to Philadelphia. In the spring of 1942, was returned to South Carolina where it continued patrolling the mid-Atlantic coastline shipping routes.

In October 1942, the unit was moved to Birmingham Army Air Field, Alabama where it was inactivated.

==== 112th Liaison Squadron ====
In April 1943, the unit was reactivated as the 112th Liaison Squadron at Salinas Army Air Base, California. The squadron was equipped with a series of light courier aircraft and for the next year was a courier unit for Fourth Air Force between airfields primarily in the Pacific Northwest. The unit was reassigned to Ninth Air Force in England in June 1944 where it operated Cessna UC-78 light transport aircraft in England and in liberated areas of France. It was assigned to Supreme Headquarters Allied Expeditionary Force, and provided VIP transportation until the end of the war, eventually serving as part of the Army of Occupation in Germany during 1945. It was inactivated in November 1945 at Drew Field, Florida.

=== Ohio Air National Guard ===
The 112th was redesignated the 112th Bombardment Squadron (Light), and was allotted to the National Guard on 24 May 1946. It was organized at Cleveland Municipal Airport, Ohio and was extended federal recognition on 2 December 1946. The 112th Bombardment Squadron was equipped with 20 R-26B/C Invader reconnaissance aircraft, a C-47, and two T-6s for training.

The Invaders practiced night reconnaissance operations. Parts were no problem and many of the maintenance personnel were World War II veterans so readiness was quite high and the planes were often much better maintained than their USAF counterparts. In some ways, the postwar Air National Guard was almost like a flying country club and a pilot could often show up at the field, check out an aircraft and go flying. However, the unit also had regular military exercises that kept up proficiency and in gunnery and bombing contests they would often score at least as well or better than active-duty USAF units, given the fact that most ANG pilots were World War II combat veterans.

==== Korean War activation ====
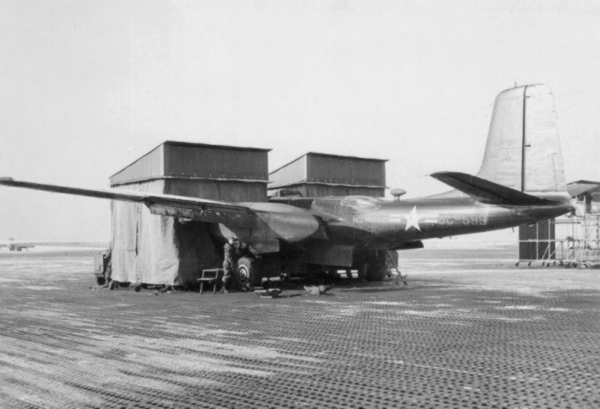
Squadron RB-26C Invader in a temporary wooden nose "hangar" (Note: Aircraft is Douglas RB-26C-40-DT Invader, serial 44-35599, January 1953. Notice the temporary pierced steel planking used for the parking apron with the snow and ice.)

The 112th Bombardment Squadron was federalized due to the Korean War on 10 October 1950. It was redesignated the 112th Tactical Reconnaissance Squadron and assigned to the federalized Alabama ANG 117th Tactical Reconnaissance Group. Moved to Lawson Air Force Base, Georgia, the 117thconsisted of the Alabama ANG 160th Tactical Reconnaissance Squadron; South Carolina ANG 157th Tactical Reconnaissance Squadron, and the 112th.

The 160th and 157th Squadrons were equipped with RF-80A Shooting Star reconnaissance jets and began training in daylight photo-reconnaissance, while the 112th continued training with its RB-26C Invaders in the night reconnaissance role. The 117th Tactical Reconnaissance Wing was assigned to Ninth Air Force, Tactical Air Command. The wing then began what was then believed to be a short transition training period. The original plan was to deploy the 117th to France and reinforce the United States Air Forces in Europe at a new base in France, Toul-Rosières Air Base. However Toul Air Base was still under construction, and delays in France for several reasons forced the 117th to remain at Lawson AFB for over a year until finally receiving deployment orders in January 1952.

The 117th arrived at Toul Air Base on 27 January 1952. However at the time of the Wing's arrival, Toul AB consisted of a sea of mud, and the new jet runway was breaking up and could not support safe flying. The commander of the 117th deemed it uninhabitable and its flying squadrons of the wing were ordered dispersed to West Germany. The 112th transferred to Wiesbaden Air Base. The non-flying headquarters and support organizations remained at Toul.

The mission of the 117 Wing was to provide tactical, visual, photographic and electronic reconnaissance by both day and night, as was required by the military forces within the European command. The RF-80's were responsible for the daylight operations; the RB-26s for night photography. In June 1952, the 117th was involved in Exercise 'June Primer'. This exercise took place in an area bordered by a line drawn from Cherbourg to Geneva in the east and in the west by this Swiss, Austrian and Russian occupation zone borders.

By July 1952 the facilities at Wiesbaden were becoming very crowded, and it was felt that the B-26's could fly from the primitive conditions at Toul. The 112th returned to Toul, however the jet-engined RF-80's remained in West Germany until a new runway was constructed.

On 9 July 1952 the squadron was released from active duty and inactivated and its mission was taken over by the newly activated 10th Tactical Reconnaissance Wing. All of the aircraft and support equipment remained at Toul and was transferred to the 10th Wing.

==== Cold War ====
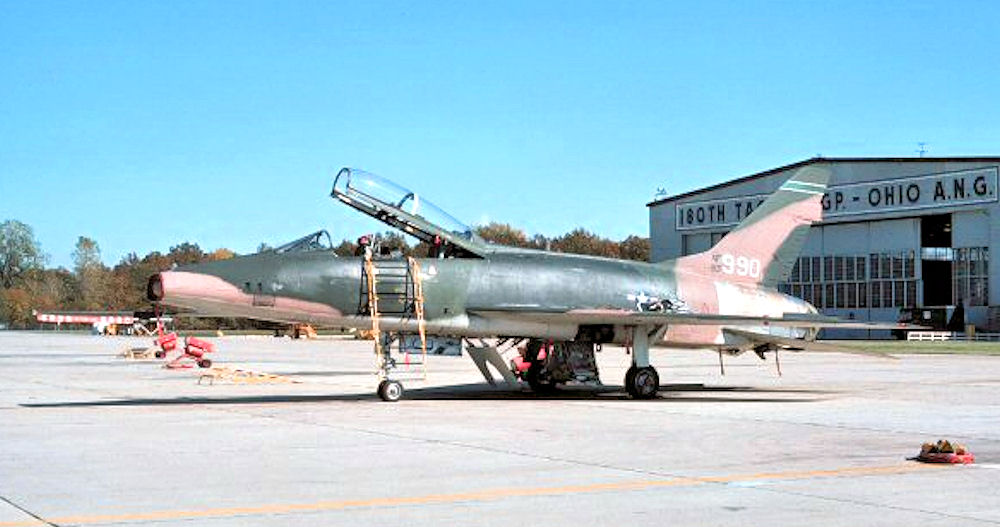
112th Tactical Fighter Squadron F-100F Super Sabre (Note: Aircraft is North American F-100F-15-NA Super Sabre, serial 56-3990 about 1975.)

With the return from France, the squadron was reformed at Akron-Canton Airport and redesignated the 112th Fighter-Bomber Squadron. It was re-equipped with F-51H Mustangs, and were one of the last two Air National Guard squadrons to fly this version of the Mustang.

In October 1955, the 112th were informed that they were to receive F-84E Thunderjets, but since the runways at Akron-Canton Municipal Airport were deemed inadequate for jet operations, it was decided to construct an entirely new facility for them at the new Toledo Express Airport. The 112th left Akron for Toledo on 1 April 1956 and retired their Mustangs for T-28A Trojans, and operated F-84Es until the summer of 1958. In January 1959, the 112th's facility at the Toledo Express Airport and moved to the new facility. The T-28s were replaced with new F-84F Thunderstreaks and the squadron was designated as a Tactical Fighter Squadron.

On 15 October 1962, the 112th was authorized to expand to a group level, and the 180th Tactical Fighter Group was established. The 112th became the group's flying squadron. Other elements assigned into the group were the 180th group headquarters, 180th Material Squadron (maintenance and supply), 180th Combat Support Squadron, and the 180th USAF Dispensary.

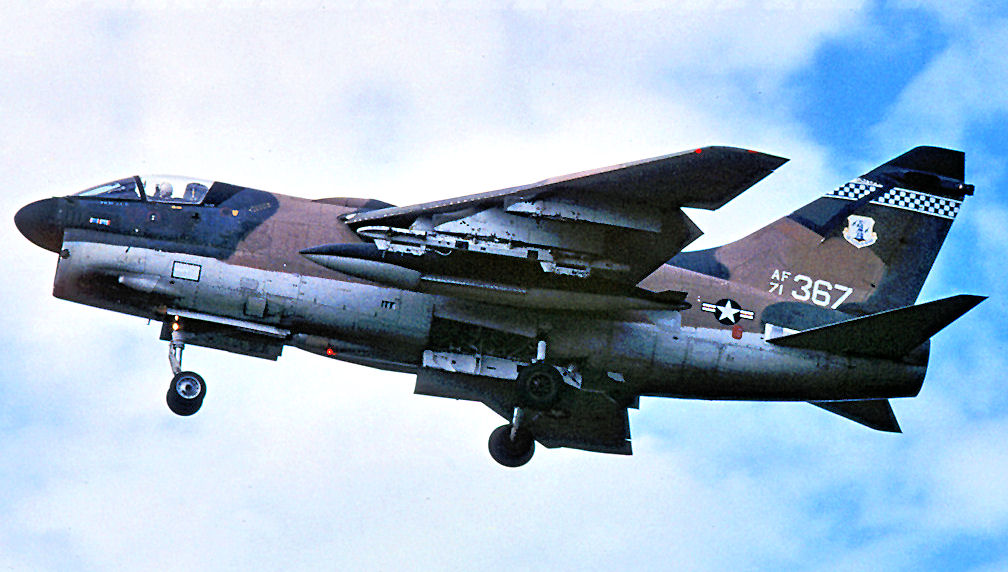
112th Fighter Squadron – Ling-Temco-Vought A-7D-11-CV Corsair II 71–0367, 24 July 1978

The squadron continued normal peacetime training throughout the 1960s. Individual squadron members volunteered for duty during the Vietnam War, however the 112th was not federalized in 1968 as the F-84Fs were not considered front line combat aircraft. In 1971, the squadron retired its Thunderstreaks and converted to the F-100 Super Sabre as a result of the American draw-down from the Vietnam War. In 1975, the 112th began a NATO commitment, deploying five F-100s to Ramstein Air Base, West Germany 9–25 October 1975 for Operation Coronet Razor.

In the summer of 1979, the F-100s were retired, being replaced with A-7D Corsair II subsonic tactical close air support aircraft from Tactical Air Command units that were converting to the new A-10 Thunderbolt II. The aircraft had excellent accuracy with the aid of an automatic electronic navigation and weapons delivery system. Although designed primarily as a ground attack aircraft, it also had limited air-to-air combat capability. It continued its NATO commitment, deploying six A-7D aircraft to RAF Sculthorpe, England in April 1983 for Operation Coronet Miami; eight A-7Ds in June–July 1986 for Coronet Pine, and thirteen A-7Ds in May–June 1989 for Coronet Pine. The 180th Tactical Fighter Group received the Air Force Outstanding Unit Award in 1985 and again in 1990. In 1989, while deployed at Panama for a Coronet Cove deployment, 180th A-7s were employed during Operation Just Cause.

==== Air Combat Command ====
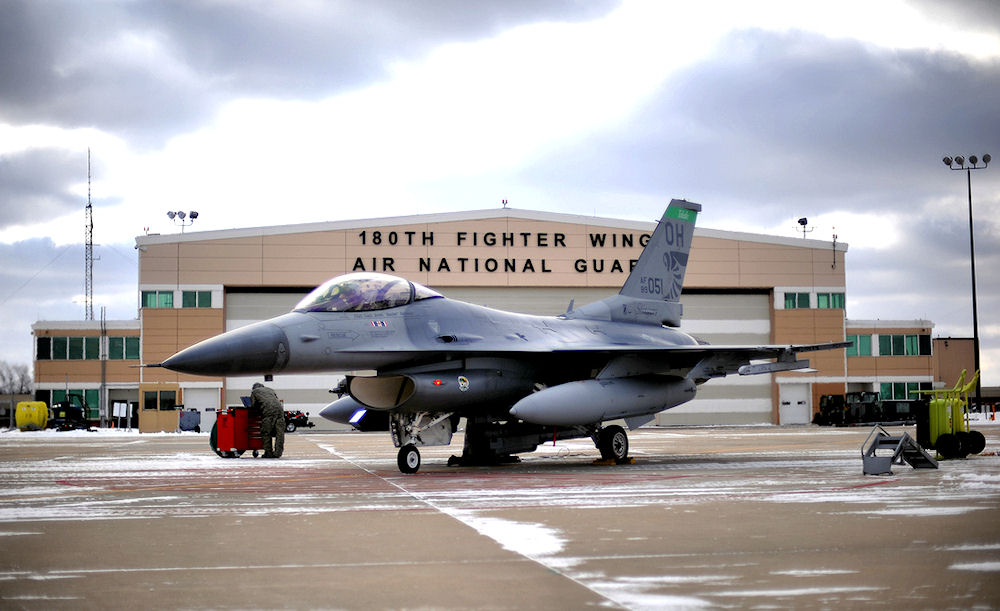
Gassed up with a biofuel, a U.S. Air Force F-16 Falcon from the 180th Fighter Wing ANG goes through prefight checks before taxiing down the runway for take off on 12 February 2012

The 112th TFS did not deploy to Saudi Arabia in 1990 during Operation Desert Shield or Operation Desert Storm as the A-7Ds were considered a second-line aircraft. Squadron volunteers, however were deployed to CENTAF during the crisis and subsequent combat operations.

In March 1992, the 180th adopted the USAF Objective Wing organization and became simply the 180th Fighter Group; the 112th as a Fighter Squadron. On 1 June of that year, Tactical Air Command was inactivated as part of the Air Force restructuring after the end of the Cold War. Air Combat Command (ACC) became the gaining major command for the 180th. Another event in 1992 was the retirement of the A-7Ds, being replaced by Block 25 F-16C/D Fighting Falcons.

The first F-16 to arrive with the 112th FS was a two-seat model, F-16D #83-1175, which was the first F-16D to come off the production line at Fort Worth. It came from the 312th Tactical Fighter Training Squadron at Luke Air Force Base, Arizona on the rare leap year date 29 February 1992. F-16s continued to arrive and the last A-7D departed on 18 May 1992. Many of the block 25s that came from the 363d Tactical Fighter Wing at Shaw Air Force Base, South Carolina were Desert Storm veterans.

The squadron didn't operate the block 25 for very long. Starting in very early 1994 the squadron gave up its block 25s, which it had only flown for a year, for the much more modern block 42s. The block 25s were sent to various units but mostly to Luke AFB, Arizona. A large amount of the block 42s came from Shaw AFB, South Carolina where that base was converting to the block 50.

On 1 October 1995, in accordance with the Air Force One Base-One Wing directive, the 180th Fighter Group was expanded and changed in status to the 180th Fighter Wing. Under the Objective Wing organization, the 112th Fighter Squadron was assigned to the 180th Operations Group. Support groups to the wing were the 180th Maintenance Group, 180th Mission Support Group and the 180th Medical Group.

In mid-1996, the Air Force, in response to budget cuts, and changing world situations, began experimenting with Air Expeditionary organizations. The Air Expeditionary Force concept was developed that would mix Active-Duty, Reserve and Air National Guard elements into a combined force. Instead of entire permanent units deploying as "Provisional" as in the 1991 Gulf War, Expeditionary units are composed of "aviation packages" from several wings, including active-duty Air Force, the Air Force Reserve Command and the Air National Guard, would be married together to carry out the assigned deployment rotation.

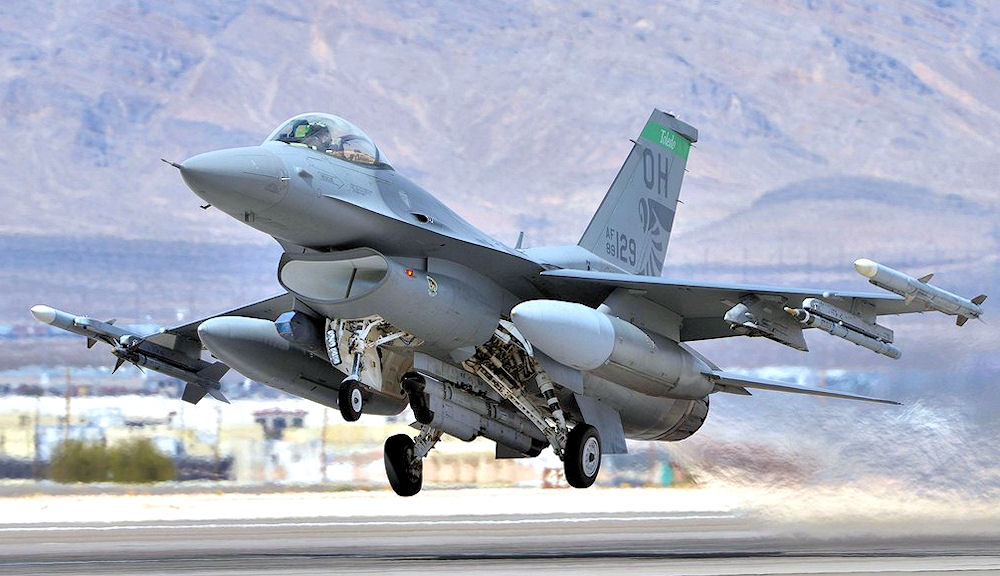
112th Fighter Squadron General Dynamics F-16C Block 42G Fighting Falcon 89-2129

In October 1996, the 112th Expeditionary Fighter Squadron was first formed from squadron personnel and eight aircraft and deployed to Incirlik Air Base, Turkey. The 112th joined with the 124th Expeditionary Fighter Squadron and the 125th Expeditionary Fighter Squadron) as part of a "rainbow" deployment to support Operation Provide Comfort. In January 1997, this changed to Operation Northern Watch just prior to the unit's return to Toledo to enforce the No-Fly-Zones over Iraq. More Operation Northern Watch deployments were made to Incirlik AB by the 112th EFS in 1998, 1999, 2000 and 2002 respectively. The 112th EFS deployed to Ahmad al-Jaber Air Base, Kuwait, for Operation Southern Watch in 2001.

After the events of 11 September 2001 unit members have volunteered to support both Operation Iraqi Freedom and Operation Enduring Freedom in 2005 and again for Operation Iraqi Freedom again in 2007.

==== NORAD air defense ====
In its 2005 BRAC Recommendations, DoD recommended realigning Des Moines Air National Guard Base, Iowa. The F-16 aircraft currently assigned to the 132d Fighter Wing at Des Moines would be redistributed to the 180th Fighter Wing (nine aircraft) Des Moines' F-16s would be distributed to Toledo to support the Homeland Defense Air Sovereignty Alert mission and to consolidate the precision-guided weapon employment capability that exists in the Air National Guard.

In August 2008 the 112th took over the alert role for the region from the Detroit-based Michigan 107th Fighter Squadron which was converting to the A-10 Thunderbolt II in the next year. The 112th took over on 2 October 2008.

Operation Atlantic Resolve Operation Atlantic Resolve refers to military activities in response to Russian operations in Ukraine, mainly the War in Donbas. It was funded under the European Deterrence Initiative. In the wake of Russia's 2014 invasion of Ukraine, the US and the UK took several immediate steps to enhance the deterrence posture along the eastern flank of the North Atlantic Treaty Organization (NATO), including augmenting the air, ground and naval presence in the region, and enhancing previously scheduled exercises.

=== Lineage ===
633d Aero Squadron

- Organized as 112th Aero Squadron on 18 August 1917 (Note: This squadron is not related to the 112th Aero Squadron (Service), which was organized at Chanute Field, Illinois in March 1918, redesignated Squadron B, Chanute Field in July, moved to Souther Field, Georgia in December and returned to the 112th Aero Squadron designation, was redesignated Detachment 1, Aviation Supply Depot, Americus in January 1919 and demobilied near the end of 1919.)

Redesignated 112th Aero Squadron (Supply) on 1 September 1917
Redesignated 633d Aero Squadron (Supply) on 1 February 1918
Demobilized on 19 August 1919
Reconstituted on and consolidated with the 112th Observation Squadron on 20 October 1936

112th Fighter Squadron

- Constituted in the Ohio National Guard in 1921 as the 112th Squadron (Observation)

Redesignated 112th Observation Squadron on 25 January 1923
Organized and Federally recognized on 20 June 1927
Consolidated with the 633d Aero Squadron on 20 October 1936
Ordered to active service on 25 November 1940
Redesignated 112th Observation Squadron (Light) on 13 January 1942
Redesignated 112th Observation Squadron on 4 July 1942
Inactivated on 18 October 1942
Redesignated 112th Liaison Squadron on 2 April 1943
Activated on 30 April 1943
Inactivated on 7 November 1945
Redesignated 112th Bombardment Squadron, Light and allotted to the National Guard on 24 May 1946.
Extended federal recognition on 2 December 1946
Federalized and ordered to active service on 10 February 1951
Redesignated 112th Tactical Reconnaissance Squadron, Night Photo on 10 February 1951
Released from active duty and returned to Ohio state control on 10 July 1952
Redesignated 112th Fighter-Bomber Squadron on 10 July 1952
Redesignated 112th Fighter-Interceptor Squadron on 1 April 1955
Redesignated 112th Tactical Fighter Squadron (Special Delivery) on 1 July 1958
Federalized and ordered to active service on: 1 October 1961
Released from active duty and returned to Indiana state control, 31 August 1962
Redesignated 112th Tactical Fighter Squadron on 31 August 1962
Redesignated 112th Fighter Squadron on 15 March 1992

=== Assignments ===
- Post Headquarters, Kelly Field, 18 August 1917 – 19 August 1919
- Ohio National Guard, 1921

37th Division, 1921
Relieved on 15 February 1929 from assignment to the 37th Division, Concurrently attached to the 37th Division for command and control purposes
45th Observation Group (V Corps), 1 October 1933

- Fourth Corps Area, 25 November 1940
- I Army Corps, Dec 1940
- 65th Observation Group, 1 September 1941 – 18 October 1942
- 10th Reconnaissance Group, 30 April 1943
- II Air Support Command (later II Tactical Air Division), 11 August 1943
- III (later I) Tactical Air Division, 1 January 1944
- United States Strategic Air Forces in Europe, 4 June 1944
- Ninth Air Force, 7 June 1944

Attached principally to Headquarters Command, Supreme Headquarters Allied Expeditionary Forces, 7 June 1944 – 14 July 1945
Elements attached to Headquarters Command, European Theater of Operations, US Army, or sections thereof, 7 June–1 November 1944, 15 November 1944 – 12 February 1945

- US Forces, European Theater, 10 August 1945
- Third Air Force, 5 Sep–7 Nov 1945
- 66th Fighter Wing, 2 December 1946
- 106th Bombardment Group, March 1947
- Tenth Air Force, 1 October 1950
- 117th Tactical Reconnaissance Group, 27 October 1950 – 10 uly 1952
- 121st Fighter Group, later 121st Fighter-Bomber Group, 121st Fighter-Interceptor Group, 121st Tactical Fighter Group), 10 July 1952
- 121st Tactical Fighter Wing, 1 October 1961
- 180th Tactical Fighter Group (later 180th Fighter Group), 15 October 1962
- 180th Operations Group, Oct 1995 – present.

=== Stations ===
- Kelly Field, Texas, 18 August 1917 – 19 August 1919
- Cleveland Hopkins Airport, Ohio 20 June 1927
- Pope Field], North Carolina, 2 December 1940

Flight at Myrtle Beach Municipal Airport, South Carolina, March–December 1941

- Dover Army Air Field, Delaware, 29 December 1941
- Georgetown Airport, South Carolina 21 May 1942
- Lantana Airport, Florida, 30 August 1942
- Birmingham Army Air Field, Alabama, 18 October 1942
- Salinas Army Air Base, California, 30 April 1943
- Redmond Army Air Field, Oregon, c. 19 August 1943

Operated from Camp Abbot, Oregon

- Corvallis Army Air Field, Oregon, 6 November 1943
- Portland Army Air Base, Oregon, 24 Apr–18 May 1944
- RAF Kingston Deverill, Wiltshire, England, 9 June 1944
- RAF Hurst Park (AAF-508), Surrey, England, 20 June 1944
- RAF Heston (AAF-510), Middlesex, England, 30 June 1944

Detachment at Valognes Airfield, France, c. 6 Aug–c. 9 September 1944

- Jullouville Airfield, France, 27 August 1944
- Buc Airfield (Y-4), France, 24 September 1944

Flight operated from Namur Airfield (Y-47), Belgium, 26 Oct 1944–c. 11 February 1945

- AAF Station Frankfurt, Germany, 21 Jun– Aug 1945
- Drew Field, Florida, 5 Sep–7 Nov 1945
- Cleveland Municipal Airport, Ohio, 2 December 1946
- Lawson Air Force Base, Georgia, 1 April 1951 – 27 January 1952
- Wiesbaden Air Base, West Germany, 27 January–30 June 1952
- Toul-Rosières Air Base, France, 1–10 July 1952
- Cleveland Municipal Airport, Ohio, 10 July 1952
- Akron–Canton Airport, Ohio 1 September 1952
- Toledo Municipal Airport (later Toledo Express Airport, Toledo Air National Guard Base), Ohio, 1 April 1956

==== Ohio Air National Guard deployments ====
- Korean War federalization
- 1961 Berlin Crisis federalization
- Operation Provide Comfort II (AEF)

Operated from: Incirlik Air Base, Turkey, (8 F-16s), 9 October 1996 – 7 January 1997

- Operation Northern Watch (AEF)

Operated from: Incirlik Air Base, Turkey, March–May 1998
Operated from: Incirlik Air Base, Turkey, September–November 1999
Operated from: Incirlik Air Base, Turkey, September–2 December 2002

- Operation Southern Watch (AEF)

Operated from: Ahmad al-Jaber Air Base, Kuwait, 16 July–16 August 2001

- Operation Iraqi Freedom (AEF)

Operated from: Balad Air Base, Iraq, August–September 2005
Operated from: Balad Air Base, Iraq, 23 May–11 July 2007
Operated from: Balad Air Base, Iraq, 5 October–13 December 2008

=== Aircraft ===
- PT-1, BT-1, O-2, O-11, 1927–1931
- Douglas O-38, 1930–1941
- North American O-47, 1940–1942
- O-49 Vigilant, 1941–1942
- O-57 Grasshopper, 1941–1942
- O-58 Grasshopper, 1942
- L-5 Sentinel, 1943–1945
- L-2, L-4, L-6, A-24, 1943–1944
- Cessna UC-78, 1944–1945
- L-1, C-47, 1945
- RB-26C Invader, 1946–1952
- F-51H Mustang, 1952–1956
- T-28A Trojan, 1956–1959
- F-84F Thunderstreak, 1959–1971
- F-100D/F Super Sabre, 1971–1979
- A-7D/K Corsair II, 1979–1991
- Block 25 F-16C/D Fighting Falcon, 1991–1994
- Block 42 F-16C/D Fighting Falcon, 1994 – present

== In popular culture ==
The 112th Fighter Squadron appears in the DCS World 3rd party campaign F-16 Arctic Thunder by Reflected Simulations.

== See also ==
- List of American aero squadrons
- List of observation squadrons of the United States Army National Guard
