= List of Drake University people =

This is a list of notable alumni and faculty of Drake University.

== President ==
- 1881–1882: George Thomas Carpenter
- 1882–1893: George Thomas Carpenter (as chancellor)
- 1894–1897: Barton O. Aylesworth (as acting chancellor)
- 1897–1902: William Bayard Craig (as chancellor)
- 1902–1903: Hill McClelland Bell (as vice chancellor)
- 1903–1918: Hill McClelland Bell
- 1918–1923: Arthur Holmes
- 1922–1923: Daniel Walter Morehouse (as acting president)
- 1923–1941: Daniel Walter Morehouse
- 1941–1964: Henry Gadd Harmon
- 1966–1971: Paul Frederick Sharp
- 1972–1985: Wilbur C. Miller
- 1985–1998: Michael Ferrari
- 1998: Robert D. Ray (as interim president)
- 1999–2015: David Maxwell
- 2015–present: Earl F. Martin

== Notable alumni ==
=== Politics and military ===
- Brenna Bird, Iowa attorney general (2023–)
- Robert D. Blue, governor of Iowa (1945–1949)
- Terry Branstad, former governor of Iowa (1983–1999, 2011–2017) and U.S. ambassador to China (2017–2020), longest-serving state governor in U.S. history
- Bonnie Campbell, lawyer, former Iowa attorney general (1991–1995) and gubernatorial candidate
- Johnnie Carson, career diplomat
- Merwin Coad, Iowa congressman (1957–1963)
- Joe Crail, California congressman (1927–1933)
- Chet Culver, former governor of Iowa (2007–2011)
- Cassius Clay Dowell, Iowa congressman (1915–1935, 1937–1940)
- Abby Finkenauer, former Iowa congresswoman (2019–2021)
- Guy Gillette, Iowa congressman (1933–1936) and senator (1936–1945, 1949–1955)
- Robert K. Goodwin, Iowa congressman (1940–1941)
- Adam Gregg, lieutenant governor of Iowa (2019–2024)
- Carl W. Hoffman, U.S. Marine Corps major general
- Ron Kouchi, president of the Hawaii State Senate
- Darrell R. Lindsey, Medal of Honor recipient
- Zach Nunn, U.S. representative from Iowa's 3rd district (2023–)
- Jim Nussle, former Iowa congressman (1991–2007) and director of the Office of Management and Budget
- Stephen Rapp, former U.S. ambassador-at-large for War Crimes Issues in the Office of Global Criminal Justice
- Clark R. Rasmussen, served in the Iowa House of Representatives 1965–1967
- Robert D. Ray, governor of Iowa (1969–1983)
- David N. Senty, retired U.S. Air Force major general
- Neal Smith, former Iowa congressman (1959–1995)
- Sara Taylor, former deputy assistant to the president; director of Political Affairs in the George W. Bush administration
- Hubert Utterback, Iowa congressman (1935–1937)
- Frederick T. Weber, naval aviator who died at the Battle of Midway
- David Young, former Iowa congressman (2015–2019) and current member of the Iowa House of Representatives (2023–)

=== Law ===
- Mark Cady, lawyer, chief justice, Supreme Court of Iowa (2011–2019)
- Roxanne Conlin, lawyer, former U.S. attorney for the Southern District of Iowa (1977–1981), and Iowa senate and gubernatorial candidate
- Robert Cowen, senior judge on the United States Court of Appeals for the Third Circuit
- George Gardner Fagg, United States federal judge on the United States Court of Appeals for the Eighth Circuit
- Cleon H. Foust, Indiana attorney general (1947–1949)
- Joseph C. Howard Sr., judge, United States District Court for the District of Maryland (1979–2000)
- Louis A. Lavorato, lawyer, chief justice, Supreme Court of Iowa (2000–2006)
- Ronald Olson, partner in the Los Angeles office of the law firm of Munger Tolles & Olson LLP
- Wendy J. Olson, United States attorney for the District of Idaho (2010–2017)
- Marsha Ternus, lawyer, chief justice, Supreme Court of Iowa (2006–2010)
- Terry Trieweiler, Montana Supreme Court justice, Montana Lawyer of the Year

=== Arts and literature ===
- Joanne Aono, artist
- Rose Bampton, principal singer at Metropolitan Opera during 1930s and 1940s
- Bruce Brubaker, musician
- Bill Bryson, author
- Marsha Wilson Chall, children's author
- Gwen M. Davidson, artist
- Mark Doty, poet
- Susan Glaspell, author
- Joseph Hermann, conductor, clarinetist and music educator; president of American Bandmasters Association
- Stanley Hess, artist, instrument maker, educator
- Syleena Johnson, R&B singer, actress, and reality television personality
- Ira Levin, author of Rosemary's Baby, The Boys from Brazil, The Stepford Wives, Deathtrap
- Sherrill Milnes, operatic baritone
- Carol Morris, actress and Miss Universe 1956
- Dick Oatts, jazz saxophonist
- Phil Stong, author of State Fair, novel filmed three times
- Matthew Stover, author of fantasy and science fiction, including novelization of Star Wars: Revenge of the Sith
- Kim Uchiyama, abstract painter
- Roger Williams, musician and composer
- Bart Yates, author

=== Entertainment and media ===
- Steve Allen, comedian, actor and first host of The Tonight Show (attended, did not graduate)
- Lew Anderson, musician and voice of Clarabell the Clown
- John August, screenwriter
- Steve Bannos, film actor and writer
- Mary Bock, journalist
- Joseph Chaikin, founder of the Open Theater, theater director, actor, author
- Lee Ann Colacioppo, nee Fleet, editor of the Denver Post
- Julee Cruise, singer and actress
- Mark DeCarlo, actor, comedian, host of Taste of America television show, cartoon voice actor
- Anna DeShawn, media personality and podcaster
- Jerry Douglas, writer and director, notably of gay pornographic films
- Michael Emerson, two-time Emmy Award-winning actor
- Bridget Flanery, actress
- Lambert Hillyer, silent film director
- Dave Mallow, voice-over artist for television, film, animation, commercials, video games
- Al McCoy, sports broadcaster, voice of the Phoenix Suns
- Clark R. Mollenhoff, Pulitzer Prize-winning journalist
- Jeremy Piven, three-time Emmy Award-winning actor (attended, did not graduate)
- Ray Rizzo, three-time Pokémon Video Game World Champion
- Wynn Speece, "Neighbor Lady", WNAX radio station
- Jim Uhls, screenwriter, including the script for Fight Club
- Sam Wanamaker, actor and director
- Larry Whiteside, award-winning sportswriter
- Rex Wockner, journalist
- David L. Wolper, television and film producer

=== Business ===
- Archie R. Boe, former chairman and CEO of the Allstate Corporation; former president of Sears, Roebuck
- George A. Cohon, founder of McDonald's Restaurants of Canada Limited and McDonald's in Russia
- Kenneth A. Macke, former CEO and chairman of Dayton Hudson Corporation (since renamed Target Corporation)
- John M. Mathew, president and chief executive officer of Wick Communications Company
- Dwight D. Opperman, former CEO of West Publishing Company, after whom Drake's law library is named
- Johnny C. Taylor Jr., president and CEO of Society for Human Resource Management
- Fred L. Turner, former chairman of McDonald's

=== Science and academia ===
- Jon Bowermaster, oceans expert, journalist, filmmaker and adventurer
- W. Dean Eastman, award-winning educator
- Kate Stevens Harpel, teacher, physician
- Cuthbert Hurd, computer pioneer
- Rachelle Keck, academic administrator
- Thomas Kunz, researcher notable for insights into bat ecology
- Timothy Ley, hematologist, oncologist and cancer biologist
- William A. Staples, president of the University of Houston–Clear Lake
- Brian Wansink, Cornell University professor and author of Mindless Eating: Why We Eat More Than We Think
- Harley A. Wilhelm, Manhattan Project scientist and co-inventor of the Ames Process for purifying uranium, co-founder of the Ames Laboratory for the U.S. Dept. of Energy

=== Athletics ===
- Chris Ash, football coach, former head coach at Rutgers University
- Lucas Bartlett, professional soccer player
- Tom Bienemann, former NFL defensive end for the Chicago Cardinals
- Johnny Bright, member of the College and Canadian Football Hall of Fame
- Waldo Don Carlos, retired NFL center for the Green Bay Packers
- Billy Cundiff, NFL placekicker
- Keno Davis, basketball coach, 2008 Associated Press College Basketball Coach of the Year
- Versil Deskin, former NFL player
- Dave Doeren, head football coach at North Carolina State University
- Pat Dunsmore, former NFL player
- Robert Helmick, president of the United States Olympic Committee
- Ezra Hendrickson, professional soccer player and coach
- York Hentschel, CFL player and 3-time Grey Cup champion
- Maury John, Hall of Fame basketball coach: Final Four (1969), and Elite 8 (1970 and 1971)
- Zach Johnson, professional golfer, winner of the 2007 Masters and 2015 Open Championship
- Karl Kassulke, former NFL player
- Wayne Kreklow, retired professional basketball player
- Kevin Little, 1997 world indoor champion, 200-meter dash
- Lewis Lloyd, retired professional basketball player
- John Lynch, former NFL player
- Pug Manders, former NFL player
- Willie McCarter, former NBA player
- Dennis McKnight, former NFL player
- McCoy McLemore, former NBA player
- Jerry Mertens, former NFL player
- Duane Miller, former NFL player, Drake Football record holder
- Bill Myles, former football coach for Nebraska Cornhuskers football and Ohio State Buckeyes football
- Dick Nesbitt, former NFL player
- Bob Netolicky, professional basketball player
- Charlie Partridge, football coach, former head coach at Florida Atlantic University
- Mike Samples, former Canadian Football League player
- Eric Saubert, professional American football player, Super Bowl LX Champion
- Boris Shlapak, professional football and soccer player for the Baltimore Colts and Chicago Sting respectively
- Lee Stange, former MLB pitcher and MLB pitching coach
- Bill Stevenson, CFL all-star and record 7-time Grey Cup champion
- Ann Swisshelm, two-time Olympic curler
- Dan Turk, former NFL player; transferred after his sophomore season
- Dani Tyler, softball player and 1996 Olympic gold medalist
- Rick Wanamaker, winner of the 1971 Pan American Games decathlon
- Willie Wise, professional basketball player
- Felix Wright, former CFL and NFL safety

== Notable faculty ==
- Chester C. Cole, Drake University Law School founder and professor, University of Iowa College of Law co-founder and professor, chief justice of the Iowa Supreme Court
- George Gallup, head of Journalism Department (1928–1931)
- Frank Irving Herriott (1868–1941), professor of economics (1903–1919), political science and sociology (1903–1941)
- Jacqui Kalin (born 1989), American-Israeli professional basketball player
- Robert Kibbee (died 1982), chancellor of the City University of New York
- Edward Mansfield, Iowa Supreme Court justice and adjunct law professor
- Milman Parry, professor of Greek and Latin, 1928–29
- Ione Genevieve Shadduck (1923–2022), led women's physical education program in the late 1970s
- Lewis Worthington Smith, professor of English
- Terri Vaughan, visiting professor in the College of Business and Public Administration
- Francis Wilhoit, Political Science professor
- George G. Wright, Iowa Supreme Court justice, Drake University Law School professor, University of Iowa College of Law co-founder, United States Senator from Iowa
- Oleg Zatsarinny, senior research scholar and lecturer (Atomic Physics)
