= Wilhoit =

Wilhoit may refer to:

- Wilhoit, Arizona, a community in the United States
- Francis M. Wilhoit, American political scientist
- Frank Wilhoit (composer)
- James Wilhoit, American football player
- Lisa Wilhoit, American actress on the television show My So-Called Life
