= 384th Air Refueling Squadron =

US Air Force unit

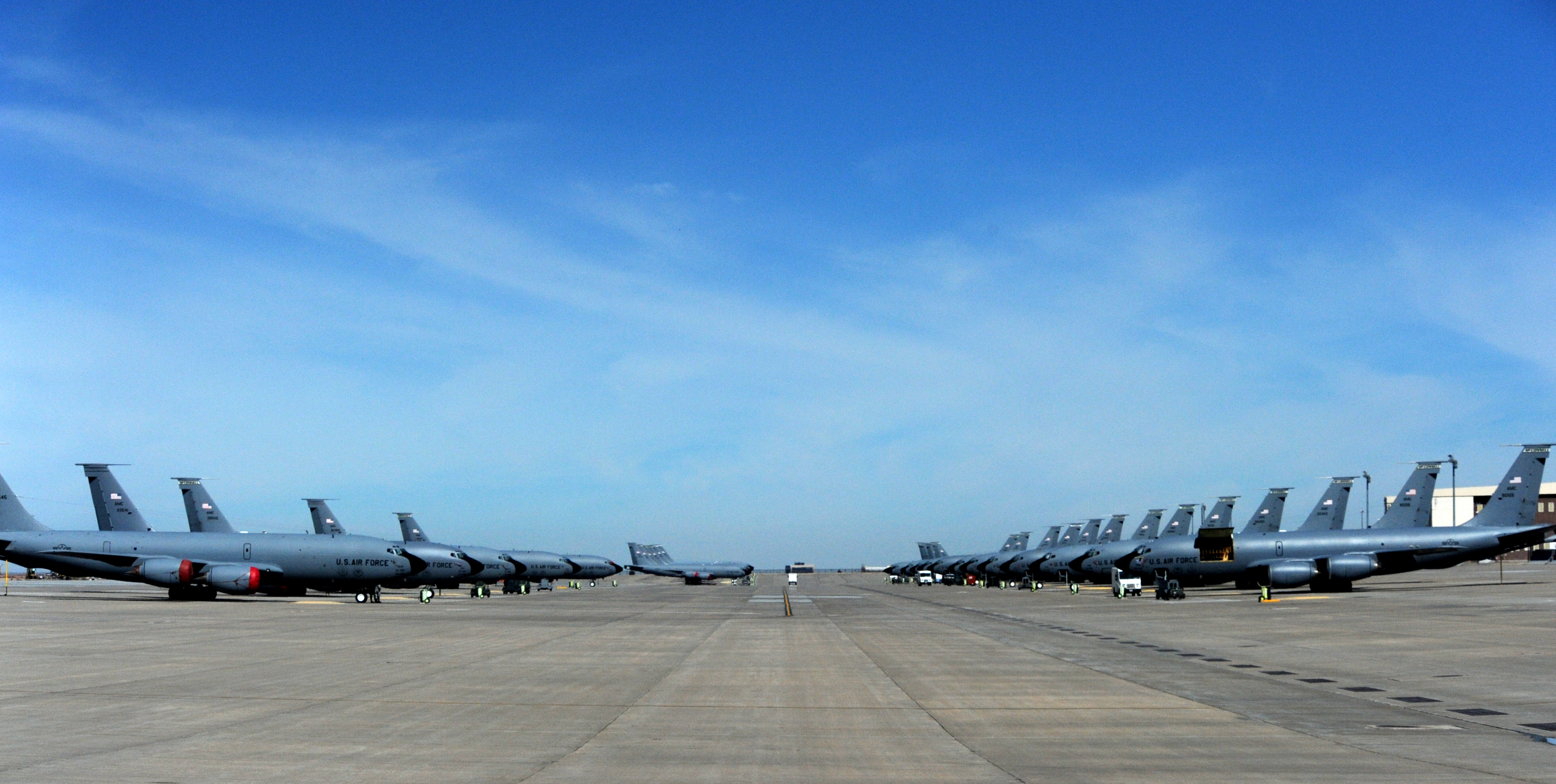
- KC-135 Stratotankers at McConnell AFB in 2014
- Active: 1943–1946; 1955–1966; 1973–present
- Country: United States
- Branch: United States Air Force
- Role: Aerial refueling
- Part of: Air Mobility Command
- Nickname: Squarepatchers
- Colors: Maroon/Silver
- Engagements: European Theater of Operations
- Decorations: Distinguished Unit Citation; Meritorious Unit Award; Air Force Outstanding Unit Award; French Croix de Guerre with Palm

Insignia
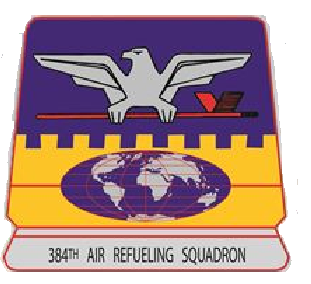
- 384th Air Refueling Squadron emblem (approved 30 June 1959) (Note: This patch has continued to be used by the squadron, despite the official design being placed on a disc to comply with Air Force regulations. This usage is the basis for the nickname "Squarepatchers", even though it is more rectangular than square. Thornbury, 384th ARS deactivates [sic])

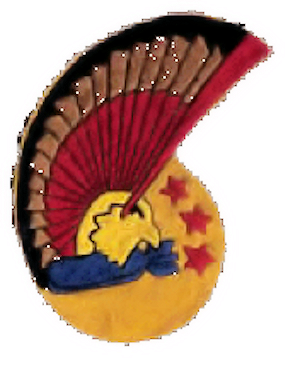
- Patch with 584th Bombardment Squadron emblem (Note: Approved 31 December 1943. Description: Over and through a golden orange dicsc, a stylized falcon white, outlined black, with wing outspread fanwise, red, tan, and brown, perched on a light turquoise blue aerial bomb falling to base, in sinister chief three red stars arranged circumferentiially.)
- World War II fuselage code: K5

The 384th Air Refueling Squadron is an active United States Air Force unit, stationed at Fairchild Air Force Base, Washington, where it is assigned to the 92d Operations Group and operates the Boeing KC-135 Stratotanker aircraft conducting air refueling missions.

The first predecessor of the squadron is the 584th Bombardment Squadron, a Martin B-26 Marauder unit that served in the European Theater of Operations, where it earned a Distinguished Unit Citation and a French Croix de Guerre with Palm. After V-E Day, it served with the occupation forces in Germany until inactivating in 1946.

The 384th was activated in 1955 at Westover Air Force Base, Massachusetts, where it served as a Strategic Air Command aerial refueling unit until inactivating in 1966. It was activated again in 1973 and has performed global refueling missions since then. The two squadrons were consolidated into a single unit in 1985.

== History ==
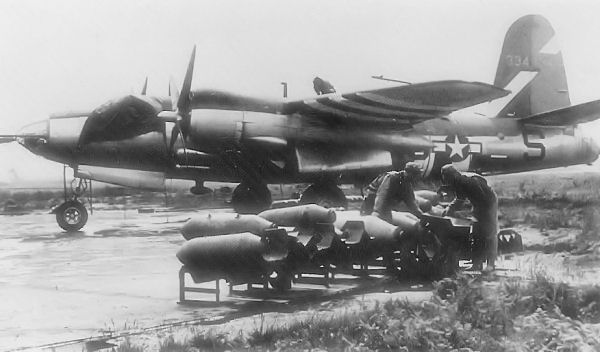
Loading bombs on a squadron B-26 Marauder

=== World War II ===
==== Training in the United States ====
The 584th Bombardment Squadron was activated at MacDill Field, Florida as one of the original four squadrons of the 394th Bombardment Group. It began to train with the Martin B-26 Marauder, performing most of its training at Kellogg Field, Michigan. It departed for the European Theater of Operations (ETO) in mid-February 1944.

==== Combat in Europe ====
The squadron was established at RAF Boreham, which was to be its station until after D-Day, in mid March, and flew its first combat mission on 23 March, less than two weeks after its arrival in the ETO. It helped prepare for the invasion of Normandy by participating in Operation Crossbow, striking V-1 flying bomb and V-2 rocket launch sites. It also carried out attacks on marshalling yards, bridges, gun emplacements and airfields. Not all targets were near the intended invasion landing areas. For example, in April, the squadron participated in a heavy attack on the marshalling yard at Mechlen, Belgium.Later that month, it encountered particularly heavy flak in an attack on Heuringhem, in which the airplane leading the group formation received 264 holes. However, bombing results were not as accurate as desired, and the squadron was removed from operations for a week for additional training. On D-Day it attacked gun emplacements at Cherbourg Naval Base, afterwards striking lines of communications, fuel storage sites and enemy strong points.

The squadron moved to RAF Holmsley South on 24 July, in a general move by the units of the 98th Bombardment Wing to bases closer to the invasion area, and on the following day supported Operation Cobra, the breakout at Saint Lo. Between 7 and 9 August, the squadron made five attacks on strongly defended targets in northern France. This operation resulted in the award of the Distinguished Unit Citation to the squadron. Later that month, the squadron moved to its first base on the continent, Tour-en-Bessin Airfield, in France. From this base, the 584th attacked strong points at Brest, France and later began attacking targets in Germany from its bases on the continent. During the Battle of the Bulge, the squadron attacked lines of communications to prevent reinforcements from reaching the attacking German forces. it participated in Operation Clarion, intended to destroy the remaining elements of the German transportation system. In addition to attacking transportation and storage facilities, toward the end of the war, the squadron dropped propaganda leaflets over occupied territory, which included the squadron's last combat mission.

==== Occupation and inactivation ====
Following V-E Day, the squadron moved to Kitzingen Airfield, Germany, where it became part of the Army of Occupation. In December, it began to transition into the Douglas A-26 Invader. However, most personnel were rotating home for separation from the military, and in February, the squadron was transferred on paper to Bolling Field, District of Columbia and was inactivated there at the end of March.

=== Air refueling operations ===
==== KC-97 era ====
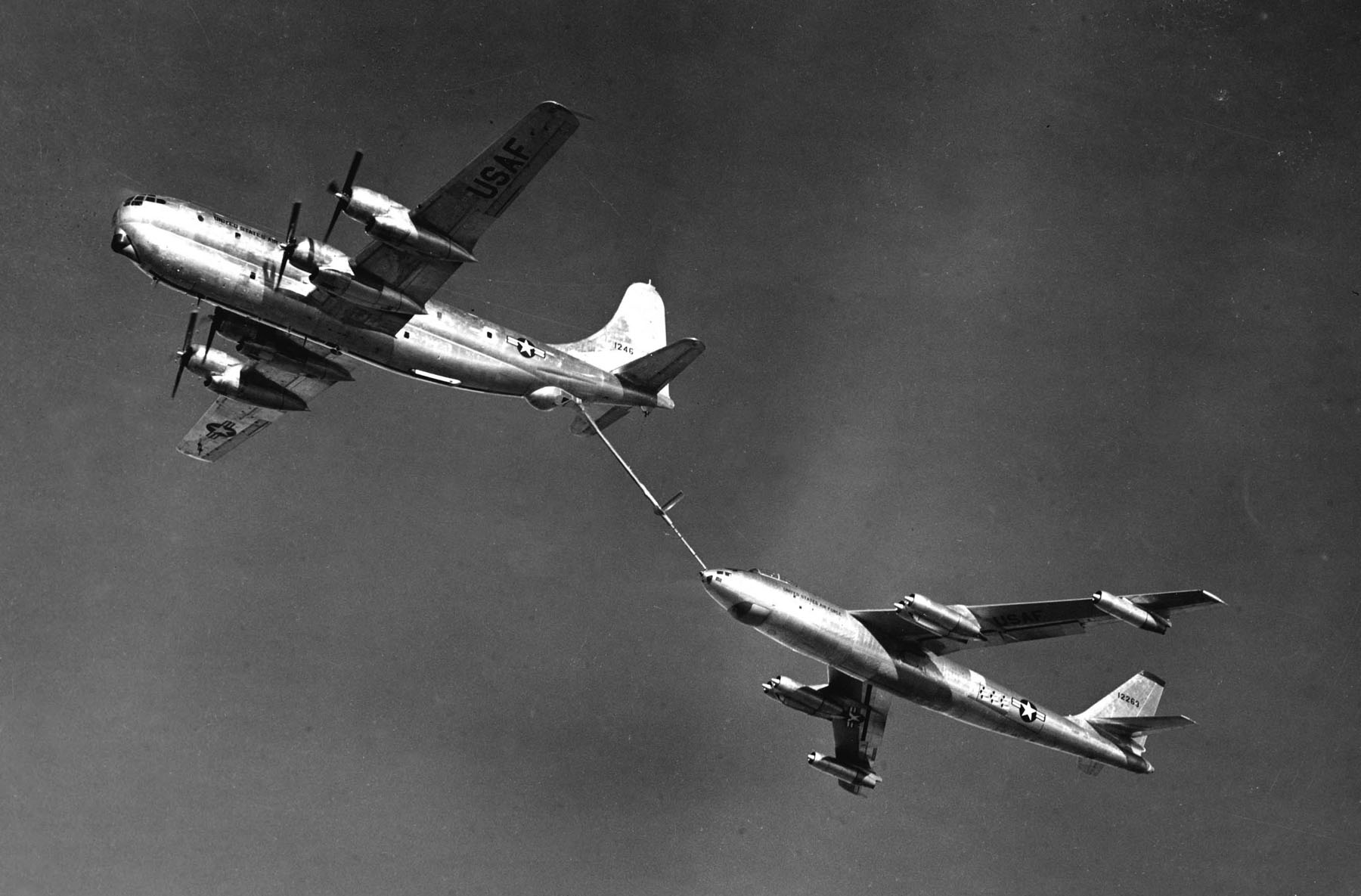
KC-97 refueling a B-47 (Note: Aircraft are Boeing KC-97F-50-BO Stratofreighter, serial 51-246 and Boeing B-47B-45-BW Stratojet, serial 51-2263. The KC-97 was retired to the Military Aircraft Storage and Disposition Center on 6 April 1964.)

The squadron was activated at Westover Air Force Base, Massachusetts on 1 April 1955, when Strategic Air Command (SAC) took over Westover from Military Air Transport Service and organized the 4050th Air Refueling Wing there. This was part of a program by SAC to station most of its tankers into the northeastern United States. The 4050th was one of two tanker wings created in New England. This based the squadron ahead of the faster Boeing B-47 Stratojets it would refuel if the Emergency War Order were executed, and on their programmed route.

The 384th was equipped with Boeing KC-97 Stratofreighters. It refueled SAC bombers, primarily in the North Atlantic area, and Tactical Air Command aircraft, primarily for fighter deployments and unit movements. In addition to deployments of individual crews and aircraft, the squadron deployed as a unit to Ernest Harmon Air Force Base, Newfoundland in the spring of 1956 and 1957 and to Lajes Air Base, Azores (Operation Short Punt) in the fall of 1963.

Starting in 1960, one third of the squadron's aircraft were maintained on fifteen minute alert, fully fueled and ready for combat to reduce vulnerability to a Soviet missile strike. This was increased to half the squadron's aircraft in 1962. Ground alert for the KC-97 terminated on 10 November 1965.

The squadron's parent 4050th Air Refueling Wing was replaced by the newly constituted 499th Air Refueling Wing which assumed its mission, personnel, and equipment on 1 January 1963. During the Cuban Missile Crisis SAC went to DEFCON 2 on 22 October 1962, putting all the squadron's planes on alert. On 29 October additional KC-97s were dispersed to bases in Canada and the Azores to provide refueling for B-47s on increased alert status. On 21 November SAC went to DEFCON 3. Dispersed tankers were recalled on 24 November and on 27 November SAC returned to normal alert posture.

However, the slow speed of the propeller-driven KC-97 made it incompatible with jet bombers, which had to descend from their cruising altitude to one where the KC-97 operated, resulting in the bomber burning much of the fuel it had just received in its climb back to its operating altitude. Although this problem was alleviated by adding two General Electric J47 jets to the KC-97, the only real solution was an all jet tanker. The squadron began to draw down, losing its last aircraft in late 1965 and no longer being manned after February 1966. It was inactivated along with its parent 499th Air Refueling Wing on 25 June 1966.

==== KC-135 era ====
The squadron was reactivated in September 1973 at McConnell Air Force Base, Kansas, where it was assigned to the 384th Bombardment Wing, flying Boeing KC-135A Stratotankers. It flew worldwide aerial refueling sorties. In September 1985, the 384th was consolidated with the 584th Bombardment Squadron, in a program to unite World War II units with tactical units that had been activated after the war.

On 18 December 1989, The squadron deployed aircraft and personnel to Barksdale Air Force Base, Louisiana. The following day, these elements flew to designated refueling tracks to support airlift aircraft transporting ground troops to Panama in Operation Just Cause. Refueling sorties also supported McDonnell Douglas F-15 Eagles flying fighter cap near Cuba, General Dynamics EF-111 Ravens providing jamming and Boeing E-3 Sentry aircraft providing command and control of the force. It supported Desert Shield and Desert Storm from by deploying aircrews and aircraft assigned to provisional units from August 1990 to March 1991.

The 384th went through a series of assignment changes in the early 1990s due to organizational changes in the Air Force. The implementation of the Objective Wing organization brought the flying elements of the 384th Wing together under the 384th Operations Group. In June 1992, SAC was disestablished and its refueling units were transferred to Air Mobility Command (AMC). As a result, the squadron was separated from the 384th Bomb Wing and assigned to the 19th Operations Group. This assignment lasted until 1994, when AMC assumed control of McConnell and the squadron was assigned to the 22d Operations Group. The squadron's personnel and equipment was withdrawn at the end of September 2016 and the squadron remained at McConnell as a paper unit as the 22nd began its conversion to the Boeing KC-46 Pegasus. (Note: The 22nd Wing Public Affairs office apparently believed the squadron was inactivated. See Thornbury. However, the Air Force Historical Research Agency has consistently shown the squadron as active at this time. Dollman, TSG David (19 August 2016). "Factsheet 384 Air Refueling Squadron (AMC)". Air Force Historical Research Agency. Archived from the original on 21 August 2022., Musser (2022 version of Factsheet))

The squadron moved to Fairchild Air Force Base, Washington on 23 March 2017, there it once again was manned and equipped. The date was chosen because it was the 73d anniversary of the squadron's first combat mission during World War II.

== Lineage ==
584th Bombardment Squadron

- Constituted as the 584th Bombardment Squadron (Medium) on 15 February 1943

Activated on 5 March 1943
Redesignated 584th Bombardment Squadron, Medium on 9 October 1944
Redesignated 584th Bombardment Squadron, Light on 3 December 1945
Inactivated on 31 March 1946
Consolidated with the 384th Air Refueling Squadron on 19 September 1985

384th Air Refueling Squadron

- Constituted on 3 March 1955

Activated on 1 April 1955
Discontinued and inactivated on 25 June 1966

- Redesignated 384th Air Refueling Squadron, Heavy on 19 June 1973

Activated on 30 September 1973
Consolidated with the 584th Bombardment Squadron on 19 September 1985
Redesignated 384th Air Refueling Squadron on 1 September 1991

=== Assignments ===
- 394th Bombardment Group, 5 March 1943 – 31 March 1946
- 4050th Air Refueling Wing, 1 April 1955 (attached to Eighth Air Force 27 April – 27 June 1956, 21 May – 25 June 1957)
- 499th Air Refueling Wing, 1 January 1963 – 25 June 1966
- 384th Bombardment Wing, 30 September 1973 – 30 September 1991
- 384th Operations Group 30 September 1991
- 19th Operations Group, 1 June 1992
- 22d Operations Group, 1 January 1994
- 92d Operations Group, 23 March 2017 – present

=== Stations ===
- MacDill Field, Florida, 5 March 1943
- Ardmore Army Air Field, Oklahoma, 12 July 1943
- Kellogg Field, Michigan, 23 August 1943 – 15 February 1944
- RAF Boreham (Station 161), England, 11 March 1944
- RAF Holmsley South (Station 455), England, 24 July 1944
- Tour-en-Bessin Airfield (A-13), France, 20 August 1944
- Orleans-Bricy Airfield (A-50), France, 21 September 1944
- Cambrai-Niergnies Airport (A-74 ), France, 8 October 1944
- Venlo Airfield (Y-55 ), Netherlands, 5 May 1945
- Kitzingen Airfield (R-6), Germany, September 1945
- Bolling Field, Washington, DC, 15 February 1946 – 1 March 1946
- Westover Air Force Base, Massachusetts, 1 April 1955 – 25 June 1966 (deployed to Ernest Harmon Air Force Base, Newfoundland 27 April – 27 June 1956, 21 May – 25 June 1957); Lajes Air Base, Azores (28 September – c. 28 December 1963)
- McConnell Air Force Base, Kansas, 30 September 1973
- Fairchild Air Force Base, Washington, 23 March 2017 – present

=== Aircraft ===
- Martin B-26 Marauder (1943–1945)
- Douglas A-26 Invader (1945–1946)
- Boeing KC-97 Stratofreighter (1955–1965)
- Boeing KC-135A Stratotanker (1973–1977)
- Boeing KC-135R/T Stratotanker (1978–2016, 2017–present)

=== Awards and campaigns ===
Award streamer	Award	Dates	Notes
	Distinguished Unit Citation	7–9 August 1944	France, 584th Bombardment Squadron
	Air Force Meritorious Unit Award	1 August 2009 – 31 July 2010	384th Air Refueling Squadron
	Air Force Meritorious Unit Award	1 August 2010 – 31 July 2011	384th Air Refueling Squadron
	Air Force Meritorious Unit Award	1 August 2011 – 31 July 2012	384th Air Refueling Squadron
	Air Force Meritorious Unit Award	1 August 2012 – 31 July 2013	384th Air Refueling Squadron
	Air Force Meritorious Unit Award	1 August 2013 – 31 July 2014	384th Air Refueling Squadron
	Air Force Meritorious Unit Award	1 August 2014 – 31 July 2015	384th Air Refueling Squadron
	Air Force Meritorious Unit Award	1 August 2016 – 31 July 2017	
	Air Force Outstanding Unit Award	8 February 1956 – 1 December 1959	384th Air Refueling Squadron
	Air Force Outstanding Unit Award	1 Jul 1974 – 30 June 1976	384th Air Refueling Squadron
	Air Force Outstanding Unit Award	1 July 1976 – 30 June 1978	384th Air Refueling Squadron
	Air Force Outstanding Unit Award	1 July 1980 – 30 June 1981	384th Air Refueling Squadron
	Air Force Outstanding Unit Award	1 July 1987 – 30 June 1989	384th Air Refueling Squadron
	Air Force Outstanding Unit Award	30 May 1990 – 29 May 1992	384th Air Refueling Squadron
	Air Force Outstanding Unit Award	1 June 1994 – 31 May 1996	384th Air Refueling Squadron
	Air Force Outstanding Unit Award	1 August 1999 – 31 July 2000	384th Air Refueling Squadron
	Air Force Outstanding Unit Award	1 August 2000 – 31 July 2001	384th Air Refueling Squadron
	Air Force Outstanding Unit Award	1 August 2002 – 31 July 2004	384th Air Refueling Squadron
	Air Force Outstanding Unit Award	1 August 2004 – 31 July 2005	384th Air Refueling Squadron
	Air Force Outstanding Unit Award	1 August 2005 – 31 July 2006	384th Air Refueling Squadron
	Air Force Outstanding Unit Award	1 August 2006 – 31 July 2008	384th Air Refueling Squadron
	Air Force Outstanding Unit Award	1 August 2008 – 31 July 2009	384th Air Refueling Squadron
	Air Force Outstanding Unit Award	1 August 2015 – 31 July 2016	384th Air Refueling Squadron
	Air Force Outstanding Unit Award	1 August 2015 – 31 August 2017	384th Air Refueling Squadron
	Air Force Outstanding Unit Award	1 September 2017 – 31 August 2018	384th Air Refueling Squadron
	Air Force Outstanding Unit Award	1 September 2018 – 31 August 2019	384th Air Refueling Squadron
	Air Force Outstanding Unit Award	1 September 2019 – 31 August 2020	384th Air Refueling Squadron
	French Croix de Guerre with Palm	6 June – 14 September 1944	584th Bombardment Squadron

Campaign Streamer	Campaign	Dates	Notes
	Air Offensive, Europe	11 March 1944 – 5 June 1944	584th Bombardment Squadron
	Normandy	6 June 1944 – 24 July 1944	584th Bombardment Squadron
	Northern France	25 July 1944 – 14 September 1944	584th Bombardment Squadron
	Rhineland	15 September 1944 – 21 March 1945	584th Bombardment Squadron
	Ardennes-Alsace	16 December 1944 – 25 January 1945	584th Bombardment Squadron
	Central Europe	22 March 1944 – 21 May 1945	584th Bombardment Squadron
	Global War on Terror Expeditionary Medal		384th Air Refueling Squadron
