= Darrell R. Lindsey =

United States Army Air Forces Medal of Honor recipient

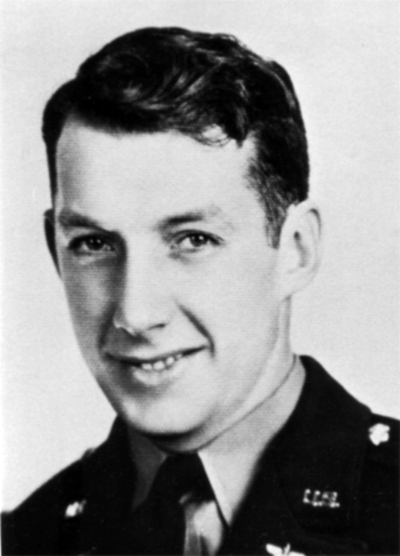
- Capt Darrell R Lindsey, Medal of Honor recipient
- Born: December 30, 1919; Jefferson, Iowa
- Died: August 9, 1944 (aged 25); L'Isle-Adam, France
- Burial place: A.B.M.C. Ardennes Cemetery (Wall of the Missing), Neuvile-En-Condroz, Belgium
- Military career
- Allegiance: United States of America
- Branch: United States Army Air Forces
- Service years: 1942-1944
- Rank: Captain
- Units: 585th Bombardment Squadron, 394th Bombardment Group
- Conflicts: World War II
- Awards: Medal of Honor; Purple Heart; Air Medal (9)

Darrell Robins Lindsey (December 30, 1919 – August 9, 1944) was a bomber pilot in the U.S. Army Air Forces during World War II and a posthumous recipient of the Medal of Honor.

== Early life ==
Lindsey was born in Jefferson, Iowa, to Jesse Lyle and Grace Alice Lindsey. After graduating from high school in Fort Dodge in 1938, he attended Buena Vista University in Storm Lake for one year before transferring to Drake University in Des Moines. He enlisted as an aviation cadet at Fort Des Moines on January 16, 1942.

== Military career ==
He trained at Visalia, Lemoore Army Air Field and Victorville Army Air Field in California, receiving his pilot's wings and commission as a second lieutenant in August 1942.

=== World War II ===
Lindsey was also trained as a bombardier at Kirtland Field, New Mexico, and in 1943 was assigned to the 314th Bomb Squadron at MacDill Field, Florida, with the rank of first lieutenant. He was transferred to Kellogg Field, Michigan, in September 1943, and assigned to the 585th Bomb Squadron, 394th Bomb Group (Medium), a Martin B-26 Marauder outfit. Promoted to captain in December, he was assigned as a flight commander.

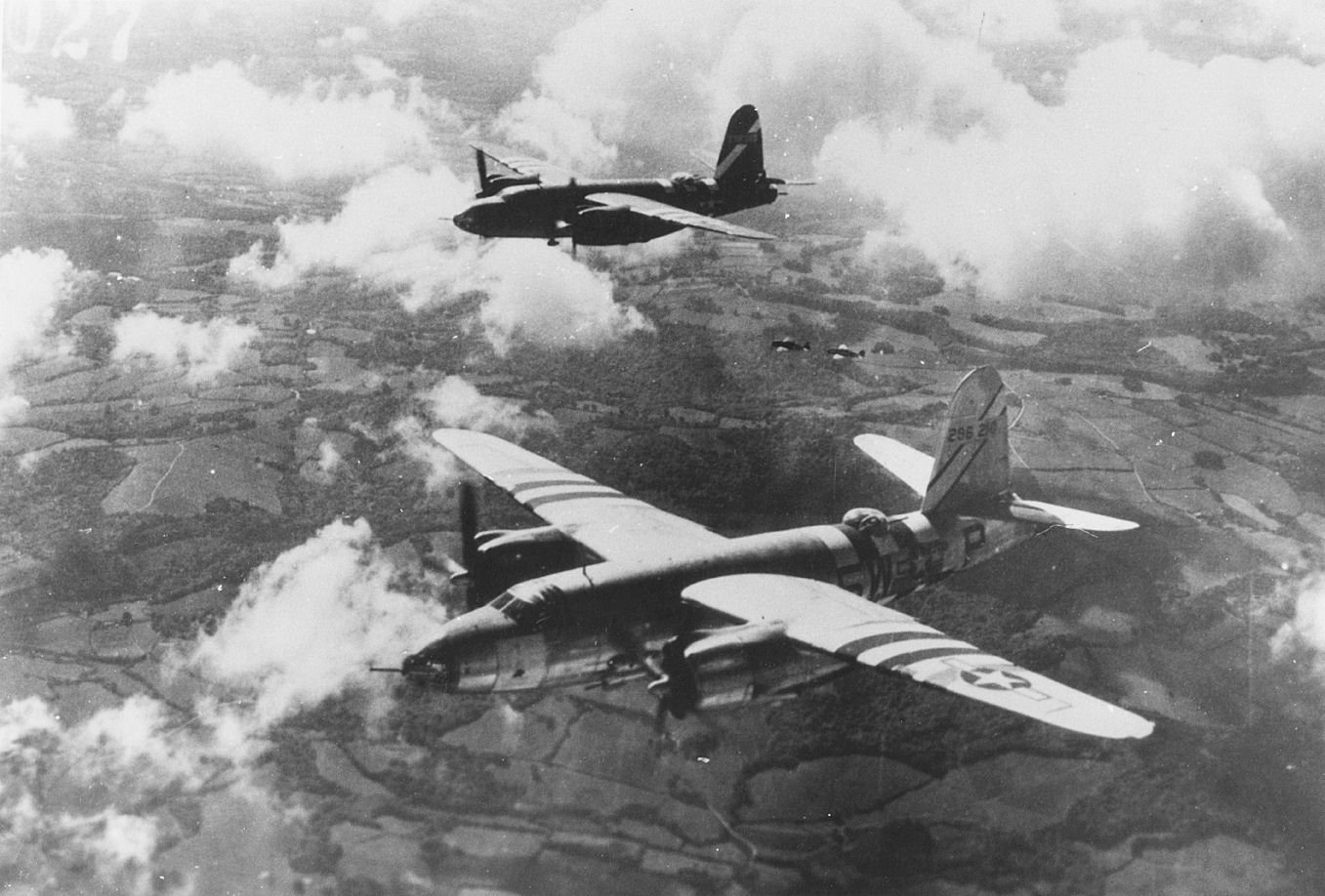
394th BG B-26s over France

As part of the Ninth Air Force the 394th Bomb Group was deployed to RAF Boreham, England, on March 11, 1944, and immediately participated in the bombing of bridges, airfields and the rail system in France in preparation for the cross-channel invasion. On D-Day, the group attacked gun positions in Cherbourg, then continued to support Allied ground units in Normandy by attacking German lines of communication. In late July, the group changed bases to RAF Holmsley South in preparation for a move to the continent, and on August 7, 1944, began a three-day campaign against rail and bridge targets in the Île-de-France region of northern France for which the group as a whole received a Distinguished Unit Citation.

=== Medal of Honor action ===
On August 9, Captain Lindsey, a veteran of 45 combat missions, flew as group leader to destroy the railroad bridge over the Seine River at L'Isle Adam northwest of Paris. The bridge, one of the last over the Seine still standing, was heavily defended by German anti-aircraft units.

Leading a formation of 30 aircraft, Lindsey's B-26 was heavily damaged and both the right engine and wing set afire during the bombing run. Although knocked out of formation, Lindsey recovered his place and led the group over the target, then stabilized the aircraft so that his crew could parachute. According to the crew's bombardier, Lindsey severely lessened his own chance to escape to prevent the aircraft from spinning, which proved fatal when a fuel tank exploded just after the last crewman exited the aircraft. Captain Lindsey's body was not recovered and he was listed as missing-in-action and presumed killed.

On May 30, 1945, Lindsey was awarded the Medal of Honor, accepted by his widow, Evalyn Scott Lindsey Rhinehart (1919–1992) during an August 9, 1945, ceremony at First Presbyterian Church in Fort Dodge.

== Medal of Honor citation ==
=== Medal of Honor citation ===
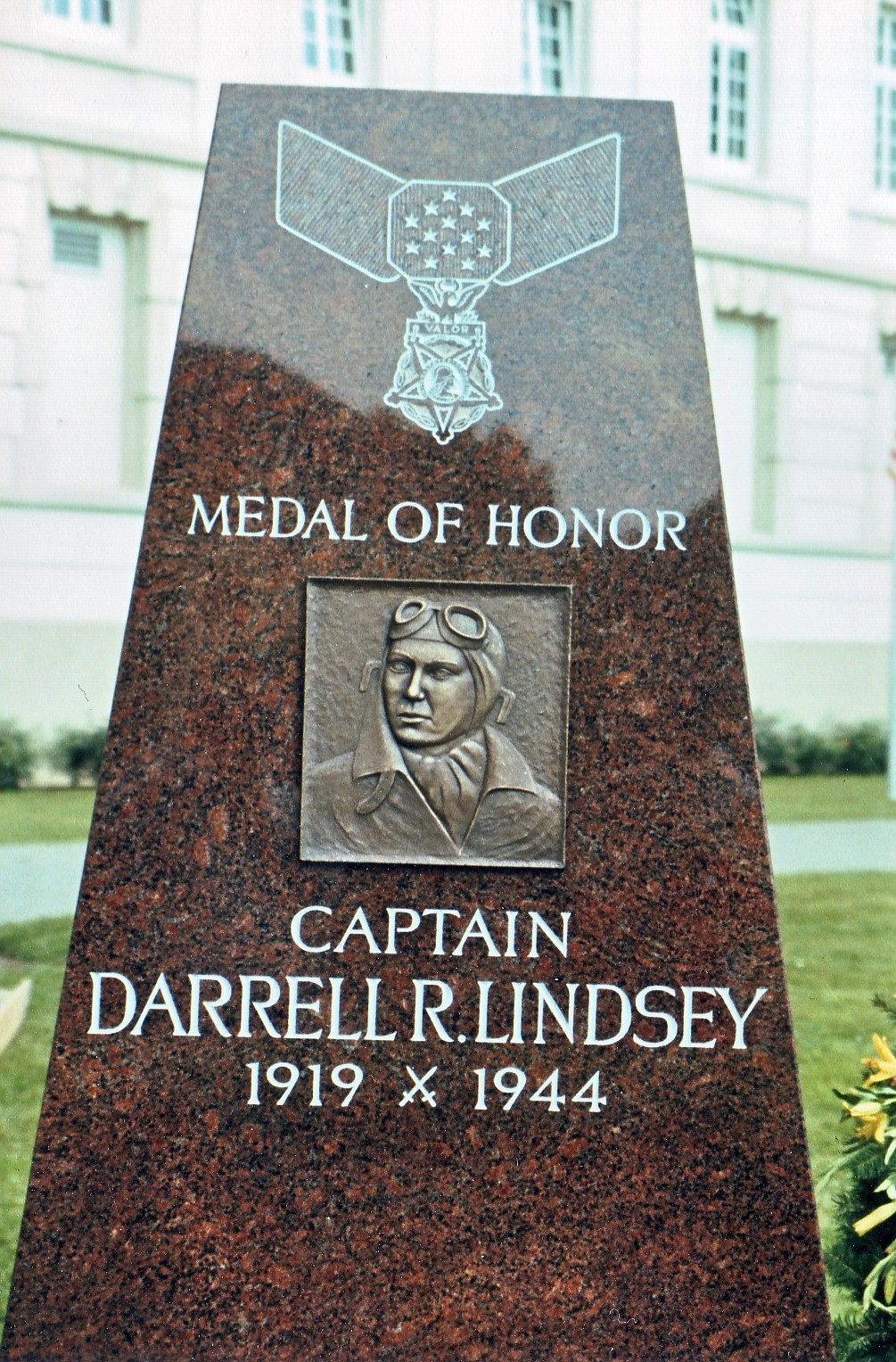
Medal of Honor memorial for Captain Darrell R. Lindsey, formerly at Lindsey Air Station in Wiesbaden, Germany. Now at Greene County Courthouse in Jefferson, Iowa.

On August 9, 1944, Capt. Lindsey led a formation of 30 B-26 medium bombers in a hazardous mission to destroy the strategic enemy held L'Isle Adam railroad bridge over the Seine in occupied France. With most of the bridges over the Seine destroyed, the heavily fortified L'Isle Adam bridge was of inestimable value to the enemy in moving troops, supplies, and equipment to Paris. Capt. Lindsey was fully aware of the fierce resistance that would be encountered. Shortly after reaching enemy territory the formation was buffeted with heavy and accurate antiaircraft fire. By skillful evasive action, Capt. Lindsey was able to elude much of the enemy flak, but just before entering the bombing run his B-26 was peppered with holes. During the bombing run the enemy fire was even more intense, and Capt. Lindsey's right engine received a direct hit and burst into flames. Despite the fact that his ship was hurled out of formation by the violence of the concussion, Capt. Lindsey brilliantly maneuvered back into the lead position without disrupting the flight. Fully aware that the gasoline tanks might explode at any moment, Capt. Lindsey gallantly elected to continue the perilous bombing run. With fire streaming from his right engine and his right wing half enveloped in flames, he led his formation over the target upon which the bombs were dropped with telling effect. Immediately after the objective was attacked, Capt. Lindsey gave the order for the crew to parachute from the doomed aircraft. With magnificent coolness and superb piloting, and without regard for his own life, he held the swiftly descending airplane in a steady glide until the members of the crew could jump to safety. With the right wing completely enveloped in flames and an explosion of the gasoline tank imminent, Capt. Lindsey still remained unperturbed. The last man to leave the stricken plane was the bombardier, who offered to lower the wheels so that Capt. Lindsey might escape from the nose. Realizing that this might throw the aircraft into an uncontrollable spin and jeopardize the bombardier's chances to escape, Capt. Lindsey refused the offer. Immediately after the bombardier had bailed out, and before Capt. Lindsey was able to follow, the right gasoline tank exploded. The aircraft sheathed in fire, went into a steep dive and was seen to explode as it crashed. All who are living today from this plane owe their lives to the fact that Capt. Lindsey remained cool and showed supreme courage in this emergency.

== Other honors ==
In November 1946, Lindsey Air Station, Wiesbaden Air Base, Germany, was named in his memory and served as the location of the Headquarters for the United States Air Forces in Europe. The station closed in 1993 and a red granite monument there was returned to Jefferson, Iowa, and placed on the lawn of the Greene County Courthouse, where it was dedicated to Lindsey on June 12, 1993.

On the following day at Lindsey's alma mater, Buena Vista University, another memorial was dedicated to Lindsey and Ralph Neppel, also a recipient of the Medal of Honor who had attended Buena Vista. The memorial was donated by Judge Charles Pendleton, a BVU alumnus. Judge Pendleton had earlier made a donation in the memory of Evalyn Rhinehart, who had recently died (August 17, 1992) in a motor vehicle accident, and the wife of a fellow alumnus, Dr. Bruce L. Rhinehart (1922–2010). Pendleton learned that she had been the widow of Darrell Lindsey, and that Lindsey's monument was being returned from Germany. Together, Pendleton and Rhinehart also began the Lindsey-Neppel Scholarship at Buena Vista in 1993.

== Awards and decorations ==

Badge	Army Air Forces Pilot Badge		
1st row	Medal of Honor	Purple Heart	Air Medal with eight oak leaf clusters
2nd row	American Campaign Medal	European–African–Middle Eastern Campaign Medal with three campaign stars	World War II Victory Medal
Unit awards	Presidential Unit Citation		

== See also ==
- List of Medal of Honor recipients
