= 587th Bombardment Squadron =

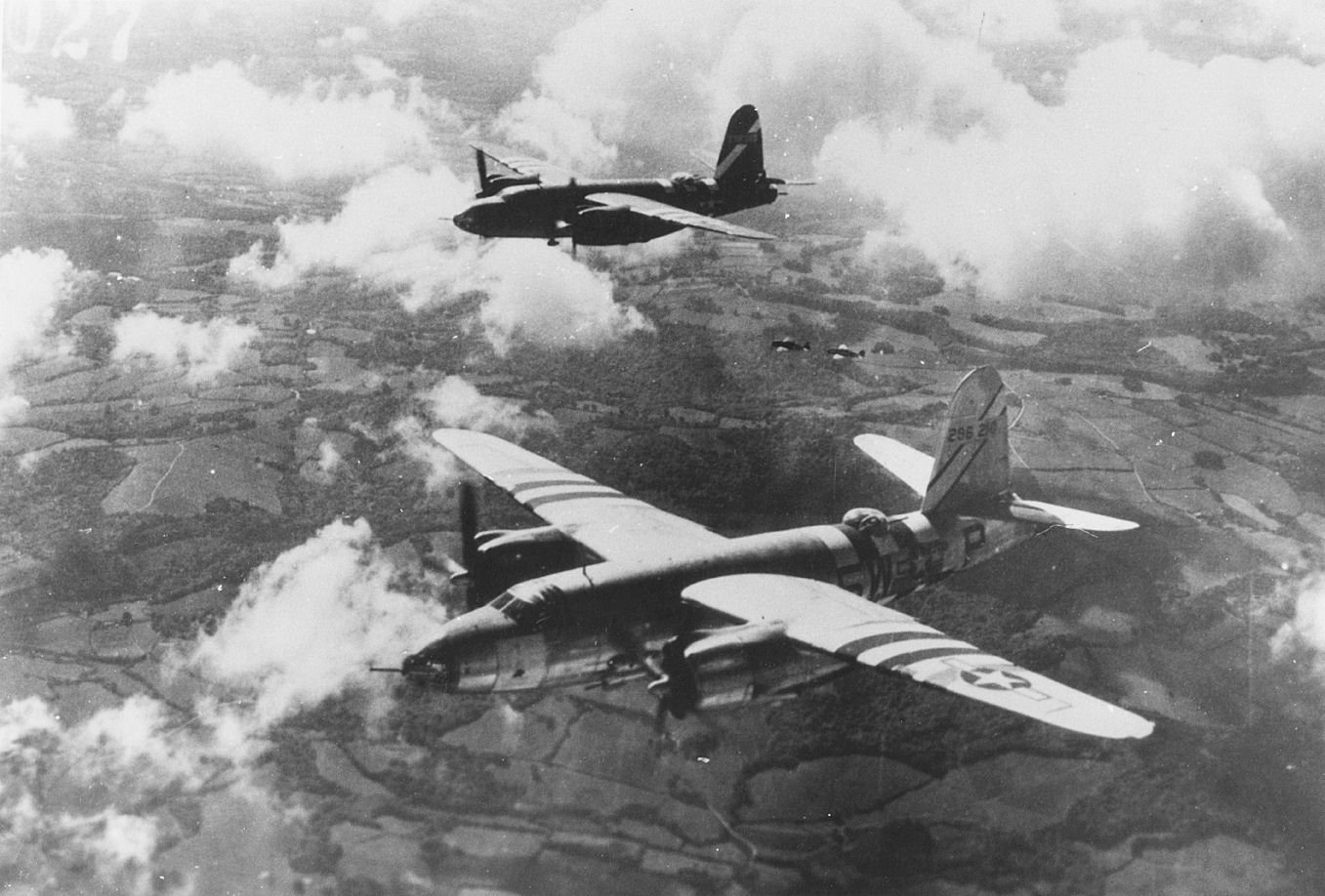
- 587th Bombardment Squadron Martin B-26 Marauders over France (Note: The aircraft in the foreground is Martin B-26B-55-MA, serial 42-96210, fuselage code 5W-P. this plane was shot down near Orleans/Bricy Airfield on 14 June 1944. Baugher, Joe (28 April 2023). "1942 USAF Serial Numbers". Joe Baugher. Missing Air Crew Report 6194.)
- Active: 1943–1945
- Country: United States
- Branch: United States Air Force
- Role: Medium bomber
- Engagements: European Theater of Operations
- Decorations: Distinguished Unit Citation; French Croix de Guerre with Palm

Insignia
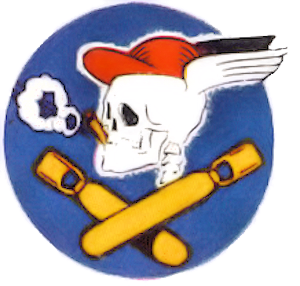
- 587th Bombardment Squadron emblem (Note: Approved 26 October 1943. Description: Over and through a medium blue disc, a white winged death's head proper, wearing a red fatigue cap, smoking a cigar fired proper, and blowing white smoke rings, all above two light tan aerial bombs in saltire in base.)
- Fuselage code: 5W

The 587th Bombardment Squadron is an inactive United States Air Force unit that was assigned to the 394th Bombardment Group. It was a Martin B-26 Marauder unit that was organized and trained in the United States during World War II. It flew combat missions in the European Theater of Operations, where it earned a Distinguished Unit Citation and a French Croix de Guerre with Palm. After V-E Day, it served with the occupation forces in Germany until inactivating on 28 December 1945 as the 394th Group converted to Douglas A-26 Invaders.

== History ==
=== Training in the United States ===
The 587th Bombardment Squadron was activated at MacDill Field, Florida as one of the original four squadrons of the 394th Bombardment Group. It began to train with the Martin B-26 Marauder, performing most of its training at Kellogg Field, Michigan. It departed for the European Theater of Operations (ETO) in mid-February 1944.

=== Combat in Europe ===
The squadron was established at RAF Boreham, which was to be its station until after D-Day, in mid March, and flew its first combat mission on 23 March, less than two weeks after its arrival in the ETO. It helped prepare for the invasion of Normandy by participating in Operation Crossbow, striking V-1 flying bomb and V-2 rocket launch sites. It also carried out attacks on marshalling yards, bridges, gun emplacements and airfields. Not all targets were near the intended invasion landing areas. For example, in April, the squadron participated in a heavy attack on the marshalling yard at Mechlen, Belgium. Later that month, it encountered particularly heavy flak in an attack on Heuringhem, in which the airplane leading the group formation received 264 holes. However, bombing results were not as accurate as desired, and the squadron was removed from operations for a week for additional training. On D-Day it attacked gun emplacements at Cherbourg, afterwards striking lines of communications, fuel storage sites and enemy strong points.

The squadron moved to RAF Holmsley South on 24 July, in a general move by the units of the 98th Bombardment Wing to bases closer to the invasion area, and on the following day supported Operation Cobra, the breakout at Saint Lo. Between 7 and 9 August, the squadron made five attacks on strongly defended targets in northern France. This operation resulted in the award of the Distinguished Unit Citation to the squadron. Later that month, the squadron moved to its first base on the continent, Tour-en-Bessin Airfield, in France. From this base, the 587th attacked strong points at Brest, France and later began attacking targets in Germany from its bases on the continent. During the Battle of the Bulge, the squadron attacked lines of communications to prevent reinforcements from reaching the attacking German forces. it participated in Operation Clarion, intended to destroy the remaining elements of the German transportation system. In addition to attacking transportation and storage facilities, toward the end of the war, the squadron dropped propaganda leaflets over occupied territory, which included the squadron's last combat mission.

=== Occupation and inactivation ===
Following V-E Day, the squadron moved to Kitzingen Airfield, Germany, where it became part of the Army of Occupation. In December, the 394th Group began to transition into the Douglas A-26 Invader. However, it also reduced its component squadrons from four to three and the 397th was inactivated in late December 1945.

== Lineage ==
- Constituted as the 587th Bombardment Squadron (Medium) on 15 February 1943

Activated on 5 March 1943
Redesignated 587th Bombardment Squadron, Medium on 9 October 1944
Redesignated 587th Bombardment Squadron, Light on 28 February 1946
Inactivated on 28 December 1945

=== Assignments ===
- 394th Bombardment Group, 5 March 1943 – 28 December 1945

=== Stations ===
- MacDill Field, Florida, 5 March 1943
- Ardmore Army Air Field, Oklahoma, 12 July 1943
- Kellogg Field, Michigan, 23 August 1943 – 15 February 1944
- RAF Boreham (AAF-161), England, 11 March 1944
- RAF Holmsley South (AAF-455), England, 28 July 1944
- Tour-en-Bessin Airfield (A-13), France, 31 August 1944
- Orleans-Bricy Airfield (A-50), France, 25 September 1944
- Cambrai/Niergnies Airfield (A-74), France, 12 October 1944
- Venlo Airfield (Y-55), Netherlands, 7 May 1945
- AAF Station Kitzingen (R-6), Germany, c. 21 September 1945 – 28 December 1945

=== Aircraft ===
- Martin B-26 Marauder, 1943–1945
- Douglas A-26 Invader, 1945

=== Awards and campaigns ===
Award streamer	Award	Dates	Notes
	Distinguished Unit Citation	7–9 August 1944	France, 587th Bombardment Squadron
	French Croix de Guerre with Palm	6 June – 14 September 1944	587th Bombardment Squadron

Campaign Streamer	Campaign	Dates	Notes
	Air Offensive, Europe	11 March 1944 – 5 June 1944	587th Bombardment Squadron
	Normandy	6 June 1944 – 24 July 1944	587th Bombardment Squadron
	Northern France	25 July 1944 – 14 September 1944	587th Bombardment Squadron
	Rhineland	15 September 1944 – 21 March 1945	587th Bombardment Squadron
	Ardennes-Alsace	16 December 1944 – 25 January 1945	587th Bombardment Squadron
	Central Europe	22 March 1944 – 21 May 1945	587th Bombardment Squadron
