= W. Dean Eastman =

American educator

Weston Dean Eastman (February 22, 1948 - March 13, 2025) was a nationally known educator and writer who instituted numerous innovative "hands-on" classroom teaching approaches and helped initiate a number of collaborations between numerous historical archives and public schools.

Eastman received many awards and honors during his long career.

== Recognition ==
The National Junior Chamber of Commerce selected Eastman as one of the Outstanding Young Men of America in 1982. From 1987 to 1991 Eastman served as grant reader/evaluator for the Commission of the Bicentennial of the United States Constitution, chaired by former Chief Justice Warren Burger. In 1989 he was selected as the John F. Kennedy Presidential Award Winner, "Outstanding Teacher on the Theme of the American Presidency" and as the Massachusetts Christa McAuliffe Fellow in 1990. Eastman was featured in the book I Am a Teacher by David Marquis (Simon & Schuster). In 1991, he was selected by the Disney Channel as one of 36 teachers in the nation to receive the American Teacher Award. He was featured on the Disney Channel on November 24, 1991. In 1991 Eastman was featured on NBC's Today Show for his work with homeless students, and was introduced on NBC's The Tonight Show with Jay Leno. He also appeared twice as a guest on Tom Bergeron's WBZ TV Show "People Are Talking". He served as a grant reader/evaluator for the United States Department of Education from 1992 to 1994. In 1992 he helped develop, research, and host a ten-part series on immigration for Massachusetts Educational Television (MCET). In 1996, Eastman's local history class was featured in an article "History Close to Home" in the fall 1996 issue of Teaching Tolerance, published by the Southern Poverty Law Center.

In 2001 Eastman was featured in the PBS series "Only A Teacher: The History of Teaching in the United States". In 2004 he was selected as the first annual Preserve America Massachusetts History Teacher of the Year. In 2005 the National Park Service awarded him the Prince Saunders Education Award for Exemplary Contribution in the Field of African-American Historical Research.

In 2005 Eastman appeared as a contestant on ABC's Who Wants to Be a Millionaire as part of a special tribute to America's teachers.

Eastman was a recipient of Harvard University's Derek Bok Prize for Public Service.

Eastman was the recipient of the Drake University Alumni Achievement Award in 1991, and Drake's School of Education's Outstanding Alumni Award in 1994. He was a visiting professor of education at Drake from 1994 to 1995, and was a guest lecturer in 2005 and 2010. He was profiled in Drake Blue (Winter 2005).

Of Eastman, Pulitzer Award winner in American History Bernard Bailyn stated "I have never seen creative imagination so wonderfully at work in high school teaching"

Eastman was selected for both Marquis Who's Who in America and Who's Who in the World for almost 20 years.

He is an elected fellow at both the Massachusetts Historical Society and Colonial Society of Massachusetts, and served an eight-year term as one of eight members of Adams Family Papers Administration Committee from 2005 to 2013. He also served on the boards of the Public Broadcasting System (PBS), the National Teacher Source Advisory Group from 2004 to 2005, and the Massachusetts Civil Liberties Union Education Steering Committee from 1990 to 2010.

In 2017 Eastman received the Nelson Marquis Who's Who Lifetime Achievement Award.

Eastman is the co-creator of primaryresearch.org, which was founded in 1999 to highlight and benefit the endeavor of local history study among public school students.

In 2019 Eastman received the James E Stewart Torch Bearer Award, presented by the Montford Point Marines of America Association, for humanitarian service and historical research and writing in the field of African-American history.

== Life and education ==
Eastman was born in Lawrence, Massachusetts on February 22, 1948, the son of Weston D. and Harriet Eastman. Eastman attended the Andover, Massachusetts Public Schools and, while a student at Andover High School, was a member of the Latin Club, a library assistant, won third place in the science fair, and won 8 athletic letters in football, indoor track, and outdoor track. In his senior year, Andover High won the Massachusetts All-Class Track and Field Championship. Eastman placed in the 200-meter dash and was a member of the 800-meter relay team that placed second. His classmates at Andover High included Tonight Show host Jay Leno and Emmy Award-winning soap opera writer Lorraine Broderick.

Eastman attended Drake University from 1966 to 1970. He was a member of the Bulldog Track team as a freshman. Eastman graduated from Drake in 1970 with a BSE in Social Science. He was the recipient of the 1991 Drake University Alumni Achievement Award and the 1994 Drake University School of Education Outstanding Achievement Award.

Eastman received an MSE and Certificate of Advanced Graduate Study at Springfield College (1976, 1977).

In 2000 he received an ALM degree with a concentration in Government from Harvard University. Under the guidance of thesis advisor, Stephan Thernstrom, a recipient of the Bancroft Prize in American History, Dean's topic was "The Influence of Immigration on the Development of Civic Education in the United States from 1880-1925".

Eastman was selected for Who's Who in the World and Who's Who in America in every year from 2000 to 2015. He received a Lifetime Achievement Award by Marquis Who's Who in 2017. In 2018 Eastman was awarded the Albert Nelson Marquis Who's Who Lifetime Achievement Award.

Eastman died on March 13, 2025, in Vero Beach, Florida, after a battle with cancer.

== Teaching career ==
Eastman started teaching in the Beverly, Massachusetts Public Schools upon graduation from Drake University in 1970. He taught social studies at Memorial Junior High School and at Beverly High School. He retired from teaching in 2006.

=== Coaching ===
In addition to teaching, Eastman was a successful track coach. From 1970 to 1981 he coached at Beverly High School, Springfield College, Salem State College and the University of Massachusetts Lowell. While at Springfield College from 1974 to 1976 he was a Graduate-Assistant Track and Field coach under legendary coach Vern Cox. From 1975 to 1980 he coached eight Division II NCAA Track and Field All-Americans. From 1980 to 1983 Eastman served as Goodwill Ambassador for the United States Department of State, coaching Track and Field in Mexico.

Eastman coached track and field for fourteen years on a number of levels, including high school, college, and internationally. Early in his coaching career, he was fortunate to come under the tutelage of Fred Wilt, an Olympic runner, Sullivan Award winner and a respected coach. From 1970 to 1981, in conjunction with teaching, Eastman coached at Beverly High School, Springfield College, Salem State College, and the University of Massachusetts at Lowell. While at Springfield College (1974–1976) he was a Graduate-Assistant Track and Field Coach under coach Vern Cox. From 1975 to 1980, Eastman coached eight Division II NCAA Track and Field All-Americans. During the summers from 1980 to 1983, he served as Goodwill Ambassador for the United States Department of State, coaching Track and Field in Mexico.

Eastman had a number of coaching opportunities that he was unable to accept due to family health responsibilities. These opportunities included an offer by the Nigerian Government in 1974 for a two-year contract to serve as Head Track and Field Coach that included the 1976 Olympic Coach position. In 1978, Eastman was offered the position of National Track and Field Coach for Upper Volta (now Burkina Faso). In 1982, the Nation of Cuba invited Eastman to conduct a number of coaching clinics in Cuba.

Amongst numerous clinical and workshop presentations, Eastman was published in a number of track and field-related journals, including Scholastic Coach, Track Technique, and The Journal of Physical Education and Recreation.

=== Beverly High School ===
In the 1980s, Eastman and Beverly Social Studies Coordinator Anthony Witwicki shared a vision of a social studies lab: a room set up on the same principles as a science or language lab, and a place where students could get hands-on training. A stipend of $15,000 that Eastman received as a recipient of the Massachusetts Christa McAuliffe Fellowship helped bring to fruition the social studies lab vision he shared with Witwicki.

With the help of archaeologist Steven Pendery, Eastman created an interdisciplinary Archaeology course that included a first-of-its-kind 20x15 foot field training "sand box" with 3,000 artifacts buried in four levels representing periods in American history - late Woodland, Colonial, Victorian, and Modern-Day. The course included a classroom laboratory for artifact analysis and cataloging.

The program also included a four-week summer program for special needs students.

Due to school budget limitations, Eastman and his students created their own textbook for both Archaeology and Architecture.

In the days before wide-use of the Internet and its later manifestations of blogs, podcasts, and social media, Eastman attempted to connect students to the broader world of scholarship through cutting-edge technologies available at the time. He initiated a national social studies video exchange where High School Social Studies classes created videos featuring the local histories of their community. One of Eastman's classes composed a 20-minute video on Boston's Freedom Trail. Other videos produced by his students included ones on The Alamo, The Second Great Awakening, and the Chicago Stockyards. This exchange provided student-created videos to participating schools for free.

Eastman initiated a Community Outreach Genealogical Service where his students volunteered to interview and videotape multi-generational families about their memories, including pictures and documents, at no cost to the families. One copy was given to the participating family, and the other became part of a Beverly Genealogical Video Archive.

He established a teacher job bank for summer employment in collaboration with the Beverly business community. It connected physical education teachers with summer job opportunities as fitness instructors, business teachers with various corporations, and science and math teachers with technical employers. Teachers had opportunities to try new endeavors like flower arranging or work in art galleries.

Eastman created a colonial gravestone research program called "Tiptoeing Through the Tombstones". Students were given opportunities to research and analyze the evolution of New England gravestone symbols (such as ‘death heads’, ‘cherubs’, and ‘urn and willow’). They studied inscriptions, borders, finials, and styles popular in New England from approximately 1680 to 1820. For each colonial cemetery they visited, students filled out seriation charts to document the rise and fall in prevalence of various gravestone styles and types of inscriptions. Students considered whether and how these changes reflected shifts in Puritan religious beliefs.

Students were also asked to carefully analyze gravestone art for evidence of the distinct styles of individual gravestone carvers. Although carvers did not leave initials, students came up with a way to identify them, by making lists of stones that exhibited similar designs, along with the name of the deceased and year of death. They were then able to find (in many cases) the names of carvers in wills left on file at the Massachusetts State Archives, as often there were bills listed by the executor of payment to a particular gravestone carver.

Eastman taught how to use architecture as a vehicle to study the evolution of urban development. He created an Architectural Handbook of the architectural styles of residential buildings and the time period in which these styles were most popular. As innovations in transportation advanced (such as trains, streetcars and the automobile), residential and entrepreneurial development expanded farther away from the central city, usually in bands of concentric development. The Architecture Handbook allowed students, as they walked city streets that intersect these residential concentric circles, to date the expansion of the city through these changes in architectural styles.

Eastman led students in the creation of "The Greek Revival Architecture of the American One-Room School as a Symbolic Reflection of Our Democratic National Ideals". Based on research Eastman did while studying at Harvard, the project included a history of One-Room School Houses in Essex (MA) County and a photo survey of surviving one-room school buildings and their current uses.

Another area of Eastman's student-directed research was on the Genealogy of Houses in Old Neighborhoods. The objective of this research was to discover what kinds of businesses and craftsmen (coopers, blacksmiths, sailmakers, etc.) may have existed in particular neighborhoods over time. This would be of particular importance when a house, or number of houses, were planned to be knocked down and replaced. By knowing the various occupations taking place over time it may allow an opportunity for an archaeological test pit or two to locate artifacts and archaeological information before destruction. As part of their involvement in the project, students voluntarily visited the Registry of Deeds in Salem, MA and searched for titles of ownership for houses in various neighborhoods over the years. Once the chain of ownership was determined for each house, students linked census records, city directories, tax records, and others, to create individual biographies for individuals who occupied each house.

Eastman initiated a voluntary 70-minute history class that met at 6:00am every Wednesday to help students gain more expertise in the research and writing of American History. The class had unanimous attendance throughout the length of the course. This class, that encouraged students to become historians, was called "The Breakfast Club".

== Sagas in Stone ==
In 2004, Eastman developed this interdisciplinary project where students designed and built a stone wall. They created their own colonial measuring device, called the "Gunther chain", using measurement units (called ‘chains’ or ‘perches’). Construction of the stone wall began in September and was completed during the Christmas school vacation with all of the students volunteering during every cold week.

In addition to gaining building skills, students learned to determine if stone walls from the colonial era were used to keep animals in or out (from eating crops, for example). This was accomplished by examining the type of second growth of flora surrounding the wall. Students then created a chart that identified particular types of original agricultural use by following hints left in the succession of post-abandonment plant life. For example, white pine is typically found on land previously used as pasture.

Students also learned to date stone walls using lichenometry, a method that measures lichen growth. To double-check the accuracy of the dating method, students measured lichen on the back of colonial gravestones and then checked their estimate against the year of death on the front. Stone wall dating using lichenometry proved accurate within twenty years.

Students wrote research papers on a number of related topics, including:

- Stone Walls in American Literature and Imagination,
- Flora Surrounding Stone Walls,
- A Study of Lichens and Lichenometry,
- Landscape History of Beverly, Massachusetts,
- Role of Stone Walls in New England Agriculture, and
- The Geology of Colonial New England Stone Walls .

== Nathan Dane Collaboration Project ==
Nathan Dane (1752–1835) was an important figure in the history of Beverly, MA, as well as in the emerging nation. Dane was a Massachusetts delegate to Congress during the time of the Articles of Confederation and was the architect of the Northwest Ordinance of 1787. He was a member of the Massachusetts House of Representatives, a member of the Hartford Convention during the War of 1812, and a founder of the Massachusetts Temperance Society. He also wrote a set of law texts, the proceeds of which established the first endowed chair at Harvard Law School.

There are a number of archival resources related to Dane at both the Massachusetts Historical Society and the Beverly Historical Society. The Dane papers at the BHS were, due to budgetary challenges at the time, neither well preserved or cataloged.

The Dane Collaborative Project was initially an archival preservation project, via digitization, at the Beverly Historical Society. A student, Marc Mahan, volunteered over 150 hours photocopying and digitizing over 100 Dane manuscripts held there. Over 50 of Dane's manuscripts were transcribed as part of the digitization process. Eastman's two government classes unanimously volunteered to help.

These digitized Dane manuscripts were now ready to connect with those at the Massachusetts Historical Society. Eastman's students spent hours at the MHS studying more about Dane's life. They eventually produced original research papers on various aspects of Dane's life, integrating both collections.

== Antebellum Boston African-American Civic Engagement Project ==
This project, led by Eastman, Kevin McGrath and Tom Scully, engaged students in learning about the civic engagement of Boston's Antebellum African-Americans through their participation in a number of voluntary associations. Many of these, such as the Boston Vigilance Committee, the Freedom Association, and the Anti-Man Hunting League, were abolitionist groups actively involved in the Underground Railroad. Other voluntary associations focused on literary endeavors, temperance, prison reform, etc.

Central to the success of the project was close collaboration with libraries, museums, and archives including the Boston Athenaeum, the Massachusetts Historical Society, the Boston African-American Historic Site, and the Beverly Public Library.

As part of their participation in the project, students created a database of about 1900 African-Americans living on Beacon Hill's lower slope from 1835 to 1855. The demographic information concerning these individuals was compiled by cross-referencing data from Boston City Directories, U.S. Census Records and Boston Poll Tax records. This database was paramount in linking their names with hundreds mentioned in articles in the abolitionist newspaper The Liberator on Boston's voluntary associations. These were digitized and indexed as an aid to our research into the civic engagement of African-Americans living in that neighborhood.

In addition, students adapted an 1852 map of Boston's Beacon Hill to GIS format. They were now able to connect names in the database with parcel ID's from Boston Tax Assessment records. Now by clicking on a particular building on the modern-day map, one can view the biographical data of who was living there in 1850.

== Social History of Postcards ==
This student project examined various aspects of postcard creation and use in the first half of the 20th century. The project availed students the opportunity to research, analyze, digitize and write about the social history of postcards. Student research focused on topics such as ‘the uses of postcards’, ‘civic postcards’, ‘landscape postcards’, ‘business postcards’, ‘house postcards’, ‘church postcards’, ‘uses of colorization’, ‘postcard publishers’, ‘what’s written on the back’, ‘the dynamics of Beverly postcards’, and ‘lost Beverly’. Students also created their own modern-day postcards of Beverly.

== Project Apprentice to History ==
The goal of Project Apprentice to History (PATH) was to inspire in high school students a love of history through the investigation of primary sources. It was formed as a collaborative project involving the Beverly Public Library and a number of greater-Boston's finest archival repositories and libraries.

This voluntary student program was designed and administered by Eastman, Beverly High School Librarian Kevin McGrath, and Beverly Public Library Director Tom Scully. The class was conducted on Wednesdays and on Saturdays at research institutions including the Massachusetts Historical Society, the Boston Athenaeum, Harvard School of Education's Gutman Library, and the Massachusetts State Archives.

One of the principal objectives of PATH was to determine how, what, and why historians do what they do, to bridge the distance between students, teachers, scholars and research institutions. The Saturday field trips availed students the opportunity to interact and career-shadow a variety of professionals in the field of history, including scholars, archivists, research librarians, and museum directors. Students also learned through hands-on activities the various formats by which archival documents are cataloged, preserved, described and interpreted.

PATH I, in the Spring of 2000, focused on the "history of the history" of the Boston Massacre, including the analysis of first-hand accounts, newspapers, diaries, court documents, Paul Revere's original metal etching of the event, an interview with Hiller Zobel (noted judge and author of a book on the Boston Massacre), and the incremental examination of American History textbooks’ coverage of the event during each decade from 1810 to 1980. Students visited the Boston Athenaeum, the Massachusetts Historical Society, the Massachusetts State Archives, and the Harvard School of Education's Gutman Library's Special Collections.

In subsequent years PATH switched focus to other historical topics:

- PATH II (Spring 2001): Maritime History
- PATH III (Spring 2002): Church Records
- PATH IV (Spring 2004): African-Americans in Antebellum Boston

== Beverly Educational Archives ==
In 2001, Eastman and Kevin McGrath established the Beverly Educational Archives. The archives contained education documents dating from 1763 to the present. Records collected in the archives include yearbooks, student publications, school committee reports, municipal documents, census records, city directories, letters, photographs, meeting minutes, microfilmed newspapers, and more. The purpose of the Beverly Educational Archives is to appraise, collect, organize, describe, preserve, and make accessible records of permanent administrative, legal, fiscal and historical value to Beverly High School, Beverly Public Schools and the City of Beverly.

The formation of the Archives was a collaborative effort, starting with a financial gift from the Beverly High School Class of 1994 (led by Meredith Haviland) and the generous assistance of masonry students from North Shore Regional Vocational High School led by teachers Mac Seaver and David Collins, who helped construct the room for the Archives.

In the spring of 2002, Kevin McGrath applied for, and received, a Preservation Grant from the Northeast Massachusetts Regional Library System. This grant paid for the services of Margaret Cornell, a professional Archivist, who did a complete survey and helped organize and describe the collection.

Many of the materials from the Archives have been digitized and are available online. Online exhibits include ones on Student Groups and Clubs, the Beverly School District, Student Publications, Beverly Trade Schools, Class Pictures, and Athletics.

Both Eastman and McGrath taught classes that led students through the process of conducting primary research on the social history of Beverly Public Schools.

== Primaryresearch.org ==
Primaryresearch.org was founded by Eastman and McGrath in 1999. The website was initially funded by a Documentary Heritage Grant from the Massachusetts Historical Records Advisory Board.

The objective behind its creation was to link students and professional scholars of history around local historical topics. Beverly High School students visited archives, libraries, and museums to collect and link primary source materials on selected topics, to demonstrate that history comes alive through hands-on investigation.

The website has grown to include a diverse array of projects on topics such as Puritan gravestones, Nathan Dane, African-Americans in Antebellum Boston, and much more. An annotated bibliography of student research, linking many of the original papers, is offered.

The site serves the research community by providing free access to original source documents and databases, as well as primary research by Beverly High School students. Collections of local history documents such as the Beverly Educational Archives, and Historic Postcards of Beverly, are presented free of charge.

== The Eighteenth-Century Records of the Boston Overseers of the Poor ==
In 2007, The Eighteenth-Century Records of the Boston Overseers of the Poor was published by the Colonial Society of Massachusetts. Edited by Eric G. Nellis and Anne Decker, it is based on manuscript records of the Boston Overseers of the Poor which the Massachusetts Historical Society obtained from the City of Boston in 1957.

The Colonial Society asked Eastman and McGrath to create a vehicle that would make the content of the book of interest for high school students and spark student investigations.

Eastman and McGrath created a web-based project on digitized key areas of the Boston Overseers of the Poor records. It includes student workbook questions for each of the components. They converted the records into a searchable database including over 1100 children who were ‘bound out’ (apprenticed) from 1756 to 1806, including names, ages, gender, town, master/mistress, and trade. An interactive map includes the adopted locations of the children in Massachusetts and Maine (which was part of Massachusetts until 1820).

Other components include:

- Various legislative acts regarding the poor,
- A list of all Boston Overseers of the Poor from 1690 to 1800,
- Digitized child indenture contracts,
- A 1756 almshouse census and inventory,
- A searchable database of "Black, Mulatto and Foreign-Born Poorhouse Admissions: 1775-1800", and
- A searchable database of Almshouse admissions from November 1758 to September 1788.

== Publications ==
=== Books or contributions to books ===
- Eastman, Weston D. (2017). Strictly Scuttlebutt: From Ivy Halls to Duty Calls. CreateSpace Independent Publishing Platform. ISBN 978-1536824308.
- Eastman, W. Dean; McGrath, Kevin (2009). "13 - Encouraging Civic Virtues: A Collaborative Model Developed by a Teacher-Librarian and a Classroom Teacher". School Library Media Programs in Action: Civic Engagement, Social Justice, and Equity. American Association of School Librarians. ISBN 978-0-8389-8515-1.
- "The Influence of Immigration on the Development of Civic Education in the United States from 1880-1925." Diss. Harvard University, 2000. Cambridge: Harvard University, 2000.
- "Nathan Dane." Yale Biographical Dictionary of American Law. Roger K. Newman, ed. New Haven: Yale University Press, 2009.
- Served as editor/reviewer for Glencoe World History: Modern Times (World History Textbook), 2001.

=== Articles ===
- Eastman, Dean; McGrath, Kevin (July 2006). "Sagas in Stone: Students re-create New England history". Common-place, The Interactive Journal of Early American Life. Vol. 6, no. 4.
- Eastman, W. Dean; McGrath, Kevin (April 2005). "These Names Had Life and Meaning: Students Document Antebellum African American Civic Engagement". Common-place: The Interactive Journal of Early American Life. Vol. 5, no. 3.
- Eastman, W. Dean; McGrath, Kevin G. (January 2003). "Portals to the Past". Common-place: The Interactive Journal of Early American Life. Vol. 3, no. 2.
- Eastman, W. Dean; McGrath, Kevin G. (January 2003). "Tiptoeing Through The Tombstones". Common-place: The Interactive Journal of Early American Life. Vol. 3, no. 2.
- Eastman, W. Dean (January 2000). "Primary research Through Local History at Beverly High School, Massachusetts". Local History Magazine 77. Vol. 12.
- Lepley, Paul M.; Eastman, W. Dean (1977). "Other Choices: Alternative Careers for Physical Educators". Journal of Physical Education and Recreation. 48 (1): 29. doi:10.1080/00971170.1977.10617560.
- "A Primary Research Approach to Local Civics." The Civic Perspective: the newsletter of the Institute on Writing, Reading and Civic Education, Harvard Graduate School of Education, Winter of 1989.
- "The Physiology of the Female Athlete," Track Technique, September, 1976.
- "Development of the High School Shot-putter," Scholastic Coach Magazine, September, 1975.
- "Promotion and Organization of the High School Track Program," Scholastic Coach Magazine. February, 1973.
