= Boreham Circuit =

Boreham Circuit is a disused motor racing circuit and airfield in Boreham, United Kingdom.

Originally RAF Boreham, with the facility released from military control, in 1946, the West Essex Car Club developed the 4.76 kilometre perimeter track for motor racing. Although not on the official Grand Prix calendar, Boreham Circuit hosted competitive races between 1949 and 1952. Among the teams that raced at Boreham were BRM, Connaught, Frazer Nash, and Talbot-Lago. Among the drivers who raced there were Mike Hawthorn, Stirling Moss, and Ken Wharton. In 1955 the Ford Motor Company bought the airfield to use as a test facility for trucks, as well as the base for their Competitions Department where they prepared their cars.

In the late 1970s Boreham Proving Ground was the test site for Ford Heavy Truck Development. The development engineers at nearby Ford Dunton worked out various test programmes, and the Test Engineers at Boreham carried these out and reported back the data. One common test was RLD, or 'Road Load Data', where a chassis would be fitted with various strain gauges, and the data from these recorded. This was the main test site for Ford Trucks, and the Ford Cargo, released in 1980, was extensively tested here against competitor trucks. There were many various surfaces at Boreham to drive the trucks on. "Rest of the World" road, was a fairly rigorous route, with smooth surfaces, some undulating surfaces and some pot-holes. "Korean Road" was full of pot-holes and considered to be the worst test for a truck. Test drivers were not very happy if they were allocated four days of driving "Korean Road" to gather RLD since they were bumped around in the cab constantly. Aside the main entrance to Boreham was a small unit that was Ford Rally Sport. They built the Ford rally cars of the late 1970s and early 1980s there.

On February 6, 1986, the first test drives of the new Cosworth designed and built Ford TEC turbocharged engine which would make its debut in that years Formula One season, took place at a bitterly cold (–6 °Celsius) and icy Boreham Proving Ground with Haas Lola team drivers, 1980 World Champion Alan Jones, and former factory Ferrari and Renault driver Patrick Tambay, giving the engine its first run in a race car (the V6 turbo engine had previously only run on Cosworth's dynamometer at its Northamptonshire factory).
