= Frank Wilhoit (composer) =

American Composer (1959-)

- Born: Francis Wilhoit; July 17, 1958 (age 68); Bethesda, Maryland, US
- Occupations: Software Engineer, composer
- Musical career
- Genre: Western classical music

Francis "Frank" Wilhoit (born July 17, 1958) is an American composer. Initially self-taught, he then studied composition at Catholic University of America (B.Mus., 1980), the University of Nebraska–Lincoln (M.Mus., 1983) and Ohio State University (Ph.D., incomplete, 1987).

Wilhoit and John Webber co-founded the Shoestring Orchestra (1979, subsequently the New Music Orchestra) to perform unfamiliar orchestral music of the 19th and 20th Centuries.

== Wilhoit's law ==
An excerpt from a comment Wilhoit wrote in 2018 on the political blog Crooked Timber has come to be known as "Wilhoit's Law".

Conservatism consists of exactly one proposition, to wit: There must be in-groups whom the law protects but does not bind, alongside out-groups whom the law binds but does not protect.

"Wilhoit's Law" is regularly misattributed to the political scientist Francis M. Wilhoit, who died in 2010.

Slate interviewed Frank Wilhoit in 2022 on his comment and the misattribution.

I’m not trying to claim credit for anything. I am a creative artist myself. If Francis Wilhoit had been an amateur composer and his music was being attributed to me? I mean it’s just an endless cascade of nightmares all the way down.

Others have pointed out the misattribution, including Jason Kottke in 2021.
