= Earl F. Martin =

American academic administrator

Earl F. "Marty" Martin III

13th President of Drake University
- Incumbent
- Assumed office July 1, 2015
- Preceded by: David Maxwell

Personal details
- Born: December 16, 1961 (age 64) Lexington, Kentucky, U.S.
- Spouse: Laura Martin
- Children: Franklin Cade Martin; Case Martin
- Education: University of Kentucky (BA, JD); Yale University (LLM)
- Occupation: President, Drake University
- Website: Drake University Office of the President

Earl F. "Marty" Martin III (born December 16, 1961) is the president of Drake University. The thirteenth president of Drake, he has served in that capacity since 2015; previously he served as executive vice president of Gonzaga University.

== Education ==
Martin has a Juris Doctor degree from University of Kentucky College of Law and an advanced law degree from Yale Law School. Following graduation from law school Martin worked for the United States Air Force's Judge Advocate General corps.

== Academic career ==
After his military service, Martin joined Texas Wesleyan University School of Law as a professor and later associate dean in 1997. Following eight years at Texas Wesleyan, he moved to Gonzaga, where he served as dean of the Gonzaga University School of Law before later ascending to executive vice president in 2010. He became President of Drake University in July 2015.

Preceded by David Maxwell	President of Drake University; July 1, 2015–present	Succeeded by Current
