= Gwen M. Davidson =

American painter and collage artist (born 1951)

- Born: Gwen Marie Davidson; 1951 (age 73–74); Owatonna, Minnesota
- Education: BFA in art, Drake University; MFA in painting, Portland State University, 1987
- Known for: Geometric abstractions referencing architectural spaces Explorations of natural world

Gwen Davidson (born 1951) is a painter who makes collage-style acrylic works on canvases covered with layered strips of paper.

== Early life and education ==
Born in Owatonna, Minnesota, in 1951, she is the daughter of Orlen Harry Davidson and Lorraine Mary (née Sammon) Davidson.

Davidson studied art in Florence, Italy. She earned a BFA in art at Drake University and an MFA in painting at Portland State University in 1987. Davidson married Douglas Lubotsky, architect, in 1989.

== Critical reception ==
Critics have described Davidson's art favorably. Helen Harrison wrote in The New York Times that Davidson's paintings "...rely on strong geometric frameworks for their architecture-based abstractions. Ms. Davidson's elegant compositions refer to beams, girders and other building supports, but these heavy, dark elements are softened by erasures and overpainting, and offset by areas of soft, translucent color."

Bob Hicks of Oregon ArtsWatch said, "Portland painter Davidson shows some deceptively placid-looking painted and collaged landscapes from the Oregon Coast. Look, and then look again."

David Carmack Lewis wrote, "She works initially with a combination of acrylic paint and charcoal on paper. The paper, in rectangular strips of varying proportions, are then applied to canvas. The method gives the work a rigid geometric framework but the organic nature of her subject not only survives but somehow thrives within it... Even her most abstract pieces unfailingly capture a genuine sense of place and atmosphere."

Another reviewer wrote that her art is characterized by:

...very particular, quiet, precise abstraction. Though Davidson employs no familiar shapes, her paintings are immediately readable as environments, texture and place reduced to overlaid horizontal strips of color. The brown and blue tones in "Winter" evoke bleached weeds against ice, the strip of slush along a highway, the weird light that bounces off snow. Davidson doesn't literally depict any of these things, and she doesn't need to. Her paintings merely set the right conditions for your own projection.

— Megan Burbank, The Portland Mercury

== Selected exhibitions ==
Davidson's works are in permanent collections of the Portland Art Museum, Nordstrom and the state of Oregon Collection, as well as corporate and public collections, including the cities of Seattle and Portland, King County Justice Center, the State Employment Building in Salem, Oregon, Intuit, Lucent, and Willamina Lumber Company.

Her exhibitions include:

- 2014 - Reflections, Froelick Gallery (Portland, Oregon)
- 2012 - Abstract Landscapes, Froelick Gallery
- 2009 - Coastal Landscapes, Froelick Gallery
- 2007 - Point of Reference, Froelick Gallery
- 2004 - Relative Values, Froelick Gallery
- 2003 - Recent Work, Davidson Galleries (Seattle, Washington)
- 2002 - Froelick Gallery
- 2001 - Gwen Davidson: Recent Work, Davidson Galleries
- 2001 - Paintings, Froelick Gallery
- 1999 - Froelick Adelhart Gallery (Portland, Oregon)
- 1996 - Big Drawings, Small Paintings, Portland Community College—Northview Gallery (Portland, Oregon)
- 1992 - Gallery 114 (Portland, Oregon)
- 1990 - Portland State University—Littman Gallery (Portland, Oregon)
- 1986 - Portland State University (thesis)—Gallery 299

== Awards and honors ==
Davidson's art was selected for inclusion in the Oregon Biennial in 2001.
