= Stanley Hess =

American artist and educator (1923–2019)

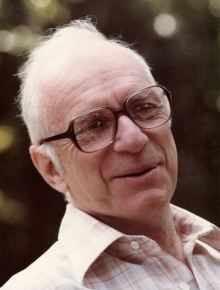
- Circa 1984
- Born: Stanley Otto Hess; July 8, 1923; Weatherford, Oklahoma
- Died: March 9, 2019 (aged 95); Tulsa, Oklahoma
- Education: University of Oklahoma
- Occupations: Professor of Art, Drake University
- Known for: Murals, studio paintings, musical instruments

Stanley Otto Hess (1923–2019) was an American artist and educator active in Oklahoma and Iowa. He is best known for his paintings, which often featured double images, and for his handcrafted musical instruments.

== Early life and education ==
Hess was born in Weatherford, Oklahoma in 1923. The second of nine children, he was raised in Anadarko by Catholic parents. He briefly attended St. Patrick's Indian Mission School as one of a few white students in his class, an experience that left a lasting impression. He graduated from the Anadarko public schools in 1940. During World War II, Hess served in the Pacific (1943–46), fighting in the Battle of Villa Verde Trail. After the war, he returned to Oklahoma where he married Mildred “Millie” Elmenhorst, a student nurse.

Hess studied art at the University of Oklahoma (OU) under Emilio Amero, a prominent figure in the Mexican muralist movement. He earned a BFA degree in 1948 with a major in mural painting. He completed an MFA degree in 1950, as one of the first graduate assistants at the OU School of Art, directed by Oscar Brousse Jacobson.

== Teaching career ==
Hess first taught as a special instructor at the University of Oklahoma (1948–50). After a stint in commercial design, he taught for one year as an instructor in art at William Woods College (Fulton, Missouri). In 1951, he joined the faculty of Drake University where he taught graphic design, lettering, printmaking, painting, and related subjects. He was active in faculty governance and student affairs, and was promoted to full professor in 1962. He also served as superintendent of the annual Art Salon at the Iowa State Fair for 18 years (1952–70). Hess taught at Drake University for 34 years, raising a family of six along the way. In 1969, he received the annual award for extraordinary undergraduate teaching. He is credited with building up one of the finest graphic design programs in the region.

== Art work ==
Hess was active in a variety of art forms. During the early decades of his career, he produced numerous murals, lithographs, woodcuts, drawings, and sculptures, in addition to paintings. His commercial art was featured in Life, Time, Fortune, and Newsweek and he designed numerous brochures and programs for events at Drake University. Hess was also fascinated with letters as an art form. He created his own type design called Hessans, which was a prizewinner in the International Typeface Competition (1971). His book The Modification of Letterforms (1972, 1981) explains the history and design of each letter of the alphabet. Hess also developed his own phonetic alphabet of 40 characters that he named Tempered Notation, designed to align written and spoken English.

=== Mural art ===
In the 1950s and 1960s, Hess took on numerous mural commissions for businesses, churches, hospitals, schools, and care centers in central Iowa. He worked in a variety of mediums, including mosaic, acrylic, ceramic tile, brick, plexiglass, and stone. His designs were influenced by the Mexican Modernism of Amero, as well as Jean Charlot, who included him in a select group of assistants to execute Inspiration of the Artist, a fresco for the Des Moines Art Center (1956).

The Riverfront YMCA was a major project showcasing five of Hess’ murals, including two exterior brick walls that were the first of their kind and drew national attention (1957–60). He created the Stations of the Cross in glass tile mosaic for St. Theresa Catholic Church (1958–59) and painted the Corporal Works of Mercy in the lobby of Mercy Hospital (1959). His other murals included National Travelers Life Company, Iowa Power and Light Company, Iowa Lutheran Hospital, St. John’s Lutheran Church, and many others in Des Moines and nearby communities.

Hess was recognized for his mural art by the Iowa Chapter of the American Institute of Architects in 1963. Many of his murals have not survived though many remain. When the Riverfront YMCA was demolished in 2015, modified replicas of the exterior brick murals were installed in the new YMCA building. The Story of Power was moved in 1971 to the Des Moines Science Center, now the Bergman Academy. The mosaics in St. Theresa’s Catholic Church also remain intact.

=== Paintings ===
Hess painted throughout his lifetime. In his early career he worked in watercolor, oil, caseins, and egg tempera, before turning almost exclusively to acrylic on gesso panels. He often depicted medieval or biblical subjects, including an early series on the story of the Holy Cross, as well as later works such as Judith Holding a Censer and Supper at Emmaus. He sometimes chose Native American themes, notably Early Oklahoma. Hess produced numerous portraits—of thinkers, artists, leaders, and other iconic figures—ranging from Marcus Aurelius to Marilyn Monroe. He was also drawn to playful scenes of childhood and everyday life, with works such as Tricks or Treats, Garage Sale, and Sunday Afternoon in a Small Park.

Hess frequently played with illusion and layered imagery. Many of his paintings present shifting scenes, depending on the viewer’s focus or vantage point. One large image may be visible at first, while smaller, component images emerge with closer scrutiny. Conversely, small images may catch the eye before the larger scene morphs into view. Hess explained that he applied a muralist’s concern with scale and distance to the composition of his studio paintings. He introduced his double images in 1972 with a solo exhibit he called Images Within Images, and this device would eventually become his trademark. Hess also experimented with panoramic and vanishing perspective, and painted on accordion-pleated panels to create two different scenes, one seen from the left and another from the right.

Stylistically, Hess’ paintings are in the figurative tradition and have been characterized as magic realism. Some have been called surrealist, because of their strange and dreamlike elements. But Hess distanced himself from both movements, and preferred "illusionist" to describe his work. He was influenced by the American regionalists, who he greatly admired, and by the Mexican muralists who he studied. Although his technique evolved over the course of his career, Hess generally painted with careful precision, using rich colors and somewhat flattened, geometric forms.

=== Musical instruments ===
During the 1970s, Hess turned to making musical instruments from the medieval, Renaissance, and Baroque periods. After engraving scrimshaw on ivory recorders, he was inspired to make his own from a variety of woods. He crafted dozens of recorders by hand in his home workshop, ranging in length from six inches to six feet. He finished each one with ornamental carvings of musical, mythical, and other whimsical figures. Hess similarly designed replicas of early stringed instruments – predecessors of modern violins and guitars – including the pochette, mandora, cittern, viol, and baryton. He sometimes added decorative inlay on the body, and carved three-dimensional double images on the pegbox. Hess also made several Appalachian dulcimers and a 17th-century harpsichord.

Altogether, Hess made more than 60 musical instruments over two decades. He took pains to ensure their historical and musical accuracy, studying period artwork and musical texts, including the Syntagma Musicum, a reference work from the early 1600s. Lacking any schematics, Hess developed the mathematical formulas needed to design his own working scale drawings. His instruments have been widely recognized for their artistic and educational value.

== Later life and legacy ==
Hess retired from Drake University as professor emeritus in 1985 and moved to Tulsa, Oklahoma. When his first wife died (1991), he married Tulsa widow Joanne Meillier (1992). He remained active in his home studio well into retirement, amassing nearly 200 paintings and making musical instruments, until Parkinson's disease curtailed these pursuits. Hess died on March 9, 2019, at the age of 95.

Hess’ art works and instruments were exhibited widely, notably at the Renwick Gallery in Washington, D.C. (1978). He received many awards, including Best of Show for The Echo (1955), held by the Philbrook Art Museum. His works were also held by the Container Corporation of America and are currently represented in the National Gallery of Art, the British Museum, the Fred Jones Jr. Museum of Art, and the Brunnier Museum, among others. In 1997, Hess donated more than 50 of his handcrafted instruments to the Mabee-Gerrer Museum in Oklahoma, where the collection is a teaching tool for musicians and historians.

== Publications ==
- Hess, Stanley. “An Apology for the Carved Recorder”. American Recorder, vol. 9, no. 2, 1968, pp. 42–47.
- Hess, Stanley. “Dulcimer Peg Box: Designer Proposes One-Sided Solutions." Fine Woodworking, Summer, 1978, pp. 77–79.
- Hess, Stanley. “Tone Building, Figuratively Speaking, with the Baroque Recorder”. American Recorder, vol. 21, no. 2, 1980, pp. 55–59.
- Hess, Stanley. The Modification of Letterforms. 2nd ed. rev., Art Direction Book Company, 1981. ISBN 9780910158039
