= Christa McAuliffe Fellowship Program =

US Department of Education fellowship program

The Christa McAuliffe Fellowship Program (named after the deceased teacher and astronaut Christa McAuliffe), administered by the United States Department of Education from 1987 to 2002, provided annual fellowships to outstanding public and private elementary and secondary school teachers to continue their education, develop innovative programs, consult with or assist school districts or private school systems, or engage in other educational activities that will improve their knowledge and skills and the education of their students.

Christa McAuliffe Fellows were permitted to use awards for (1) sabbaticals for study or research associated with the objectives of the program or academic improvement, (2) consultation and assistance to local school systems, private schools, or private school systems, (3) development of special innovative programs, (4) projects or partnerships between schools and the business community, (5) programs that utilize new technologies to help students learn, and (6) expanding or replicating model programs of staff development. Recipients were required to return to a teaching position in their current school system for at least 2 years following the completion of their fellowships.

== Past recipients ==
- Carolyn Coakley, 1987
- Terrance Franckowiak, 1988
- Donna Mason, 1988
- Michael McGuffee, 1988
- Renise Marks 1988 [16]
- W. Dean Eastman, 1989
- Carolyn Staudt, 1990
- Marilee Sharon Frickey, 1991
- Robert A. Morrey, 1991
- Sheri Lyn Sohm, 1992
- Wes McCoy, 1993 (Published Georgia Biology, a magazine written mostly by students across Georgia.)
- Richard W. Halsey, 1994
- Kathleen Mason, 1996
- Joanne S. Woods, 1997
- Nancy Cartwright, 1998
- Robert Corbin, 1998
- Helen Schatz Comba 1998
- Kirsten Schmidt McCauley, IA, 1998
- Willene W. Agnew, 1999
- Gary Swick, 1999
- Maureen McQuerry, 1999
- Teri Dary, 2000
- Theresa Battlo Bales, WV, 2000
