= Oleg Zatsarinny =

Ukrainian-American theoretical and computational physicist

Oleg I. Zatsarinny
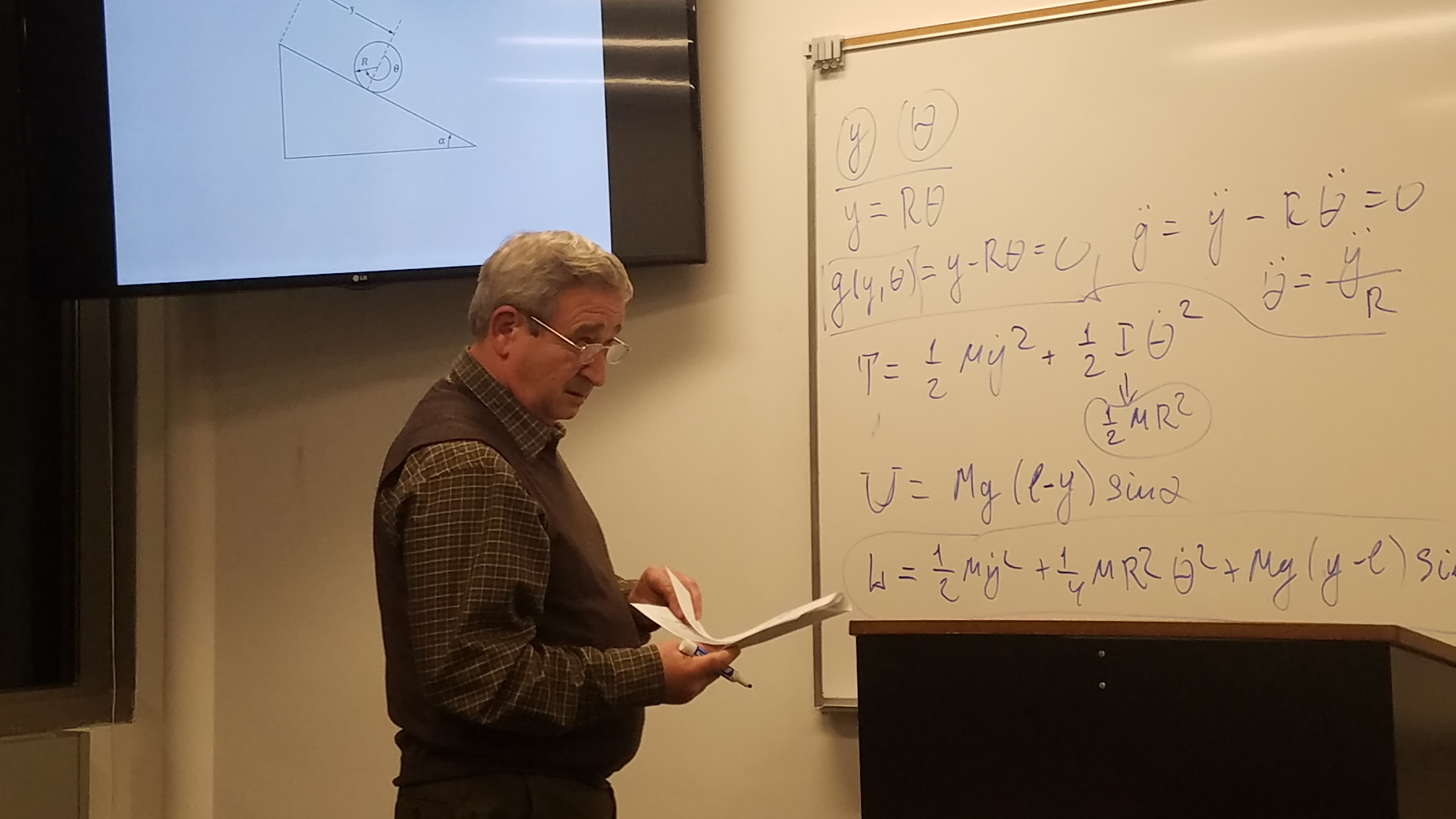
- Dr. Oleg Zatsarinny teaching a physics class
- Born: November 4, 1953; Uzhhorod, Ukrainian SSR, Soviet Union (now Ukraine)
- Died: March 2, 2021 (aged 67); Des Moines, Iowa, United States
- Citizenship: USA
- Education: Moscow Institute of Physics and Technology; Vilnius University
- Known for: B-spline R-matrix programs, BSR and DBSR
- Title: Senior Research Scientist
- Awards: Fellow of the American Physical Society
- Scientific career
- Fields: physics, computational atomic physics
- Workplaces: Uzhhorod National University; Institute of Electron Physics, Ukrainian Academy of Science; Drake University
- Thesis: Study of the Autoionization States of Alkaline and Alkaline Metal Atoms and Their Effects on Recombination and Photoionization processes. (1985)
- Doctoral advisor: V. I. Lendel

Oleg Ivanovich Zatsarinny (1953–2021) was a Ukrainian-American theoretical physicist noted for his contributions to all aspects of research related to electron scattering in atoms. He was awarded the status of Fellow in the American Physical Society, after he was nominated by his Division of Atomic, Molecular & Optical Physics in 2008, for "the development of the B-Spline R-matrix method with non-orthogonal orbital sets for atomic structure calculations of exceptional accuracy and benchmark calculations for excitation and ionization of complex atoms and ions by photon and electron impact."

== Education and research ==
Oleg was born in Uzhhorod, Ukraine. He obtained an MSc degree in 1977 from the Moscow Institute of Physics and Technology under the supervision of E.L. Nagaev. The title of his thesis was Inhomogeneous ferromagnetism of conducting magnetics with ions in a singlet ground state. Upon completion, he obtained a position at Uzhhorod National University, first in the Department of Physical and Quantum Electronics and then in Theoretical Physics. Under the direction of V.I. Lendel of Vilnius University, he obtained a PhD degree in 1985 for a thesis entitled Study of the Autoionization States of Alkaline and Alkaline Metal Atoms and Their Effects on Recombination and Photoionization processes. He was soon appointed Head of Theoretical Physics Division, Laboratory of Electron Collision Physics, Uzhhorod State University. Upon completing and defending his D.Sc. dissertation, he became a senior research associate at the Institute of Electron Physics of the Ukrainian Academy of Science, a position he would hold from 1993 – 2001. In 1995 he co-authored a book on elementary processes in plasmas. It contained many of his results on electron-ion collision cross sections for H-, He-, Li- and Be-like ions, obtained by different methods, including close-coupling and distorted-wave approaches. Together with his supervisor and others, he also edited a book that summarized the status of experiment and theory in his field at that time.

== Immigration to the United States of America ==
After the collapse of the Soviet Union he started a collaboration with W. Mehlhorn at Freiburg University in Germany. His work on non-orthogonal orbitals in atomic calculations lead to an invitation to Vanderbilt University in 1997, where he was introduced to B-spline theory, its application to atomic theory, and computational algorithms.

In May, 2000, Oleg and his wife Tatyana immigrated to the USA. Oleg served as research associate, first with S. S. Tayal, at Clark Atlanta University, then with T.Gorczyca at Western Michigan University, and finally with K. Bartschat, at Drake University in Des Moines, Iowa. There he stayed until the end of his life on March 2, 2021.

In 2006 Oleg published his BSR code that is his most cited work. This code used the R-matrix method to calculate electron–atom and electron–ion collision processes, with options to calculate radiative data, photoionization, and electron scattering. A problem arose, because spurious solutions affected the R-matrix that joins the outer and inner regions. This problem was solved by expressing large and small components by splines of different order. The unpublished Dirac version of BSR and the DBSR_HF program were among the most computationally accurate programs available at that time for atomic calculations.

== See also ==
- List of fellows of the American Physical Society (1998–2010)
