= David Maxwell (academic) =

American academic

David Evans Maxwell

12th president of Drake University
- In office May 15, 1999 – June 30, 2015
- Preceded by: Robert D. Ray (interim); Michael Ferrari

Personal details
- Born: December 2, 1944 (age 81) New York City, New York, U.S.
- Spouse: Madeleine Mali Maxwell (dec. 2023)
- Children: Justin & Stephen
- Education: Grinnell College; Brown University

David Maxwell (born December 2, 1944) served as the 12th president of Drake University in Des Moines, Iowa from 1999 until 2015. He is the son of jazz trumpeter Jimmy Maxwell.

== Biography ==
Maxwell served as president of Drake University from May 1999 through June, 2015, and held a faculty appointment as professor of literature. He was awarded the title of president emeritus by Drake's board of trustees upon his retirement. He was director of the National Foreign Language Center in Washington, D.C., from 1993 to 1999, after serving as president of Whitman College from 1989 to 1993. Maxwell was at Tufts University from 1971 to 1989 as a faculty member in Russian language and literature (chairing both the program in Russian and the Soviet & East European area program), and served as dean of undergraduate studies from 1981-89.

Since June, 2015 Maxwell has been a senior fellow of the Association of Governing Boards (AGB) and a member of AGB’s consulting practice.

Maxwell earned his bachelor's degree in Russian area studies from Grinnell College in 1966. He was a participant in the critical languages program at Princeton University in 1964-65. Maxwell received his master’s and doctorate degrees in Slavic languages and literatures from Brown University, in 1968 and 1974, respectively. He was a Fulbright Fellow in Moscow, U.S.S.R. in 1970-71.

Maxwell was a member of the executive committee of the Business/Higher Education Forum (BHEF) from 2004 until his retirement, and is currently an emeritus member of BHEF. He has served on the boards of directors of the American Council on Education (ACE), the Association of American Colleges & Universities (AAC&U), the National Association of Independent Colleges & Universities (NAICU), and the Council on Higher Education Accreditation (CHEA), including a term as chair. Maxwell was a member of the Higher Education Working Group on Global Issues of the Council on Foreign Relations and the National Leadership Council of AAC&U’s “Liberal Education for America’s Promise” Initiative. He is a member of the Iowa Advisory Council of the U.S. Global Leadership Coalition. Maxwell has served on Grinnell College’s Board of Trustees since 2016, including a term as chair (2019–21)

An internationally published scholar on the prose of Russian writer Anton Chekhov during his faculty career, Maxwell writes frequently on higher education issues for professional journals and other media outlets. As a senior administrator, he has had significant experience in a broad range of areas that include: program review and prioritization; institutional change; strategic planning; shared governance and board development; internationalization and globalization; integration of liberal arts education with preparation for careers; fundraising and community relations.

In 2011, Maxwell received the Chief Executive Leadership Award from District VI, Council for Advancement and Support of Education. In 2012, he received the A. Arthur Davis Distinguished Community Leadership Award from the Greater Des Moines Leadership Institute, the Robert D. Ray Pillar of Character Award from Character Counts in Iowa, and the President’s Award from Region IV-East of the National Association of Student Personnel Administrators (NASPA). In 2014, Dr. Maxwell was the first college/university president inducted into the Iowa Business Hall of Fame. In 2015, he was named the “Person of the Year” by the Chinese Association of Iowa, and received the Iowa Governor’s Volunteer Award.

In May 2011, Maxwell summited Mt. Kilimanjaro with his sons Justin and Stephen and members of the Drake University football team.

Preceded by Michael Ferrari; Robert D. Ray (interim)	President of Drake University; May 15, 1999–June 30, 2015	Succeeded by Marty Martin
