= RAF Boreham =

Former Royal Air Force station

RAF Boreham USAAF Station AAF-161
- Near Boreham, Essex in England
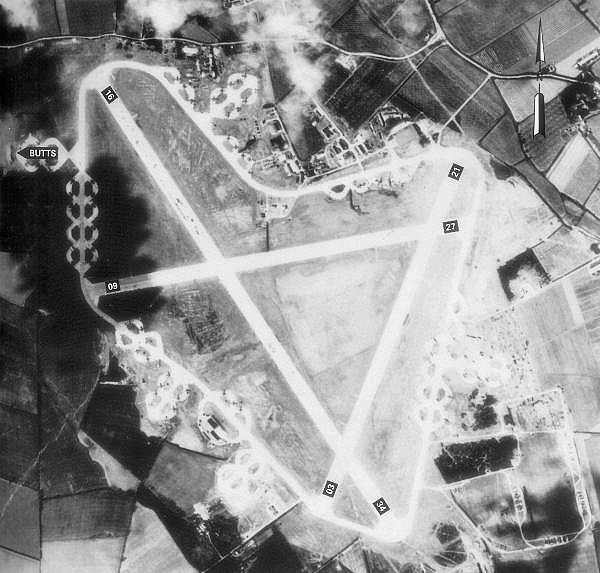
- RAF Boreham photographed on 20 April 1944. Throughout much of the postwar years, Ford Motor Company preserved much of the airfield as a proving ground, however in recent years extensive quarrying has removed much of the south part of the airfield.

Site information
- Type: Royal Air Force station
- Code: JM
- Owner: Air Ministry
- Operator: Royal Air Force; United States Army Air Forces
- Controlled by: Ninth Air Force

Location
- Shown within Essex RAF Boreham (the United Kingdom)
- Coordinates: 51°46′47″N 000°31′15″E

Site history
- Built: 1943
- In use: 1944 - 1945
- Battles/wars: European theatre of World War II

Airfield information
- Elevation: 12 metres (39 ft) AMSL
Runways
Direction	Length and surface
03/21	1,250 metres (4,101 ft) Asphalt
09/27	1,250 metres (4,101 ft) Asphalt
15/33	1,800 metres (5,906 ft) Asphalt

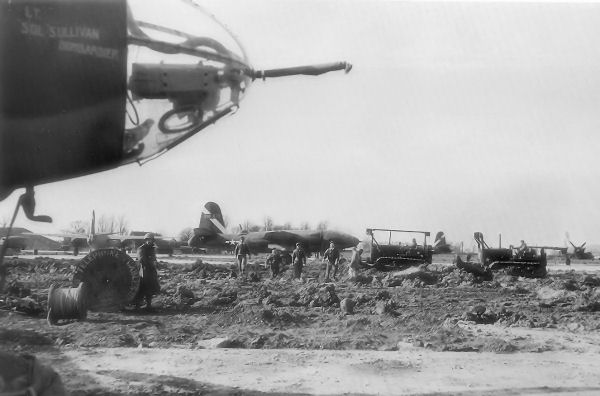
B-26 Marauders of the 394th Bomb Group at still-unfinished Boreham Airfield, 14 March 1944.

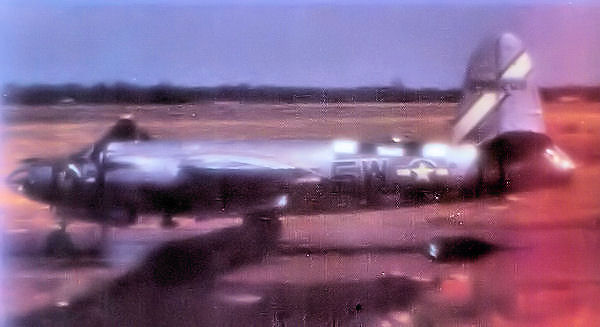
Martin B-26G-5-MA Marauder Serial 43-34373 of the 587th Bomb Squadron.

Royal Air Force Boreham or more simply RAF Boreham is a former Royal Air Force station in Essex, England. The airfield was always known locally as : "Boreham Airfield". The airfield is located approximately 4 miles (6.4 km) north-northeast of Chelmsford.

Opened in 1944, it was used by the United States Army Air Forces. During the war it was used primarily as bomber and a troop transport airfield for paratroopers. After the war it was closed in late 1945.

Essex Police operated a police helicopter from here between 1989 - 2012 when it was taken over by the National Police Air Service who continued to operate until 31 August 2018. G-POLF (formerly G-ESEX) was the last aircraft to leave at 0945hrs on this date operated by Capt Rob Mitchell, TFO Nick Spencer and Pc Daniel Wabe

== History ==
=== USAAF use ===
Boreham was known as USAAF Station AAF-161 for security reasons by the USAAF during the war, and by which it was referred to instead of location. Its USAAF Station Code was "JM".

==== 394th Bombardment Group ====
The first use of Boreham airfield was by the 394th Bombardment Group, arriving from Kellogg AAF, near Battle Creek, Michigan on 10 March 1944. Operational squadrons of the group were:

- 584th Bomb Squadron (K5)
- 585th Bomb Squadron (4T)
- 586th Bomb Squadron (H9)
- 587th Bomb Squadron (5W)

Their group marking was a white diagonal band across the fin and rudder.

In the weeks that followed, the 394th was repeatedly sent to attack bridges in occupied France and the Low Countries, which led to its dubbing itself 'The Bridge Busters'. The 394th was moved on 24 July to RAF Holmsley South in the New Forest.

==== 315th Troop Carrier Group ====
Boreham then passed to the 315th Troop Carrier Group in March 1945, which flew 80 Douglas C-47 Skytrains to drop men of the British 6th Airborne Division during Operation Varsity, the assault on the Rhine River.

=== RAF use ===
The following units were here at some point:

- No. 91 (Forward) Staging Post
- No. 91 Staging Post
- No. 120 (Major) Staging Post
- No. 122 (Major) Staging Post
- No. 123 (Major) Staging Post
- No. 160 Staging Post
- No. 161 Staging Post
- No. 162 Staging Post
- No. 163 Staging Post
- No. 164 Staging Post
- No. 165 Staging Post
- No. 166 Staging Post
- No. 167 Staging Post
- No. 168 Staging Post
- No. 169 Staging Post
- No. 170 Staging Post

=== Postwar Governmental use ===
The airfield was closed in 1945. The Essex County Council made use of some of the domestic site Nissen huts to house the homeless and the land was used by Co-Partnership Farms.

=== Boreham Circuit ===
Boreham Circuit
- Location: Essex, England
- Opened: 1946
- Closed: 1955
- Major events: Grand Prix motor racing
- Length: 4.76 km (2.96 mi)

With the facility released from military control, in 1946, the West Essex Car Club developed the 4.76 kilometre perimeter track for motor racing. Although not on the official Grand Prix calendar, Boreham Circuit hosted competitive races between 1949 and 1952. Among the teams that raced at Boreham were BRM, Connaught, Frazer Nash and Talbot-Lago. Among the drivers who raced there were Mike Hawthorn, Stirling Moss and Ken Wharton. In 1955 the Ford Motor Company bought the airfield to use as a test facility for trucks, as well as the base for their Competitions Department where they prepared their cars.

In the late 1970s Boreham Proving Ground was the test site for Ford Heavy Truck Development. The development engineers at nearby Ford Dunton worked out various test programmes, and the Test Engineers at Boreham carried these out and reported back the data. One common test was RLD, or 'Road Load Data', where a chassis would be fitted with various strain gauges, and the data from these recorded. This was the main test site for Ford Trucks, and the Ford Cargo, released in 1980, was extensively tested here against competitor trucks. There were many various surfaces at Boreham to drive the trucks on. "Rest of the World" road, was a fairly rigorous route, with smooth surfaces, some undulating surfaces and some pot-holes. "Korean Road" was full of pot-holes and considered to be the worst test for a truck. Test drivers were not very happy if they were allocated four days of driving "Korean Road" to gather RLD since they were bumped around in the cab constantly. Aside the main entrance to Boreham was a small unit that was Ford Rally Sport. They built the Ford rally cars of the late 70s and early 80s there.

=== Essex & Herts Air Ambulance ===
Essex & Herts Air Ambulance was based here from its launch in 1998, when it only served Essex, until 2011. In 2008 Hertfordshire was added to the service.

Boreham previously housed:

G-ESAM

G-ESAM was a Bölkow 105, operated between 1998 and 2003.

G-SSXX

Eurocopter EC135 operated from May 2003 until 2010.

G-EHAA

In 2010, in line with the new aircraft for Hertfordshire, Essex's aircraft was upgraded to an MD902.

== Current use ==
In July 1990, the Essex Police Air Support Unit began operating their Aérospatiale Twin Squirrel from the airfield, and in 1992 a hangar to house this helicopter was constructed beside the control tower. The runways and 40 loop hardstands still remained and the south-west hangar was in use as a store.

During the 1990s the airfield began to be dismantled for aggregate. Pioneer Aggregates has an interest in the southwest part of the airfield and much of the airfield has been subjected to extensive gravel extraction.

The north side of the airfield remains relatively intact with the exception of the dispersal loop hardstands, which have been removed. The control tower remains, which is used by the National Police Air Service with their Eurocopter EC-135T a T2 hangar and short concreted lengths of runway ends. The remaining parts of the former runways, perimeter track and hardstands are now grassy areas. The control tower was reportedly, knocked down in late 2023.

== See also ==
- List of former Royal Air Force stations
