= RAF Holmsley South =

Royal Air Force station in Hampshire, England

RAF Holmsley South USAAF Station AAF-455
- Near New Milton, Hampshire in England
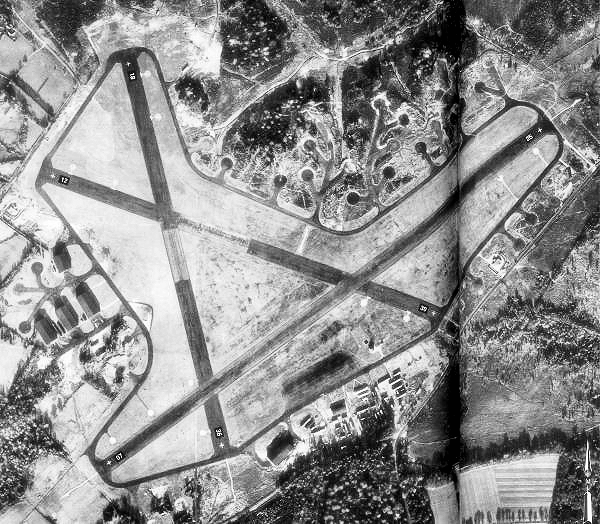
- Photo-Mosaic of Holmsley South airfield - December 1946 after all flying had ended with "X" on each runway end.

Site information
- Type: Royal Air Force station
- Code: HM
- Owner: Air Ministry
- Operator: Royal Air Force; 1942-44 & 1944- United States Army Air Forces 1944
- Controlled by: RAF Coastal Command 1942-44; RAF Fighter Command 1944 * No. 10 Group RAF; RAF Transport Command 1944-46 * No. 116 Wing RAF; Ninth Air Force

Location
- Shown within Hampshire RAF Holmsley South (the United Kingdom)
- Coordinates: 50°47′18″N 001°41′58″W

Site history
- Built: 1941/42
- Built by: John Laing & Son Ltd
- In use: September 1942 - October 1946
- Battles/wars: European theatre of World War II

Airfield information
- Elevation: 6 metres (20 ft) AMSL
Runways
Direction	Length and surface
00/00	Tarmac
00/00	Tarmac
00/00	Tarmac

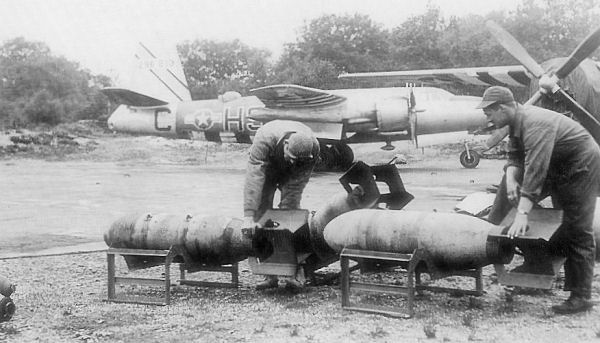
Loading 500lb bombs on to Martin B-26B-55-MA Marauder Serial 42-96213 of the 586th Bombardment Squadron. The aircraft was shot down by anti-aircraft fire on 22 March 1945.

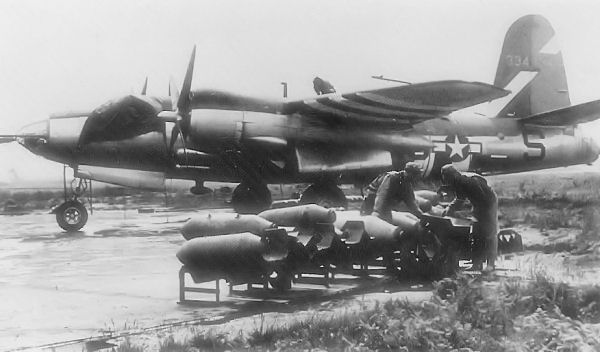
Bomb loading on to Martin B-26G-1-MA Marauder Serial 43-34194 of the 584th Bombardment Squadron at Holmsley.

Royal Air Force Holmsley South or more simply RAF Holmsley South is a former Royal Air Force station in Hampshire, England. The airfield is located approximately 5 miles (8.0 km) northeast of Christchurch, Dorset.

Opened in 1942, it was used by both the Royal Air Force and United States Army Air Forces. During the war it was used primarily as a bomber and later as a transport airfield. After the war it was closed in late 1946. Christchurch Council from December 1946 to 1961 used the old accommodation sites including WAAF Nissen Huts as temporary accommodation for families waiting for a council house.

Today the remains of the airfield are part of a Forestry Commission project near the New Forest.

== RAF Use ==
The following RAF squadrons were here at some point:

- No. 58 Squadron RAF
- No. 167 (Gold Coast) Squadron RAF
- No. 182 Squadron RAF (1944)
- No. 184 Squadron RAF (1944)
- No. 232 Squadron RAF
- No. 246 Squadron RAF
- No. 295 Squadron RAF
- No. 418 Squadron RCAF (1944)
- No. 502 (Ulster) Squadron AAF
- No. 547 Squadron RAF

Additional RAF units:

- No. 121 Airfield Headquarters RAF became No. 121 (Rocket Projectile) Wing RAF
  - No. 174 (Mauritius) Squadron RAF (1944)
  - No. 175 Squadron RAF (1944)
  - No. 245 (Northern Rhodesian) Squadron RAF (1944)
- No. 133 (Polish) (Fighter) Wing RAF
  - No. 129 (Mysore) Squadron RAF (1944)
  - No. 306 Polish Fighter Squadron (1944)
  - No. 315 Polish Fighter Squadron (1944)
- No. 144 (RCAF) Airfield Headquarters RAF
  - No. 441 Squadron RCAF (1944)
  - No. 442 Squadron RCAF (1944)
  - No. 443 Squadron RCAF (1944)
- No. 1320 ('Abdullah') Flight RAF (1944)
- No. 1 Section from No. 1552 (Radio Aids Training) Flight RAF
- No. 2758 Squadron RAF Regiment
- No. 2798 Squadron RAF Regiment
- No. 2807 Squadron RAF Regiment
- No. 2812 Squadron RAF Regiment
- No. 2822 Squadron RAF Regiment
- No. 3205 Servicing Commando
- Halifax Development Flight RAF (1944-??)

== USAAF use ==
Holmsley South was known as USAAF Station AAF-455 for security reasons by the USAAF during the war, and by which it was referred to instead of location. Its USAAF Station Code was "HM".

The 394th Bomb Group moved to Holmsley from RAF Boreham between 24 and 28 July 1944. Operational squadrons of the group were:

- 584th Bomb Squadron (K5)
- 585th Bomb Squadron (4T)
- 586th Bomb Squadron (H9)
- 587th Bomb Squadron (5W)

The group remained in the theatre to serve with United States Air Forces in Europe as part of the army of occupation at Kitzingen, Germany. It was transferred, without personnel and equipment, to the United States on 15 February 1946 and was inactivated on 31 March 1946.

== Current use ==
With the facility released from military control in 1946, Holmsley South has since stood derelict and, while a few odd parts of the runways and a few dispersal points remain, the vast majority of the concreted areas have been removed along with the buildings around the airfield leaving a large open area. Some other areas have been planted with conifers by the Forestry Commission. Several public camping sites and a caravan park have been created on the former hardstanding groupings along the northeast side of the main perimeter track, as well as both sides of the former 07 runway on the southwest of the airfield.

== See also ==
- List of former Royal Air Force stations
