= Kim Uchiyama =

American abstract painter (born 1955)

- Born: 1955 (age 70–71); Des Moines, Iowa, US
- Education: New York Studio School; Drake University
- Known for: Painting, drawings
- Style: Abstract
- Awards: New York Foundation for the Arts
- Website: Kim Uchiyama

Kim Uchiyama, Equinox, oil on linen, 66" x 72", 2023.

Kim Uchiyama (born 1955) is an American abstract painter based in New York City. Her work distills visual tropes of nature and architecture—typically inspired by the Mediterranean region—into a minimalist, geometric vocabulary of stacked, colored horizontal bands and vertical bars, which she often punctuates with bands of unpainted linen or canvas.

Rooted in bedrock modernist concerns such as symmetry, proportion and simplicity, her paintings have been described as "Apollonian" orchestrations of color and shape that suggest idealized landscapes, structures and harmonic relationships. A key source of interest in her art is from its ability to convey diverse moods and associations despite a tightly circumscribed vocabulary. Critic Karen Wilkin wrote, "Uchiyama makes austere, elegant paintings that explore the expressive possibilities of order, geometry, interval and associative hues" and function as "poetic reinventions of her sense of place."

Uchiyama's work belongs to the art collections of the Delaware Art Museum, Princeton University Art Museum and San Angelo Museum of Fine Arts. She has exhibited at the Baker Museum, Des Moines Art Center, LSU Museum of Art and South Bend Museum of Art, among others. She is a member of American Abstract Artists and became the organization's president in 2025.

== Life and career ==
Uchiyama was born in Des Moines, Iowa in 1955. She studied painting, art history and American literature at Drake University and in Florence, Italy, before attending the New York Studio School in the late 1970s. In 1976, she attended the Yale Summer School of Music and Art. Her early work included imagined, simplified landscapes that straddled representation and abstraction; critic Eleanor Heartney linked them to artists ranging from Piero della Francesca to early American abstractionists Arthur Dove and Marsden Hartley.

Uchiyama has had solo exhibitions at the Janet Kurnatowski and Lohin Geduld galleries, 499 Park Avenue and Helm Contemporary in New York City, John Davis Gallery, Kathryn Markel Fine Arts and Pamela Salisbury Gallery in New York state, and Spazio Contemporaneo Agorà in Palermo, Italy. She appeared in the surveys "The Onward of Art" (2016) and "Blurring Boundaries: Women of the American Abstract Artists 1936-Present" (2018–23), among others.

In addition to artmaking, Uchiyama has written for art publications including Artcritical, Delicious Line and Two Coats of Paint.

== Work and reception ==
Kim Uchiyama, Geo, oil on canvas, 18" x 14", 2009.

Since the mid-2000s, Uchiyama's art has been largely inspired by the sensations she has experienced in Mediterranean locales. She seeks to convey in minimal, abstract language and color such things as the area's natural light, shifting hues, and the sensual resonance and ancient architectural forms of its excavated temples and ruins.

Her paintings meld modernist and classical lineages recalling the geometric works of Brice Marden, David Novros and Doug Ohlson, the color studies of Josef Albers, and the hues and paint handling of Italian fresco painters, among others. According to critic John Yau, Uchiyama's choice of color, height, placement and spacing imbue her painted and bare canvas bands with equal importance, yielding "dynamic, tightly choreographed compositions." Comparing the experience to the rhythms of music, he wrote, "Like watching dancers move back and forth across the stage, looking becomes an active, engaged act, which is uncommon in the work of celebrated Minimalists."

Uchiyama achieves variety in mood and association by taking liberties with her use of color, proportion, spacing and gesture. She plays on the human tendency to involuntarily interpret even minimally presented earth tones, greens and blues as metaphors for land, vegetation, sea and sky, composing color sequences that echo familiar, evocative relationships. Likewise, she deploys dark to light tones or thick to thin bands to create the sensation of single-point, receding perspective or ascendant movement. In other instances, however, she complicates or undercuts such perceptions by reversing arrangements and color schemes, contradicting laws of gravity, or interspersing areas of bare canvas. These strategies emphasize the paintings as objects, surfaces and idealized forms and resist readings of landscape or architecture.

Uchiyama shifts attention from allusion to the making of the paintings by animating their surfaces with free-hand-painted edges, brushy paint handling, and occasional distressed passages that reveal underlayers of color. Despite being abstract and geometric, her paintings arise out of a deliberate, intuitive process of accretion in which colors, shapes and actions build upon one another.

=== Bodies of work and exhibitions, 2006–present ===
Kim Uchiyama, Selinus I, oil on linen, 72" x 66", 2018.

In exhibitions such as "Strata" (2006) and "Archaeo" (2010), Uchiyama presented vertical oils composed of bright, stacked horizontal bands of varying widths, which in form and title (e.g., Stratum, Excavation) referenced geological layering. The latter show's paintings evolved from watercolors painted during a 2006 summer residency at the BAU institute in the coastal province of Puglia, Italy. They featured unexpected combinations of jewel-colored, handmade stripes, which in works like Geo (2009), Uchiyama began to distress more emphatically by scraping to create scars and weathering effects (as in frescoes or craquelure). ARTnews's Doug McClemont deemed these paintings "analytical landscapes … as if all the colors of a certain vista had been sorted and stacked and came together to create a theoretical portrait of a specific location and the mood that place stirs up."

In the exhibitions "Arcadia" (2019), "Intervals" (2021) and "Heat and Shadow" (2022), Uchiyama presented large paintings inspired by the light, history, rough landscape and ordered architecture of Sicily. Titled after Doric temples and Greek gods, they employed close-valued hues evoking earth, sun, stone, water and sky that echoed the saturated colors found when extended shadows recede in bright, overhead midday sunlight. The paintings Selinus I and Selinus II (2018) referenced temples of the ancient city Selinunte built on an acropolis high above the sea; each includes three painted blue bands, emphasizing the visual dominance of sea and sky.

Uchiyama's subsequent show, "Loggia" (2024), centered on paintings of interlocking color bands and bars in vertical and horizontal arrangements that recall ancient city foundations and architectural post-and-lintel and columned forms (e.g., Equinox, 2023; Threshold, 2024). Reviewer Jonathan Stevenson wrote, "No mere formalist, Uchiyama is explicitly interested in the fluidity of inside and outside space, which broadly aligns with that of comfort and risk. For all their structural calmness, her paintings can convey the paradoxically languid emotional turbulence of, say, Antonioni’s [film] L'Avventura."

== Collections and other recognition ==
Uchiyama received a fellowship from the New York Foundation for the Arts (1994) and artist residencies from Art Cake (2024), the BAU Institute (2006, 2007, 2011), MacDowell (2007, 2010) and Virginia Center for the Creative Arts (2009, 2012), among other organizations.

Uchiyama's work is in the collections of Architectenatelier Wins (Belgium), Art Museum of Southeast Texas, Delaware Art Museum, Ewing Gallery of Art & Architecture (University of Tennessee, Knoxville), Princeton University Art Museum, San Angelo Museum of Fine Arts, Sarah Moody Gallery of Art (University of Alabama), and Spazio Contemporaneo Agorà, as well as private collections.
