= Mary Bock =

American journalist

Mary Angela Bock is a journalist and professor of journalism. She is an associate professor of journalism at University of Texas at Austin in the School of Media and Journalism with an expertise in visual communication, citizen journalism and representation.

== Career ==
Bock attended Drake University for both her BA in communications, received in 1984, and her MA in communications, received in 1986. In 2009, Bock received her PhD from the Annenberg School of Communication of the University of Pennsylvania.

Bock worked for KCCI-TV in Des Moines, Iowa as a reporter and assignment editor from 1982 until 1988. She worked as a field producer and assignment editor at WPVI-TV in Philadelphia, Pennsylvania in 1989 until 2003. She worked at Kutztown University, becoming an associate professor in the Department of Speech and Theatre in 2009. She left Kutztown in 2012 and joined the University of Texas at Austin School of Journalism, becoming an associate professor.

Bock continues to be associated with journalistic associations, including the National Press Photographers Association, the International Communication Association (ICA), the National Communication Association and the Association for Education in Journalism and Mass Communication (AEJMC). Bock is the vice-chair of the ICA Visual Communication Studies Division, an organization of scholars who study forms of visual communication.

== Research ==
Bock has published 4 books. Her book, Video Journalism: Beyond the One Man Band, features interviews and field observations of video journalists to understand the role and effect of video journalists on the news. Visual Communication Theory and Research discusses visual communication research in digital media and news, looking at a variety of traditional and new mass media. Content Analysis Reader contains a collection of articles and studies about content analysis research. Seeing Justice: Witnessing, Crime and Punishment in Visual Media analyzes the relationship between law enforcement and media made by video and visual journalism. Bock's book, Visual Communication Theory and Research: A Mass Communication Perspective, co-written with architect Shahira Fahmy and Wayne Wanta, won the National Communication Association's 2015 Outstanding Book Award.

Bock has articles published in the Journal of Visual Literacy, Visual Studies, Women's Studies in Communication, Feminist Media Studies, Visual Communication Quarterly, New Media and Society, Journalism Studies, and Information Communication & Society.

She is also a contributor to the International Encyclopedia of Media Effects, Citizen Journalism: Global Perspectives, and Visual Imagery and Human Rights Practice.

Bock also produced research on beauty standards for women in the public eye, as news anchors on broadcast television, which found that reporters are held to a White standard of beauty and hairstyle is used as a way of enforcing gender and racial stereotypes. Bock's research has been used to analyze the way female news anchors are compared to their male counterparts, and how journalists write about the #MeToo movement. This research has received international attention. Bock's research focuses on visual journalists, photojournalism, and how the American judiciary system is portrayed in the media. Other work involves how video technology and video journalists affect the news and its audience. Bock's research on cop-watching and practices about filming the police have gained media attention as well. Bock has interviewed about how citizens can use video to change the narrative of police encounters.

== Works ==
- Bock, M. A. (2021). Seeing Justice: Witnessing, Crime and Punishment in Visual Media. Oxford University Press
- Fahmy, S., Bock, M.A., Wanta, W. (2014) Visual Communication Theory and Research: A Mass Communication Perspective. New York: Palgrave.
- Bock, M. A. (2012): Video Journalism: Beyond the One Man Band. NY: Peter Lang
- Krippendorff, K. & Bock, M.A. (Eds.) (2008). The Content Analysis Reader. Thousand Oaks, CA: Sage.
