= Francis M. Wilhoit =

American political scientist (1920-2010)

- Born: Francis Marion Wilhoit; April 24, 1920; Moore County, North Carolina, U.S.
- Died: June 9, 2010 (aged 90); Carthage, North Carolina, U.S.
- Education: Harvard University
- Occupation: Political scientist
- Employer: Drake University

Francis Marion "Frank" Wilhoit (/ˈwɪlhɔɪt/; April 24, 1920 – June 9, 2010) was an American political scientist and author who was the Thomas F. Sheehan Professor of Political Science at Drake University.

== Life ==
Wilhoit was born in 1920 in North Carolina. He attended Harvard University, where he earned a bachelor's degree, a master in public affairs, and a PhD in political science. He was friends with Henry Kissinger and Zbigniew Brzezinski in college.

Before going to college, Wilhoit worked in military intelligence as a cryptographer for the United States Army Air Forces during World War II. He also worked for the Central Intelligence Agency (CIA).

Wilhoit taught in Georgia and Florida. In 1961, he joined the faculty in the department of political science at Drake University. He was Thomas F. Sheehan Professor from 1981 to 1985, and retired in 1990. He wrote several books.

Wilhoit was vocal in his opposition to racism. In 1967, he spoke about the history of slavery as part of the Progressive Young Negro Enterprises's Negro Heritage Series. One of his books was about massive resistance in the Southern United States; he was awarded the 1973 Chastain Prize for the book. In 1976, he accused a Christian pastor in Texas of hypocrisy; the pastor had denounced the publication of Playboy but had supported Jim Crow laws decades earlier.

Wilhoit lived alone, and was an opera aficionado. He died on June 9, 2010, in Carthage, North Carolina, at age 90.

== Selected works ==
- Wilhoit, Francis M (1973). The Politics of Massive Resistance. New York: George Braziller. ISBN 978-0-8076-0700-8. OCLC 185875294.
- Wilhoit, Francis M (1979). The Quest for Equality in Freedom. New Brunswick, New Jersey: Transaction Books. ISBN 978-0-87855-240-5. OCLC 493261129.
