= Operation Clarion =

1945 Allied bombing campaign in Germany

- Part of Combined Bomber Offensive
Date	22–23 February 1945
Location	Nazi Germany 51°N 09°E

Belligerents
RAF Bomber Command; US Army Air Forces	Luftwaffe

Strength
20,000 bombers and escort fighters.	

Operation Clarion was a late-war campaign of the Allied strategic bombing of Germany. Two hundred German transport targets were attacked to open Operation Veritable–Operation Grenade. The Allied air forces sent 3,500 bombers and nearly 5,000 fighters against targets in Germany to destroy all means of transport available. Targets included rail stations, barges, docks, and bridges.
