= Palace of Beaulieu =

Former royal palace in Boreham, Essex, England

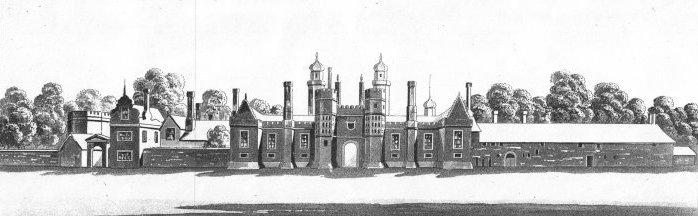

- Location within Essex
- 51°45′51.84″N 0°30′42.84″E
- Location: Boreham
- OS grid reference: TL7346010284

Listed Building – Grade I

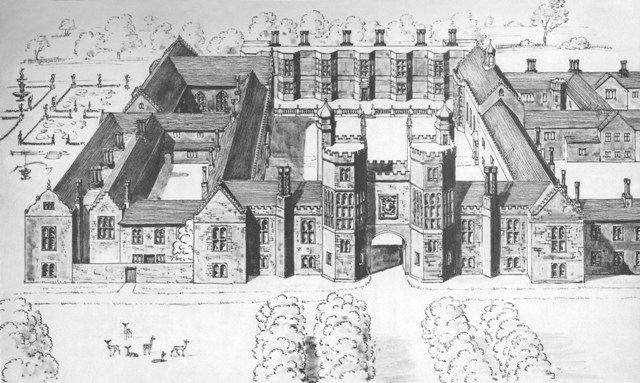
Beaulieu Palace circa 1580

The Palace of Beaulieu (/ˈbjuːli/ BEW-lee) or Newhall is a former royal palace in Boreham, Essex, England, north-east of Chelmsford. The surviving part is a Grade I listed building. The property is currently occupied by New Hall School.

== History ==
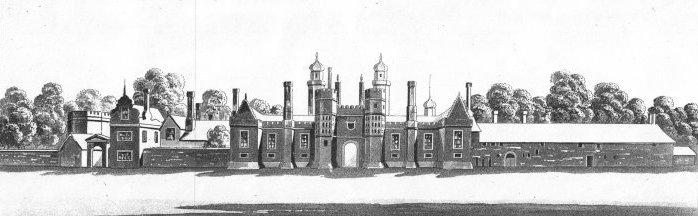
Beaulieu in 1669 from Count Magalotti

The estate on which it was built – the manor of Walhfare in Boreham – was granted to the Canons of Waltham Abbey in 1062. After various changes of possession, it was granted by the Crown to Thomas Butler, 7th Earl of Ormond in 1491. By this time, it had a house called New Hall.

In 1516, New Hall was sold by Thomas Boleyn, father of Anne Boleyn, to King Henry VIII for £1,000. (Note: "Five Ways to Compute the Relative Value of a UK Pound amount, 1516 to Present". Measuringworth.com. £543,000 based on RPI in 2012 money or £5,440,000 on the basis of average earnings) The king rebuilt the house in brick at a cost of £17,000. (Note: "Five Ways to Compute the Relative Value of a UK Pound amount, 1517 to Present". Measuringworth.com. £10,400,000 based on RPI in 2012 money or £102,000,000 on the basis of average earnings) He gave his new palace the name Beaulieu, meaning "beautiful place" in French. The name expressed Henry's desire for fine things, though the name change did not outlast the century.

A royal wardrobe official, James Chapell, took measurements of the new apartments and travelled to Flanders to buy tapestries. He bought eleven different qualities of material, to cover an area of 3,238 Flemish ells (1,818 square yards). The chronicle writer Edward Hall describes a banquet and masque at "Newhall, otherwyse called Beaulieu" in September 1519. Eight disguised courtiers entered after the feast and danced with the ladies. Catherine of Aragon removed their visors or masks, revealing them to be all men aged over fifty. Another group of six younger men, including four hostages for the French treaty, then came in costume to dance.

On 23 July 1527 Henry's court arrived at Beaulieu on his summer progress, staying, unusually, for over a month in the company of a large number of nobles and their wives, including Anne Boleyn's father who had been created Viscount Rochford, the Dukes of Norfolk and Suffolk, the Marquess of Exeter, the Earls of Oxford, Essex, and Rutland, and Viscount Fitzwalter. It was here that Henry devised a scheme to allow him to cohabit with his intended successor of Queen Catherine of Aragon, Anne Boleyn, by obtaining a Papal bull that declared Henry's marriage to Catherine invalid, effectively allowing him to commit bigamy by claiming he was technically unmarried in the first place. This plan was dropped when Cardinal Wolsey discovered the plan, though Pope Clement VII did, in fact, issue a bull to the same effect that December.

In October 1533, the daughter of Queen Catherine, Mary I, and her companion Margaret Douglas, who had been staying at Beaulieu for some time, were evicted. The king had recently granted the palace to George Boleyn (Anne Boleyn's brother). George had been a keeper at Beaulieu when the palace was in the hands of the king. The royal inventory of 1547 noted 29 great beds, four bathing rooms with wooden floors and beds set in the wall, and a library with 37 titles.

After Anne Boleyn was beheaded and Henry married Jane Seymour, he was convinced by his new wife to bring his daughters back to court. In 1537, when Queen Jane died after giving birth to a son, Edward, Mary, Henry's eldest daughter was made godmother to her half-brother Edward and acted as chief mourner at the Queen's funeral. Henry granted her a household and Mary was permitted to reside in royal palaces. Her privy purse expenses for nearly the whole of this period have been published and show that Hatfield Palace, the Palace of Beaulieu (also called Newhall), Richmond, and Hunsdon were among her principal places of residence. Some of the furnishings at Newhall were taken away for Edward's lodgings and wardrobe. Henry VIII gave Newhall to Mary as a bequest in his will, and it was her home during the reign of her brother Edward VI.

== Earls of Sussex and Buckingham ==
Queen Elizabeth I granted the estate in 1573 to Thomas Radclyffe, 3rd Earl of Sussex, who seems to have largely rebuilt the north wing. It is not known though whether he rebuilt other parts of the palace; a fire had occurred in Henry VIII's time and the palace could have been mostly rebuilt then. Soon after the north range was completed, Thomas installed Elizabeth's coat of arms above the main entrance which is still visible today. Elizabeth I came to New Hall in September 1579. She was greeted by a theatrical entertainment presenting Jupiter and a thunderstorm. The next day there was jousting. A sleeping knight was brought in a chariot led by a maiden, and appeared to be revived by the Queen. Elizabeth was given a horse, a cloak, and a riding safeguard for hunting the next day.

The 3rd Earl's will details his furnishings, mentioning rooms at New Hall including the royal presence chamber hanged with tapestry of the "Dance of Death". Some of the tapestry was supplied by Horatio Palavicino. A crimson velvet "sparver" canopy was embroidered with hands, dragons, and porcupines (recorded as "porpentines"). Another inventory notes tapestry with subjects including Alexander, Esther, and the Planets. Some tapestry remaining at Newhall in 1583 had been left by Mary I.

In July 1622, Robert Radclyffe, 5th Earl of Sussex, sold the house to George Villiers, 1st Duke of Buckingham for £30,000. James VI and I and Prince Charles visited in September 1622. It was said that Buckingham's improvements to the house were directed by Inigo Jones. Balthazar Gerbier and a carpenter made an architectural model for the house. Buckingham improved the gardens with the help of John Tradescant.

During the English Civil War, Oliver Cromwell took possession of the estate for the sum of five shillings. After reverting to the 2nd Duke of Buckingham at the Restoration, it was sold to George Monck, 1st Duke of Albemarle, and the court of King Charles II was frequently entertained there. Cosimo III de' Medici, Grand Duke of Tuscany, visited in 1669 and a member of his retinue produced a view of the house. A copy of this view was published in 1821.

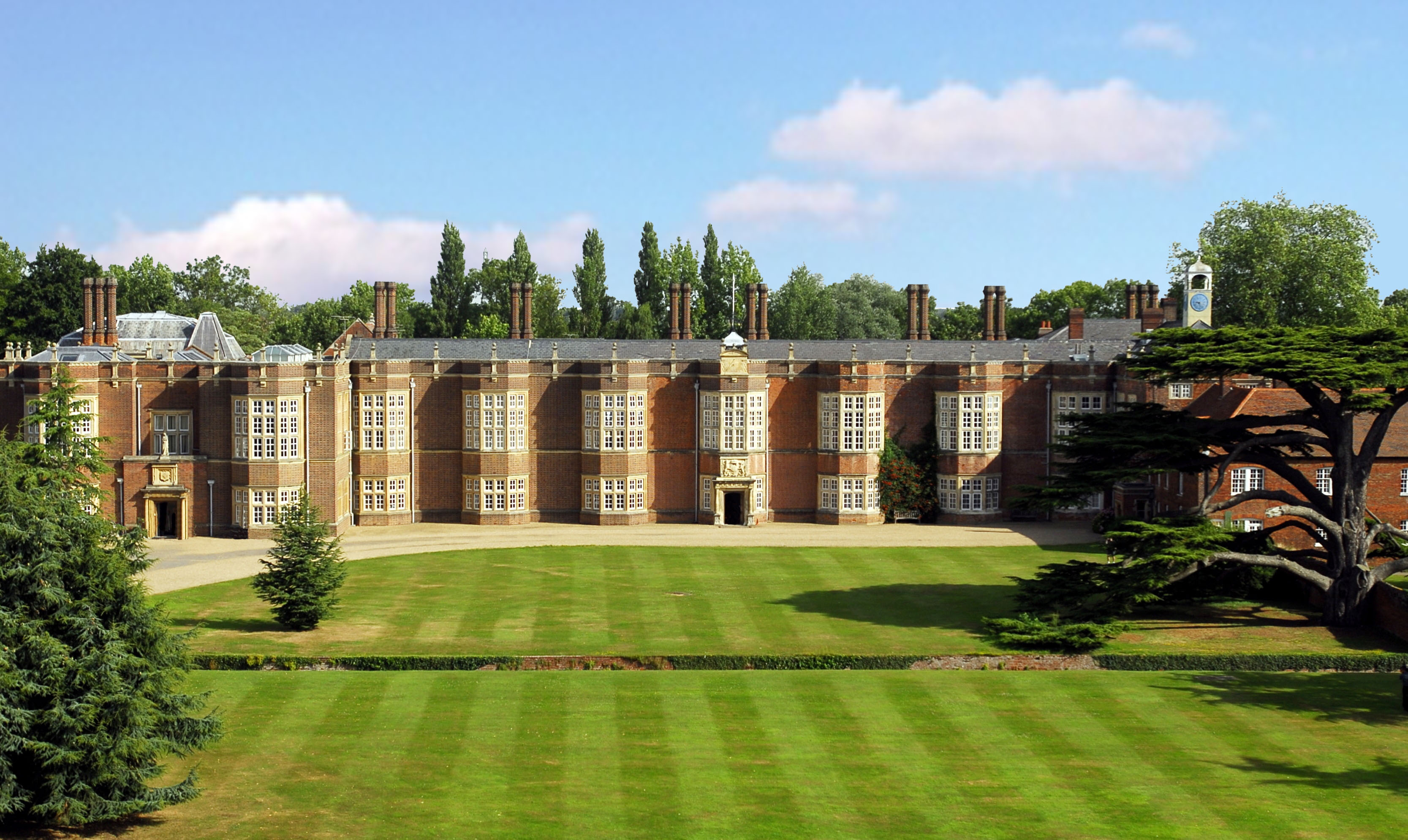
The surviving north wing, now occupied by New Hall School

== New Hall in the 18th century ==
Benjamin Hoare acquired the property in 1713, but it was in a poor state when purchased in 1737 by John Olmius, elevated to the peerage as Baron Waltham in 1762, who demolished and rebuilt much of the former palace. The north wing was left largely untouched and forms the present house. John was succeeded in 1762 by his son Drigue who died childless in 1787, aged 40, when New Hall devolved on his sister, the Honourable Elizabeth. However, she died the same year and her husband John Luttrell, later the Earl of Carhampton, took on the Olmius name; but, already owning the Carhampton estate including Painshill, he sold New Hall in 1798.

The purchasers in 1798 were the English nuns of the Order of the Holy Sepulchre, who opened a Catholic school there the following year. New Hall School remains a school to this day. The Royal Arms of Henry VIII are in the school chapel. In 2006 a book, New Hall and its School, was published by Tony Tuckwell.

The Beaulieu name is now remembered in the name of the nearby housing estate, Beaulieu Park, Boreham.

In February 2009, Channel 4's Time Team visited and excavated the grounds of the former palace. The special programme was broadcast on 13 April 2009. In the excavations, the team uncovered the chapel, west wing and the gatehouse.
