= Diamond school =

Type of independent school in the UK

Diamond school, diamond model, diamond shape and diamond structure are similar terms that apply to a type of independent school in the UK that combines both single-sex and coeducational teaching in the same organisation. Typically, the establishment will be all-through, often with a nursery setting, and boys and girls are taught together until the age of 11 and separately from 11 to 16, before returning to coeducation in a joint sixth form.

Diamond schools are often the product of the merger of a boys' and a girls' school, thus it is possible that at Key Stages 3 and 4 girls and boys can be taught separately on different sites. It is a common feature that boys and girls combine outside the classroom in activities for academic trips and visits and in some co-curricular activities, such as choirs, orchestras and the Duke of Edinburgh Award scheme. Other coeducational schools partially implement the structure, sometimes referring to it as the "diamond edge model" in which certain subjects, e.g., science, technology, engineering, and mathematics (STEM) are taught to gender-segregated sets or classes, typically drawn from KS3 and KS4 (Years 7 to 11).

The degree of gender separation was brought into focus in 2017 by the Al Hijrah judicial decision that total gender segregation in coeducational schools is illegal in England and Wales. Following this, in June 2018 the Department for Education published Gender separation in mixed schools, non-statutory guidance for all state and privately funded schools on separating classes by gender.

== Relevant UK schools ==
=== Diamond model adopted ===
- Berkhamsted School, Berkhamsted, Hertfordshire
- Brentwood School, Brentwood, Essex
- Bury Grammar School, Bury, Greater Manchester
- Claires Court, Maidenhead, Berkshire
- Clifton High School, Bristol
- Dame Allan's School, Newcastle upon Tyne
- Erskine Stewart's Melville Schools (The Mary Erskine School & Stewart's Melville College), Edinburgh
- Forest School, Walthamstow, London
- Haberdashers' Monmouth Schools (Monmouth School & Haberdashers' Monmouth School for Girls), Monmouth, Monmouthshire
- Ipswich High School, Ipswich, Suffolk
- Leweston School, Sherborne, Dorset
- New Hall School, Boreham, Chelmsford, Essex
- Oldham Hulme Grammar School, Oldham, Greater Manchester
- Stamford Endowed Schools (Stamford School & Stamford High School), Stamford, Lincolnshire
- The Grammar School at Leeds, Leeds, West Yorkshire
- The Stephen Perse Foundation, Cambridge, Cambridgeshire
- Westholme School, Blackburn, Lancashire

=== Moving towards diamond model ===
- Cranmore School (coeducational), West Horsley. Surrey, and St Teresa's School (girls only), Dorking, Surrey, merged in 2019 and are developing a diamond structure in which children are taught co-educationally from Nursery to Year 4 at Cranmore, and then separated, with girls at St Teresa's and boys at Cranmore until Year 11. From 2025 there will be a coeducational Sixth Form located at St Teresa's.
- Bedford Greenacre Independent School, Bedford, Bedfordshire was created in May 2021 by the merger of Rushmoor School (boys) and St Andrew's School (girls). The school is expected to relocate to a combined site in 2022.

=== Progressing from diamond model ===
- Teesside High School, Eaglescliffe, Durham, adopted the diamond model in 2005 but became fully coeducational in 2015.
- The Royal School in Haslemere, Surrey, previously girls only, adopted the diamond model when it began admitting boys in 2011. It became fully coeducational in 2019.
- The King's School, Macclesfield was diamond shaped from 1992 until its move in 2020 to a new campus on the outskirts of Macclesfield and Prestbury.
- Stamford School and Stamford High School merged in 2023, becoming coeducational.
