= NCAE =

NCAE may refer to:

- National College of Agricultural Engineering, a former agricultural college in Bedfordshire, England
- North Carolina Association of Educators, an educational organization in North Carolina
