= Mary Dennett (prior) =

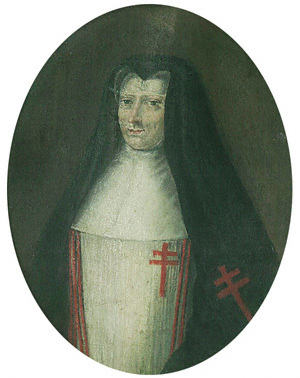
- portrait by an unknown person
- Born: 1730; Widnes
- Died: 12 July 1781 (aged 50–51); Liège
- Other name: name in religion was Christina
- Occupation: nun
- Known for: prioress of the Holy Sepulchre, Liège

Mary "Christina" Dennett (1730 – 12 July 1781) was a British prioress of the Canonesses Regular of the Holy Sepulchre in Liège from 1770 to 1781. New Hall School in Chelmsford credits Susan Hawley with founding their school, but it was Dennett who expanded the convent's school in Liege to have an international reputation in the 18th century, years before it moved to England in 1794.

== Life ==
Dennett was born in Appleton near Widnes in 1730. Her father Henry was a Protestant and her mother, Mary, was a Catholic. She was the last of their four children so when her father died when she was about five she was brought up as a catholic.

In 1746 she went to the convent of the Canonesses Regular of the Holy Sepulchre in Liege where her sister was already a nun. She was committed to a religious life and was said to have taken a vow of chastity when she was ten. The convent in Liege had been founded in 1642 by an English woman Dame Susan Hawley (Mother Mary of the Conception) who became the first prioress in 1656. Dennett was to young in 1746 to commit to becoming a nun so she was sent to gain an education at the school in Liege belonging to the Ursuline nuns. She became the sub prioress in 1769 and the sixth prioress of the Holy Sepulchre in 1770. That first year she turned her interest to the convent's school which had existed since 1651, but she now wanted to provide an education to Catholic girls that would compete with any school in England. The community was able to provide an education for the daughters of Catholic families under the Penal Laws She knew that girls would come to the convent, but they would not want to become nuns. Dennett was determined that these girls would be educated wives and mothers.

A new school building was started in 1772 and another was needed by 1776 when there were sixty girls living there and gaining an education. The school thrived and became well known. The school had always attracted English Catholic girls but the school's reputation meant that they attracted girls from many different countries. The school offered English, Maths and modern languages as well as wider ranging subjects including debating and double-entry book-keeping.

== Death and legacy ==
Dennett died in Liège in 1781. New Hall School in Chelmsford credits Susan Hawley with founding their school in 1642, but that school developed an international reputation under the management of Dennett. It is said that when the convent moved to England in 1794 to avoid the French Revolution, the reputation of the school meant that they found it difficult to leave. One the houses of New Hall School is called Dennett House.
