= Essex & Herts Air Ambulance =

English charity air ambulance

Essex & Herts Air Ambulance Trust
- Founded: 1997
- Type: Charitable organisation
- Location: Earls Colne, Essex North Weald Airfield, Essex
- Region served: East Anglia and London: (mainly Essex and Hertfordshire)
- Chief Executive Officer: Mark Jarman-Howe
- Aircraft operated: AgustaWestland AW169 MD902 Explorer
- Revenue: £19.5 million (2024)
- Staff: 81 (2024)
- Volunteers: 445 (2024)
- Website: www.ehaat.org

Essex & Herts Air Ambulance Trust (EHAAT) is a charity air ambulance service providing a free, life-saving helicopter emergency medical service (HEMS) for the critically ill and injured of Essex, Hertfordshire and surrounding areas.

The charity aims to save lives, reduce or prevent disability or suffering from critical illness and injury, by delivering a pre-hospital emergency medical service.

Since fundraising began in 1997, Essex & Herts Air Ambulance has flown over 20,000 missions, and is deployed, on average, six times per day. The helicopters and rapid response vehicles (RRV) are based at Earls Colne Airfield and North Weald Airfield.

== History ==
The Essex Air Ambulance Charity was established and began fundraising in 1997, launching as a dual-paramedic and single-pilot service from New Hall School in Boreham in July 1998. In 1999, the service began operating seven days a week, during daylight hours, as opposed to the previous five-day service.

In 2003, the Essex Air Ambulance was upgraded to a Eurocopter EC135 T2.

In April 2007, the Essex Air Ambulance charity became known as the Essex & Herts Air Ambulance Trust, responsible for both the Essex and the new Hertfordshire air ambulance services. The Hertfordshire air ambulance was introduced on 5 November 2008. With the launch of the Hertfordshire aircraft, Essex's operational colour stayed as yellow and Hertfordshire gained red – both of which featured on the helicopters G-EHAA and G-HAAT.

Doctors were introduced to the Essex Air Ambulance Air crew in July 2008. This doctor/critical care paramedic model is used on both aircraft at all times. Pre-hospital care doctors could then work alongside specially trained critical care paramedics from the EEAST to optimise patient outcome. Doctors are employed by Mid Essex Hospital NHS Trust, on behalf of EHAAT – except for a team of consultants, who are seconded from some of their hospital work. Paramedics are provided by EEAST. All paramedics are trained to critical care qualification, while doctors have a sub-speciality in Pre-hospital emergency medicine. The team of doctors also included a small number of consultants.

In 2011, The Essex Air Ambulance's operational base moved from Boreham to Earls Colne Airfield and the charity head office and Essex fundraising team moved to Earls Colne Business Park in March 2015.

In March 2017, to coincide with the charity's 20 year anniversary, a new brand was launched which unified Essex and Hertfordshire's previously separate identities to signify the united future of the charity.

From October 2019, the critical care team became available 24 hours a day, 365 days a year. This was the first time in the charity's 21-year history that was able to provide a fully 24/7 aeromedical service to the people of Essex, Hertfordshire and the surrounding areas

== Service ==
Essex & Herts Air Ambulance (EHAAT) provides Helicopter Emergency Medical Service (HEMS) seven days a week, from 7 am until 8 pm. The charity operates two AgustaWestland AW169 helicopters, one based at Earls Colne airfield and one at North Weald airfield.

During the hours of darkness an EHAAT Rapid Response Vehicle (RRV) based at North Weald is used from 7:30 pm to 7:30 am. RRVs are also operational at Earls Colne for the hours where the aircraft is unable to fly in bad weather or maintenance.

EHAAT works in partnership with the East of England Ambulance Service (EEAST) who monitor incoming 999 calls and, according to clinical need, dispatch the critical care team from the critical care desk based in the emergency operation centre (EOC) at Broomfield Hospital. The desk is staffed by a critical care paramedic and a dispatcher to ensure appropriate tasking.

The helicopters take off within two minutes of the emergency call being received at the airbase. The helicopter based at Earls Colne can reach the farthest point in Essex in less than 20 minutes and the helicopter based at North Weald can reach the farthest point in Hertfordshire in less than 15 minutes. The helicopters and RRVs can also carry medical equipment and drugs, much of which will not be found on standard land ambulances – along with the specially trained doctor in pre-hospital emergency medicine, who can perform life-saving open heart surgery and general anaesthesia at the roadside.

=== Crew composition ===
Each HEMS team consists of a pilot and co-pilot, a pre-hospital care doctor and a critical care paramedic, who can quickly attend the scene of an incident with life-saving support equipment to deliver advanced clinical care that is normally only found in the hospital emergency department. The dual-pilot scheme was introduced in 2016 to enhance patient care, as previously the paramedic would act as navigator, aiding the pilot.

== Fleet ==
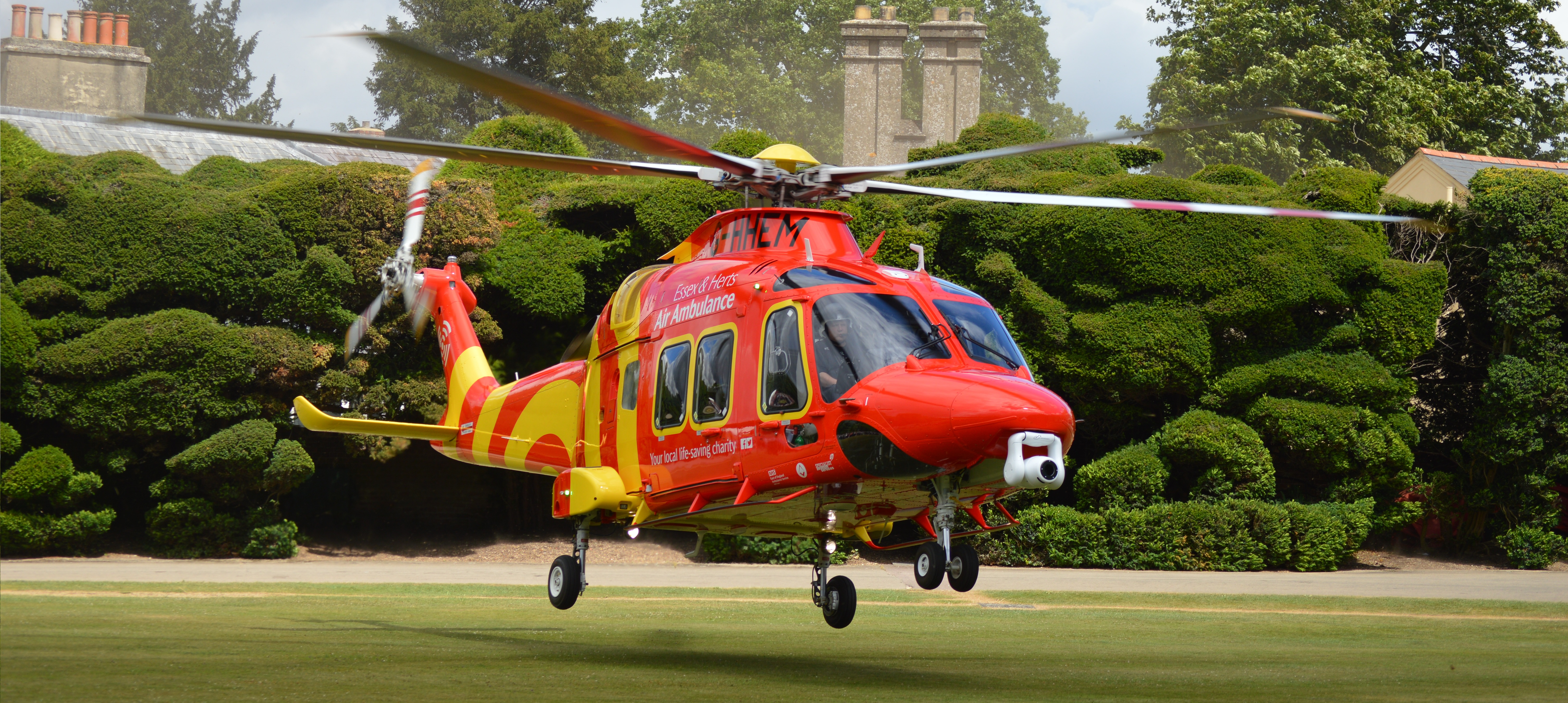
G-HHEM landing at its launch event in 2017.

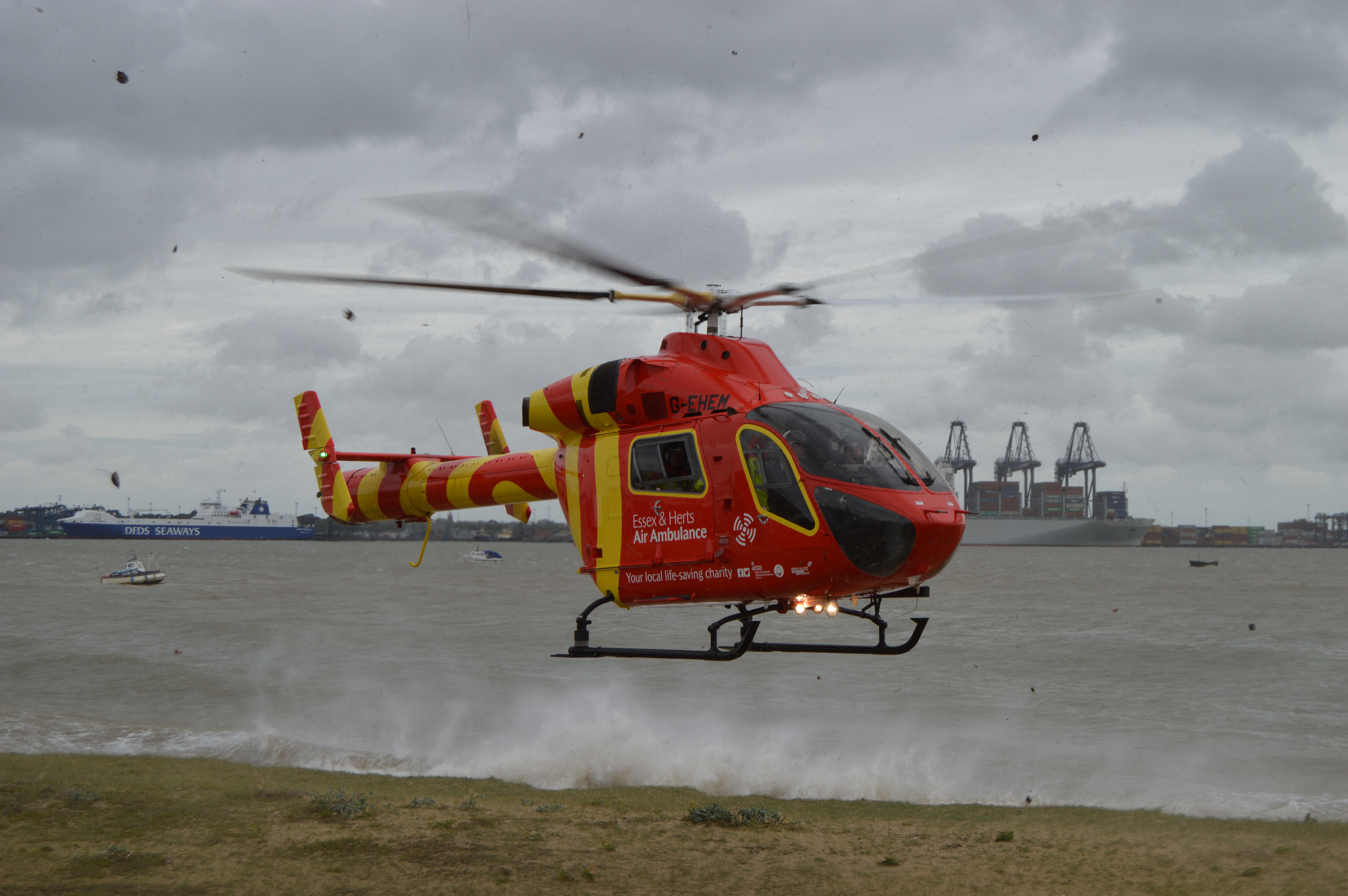
G-EHEM landing in Harwich, Essex at the Charity's Motorcycle Run event.

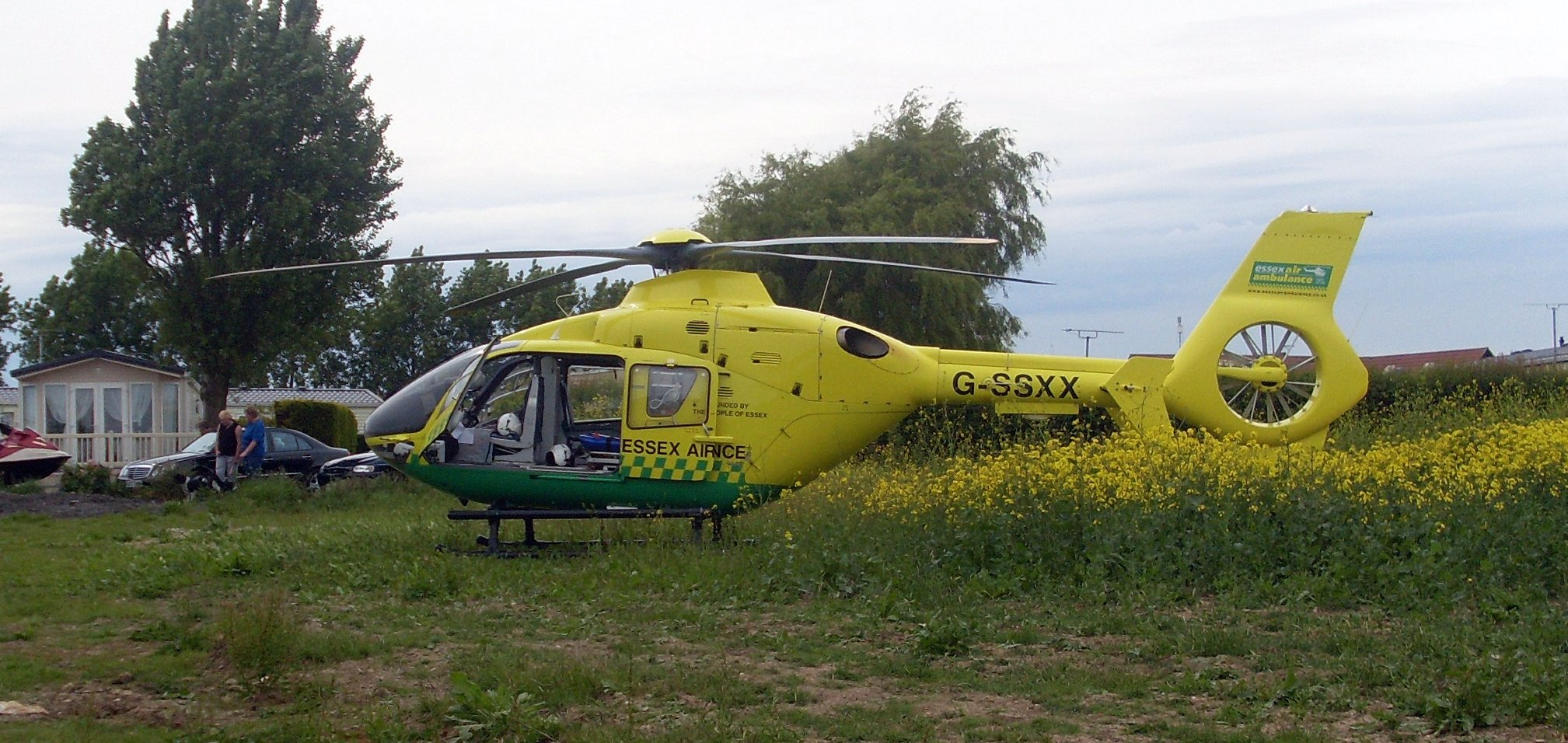
G-SSXX: operated between 2003 and 2010

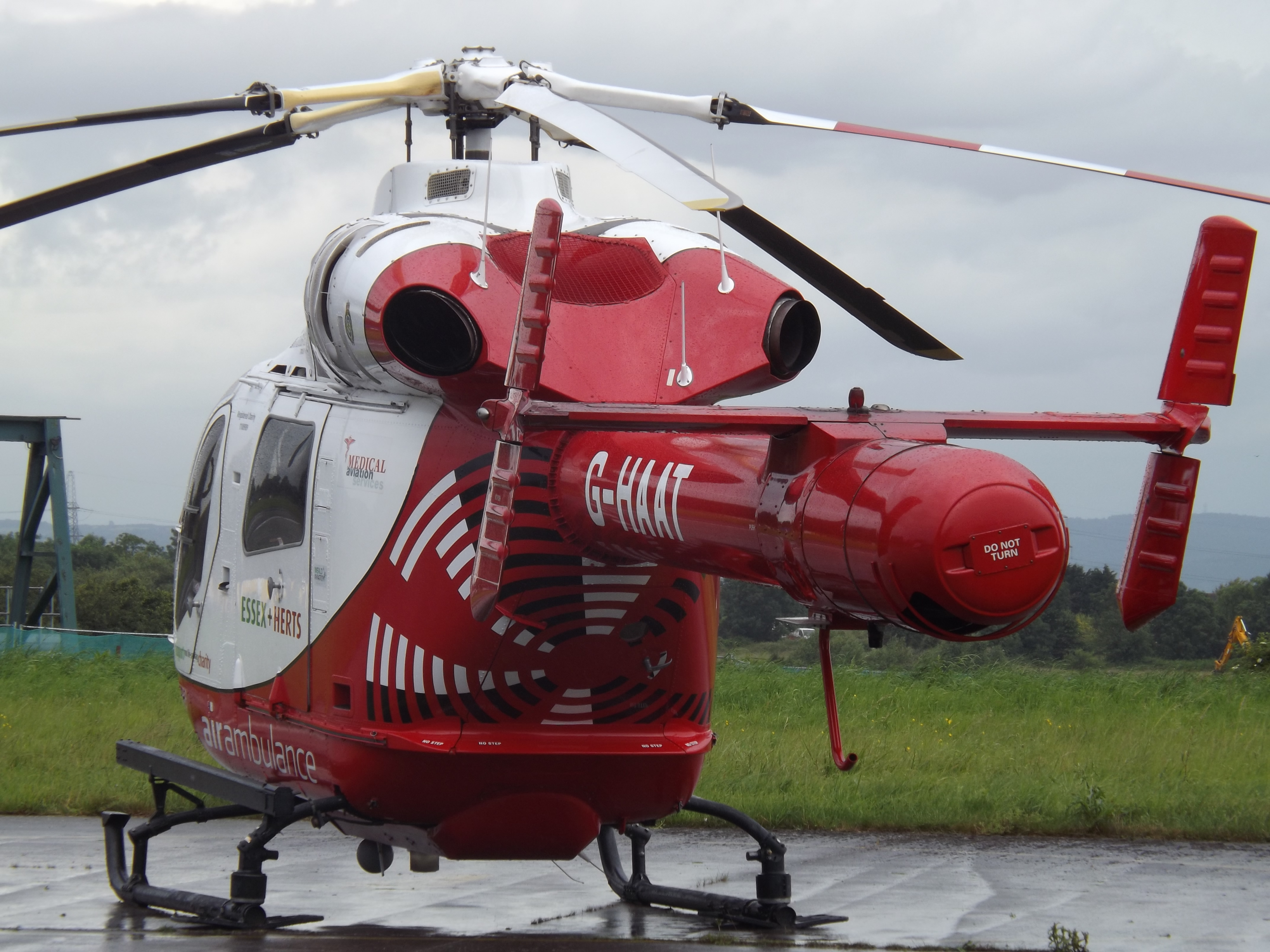
G-HAAT: operated between 2008 and 2017

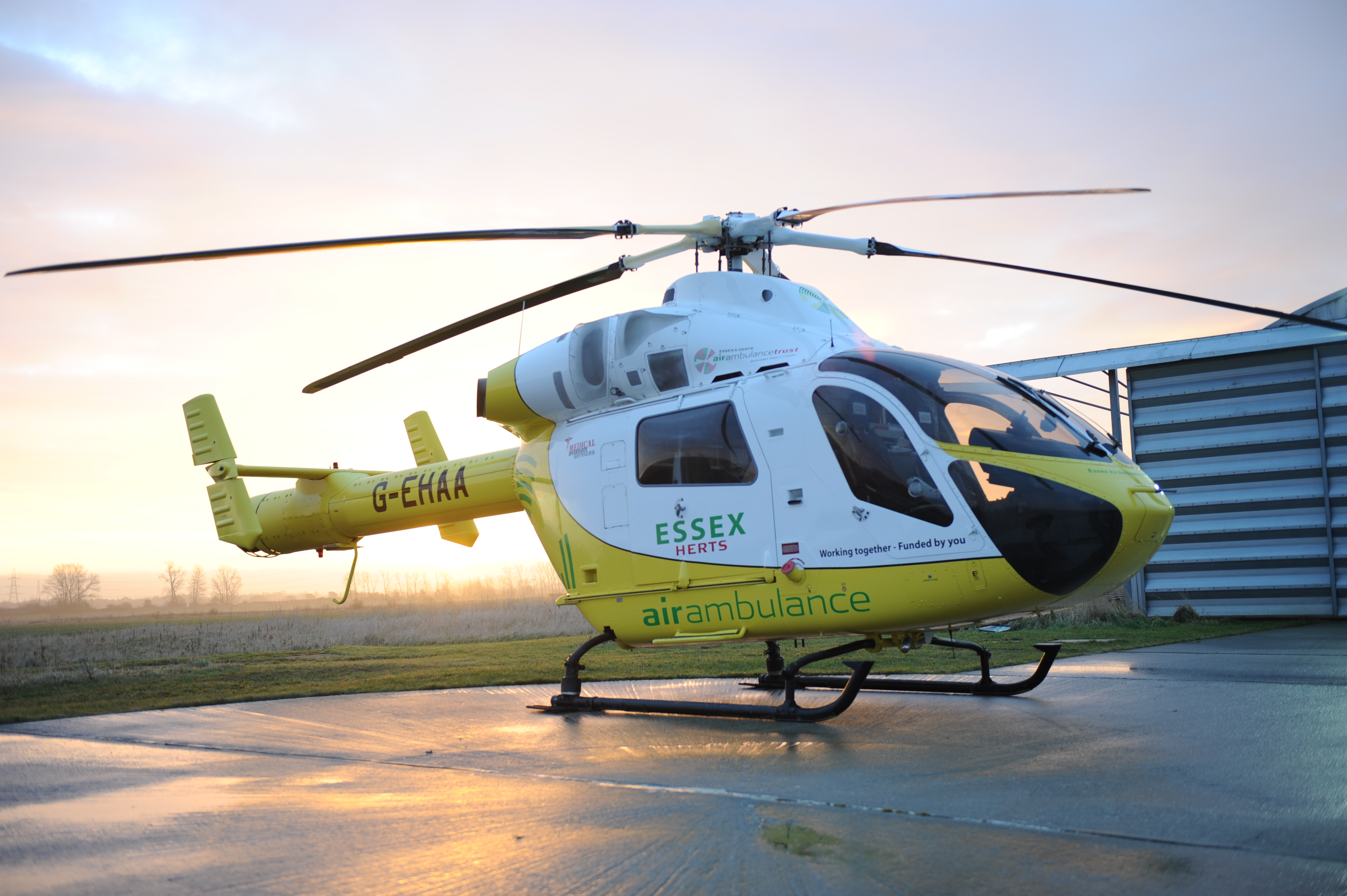
G-EHAA: operated between 2010 and 2017

Essex & Herts Air Ambulance utilises two helicopters and four rapid response cars (RRV) to transport their pre-hospital care teams. Both current helicopters entered service in August 2017. The helicopters have the ability to access remote parts of Essex and Hertfordshire quickly, unaffected by road traffic congestions. The helicopters can also reach areas inaccessible to land vehicles including woods, beaches, docks and golf courses.

=== G-HHEM – AW169 ===
In March 2016, EHAAT signed a contract with aircraft operator, Specialist Aviation Services (SAS) to secure the purchase and operation of an AgustaWestland AW169, callsign Helimed 55, which is based at North Weald, Essex. This is the first aircraft the charity has purchased. It became operational in August 2017.

=== G-EHAT – AW169 ===
In 2024, EHAAT finalised the purchase of G-EHAT, a second AgustaWestland AW169 to replace G-EHEM MD 902 Explorer and it was publicly launched in July 2024. Its callsign is Helimed 07 and it is based at Earls Colne, Essex.

=== Rapid response vehicles ===
Each base has two Volvo XC90 RRVs for the medical crew to operate from when helicopters are offline in darkness and bad weather. They are hybrid lower-emission vehicles and have four-wheel-drive capability to allow the team to reach the patient in adverse weather conditions in remote locations.

=== Past fleet ===
G-ESAM was a MBB Bo 105, operated in Essex between 1998 and 2003. It was leased from Bond Helicopters.

G-SSXX, a Eurocopter EC135, operated from May 2003 until 2010. It was leased from Bond Helicopters.

In 2008, the first Hertfordshire aircraft launched, an MD 902 Explorer, which was leased from SAS.

In 2010, in line with the new aircraft for Hertfordshire, Essex's aircraft was upgraded to an MD 902 Explorer, G-EHAA, which was leased from SAS.

Previously the trust operated a single RRV. This was a BMW X3, which has been re-liveried into a charity advertisement vehicle, advertising the work the charity does.

In 2024, MD 902 Explorer G-EHEM was replaced by G-EHAT, a second AgustaWestland AW169.

== Finances ==
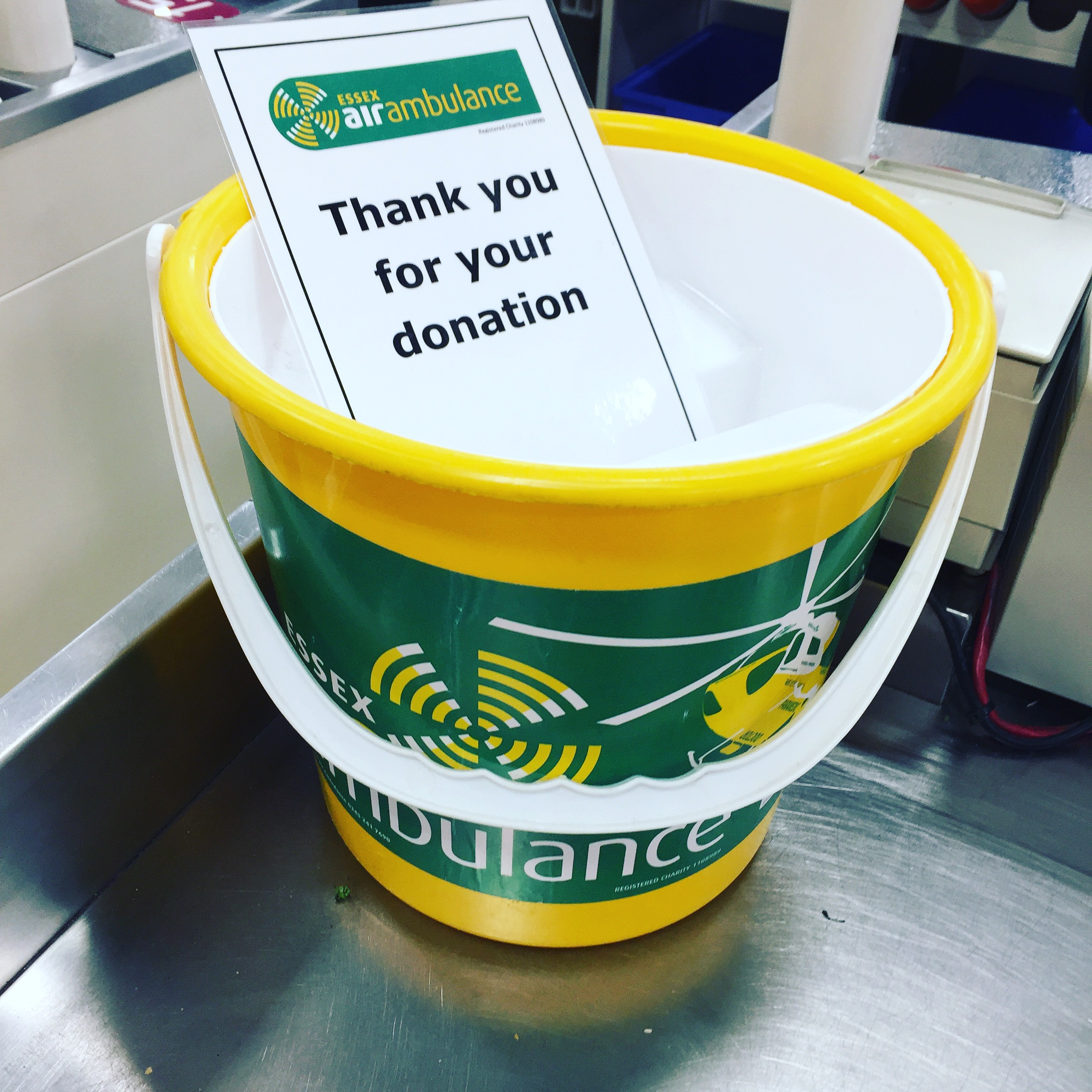
An Essex Air Ambulance collecting bucket for donations of coins or banknotes, seen in 2016

In the year ended March 2024, EHAAT's income was £19.5 million, including £5,000 of government grants, against expenditure of £15.7M, of which £10M (64%) was spent on delivering the emergency service.

== See also ==
- Air ambulances in the United Kingdom
