= Felicity Landon =

English journalist

- Education: New Hall School
- Alma mater: Harlow College
- Occupation: Journalist
- Employer(s): Previously East Anglian Daily Times, now freelance.
- Known for: Feature writing Editing; Reporting

Felicity Landon is a British freelance journalist specialising in global maritime, industry and logistics. She is based near Stowmarket, in Suffolk. Landon has worked as a feature writer, reporter, columnist and editor in the maritime sector for 35 years. She has received a number of awards from the Seahorse Freight Association, including Journalist of the Year in 2023.

== Early life ==
Landon grew up in Essex, where she attended New Hall School, near Chelmsford. She went on to study journalism at Harlow College.

== Career ==
Landon worked for the East Anglian Daily Times before becoming a freelance journalist. She has worked in the maritime sector since 1990, writing for publications such as Port Strategy, Seatrade Maritime, Shipping Network, Heavy Lift & Project Forwarding International, Lloyd's List and Industry Europe. Landon has also written company history books, including a commemorative book to celebrate the centenary of Dunlop Aircraft Tyres, a history of e2v and a history of the international law firm Stephenson Harwood.

== Awards ==
Landon has received the following awards from the Seahorse Freight Association (Seahorse Club):

- Journalist of the Year 2023
- Supply Chain Journalist of the Year 2023
- Maritime Journalist of the Year 2022
- Innovation Journalist of the Year 2017
- Supply Chain Journalist of the Year 2012

She has also been named runner-up for: ESG (environmental, social and governance) Journalist of the Year 2024; Journalist of the Year 2018; Journalism on Innovation Award 2016; Supply Chain Journalist of the Year 2016; Journalist of the Year 2009
