= New Hall School =

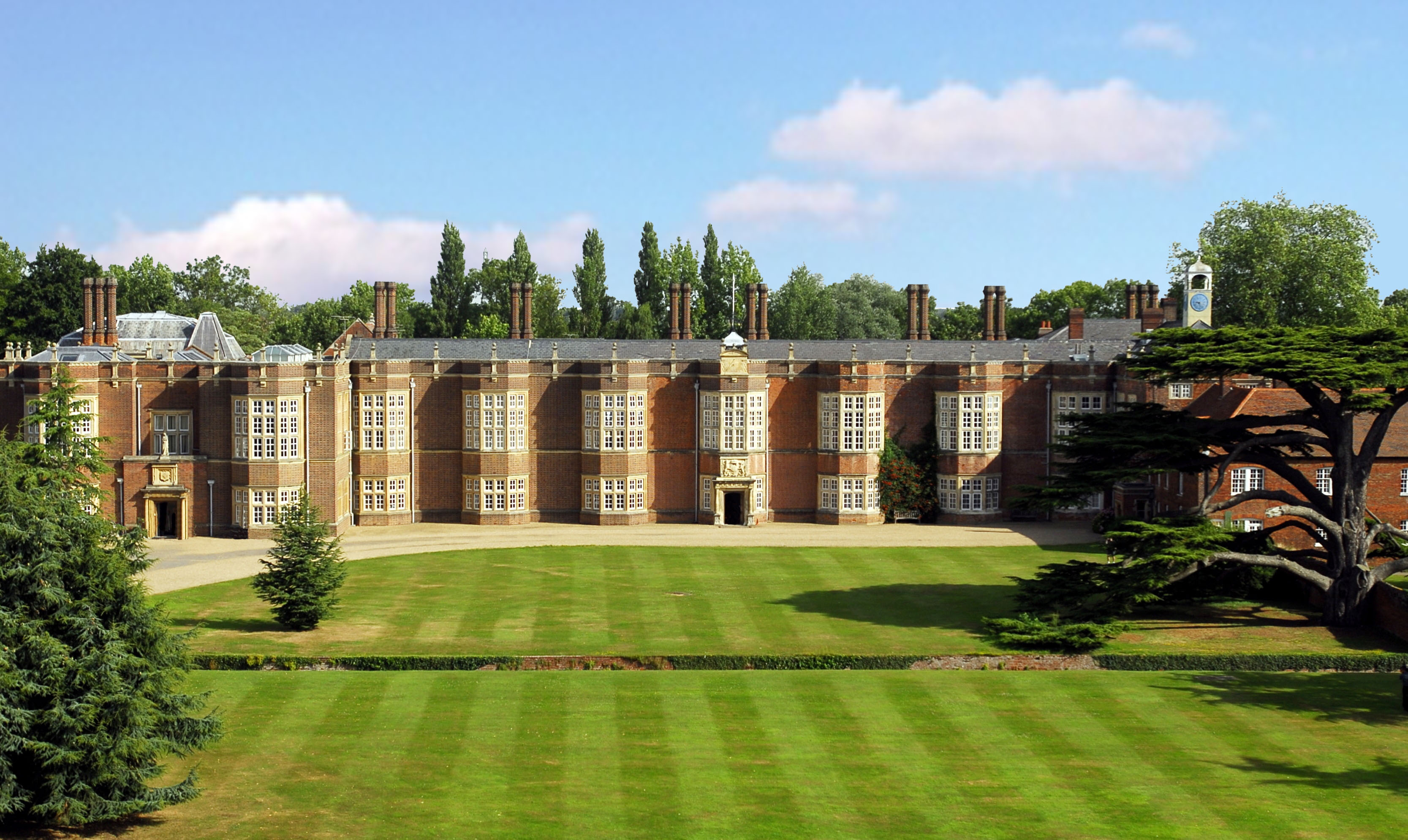
- New Hall School in 2014

Location
- The Avenue; Chelmsford, Essex, CM3 3HS; England; 51°45′47″N 0°30′45″E

Information
- Type: Public school Private school Boarding school Day School
- Motto: The Best Start in Life
- Religious affiliation: Roman Catholic
- Established: 1642 (in Belgium); 1799 (current school)
- Department for Education URN: 115387 Tables
- Chair of Governors: Philip Wilson
- Principal: Katherine Jeffrey
- Gender: Co-educational
- Age: 1 to 19
- Enrolment: 1400
- Publication: The Beaulieu Bulletin
- Former pupils: Old Fishes
- Website: newhallschool.co.uk

New Hall School is a Catholic co-educational private boarding and day school for girls and boys aged 1-19 in the village of Boreham near Chelmsford, Essex, England. It was founded in 1642 in the Low Countries, now Belgium, by sisters of the Catholic order Canonesses of the Holy Sepulchre and moved to its current location, the former Tudor Palace of Beaulieu in Essex, in 1799. It is the only Catholic Independent school in the Brentwood diocese, and one of the oldest and largest British schools in the country.

The school operates the "diamond" model format. Up until the end of Year 6 and in the Sixth Form, the children are taught in co-educational classes. In years 7 to 11, students are taught in single sex classes. The school is a member of the Catholic Independent Schools Conference and the ISA, and the principal is a member of the Headmasters' and Headmistresses' Conference.

New Hall is set within 180 acres of heritage grounds, and is just 35 minutes from Central London by train, with Beaulieu Park Station located at the end of the School's tree-lined Avenue.

== History ==
The school was founded in Liège, now part of Belgium in 1642 by Susan Hawley, who also formed the English Community of the Canonesses Regular of the Holy Sepulchre. The founding Religious Order, the Canonesses Regular of the Holy Sepulchre, is one of the most ancient in the Church and was established in Europe long before the English Religious Community was founded in 1642. The school expanded considerably in size and scope from 1770 under the leadership of Mary Dennett. The school began to offer a Catholic education to girls who were denied this in England in the Post-Protestant Reformation period and to girls from other countries too. In 1794, the French Revolutionary Wars forced the nuns to leave the Low Countries. The school reopened on its present site in 1799.

In 1994, the Preparatory Divisions were re-established on the campus at New Hall. Opening with 40 pupils, the school grew rapidly over the following years. In 1995, the Preparatory Divisions welcomed its first boarders and the boarding programme was later extended to boys as well.

From 1642 to 2001, all New Hall School headmistresses were canonesses of the Holy Sepulchre, followed by the appointment of Mrs Katherine Jeffrey as Principal, from 1 January 2002. In April 2005, the administration made a landmark decision to go fully co-educational, ending more than 360 years of single-sex education. The announcement was made that the Senior Divisions would be embarking on a period of further expansion, with the establishment of a separate Boys' Division (11–16) and a co-educational Sixth Form. The Senior Divisions now accepts boys throughout the 11–19 age range, and there are two boys' boarding houses fully established, in addition to the two girls' boarding houses.

The move towards co-education using the "diamond model" has proved extremely successful. New Hall was commended by judges at the 2011 Independent School Awards for the "ambitious and pioneering move" and won the award for "outstanding strategic initiative". In 2016 New Hall was voted TES Independent School of the Year.

The New Hall School Trust (NHST) was established as a new registered charity (1110286) and limited company in 2005. The principal objective of the NHST, as set out in the Memorandum and Articles, is ‘to advance the Roman Catholic religion by the conduct of a Roman Catholic School’. In 2012 New Hall was invited to become the first independent school in the country to sponsor a state primary school that was seeking to become an Academy under the new Government scheme. The new academy formally opened in September 2013, forming the New Hall Multi Academy Trust (NHMAT), a partnership between New Hall School and Messing Primary School.

In 2019, New Hall opened a Nursery for children aged one to four.

In 2023, New Hall acquired a 70-acre site, New Hall Park Farm, which forms part of the reinstatement of New Hall's Equestrian Centre. The School also has a Learn-to-Ride Centre on site, with an outdoor arena and equestrian simulators. The School's Centre for the Natural Sciences includes an animal farm, fruit farm and saltwater aquarium.

In 2024, New Hall acquired Boreham House. This is planned to be the new home of New Hall's Preparatory Divisions, subject to planning consents. Boreham House is a Grade I listed property, set in 35-acres of countryside.

=== Buildings ===
Sir Thomas Boleyn inherited New Hall from his father Sir William in the late 1400s and in 1517, the estate was acquired by King Henry VIII, who greatly enlarged and enhanced the building and called it Beaulieu. The Royal Arms of Henry VIII are now to be seen in the school Chapel. For many years the home of Mary Tudor, New Hall was subsequently granted to the Earl of Sussex by Queen Elizabeth I. Oliver Cromwell later procured the estate for 5 shillings. In 2009,Time Team filmed at New Hall for their documentary, Henry VIII's Lost Palaces.

Having fallen into disrepair and been somewhat pillaged, the house was bought by a Dutch trader John Olmius in 1738 who refashioned the north wing as a self-contained house with a new entrance and bay windows, interior plasterwork and panelling. Under the reign of George III, he became the 1st Baron Waltham of Philpstown.

== Houses ==
There are six vertical houses named after figures venerated in the Catholic church:

- Acutis House
- Augustine House
- Bahkita House
- Miki House
- Romero House
- Teresa House

The Preparatory Divisions Houses are named after the Four Evangelists, the saints who wrote the Four Gospels:

- St Matthew (Red)
- St Mark (Yellow)
- St Luke (Green)
- St John (Blue)

The Boarding Houses are named as follows:

- Earle Wing, Petre House
- Hawley House
- Petre House
- Dennett House
- Campion House

== Academic ==
New Hall has a strong academic record and regularly tops the exam results table for Essex county. In the 2021 A Levels, it achieved a 97% pass rate at grades A*-B and 75% at A*/A. At GCSE, 79% of grades were 7+ (A*/A).

== Pastoral care ==
Pupils are required to attend regular chapel services. Practising Catholic pupils may choose to actively participate in spiritual activities such as Bible studies and the annual pilgrimage to Lourdes. The school chapel runs weekly Sunday mass which is open to the public and serves the Parish of St Augustine of Canterbury, Springfield. Pupils and staff often serve as musicians, choristers, altar servers, sacristans and readers.

== Co-curricular activities ==
=== Sport ===
Students compete at county, regional, national and international level in a wide range of sports and have met with success. In recent years, there has been a significant investment in the sports facilities on campus. The first-class provision now includes: The Waltham Centre 25m 6-lane indoor swimming pool; a national standard athletics track and floodlit Astroturf; 10 floodlit tennis/netball courts; two sports halls; Parsons Hall dance studio; junior and senior cricket wickets and indoor training nets; hockey, rugby and football pitches. New Hall also has well-established links with a local riding school and a golf club.

The more popular sports are cricket, hockey, netball, rugby, and tennis. There is a wide variety of other sports, including aerobics & pilates, athletics, badminton, basketball, cross country, fencing, football, golf, equitation, swimming, volleyball and triathlon.

== Past headmistresses and principals ==
At Liege and then in England it can be assumed that the Prioress was also in charge of the school. At some unknown stage a First Mistress became a quasi-Headmistress in the school under the Prioress. The term headmistress was first used in 1942 and the term principal from 2005.

From	Till	Name
1942	1957	Sister Margaret Helen Terney
1957	1963	Sister Mary Ignatius Brown
1963	1986	Sister Mary Francis Wood
1986	1997	Sister Margaret Mary Horton
1997	2001	Sister Ann-Marie Brister
2001	Now	Katherine Jeffrey

== Former pupils ==
Former pupils are known as "Old Fishes" or "New Hallians".

- Christiane Amanpour, chief international correspondent for CNN
- Cindy Buxton, wildlife film-maker
- Joanna Scanlan, actor and writer
- Leonora Carrington, surrealist artist
- Anya Hindmarch, fashion accessories designer
- Denise Holt, diplomat
- Amber Rudd, British politician, former Home Secretary
- Emma Gilbey Keller, author and journalist
- Sarah Ferguson, journalist, host of Australian Broadcasting Corporation's 7.30
- Felicity Landon, freelance journalist
- Amanda Stretton, racing driver and motoring journalist
- Virginia Maskell, English actress
- Gina Rippon, professor of cognitive neuroimaging and author
- Rose Glass, film & TV writer/ director
- Dom Morris, Saracens rugby player
- Tomiwa Agbongbon, Leicester Tigers rugby player

== Notable staff ==
- Nasser Hussain, cricket
- Matilda Callaghan, cricket

== See also ==
- New Hall School official website
- New Hall School Twitter Site
- Canonesses of the Holy Sepulchre
- Time Team Special on New Hall
