= Port Strategy =

British shipping port-related magazine

Port Strategy is a shipping port-related magazine published by Mercator Media, a specialist maritime publisher based in Fareham on the UK’s South Coast. As well as port news, Port Strategy covers cargo, equipment, insurance, logistics, global trade and law.

Described as “the leading magazine for Port Executives” and a magazine that “decision-makers around the world have access to”, Port Strategy aims to cover every hot spot for port development and investment from both the developed and emerging world. Each issue has a combination of news, in-depth features, and unique opinion targeted to meet the information needs of government strategists, port executives, marine terminal operators and port users.

The magazine launched its online product in 2008, publishes port-related podcasts through a partnership with Coracle, and also runs news headline entries through Twitter.

The magazine was registered with ABC for a certified circulation figure on 14 July 2008. The November 2009 audited issue had an ABC certified circulation of 6,030, of which 2,001 went to Europe, 1,469 headed to SouthEast Asia and 1,021 were sent to the Americas.

== History ==
Port Strategy was launched in June 2003 to fill a gap in the port development media market after the demise of Port Development International, which was originally published by Mundy Perry Ltd, and taken over by Euromoney in 1998. PDI ceased publication in 2002. Mike Mundy, part of the PDI founding partnership, is editorial director of Port Strategy.

== Personnel ==
At 30 September 2015, senior staff included:

- Editorial Director: Mike Mundy
- Editor: Carly Fields
- News Editor: Anne-Marie Causer
- Publisher: Andrew Webster

Contributors to the Magazine include Felicity Landon, Peter de Langen, Martin Rushmere, Barry Cross, Ben Hackett and Barry Parker. Port Strategy also has correspondents in 5 countries.
