= HMS Boreham =

Minesweeper of the Royal Navy

History

United Kingdom
- Name: HMS Boreham
- Namesake: Boreham
- Builder: Brooke Marine
- Launched: 21 October 1952
- Completed: 16 October 1953
- Fate: transferred to Malaysia, 5 March 1966

Malaysia
- Name: KD Jerong
- Acquired: 5 March 1966
- Fate: broken up, 1970

General characteristics
- Class & type: Ham-class minesweeper
- Displacement: 120 long tons (122 t) standard; 164 long tons (167 t) full load
- Length: 100 ft (30 m) p/p; 106 ft 6 in (32.46 m) o/a
- Beam: 21 ft 4 in (6.50 m)
- Draught: 5 ft 6 in (1.68 m)
- Propulsion: 2 shaft Paxman 12YHAXM diesels; 1,100 bhp (820 kW)
- Speed: 14 knots (16 mph; 26 km/h)
- Complement: 2 officers, 13 ratings
- Armament: 1 × Bofors 40 mm L/60 gun or Oerlikon 20 mm cannon
- Notes: Pennant number(s): M2610 / IMS10

HMS Boreham was one of 93 ships of the Ham-class of inshore minesweepers.

Their names were all chosen from villages ending in -ham. The minesweeper was named after Boreham in Essex.
