= Harlow College =

Further education college in England

Location
- Velizy Avenue; Harlow, Essex, CM20 3EZ; England; 51.77047°N 0.09918°E

Information
- Type: further education college
- Established: 1984; 42 years ago
- Local authority: Essex
- Department for Education URN: 130676 Tables
- Principal: Karen Spencer
- Gender: co-educational
- Age: 16+
- Enrolment: 5,900 (2018)
- Website: www.harlow-college.ac.uk

Harlow College is a further education college in Harlow, Essex, England. This medium-sized college has 5,900 students as of 2018 of which 2,585 are on 16-19 programmes and 2,000 are on adult educational programmes. Its main campus is in the town, while recently an additional site has been built and opened at London Stansted Airport, the first of its kind at a major UK airport. Harlow College's Principal and Chief Executive is Karen Spencer.

The current college was established in 1984 as a tertiary college following reorganisation of post-16 education in the town. It replaced the former Harlow Technical College.

The college is distinguished by its success rates and its Journalism Centre, which it has operated since 1964.

== Journalism centre ==
Formed in 1964, Harlow College's Journalism Centre is a journalism training centre, with courses accredited through the National Council for the Training of Journalists (NCTJ) and the Periodical Training Council (PTC). The centre boasts strong links with Anglia Ruskin University in Cambridge, through a BA Hons journalism degree.

The journalism students studying at BTEC level are now able to use the new £9m University Centre Harlow facilities, which is part of Anglia Ruskin University.

The current college was predated by a boys' boarding school of the same name, originally dating from 1862, which was situated in Old Harlow.

== The college today ==
The college has three divisions:

- Corporate services
- Student-focused provision: the Sixth Form, the Vocational Studies Academy.
- Employer-focused provision: the Business & Technology Academy, The Creative Arts Academy, The Employer Response Unit.

In 2006/06, the college enrolled about 2,070 learners aged 16–18 and about 3,040 adult learners, with an income of around £20m.

== Notable alumni ==
- John Earls - music journalist and broadcaster.
- Phil Hall - Former editor-in-chief of Hello!
- Charlie Hedges - BBC Radio 1 DJ.
- Mark Knopfler - musician, songwriter, composer, producer.
- Steve Lamacq - DJ.
- Felicity Landon - journalist.
- Kelvin Mackenzie - former editor of The Sun.
- Piers Morgan - television presenter and journalist.
- Sophy Ridge - Sky News presenter.
- John Stapleton - Former GMTV, Watchdog, Panorama and Newsnight presenter.
- Norman Watt-Roy - bassist.
- Jaime Winstone - actress.

== The original 'Harlow College' 1862-1965 ==
The college was opened by the Reverend Charles Miller on 29 May 1862, in Old Harlow. In the early 20th century it was a well-known school with Ernest Percival Horsey as its head. When the Old Harlow area was redeveloped the school was forced to close in 1965.

=== Headmasters of Harlow College ===
- 29 May 1862: Opened by Charles Miller
- 1889 - 1903: Lyndhurst Burton Towne
- 1904 - 1935: Ernest Percival Horsey
- 1935 - 1936: ? Miller
- 1936 - 1962: Kenneth L. Dames
- 1962 - 1965: Roy C. Purgavie

=== Notable alumni ===
- Gordon de Lisle Lee - Clarenceux King of Arms, 1862–1927.
- Herbert Marshall - actor, 1890–1966.
- George Fellowes Prynne - church designer, 1853–1927.
