= Claires Court School =

Private school in Maidenhead, Berkshire, England

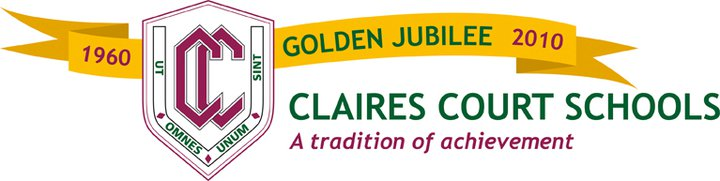

Location
- 1 College Avenue; Maidenhead, Berkshire, SL6 6AW; England; 51.5244°N 0.7317°W

Information
- Type: Private day school
- Established: 1960
- Local authority: Windsor and Maidenhead Borough Council
- Department for Education URN: 110153 Tables
- Principals and Proprietors: James and Hugh Wilding
- Age range: 2–18
- Enrolment: 1,055 (2019)
- Capacity: 1,190
- Website: www.clairescourt.com

Claires Court School is a 2–18 all-through private day school and sixth form in Maidenhead, Berkshire, England. As one of a small number of diamond schools located in the United Kingdom, it is unique in that while its nursery and sixth form are mixed, Juniors (primary) and Seniors (secondary) are single-sex, though as of 2023, the Juniors will begin to merge into fully coed over the course of the next six years.

== History ==
Founded in 1960 by David and Josephine Wilding, as a day and boarding school for boys aged 6+ to 13, Claires Court grew quickly to 180 pupils by 1970. Ridgeway, originally acquired in 1964 to provide full and weekly boarding accommodation, was converted to be the junior school in 1975 when the age range at the Ray Mill Road East site was extended to 16 year-olds. By 1980 the school roll was approximately 280.

Having joined the teaching staff in September 1975, their son James became Master in charge of the Senior School in January 1981; the previous August the family business had been joined by Hugh as Bursar. In 1993, the Wildings acquired Maidenhead College, an independent day school for girls, formerly known as the Convent of the Nativity. In January 2017, the school continues on three sites; a co-ed Nursery leads to separate single sex boys and girls sections providing education to 16+, the co-ed Sixth form, now in its 25th year, completes the diamond.

== Sport ==
In December 2017, Claires Court under 13 girls won the ISA London West Netball Tournament.

=== Rowing ===
The School has a very successful rowing club called the Claires Court School Boat Club.

== Facilities ==
On 28 November 2013 and 23 June 2016 the local Maidenhead Advertiser covered plans to coalesce the existing three sites onto that of the Junior Boys school. The converged site had a planned capacity of just under 1200 students. On 4 January 2018 the Maidenhead Advertiser reported that the school had applied for planning permission for the new campus. On 28 August 2019, at a meeting of the Planning Committee, RBWM councillors officially and near unanimously rejected the applications after detailed objections from local residents, who had campaigned for over three years to prevent the loss of greenbelt and against the detrimental environmental and infrastructure effects cited by the council members as the reasons for refusal. The school appealed the decision, but on 21 December 2020 the appeal for the school campus and Hockey club infrastructure was rejected.

== Notable former pupils ==
Notable alumni include:
Farah Zeynep Abdullah - Actress
Hunter Abbott - Racing Driver
Ali Bastian- Actress
Eleanor Wood - Author
Ellie Rayer - Hockey Player
Christian Colson - Film Producer
Chris Cracknell - Rugby Player
Simon Dennis - Rower
Michael Geoghegan - Businessman
Amber Hill - Olympian Sports Shooter
Nick Kennedy - Rugby Player
Nils Mordt - Rugby Player
James (Lord) O'Shaughnessy - Politician
Mark Richardson - Sprinter
Ben Sneesby Alpine Skier

== Current status ==
As at the 2017 Annual School Census, 130 teachers and 50 assistants have charge of 1090 pupils, supported by a further 150 ancillary staff. The school has a successful athletics program, and several students have become national champions.
