= Boreham House =

Grade I listed house in the United Kingdom

Coordinates: 51.75379°N 0.52848°E

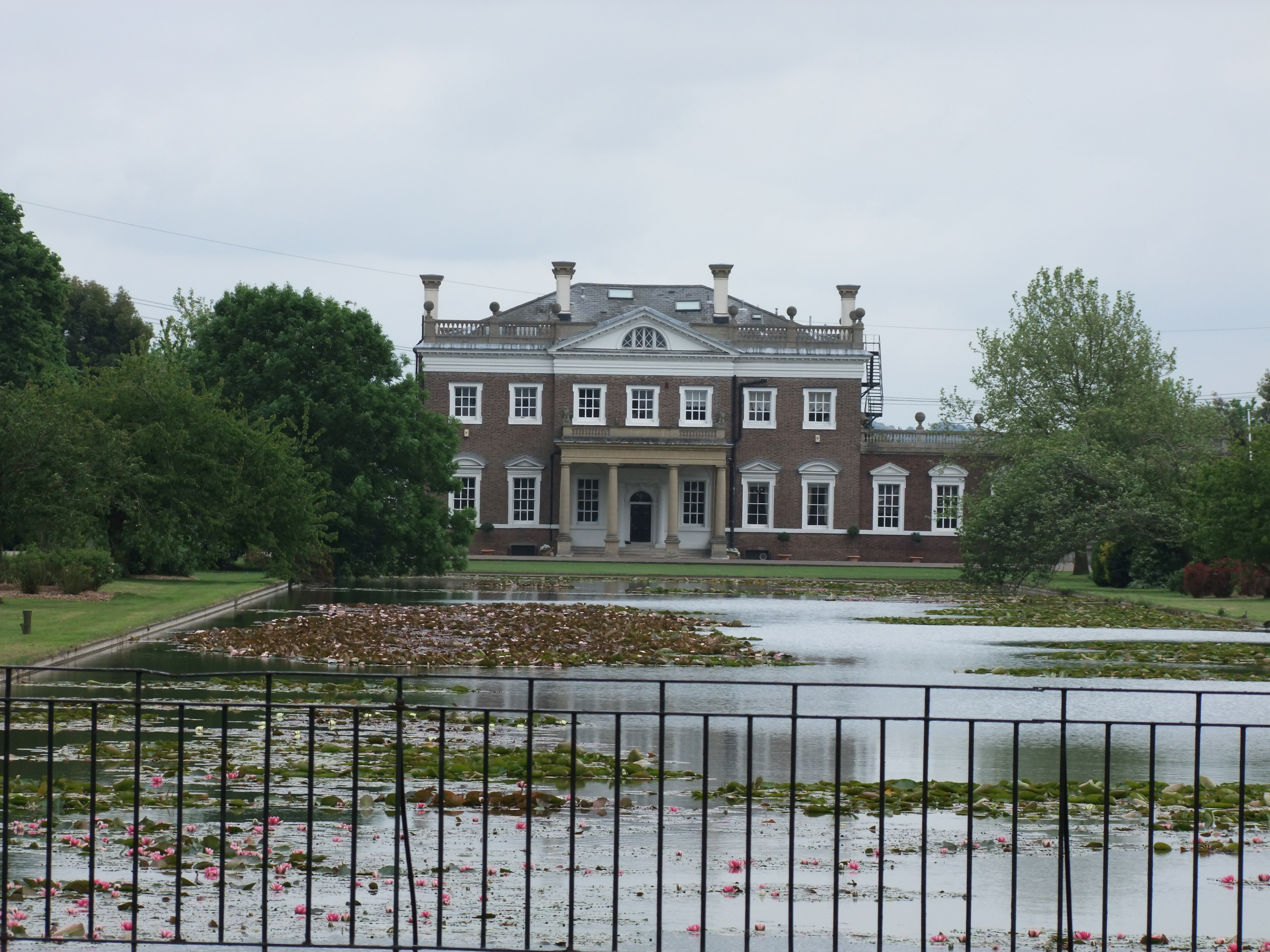
Boreham House

Boreham House is a Grade I Listed mansion set in 35 acres (140,000 m^{2}) at Boreham, Chelmsford, Essex, England. Boreham House was built from 1728 to 1733 for Benjamin Hoare and from 1931 to 1997 the House was owned by the Ford Company and used as a College.

== Location ==
The south face of the building fronts the top of Danbury Hill and Little Baddow Common.

== Origins ==
In 1713, the widow of Christopher Monck, 2nd Duke of Albemarle, sold part of her estate to Benjamin Hoare, son of Richard Hoare, the wealthy Fleet Street banker. New Hall continued to be occupied by the widow until her death. So, Benjamin Hoare decided to build Boreham House as his new family home. The main building was begun in 1728 and finished in 1733.

== Architects ==
The design of the house has been attributed to James Gibbs or Henry Flitcroft. Gibbs built the London churches St Mary-le-Strand and St Martin-in-the-Fields in Trafalgar Square. The physical builder of Boreham House was the architect Edward Shepherd, who also built the Shepherd Market in Mayfair. In 1812, Thomas Hooper, a well-known architect at the time, added the grand carriage entrances to the left and right of the main building.

== History ==
Boreham House stayed in the Hoare family until 1785, when William Walford bought it and rented it until 1792 to Sir Elija Impey, a British judge. Around 1792, Sir John Tyrell, 1st Baronet, bought the House. He was a local Justice of the Peace. In 1832, his son Sir John Tyrell, 2nd Baronet inherited Boreham House. He sat in Parliament as a Conservative member for Essex. He died in 1877, leaving Boreham House in tail to his grandson, Lieutenant Colonel Tufnell Tyrell, sheriff of Essex. The House stayed in the Family until 1931, when Henry Ford bought it.

Ford saw Boreham House for the first time in 1930 when he was returning from Oberammergau, where he saw the Passion Play. He went into the English countryside and noticed the very bad conditions of farms and farm buildings which he passed. He bought Boreham House on 2 May 1931 to show that British agriculture could prosper and make people's lives easier. Ford developed this new venture under a new company called Fordson Estate Limited.

In 1937, the house, with a parcel of the land, was donated to trustees of the Henry Ford Institute of Agricultural Engineering. Boreham House started to be a college in 1952, when it became the main training centre for the Ford Tractor Operation in Europe. The house also served as the temporary home for the National College of Agricultural Engineering in 1962. This moved to Silsoe, Bedfordshire Silsoe College, later joining Cranfield University. The Silsoe campus closed at the end of 2007.

In 1997, the house reverted to single-family occupation. Since 2008, it has been used as a wedding venue and corporate centre.
