= Chris Cracknell =

English rugby union player

Chris Cracknell, OF
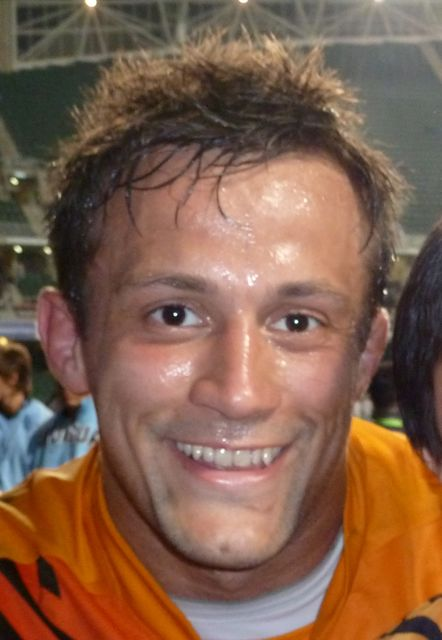
- Cracknell at the 2012 Hong Kong Sevens
- Born: 6 August 1984 (age 42) Windsor, Berkshire, England
- Height: 6 ft 2 in (1.88 m)
- Weight: 17 st 0 lb (108 kg)
- School: Claires Court, Crosfields School, Shiplake College

Rugby union career
- Position: Flanker
Youth career
- -: Maidenhead RFC
Senior career
Years	Team	Apps	(Points)
-	Harlequins		
2005–2006	Newbury Blues	26	(50)
2006–2008	Cornish Pirates	51	(80)
2008–2009	Exeter Chiefs	14	(15)
2009	Bath	4	(0)
2009	Pertemps Bees	2	(0)
2010	Worcester	10	(0)
National sevens team
Years	Team		Comps
-	England 7's		12
Coaching career
- Years: Team
- 2014–2015: Fiji 7's
- 2015–2021: Fijiana
- 2022–: Belgium

Chris Cracknell OF (born 6 August 1984 in Windsor, England) is a former England rugby union player. He coached the Fijiana team after being brought in by Ben Ryan in 2014. Cracknell attended Ridgeway (Junior School to Claires Court), Crosfields School and Shiplake College. The latter now hosts a 7s tournament in which schools compete for the 'Cracknell Cup' named in honour of the alumnus.

A flanker, Cracknell has previously played for the Cornish Pirates, Exeter Chiefs, Bath, and Worcester Warriors.

In May 2010, Cracknell became subject of a WRFC and RFU investigation, when he became involved in an altercation with fellow Worcester player James Collins's father following the team's relegation decider match with Leeds. He was later fined and banned.

In 2015, Fiji Rugby Union confirmed that he has been chosen to be the assistant coach for the Fiji 7's team alongside Ben Ryan, who became the Fiji coach in 2013. In 2015, he was promoted as the head coach for the Fijiana team.

In 2022, Cracknell was named as the Belgium national team's coach, taking over from Frédéric Cocqu.

== Honours and awards ==
After the 2016 Summer Olympics, Cracknell was awarded the Officer of the Order of Fiji.
