= Baron Waltham =

Baron Waltham, of Philipstown in the King's County, was a title in the Peerage of Ireland. It was created in 1762 for John Olmius, previously Member of Parliament for Weymouth and Melcombe Regis and Colchester. His son, the second Baron, represented Maldon in the House of Commons. However, he was childless and on his death in 1787 the barony became extinct. The Honourable Elizabeth Olmius, only daughter of the first Baron, married John Luttrell, later third Earl of Carhampton. In 1787 he assumed by Royal licence the additional surname of Olmius as a mark of respect for his father-in-law. However, the earldom and its subsidiary titles became extinct on his death in 1829.

The family seat was New Hall, near Boreham, Essex.

== Barons Waltham (1762) ==
- John Olmius, 1st Baron Waltham (1711–1762)
- Drigue Billers Olmius, 2nd Baron Waltham (1746–1787)

== See also ==
- Earl of Carhampton
