= Canonesses Regular of the Holy Sepulchre =

Catholic female religious order

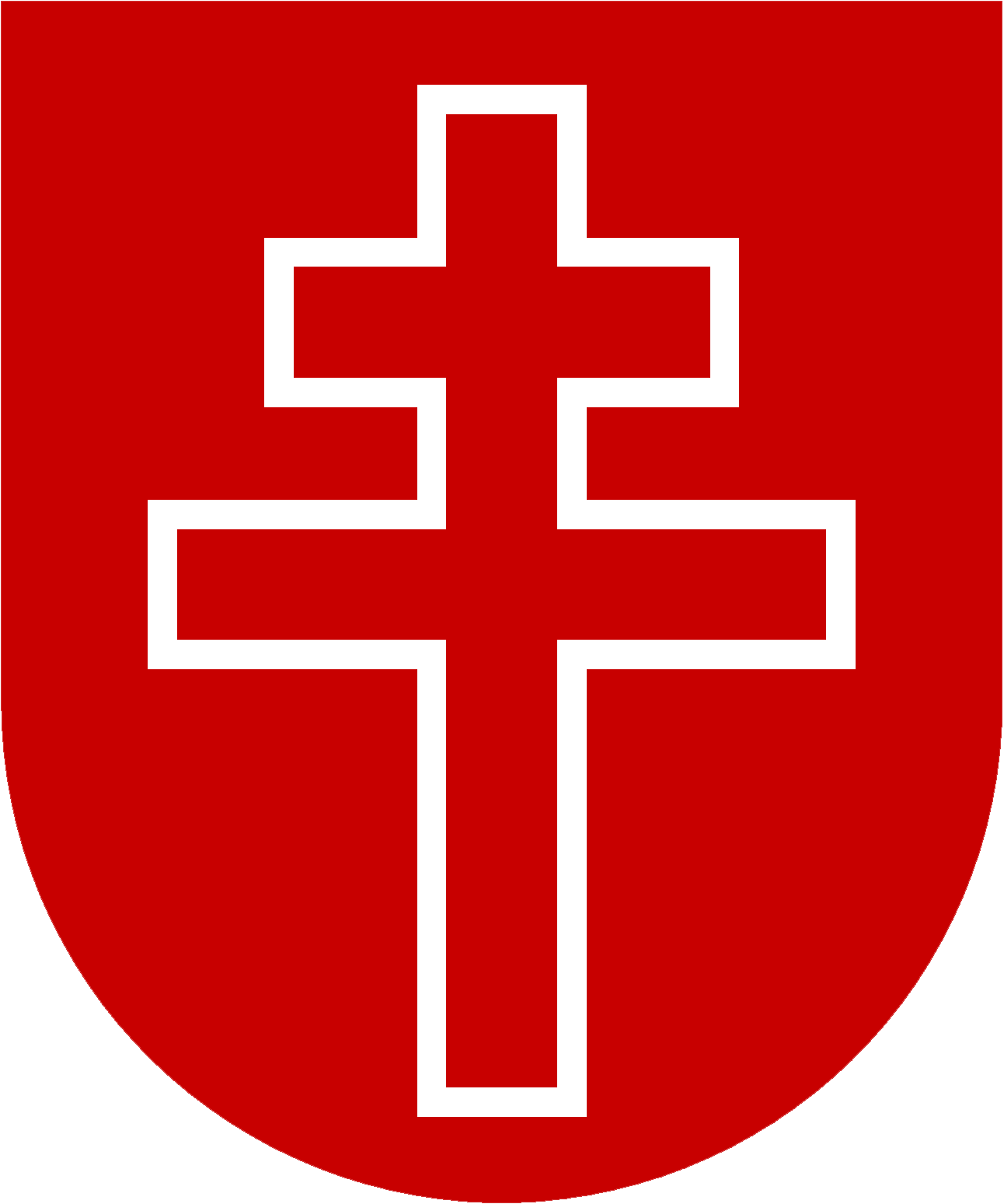
- Emblem of the Canonesses Regular of the Holy Sepulchre
- Abbreviation: CRSS
- Formation: c. AD 1114; 912 years ago
- Type: Catholic religious order
- Website: www.canonesses.co.uk

The Canonesses Regular of the Holy Sepulchre (CRSS), or Sepulchrine Canonesses, are a Catholic female religious order first documented in 1300. They were originally the female branch of the ancient religious order of that name, the Canons Regular of the Holy Sepulchre. The canonesses follow the Rule of St. Augustine.

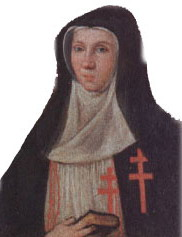
A canoness regular of the Holy Sepulcher

The traditional habit was black and, when in church, over the tunic the choir sisters would wear a white, sleeveless, linen rochet, on the left side of which was embroidered a red, double-barred cross. Where still used, a black veil is worn by the professed, and a white one by novices and lay sisters; the later category, however, was abolished among religious orders by order of the Holy See in the 20th century.

== History ==
Concerning the foundation, there is a tradition connecting the way of life of the canonesses with James the Great, and depicting Helena, the mother of Constantine the Great, as being given the religious habit of a canoness by Macarius, Bishop of Jerusalem. It was he who accompanied the Empress in her search for the True Cross. The Order of the Holy Sepulchre adopted the rule of St Augustine in 1114.

=== Spain ===
The earliest historical date on record is 1300, the year in which the monastery was founded in the province of Teruel by the Marquise, Doña Gil de Rada. In 1306 the community was incorporated as part of the female branch of the Order of the Holy Sepulchre, a military Order founded in Jerusalem. The Prior General of the Knights confirmed the prioress as Religious Superior of the community. The Spanish canonesses still live in their ancient monastery in Zaragoza, built in the Mudéjar style when they moved there later in the 14th century.

=== France ===
The foundation of a house at Charleville in 1622 by the Marquise Claudine de Mouy, widow of Henri de Lorraine, the Count of Chaligny (1570–1600), was the catalyst for a great revival of the Order. New constitutions, drawn up by a Jesuit and approved by Pope Urban VIII in 1631, bound the canonesses to the recitation of the Divine Office, rigorous fasts, the use of the discipline, and a strict interpretation of the rule of poverty. Twelve was established as the minimum number of professed canonesses necessary for the canonical election of a prioress. All the monasteries of the Order in that country were swept away by the French Revolution, and the canonesses have not returned.

=== Belgium ===
==== Priory of Sion, Bilzen ====
The Priory of Sion in Bilzen was founded in 1634 as a daughter house of the Monastery of the Holy Sepulcher in Hasselt. Mother Helena d'Enckevoert, Prioress of the house in Maastricht and St. Agathe in Liège, established the community. A school for poor girls was also established at Sion, which remained in operation until the monastery was closed in 1798 by the armies of the French First Republic during their occupation of the Low Countries. The 20 sisters were expelled and they retreated to the béguinage in Hasselt or to their families. In 1837, two surviving canonesses of that community were able to re-acquire the monastery and resume monastic life there, along with two survivors of the other two communities. They then resumed their educational work, and the School of the Holy Sepulcher continues to operate today. The survivors were able to save a large part of the monastery archives, which remains a priceless source for the history of the Order and pre-Revolutionary Catholic life in Belgium.

In 1972, the canonesses acquired the grounds of the former Cistercian Abbey of Herkenrode, also in Belgium and also closed by French forces in 1798. They have built a new monastery and a retreat center there and are slowly renovating the surviving abbey buildings. The Church of the Risen Lord was built in 1982, and now serves the canonesses and their guests.

==== Jerusalem Priory, Turnhout ====
Canonesses of the Holy Sepulchre of Hasselt, who were sent to devote themselves to religious education and teaching of girls in schools and later on also in boarding schools in Turnhout, founded the Jerusalem Priory in 1662. Closed during the French Revolution in 1798, the Priory opened again in 1826 and was established in Patersstraat in Turnhout. Daughter houses were founded and in 1928 sisters left Belgium for the Congo as missionaries. They assisted in the development of the African Community of Bukavu which was included in the Association as an independent Priory in 1984.

==== St. Trudo Abbey, Male ====
St. Trudo Abbey was originally established as a 'double' convent (men/women) of the Ten Eeckhoute abbey in Bruges. In 1248 the Community of sisters became independent and later joined the Congregation of Saint-Victor, living for more than 400 years within the tradition of Windesheim. The abbey was affiliated with the Canons of the Lateran from 1796 until 1952 when they were admitted into the Order of the Holy Sepulchre. Since 1954 they have resided in the former castle of the counts of Flanders in Male.

=== England ===
In 1480 Jan van Abroek, himself a Canon of the Holy Sepulchre, established a convent at Kinrooi, near Maaseik on the Meuse for his sister Meyntz, and two Augustinian nuns from Roermond. There they started a school for girls. Later, the canonesses established the Convent des Bons Enfans, one of four such convents at Liège, Belgium. The convent of St. Walburge's at Liège established a convent at Tongeren in the early half of the seventeenth century.

Dame Susan Hawley (Mother Mary of the Conception) was the foundress of the surviving English branch of the canonesses (born at New Brentford, Middlesex, 1622; died at Liège, 1706), having been professed at Tongeren. In 1642 she left with four other women for Liège, to establish a monastery there for English women. By 1656 there was a sufficient number of professed canonesses that a canonical election could be held, in which she was elected prioress; she ruled with rare prudence until her resignation in 1697. The community was able to provide an education for the daughters of Catholic families under the Penal Laws.

The school, opened under Dame Mary Christina Dennett who was prioress from 1770 to 1781, proved so successful that, during the occupation of the Lowlands by the French, the English canonesses had great difficulty in securing permission to leave the city.

After three months at their monastery in Maastricht, they passed down the Meuse on a coal barge and made their way to England (August 1794), where they were sheltered by Lord Stourton (a member of an old Catholic aristocratic family) in Holme Hall, on Spaulding Moor, moved thence to Dean House (Wilts), and in 1798 finally took possession of New Hall, near Chelmsford (Essex). They opened a free school for the poor children of the neighborhood and it is now a private boarding school. The community resided at New Hall until 2005, when it moved to an estate in Chelmsford. New Hall remains home to a Catholic boarding school.

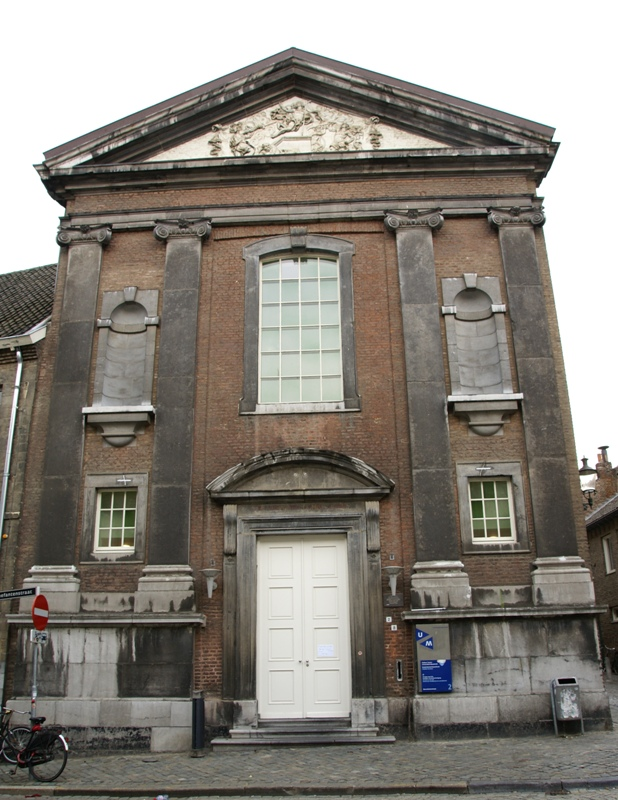
The 'Bonnefanten" convent in Maastricht, nowadays a faculty building of the University of Maastricht

=== Today ===
As of A.D. 2011, there were monasteries of the Order in Belgium, Brazil, the Democratic Republic of the Congo, England, the Netherlands and Spain. The majority of the communities have ceased to wear a traditional religious habit, but their identifying insignia remains the double-barred Cross of the Order.

== See also ==
- Order of the Holy Sepulchre

== Sources ==
- Max Heimbucher, Orden und Kongregationen (Paderborn, 1908)
- Francesca M. Steele, Convents of Great Britain (St. Louis, 1902)
- Hippolyte Hélyot, Dict. des ordres relig. (Paris, 1859)
- Joseph Gillow, Bibl. Dict. Eng. Cath., s. v. Hawley, Susan.
