= Susan Hawley =

- Born: 1622; Brentford
- Died: 1706 (aged 83–84); Liège
- Employer: Canonesses Regular of the Holy Sepulchre
- Known for: Prior

Susan Hawley renamed Mary of the Conception (1622 – 1706) was an English born Sepulchrine prioress in Liège. The organisation continues at three communities in south-east England in 2021. New Hall School in Chelmsford credits Hawley with founding their school in 1642.

== Life ==
Hawley was born in Brentford in 1622. Her parents were Julie (born Hawkins) and Thomas Hawley. By the time she was nineteen she had decided not only on a religious life but that she wanted to move to Flanders to establish a convent. It was not possible to do this in Protestant England at that time. She became a Sepulchrine when she joined the Convent of the Canonesses Regular of the Holy Sepulchre (Sepulchrines) at Tongres in 1641. She took the "name in religion" of Mary of the Conception.

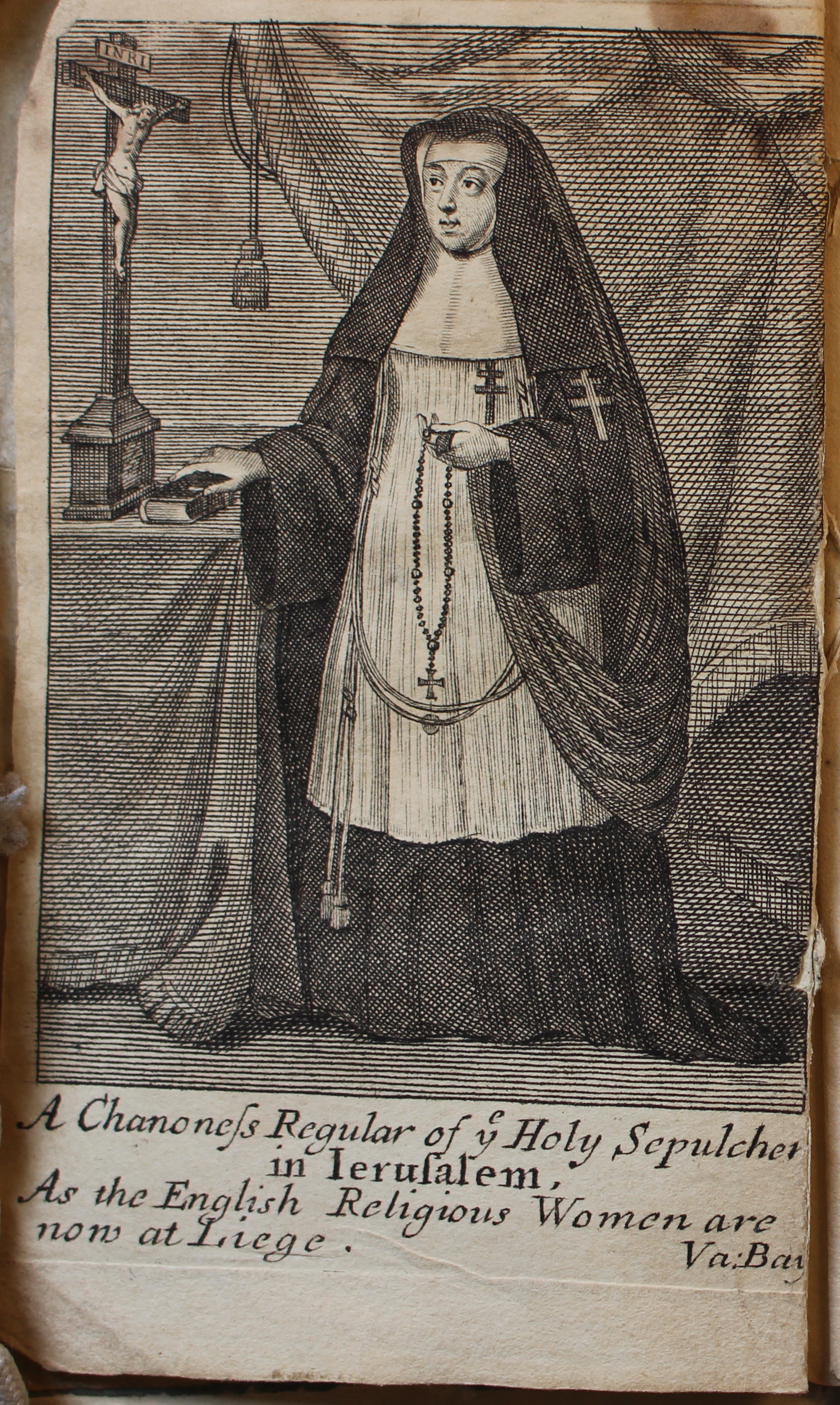
Frontispiece to "Brief relation of the order and institute of the English religious women at Liège"

She joined forces with two other English-born nuns and they decided to create a new house in Liège. From the start the community created a school for girls. They could receive a Catholic education without ever wanting to be a nun. By 1651 the school was creating funds seen in the accounts. The convent grew and there were twenty-two sisters within seven years. Hawley became the first prioress when she was elected in 1652. That same year she published "Brief relation of the order and institute of the English religious women at Liège" and several copies still exist. It would have been illegal to publish this Catholic document in England but these pamphlets were small enough to be kept secret. Durham University owns a copy and the nuns archives. They note that many copies contained instructions on how to get to Liège on the final page.

Their first house was considered unsafe, it lacked privacy and Liège was unruly. The applied to the prince-bishop for help and they then moved but building work was required. This was funded by the sale of gifted silver and a bequest and by 1660 their new home was complete.

== Death and legacy ==
Hawley died in Liège. The community that she founded continued and it moved to England in 1794. The move was required because of the aftermath of the French Revolution and much planning had to be done. Not only was this a large move, but being a Catholic was illegal. In 2021 there were communities in Chelmsford, London and Colchester. New Hall School continues and one of its houses is named "Hawley".
