= Boreham =

Village in Essex, England

Coordinates: 51.7599°N 0.5420°E

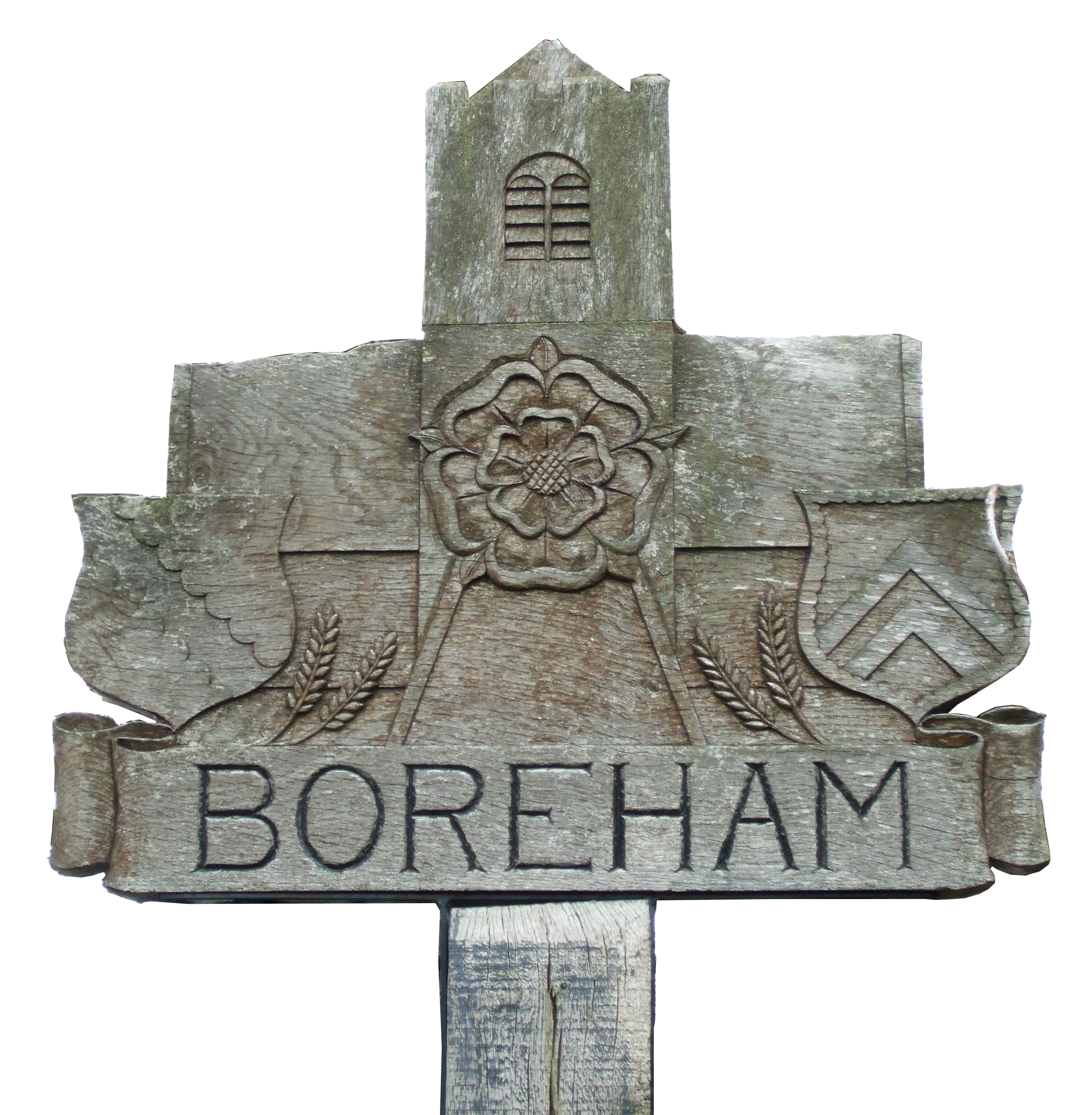
- Boreham village sign, showing the Saxon tower of St Andrew's Church

- Location within Essex
- Area: 6 sq mi (16 km^{2})
- Population: 3,973 (Parish, 2021)
  - Density: 662/sq mi (256/km^{2})
- OS grid reference: TL759099
- Civil parish: Boreham
- District: Chelmsford
- Shire county: Essex
- Region: East
- Country: England
- Sovereign state: United Kingdom
- Post town: CHELMSFORD
- Postcode district: CM3
- Dialling code: 01245
- Police: Essex
- Fire: Essex
- Ambulance: East of England
- UK Parliament: North West Essex

Boreham is a village and civil parish in the Chelmsford district of Essex, England. The village is approximately 3.7 miles (6.0 km) north-east of the centre of Chelmsford. At the 2021 census the parish had a population of 3,973.

== History ==
Boreham is listed in the Domesday Book of 1086 as Borham, thought to mean 'village on a hill'. King Henry VIII spent time at New Hall as did his daughter, Princess Mary.

Local legend holds that highwayman Dick Turpin rode down the route than now forms part of the A12 on his famous ride from London to York, although historians now believe the ride never occurred.

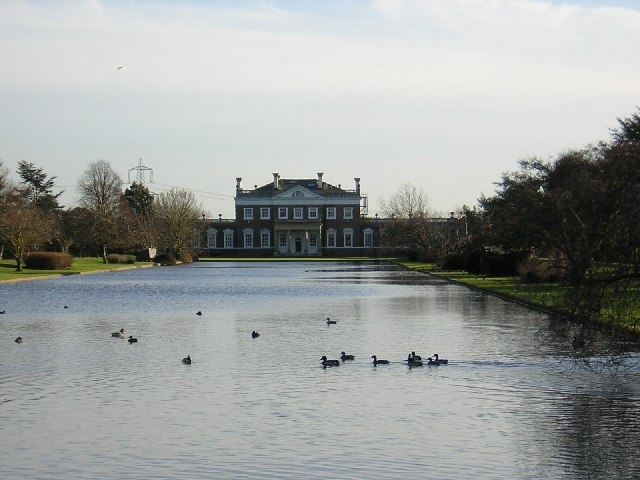
Boreham House by James Gibbs; now a wedding venue

In the 1930s Boreham House and its surrounding land of 3,000 acres (12 km^{2}) was bought by car magnate Henry Ford. In addition to using the house as a school for training Ford tractor mechanics, the company's British chairman, Lord Perry, established Fordson Estates Limited there, and founded the Henry Ford Institute of Agricultural Engineering, an agricultural college. The house also served as the temporary home for the National College of Agricultural Engineering in 1962. This moved to Silsoe, Bedfordshire as Silsoe College later joining with Cranfield University. The Silsoe campus closed at the end of 2007.

In 1952 a Ham class minesweeper, HMS Boreham, was named after the village.

Boreham remained relatively small until the mid-1970s when a programme of house and shop building increased its size significantly.

Boreham contains one of England's few remaining independent family-run gunsmiths, which was established in 1795.

== Geography and administration ==
In addition to being a village, Boreham is a civil parish which has a parish council

The parish is bounded at its south by the River Chelmer. The village, which lies on a Roman road (now a modern trunk road, the A12), has a Norman church, and a public house (The Cock Inn) that dates from the 15th century. The surrounding countryside is slightly hilly and is used to grow crops such as wheat, sugar beet and peas.

The Great Eastern Main Line from Chelmsford to Colchester runs past the village. In the 1970s a bypass was built along the northern edge of the village, along the same route as the A12 and the nearby railway line.

The parish includes the hamlet of Russell Green at the north.

== Landmarks ==
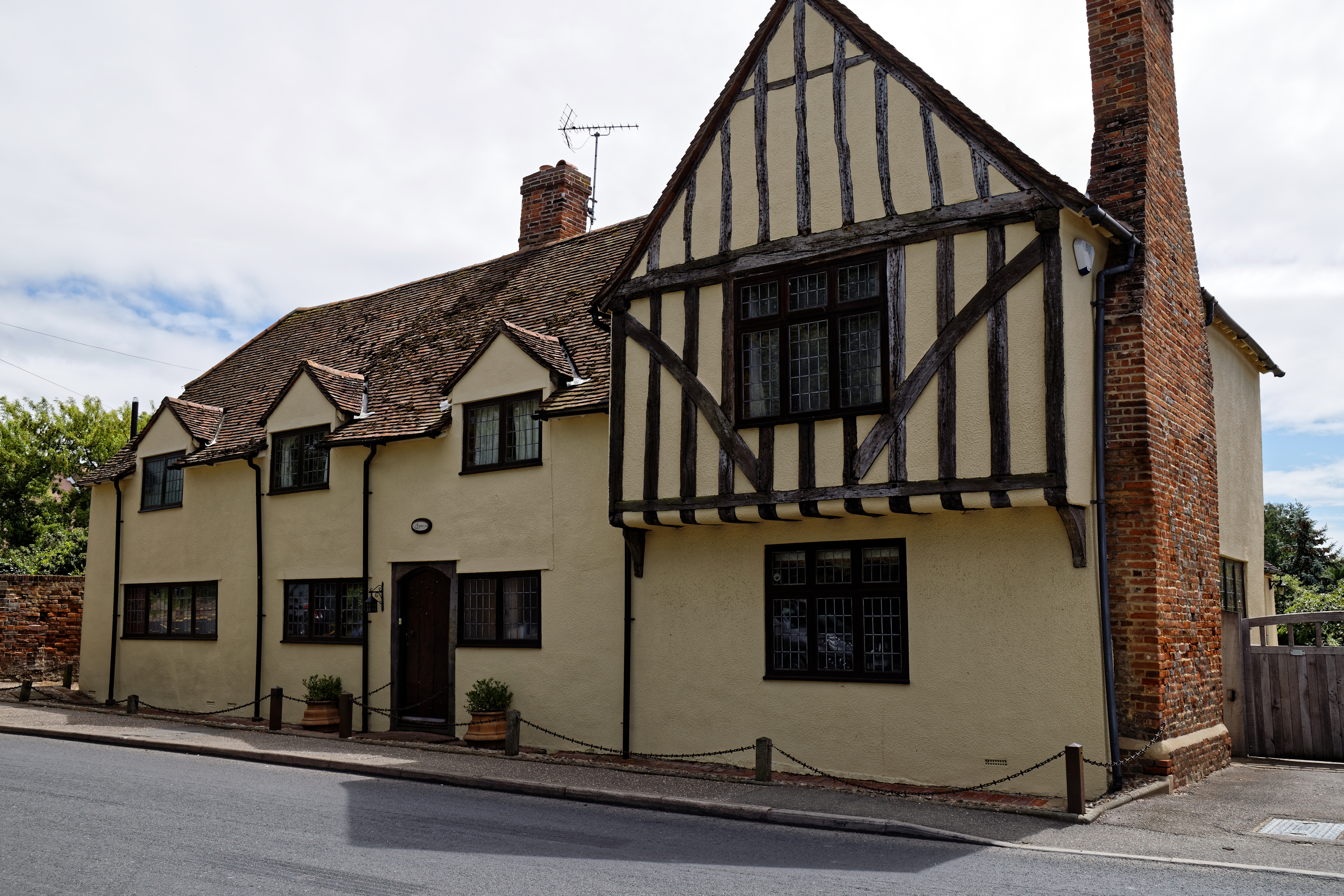
15th-century house, 'Babylon', at Boreham, Essex, England ("Church Road" Conservation Area)

Boreham has two designated conservation areas, which include buildings of historic importance. The Roman Road/Plantation Road Conservation Area contains, among others, a 16th-century timber-framed clockhouse. The Church Road Conservation Area has The Church, originally a small Saxon building, and several residential buildings.

=== New Hall School ===
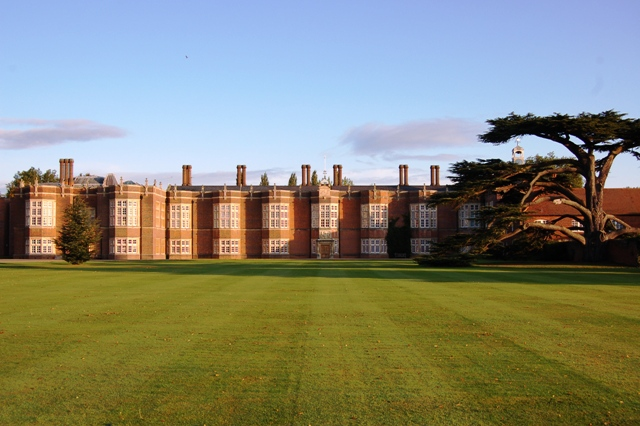
New Hall School near Boreham

One mile to the northwest of the village is New Hall School, once a palace of Henry VIII known as The Palace of Beaulieu. The estate on which it was built – the manor of Walhfare in Boreham – was granted to the Canons of Waltham Abbey in 1062. After a number of changes of possession, in 1491 it was granted by the Crown to the Earl of Ormond. By this time it had a house called New Hall.

In 1517 New Hall was sold by Thomas Boleyn, the father of Queen Anne Boleyn, to Henry VIII of England. The king rebuilt the house in brick at a cost of £17,000. He gave his new palace the name Beaulieu, though the name change did not outlast the century. New Hall was later the estate of the Tyrell family and latterly the Hoare banking family. In 1727, Benjamin Hoare commissioned architect Henry Flitcroft to build a new home nearby known as Boreham House, a stately home; the early Georgian mansion is now a Grade I listed building.

=== Boreham airfield and circuit ===
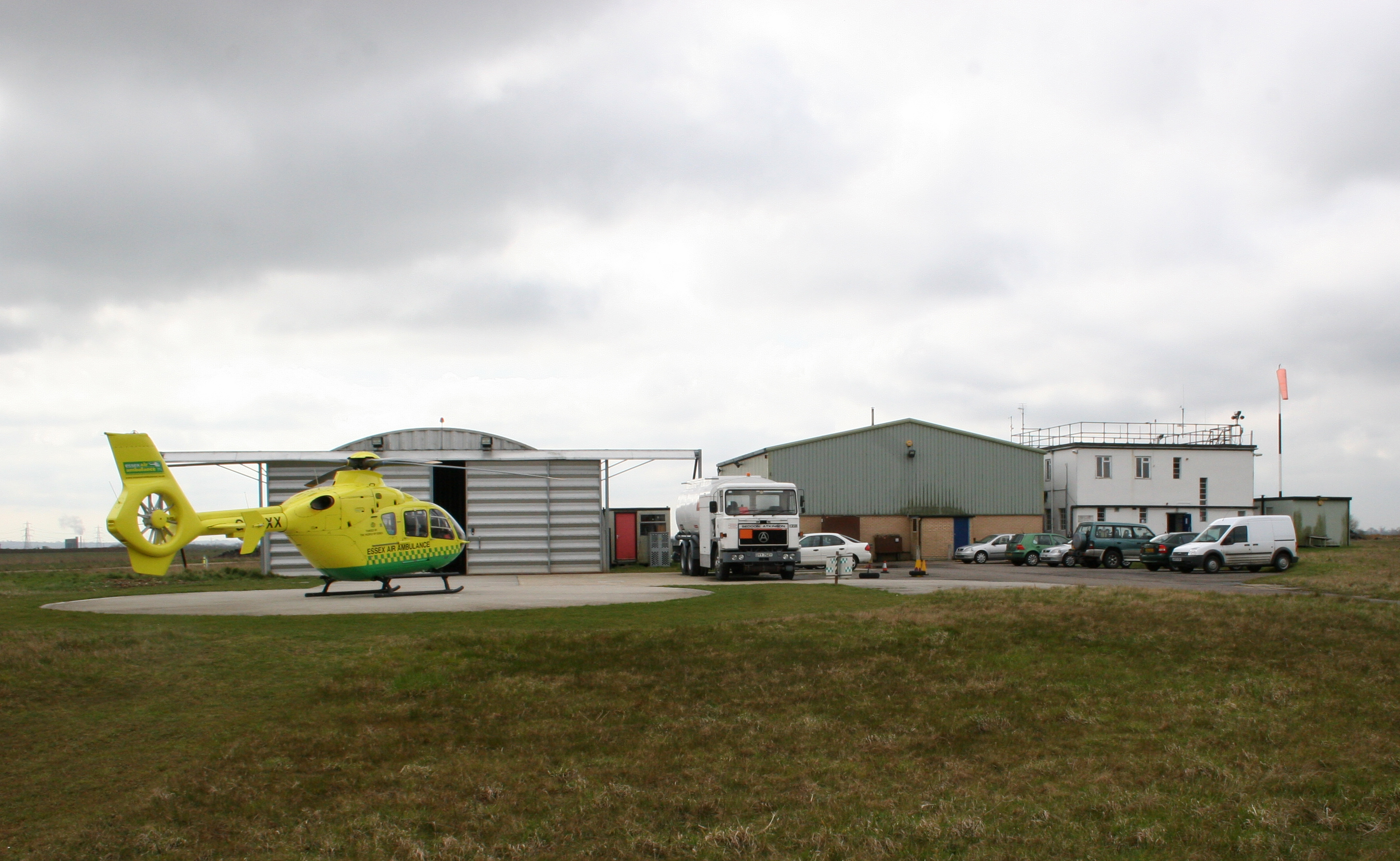
Essex Air Ambulance operations at Boreham airfield

A forest near the village was felled in 1943 to build a military airfield, and the three one-mile (1,600 m) runways of RAF Boreham opened in 1944. It hosted elements of the US Army Air Forces 394th Medium Bomb Group (flying Martin B-26 Marauder bombers) and later the 315th Troop Carrier Group flying Douglas C-47 Skytrains. After the Second World War the three runways were adapted into a roughly triangular motor racing circuit Boreham Circuit, which held competitive meetings between 1949 and 1952. It was bought by Ford in 1955 for use as a development test track. Ford Motorsport moved to Boreham in 1963, and although some of the track was removed for gravel quarrying in 1996 the remaining track surface continues to be used for testing. Essex Police Air Support Unit have been based at the airfield and in 1990 began using Boreham airfield as a control centre for its fleet of helicopters. From 1997 to 2010, Essex Air Ambulance was also based at the site; it is now based at Earls Colne airfield.

=== Boreham Interchange ===
To the west of Boreham lies the A12 Boreham Interchange, at which is a service facility with a BP petrol station, a McDonald's restaurant, and a Premier Inn motel. On the opposite side of the A12 is another Premier Inn and The Grange public house.

=== Beaulieu Park railway station ===
Located directly next to Boreham Interchange, Beaulieu Park is a station on the Great Eastern Main Line (GEML). Construction started on Chelmsford's second station in March 2023 and opened in October 2025. It is the newest station on the GEML for over a century.

== Notable people ==
- Elizabeth Stafford, Countess of Sussex (c. 1439–1572) is buried in the village.
- Thomas Wharton, 2nd Baron Wharton was given a residence in the village by Queen Mary I of England.
- Beatrice ap Rice, servant of Mary I who was given a residence in the village
- Rod Harrington, former professional darts player.
