= Seatrade Communications =

Seatrade Communications (formerly Seatrade) was an English publisher and event company for the maritime industries, established by Themistocles Vokosin in November 1970. Seatrade Communications was acquired by UBM in 2014, and as of June 2019 became part of Informa Markets, a division of Informa Plc the world's leading event organiser. It continues as an online news website, the Seatrade Maritime News.

== History ==
Seatrade was founded by Themistocles Vokos in 1970. That year, the first issue of the brand's maritime magazine, Seatrade Maritime Review, was published, followed in 1997 by cruise counterpart Seatrade Cruise Review.

In 1973, Seatrade Communications launched its first event, the Money and Ship conference. Later, it would establish various cruise and maritime events, including the Seatrade Maritime Awards in 1989.

Seatrade Communications went on to launch a news website for the cruise industry in 2000, initially titled Seatrade Insider and in 2015 named Seatrade Cruise News. The maritime equivalent, Seatrade Global, was introduced in 2013, eventually becoming Seatrade Maritime News.

In 2014, Seatrade Communications was acquired by UBM for an undisclosed amount, and as of June 2019 became part of Informa Markets, a division of Informa Plc.

== Seatrade Academy ==
The Seatrade Academy was a shipping-focused academy, set up by Seatrade in 1978 and run in association with the Cambridge Academy of Transport. The academy has three shipping related courses: the Anatomy of Shipping, the Business of Shipping - Asia, and the Business of Shipping - UAE.
