= National College of Agricultural Engineering =

Former college in Bedfordshire, England

Prospectus Cover for the third academic year

The National College of Agricultural Engineering was opened in 1962. It was closed as a separate entity at the end of 2007 and the land sold for housing.

== Foundation ==
NCAE logo

In February 1959, the Minister of Education of the United Kingdom announced to the House of Commons that a new National College devoted to agriculture was to be established to provide a national centre for the agricultural engineering industry which would also attract overseas students. The National College of Agricultural Engineering as it was initially known began at Silsoe in Bedfordshire, England.

In September 1962, the first cohort of 20 undergraduate students began their studies at Boreham House near Chelmsford in Essex. The move to the more permanent home at Silsoe was in 1963. In 1964 the first 15 postgraduate students joined from nine countries.

== Merger ==
The Department of Education and Science and the Department for Education and Skills, as it became, decided that the college should merge with a larger organisation and in December 1975 decided that it should become a part of the then Cranfield Institute of Technology, now Cranfield University. At the time there were 122 undergraduates and 100 postgraduates. The name was changed to Silsoe College in 1983. Shuttleworth College joined in 1988 with the Shuttleworth programmes being relocated to Silsoe in 1996. In 2005, it was announced that academic activities would move to the Cranfield main campus. This was completed by December 2007 with activities becoming part of two new schools: the School of Applied Sciences and Cranfield Health. The college farm was retained as an important outdoor laboratory for teaching and research purposes and the remainder of the Silsoe site was to be sold for redevelopment.

== Soil Survey and Land Research Centre ==
The former 'Soil Survey of England and Wales' (SSEW) that had commenced in 1939 in Bangor University, and then been transferred to Rothamsted Experimental Station in 1947, was moved to the Silsoe site, joining the college, in 1987. As the survey joined Silsoe, so it changed its name to the 'Soil Survey and Land Research Centre' (SSLRC), led by Professor Peter Bullock. Later Directors were Mike Jarvis and Dick Thompson. Marking a then closer integration with the wider Silsoe College, the organization changed names again in 2002 to the 'National Soil Resources Institute (NSRI), led by Professor Mark Kibblewhite. In 2006, NSRI, along with the rest of the staff and students at Silsoe were moved to the Cranfield University campus in Cranfield, Bedfordshire. Led by Director Dr Thomas Mayr the institute then became part of the formation of the Cranfield Soil and Agrifood Institute (CSAFI) led by Professor Leon Terry.
