= 223 (disambiguation) =

223, 223rd, may refer to:

== In general ==
- 223 (number), a number in the 200's range
- AD 223 (CCXXIII), a year in the Common Era
- 223 BC, a year Before the Common Era

== Places ==
- +223, the telephone country code for Mali
- Area code 223, Pennsylvania, United States; a North American telephone area code
- 223 Rosa, the asteroid Rosa, a Themistian asteroid in the Main Asteroid Belt, the 223rd asteroid registered
- Rural Municipality of Huron No. 223, Saskatchewan, Canada
- Waskwiatik Sakahikan 223, Saskatchewan, Canada; an indian reserve of the Peter Ballantyne Cree Nation
- Clearwater River Dene Band 223, Northern Saskatchewan, Saskatchewan, Canada; an indian reserve of the Clearwater River Dene Nation
- Collin Lake 223, Wood Buffalo, Alberta, Canada; an indian reserve of the Mikisew Cree First Nation
- Highway 223, any of several highways numbered with 223

=== Electoral districts ===
- NA-223 Badin-II (constituency 223), Badin, Sindh, Pakistan; a constituency of the National Assembly of Pakistan
- NA-223 (Badin-I) (constituency 223), Badin, Sindh, Pakistan; a former constituency of the National Assembly of Pakistan
- NA-223 (Matiari) (constituency 223), Matiari, Sindh, Pakistan; a former constituency of the National Assembly of Pakistan
- Constituency PP-223 (Sahiwal-IV) (constituency 223), Sahiwal, Punjab, Pakistan; a former constituency of the Provincial Assembly of Punjab

== Military units ==
- 223rd (disambiguation), military units numbered "223rd"
- No. 223 Squadron IAF, Indian Air Force
- No. 223 Squadron RAF, British Royal Air Force
- 223 Field Park Squadron, Royal Engineers, British Army
- Battery 223, Lower Township, Cape May County, New Jersey, United States; a World War II coastal defense battery

=== Ships with pennants numbered 223 ===
- German submarine U-223, a World War II German submarine
- German frigate Nordrhein-Westfalen (F 223), a 21st-century German Baden-Württemberg-class frigate
- HMT Bredon (T223), a World War II British Royal Navy Hill-class trawler
- JDS Yoshino (DE-223), a Japanese Chikugo-class destroyer escort
- ROCS Chung Fu (LST-223), a Taiwanese landing ship for tanks of the Republic of China Navy
- NOAAS Miller Freeman (R 223), a U.S. oceanographic research ship of National Oceanic and Atmospheric Administration

==== United States Navy ====
- USS Bonefish (SS-223), a World War II U.S. Navy Gato-class submarine
- USS De Grasse (AK-223), a World War II U.S. Navy Crater-class cargo ship
- USS Dour (AM-223), a World War II U.S. Navy Admirable-class minesweeper
- USS McCormick (DD-223), a World War II U.S. Navy Clemson-class destroyer
- USS Pitt (APA-223), a World War II U.S. Navy Haskell-class attack transport
- USS Sea Gull (SP-223), a World War I U.S. Navy patrol yacht
- USS Spangenberg (DER-223), a World War II U.S. Navy Buckley-class destroyer escort
- USS Triana (IX-223), a World War II U.S. Navy Liberty ship freighter
- USS LST-223, a World War II U.S. Navy tank landing ship

== Other uses ==
- .223 (disambiguation), several ammunition with calibre ".223"
- Object 223, a World War II Soviet KV-3 heavy tank
- 223 series, an electric-multiple-unit train class of West Japan Railway Co.
- London Buses route 223, London, England, UK

== See also ==
- 223rd (disambiguation)
- USA-223 (NRO L-23), a U.S. spy satellite
- "223's", a 2019 song by YNW Melly
- 23 (disambiguation)
