= List of highways numbered 223 =

The following highways are numbered 223:

== Canada ==
- Nova Scotia Route 223
- Prince Edward Island Route 223
- Quebec Route 223

== China ==
- China National Highway 223

== Costa Rica ==
- National Route 223

== Japan ==
- Japan National Route 223

== United Kingdom ==
- A223 road
- B223 road

== United States ==
- U.S. Route 223
- Alabama State Route 223
- California State Route 223
- Georgia State Route 223
- K-223 (Kansas highway)
- Kentucky Route 223
- Maine State Route 223
- Maryland Route 223
- Minnesota State Highway 223
- Montana Secondary Highway 223
- Nevada State Route 223
- New Mexico State Road 223
- New York State Route 223
- Ohio State Route 223 (former)
- Oregon Route 223
- Pennsylvania Route 223 (former)
- South Carolina Highway 223
- Tennessee State Route 223
- Texas State Highway 223
- Utah State Route 223 (former)
- Virginia State Route 223
- Washington State Route 223
- Wyoming Highway 223

== See also ==
- 223 (disambiguation)

Preceded by 222	Lists of highways 223	Succeeded by 224
