= 223rd Division =

223rd Division may refer to:

- 223rd Infantry Division (Wehrmacht), Germany
- 223rd Coastal Division, Italy
- 223rd Rifle Division, Soviet Union

== See also ==
- List of military divisions by number
- 223rd Brigade (disambiguation)
- 223rd Regiment (disambiguation)
- 223rd (disambiguation)
