= 223rd Regiment =

223rd Regiment may refer to:

- 223rd Anti-aircraft Missile Regiment, Ukraine
- 223rd Infantry Regiment, United States

== See also ==
- 223rd Brigade (disambiguation)
- 223rd (disambiguation)
