= .223 (disambiguation) =

.223 most commonly refers to the .223 Remington catridge.

.223 may also refer to:

- .223 MINISAS, a cartridge for close-quarter battle use
- .223 Winchester Super Short Magnum, a cartridge based on the Winchester Short Magnum case
- .223 Wylde chamber, a hybrid rifle chamber designed to allow .22 caliber barrels to safely fire either .223 Remington or 5.56×45mm NATO ammunition

== See also ==
- 223 (disambiguation)
