= 154th Training Squadron =

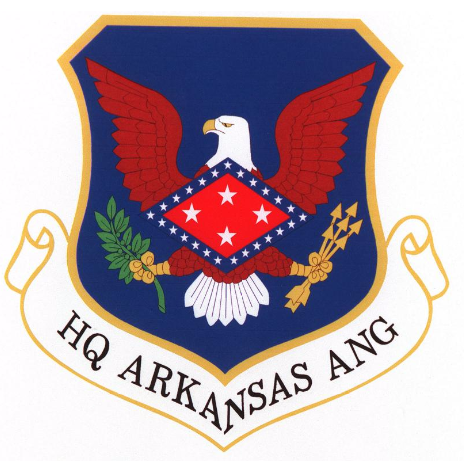
154th Training Squadron

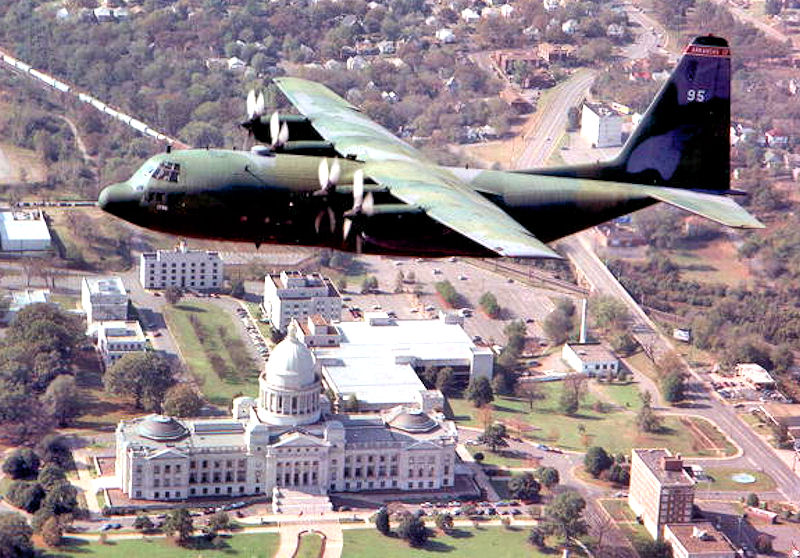
- A 189th Airlift Wing C-130 cargo plane flies over the state capitol in Little Rock, Arkansas
- Active: 1917–1919; 1925–1945; 1946–1952; 1952–present
- Country: United States
- Branch: Air National Guard
- Type: Squadron
- Role: Airlift training
- Part of: Arkansas Air National Guard
- Garrison/HQ: Little Rock Air Force Base, Arkansas
- Motto: Ducimus (Latin for 'We Lead')
- Engagements: World War I Mediterranean Theater of Operations Korean War
- Decorations: Distinguished Unit Citation

Commanders
- Notable commanders: J. Carroll Cone; Winston P. Wilson

Insignia
- 154th Fighter Squadron emblem

- Tail stripe

The 154th Training Squadron is a unit of the Arkansas Air National Guard 189th Airlift Wing. It is stationed at Little Rock Air Force Base, Arkansas and is equipped with the C-130H Hercules aircraft.

The squadron is the descendant of the World War I 154th Aero Squadron, established on 8 December 1917. It was reformed on 24 October 1925, as the 154th Observation Squadron, and is one of the 29 original National Guard Observation Squadrons of the Army National Guard formed before World War II.

== Mission ==
The mission of the 154th Training Squadron is to train C-130 aircrew instructor candidates to become instructors in their respective crew positions, so that they may return to their units and help keep their unit members combat ready.

The 154th Training Squadron is one of the most highly decorated Air National Guard units in the US. The unit is currently converting to C-130H aircraft modified under the C-130 Avionics Modernization Program. In addition, the wing operates the Air National Guard Enlisted Aircrew Academic School, which trains all the Air Force's C-130 entry-level loadmasters before they are sent across base to the 314th Airlift Wing for initial and mission qualification training. Additionally, the academic school is one of two flight engineer schools to provide entry-level flight engineer training for Air Force flight engineers.

== History ==
=== World War I ===
The squadron traces its origins to the 154th Aero Squadron, organized at Kelly Field, Texas, on 8 December 1917. The squadron was formed with 150 men collected from thirty-two states in every region of the nation. After a week at Kelly Field, the men were moved to Scott Field, Illinois, on 16 December for basic indoctrination training. At Scott, the men were instructed in drill and guard duty. Many personnel transfers happened at Scott with about 76 men transferred to other squadrons, and about 78 transferred into the 154th. On 26 January, the squadron was ordered for overseas duty, and was moved to the Aviation Concentration Center, Garden City, Long Island. It arrived on 29 January 1918 at Mineola Field, where it was prepared and equipped for overseas duty. The squadron was quarantined for several weeks at Mineola due to a rash of measles. However, on 16 February, the squadron was ordered to report to the New York Port of Embarkation at Hoboken, New Jersey, to board the former Cunard Liner RMS Carmania and sailed immediately. The voyage across the Atlantic was uneventful and it arrived at Liverpool, England, on 4 March. In England, the squadron moved to the American Rest Camp at Romsey, near Winchester, arriving there the same date.

At Winchester, the 154th was ordered detached to the Royal Flying Corps for technical training, and departed for the No. 3 Training Depot Station (TDS), RFC Lopcome Center, Nether Wallop, England on 17 March. The squadron was the first American unit assigned to this part of England, and the English had very little knowledge about the traits or character or to what the squadron's status was at the station. It was assigned to the RFC-34 Wing, and the men were assigned to duty and training in the hangars and various schools of instruction. Initially there was a tendency to minimize the mechanical knowledge of the men of the squadron, however their anxiety to learn was displayed in almost every department and within several weeks, the elementary training was ended and the squadron was entrusted with work of the most important nature. At the end of two months' training, the 154th was in complete control of two full Flights, consisting of about 24 airplanes, Sopwith Camels, Pups and Avroes. In addition, squadron mechanics in the workshops, the airplane repair shops, the armorers in the gunnery school and the drivers in the Transport Flight had relieved a large proportion of the British personnel for service at the front lines in France. On 16 August, the squadron was split up into several Flights for final training at advanced bases in England, before being re-assembled at Winchester on the 30th. There, orders were received for transfer to France. On 12 September the squadron proceeded to Le Havre, France, and moved to British Rest Camp No.2 there waiting further orders. It then moved to the Replacement Concentration Center, AEF, St. Maixent Replacement Barracks, France, arriving on 17 September 1918.

On 25 September the 154th was ordered to report to the Commander, Air Service Acceptance Park No. 1 at Orly Aerodrome, France for temporary duty and to await orders for the Front. However, due to the sudden and unforeseen developments in the war situation, the squadron never received the transfer orders and was at Orly at the time of the Armistice with Germany on 11 November. While at Orly, the men were assigned to several departments, owing to their trades learned while on duty in England. On 24 December, the 154th was ordered to demobilize and moved to the Base Port at St. Nazarine for immediate transport back to the United States. The 154th returned to the United States in late January 1919 and arrived at Mitchel Field, New York, where the squadron members were demobilized and returned to civilian life.

=== Inter-War years ===
The great Mississippi River flood of 1927 was one of the worst natural disasters in American history. It inundated 27,000 square miles, an area about the size of New England, killing as many as 1,000 people and displacing 700,000 more. At a time when the entire budget of the federal government was barely $3 billion, the flood caused an estimated $1 billion in damage. Although National Guard aviation units had been regularly called upon to assist civil authorities since early in that decade, the 1927 flood marked the first time that an entire Guard flying unit and its government-issued aircraft had been mobilized to help deal with a major natural disaster.

Governor John E. Martineau called up the 10 officers and 50 enlisted members of the 154th Observation Squadron, Arkansas National Guard, to help locate stranded flood victims as well as to deliver food, medicines and supplies to them and relief workers. The unit also conducted aerial patrols along the Mississippi River scouting for weakened or broken levees. Its JN-4 Jenny aircraft flew some 20,000 miles during the mobilization which lasted from 18 April through 3 May 1927. Members of the unit also worked to strengthen and repair river levees.

Flood relief operations took a toll on the 154th. Two aircraft crashed and at least three aviators were injured. The unit's remaining aircraft were grounded for maintenance and repairs at one point. Because of the heavy burden of flight operations, five of the unit's aging JN-4s had to be replaced by PT-1 trainer aircraft in mid-May 1927. The flood relief work of the 154th underscores the long-standing but little understood history of Air National Guard units and their pre-World War II antecedents in supporting civil authorities.

=== World War II ===
The 154th Observation Squadron was activated for one year of training on 16 September 1940. The unit completed its one-year training and returned to state control, but was recalled to active duty on 7 December 1941. The unit received extensive stateside training before deploying to North Africa. Most of the squadron sailed from the United States in September 1942 on the Queen Mary, with its first overseas station in Wattisham, England, 4–21 October 1942. From there it boarded ship and sailed to be part of Operation Torch, the invasion of North Africa, going ashore on the second day (9 November 1942) of the invasion in Oran, Algeria. Over the next 2 ½ years the squadron would be stationed in St Leu, Tafaraoui, and Blida, Algeria; Oujda, French Morocco; Youks-les-Bains, Algeria; Thelepte, Sbeitla, Le Sers, and Korba, Tunisia; Nouvion and Oran, Algeria; with final station in Bari, Italy (3 February 1944 – 1 July 1945).

During the period of overseas deployment the 154th operated A-20 Havocs, P-39 Airacobras, P-38/F-4 Lightnings, and was the first unit to operate P-51 Mustangs in the Mediterranean Theatre. A total of 1495 missions and 2522 sorties were flown.

The 154th Tactical Reconnaissance Squadron, 68th Tactical Reconnaissance Group, was attached to the Fifteenth Air Force for the purpose of flying weather reconnaissance, a duty which had been handled by a P-38 unit called the Fifteenth Air Force Weather Reconnaissance Detachment. Personnel and equipment of the 154th Tactical Reconnaissance Squadron and the Weather Reconnaissance Detachment were subsequently integrated, and the unit was re-designated the 154th Weather Reconnaissance Squadron (Medium) on 12 May 44. Operations were limited to weather reconnaissance. The squadron was awarded a Distinguished Unit Citation: Rumania, 17, 18, 19 August 1944.

=== Arkansas Air National Guard ===
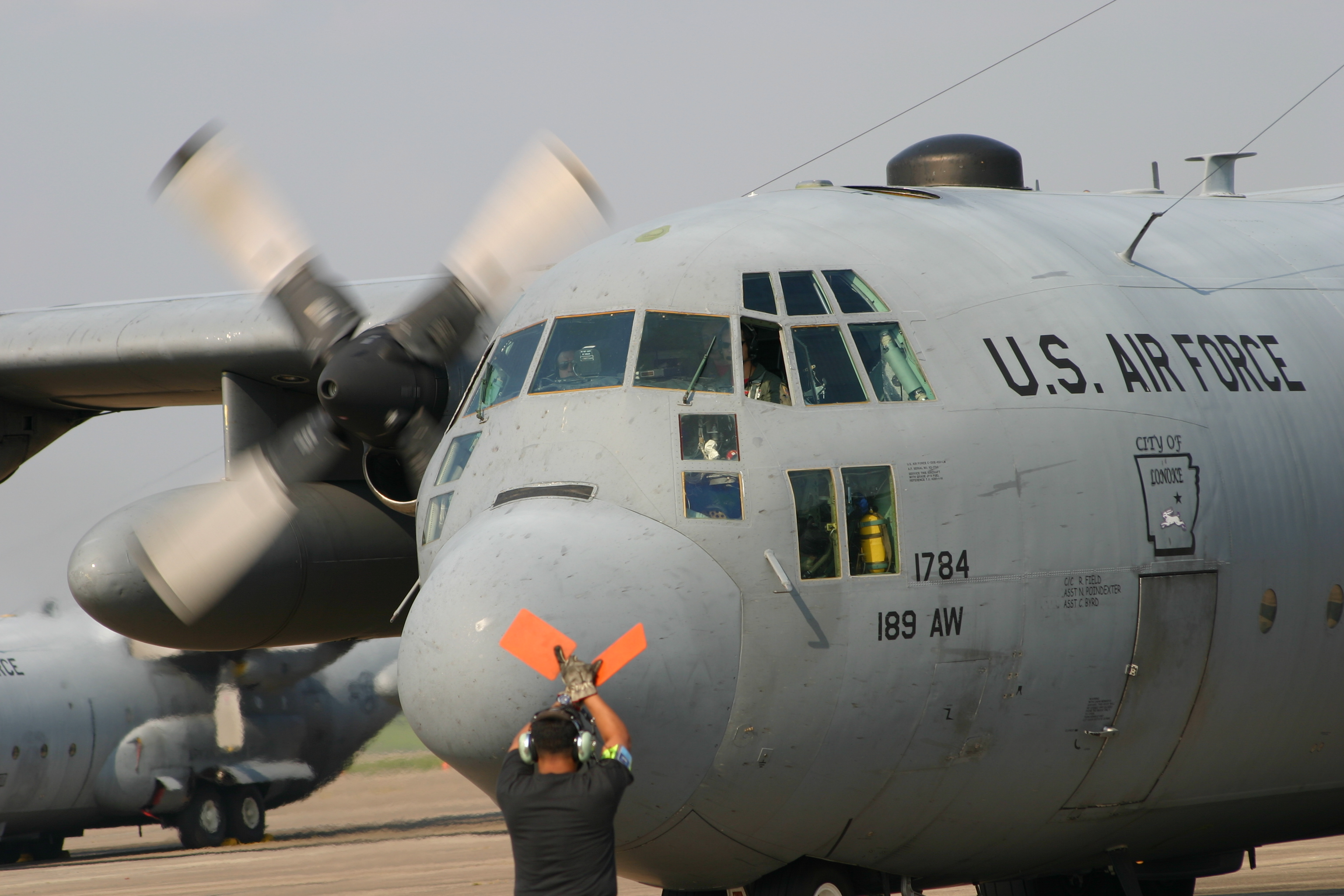
A C-130E belonging to the 154th Training Squadron being directed at an airbase in 2005

2 October 1950, the 154th Fighter Squadron, along with detachment B, 237th Air Services Group and the 154th Utility Flight reported to active duty for service in Korea. The unit went to Langley Air Force Base, VA where it was re-equipped with the F-84E fighter and completed transition training. The 154th flew its first combat sortie 2 May 1951. Initially operating out of Itaeke, Japan the unit later moved to Taegu, Korea. The 154th returned to Arkansas and was relieved from active duty 1 July 1952. While in Korea the 154th flew 3,790 combat sorties and was awarded the Presidential Korean Citation for its service

The squadron was inactivated in 1952 and redesignated the 154th Tactical Reconnaissance Squadron. The squadron was then relocated to Little Rock Air Force Base, Arkansas, and reorganized as the 189th Tactical Reconnaissance Group, absorbing elements of the 123rd Air Base Group.

The squadron moved from Adams Field to Little Rock Air Force Base, Jacksonville, AR, in September 1962 The 154th was the first Air National Guard unit to be equipped with the McDonnell RF-101 Voodoo in 1965. Soon after, the squadron was again activated to respond to the Pueblo Crisis in January 1968. In July, the 154th deployed to Itazuke Air Base, Japan, but was inactivated that December.

On 1 January 1976, the unit converted to Boeing KC-135 Stratotanker and was redesignated the 154th Air Refueling Squadron. It was then assigned to the Strategic Air Command, one of the first Air National Guard units to be assigned as such. The unit maintained a 24-hour alert and supported worldwide tanker task forces by performing in-flight refueling of all types of aircraft.

The unit received its first Lockheed C-130 Hercules on 1 July 1986 and began training C-130 aircrews. By 1 October, the unit had fully converted to the C-130. Student training began on 25 September. The unit was redesignated the 154th Airlift Squadron on 16 April 1992.

Since 1998, the squadron has been the exclusive provider for instructor training. The school instructs courses for all crew positions on board the C-130, and has taught students from all branches of the military.

Members of the 154th flew in Operations Desert Shield, Desert Storm, Enduring Freedom, Iraqi Freedom, and Noble Eagle. These operations did not affect the wing's training mission.

=== Lineage ===
- Organized as 154th Aero Squadron (Service) on 8 December 1917

Demobilized on 1 February 1919
Reconstituted and consolidated (1936) with 154th Observation Squadron which, having been allotted to Arkansas National Guard, was activated on 24 October 1925
Ordered to active service on 16 September 1940
Redesignated 19th Observation Squadron (Medium) on 13 January 1942
Redesignated 154th Observation Squadron on 4 July 1942
Redesignated 154th Reconnaissance Squadron (Fighter) on 31 May 1943
Redesignated 154th Tactical Reconnaissance Squadron on 13 November 1943
Redesignated 154th Weather Reconnaissance Squadron (Medium) on 12 May 1944
Redesignated 63d Reconnaissance Squadron (Long Range, Weather) on 4 September 1945
Inactivated on 12 December 1945.

- Redesignated 154th Fighter Squadron, and allotted to the National Guard on 24 May 1946

Extended federal recognition and activated on 27 May 1946
Federalized and placed on active duty on 10 October 1950
Redesignated 154th Fighter-Bomber Squadron on 26 October 1950
Inactivated and returned to state control on 10 July 1952

- Redesignated 154th Tactical Reconnaissance Squadron ond activated 10 July 1952

Federalized and placed on active duty and 26 January 1968
Returned to state control on 20 December 1968
Redesignated 154th Air Refueling Squadron, Heavy and activated, 1 January 1976
Redesignated 154th Tactical Airlift Training Squadron on 1 October 1986
Redesignated 154th Training Squadron on 16 April 1992

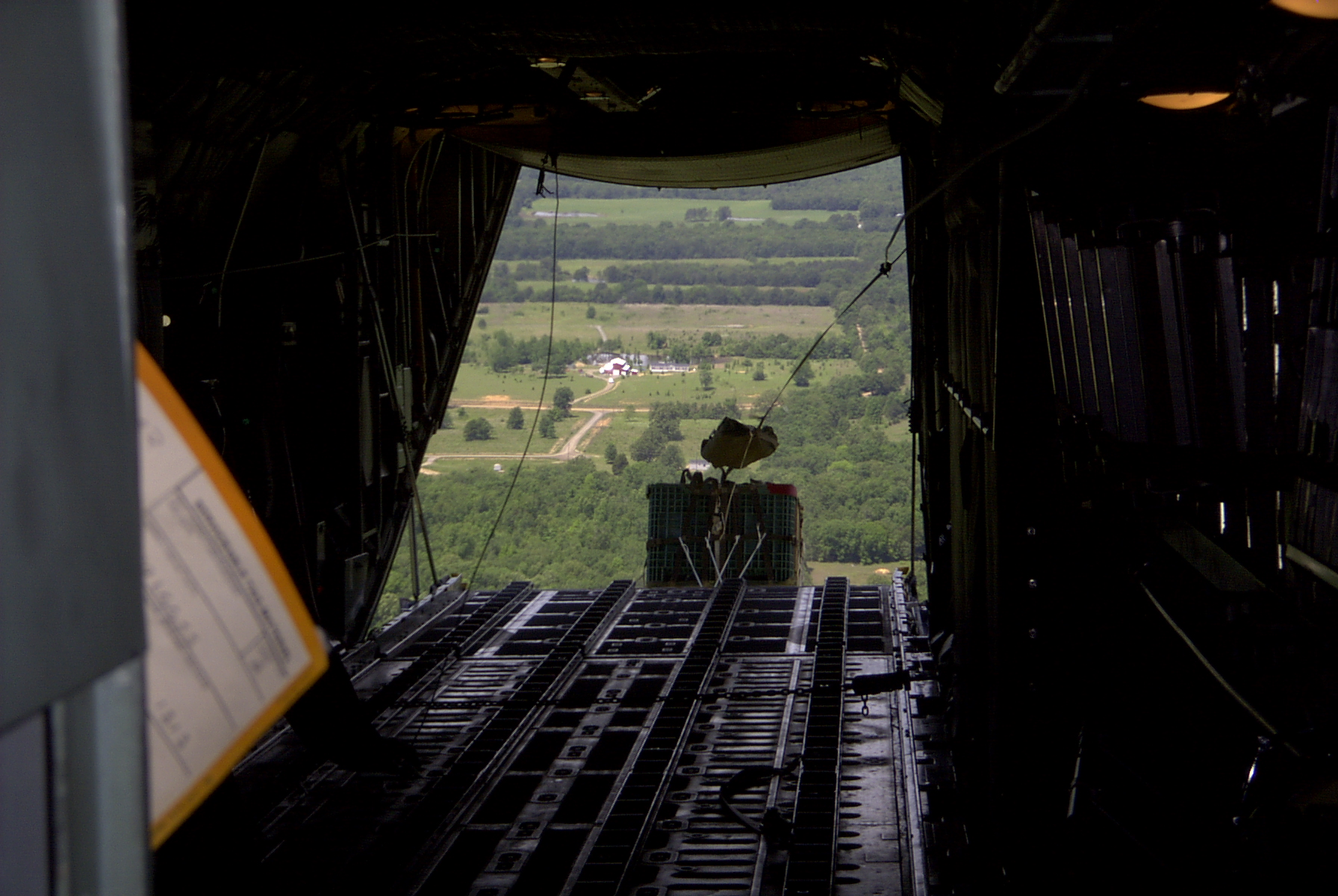
Cargo being dropped off a C-130E operated by the 154th

=== Assignments ===
- Post Headquarters, Kelly Field, 8–18 December 1917
- Post Headquarters, Scott Field, 18 December 1917 – 29 January 1918
- Aviation Concentration Center, 29 January – 16 Feb 1918
- Chief of Air Service, AEF, 9 March – 12 September 1918 (attached to Royal Flying Corps)
- Replacement Concentration Center, AEF, 17–29 September 1918
- Air Service Acceptance Park No. 1, AEF, 29 September – 18 December 1918
- Unknown, 18 December 1918 – 23 January 1919
- Aviation Concentration Center, 23 January – 1 Feb 1919
- Arkansas National Guard (corps aviation), 24 October 1925
- Eighth Corps Area, 16 September 1940
- Third Army, 3 October 1940
- VIII Army Corps, c. Nov 1940
- 68th Observation Group (later 68th Reconnaissance Group, 68th Tactical Reconnaissance Group), 1 September 1941 (attached to XII Air Support Command, 12 March – 24 May 1943, Northwest African Training Command, 24 May – 1 Sep 1943, XII Training Command [Provisional], 1 September-31 Dec 1943, Fifteenth Air Force, 1 January – 15 Jun 1944)
- Fifteenth Air Force, 15 June 1944
- HQ Army Air Forces, Jul 1945
- Third Air Force, 21 July – 12 Dec 1945
- 71st Fighter Wing, 27 May 1946
- 118th Fighter Group (later 118th Composite Group), 2 October 1947
- 136th Fighter-Bomber Group, 10 October 1950 – 10 July 1952
- 118th Tactical Reconnaissance Group, 10 July 1952
- Arkansas Air National Guard, 1 April 1961

Attached to: 118th Air Transport Group, 1 April 1961 – 1 October 1962

- 189th Tactical Reconnaissance Group, 1 October 1962
- 123d Tactical Reconnaissance Wing, 26 January 1968 – 20 December 1968
- 189th Air Refueling Group (later 189th Tactical Airlift Group), 1 January 1976
- 189th Operations Group, 16 April 1992 – present

=== Stations ===
- Kelly Field, Texas, 8 December 1917
- Scott Field, Illinois, 18 December 1917
- Aviation Concentration Center, Garden City, New York, 29 January – 16 Feb 1918
- RFC Larkhill, Wiltshire, England, 9 March 1918
- RFC Stockbridge, Hampshire, England, 19 March 1918

Detachments at Eastbourne and Dover, England, after 16 August 1918

- Winchester, England, 30 August – 12 Sep 1918
- St. Maixent Replacement Barracks, France, 17 September 1918
- Orly Airport, France, 29 September 1918
- Nantes, France, 18 December 1918
- St Nazaire, Frame, 26 December 1918 – c. 12 January 1919
- Camp Mills, Garden City, New York, c. 23 January – 1 Feb 1919
- Adams Field, Arkansas, 24 October 1925
- Post Field, Oklahoma, 27 September 1940
- Eglin Field, Florida, 19 December 1941
- Daniel Field, Georgia, 9 February 1942
- Smith Reynolds Airport, North Carolina, 9 July 1942
- Morris Field, North Carolina, 17 August – 22 Sep 1942
- RAF Wattisham (AAF-377), England, 4–21 October 1942
- Saint-Leu Airfield, Algeria, 10 November 1942
- Tafaraoui Airfield, Oran, Algeria, 16 November 1942
- Blida Airport, Algeria, 20 November 1942
- Oujda Airfield, French Morocco, 10 December 1942 (Detachment at: Youks-les-Bains Airfield, Algeria, from 21 January 1943)
- Youks-les-Bains Airfield, Algeria, 24 February 1943
- Thelepte Airfield, Tunisia, 13 March 1943
- La Sebala Airfield, Tunisia, 6 April 1943
- Le Sers Airfield, Tunisia, 12 April 1943
- Korba Airfield, Tunisia, 19 May 1943
- Nouvion Airfield, Algeria, 3 June 1943
- La Senia Airfield, Oran, Algeria, 5–16 January 1944
- Bari Airfield, Italy, 3 February 1944 – c. 1 July 1945
- Drew Field, Florida, 21 July-12 Dec 1945
- Adams Field, Arkansas, 27 May 1946 – October 1950
- Itazuke Air Base, Japan, 10 October 1950 – 10 July 1952 (deployed to: Taegu AB (K-2), South Korea (undetermined dates))
- Adams Field (later Little Rock Air Force Base), Arkansas, 10 July 1952 – 25 January 1968
- Richards-Gebaur Air Force Base, Missouri, 26 January 1968 – 9 June 1969
- Little Rock AFB, Arkansas, 1 January 1976 – present

=== Aircraft ===
- Not equipped, 1925–1926
- Included JN-4, JN-6, DH-4, PT-1, BT-1, and O-2 during period 1926–1934
- Primarily O-38, c. 1933–1939
- O-47, 1938–1942
- Included O-38 to 1941 and O-49, 1941–1942
- A-20 Havoc, 1942–1943
- In addition to P-39 Airacobra and F-4 Lightning
- P-51 Mustang, 1943
- P-38 Lightning, 1944–1945
- F-51 Mustang, 1946–1950
- F-84E Thunderjet, 1950–1952
- RF-80A, 1954–1957
- RF-84F Thunderstreak, 1957–1958
- RB-57B, 1958–1959
- RB-57A and RB-57A-1, 1959–1965
- RF-101G Voodoo – 1965–1969
- RF-101C Voodoo, 1969–1973
- KC-135 Stratotanker, 1973–1986
- C-130 Hercules, 1986–present

== See also ==
- Earl T. Ricks
- List of American aero squadrons
- List of observation squadrons of the United States Army National Guard
- Winston P. Wilson
