= 189th Airlift Wing =

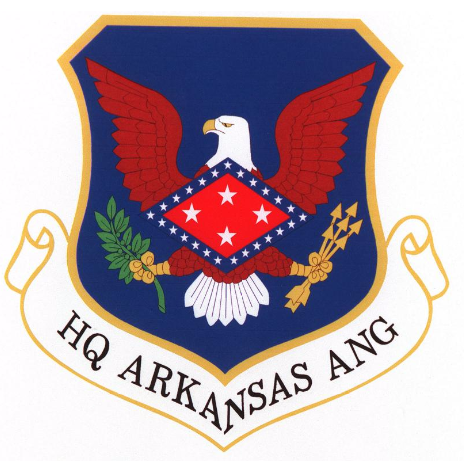
189th Airlift Wing

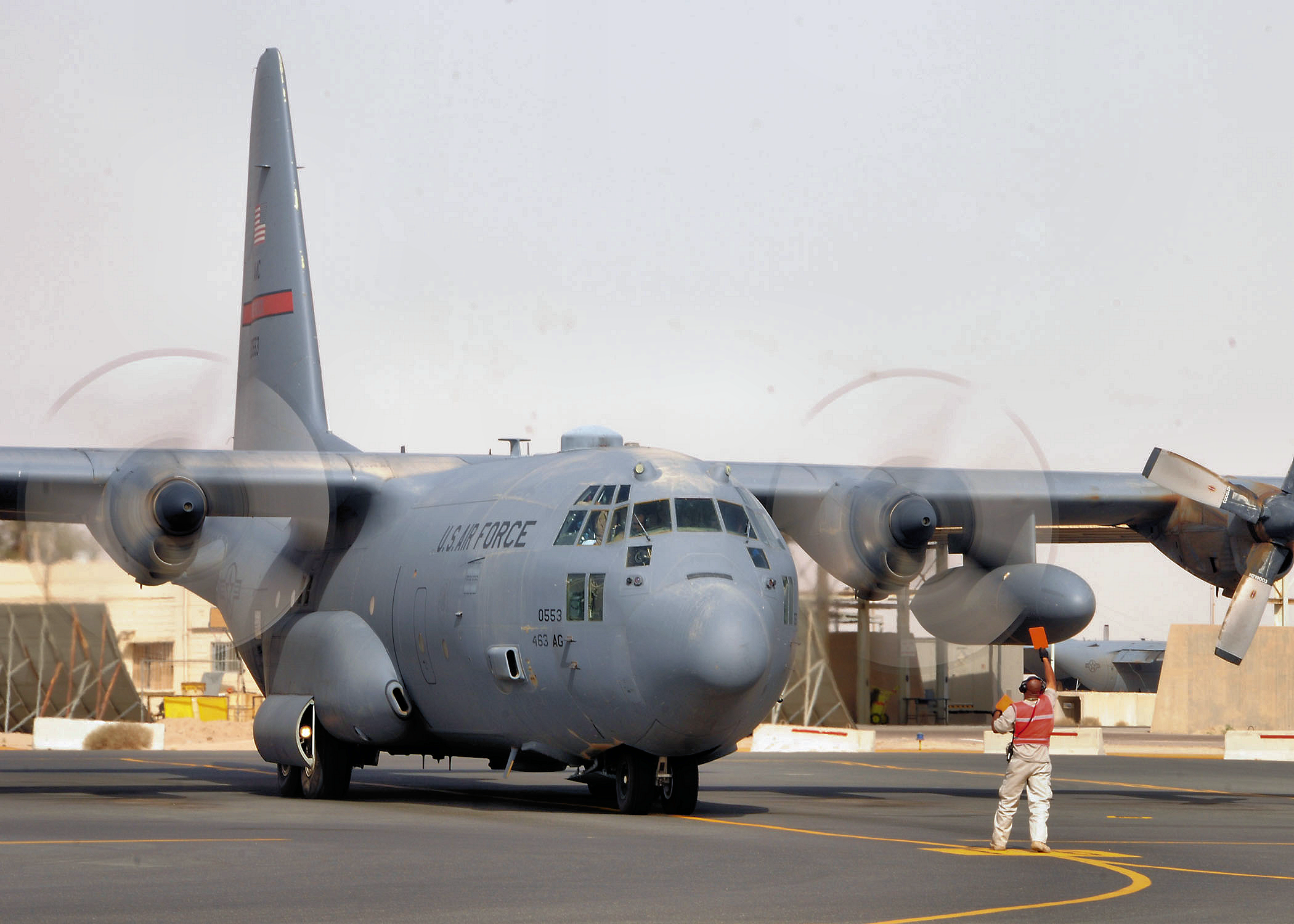
- A 189th Airlift Wing C-130H while deployed to Balad AB, Iraq
- Active: 1962 – present
- Country: United States
- Allegiance: Arkansas
- Branch: Air National Guard
- Type: Wing
- Role: Airlift training
- Part of: Arkansas Air National Guard
- Garrison/HQ: Little Rock Air Force Base, Arkansas
- Motto: Ducimus (Latin for 'We Lead')
- Decorations: Air Force Outstanding Unit Award

Commanders
- Current commander: Col. Joseph P. Geaney
- Deputy Commander: Col. Gregory D. Johnson
- Command Chief: CCM Herbert “Glen” Bates, Jr.

Insignia
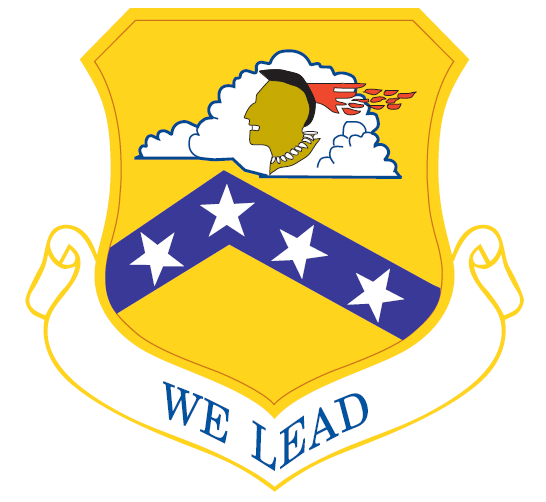
- 189th Airlift Wing emblem
- Tail C=code: Red tail stripe "Arkansas" in white

The 189th Airlift Wing is a unit of the Arkansas Air National Guard, stationed at Little Rock Air Force Base, Arkansas. If activated to federal service, it is gained by the United States Air Force Air Education and Training Command.

The 154th Training Squadron, assigned to the Wings 189th Operations Group, is a descendant organization of the World War I 154th Aero Squadron, established on 8 December 1917. It was reformed on 24 October 1925 as the 154th Observation Squadron, and is one of the 29 original National Guard Observation Squadrons of the United States Army National Guard formed before World War II.

== Mission ==
"Mission of the 189th Airlift Wing:189th Airlift Wing: We are mission ready citizen airmen, providing premier training to the C-130 and cyber enterprises, capitalizing on partnerships to support the State and defend the Nation."

The 189th Airlift Wing provides training in various mission sets for USAF, USSF, and International Military Partners. The 189th AW provides aircrew training for the Lockheed C-130 Hercules for all branches of the military. The unit operates the C-130 Tactical Airlift Instructor School, where aircrew instructors are trained to they can return to their units and keep members combat ready. The wing also operates the Air National Guard Enlisted Aircrew Academic School, which provides entry-level training for C-130 loadmasters before they are sent to the 314th Airlift Wing for mission qualification training. The school also provides entry-level flight engineer training. In recent years the 189th Operations Group's 223rd Cyberspace Operations Squadron has been designated as the USAF Mission Defense Team Formal Training Unit qualifying Cyberspace Defenders on Defensive Cyberspace Operations Weapon system and tactics, as well as providing Specialized Cyberwarfare courses such as the Intelligence Support to Mission Defense Teams Course, Advanced Host Analysis, Advanced Network Analysis, Tactical Cyber Mission Planning, and ICS/SCADA Analysis training.

== Units ==
The 189th Airlift Wing structure:

- 189th Operations Group

Plans, trains, and executes air and space power for operational levels of war.
189th Operations Support Squadron
154th Training Squadron, C-130H
223rd Cyberspace Operations Squadron

- 189th Maintenance Group

Performs all maintenance on assigned C-130 aircraft.

- 189th Mission Support Group

Encompasses the support and logistic functions for the base. The group includes contracting, civil engineer, communications, security forces, force support and the logistic readiness squadrons.

- 189th Medical Group

189th Aeromedical Dental Squadron
189th Aerospace Medicine Squadron
189th Medical Operations Squadron

== History ==
Established in 1962 when the Arkansas ANG 154th Tactical Reconnaissance Squadron was expanded to a group when elements of the 123d Air Base Group were added.

In June 1965, the group became the first Air National Guard organization to be equipped with McDonnell RF-101 Voodoo aircraft. As a result of the Pueblo Crisis, the 189th was recalled to active duty in January 1968. In July of that year, the 154th Tactical Reconnaissance Squadron (augmented) deployed from Little Rock Air Force Base to Itazuke Air Base, Japan.

=== Air Refueling ===
On 1 January 1976, the unit was designated as the 189th Air Refueling Group, and converted to a Boeing KC-135 Stratotanker air refueling mission, and became one of the first Air National Guard units to be assigned to the Strategic Air Command (SAC) as a gaining command.

As an integral part of SAC under "Total Force," the 189th maintained an around-the-clock ALPHA Alert, participated in European, Alaskan and Pacific Tanker Task Forces, and supported worldwide temporary tanker task forces performing in-flight refueling of all types of aircraft as assigned by the Strategic Air Command.

=== Tactical Airlift ===
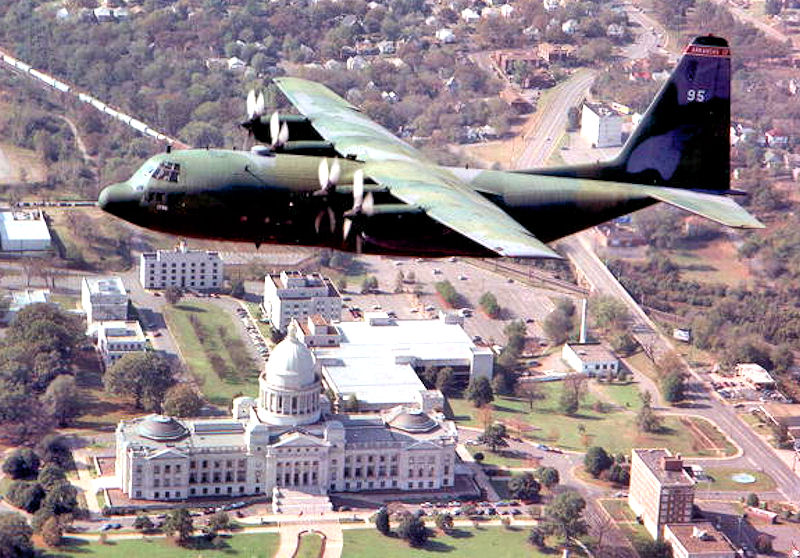
A 189th Airlift Wing C-130 cargo plane flies over the state capitol in Little Rock, Arkansas

On 1 October 1986, the unit was redesignated the 189th Tactical Airlift Group and converted to the C-130 aircraft. The mission squadron was redesignated as the 154th Tactical Airlift Training Squadron and assumed a proportionate share of initial aircrew qualification training, from the 314th Tactical Airlift Wing, Little Rock AFB. Student training began on 25 September 1986.

During Desert Shield/Desert Storm, 135 members were activated and served in both CONUS and OCONUS locations. Aircrews from the 189th flew 123 mission sorties in support of Desert Shield/Desert Storm without affecting the unit's day-to-day aircrew training mission.

On 16 April 1992, the 189th was redesignated as the 189th Airlift Group, and the 154th Tactical Airlift Training Squadron was redesignated as the 154th Training Squadron. On 1 October 1995, the 189th Airlift Group was designated as the 189th Airlift Wing. The 189th AW was the first Air National Guard unit in the country to be located on an active duty Air Force base flying the same type aircraft as its active duty counterpart, and performing the same day-to-day mission. The 189th Airlift Wing transitioned from the C-130E to the C-130H aircraft during 2010. That same year the 189th Airlift Wing was selected as the lead unit for the C-130 AMP (Avionics Modernization Program) transition.

=== Lineage ===
- Designated 189th Tactical Reconnaissance Group and allotted to Arkansas ANG in 1962

Extended federal recognition and activated on 1 October 1962

- Redesignated 189th Air Refueling Group on 1 January 1976

Redesignated 189th Tactical Airlift Group on 1 October 1986
Redesignated 189th Airlift Wing on 1 October 1995

=== Assignments ===
- Arkansas Air National Guard, 1 October 1962 – 1 January 1976

Gained by: Tactical Air Command

- Arkansas Air National Guard, 1 January 1976 – Present

Gained by: Strategic Air Command
Gained by: Military Airlift Command, 1 October 1986
Gained by: Air Mobility Command, 1 June 1992

=== Components ===
- 189th Operations Group, 1 June 1992 – present
- 154th Tactical Reconnaissance Squadron (later 154th Air Refueling Squadron, 154th Tactical Airlift Training Squadron, 154th Training Squadron), 1 October 1962 – 1 June 1992

=== Stations ===
- Little Rock Air Force Base, Arkansas, 1 October 1962 – present

=== Decorations ===
- Air Force Outstanding Unit Award
  - 31 July 1998 – 30 June 2000
