= 223rd Cyberspace Operations Squadron =

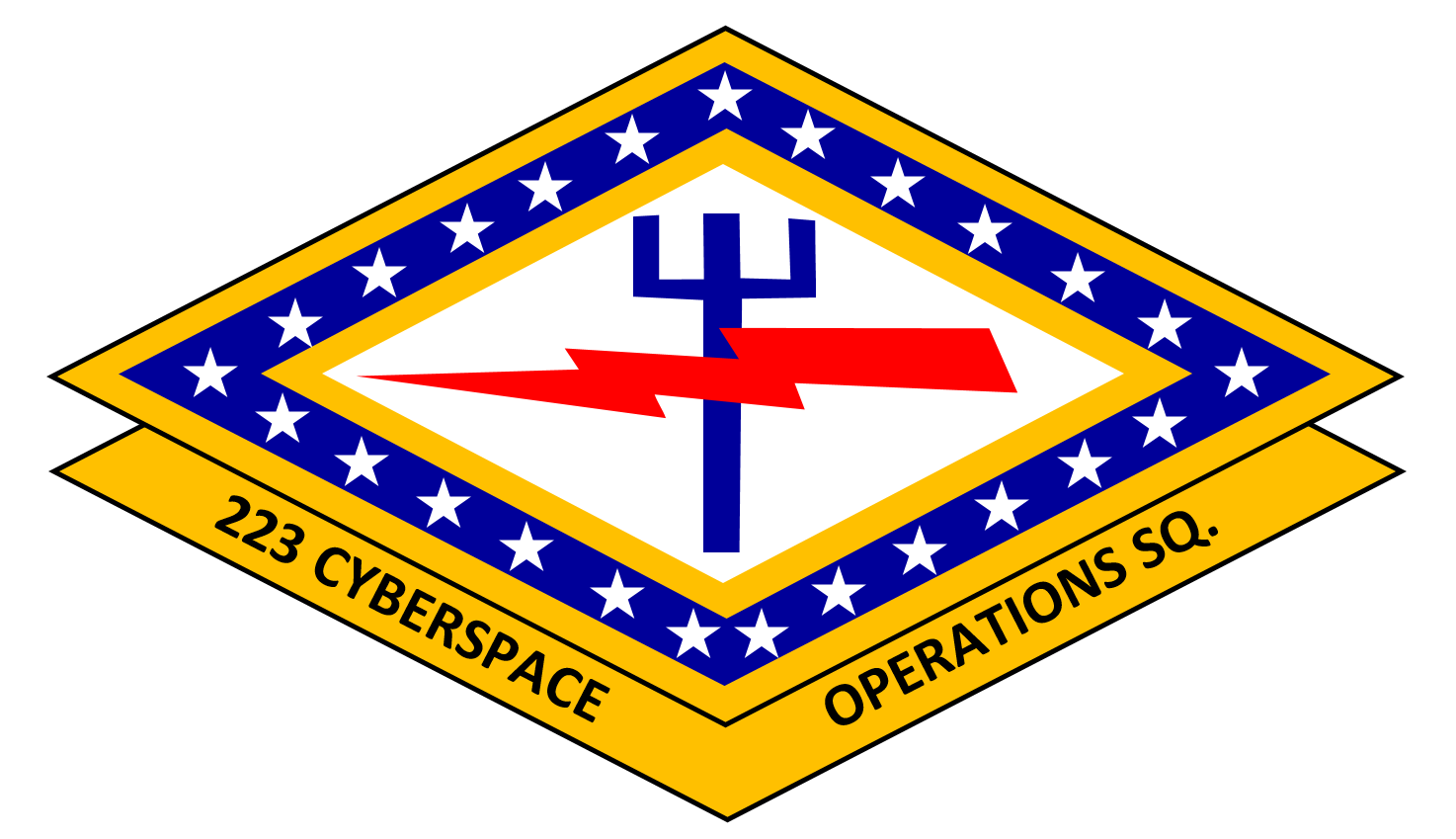
- This is the original, full color scheme unit patch of the 223 COS
- Active: 1953–1968; 1968–2006; 2019–present
- Country: United States
- Allegiance: Arkansas Air National Guard
- Branch: United States Air Force
- Role: Cyberspace operations
- Part of: Air National Guard/189th Operations Group
- Garrison/HQ: Hot Springs ANGS, Arkansas

Commanders
- Current commander: Maj. Jason Kulaga (2020-Present)

Insignia
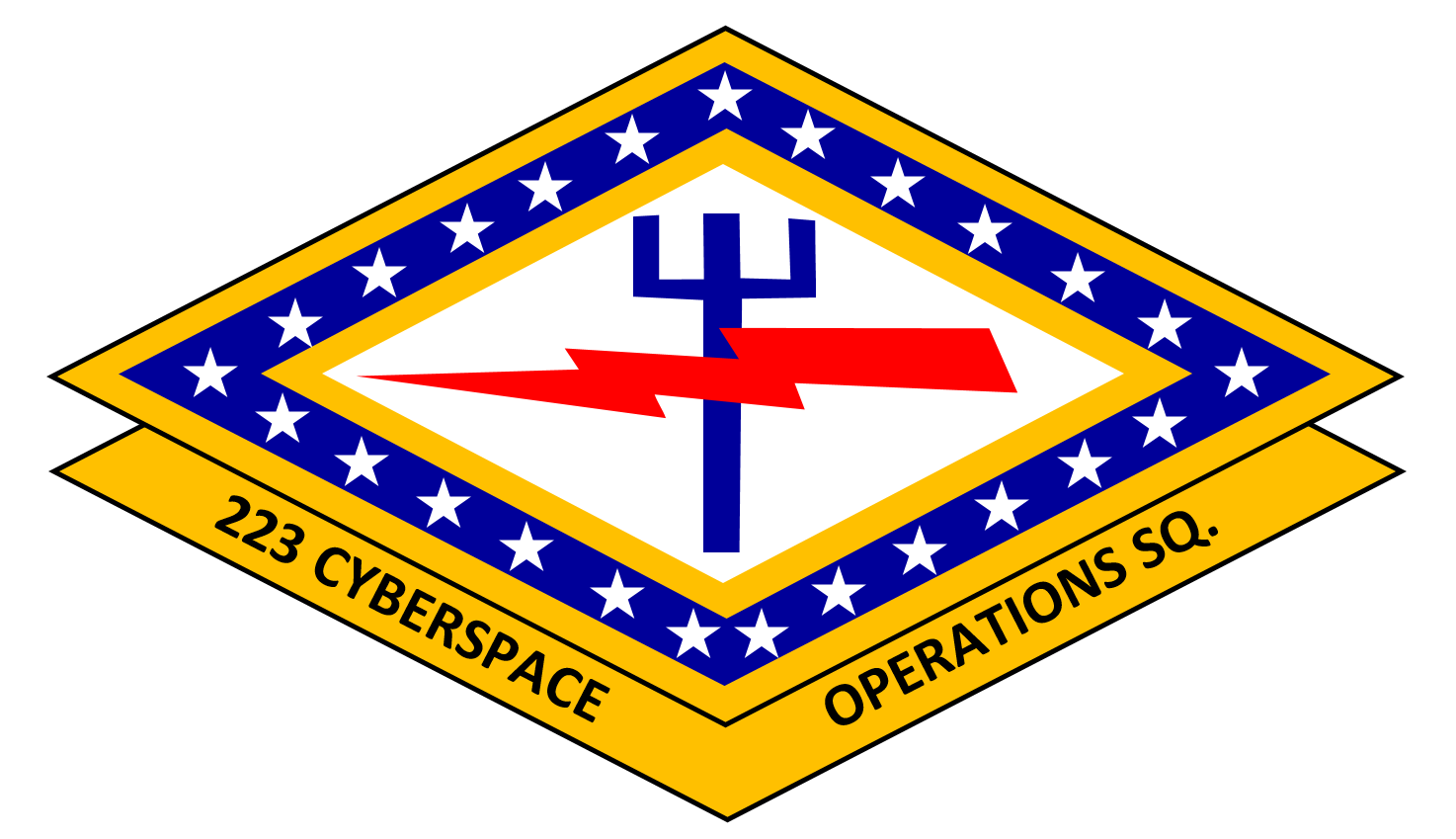
- 223rd Cyberspace Operations Squadron Patch: This is the original, full color scheme unit patch of the 223 COS

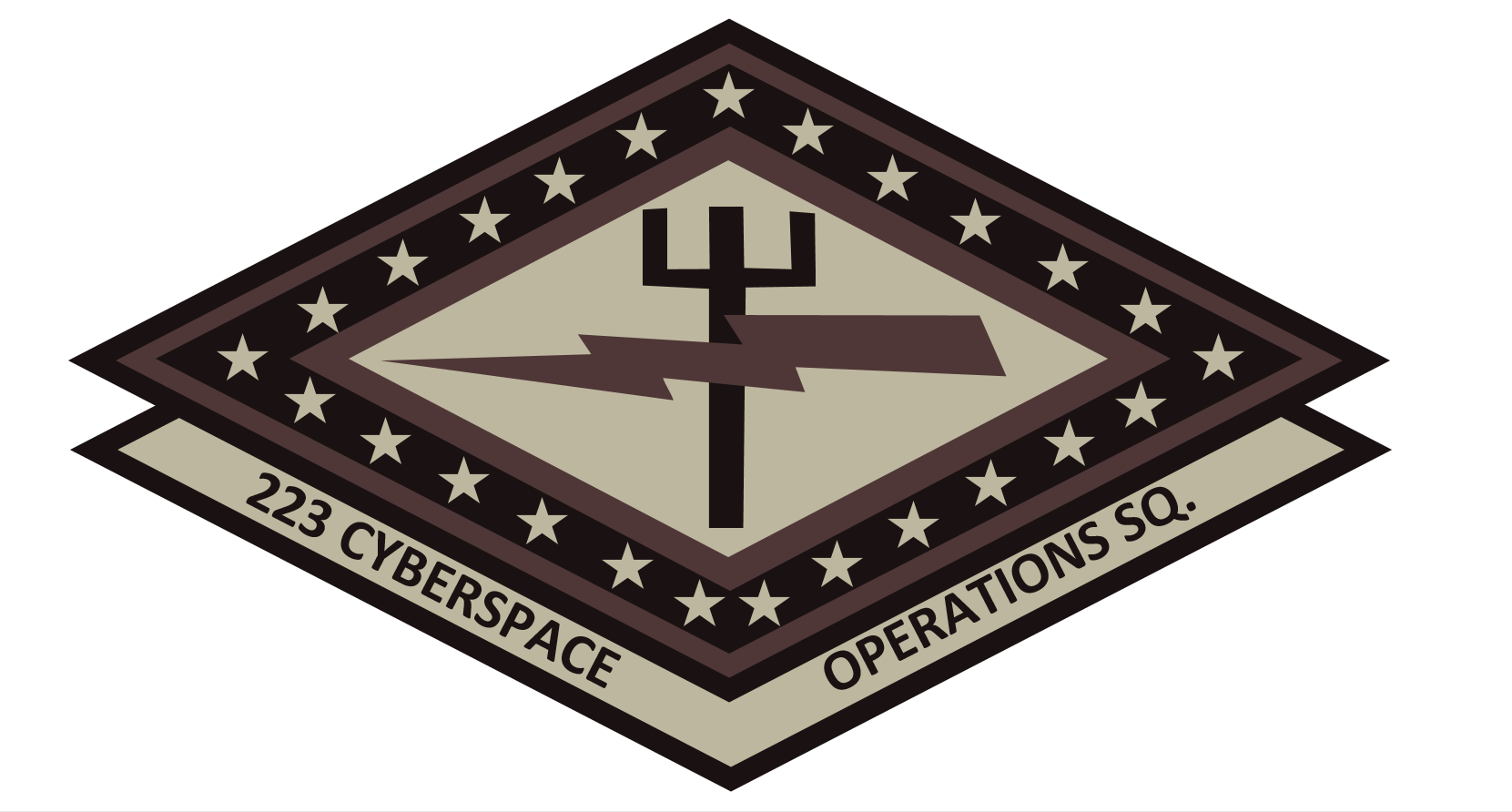
- 223rd Cyberspace Operations Squadron Patch (Subdued OCP): Occupational Camouflage Patter (OCP) Subdued 223 COS Unit Patch

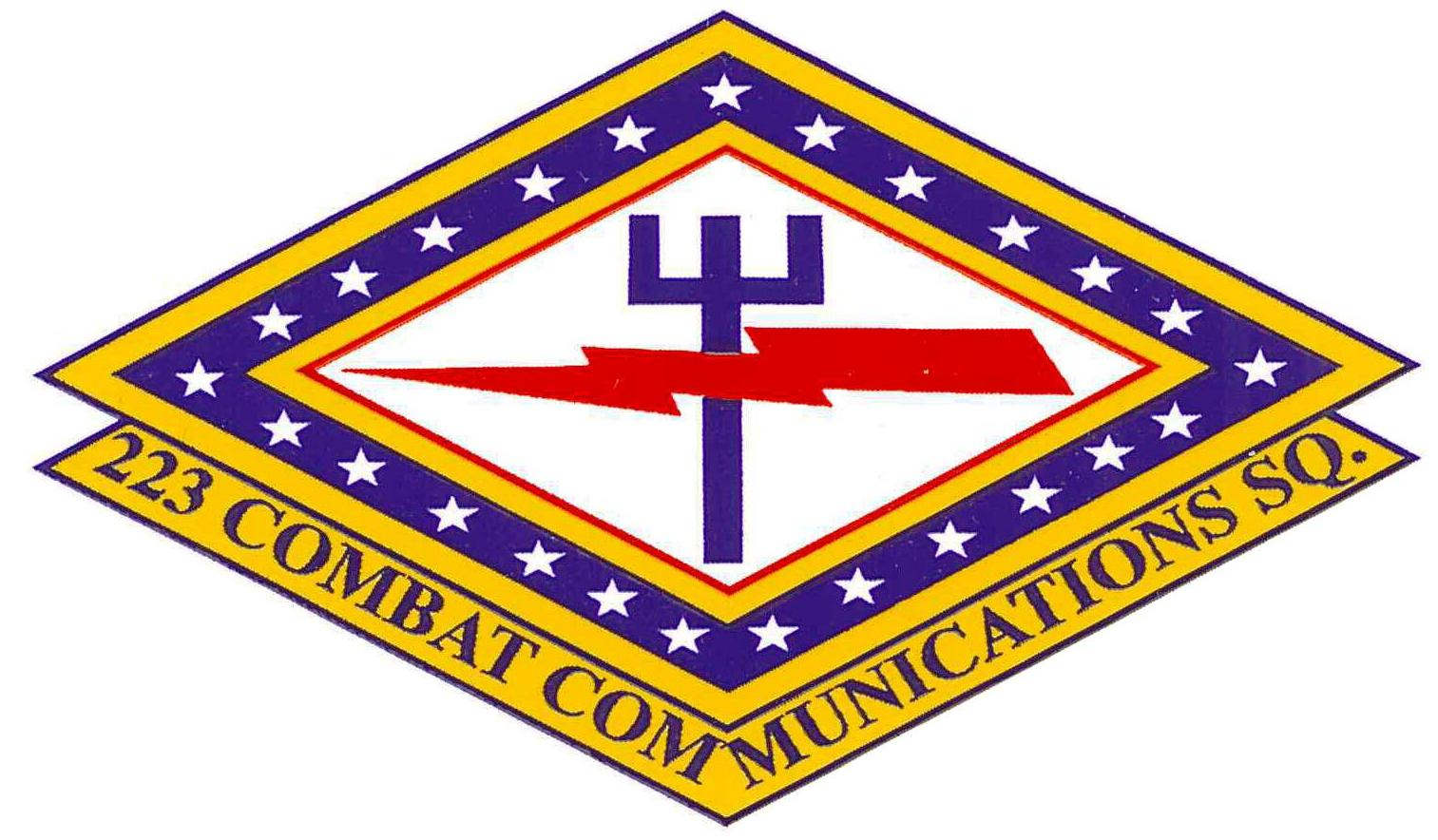
- 223rd Combat Communications Squadron Patch (Inactivated)

The United States Air Force's 223rd Cyberspace Operations Squadron (223 COS) is an Air National Guard Cyberspace Operations unit located at Little Rock Air Force Base, Arkansas.

== Mission ==
The Mission of the 223rd Cyberspace Operations Squadron is to maintain an operational mindset led by members who use agile cyberwarfare instruction to provide qualification training, exercises, and assessments for total force utilizing a diverse ensemble of qualified cyberwarfare operators and cyberspace ranges for the purpose of evolving persistent cyber defense capabilities.

== History ==
The 223rd began as the 8201st Air Base Squadron on 1 May 1952. The 8201st was discontinued on 30 November 1952 and became the 223rd radio Relay Squadron on 1 December 1952. With an authorized strength of four officers and 95 airmen, the 223rd had a mission to install and operate five radio relay stations and three radio terminals under field conditions. First Lt. Joe A. Holbrook became the Commanding Officer of the newly formed unit and held that position until March 1955. The unit was assigned to the Continental Air Command (CONAC), located at Selfridge AFB, Michigan.

Under Lt. Holbrook's command, recruiting took priority and the unit quadrupled in size within months. The unit's first exercise began on 5 July 1953, setting up a base station at the Garland County Municipal Airport and a second site at the Fairgrounds. There call signs were Zekeamoto Alpha and Zekeamoto Extra.

Captain George C. Bolton replaced Lt. Holbrook as commanding officer on 13 March 1955 and would hold that position until 1971. Lt. Holbrook's career with the 223rd was far from over. Through the years he was promoted to the rank of lieutenant colonel, but would later accept a demotion to the enlisted ranks with a rank of master sergeant so that he could remain in the unit. The respect that Joe Holbrook earned in his decades with the unit would earn him the nickname "Sergeant Colonel Holbrook", and his men would proudly admit they continued to call him "Sir" even after joining the enlisted ranks.

The 223rd was federally activated by President Dwight D. Eisenhower on 24 September 1957 to assist in the Little Rock Integration Crisis. During this time, a new building was under construction; the same building they would call home until the unit's closure in 2006. By 1960, the 223rd had gained recognition as a premier Radio Relay Squadron. The unit's manning increased to ten officers and 181 airmen, and they gained Food Services and Medical Services. The ongoing joke at the time was that introduction of both services at the same time was necessary, as you could not have a chow hall without having a medic.

In 1968, the unit's name changed to the 223rd Mobile Communications squadron, as they received Troposcatter radios, High Frequency (HF) radios, a Tactical Communications Center, Technical Control facilities, Tactical Switchboards and Cryptographic functions. Four months after receiving this equipment, virtually unseen by any member of the unit only months earlier, the 223rd took the Commanding Role in exercise Guard Strike 2.

The unit continued to grow, its inventory expanding and its members' grasp of communications becoming sharper. By 1990, Lt. Col. Marc W. Barber, the former enlisted Air Advisor for the unit, became the commanding officer. His vision for the unit took it in new directions. After dozens of highly successful exercises and operations, the 223rd, now a Combat Communication Squadron, partnered with the C2TIG, or Command And Control Training and Integration Group at Hurlburt Field, Florida. This partnership led to the development of new equipment, new missions and new ways of doing business; many of these new concepts were quickly adopted throughout the military and are standard practices today.

The decision to close the 223rd in 2006 was a financial one. The 189th Airlift Wing in Little Rock, Arkansas and the 188th Fighter Wing in Fort Smith gained many new personnel positions by this closure, as well additional equipment. During its history, over 4000 individuals signed the dotted line to become a member of the 223rd. Many came from active duty, representing all branches of the military, while many started and ended their careers with the unit.

In 2019, the 223rd was resurrected as the 223rd Cyberspace Operations Squadron. Its Commander, Major Jason Kulaga, assumed command of the 223rd COS in 2020.

== Lineage ==
8201st Air Base Squadron

- Designated and organized 1 May 1952

Discontinued 30 November 1952

223rd Radio Relay Squadron

- Constituted as the 223rd Radio Relay Squadron and allotted to the Air National Guard

Activated on 1 December 1952
Called to active service on 24 September 1957
Returned to state control c. October 1957
Inactivated 15 March 1968

223rd Cyberspace Operations Squadron

- Constituted as the 223rd Mobile Communications Squadron (Contingency) on 1 March 1968

Activated on 15 March 1968
Redesignated 223rd Combat Communications Squadron (Contingency) on 1 April 1976
Redesignated 223rd Combat Information Systems Squadron on 1 July 1985
Redesignated 223rd Combat Communications Squadron on 1 October 1986
Inactivated c. 2006

- Redesignated 223rd Cyberspace Operations Squadron

Activated c. 9 June 2019
Redesignated 223rd Intelligence Support Squadron

=== Assignments ===
- Arkansas Air National Guard, 1 May 1952 – 30 November 1952
- 251st Communications Group, 1 December 1952
- Fourteenth Air Force, 24 September 1957
- 251st Communications Group (later 251st Mobile Communications Group), c. October 1957 – 15 March 1968
- 251st Mobile Communications Group, 15 March 1968 – 1971
- 254th Mobile Communications Group (later 251st Combat Communications Group, 251st Combat Information Systems Group, 254th Combat Communications Group), 1971 – 2006
- 189th Operations Group, c. 9 July 2019
- 188th Intelligence, Surveillance, and Reconnaissance Group

=== Stations ===
- Little Rock AFB, 2016–Present
- Hot Springs Memorial Airport, 1 May 1952 – 30 November 1952
- Hot Springs Memorial Airport, 1 December 1952
- Camp Garrity, 24 September 1957
- Hot Springs Memorial Airport, c. October 1957 – 15 March 1968
- Hot Springs Memorial Airport, 15 March 1968 – c. 2006
- Ebbing Air National Guard Base, c. 9 June 2019 – present

=== Mobilization Gaining Command ===
- Continental Air Command (1952–1960)
- Airways and Air Communications Service (later Air Force Communications Service, Air Force Communications Command) (1960–1992)
- Air Combat Command (1992–2006, 2019–present)

=== Commanders ===
- Maj. Jason Kulaga (2020–Present)
- Lt. Col. Eroica Boone (2019-2020)
- Major Scott A. Anderson (2018-2019)
- Lt. Col. Eric Polta (2016-2018)
- Lt. Col. Philip Z. Horton (2000–)
- Lt. Col. Marc W. Barber (1990–2000)
- Major Ralph Van Cleve ( 1987–1990)
- Lt. Col. William E. Titus (1986–1987)
- Lt. Col. Ray E. Garner (1981–1986)
- Lt. Col. Alvin A. Albinson ( 1973–1981)
- Major Glen W. "Bill" Crone (1972–1973)
- Major Thomas G. Haggard (1971–1972)
- Lt. Col. George C. Bolton (1955–1971)
- Lt. Col. Joe A. Holbrook (1952–1955)
- Lt. Richard H. Scheibel (1952)

=== Decorations ===
- Air Force Outstanding Unit Award
