= Little Rock Air Force Base =

Air base in Arkansas, United States

- Jacksonville, Arkansas in United States of America
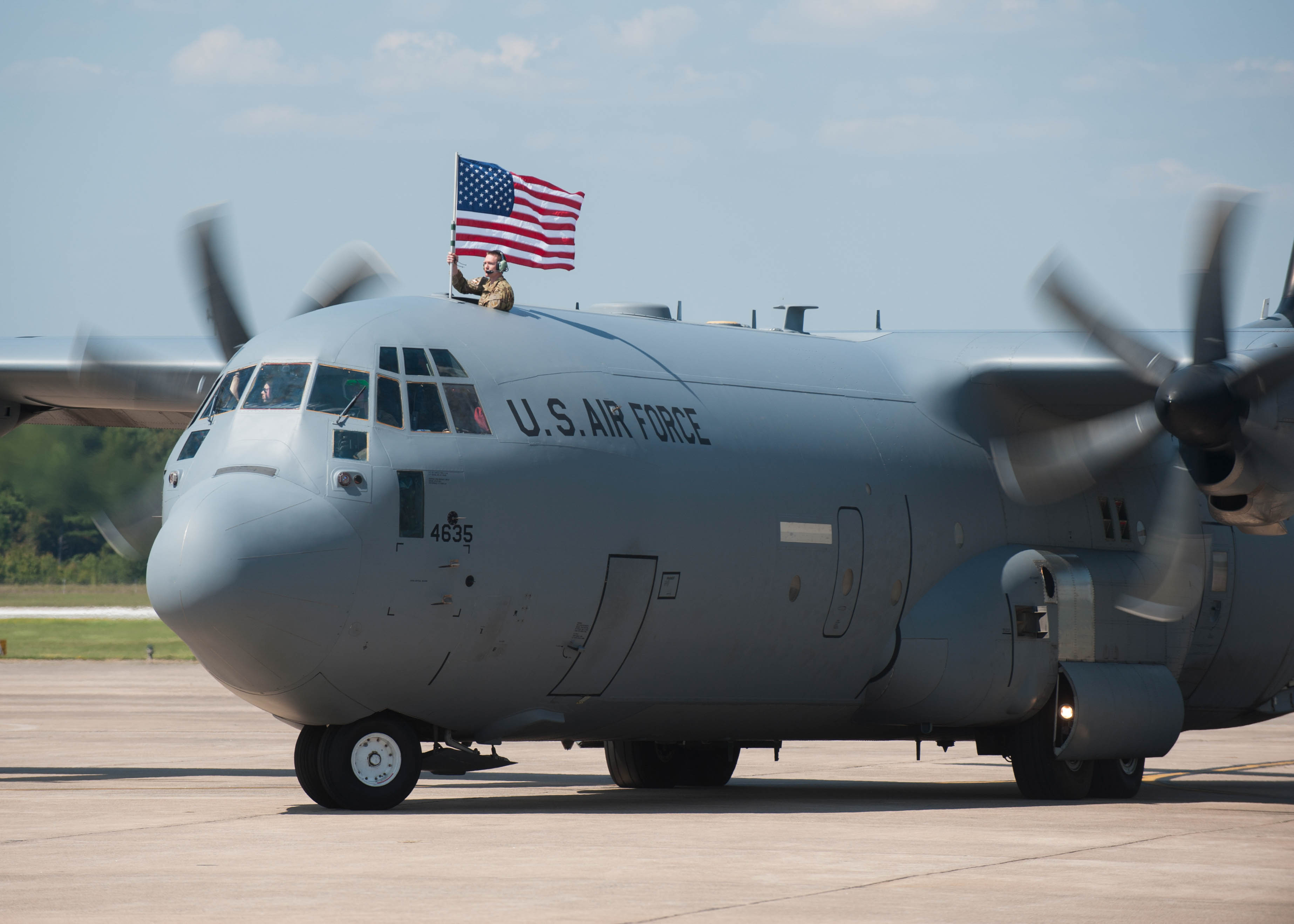
- A C-130J Super Hercules taxis onto the flight line at Little Rock AFB after returning from supporting operations in Southwest Asia in September 2015.

Site information
- Type: US Air Force base
- Owner: Department of Defense
- Operator: US Air Force
- Controlled by: Air Mobility Command (AMC)
- Condition: Operational
- Website: www.littlerock.af.mil

Location
- Location within North America Location within the United States Location within Arkansas
- Coordinates: 34°55′01″N 092°08′47″W

Site history
- Built: 1953 – 1955
- In use: 1955 – present

Garrison information
- Current commander: Colonel Denny R. Davies
- Garrison: 19th Airlift Wing (host); 189th Airlift Wing; 314th Airlift Wing; 913th Airlift Group

Airfield information
- Identifiers: IATA: LRF, ICAO: KLRF, FAA LID: LRF, WMO: 723405
- Elevation: 94.4 metres (310 ft) AMSL
Runways
Direction	Length and surface
07/25	3,659.7 metres (12,007 ft) concrete

Little Rock Air Force Base (IATA: LRF, ICAO: KLRF, FAA LID: LRF) is a United States Air Force base located in Jacksonville, Arkansas, approximately 17 miles (27 km) northeast of Little Rock.

The facility covers 6,217 acres (2,516 ha) with a resident population of over 3,300 and working population of approximately 7,200.

Little Rock AFB is the primary C-130 Hercules training base for the Department of Defense, training C-130 pilots, navigators, flight engineers, and loadmasters from all branches of the US military in tactical airlift and aerial delivery. It is home to C-130H and C-130J aircraft, as well as the C-130 Center of Excellence (i.e., schools for C-130H and C-130J crews).

The host unit at Little Rock AFB is the 19th Airlift Wing (19 AW), assigned to the Air Mobility Command's 18th Air Force. The wing provides the Department of Defense the largest C-130 Hercules transport fleet in the world, supplying humanitarian airlift relief to victims of disasters, as well as airdropping supplies and troops into the heart of contingency operations in hostile areas.

Other organizations at Little Rock AFB include the 189th Airlift Wing of the Arkansas Air National Guard, and the C-130 division of the U.S. Air Force Weapons School. All of these organizations fly the C-130 Hercules.

Little Rock Air Force Base is the fourth largest employer in the state of Arkansas, with a local economic impact of $813.6 million.

== History ==
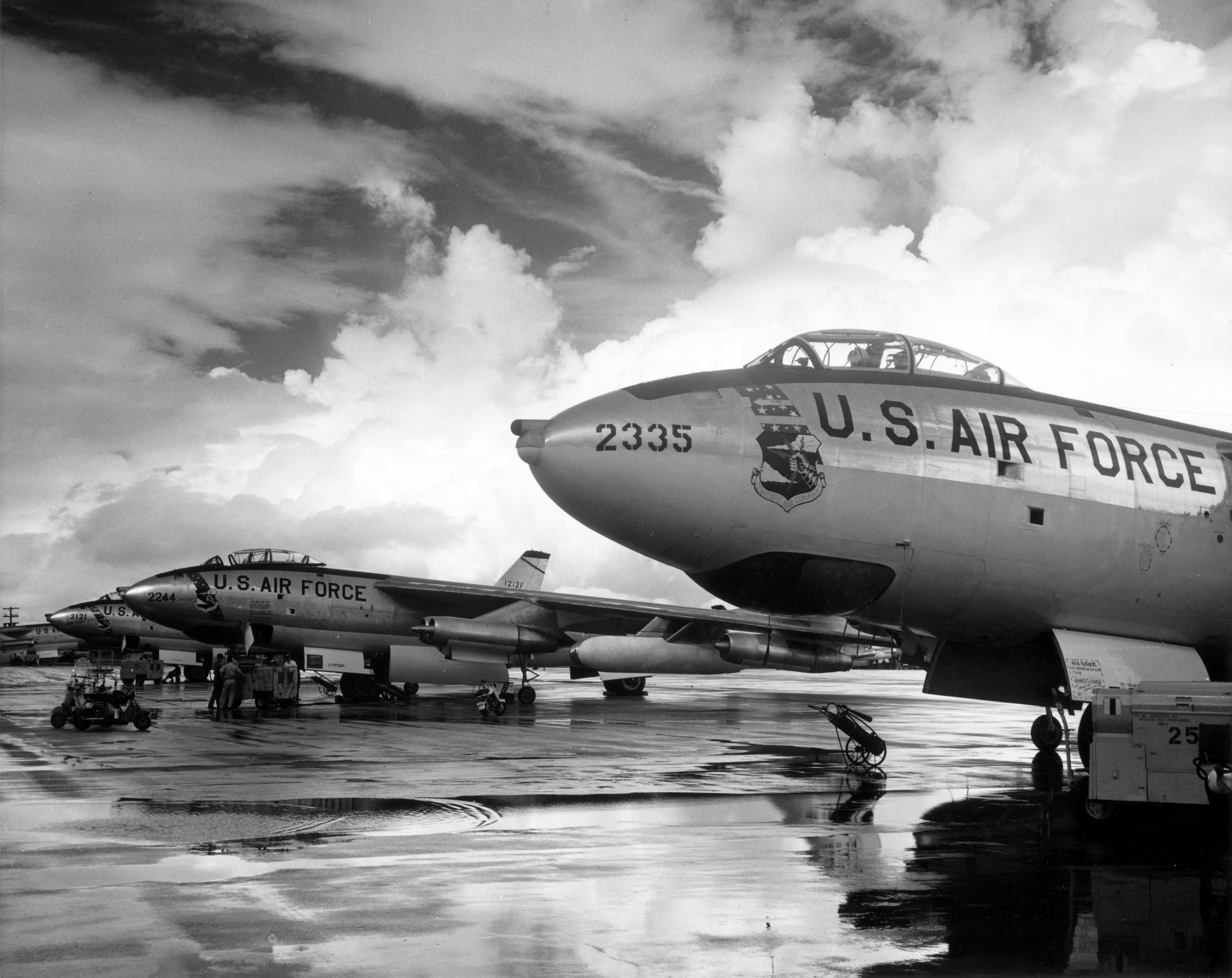
SAC B-47s on the flight line

Little Rock Air Force Base was authorized in 1953 and construction began on 6 November 1953.

The base opened on 24 January 1955 with 6,100 acres donated by landowners, valued at $1.2 million in 1952. Communications and several storage buildings, JATO facility, ordnance igloos, track and loading platform were completed by 30 June 1955, and the base was opened to limited air traffic on 9 September 1955. The base headquarters facility was accepted 31 January 1956, and all runways and other operational concrete areas were completed by January 1957.

The base was officially activated by Strategic Air Command (SAC) on 1 August 1955, hosting SAC's 384th Bombardment Wing (384 BW) flying the Boeing B-47E Stratojet, and the 70th Reconnaissance Wing (70 RW) flying the RB-47 Stratojet and KC-97 Stratofreighter.

In 1960, the Air Force announced that Little Rock Air Force Base would house 18 Titan II Intercontinental Ballistic Missiles located throughout the state of Arkansas. In 1961, the 70 RW was redesignated as the 70th Bombardment Wing (Medium) and converted to the B-47, but was inactivated the following year before being declared combat-ready.

In September 1962, the 154th Tactical Reconnaissance Squadron of the Arkansas Air National Guard relocated to Little Rock AFB and reorganized as the 189th Tactical Reconnaissance Group (189 TRG).

In October 1962, the 384th Bomb Wing deployed 11 Boeing B-47 Stratojet aircraft to civilian municipal airports around the nation for dispersal alert purposes during the Cuban Missile Crisis. Also in 1962, SAC established the 308th Strategic Missile Wing (308 SMW) as the host organization for Little Rock AFB's Titan II missile operations, with the first of the Titan II missiles installed at a site in Searcy, Arkansas in February 1963.

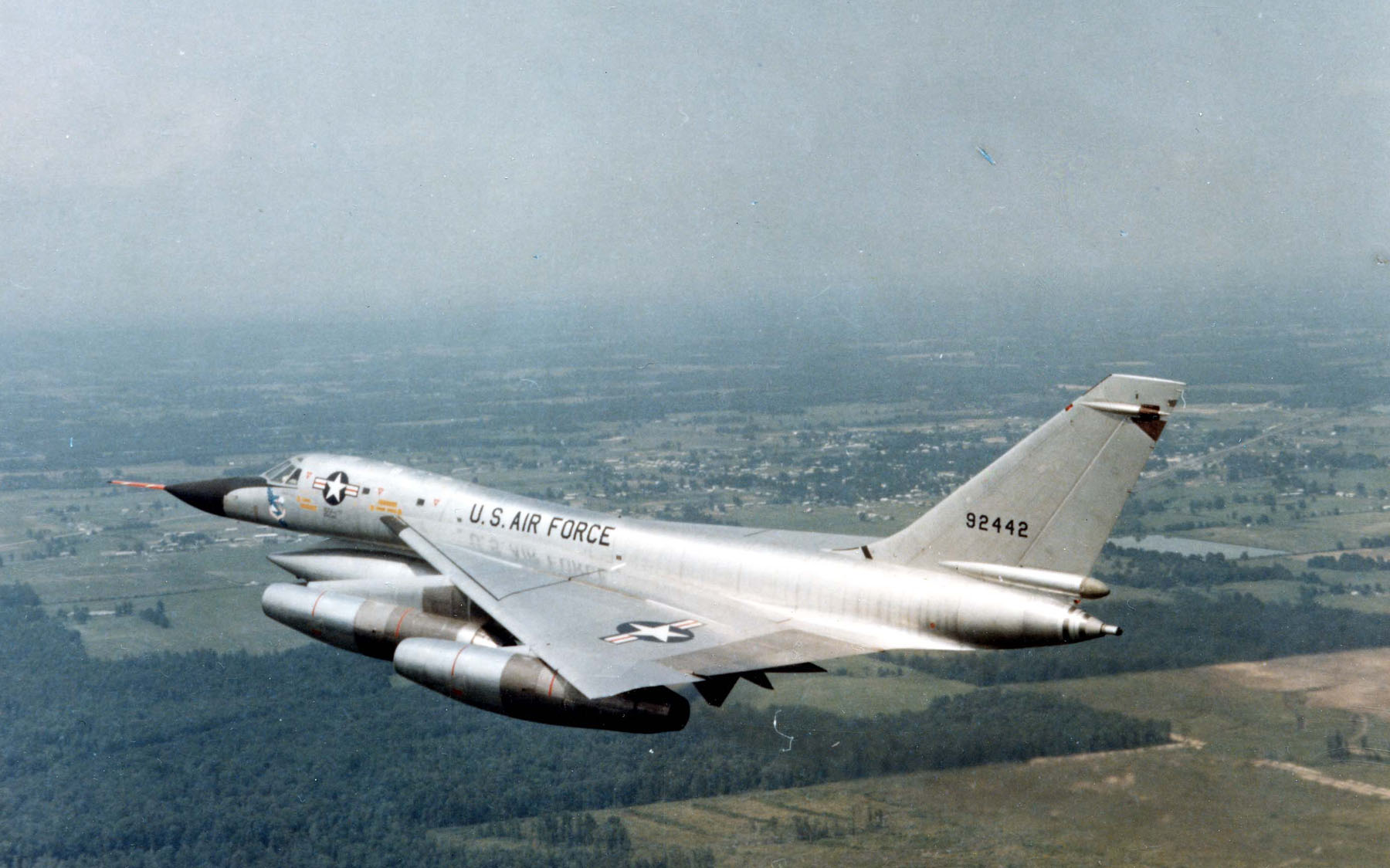
B-58A in flight, June 1967

In September 1964, the 384th Bomb Wing inactivated following the retirement of the B-47 from front-line service in SAC. That same year, SAC's 43d Bombardment Wing transferred from Carswell AFB, Texas with its B-58 Hustler supersonic aircraft. The 43d Bomb Wing would continue to operate at Little Rock until the B-58s were withdrawn from operational service in January 1970.

In June 1965, Little Rock's 189 TRG became the first Air National Guard unit to operate the RF-101 Voodoo and by December, had assumed the RF-101 Replacement Training Unit (RTU) mission for the entire Air Force. The same year, the base and associated flying units also participated in various relief efforts such as a tornado that ripped through Conway, Arkansas in April and Hurricane Betsy in Louisiana in September.

In the 1970s the base went through significant changes, with the first C-130 Hercules aircraft arriving in March 1970. On 31 March 1970, Little Rock Air Force Base officially transferred from SAC to Tactical Air Command (TAC), with TAC's 314th Tactical Airlift Wing (314 TAW) taking over host wing responsibilities. Although SAC's 308 SMW and its Titan II ICBMs continued to be a major tenant, the base's primary mission became C-130 tactical airlift operations and training, with two operational C-130 squadrons assigned and two C-130 training squadrons assigned. In 1974, following the divestiture of C-130 tactical airlift aircraft from TAC, both the 314 TAW and Little Rock AFB transferred from TAC control to that of the Military Airlift Command (MAC).

On 1 January 1976, the 189 TRG transferred being a TAC-gained unit to a SAC-gained unit when it converted to the KC-135 Stratotanker and was redesignated the 189th Air Refueling Group (189 ARG), becoming one of the first Air National Guard units to be assigned to Strategic Air Command with a concomitant requirement to maintain a 24-hour alert force at Little Rock as well as deployments to support worldwide tanker task forces.

=== Damascus incident ===
On 18 September 1980, an airman conducting maintenance on a USAF Titan II missile at Little Rock Air Force Base's Launch Complex 374-7 in Southside (Van Buren County), just north of Damascus, Arkansas, dropped a socket, which fell, impacting the rocket's first stage fuel tank and resulting in a leak. In response, evacuations were made in the area. The leaking fuel exploded on 19 September. The force of the blast resulted in the W53 nuclear warhead being hurled about 100 feet (30 m) from the launch complex's entry gate; its safety features operated correctly and prevented any loss of radioactive material. An Air Force airman was killed and the launch complex was destroyed.

=== Recent years ===
On 1 October 1986, the 189 ARG saw yet another mission change when it was redesignated as the 189th Tactical Airlift Group (189 TAG) and converted to the C-130 aircraft, with transfer of operational claimancy to MAC.

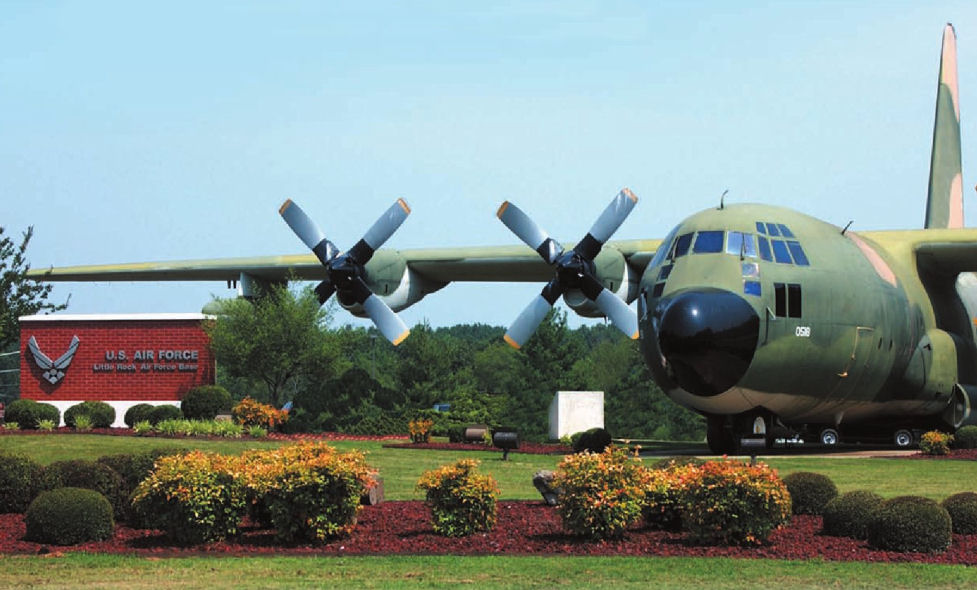
Main entrance, Little Rock AFB

During the 1991 Gulf War, the 314 TAW's two operational C-130 squadrons and the 189 TAG's C-130 squadron supported operations from both the middle east and European theaters. Later that year, the 314th Tactical Airlift Wing was redesignated as the 314th Airlift Wing (314 AW), and following the disestablishment of MAC in 1992, the base and the 314 AW were transferred to the new Air Mobility Command (AMC). The 189 TAG was also redesignated as the 189th Airlift Group (189 AG) the same year, followed by redesignation as the 189th Airlift Wing (189 AW) in 1995.

In 1993, the base and the 314 AW transferred to Air Combat Command (ACC), as part the U.S. Air Force's decision to transfer continental U.S.-based C-130s from AMC to ACC. In 1997, the U.S. Air Force reversed this decision, returning most C-130 airlift back to AMC claimancy. However, given the 314 AW's primary training mission as the Formal Training Unit (FTU) for C-130s, the base and the 314 AW were transferred to the Air Education and Training Command (AETC), and the base's two operational Regular Air Force C-130 squadrons were organized under the 463d Airlift Group, an AMC unit.

From the mid-1990s to the late 1990s, the 314 AW and the 463 AG supported the air war over Serbia and since the September 11, 2001 attacks, the 463 AG has supported both Operation Enduring Freedom and Operation Iraqi Freedom until the 463 AG was inactivated on 1 October 2008.

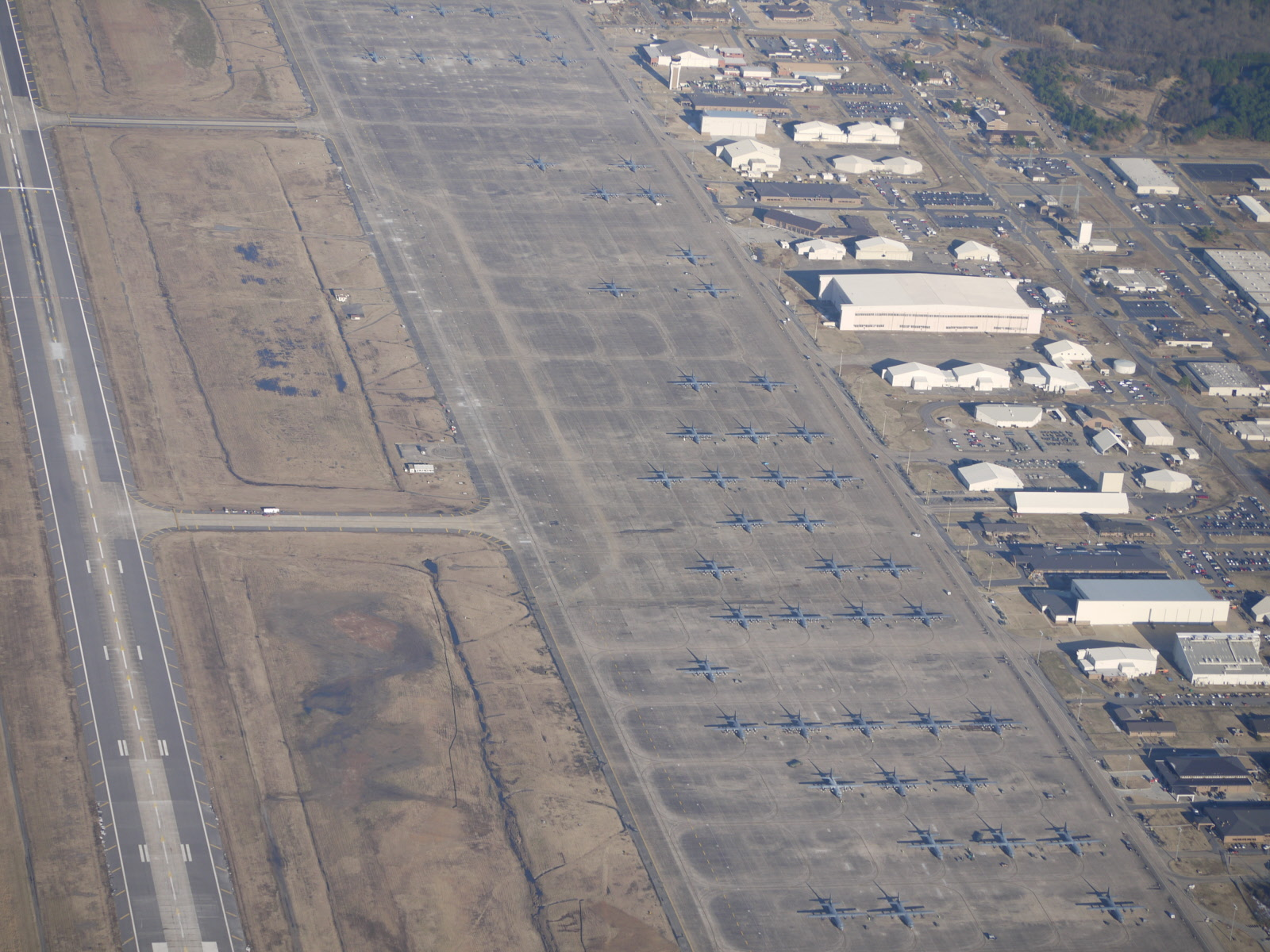
Little Rock AFB, February 2010

In its 50-year history, Little Rock Air Force Base has been operated by six Air Force Major Commands (MAJCOMs): SAC, TAC, MAC, AMC, ACC, and AETC. These represent every possible MAJCOM a continental U.S.-based operational flying base could have been assigned to except for the former Air Defense Command/Aerospace Defense Command (ADC), Air Force Systems Command (AFSC), and the current Air Force Global Strike Command (AFGSC).

In 2012, First Lady Michelle Obama visited the Little Rock base to mark the second anniversary of the Let's Move initiative.

=== Major commands to which assigned ===
- Strategic Air Command, 1 February 1955
- Tactical Air Command, 1 April 1970
- Military Airlift Command, 1 December 1974
- Air Mobility Command, 1 June 1992 – 1 July 1993; 1 April 1997 – present

Attached to: Air Education and Training Command, 1 April 1997 – present

- Air Combat Command, 1 July 1993 – 1 April 1997

=== Major units assigned ===
- 70th Strategic Reconnaissance Wing, 24 January 1955 – 25 October 1961

Redesignated: 70th Bombardment Wing, 25 October 1961 – 25 June 1962

- 384th Bombardment Wing, 1 August 1955 – 1 September 1965
- 825th Air Division, 1 August 1955 – 1 June 1962

Redesignated: 825 Strategic Aerospace Division, 1 June 1962 – 1 April 1970

- 308th Strategic Missile Wing, 1 April 1962 – 18 August 1987
- 189th Airlift Wing (various designations), 1 October 1962 – present
- 43d Bombardment Wing, 1 September 1964 – 31 January 1970
- 64th Tactical Airlift Wing, 9 March 1970 – 30 May 1971
- 314th Tactical Airlift Wing, 1 April 1971 – 1974

Redesignated: 314th Military Airlift Wing, 1974 – 1991
Redesignated: 314th Airlift Wing, 1991 – present

- 834th Airlift Division, 1 January 1972 – 31 December 1974
- 34th Tactical Airlift Training Group, 15 September 1978 – 1 December 1991
- 463d Airlift Group, 1 April 1997 – 1 October 2008
- United States Air Force Mobility Weapons School, 3 February 2003 – present
- 19th Airlift Wing, 1 October 2008 – present
- 913th Airlift Group, 13 July 2014 – present

References for history introduction, major commands and major units

=== Aircraft assigned (Strategic Air Command) ===
- Boeing B-47 Stratojet (bomber)
- Convair B-58 Hustler (supersonic bomber)
- Boeing KC-97 Stratofreighter (aerial refueling aircraft)
- Boeing KC-135 Stratotanker (aerial refueling aircraft)

== Role and operations ==
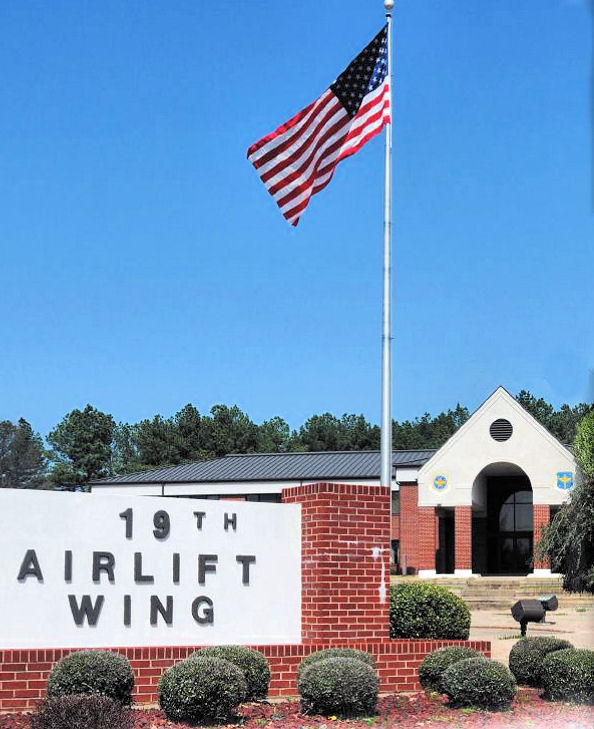
19th Airlift Wing headquarters building

Little Rock Air Force Base is the home of the 19th Airlift Wing, the host unit. There are also two major associate units located here, the 314th Airlift Wing reports to Air Education and Training Command, and the C-130 division of the U.S. Air Force Weapons School reports to Air Combat Command. Additionally, the 189th Airlift Wing of the Arkansas Air National Guard is located here. The 189th AW also reports to Air Education and Training Command.

=== 19th Airlift Wing ===
- 19th Operations Group

The 19th Operations Group is composed of two flying squadrons—the 41st and 61st Airlift Squadrons. The 41st is the Air Force's first active-duty combat-ready C-130J squadron. These squadrons are operational and deploy throughout the world.

- 19th Mission Support Group

The 19th Mission Support Group encompasses the support and logistic functions for the base. The group includes contracting, civil engineer, communications, security forces, force support and the logistic readiness squadrons.

- 19th Maintenance Group

Deploys and trains C-130 maintainers and aircraft.

- 19th Medical Group

The 19th Medical Group offers family practice, pediatrics and flight medicine clinics that will provide the bulk of care. The 19th Medical Group also has women's health, physical therapy, optometry, life skills, and dental clinics along with diagnostic services and prevention programs. For specialty medical services not available in the immediate medical facility, the 19th have partnered with doctors and hospitals in the area.

- 314th Airlift Wing

Directly reporting to Nineteenth Air Force at Randolph Air Force Base, Texas, the 314th Airlift Wing is composed of one C-130 flying squadron—the 62nd Airlift Squadron. It is the premier C-130 training base in the Department of Defense, training C-130 crew members from all branches of the service and the U.S. Coast Guard.

- 314th Operations Group
- 314th Maintenance Group

The 314th Maintenance Group provides direct support for the wing's primary mission forces, an AMC operational group and the Mobility Weapons School. The group’s mission includes direct sortie production, aircraft equipment support, aircraft preventive maintenance and inspections, component repair, maintenance training, and health of the fleet management. The group is composed of a command staff element and two reporting squadrons; 314th Maintenance Operations Squadron and 314th Aircraft Maintenance Squadron.

=== Air National Guard and Air Reserve operations ===
- 189th Airlift Wing (Arkansas ANG)

The Arkansas Air National Guard's 189th Airlift Wing is located on Little Rock Air Force Base and is aligned in the standard combat wing organization with the 189th AW headquarters staff, 189th Operations Group, 189th Maintenance Group, 189th Mission Support Group and the 189th Medical Group. The wing provides support to five geographically separated units: the Arkansas Air National Guard headquarters, the 123rd Intelligence Squadron and the 154th Weather Flight on Little Rock AFB, the 223rd Combat Communications Squadron in Hot Springs, Arkansas, and the National Guard Marksmanship Training Center at Camp Joseph T. Robinson in North Little Rock, Arkansas.

- 913th Airlift Group (Air Force Reserve Command)

The 913th Airlift Group is part of the 22nd Air Force, Air Force Reserve Command. The group began as the 22nd Air Force Detachment 1, activated October 2010. The detachment was re-designated the 913th Airlift Group on July 13, 2014. The group provides C-130J combat airlift capability on a world-wide scale, becoming a Reserve associate of the 19th Airlift Wing, Little Rock AFB, Ark., in December 2015. The mission of the 913th is to "Train, ready and support the world's best warrior airman to project dominant and globally responsive tactical airlift." In addition, the 913th Airlift Group has extensive global reach capabilities, capable of an array of operational missions.

- 96th APS (Air Force Reserve Command)

Little Rock Air Force Base is also home to the 96th Aerial Port Squadron also known as the "Combat Hogs", assigned to the 913th Airlift Group. Established in 1975, the 142 authorized personnel are one of the most recognized Aerial port squadrons in AFRC (Air Force Reserve Command). The 96th augments the 19th yearly to fill vacancies due to their AEF (Aerospace Expeditionary Force) commitments.

== Based units ==
Flying and notable non-flying units are based at Little Rock Air Force Base.

Units marked GSU are Geographically Separate Units, which, although based at Little Rock, are subordinate to a parent unit based at another location.

=== United States Air Force ===
Air Mobility Command (AMC)

- Eighteenth Air Force
  - 19th Airlift Wing (host wing)
    - 19th Operations Group
      - 19th Operations Support Squadron
      - 34th Combat Training Squadron
      - 41st Airlift Squadron – C-130J Super Hercules
      - 61st Airlift Squadron – C-130J Super Hercules
    - 19th Maintenance Group
    - 19th Medical Group
      - 19th Aeromedical Dental Squadron
      - 19th Aerospace Medicine Squadron
      - 19th Healthcare Operations Squadron
    - 19th Mission Support Group

Air Force Reserve Command (AFRC)

- Twenty-Second Air Force
  - 913th Airlift Group
    - 96th Aerial Port Squadron
    - 327th Airlift Squadron – C-130J Super Hercules
    - 913th Aerospace Medical Squadron
    - 913th Force Support Squadron
    - 913th Maintenance Squadron
    - 913th Operations Support Squadron

Air National Guard (ANG)

- Arkansas Air National Guard
  - 189th Airlift Wing
    - 189th Operations Group
      - 154th Training Squadron – C-130H Hercules
    - 189th Maintenance Group
    - 189th Medical Group
    - 189th Mission Support Group

Air Education and Training Command (AETC)

- Second Air Force
  - 82nd Training Wing
    - 982nd Training Group
      - 373rd Training Squadron
        - Detachment 4 (GSU)
- Nineteenth Air Force
  - 314th Airlift Wing
    - 314th Operations Group
      - 62nd Airlift Squadron – C-130J Super Hercules
      - 714th Training Squadron
    - 314th Maintenance Group
      - 314th Maintenance Squadron
      - 314th Aircraft Maintenance Squadron
      - 314th Maintenance Operations Squadron
    - 314th Mission Support Group
      - 314th Civil Engineer Squadron
      - 314th Communications Squadron
      - 314th Contracting Squadron
      - 314th Logistics Readiness Squadron
      - 314th Mission Support Squadron
      - 314th Security Forces Squadron
      - 314th Services Squadron
    - 314th Medical Group
      - 314th Medical Operations Squadron
      - 314th Medical Support Squadron

Air Combat Command (ACC)

- US Air Force Warfare Center
  - 57th Wing
    - USAF Weapons School
      - 29th Weapons Squadron (GSU) – C-130H Hercules and C-130J Super Hercules
- United States Marine Corps
  - CNATT Detachment Little Rock

== Education ==
Areas on post are within the Jacksonville North Pulaski School District (JNPSD). Zoned schools for dependent children on post are Bobby G. Lester Elementary School, Jacksonville Middle School, and Jacksonville High School.

JPNSD was created in 2016. Prior to that year, areas on post were in the Pulaski County Special School District. Lester elementary opened in 2018.

Jacksonville Lighthouse Charter School District's Flightline Upper Academy, a charter middle school, is on post.

== See also ==
- List of United States Air Force installations

== Sources ==
- Maurer, Maurer. Air Force Combat Units of World War II. Washington, DC: U.S. Government Printing Office 1961 (republished 1983, Office of Air Force History, ISBN 0-912799-02-1).
- Ravenstein, Charles A. Air Force Combat Wings Lineage and Honors Histories 1947–1977. Maxwell Air Force Base, Alabama: Office of Air Force History 1984. ISBN 0-912799-12-9.
- Mueller, Robert, Air Force Bases Volume I, Active Air Force Bases Within the United States of America on 17 September 1982, Office of Air Force History, 1989
- Brief History of Little Rock Air Force Base (source of history)
