= USS Iron County =

1944 LST-542-class tank landing ship

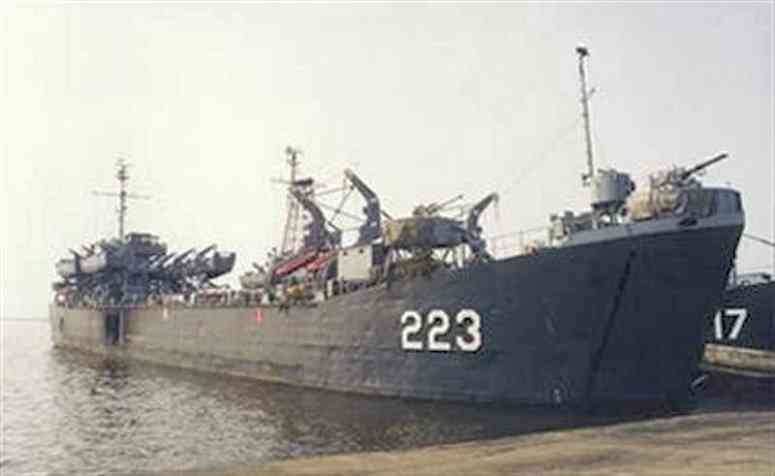
- ROCS Chung Fu at the Tzoying Naval Base in 1997

History

United States
- Name: LST-840
- Builder: American Bridge Company
- Laid down: 28 September 1944
- Launched: 15 November 1944
- Sponsored by: Mrs. C. W. Doerr
- Commissioned: 11 December 1944
- Decommissioned: 1 June 1946
- Namesake: Iron County
- Recommissioned: 3 November 1950
- Decommissioned: 1 July 1958
- Renamed: Iron County
- Stricken: 1 July 1958
- Identification: Callsign: NHWD; Hull number: LST-840
- Honors and awards: See Awards
- Fate: Transferred to the Republic of China, 1 July 1958

History

Taiwan
- Name: Chung Fu; (中富)
- Acquired: 1 July 1958
- Commissioned: 1 July 1958
- Decommissioned: 16 October 1997
- Stricken: 8 November 1997
- Identification: Hull number: LST-223

General characteristics
- Class & type: LST-542-class tank landing ship
- Displacement: 1,625 long tons (1,651 t) light; 4,080 long tons (4,145 t) full
- Length: 328 ft (100 m)
- Beam: 50 ft (15 m)
- Draft: Unloaded : 2 ft 4 in (0.71 m) forward; 7 ft 6 in (2.29 m) aft; Loaded : 8 ft 2 in (2.49 m) forward; 14 ft 1 in (4.29 m) aft
- Propulsion: 2 × General Motors 12-567 diesel engines, two shafts, twin rudders
- Speed: 12 knots (22 km/h; 14 mph)
- Boats & landing craft carried: 2 × LCVPs
- Troops: 16 officers, 147 enlisted men
- Complement: 7 officers, 104 enlisted men
- Armament: 8 × 40 mm guns; 12 × 20 mm guns

USS Iron County (LST-840) was an LST-542-class tank landing ship built for the United States Navy during World War II. Named after counties in Michigan, Missouri, Utah, and Wisconsin, she was the only U.S. Naval vessel to bear the name.

== Construction and career ==
Originally laid down as LST-840 by the American Bridge Company of Ambridge, Pennsylvania on 28 September 1944; launched on 15 November, sponsored by Mrs. C. W. Doerr; and commissioned on 11 December.

=== Service in the United States Navy ===
==== World War II ====
Following shakedown off Florida, LST-840 loaded cargo at Gulfport, Mississippi, then sailed on 14 January 1945 for the Pacific. Additional cargo stops were made at San Francisco and Seattle before departing for the Marshall Islands; she arrived at Eniwetok on 24 March. After preparations in the Marshall and Caroline Islands, the landing ship departed Ulithi on 12 April for Okinawa. The battle for this strategic island, which lay at the gateway to the Japanese homeland, was well underway when LST-840 arrived on the 18th. She unloaded combat engineers and equipment, then returned Ulithi on 5 May. 5 August the ship dropped off 500 tons of bombs at Iwo Jima and secured 25 Japanese pow's from the U.S. Marines and delivered them to Guam. For the remainder of World War II, she shuttled troops and cargo throughout the American staging areas in the Pacific. After V-J Day, LST-840 operated with U.S. occupation forces in Japan and Okinawa for the next three months. Embarking 500 marines at Guam, she departed on 11 November en route to Pearl Harbor and the United States. Arriving at San Diego on 15 December, she remained on the West Coast until she decommissioned at Vancouver, Washington on 1 June 1946, joining the Columbia River Group, Pacific Reserve Fleet.

==== Korean War ====
In the effort to stop Communist aggression in South Korea, veteran ships were called out of reserve to provide support for the U.N. forces in Asia. LST-840 recommissioned on 3 November 1950. Following training off the West Coast and Hawaii, she loaded trucks and equipment, then departed Honolulu on 1 May 1951 for the Pacific staging areas. From June to November, the loading ship operated between Korea and Japan, shuttling cargo and prisoners of war along the war-torn peninsula. She returned to the United States on 27 November and, following overhaul, she departed Oakland, California on 16 May 1952 for duty in Alaska. LST-840 performed cargo operations there for six months before returning to San Diego. On 13 March 1953 she sailed on her second Korean tour, arriving at Yokosuka on 1 May. For the duration of the conflict, she remained in the Inchon vicinity and after the July truce continued peacekeeping operations in the Far East until late November.

After a stay in the United States, LST-840 was back in the Far East, arriving at Henrietta Pass, French Indochina on 28 October 1954. In the aftermath of the Indochina War, she loaded French troops and equipment and shuttled them along the coast of southeast Asia. Arriving Subic Bay on 22 November, she operated in the Far East until April, 1955 then steamed for San Diego.

LST-840 was named USS Iron County (LST-840) on 1 July 1955, and on 10 January 1956 she was en route to Pearl Harbor, her new home port. From January 1956 to November 1957 she performed amphibious exercises out of Hawaii, returning to the West Coast on 23 November.

==== Decommissioning ====
Iron County remained at San Francisco until 1 July 1958, when she decommissioned, struck from the Naval Vessel Register, and transferred to the Republic of China under the Military Assistance Program.

=== Service in the Republic of China Navy ===
She served the Chinese Nationalist Navy as ROCS Chung Fu (LST-223). Struck from the Republic of China Navy on 8 November 1997, her final fate is unknown.

== Awards ==
LST-840 earned three battle stars for Korean War service.
