= Ohio State Route 223 =

State Route 223

Route information
- Maintained by ODOT

Location
- Country: United States
- State: Ohio

Highway system
- Ohio State Highway System; Interstate; US; State; Scenic
← US 223	→ US 224

In Ohio, State Route 223 may refer to:

- U.S. Route 223 in Ohio, the only Ohio highway numbered 223 since about 1930
- Ohio State Route 223 (1923-1927), now US 27 (Ross to McGonigle)
- Ohio State Route 223 (1927-1930), Perrysburg Holland Road northwest of Holland Sylvania Road
