= USS Triana (IX-223) =

History

United States
- Name: Elinor Wylie
- Namesake: Elinor Wylie
- Owner: War Shipping Administration (WSA)
- Operator: McCormick Steamship Lines
- Ordered: as a Type EC2-S-C1 hull, MCE hull 2559
- Builder: California Shipbuilding Corporation, Terminal Island, Los Angeles, California
- Yard number: 290
- Way number: 6
- Laid down: 27 December 1943
- Launched: 24 January 1944
- In service: 10 February 1944
- Fate: transferred to the US Navy, 24 May 1945

United States
- Name: Triana
- Namesake: Rodrigo de Triana
- Acquired: 24 May 1945
- Commissioned: 24 May 1945
- Decommissioned: 20 February 1946
- Renamed: Triana, on 21 May 1945
- Stricken: 12 March 1946
- Identification: Hull symbol: IX-223
- Fate: Returned to MARCOM 20 February 1946, sold for scrapping 12 September 1958

General characteristics
- Class & type: Triana-class miscellaneous unclassified
- Type: Type EC2-S-C1
- Displacement: 14,230 long tons (14,460 t)
- Length: 441 ft 6 in (134.57 m)
- Beam: 56 ft 11 in (17.35 m)
- Draught: 27 ft 9 in (8.46 m)
- Installed power: 2 × Babcock & Wilcox header-type boilers, 250psi 450°; 2,500 shp (1,900 kW)
- Propulsion: 1 × vertical triple-expansion reciprocating steam engine; 1 × propeller
- Speed: 12 kn (14 mph; 22 km/h)
- Complement: 98 officers and men
- Armament: 2 × 3 in (76 mm)/50 caliber dual purpose (DP) guns

USS Triana (IX-223), an unclassified miscellaneous vessel, was the second ship of the United States Navy to be named for Rodrigo de Triana, the discoverer of the Americas.

== Construction ==
Triana was laid down on 27 December 1943, under a Maritime Commission contract, MC hull No. 2559, as the Liberty ship SS Elinor Wylie, by California Shipbuilding Corporation, Terminal Island, Los Angeles, California, for the McCormick Steamship Lines; launched on 24 January 1944; sponsored by Mrs. William O'Brien; renamed Triana on 21 May 1945; acquired by the Navy from the War Shipping Administration (WSA) on a "bare-boat" basis on 24 May 194; and commissioned at Pearl Harbor the same day.

== Service history ==
The ship had been severely damaged by an underwater explosion in 1944, and was not considered seaworthy when fully loaded. Nevertheless, during the period 24 May to 29 July, she was patched up, strengthened, and converted into a floating storage ship by the Pearl Harbor Navy Yard.

On 30 July, Triana got underway for the Marshall Islands and arrived at Eniwetok on 11 August. One of her holds was consigned to fleet freight, and the remaining cargo space was utilized for drum storage. On 24 September, after the vessel had taken on some 4,500 long tons (4,600 t) of cargo, her Number 2 hold began leaking, and further loading operations were cancelled. The leaks were temporarily stopped, and the ship continued to receive and discharge fleet freight and drum lubricating oil until 30 November.

On 1 December, Triana got underway for Guam to unload 8,896 drums of lubricating oil. She arrived at Apra Harbor on 5 December, and departed for the United States on 24 December 1945. The cargo ship arrived at San Francisco, California, on 15 January 1946, to prepare for inactivation. Triana was decommissioned and returned to the War Shipping Administration on 21 February 1946 and struck from the Naval Vessel Register on 12 March 1946.

== Fate ==
She was placed in the National Defense Reserve Fleet, Suisun Bay Group. In a 17 October 1951, Fleet Report it was recommended that she be scrapped because of the torpedo damage she had incurred during the war, it was estimated that it would cost less than $100,000 to repair her. She was purchased by the Lerner Company, on 12 September 1958, for $73,640. She was physically removed from the Reserve Fleet on 1 October 1958.

== Notes ==
Citations

== Bibliography ==
Online resources

- "Triana II (IX-223)". Dictionary of American Naval Fighting Ships. Naval History and Heritage Command. 30 September 2015. This article incorporates text from this source, which is in the public domain.
- "California Shipbuilding, Los Angeles CA". www.ShipbuildingHistory.com. 13 October 2010.
- "USS Triana (IX-223)". NavSource. 2 August 2013.
- "ELINOR WYLIE". United States Department of Transportation. Archived from the original on December 12, 2019.
