= USS LST-223 =

LST-1-class landing ship tank

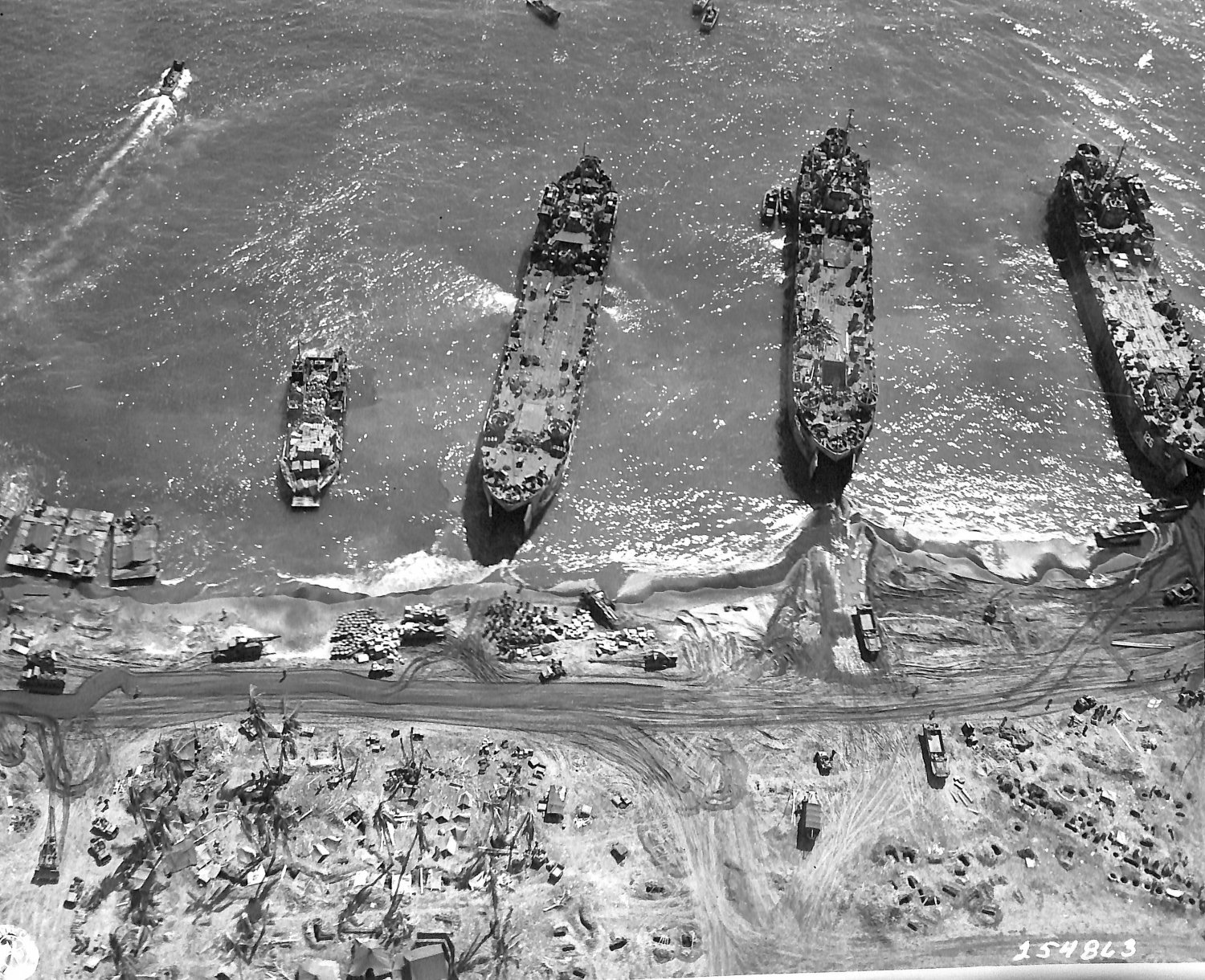
- USS LST-223 (middle) at Leyte, October 1944

History

United States
- Name: LST-223
- Builder: Chicago Bridge & Iron Co., Seneca
- Laid down: 31 March 1943
- Launched: 24 August 1943
- Sponsored by: Mrs. George S. Trees
- Commissioned: 17 September 1943
- Decommissioned: 1 May 1946
- Reclassified: LST(H)-223, 15 September 1945
- Identification: Callsign: NQCL
- Honors and awards: See Awards
- Fate: Transferred to France, March 1947

History

France
- Name: Rance
- Namesake: Rance
- Commissioned: March 1947
- Decommissioned: 8 March 1961
- Identification: Pennant number: L9004
- Fate: Scrapped

General characteristics
- Class & type: LST-1-class tank landing ship
- Displacement: 4,080 long tons (4,145 t) full load; 2,160 long tons (2,190 t) landing
- Length: 328 ft (100 m) oa
- Beam: 50 ft (15 m)
- Draft: Full load: 8 ft 2 in (2.49 m) forward; 14 ft 1 in (4.29 m) aft; Landing at 2,160 t: 3 ft 11 in (1.19 m) forward; 9 ft 10 in (3.00 m) aft
- Installed power: 2 × 900 hp (670 kW) Electro-Motive Diesel 12-567A diesel engines; 1,700 shp (1,300 kW)
- Propulsion: 1 × Falk main reduction gears; 2 × Propellers
- Speed: 12 kn (22 km/h; 14 mph)
- Range: 24,000 nmi (44,000 km; 28,000 mi) at 9 kn (17 km/h; 10 mph) while displacing 3,960 long tons (4,024 t)
- Boats & landing craft carried: 2 or 6 x LCVPs
- Capacity: 2,100 tons oceangoing maximum; 350 tons main deckload
- Troops: 16 officers, 147 enlisted men
- Complement: 13 officers, 104 enlisted men
- Armament: Varied, ultimate armament; 2 × twin 40 mm (1.57 in) Bofors guns; 4 × single 40 mm Bofors guns; 12 × 20 mm (0.79 in) Oerlikon cannons

USS LST-223 was a LST-1-class tank landing ship in the United States Navy during World War II. She was later sold to France as Rance (L9004).

== Construction and career ==
LST-223 was laid down on 31 March 1943 at Chicago Bridge & Iron Co., Seneca, Illinois. Launched on 24 August 1943 and commissioned on 17 September 1943.

=== Service in the United States ===
During World War II, LST-223 was assigned to the Asiatic-Pacific theater. She took part in the Battle of Kwajalein and Majuro Atolls from 31 January to 8 February 1944 and the Leyte landings from 20 October and 19 to 29 November 1944. She also participated in the invasion of Saipan from 15 to 24 June 1944.

On 15 September 1945, she was redesignated as LST(H)-223.

LST-223 was decommissioned on 1 May 1946 and later struck from the Navy Register.

=== Service in France ===
She was transferred to the French Navy and commissioned in March 1947 with the name Rance (L9004).

The ship was beached at the Suez Canal during the Suez Crisis on 8 November 1956.

Rance took part in the Algerian War between 1 November 1954 to 19 March 1962 and the First Indochina War between 19 December 1946 to 1 August 1954.

The ship was out of service on 8 March 1961 and later sold for scrap.

== Awards ==
LST-223 have earned the following awards:

- American Campaign Medal
- Asiatic-Pacific Campaign Medal (3 battle stars)
- World War II Victory Medal
- Navy Occupation Service Medal (with Asia clasp)
- Philippines Presidential Unit Citation
- Philippines Liberation Medal (1 award)

== Sources ==
- United States. Dept. of the Treasury (1962). Treasury Decisions Under the Customs, Internal Revenue, Industrial Alcohol, Narcotic and Other Laws, Volume 97. U.S. Government Printing Office.
- Moore, Capt. John (1984). Jane's Fighting Ships 1984-85. Jane's Information Group. ISBN 978-0710607959.
- Saunders, Stephen (2009). Jane's Fighting Ships 2009-2010. Jane's Information Group. ISBN 978-0710628886.
- Fairplay International Shipping Journal Volume 222. United Kingdom: Fairplay Publishing Limited. 1967.
