= USS Dour =

Minesweeper of the United States Navy

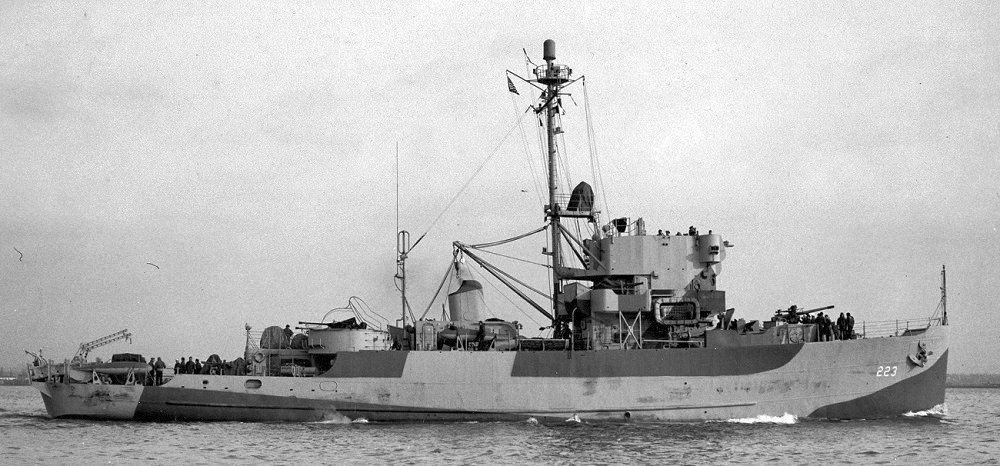
- USS Dour (AM 223) 18 December 1944

History

United States
- Name: USS Dour (AM-223)
- Builder: American Ship Building Company, Lorain, Ohio
- Laid down: 24 October 1942
- Launched: 25 March 1944
- Sponsored by: Mrs. W. R. Douglas
- Commissioned: 4 November 1944
- Decommissioned: 15 March 1947
- Reclassified: MSF-223, 7 February 1955
- Stricken: 1 May 1962
- Fate: transferred to Mexican Navy, 1 October 1962

History

Mexico
- Name: ARM DM-16
- Acquired: 1 October 1962
- Stricken: 1986
- Fate: unknown

General characteristics
- Class & type: Admirable-class minesweeper
- Displacement: 650 long tons (660 t)
- Length: 184 ft 6 in (56.24 m)
- Beam: 33 ft (10 m)
- Draft: 9 ft 9 in (2.97 m)
- Propulsion: 2 × ALCO 539 diesel engines, 1,710 shp (1,280 kW); Farrel-Birmingham single reduction gear; 2 shafts
- Speed: 15 knots (28 km/h)
- Complement: 104
- Armament: 1 × 3"/50 caliber (76 mm) DP gun; 2 × twin Bofors 40 mm guns; 1 × Hedgehog anti-submarine mortar; 2 × Depth charge tracks

Service record
- Part of: U.S. Pacific Fleet (1944–1947); Atlantic Reserve Fleet (1947–1962); Mexican Navy (1963–1986)
- Awards: 3 Battle stars

USS Dour (AM-223) was an Admirable-class minesweeper built for the United States Navy during World War II. She was awarded three battle stars for service in the Pacific during World War II. She was decommissioned in March 1947 and placed in reserve. While she remained in reserve, Dour was reclassified as MSF-223 in February 1955 but never reactivated. In October 1962, she was sold to the Mexican Navy and renamed ARM DM-16. She was stricken from Mexican Navy service in 1986, but her ultimate fate is not reported in secondary sources.

== U.S. Navy career ==
Dour was launched 25 March 1944 by American Shipbuilding Co., Lorain, Ohio; sponsored by Mrs. W. R. Douglas; and commissioned 4 November 1944. Dour arrived at Boston, Massachusetts, 26 November from the Great Lakes and the St. Lawrence River. She served in the Local Defense Force, until 1 February 1945 when she got underway for Norfolk, Virginia.

Dour sailed from Norfolk 9 March 1945 for the Pacific. She called at San Diego, California, Pearl Harbor, and Saipan and arrived at Okinawa 26 May escorting a convoy of landing craft. After patrolling off Okinawa and Ie Shima, on 23 July she joined in minesweeping coordinated with the U.S. 3rd Fleet strikes on Japan.

Engaged in postwar sweeping operations Dour swept for mines in the Yellow Sea and off Jinsen, Korea. On 9 September she arrived at Sasebo, Japan, and swept Japanese waters until 28 December when she sailed for the west coast, arriving at San Pedro, California, 7 February 1946. Dour received three battle stars for World War II service.

On 8 April she got underway for Algiers, Louisiana, where she remained from 26 April to 2 May. She served ships in reserve at Orange, Texas, until placed out of commission in reserve there 15 March 1947. While she remained in reserve, Dour was reclassified MSF-223 on 7 February 1955. She was struck from the Naval Register on 1 May 1962 and transferred to Mexico on 1 October 1962.

== Mexican Navy career ==
The former Dour was acquired by the Mexican Navy in October 1962 and renamed ARM DM-16. She was stricken from Mexican Navy service in 1986, but her ultimate fate is not reported in secondary sources.
