= 223rd =

223rd may refer to:

== United Kingdom ==
- 223rd Brigade (United Kingdom), a Home Defence formation of the British Army during the First World War
- 223rd Independent Infantry Brigade (Home), a Home Defence formation of the British Army during the Second World War
- 223rd Brigade Royal Field Artillery
- 223rd (Banffshire) Medium Battery, Royal Artillery
- 223rd (Devon) Field Battery, Royal Artillery
- 223rd (2nd London) Field Park Company, Royal Engineers

== United States ==
- 223rd Military Intelligence Battalion (United States), California Army National Guard; provides interpreters, translators, counter-intelligence, interrogation and signals intelligence support
- 223rd Cyberspace Operations Squadron, U.S. Air Force
- 223rd Engineer Battalion (United States), U.S. Army
- 223rd Aviation Regiment (United States), U.S. Army
- 223rd Infantry Regiment (United States), U.S. Army

== Other ==
- 223rd Battalion (Canadian Scandinavians), CEF, Canadian Army; a unit in the Canadian Expeditionary Force during the First World War
- 223rd Mixed Brigade (Spain), a unit of the Spanish Republican Army in the Spanish Civil War
- 223rd Coastal Division (Italy), World War II Royal Italian Army
- 223rd Infantry Division (Wehrmacht), World War II German Wehrmacht
- 223rd Rifle Division, World War II Soviet Red Army
- 223rd Flight Unit, Russian Air Force
- 223rd Anti-aircraft Missile Regiment (Ukraine), Ukrainian Air Force

== See also ==
- 223 (disambiguation), including units "No, 223"
