= 184th Attack Squadron =

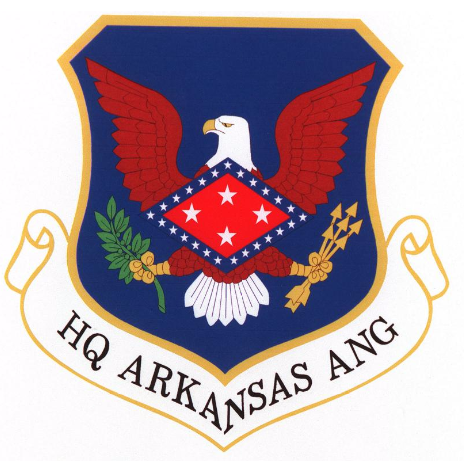
184th Attack Squadron

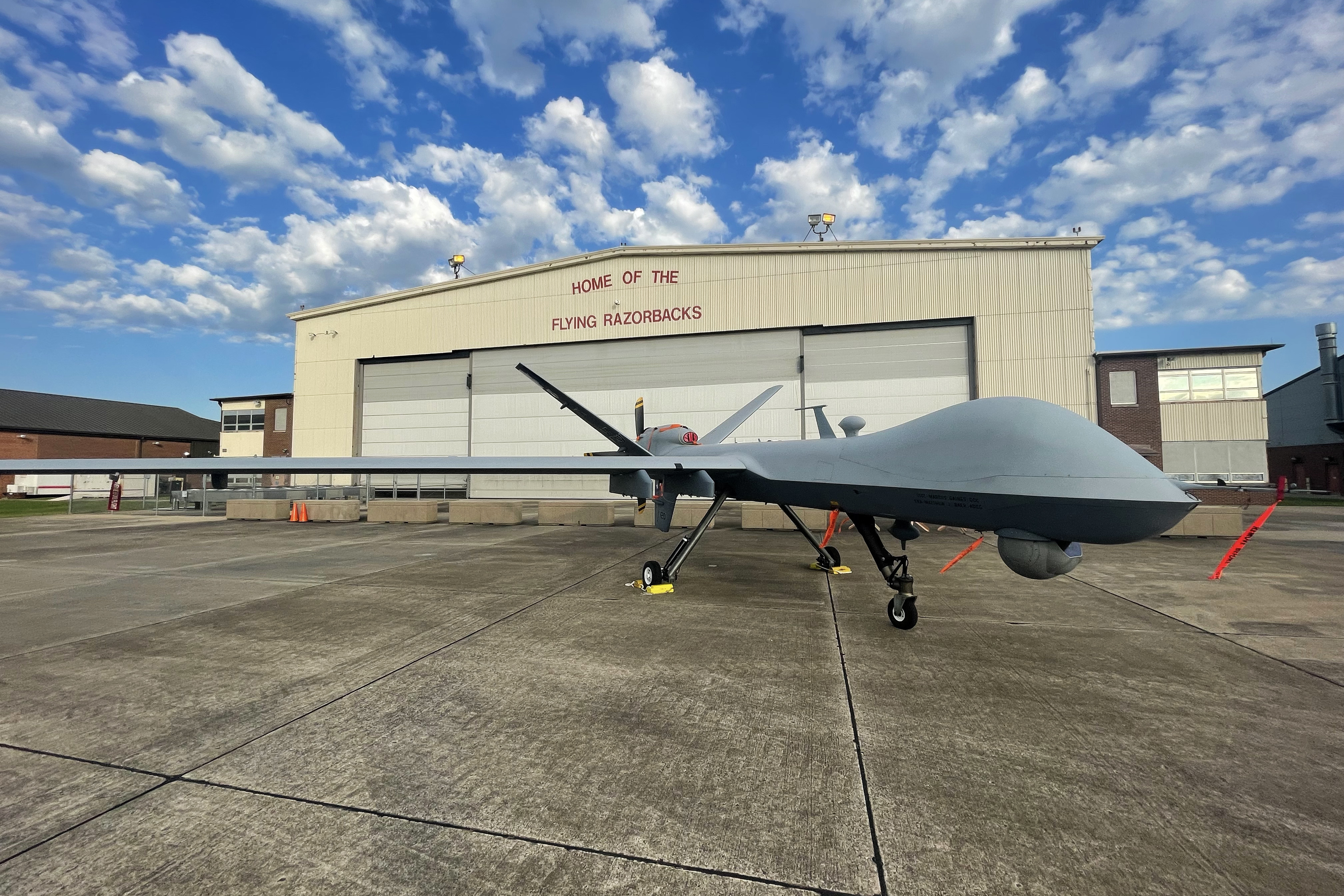
- MQ-9 Reaper at Ebbing Air National Guard Base
- Active: 1953–present
- Country: United States
- Allegiance: Arkansas
- Branch: Air National Guard
- Type: Squadron
- Role: Attack
- Part of: Arkansas Air National Guard
- Garrison/HQ: Ebbing Air National Guard Base, Arkansas
- Nickname: "Flying Razorbacks"

Insignia
- 184th Fighter Squadron emblem
- Tail code: FS
- Tail stripe

The 184th Attack Squadron is a unit of the Arkansas Air National Guard 188th Wing located at Ebbing Air National Guard Base, Arkansas. The 184th is equipped with the MQ-9 Reaper. In June 2014 the squadron transitioned from A-10C to the MQ-9.

== Mission ==
The 184th Attack Squadron MQ-9 Reaper Remotely Piloted Aircraft mission is to provide close air support, air interdiction, intelligence, surveillance and reconnaissance, and attack to eliminate threats when present. The multi-role capabilities of these RPAs allows Combat Search and Rescue operations and extended time over targets to locate, track, target, strike, and assess time sensitive targets.

== History ==
=== Tactical Reconnaissance ===
Constituted by the Air Force in 1953 at the 184th Tactical Reconnaissance Squadron. Organized at Fort Smith Regional Airport, Arkansas and extended recognition as a new unit on 15 October 1953. The squadron was assigned to the Tennessee ANG 118th Tactical Reconnaissance Group, Berry Field, Nashville, for administration, operational control was exercised by the Arkansas Air National Guard.

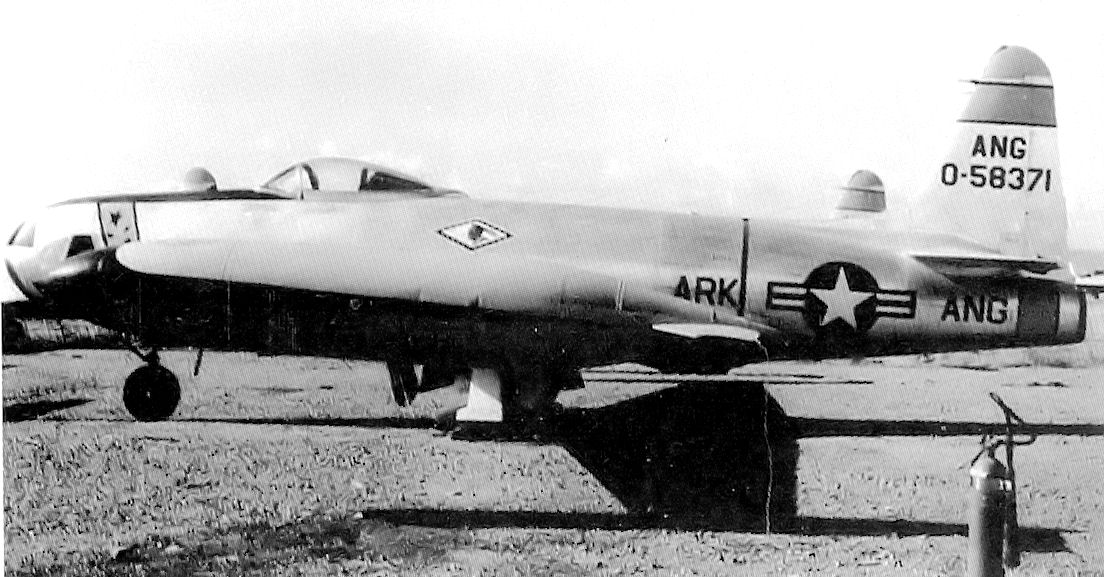
184th TRS RF-80A Shooting Star in 1955

The 184th was initially equipped with World War II-era RB-26C Invader night photo-reconnaissance aircraft. The black-painted RB-26s were originally medium bombers that were modified for aerial reconnaissance in the late 1940s. Most of the aircraft received were Korean War veterans, were unarmed and carried cameras and flash flares for night aerial photography. In 1956, the B-26 was reaching the end of its operational USAF service, and the squadron was re-equipped with RF-80A Shooting Star daylight reconnaissance aircraft that were also nearly obsolescent.

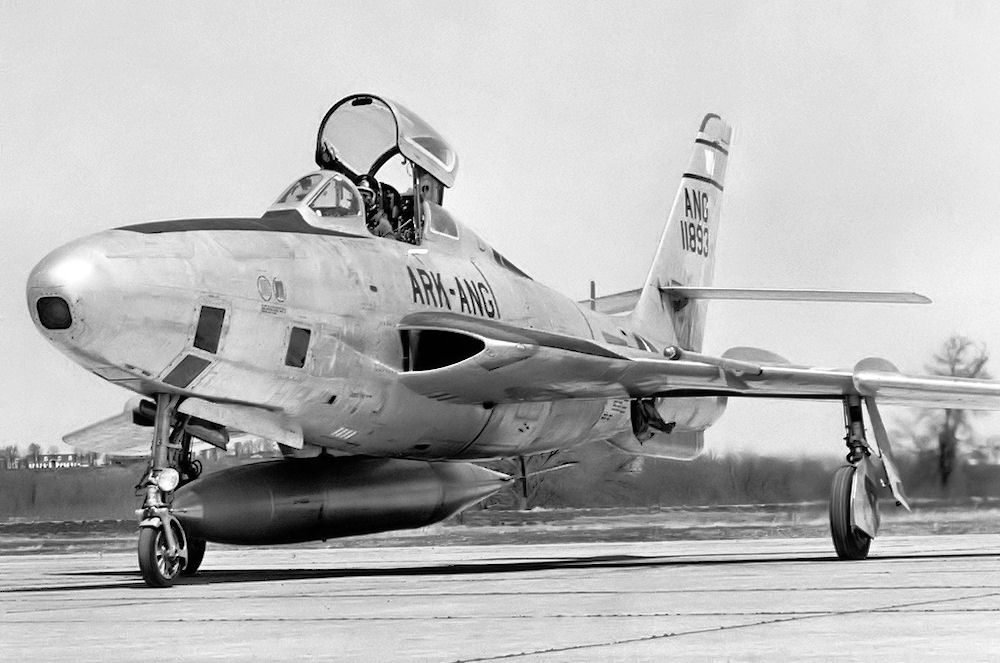
184th TRS RF-84F Thunderflash in 1958

In January 1957, the 184th retired its worn-out RF-80s and received new Republic RF-84F Thunderflash reconnaissance aircraft, manufactured for Air National Guard use. During the 1961 Berlin Crisis, the squadron was federalized and assigned to the mobilized Kentucky ANG 123d Tactical Reconnaissance Group however it remained at Fort Smith and was released from active duty and returned to Arkansas state control on 22 August 1962.

On 22 August 1962, the 184th was authorized to expand to a group level, and the 188th Tactical Reconnaissance Group was established by the National Guard Bureau. The 184th TRS becoming the group's flying squadron. Other elements assigned into the group were the 188th headquarters, 188th Material Squadron (maintenance and supply), 188th Combat Support Squadron, and the 188th Tactical Dispensary.

In 1970 with the winding-down of the Vietnam War, the 184th began receiving McDonnell RF-101C Voodoos, replacing the RF-84Fs the unit had been flying for over a decade. The USAF had, however, planned for the RF-101C to be gradually phased out of USAF service in favor of the McDonnell RF-4C Phantom II and the aircraft remained with the 184th for only a brief period of time, and in 1970 was retired.

=== Tactical Fighter ===
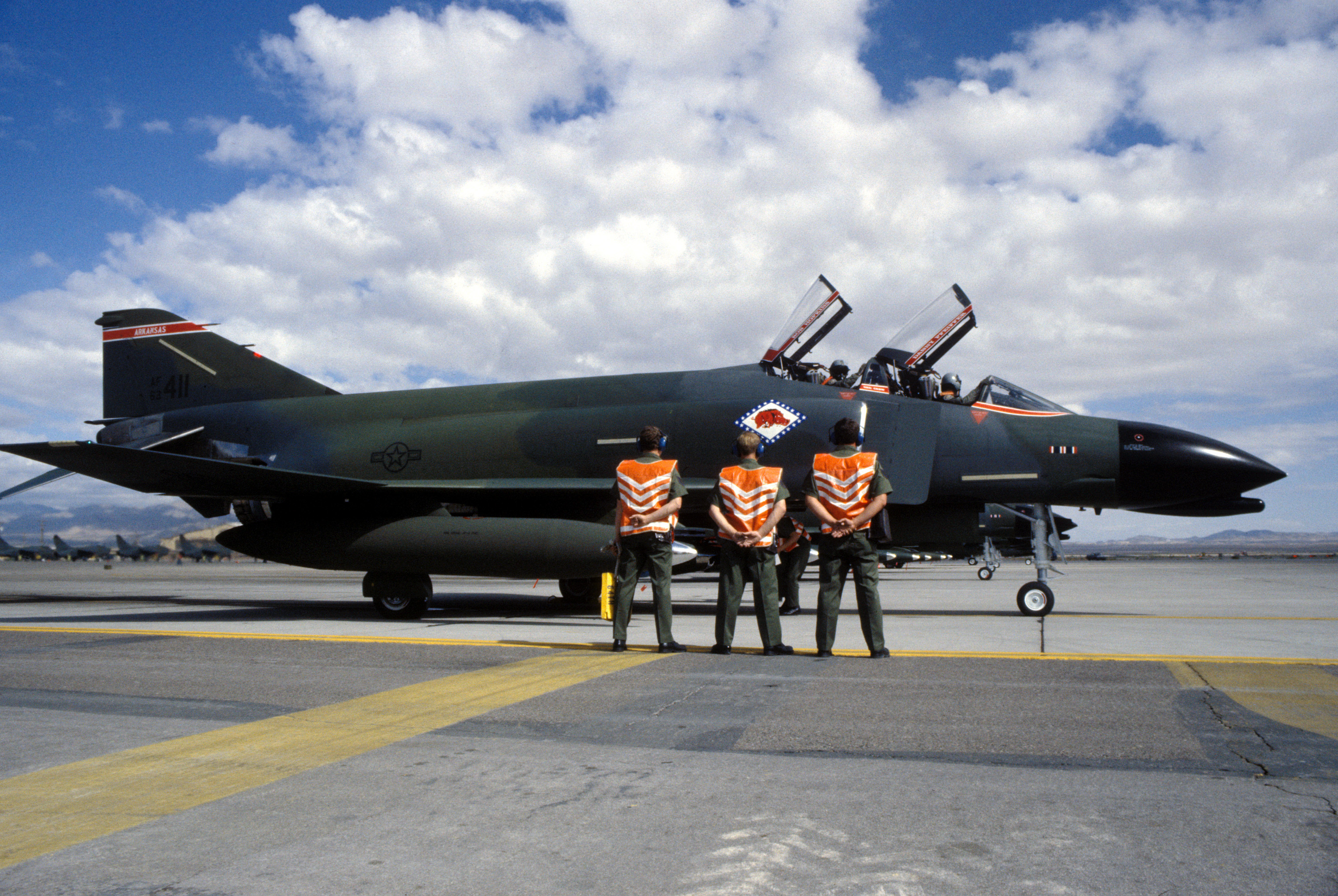
188th Tactical Fighter Group F-4C Phantom II at Nellis Air Force Base during Gunsmoke 85 (Note: Aircraft is McDonnell F-4C-15-MC Phantom II fighter, serial 63-7411.)

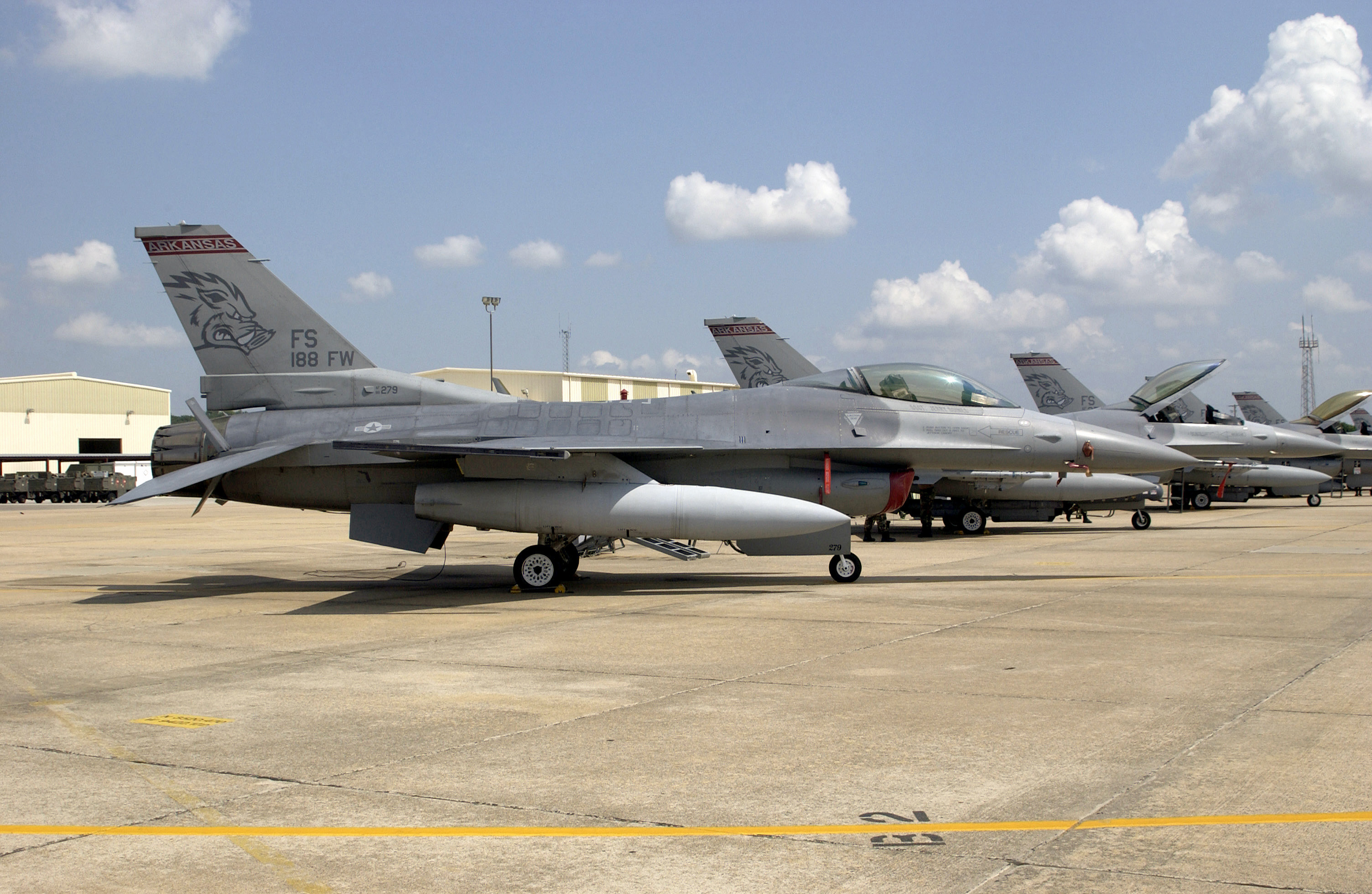
184th Fighter Squadron F-16Cs at Ft Smith, 2002

Following their withdrawal from the Vietnam War, numerous USAF F-100D Super Sabres were turned over to the Air National Guard. Tactical Air Command realigned the 184th into a tactical fighter group in 1972, and equipping the unit with Vietnam Veteran F-100D and twin-seat F-100F Trainers. In 1979, the Super Sabre was being retired and the 184th began receiving F-4C Phantom IIs to be used in an air defense role. In 1988, as part of the retirement of the Phantom II, the squadron began receiving Block 15 F-16A Fighting Falcons. The first F-16 delivery to the squadron was on 1 July 1988 and the formal acceptance of the F-16 happened on 15 October. On 15 March 1992, the 184th dropped the tactical name from the squadron as the parent 184th converted to the USAF Objective Wing organization.

In early 2001 the 184th began to retire its F-16A/B block 15s to AMARC in exchange for F-16C block 32s. They never received any D-models. Because the squadron flew the rarely seen block 32, the squadron became a source for spare F-16s for the USAF Thunderbirds flight demonstration team. In the end, the 184thnever had to give up any of their aircraft as the Thunderbirds took needed aircraft from home based Nellis 57th Fighter Wing.

Deployed to Prince Sultan Air Base, Saudi Arabia (24 October 2002 to December 2002) in support of Operation Southern Watch. In 2005, the 188th deployed nearly 300 Airmen and multiple F-16C Fighting Falcons to Balad Air Base, Iraq, in support of Operation Iraqi Freedom.

=== BRAC 2005 ===
BRAC 2005 initially decided to inactivate the 188th Fighter Wing and close Fort Smith ANGB. With a great deal of effort by Arkansas' leaders caused the BRAC panel to change its decision on the 184th FS and give it a new mission. The squadron would still lose its F-16s but in their place would get a total of eighteen A-10 Thunderbolt II ground attack aircraft. One of the deciding factors was Fort Smith's location near Fort Chaffee, a former National Guard training post.

On 18 October 2006 the 184th began giving up F-16s when two departed for the 194th Fighter Squadron located at Fresno Air National Guard Base, California. By April 2007 the 184th FS had already begun to receive the A-10 from the Massachusetts ANG 104th Fighter Wing and pilots had already commenced cross training in October. On 14 April 2007 the 184th FS marked the day with a celebration 'Viper Out/Warthog In' day. The 184th FS took the opportunity to display their new A-10 paint scheme and to still fly the F-16 but the 184th at this point was officially an A-10 unit.

=== Current status ===
In early 2012 the Air Force planned to realign the 184th Fighter Squadron and replace its 20 A-10 aircraft, converting the 184th to operate the General Atomics MQ-1 Predator unmanned aerial vehicle. However, after extensive discussions in August 2012 it was announced that the 188th Fighter Wing would retain its A-10s.

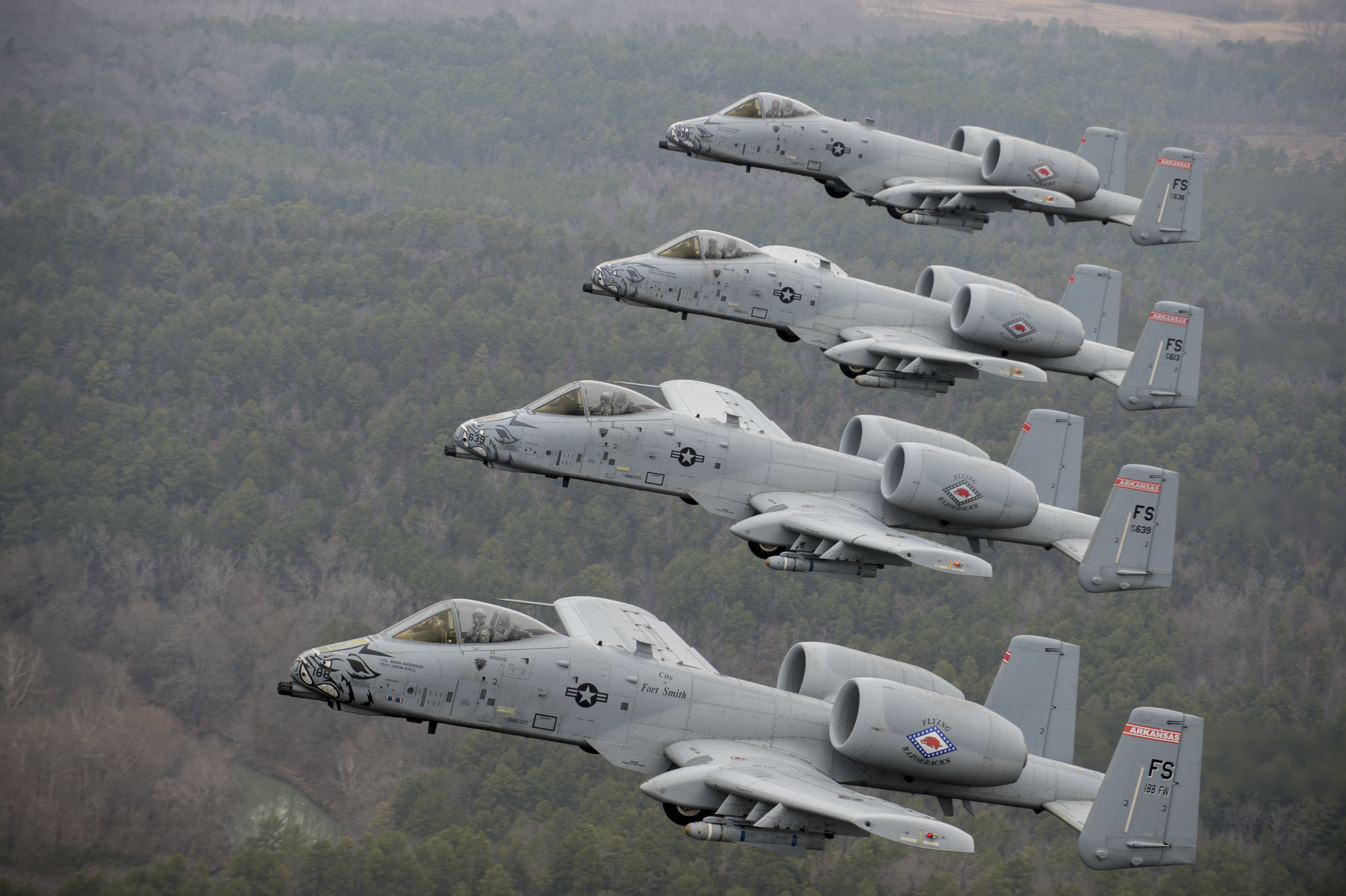
184th Fighter Squadron A-10 Thunderbolt IIs

In July 2012, the 188th Wing deployed 275 airmen and aircraft to Afghanistan in support of Operation Enduring Freedom. They were assigned to the 455th Air Expeditionary Wing, Bagram Airfield, near Kabul. This was the second AEF deployment for the 188th as a unit since receiving A-10 Thunderbolt II "Warthogs" 14 April 2007. The 188th's last AEF deployment transpired in 2010 when the unit deployed about 300 Airmen and 12 A-10Cs to the 451st Air Expeditionary Wing at Kandahar Airfield.

The guardsmen remained in Afghanistan until October, flying close air support in response to ground troops who may be in contact with the enemy, or to escort convoys in particularly hostile areas. When not supporting ground troops, A-10s patrol designated sectors and provided aerial reconnaissance on locations of interest to ground commanders. In three months, Arkansas ANG A-10s delivered more than 60,000 30mm cannon rounds and more than 250 precision munitions on enemy targets.

In June 2014, the last of the units A-10C aircraft departed and the unit was redesignated the 184th Attack Squadron.

=== Lineage ===
- Designated 184th Tactical Reconnaissance Squadron and allotted to Arkansas ANG in 1953

Extended federal recognition on 15 October 1953
Federalized and placed on active duty on 1 October 1961
Released from active duty and returned to Arkansas state control on 22 August 1962
Redesignated 184th Tactical Fighter Squadron on 1 July 1972
Redesignated 184th Fighter Squadron on 16 March 1992 (Note: When elements of the squadron are the primary force provider for a deployed expeditionary mission they are designated the 184th Expeditionary Fighter Squadron.)
Redesignated 184th Attack Squadron on June 2014

=== Assignments ===
- 118th Tactical Reconnaissance Group, 15 October 1953
- 123d Tactical Reconnaissance Wing, 1 October 1961
- 188th Tactical Reconnaissance Group (later 188th Tactical Fighter Group, 188th Fighter Group), 22 August 1962
- 188th Operations Group, 1 October 1995 – present

=== Stations ===
- Fort Smith Regional Airport (later Ebbing Air National Guard Base), Arkansas, 15 October 1953

=== Aircraft ===
- RB-26C Invader, 1953–1956
- RF-80A Shooting Star, 1956–1957
- RF-84F Thunderstreak, 1957–1970
- RF-101C Voodoo, 1970–1972
- F-100D/F Super Sabre, 1972–1979
- F-4C Phantom II, 1979-1998
- Block 15 F-16A/B Fighting Falcon, 1988–2001
- Block 32 F-16C Fighting Falcon, 2001–2007
- A-10 Thunderbolt II, 2007–2014
- MQ-9 Reaper, 2014–present
