= KFSM =

KFSM may refer to:

- KFSM-TV, a television station (channel 5 virtual/18 digital) licensed to Fort Smith, Arkansas, United States
- the ICAO code for Fort Smith Regional Airport
- King's Fire Service Medal (United Kingdom)
