= Ebbing Air National Guard Base =

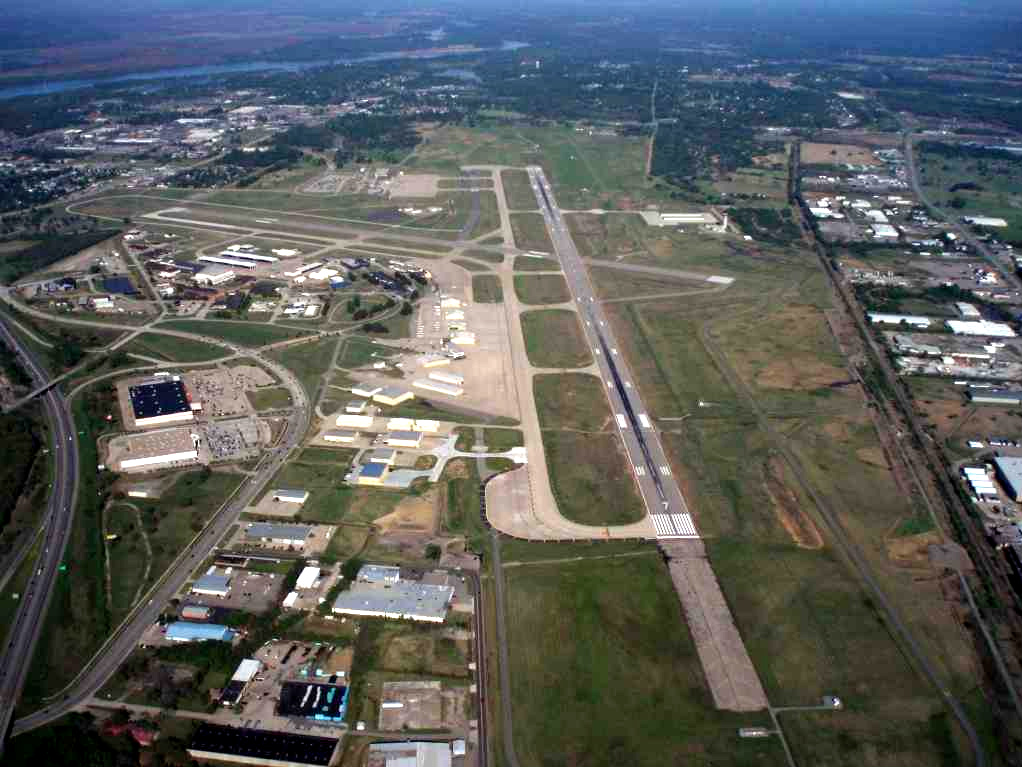
- IATA: FSM; ICAO: KFSM; FAA LID: FSM; WMO: 72344

Summary
- Airport type: Public
- Owner: Fort Smith Airport Commission
- Serves: Fort Smith, Arkansas
- Elevation AMSL: 469 ft (143 m)
- Coordinates: 35°20′12″N 094°22′03″W
- Website: www.fortsmithairport.com

Map
- Location of airport in Arkansas FSM (the United States)

Runways
Direction	Length		Surface
Direction	ft	m	Surface
1/19	5,001	1,524	Asphalt
7/25	8,017	2,444	Asphalt

Statistics (2011)
- Aircraft operations: 41,990
- Based aircraft: 102
- Source: Federal Aviation Administration

Ebbing Air National Guard Base is an airfield adjacent to the Fort Smith Regional Airport, with which it shares runways.

It was established in 1953. Since 1953, the Arkansas Air National Guard's 188th Wing (188 WG) has been based at the airfield. Formerly a fighter wing that previously operated F-4 Phantom II, F-16 Fighting Falcon, and A-10 Thunderbolt II aircraft, the 188th Wing currently features three primary mission sets: Remotely Piloted Aircraft (MQ-9 Reaper); ISR (Distributed Ground Station-Arkansas); and Targeting (Space-Focused).

Air traffic services are provided by the Federal Aviation Administration (FAA) from an air traffic control (ATC) tower and TRACON (terminal radar approach control).

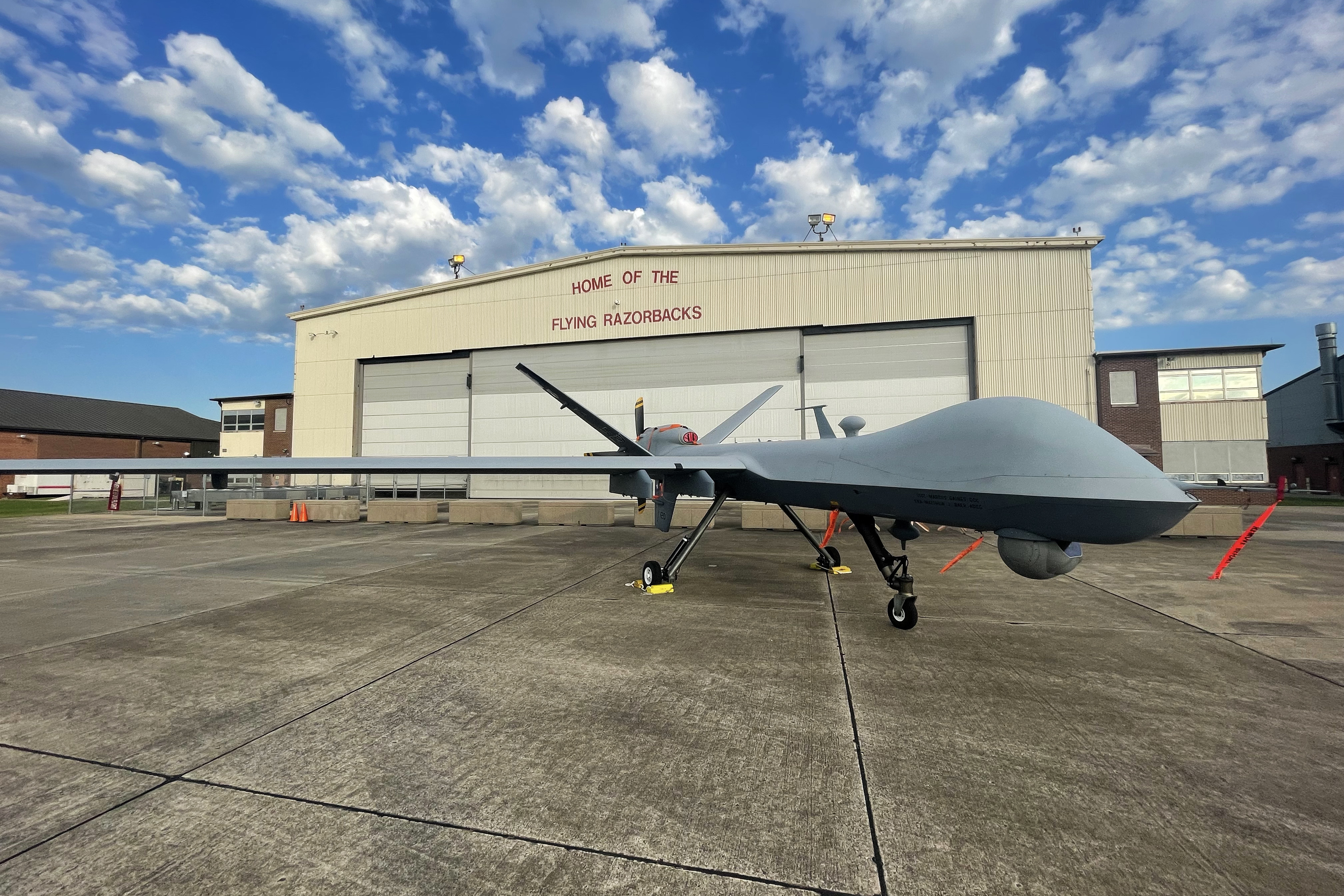
An MQ-9 Reaper at Ebbing Air National Guard Base

The 188th Wing is based there, currently operating remotely piloted aircraft. The Republic of Singapore Air Force is planning to set up its F-16 and F-35 training detachment starting with the first aircraft to be based there in 2023.

On January 31, 2025, A Polish Air Force F-35A pilot took off from Ebbing and completed its first flight in its training. Poland will start training its pilots at Ebbing and its first pilots will graduate by the spring of 2025.

Ebbing ANGB is named in honor of Major Henry F. Ebbing, who died in a training mission in 1970.
