= George Legrady =

Canadian digital media artist (born 1950)

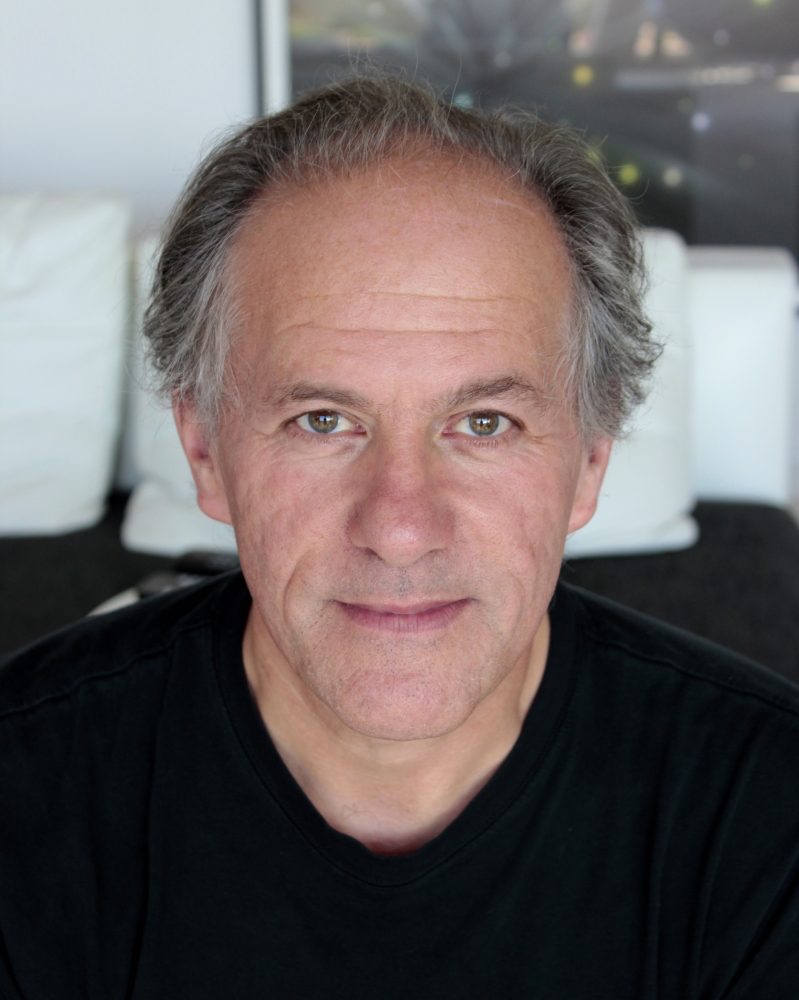
- Born: January 8, 1950 (age 76); Budapest, Hungary
- Known for: Artist, professor
- Spouse: Olivia Harris (2008-)

George Legrady (Légrády György, Tamás, Antal, Tivadar, born January 8, 1950) is a multidisciplinary digital media artist and university professor in photography and computational media arts.

== Early life and education ==
Legrady was born in Budapest, Hungary, and emigrated to Montreal, Quebec, Canada at age 6 with his parents and brothers Miklos and Thomas under political refugee status in November 1956 during the Hungarian Revolution. His father, nl:Thomas Legrady was a musician and composer. His paternal great-grandfather Légrády Tivadar was a lithographer and co-founder with his brother hu:Légrády Károly, of the Légrády Testvérek publishing house in Budapest. His maternal great-grandfather, hu:Váradi Antal, was a playwright, poet, and director of the Hungarian National Academy of Dramatic Arts in Budapest.

Legrady attended French elementary school in Montreal at pensionnat Mont Jésus-Marie, Outremont with his brother Miklos, where both studied classical music. They completed their high-school degrees in English at Marymount High in Cote-Saint Luc. Between the age of fourteen to twenty, he worked in construction, factories, and underground mining in northern Manitoba, also as a keyboardist in various Montreal bands such as the Mike Jones Group, the Haunted, and the Urge. In the late 1960s he was an occasional member of both the Musicians’ Union and the Steelworkers Union.

In 1969, he studied English literature at Loyola College, Montreal, where he was introduced to photography as an artform by painter/photographer Charles Gagnon, and photographer John Max. After a one-year travel in Europe and the Middle East, he attended Goddard College, Vermont in 1971. He later received a Master of Fine Arts degree in photography from the San Francisco Art Institute in 1976.

== Artistic career ==
He began his photographic artistic practice in Montreal. In 1973, he realized his first major project, a photo documentary in northern Quebec of four James Bay Cree communities in response to the James Bay Cree hydroelectric conflict. Following graduate studies at the San Francisco Art Institute in the mid 1970s, his work resulted in numerous projects that focused on a semiotic analysis of the photographic image. In 1985, he produced a photo documentary on the visual syntax of public billboards in four major Chinese cities.

Legrady began to explore the potential of digital technologies in the early 1980s in the studio of Harold Cohen at the University of California, San Diego. His contribution to the digital media field since the early stages of its formation in the early 1990s has been in intersecting cultural content with data processing. This is a means of creating aesthetic and socio-cultural narrative experiences. In 1997, the digital catalog of his solo museum exhibition at the National Gallery of Canada and the Canadian Museum of Photography, tracing the transition from photography to interactive media installations in his artworks, is now featured online at the Daniel Langlois Foundationfor Arts, Science, & Technology.

His most significant interactive digital media arts projects include the "Anecdoted Archive from the Cold War" in 1993, "Slippery Traces" in 1995, published by the ZKM Museum in Karlsruhe. His data visualization project "Making Visible the Invisible" for the Seattle Central Library began in September, 2005 and continues to this day, collecting and visualizing data by the hour. It was featured in the Whitney Museum Artport online exhibition in 2005. Commissioned by the Centre Pompidou and travelling internationally from 2001 to 2006, the data collecting installation "Pockets Full of Memories" invited visitors to contribute objects in their possession, digitally scanning and describing them. This information was stored in a database and organized by the Kohonen Self-Organizing Map algorithm that positioned objects of similar descriptions near each other in a two-dimensional map. The map of objects was projected in the gallery space and was also accessible online at where individuals in the gallery and at home could review the objects and add comments and stories to any of them. Legrady has lectured internationally, including in the Revue virtuelle program at the Centre Pompidou with philosopher Pierre Levy and media artist Nam June Paik, and also in the Video Viewpoints series at the Museum of Modern Art.

== Awards ==
Between 1979 and 2014, Legrady received numerous Canada Council Arts grants in photography and media arts, including a Canada Council Paris studio residency. In 1987 he was awarded a University of Southern California Innovative Teaching Award, an Innovative Research Award, and a major equipment award through the IBM Socrates program to set up digital computing as part of the studio fine arts curriculum. Other awards include a National Endowment of the Arts Visual Arts Fellowship (1996), a Langlois Foundation for the Arts, Science & Technology grant (2000), a Creative Capital Foundation Emerging Fields (2002), and a in Fine Arts, in 2016.

Legrady is the recipient of 2 National Science Foundation grants, one in Information & Intelligence Systems (2011) that resulted in the Swarm Vision/Auto Vision, multi-camera systems projects, and the other, an Arctic Social Science (2012) to digitize and repatriate his 1973 photographs of the James Bay Cree communities in sub-arctic Quebec.

Legrady is one of five artists that art historian Patrick Frank examines in his 2024 book Art of the 1980s: As If the Digital Mattered.

== Exhibitions ==
George Legrady has exhibited his installations internationally at venues that include the National Gallery of Canada, Centre Pompidou in Paris, San Francisco Museum of Art, MOCA Los Angeles, MOCA Taipei, Chronus Art Center in Shanghai, musée des beaux-arts in Brussels, Haus der Kunst in Munich, PS1, La Jolla Museum of Contemporary Art, Kunsthalle in Bonn, Davis Gallery at Wellesley, Cornerhouse Gallery in Manchester, the Vancouver Olympics in 2010, and others.

== Public collections ==
Legrady's work is part of numerous public collections such as the San Francisco Museum of Modern Art, Whitney Museum of Art, 21c Museum, Cincinnati, LACMA (Vernon photography collection), Pro Ahlers Art foundation, Philbrook Museum of Art, Centre for Art & Technology (ZKM), American Museum of Art, Smithsonian Institution in Washington, National Galleries of Canada, Musée d’art contemporain, Montreal, and others.
