= Revue virtuelle =

Revue virtuelle (1992–1996) was an exhibition project for early new media, virtual art technologies, computer graphics, virtual reality, hypermedia and digital art projects that was housed in the Musée National d'Art Moderne, Centre Pompidou from1992 to 1996.

It also created a virtual "magazine" jointly created by the museum and the Centre de Création Industrielle, addressing new technologies from the viewpoints of science, aesthetics, museography and education. These activities were documented in a bilingual CD-ROM, L'Actualité du Virtuel/Actualizing the Virtual, published in 1996.

== Revue virtuelle history ==
- Number 1: Definitions

Lecture: Edmond Couchot - 15 April 1992

- Number 2-3: Anthologies

Exhibition: 17 June - 11 October 1992 Lecture: Anne-Marie Duguet - 23 September 1992

- Number 4: Real-Virtual

Exhibition: 9 December 1992 - 24 January 1993 Lecture: Scott S Fisher - 9 December 1992

- Number 5: Images évolutives

Exhibition: 3 March - 2 May 1993 Lecture: Karl Sims - 4 March 1993

- Numbers 6-7: The Virtual in Questions

Exhibition: 2 June - 19 September 1993 Lecture: Derrick de Kerckhove - 3 June 1993

- Number 8: The Digital Herbarium

Exhibition: 13 October 1993 - 2 January 1994 Lecture: Philippe de Reffye - 13 October 1993

- Number 9: The Virtual Body

Exhibition: 2 March - 2 May 1994 Lecture: Dr. Karl Heinz Höhne - 7 April 1994

- Numbers 10-11: The Art of Games

Exhibition: 6 July - 26 September 1994 Lecture: Alain Le Diberder, Matt Mullican, Florian Rötzer - 14 September 1994

- Number 12: The Hypermedia

Exhibition: 9 November 1994 - 23 January 1995 Lecture: George Legrady, Pierre Lévy, Nam June Paik - 9 November 1994

- Number 13: Networks as Spaces for Writing

Lecture: Friedrich Kittler, Geert Lovink - 31 May 1995

- Number 14: Architecture and Interactivity

Lecture: Elizabeth Diller and Ricardo Scofido - 18 October 1995

- Number 15: Virtuality and Subjectivity

Lecture: Siegfried Zielinski, Knowbotic Research (Christian Hübler and Yvonne Wilhelm) - 31 January 1996

- Number 16: Digital Arts and Digital Media

Lecture: Jean-Marie Schaeffer - 23 February 1996

- Number 17: The InterCommunication Center Project (Tokyo)

Lecture: Akira Asada, Toshiharu Itoh - 24 June 1996

== See also ==
- New media
- New media art
