= 188th Wing =

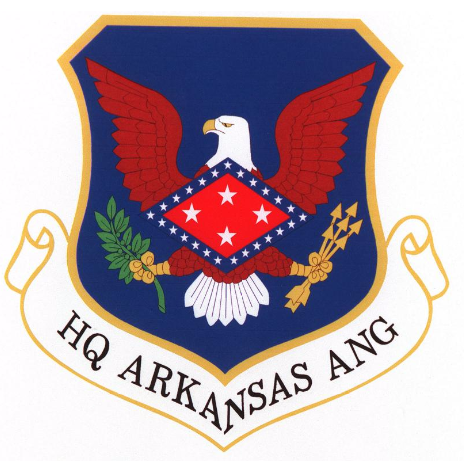
188th Wing

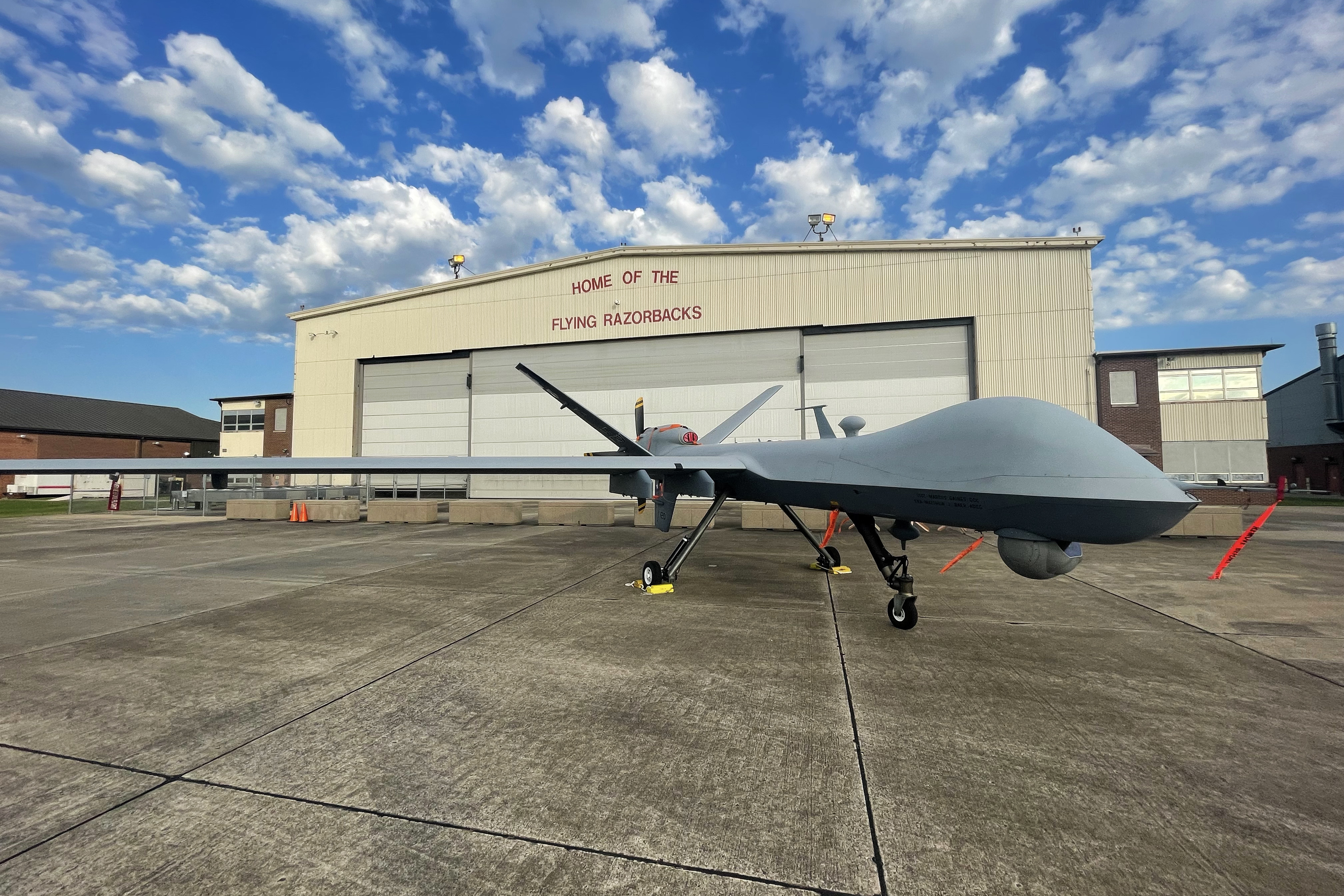
- MQ-9 Reaper at Ebbing Air National Guard Base
- Active: 1962–present
- Country: United States
- Allegiance: Arkansas
- Branch: Air National Guard
- Type: Wing
- Role: Attack; Intelligence, Surveillance, Reconnaissance; Targeting
- Part of: Arkansas Air National Guard
- Garrison/HQ: Ebbing Air National Guard Station, Arkansas
- Nickname: Flying Razorbacks
- Mottos: Videre Scire Est (Latin for 'To See Is To Know'); Vigilius Animus (Latin for 'We Are On Guard') (Note: The motto used as a reconnaissance unit was replaced when the unit became a fighter group. It was later restored in English.)
- Decorations: Meritorious Unit Award Air Force Outstanding Unit Award

Insignia
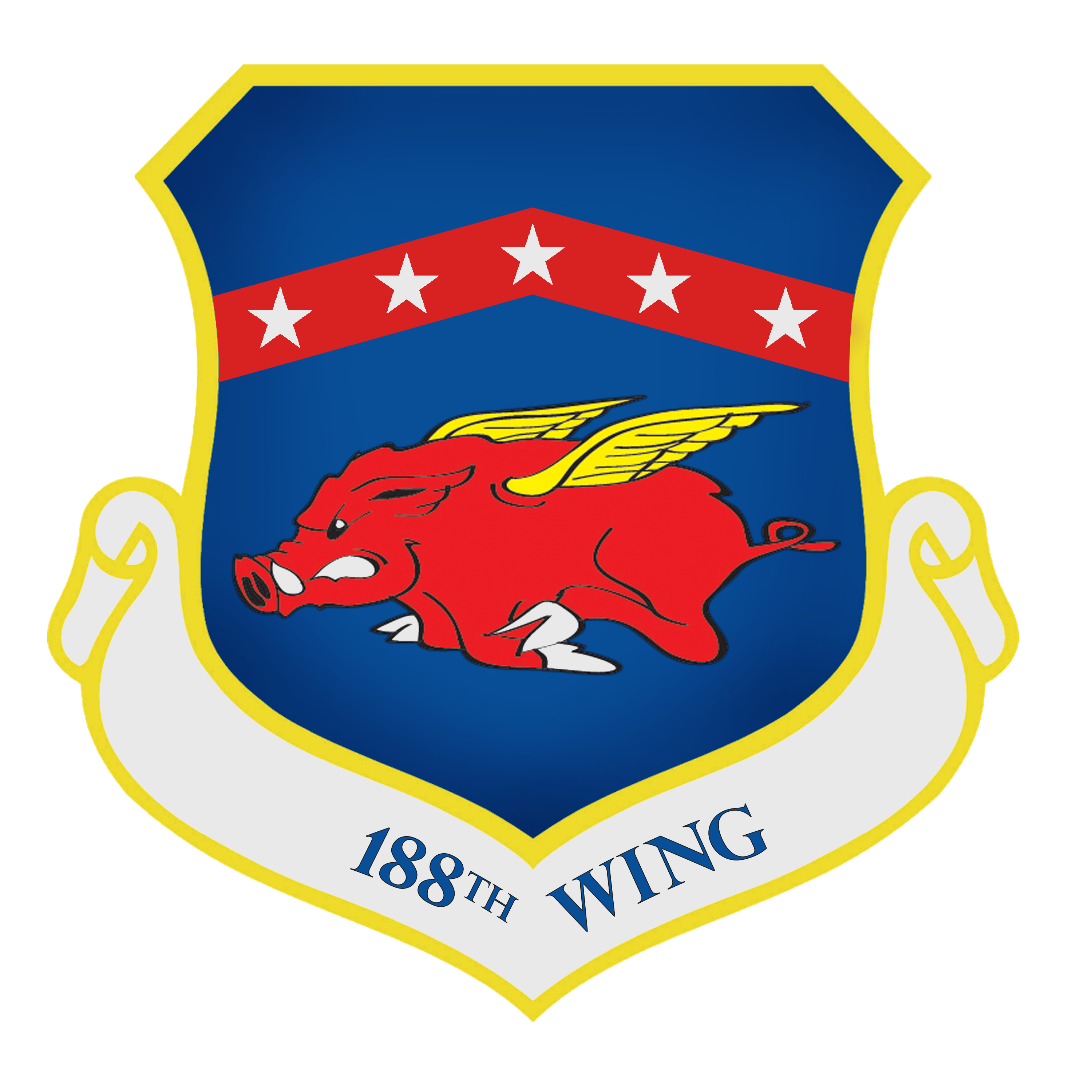
- 188th Wing emblem

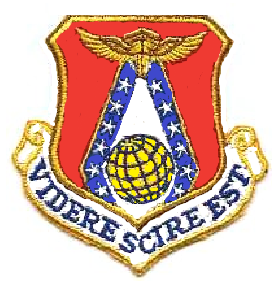
- 188th Tactical Reconnaissance Group emblem
- Tail markings: Red stripe with Arkansas in white, Code FS

The 188th Wing is a unit of the Arkansas Air National Guard, stationed at Ebbing Air National Guard Base, Fort Smith, Arkansas. The 188th is equipped with the MQ-9 Reaper. If activated to federal service, the Wing is gained by the United States Air Force Air Combat Command.

== Mission ==
The 188th Wing is a Remotely Piloted Aircraft (MQ-9 Reaper), Space Focused Targeting, Intelligence, Surveillance and Reconnaissance Unit based in Fort Smith, Arkansas. The men and women of the 188th are able to rapidly deploy and support ground forces all over the world.

== Units ==
The 188th Wing consists of the following 4 groups, each of which has multiple squadrons, flights and sections assigned:

- 188th Mission Support Group
  - 188th Security Forces Squadron
  - 188th Civil Engineer Squadron
  - 188th Logistics Readiness Squadron
  - 188th Force Support Squadron
  - 188th Communications Flight
- 188th Medical Group
- 188th Wing Staff
- 188th Intelligence, Surveillance and Reconnaissance Group
  - 123rd Intelligence Squadron
  - 153rd Intelligence Squadron
  - 188th Intelligence Support Squadron
  - 288th Operations Support Squadron
- 188th Operations Group
  - 184th Attack Squadron (MQ-9 Reaper)
  - 188th Operations Support Squadron

== History ==
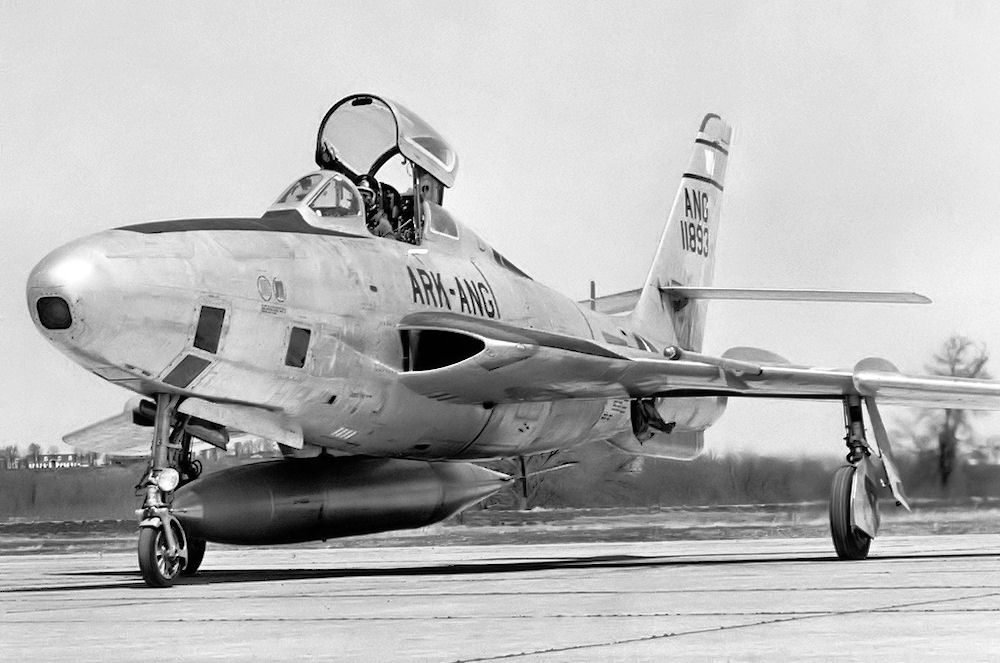
184th Tactical Reconnaissance Squadron RF-84F Thunderstreak in 1958

On 22 August 1962, the Arkansas Air National Guard 184th Tactical Reconnaissance Squadron was authorized to expand to a group level, and the 188th Tactical Reconnaissance Group was established by the National Guard Bureau. The 184th TRS becoming the group's flying squadron. Other squadrons assigned into the group were the 188th Headquarters, 188th Material Squadron (Maintenance), 188th Combat Support Squadron, and the 188th USAF Dispensary. The 184th TRS was equipped with the RF-84F Thunderstreak.

In 1970 with the winding-down of the Vietnam War, the 184th began receiving McDonnell RF-101C Voodoos, replacing the RF-84Fs the unit had been flying for over a decade. The USAF had, however, planned for the RF-101C to be gradually phased out of USAF service in favor of the McDonnell RF-4C Phantom II and the aircraft remained with the 184th TRS for only a brief period of time, and in 1970 was retired.

=== Tactical Fighter ===
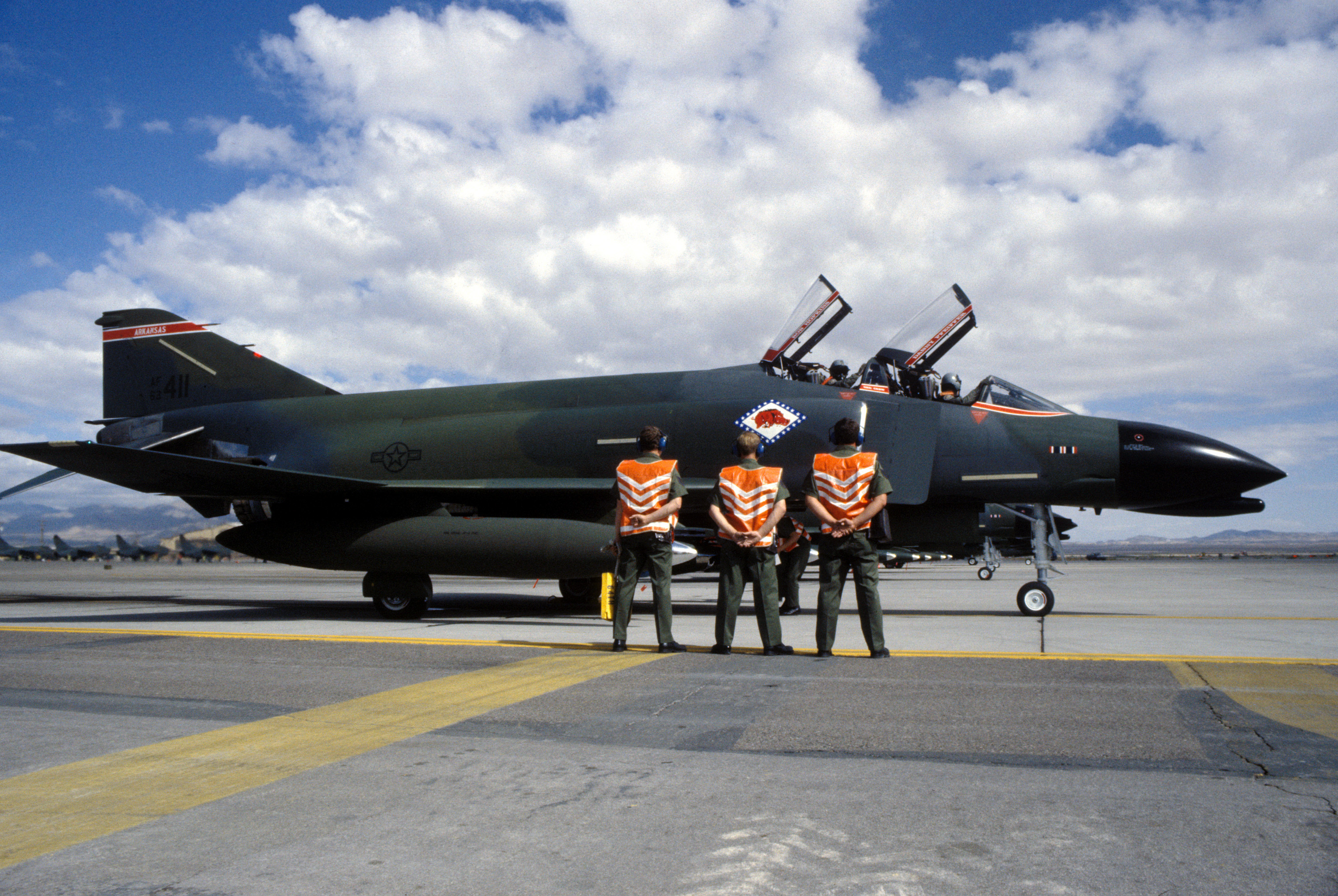
Group F-4C Phantom prepares for take-off during the Gunsmoke 85 competition (Note: Aircraft is McDonnell F-4C-15-MC Phantom II, serial 63-7411. Taken at Nellis Air Force Base, Nevada exercise on 6 October 1985.)

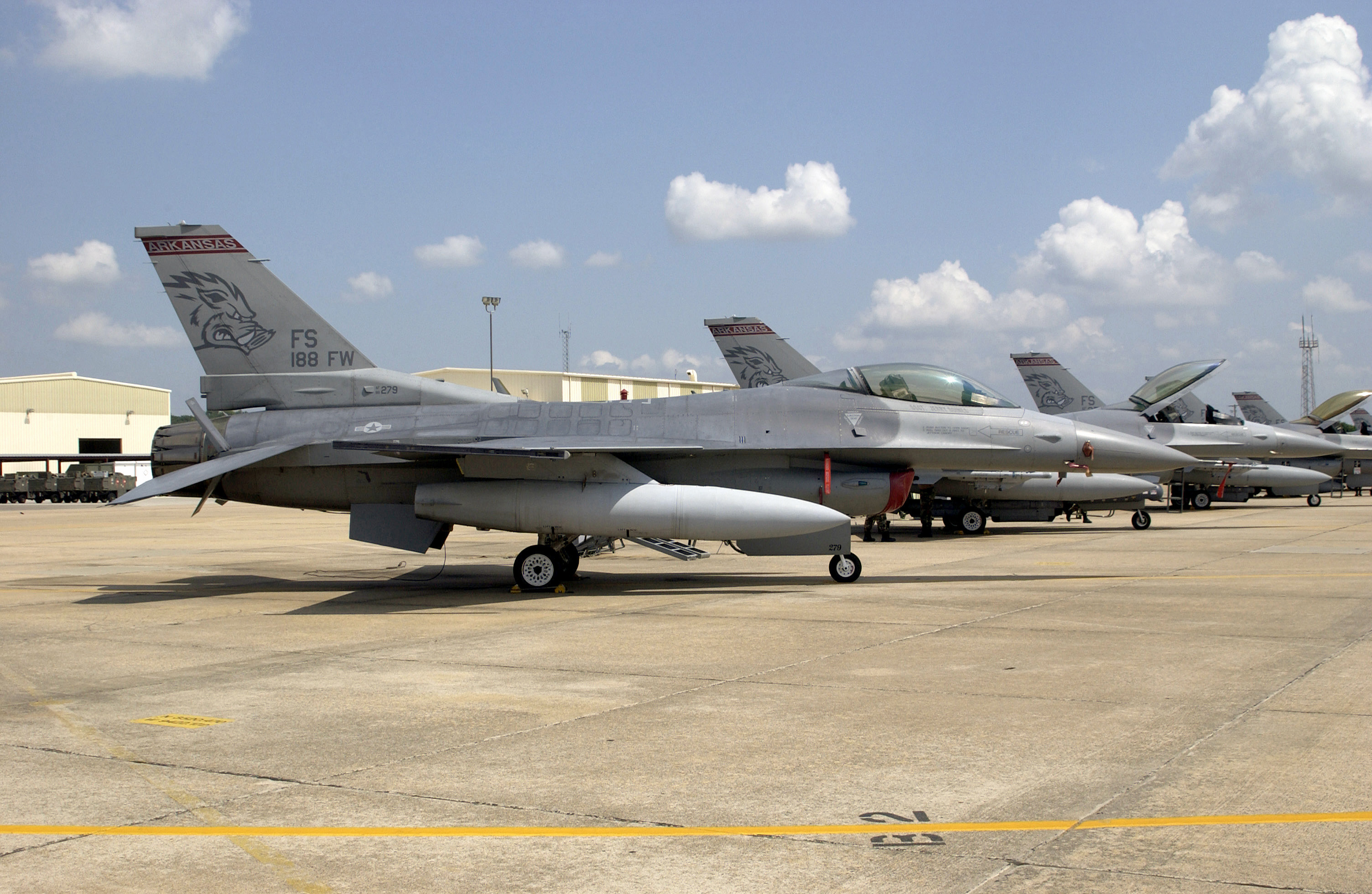
F-16Cs Arkansas ANG at Ft Smith 2002

Following their withdrawal from the Vietnam War, numerous USAF F-100D Super Sabres were turned over to the Air National Guard. Tactical Air Command realigned the 188th into a Tactical Fighter Group in 1972, and equipping the unit with Vietnam Veteran F-100D and twin-seat F-100F Trainers. In 1979, the Super Sabre was being retired and the 184th TFS began receiving F-4C Phantom IIs to be used in an air defense role. In 1988, as part of the retirement of the Phantom II, the squadron began receiving Block 15 F-16A Fighting Falcons. The first F-16 delivery to the squadron was on 1 July 1988 and the formal acceptance of the F-16 happened on 15 October. On 15 March 1992 the 184th dropped the Tactical name from the squadron as the parent 184th converted to the USAF Objective organization.

In early 2001 the 184th FS began to retire its F-16A/B block 15s to AMARC in exchange for F-16C block 32s. They never received any D-models. Because the squadron flew the rarely seen block 32, the squadron became a source for spare F-16s for the USAF Thunderbirds flight demonstration team. In 2004, 188th F-16C 86-0281 was reassigned from the 188th to the Thunderbirds to replace the aircraft lost at Mountain Home AFB in 2003. It flew with the Thunderbirds in the 2004 through 2008 season. On November 2026, it was moved from Sheppard AFB by retirees from the 188th Wing and reassembled for display at the Tulsa Air and Space Museum as Thunderbird 5.

The 188 FW was deployed to Prince Sultan AB, Saudi Arabia (24 October 2002 to December 2002) in support of Operation Southern Watch. In 2005, the 188th deployed nearly 300 Airmen and multiple F-16C Fighting Falcons to Balad Air Base, Iraq, in support of Operation Iraqi Freedom.

=== BRAC 2005 ===
BRAC 2005 initially decided to inactivate the 188th Fighter Wing and close Fort Smith ANGB. With a great deal of effort by Arkansas' leaders caused the BRAC panel to change its decision on the 184th FS and give it a new mission. The squadron would still lose its F-16s but in their place would get a total of eighteen A-10 Thunderbolt II ground attack aircraft. One of the deciding factors was Fort Smiths location near Fort Chaffee, a former National Guard training post.

On 18 October 2006 the 184th FS began giving up F-16s when two departed for the 194th Fighter Squadron located at Fresno Air National Guard Base, California. By April 2007 the 184th FS had already begun to receive the A-10 from the Massachusetts ANG 104th Fighter Wing and pilots had already commenced cross training in October. On 14 April 2007 the 184th FS marked the day with a celebration 'Viper Out/Warthog In' day. The 184th FS took the opportunity to display their new A-10 paint scheme and to still fly the F-16 but the 184th FS at this point was officially an A-10 unit.

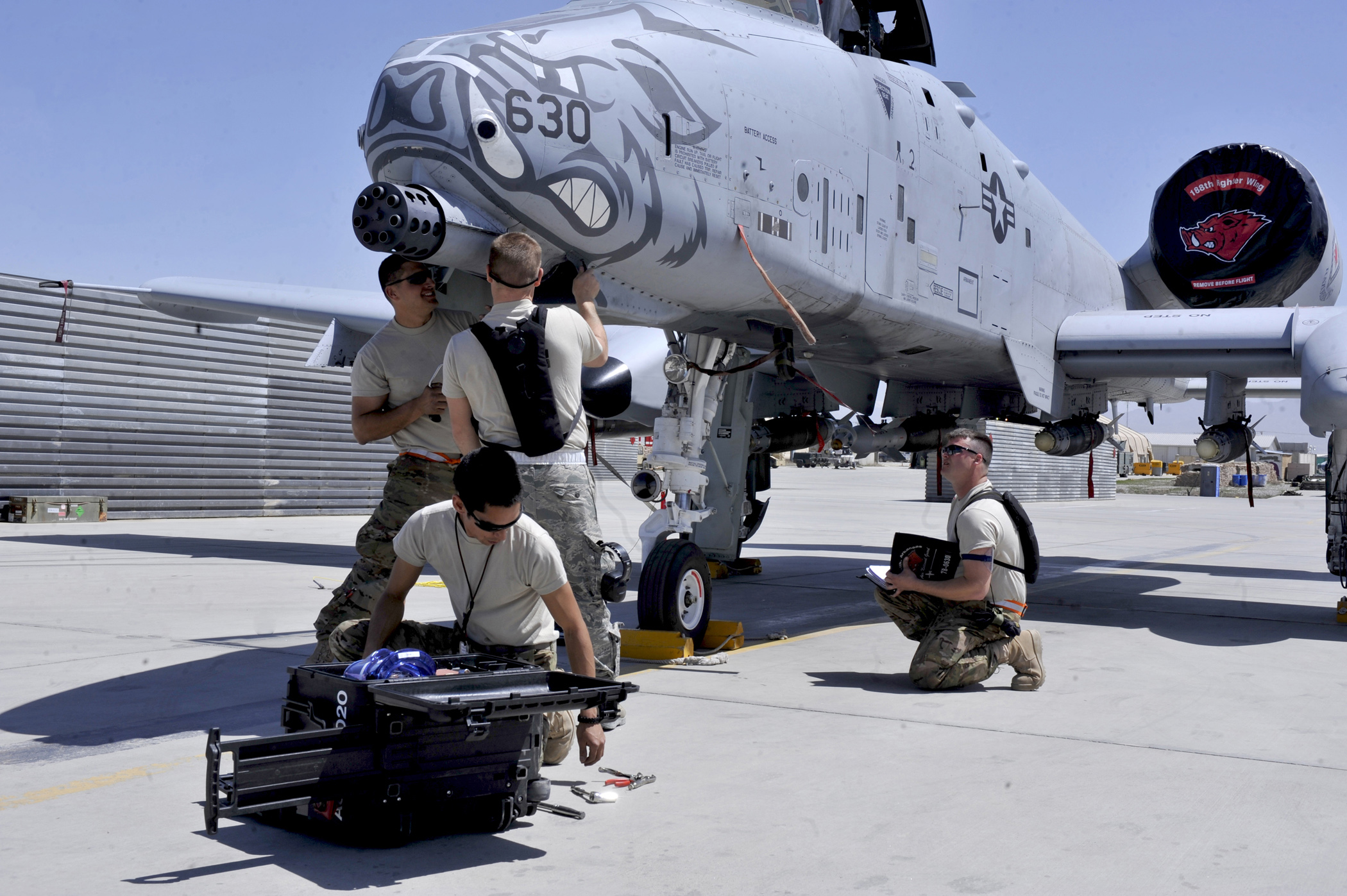
188th Wing A-10 Thunderbolt II at Bagram Airfield in 2012

=== Current status ===
Between late March and early July 2012, the Wing deployed 375 Airmen and 10 aircraft to Afghanistan in support of Operation Enduring Freedom. They were assigned to the 455th Air Expeditionary Wing, Bagram Airfield, near Kabul. This was the second AEF deployment for the 188th as a unit since receiving A-10 Thunderbolt II "Warthogs" 14 April 2007. The 188th's last AEF deployment transpired in 2010 when the unit deployed about 300 Airmen and 12 A-10Cs to the 451st Air Expeditionary Wing at Kandahar Airfield.

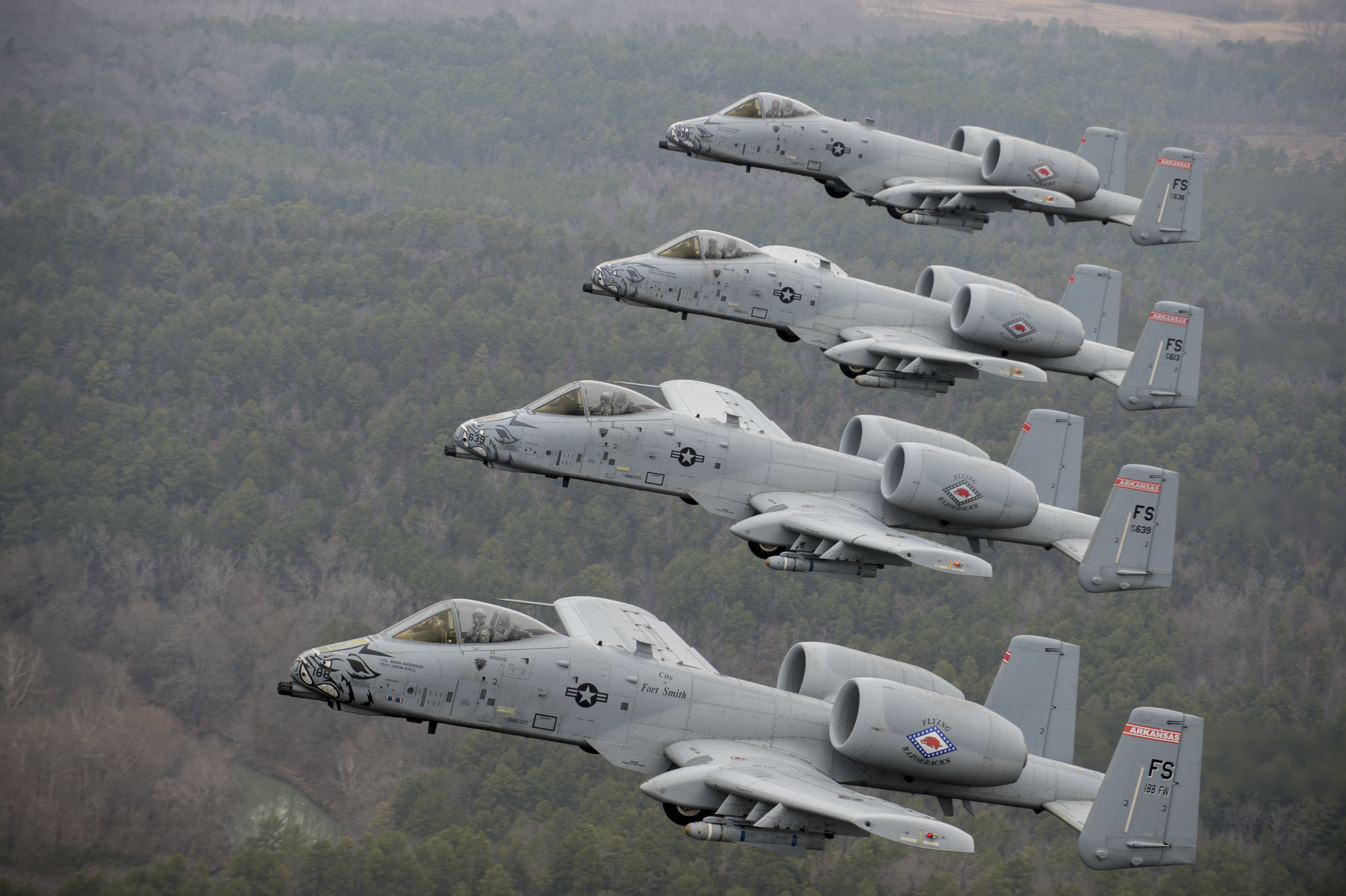
188th Fighter Wing A-10 Thunderbolt IIs over Razorback Range, Arkansas in 2013

The Guardsmen remained in Afghanistan until October, flying close-air support in response to ground troops who may be in contact with the enemy, or to escort convoys in particularly hostile areas. When not supporting ground troops, A-10s patrol designated sectors and provided aerial reconnaissance on locations of interest to ground commanders. In three months, Arkansas ANG A-10s delivered more than 60,000 30mm cannon rounds and more than 250 precision munitions on enemy targets.

In early 2013 the Air Force planned to realign the 188th Fighter Wing and replace its 20 A-10 aircraft, converting the 184th FS to operate the General Atomics [MQ-9 Reaper] remotely piloted aircraft (RPA). On 7 June 2014, the last A-10 aircraft departed the 188th Fighter Wing. At the same time, the 184th Fighter Squadron was re-designated the 184th Attack Squadron.

In late 2014 the 188th Fire Department which supported the fighter wing operations, but also covered the regional airport, was disbanded after over two decades of full-time service.

On 3 June 2021 Ebbing Air National Guard Base was chosen as the location to host a multi-national training site for the F-16C/D Fighting Falcon and F-35A Lightning II. The 188th Wing will become a host unit for these new aircraft.

== Lineage ==
- Constituted as the 188th Tactical Reconnaissance Group on 11 September 1962 and allotted to the Air National Guard

Activated on 15 October 1962 and federally recognized
Redesignated 188th Tactical Fighter Group on 15 June 1972
Redesignated 188th Fighter Group on 16 March 1992
Redesignated 188th Fighter Wing on 1 October 1995
Redesignated 188th Wing on 7 June 2014

=== Assignments ===
- 117th Tactical Reconnaissance Wing, 15 October 1962
- 127th Tactical Reconnaissance Wing, c. 1 August 1965
- 140th Tactical Fighter Wing, 15 June 1972
- 131st Tactical Fighter Wing, c. 1978
- Arkansas Air National Guard, 1 October 1995 – present

Gained by: Tactical Air Command, 15 October 1962
Gained by: Air Combat Command, 1 June 1992 – present

=== Components ===
- 188th Operations Group, 1 October 1995 – present
- 184th Tactical Reconnaissance Squadron (later 184th Tactical Fighter Squadron, 184th Fighter Squadron, 184th Attack Squadron), 22 August 1962 – present

=== Stations ===
- Fort Smith Regional Airport, Fort Smith, Arkansas, 15 October 1962

Designated Ebbing Air National Guard Station, 1991 – present

=== Aircraft ===
- RF-84F Thunderstreak, 1962–1970
- RF-101C Voodo, 1970–1972
- F-100D/F Super Sabre, 1972–1979
- F-4C Phantom II, 1979–1988
- Block 15 F-16A/B Fighting Falcon, 1988–2001
- Block 32 F-16C Fighting Falcon, 2001–2007
- A-10 Thunderbolt II, 2007–2014
- MQ-9 Reaper, 2014 – present
