= Arkansas Air National Guard =

- Arkansas Air National Guard emblem
- Active: 1947–present
- Country: United States
- Allegiance: Arkansas
- Branch: Air National Guard
- Type: Organized militia Armed forces reserve
- Part of: Arkansas National Guard
- Headquarters: Camp Robinson MTC, North Little Rock, Arkansas

Commanders
- Commander in Chief: Governor Sarah Huckabee Sanders
- The Adjutant General (TAG) of Arkansas: Brigadier General Olen Chad Bridges

Insignia
- Abbreviation: AR ANG

The Arkansas Air National Guard (AR ANG), commonly known as the Arkansas Air Guard, is the aerial militia of the State of Arkansas, United States of America. It is, along with the Arkansas Army National Guard, an element of the Arkansas National Guard, and a reserve of the United States Air Force. As state militia units, the units in the Arkansas Air National Guard are not typically in the normal United States Air Force chain of command unless federalized. They are under the jurisdiction of the governor of Arkansas through the office of the Arkansas Adjutant General unless they are federalized by order of the president of the United States. The Arkansas Air National Guard is headquartered at North Little Rock, and its commander is currently Brigadier General William M. Leahy.

== Overview ==
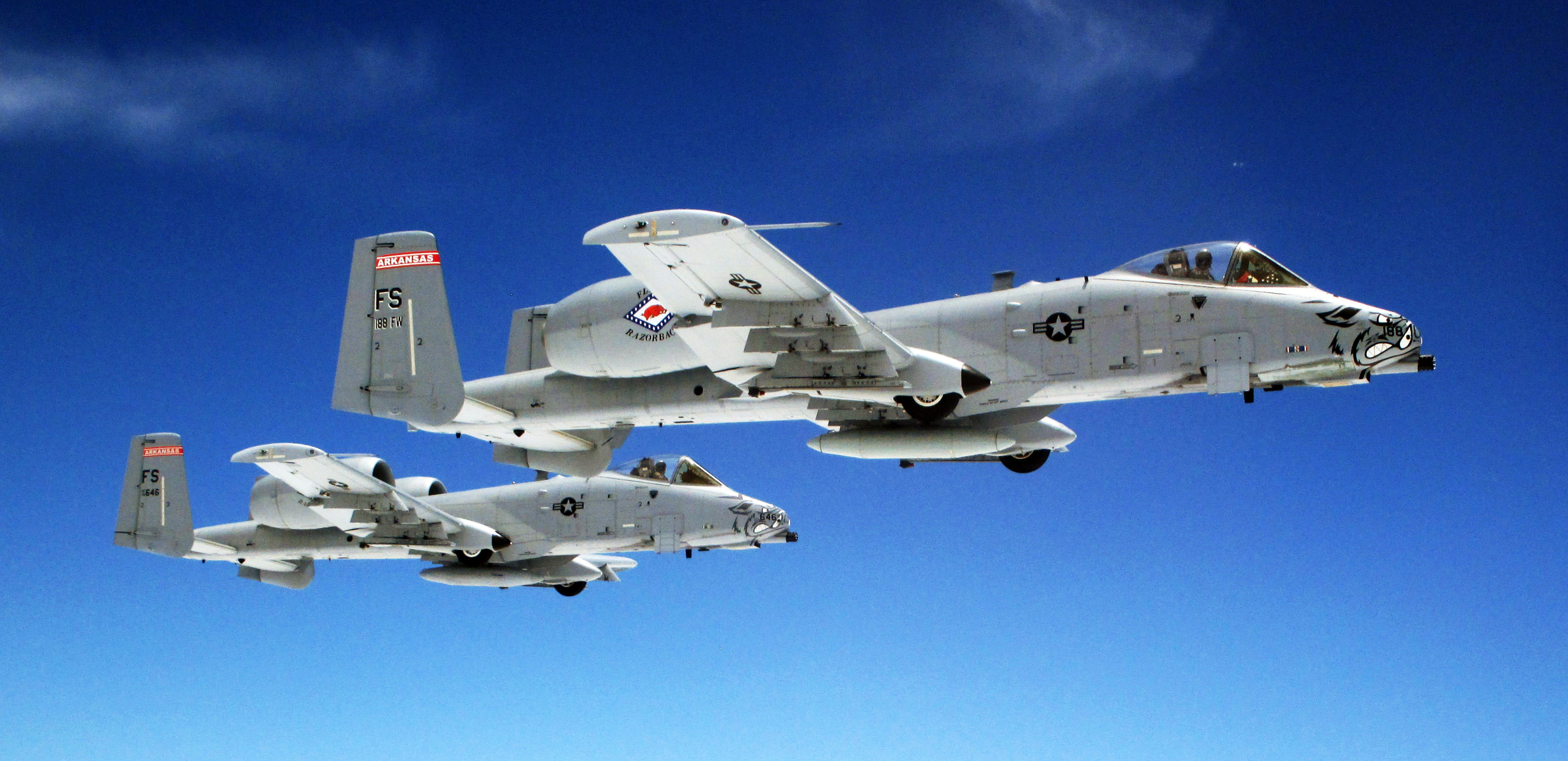
A pair of U.S. Air Force A-10 Thunderbolt II aircraft assigned to the 188th Fighter Wing, fly in formation over Kansas, June 7, 2014

Under the "Total Force" concept, Arkansas Air National Guard units are an Air Reserve Components (ARC) of the United States Air Force (USAF). Arkansas ANG units are trained and equipped by the Air Force and are operationally gained by a major command of the USAF if federalized. In addition, the Arkansas Air National Guard forces are assigned to Air Expeditionary Forces and are subject to deployment tasking orders along with their active duty and Air Force Reserve counterparts in their assigned cycle deployment window.

Along with their federal reserve obligations, as state militia units the elements of the Arkansas ANG are subject to being activated by order of the governor to provide protection of life and property, and preserve peace, order and public safety. State missions include disaster relief in times of earthquakes, hurricanes, floods and forest fires, search and rescue, protection of vital public services, and support to civil defense.

== Components ==
The Arkansas Air National Guard consists of the following major units:

- 189th Airlift Wing

Established 24 October 1925 (as: 154th Observation Squadron); operates: C-130H Hercules
Stationed at: Little Rock Air Force Base, Little Rock
Gained by: Air Mobility Command
The 189th provides aircrew training for the C-130 for all branches of the military and for 23 foreign countries. The unit operates the C-130 Tactical Airlift Instructor School, where aircrew instructors are trained to they can return to their units and keep members combat ready.

- 188th Fighter Wing

Established 15 October 1953 (as: 184th Attack Squadron); operates: MQ-9 Reaper
Stationed at: Ebbing Air National Guard Base, Fort Smith
Gained by: Air Combat Command

Support Unit Functions and Capabilities:

- 123d Intelligence Squadron

Analyzes and exploits imagery products for the Defense Department and other governmental agencies

- 154th Weather Flight

Provides weather forecasts and hurricane warnings to state and Arkansas National Guard units from Little Rock AFB.

== History ==
The Arkansas Air National Guard origins date to 28 August 1917 with the establishment of the 154th Aero Squadron as part of the World War I American Expeditionary Force. The 154th served in France on the Western Front, then after the 1918 Armistice with Germany was demobilized in 1919.

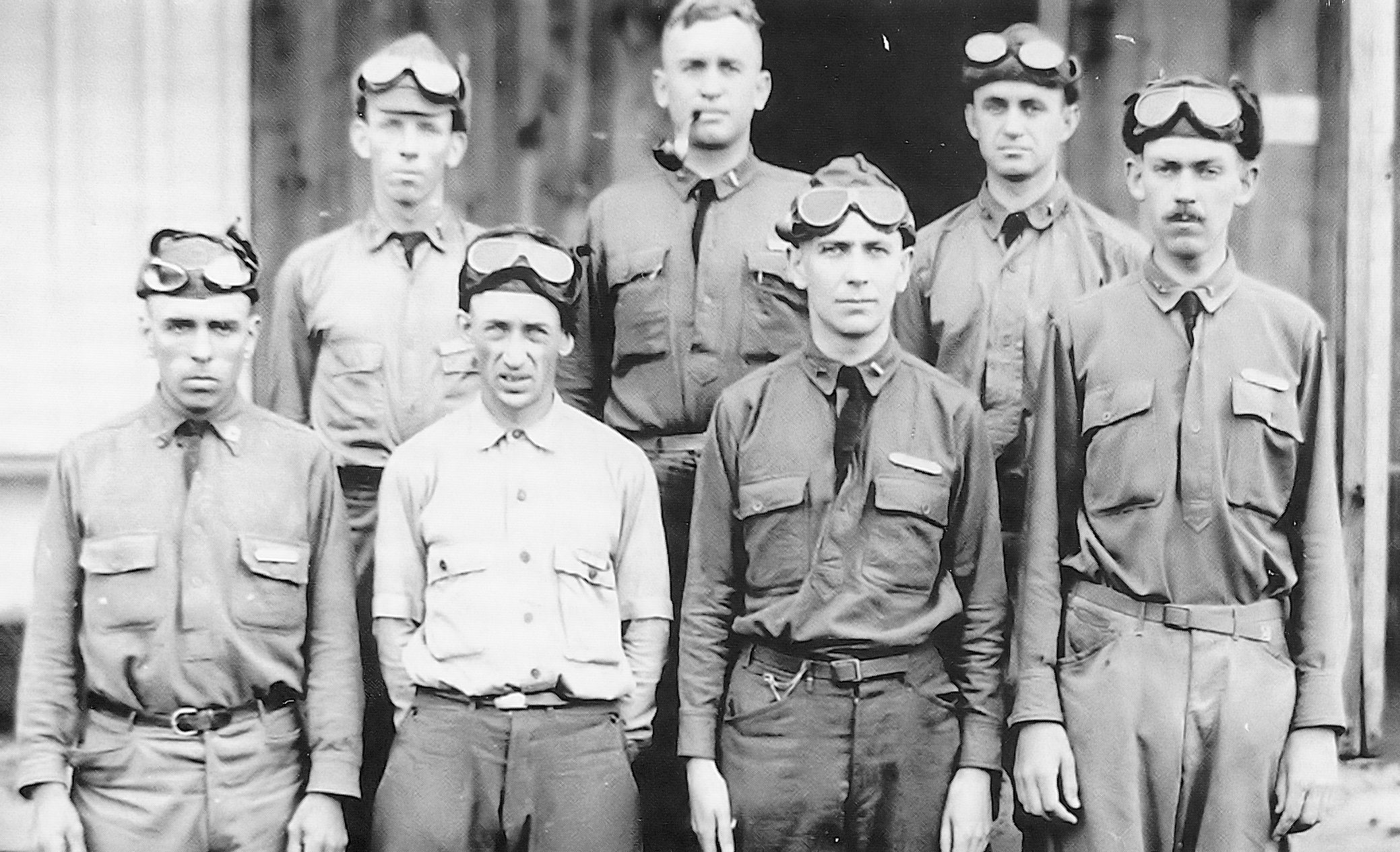
Members of the 154th Observation Squadron, 1925

The Militia Act of 1903 established the present National Guard system, units raised by the states but paid for by the Federal Government, liable for immediate state service. If federalized by Presidential order, they fall under the regular military chain of command. On 1 June 1920, the Militia Bureau issued Circular No.1 on organization of National Guard air units.

The unit was reorganized with the establishment of a permanent air service in 1920 as the 154th Observation Squadron on 24 October 1925, and is oldest unit of the Arkansas Air National Guard. It is one of the 29 original National Guard Observation Squadrons of the United States Army National Guard formed before World War II. The 154th Observation Squadron was activated for one year of training on 16 September 1940. The unit completed its one-year training and returned to state control, but was recalled to active duty on 7 December 1941 as a result of the Japanese attack on Pearl Harbor.

On 24 May 1946, the United States Army Air Forces, in response to dramatic postwar military budget cuts imposed by President Harry S. Truman, allocated inactive unit designations to the National Guard Bureau for the formation of an Air Force National Guard. These unit designations were allotted and transferred to various State National Guard bureaus to provide them unit designations to re-establish them as Air National Guard units.

The modern Arkansas ANG received federal recognition on 27 May 1946 as the 154th Fighter Squadron at Adams Field, Little Rock. It was equipped with F-51D Mustangs and its mission was the air defense of the state. 18 September 1947, however, is considered the Arkansas Air National Guard's official birth concurrent with the establishment of the United States Air Force as a separate branch of the United States military under the National Security Act.

On 2 October 1950, the 154th Fighter Squadron, along with detachment B, 237th Air Services Group and the 154th Utility Flight reported to active duty for service in Korea. The unit went to Langley Air Force Base, VA where it was re-equipped with the F-84E fighter and completed transition training. The 154th flew its first combat sortie 2 May 1951. Initially operating out of Itaeke, Japan the unit later moved to Taegu, Korea. The 154th returned to Arkansas and was relieved from active duty 1 July 1952. While in Korea the 154th flew 3,790 combat sorties and was awarded the Presidential Korean Citation for its service

The 184th Tactical Reconnaissance Squadron was federally recognized on 15 October 1953 at Fort Smith Regional Airport, being equipped with RB-26C Invaders, used for night photo-reconnaissance.

On 22 August 1962, the 184th Tactical Reconnaissance Squadron was authorized to expand to a group level, and the 188th Tactical Reconnaissance Group was established by the National Guard Bureau with the 184th TRS becoming the group's flying squadron. On 1 October, the 154th Tactical Reconnaissance Squadron was authorized to expand to a group level, and the 189th Tactical Reconnaissance Group was allotted by the National Guard Bureau, extended federal recognition and activated.

Following the September 11th, 2001 terrorist attacks on the United States, elements of every Air National Guard unit in Arkansas had been activated in support of the global war on terrorism. Flight crews, aircraft maintenance personnel, communications technicians, air controllers and air security personnel were engaged in Operation Noble Eagle air defense overflights of major United States cities. Additionally, Arkansas ANG units had been deployed overseas as part of Operation Enduring Freedom in Afghanistan and Operation Iraqi Freedom in Iraq.

Today, the 189th Airlift Wing at Little Rock AFB is home to the most experienced C-130 instructor cadre in the world. Since 1998, the primary mission of the 189 AW has been to teach the C-130 Instructor School curriculum for pilots, navigators, flight engineers, and loadmasters. Students include aircrew members from all branches of the DoD, Coast Guard, and many foreign countries. The 188th Fighter Wing's A-10 Thunderbolts at Fort Smith provide close air support to troops on the ground.

== See also ==
- Arkansas Wing, Civil Air Patrol
