= Fort Smith Regional Airport =

Public airport in Fort Smith, Arkansas, US

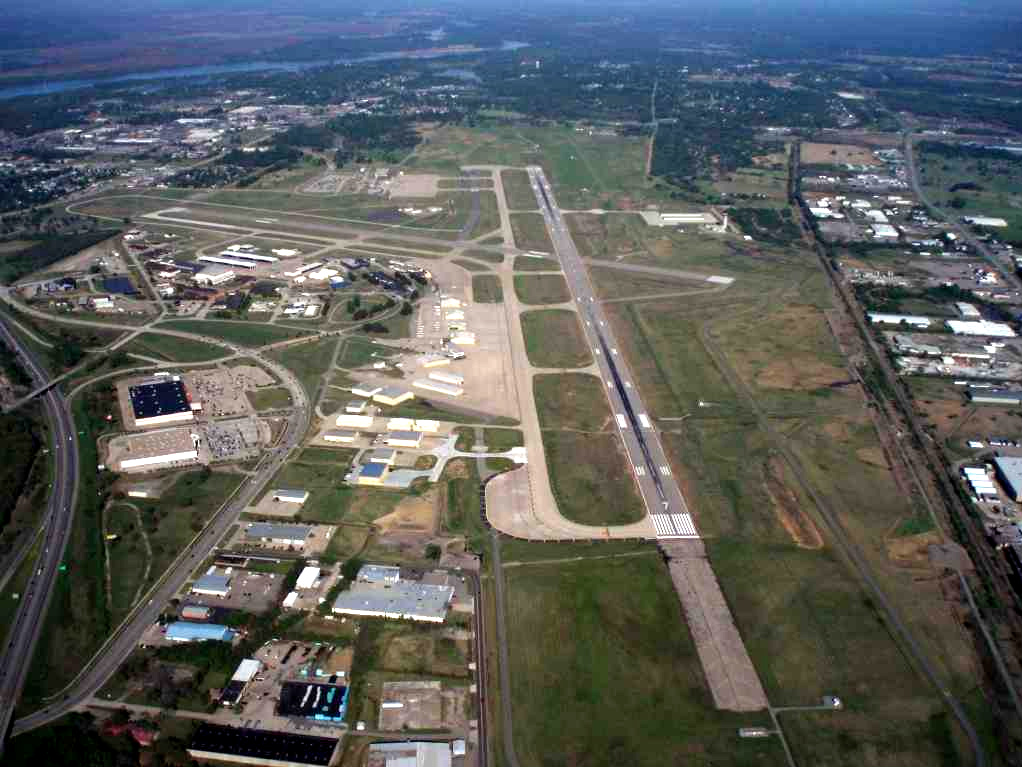
- IATA: FSM; ICAO: KFSM; FAA LID: FSM; WMO: 72344

Summary
- Airport type: Public
- Owner: Fort Smith Airport Commission
- Serves: Fort Smith, Arkansas
- Elevation AMSL: 469 ft (143 m)
- Coordinates: 35°20′12″N 094°22′03″W
- Website: www.fortsmithairport.com

Map
- Location of airport in Arkansas FSM (the United States)

Runways
Direction	Length		Surface
Direction	ft	m	Surface
2/20	5,001	1,524	Asphalt
8/26	9,318	2,840	Asphalt

Statistics (2021)
- Aircraft operations (year ending 6/30/2021): 31,817
- Based aircraft: 77
- Source: Federal Aviation Administration

Fort Smith Regional Airport (IATA: FSM, ICAO: KFSM, FAA LID: FSM) is a public use airport located near the Interstate 540 freeway three nautical miles (6 km) southeast of the central business district of Fort Smith, in Sebastian County, Arkansas, United States. FSM is governed by the Fort Smith Airport Commission as established by the City of Fort Smith, Arkansas. It serves the transportation needs of residents and businesses of western Arkansas and eastern Oklahoma. FSM is currently served by American Eagle, the regional airline affiliate of American Airlines. It has a large population of corporate and general aviation aircraft. A full-service fixed-base operator (FBO), Signature Flight Support, provides service to general aviation, airline, and military operators.

The airport is included in the National Plan of Integrated Airport Systems for 2011–2015, which categorized it as a primary commercial service airport (more than 10,000 enplanements per year). In 2013, the airport had 82,742 passenger boardings (enplanements).

Since 1953, FSM has also been the home to Fort Smith Air National Guard Station and the Arkansas Air National Guard's 188th Wing (188 WG). Formerly a fighter wing that previously operated F-4 Phantom II, F-16 Fighting Falcon, and A-10 Thunderbolt II aircraft, the 188th Wing currently features three primary mission sets: Remotely Piloted Aircraft (MQ-9 Reaper); ISR (Distributed Ground Station-Arkansas); and Targeting (Space-Focused).

Air traffic services are provided by the Federal Aviation Administration (FAA) from an air traffic control (ATC) tower and TRACON (terminal radar approach control). The Fort Smith Air Museum is located within the terminal.

== Facilities and aircraft ==
Fort Smith Regional Airport covers an area of 1,359 acres (550 ha) at an elevation of 469 feet (143 m) above mean sea level. It has two runways with asphalt surfaces: 8/26, the primary runway, is 9,318 by 150 feet (2,840 x 46 m) with dual instrument landing systems and can accommodate the largest aircraft; 2/20, the crosswind runway, is 5,001 by 150 feet (1,524 x 46 m).

For the 12-month period ending June 30, 2021, the airport had 31,817 aircraft operations, an average of 87 per day: 63% general aviation, 25% military, 9% air taxi, and 3% scheduled commercial. At that time there were 77 aircraft based at this airport: 58 single-engine, 12 multi-engine, 5 jet, 1 helicopter, and 1 glider.

== Historical airline service ==
Fort Smith was first served by Braniff International Airways and Mid-Continent Airlines with both airlines commencing service to the airport in the mid 1940s. Braniff began serving Fort Smith with Douglas DC-3 aircraft flying a daily round trip routing of Denver-Colorado Springs-Pueblo-Amarillo-Oklahoma City-Tulsa-Muskogee, OK-Fort Smith, AR-Little Rock-Memphis, TN and later operated Convair 340 and Convair 440 propliners as well as Lockheed L-188 Electra turboprops and British Aircraft Corporation jets followed by Boeing jetliners into the airport. By the early 1950s, Braniff had entered into an interchange flight agreement with Eastern Airlines to extend its Denver-Memphis route south and east to Birmingham, AL, Atlanta, Tampa, and Miami with these flights featuring no change of plane through service. In 1952, four engine Douglas DC-4 aircraft were flown on the interchange service with a daily routing of Denver-Amarillo-Oklahoma City-Tulsa-Fort Smith-Little Rock-Memphis-Birmingham-Atlanta-Tampa-Miami with the return flight from Miami making an additional stop in Colorado Springs before arriving into Denver. By 1966, the Braniff-Eastern interchange service was being operated with a Convair 440 propliner on a daily roundtrip routing of Denver-Colorado Springs-Amarillo-Oklahoma City-Tulsa-Fort Smith-Little Rock-Memphis-Birmingham-Atlanta. In 1967, the two airlines were continuing to operate this interchange service between Denver and Atlanta with Lockheed L-188 Electra turboprops; however, these flights were no longer serving Fort Smith by this time.

In 1965, Braniff International introduced the first scheduled passenger jet service into Fort Smith with British Aircraft Corporation BAC One-Eleven twin jets with nonstop flights at various times during the mid and late 1960s to Little Rock, Shreveport and Tulsa as well as direct no change of plane jet service to Chicago, Dallas, Kansas City, Memphis, Minneapolis/St. Paul, New Orleans, Oklahoma City, Omaha and other destinations. In the spring of 1966, the airline was serving the airport with two BAC One-Eleven jet flights a day on a daily roundtrip routing of Minneapolis/St. Paul-Omaha-Kansas City-Tulsa-Fort Smith-Shreveport-New Orleans in addition to operating services on other routes from Fort Smith with Convair propliners. By the summer of 1968, Braniff was operating six flights a day into the airport including a daily roundtrip BAC One-Eleven service with a routing of Chicago O'Hare Airport-Kansas City-Tulsa-Fort Smith-Shreveport-New Orleans, a BAC One-Eleven flight operating one way Memphis-Little Rock-Fort Smith-Tulsa-Oklahoma City-Dallas Love Field, a BAC One-Eleven service operating one way Amarillo-Oklahoma City-Tulsa-Fort Smith-Little Rock-Memphis, a Lockheed L-188 Electra turboprop flight operating one way Memphis-Little Rock-Fort Smith-Tulsa-Dallas Love Field-Fort Worth Greater Southwest International Airport-Houston Hobby Airport-Corpus Christi, and a Lockheed L-188 Electra turboprop service operating one way Houston Hobby Airport-Dallas Love Field-Tulsa-Fort Smith-Little Rock-Memphis. During the 1970s Braniff operated Boeing 727-100 and Boeing 727-200 jetliners into Fort Smith on routings of Dallas/Ft. Worth-Oklahoma City-Tulsa-Fort Smith-Little Rock-Memphis-Nashville-New York City JFK Airport and Chicago O'Hare Airport-Kansas City-Tulsa-Fort Smith-Shreveport-New Orleans. Both routes were flown with one round trip flight each day. According to the Official Airline Guide (OAG), in early 1976 Braniff was still operating four flights a day into Fort Smith, all with Boeing 727-200 jets, with roundtrip routings of Chicago O'Hare Airport-Kansas City-Tulsa-Fort Smith-Shreveport-New Orleans, and Dallas/Fort Worth-Oklahoma City-Tulsa-Fort Smith-Little Rock-Memphis-Nashville-New York City JFK Airport. All Braniff service to Fort Smith then ended in early 1979 shortly after airline deregulation took effect.

Mid-Continent Airlines began service to Fort Smith in 1946, flying a daily round trip routing of Kansas City-Joplin-Tulsa-Muskogee, OK-Fort Smith-Texarkana-Shreveport-New Orleans with Douglas DC-3 aircraft. Mid-Continent was acquired by and merged into Braniff International in 1952.

Central Airlines began service to Fort Smith in the mid 1950s with flights on routings of Tulsa-Fort Smith-Hot Springs, AR-Little Rock and Ft. Worth-Dallas-Paris, TX-Fort Smith-Fayetteville, AR-Joplin-Kansas City. Another flight would follow the latter route from Texas but at Fayetteville it would instead proceed on to Ft. Leonard Wood and St. Louis. During the mid 1950s, Central served Fort Smith with Douglas DC-3 aircraft and would later upgrade their service with Convair 240 piston and Convair 600 turboprop aircraft.

In 1967 Central Airlines was acquired and merged into the original Frontier Airlines which in turn continued to serve Fort Smith using Convair 580 turboprops in addition to Convair 600 turboprops previously operated by Central with a total of sixteen flights a day operated into the airport with the Convair propjets in the fall of 1967. Frontier soon added Boeing 727-100 jetliners with nonstop service to Dallas Love Field (DAL), Kansas City and St. Louis with daily direct one stop 727 service to Omaha. In the summer of 1968, Frontier was operating six 727 flights every weekday into the airport with two roundtrip flights a day operated on a routing of Dallas Love Field-Fort Smith-St. Louis with a third roundtrip operating a routing of Dallas Love Field-Fort Smith-Kansas City-Omaha in addition to operating twelve flights a day to other destinations with Convair 580 and Convair 600 turboprops for a total of eighteen departures every weekday from the airport at this time. By 1969, Frontier had begun replacing the 727s with Boeing 737-200 jet flights nonstop to Dallas/Ft. Worth (DFW) as well as direct flights to Kansas City via a stop in Joplin and also direct to Denver via a stop in Oklahoma City or Tulsa. In 1976 a multi-stop flight was added on a routing of DFW-Lawton, OK-Oklahoma City-Tulsa-Fort Smith-Little Rock-Memphis using a 737. In the spring of 1981, Frontier was flying nonstop Boeing 737-200 jet service to Atlanta and Wichita, KS with direct service one stop service to Denver via Wichita with this flight then continuing on to Phoenix and Tucson. At this time, the Frontier 737 flight to Atlanta was part of an eastbound routing of Orange County John Wayne Airport-Las Vegas-Denver-Wichita-Fort Smith-Atlanta flown every day except on Saturdays with the airline also operating a 737 flight on Saturdays only on an eastbound routing of Spokane-Missoula-Billings-Denver-Tulsa-Fort Smith with Frontier continuing to operate nonstop Convair 580 flights from Dallas/Ft. Worth and Fayetteville, AR as well as direct flights from Kansas City, Memphis, St. Louis, Denver and Omaha also flown with Convair 580 turboprops for a total of ten flights a day, two with 737s and eight with the Convairs. The Convair 580s were retired in 1982 and service from Fort Smith was reduced to two 737 jet flights per day direct to Denver with each service making one stop enroute in either Oklahoma City or Tulsa. All Frontier service then ended on October 1, 1984.

Scheduled Skyways provided commuter airline service beginning in the late 1970s with nonstop flights to Dallas Love Field (DAL) and Fayetteville, AR using Fairchild Swearingen Metroliner commuter propjets. The Fayetteville-based airline, which was also known as Skyways, subsequently added new flights from Fort Smith to Dallas/Fort Worth (DFW), Kansas City, Little Rock, Memphis, St. Louis, Tulsa and other regional destinations in the early 1980s as Frontier ended their respective flights with Skyways operating Nord 262 turboprops on some services in addition to the Metroliner propjets. Skyways was then merged into Air Midwest in 1985 and Air Midwest soon began a series of code share relationships with several major airlines. Flights to Kansas City began operating as Eastern Express on behalf of Eastern Airlines in 1986 and were then switched to Braniff Express on behalf of Braniff (1983-1990) in 1988. The Braniff Express service ended in late 1989 when Braniff ceased operations. New service to St. Louis began operating in 1985 as Ozark Midwest on behalf of Ozark Airlines. Ozark was then acquired and merged into Trans World Airlines (TWA) in 1986 and the Ozark Midwest flights then began operating as Trans World Express In the fall of 1991, Trans World Express service into the airport was being operated by Trans States Airlines with four nonstop British Aerospace BAe Jetstream 31 commuter propjet flights a day from St. Louis. By 1994, Trans World Express was no longer serving Fort Smith.

Metroflight Airlines, a division of Metro Airlines, began service to Dallas/Ft. Worth and Fayetteville, AR in 1982 with Convair 580 turboprops. Metroflight would then become the first carrier to operate as American Eagle on behalf of American Airlines in late 1984.

Republic Airlines (1979-1986) began providing Republic Express service operated by Express Airlines I (now Endeavor Air) with nonstop flights to Memphis in 1985. In 1986, Republic was acquired and merged with Northwest Airlines with the Republic Express service then becoming Northwest Airlink. British Aerospace BAe Jetstream 31 and Saab 340 turboprops were first used and with service then upgraded to Canadair CRJ-200 regional jets in the mid 2000s. Northwest Airlines then merged with Delta Air lines in 2010 and the Memphis flights continued as Delta Connection until 2012 when Delta shut down its Memphis hub operation inherited from Northwest.

Delta Connection operated by Rio Airways briefly operated flights to Dallas/Ft.Worth (DFW) using de Havilland Canada DHC-7 Dash 7 turboprops in late 1985 through early 1986. Atlantic Southeast Airlines (ASA) then resumed the Delta Connection service to DFW flying Embraer EMB-120 Brasilia turboprops from late 1986 until mid 2001. ASA also operated flights to Memphis in 1985 and 1986 using Embraer EMB 110 Bandeirantes. ASA began nonstop flights to Atlanta in mid 2007 using Canadair CRJ-200 regional jets. The Atlanta flights ended in mid 2009 but returned on June 7, 2012, and later upgraded with CRJ-700 and CRJ-900 jets. The Delta Connection service was also changed from ASA to Endeavor Air.

With the merger of Delta Air Lines and Northwest Airlines in 2010, the Northwest Airlink service to Memphis was changed to Delta Connection but was discontinued on September 5, 2012, after Delta shut down its Memphis hub operation inherited from Northwest. Delta Connection service nonstop to Atlanta was then increased to three daily flights.

American Eagle service to Dallas/Ft. Worth (DFW) was initially operated by Metroflight Airlines in late 1984 using Convair 580 turboprops. In 1987 the Convair 580s were retired and the DFW service was then flown with Saab 340 turboprops through the early 2000s in competition with the Delta Connection service to DFW. According to the Official Airline Guide (OAG), in the late spring of 1999 American Eagle and Delta Connection were operating a combined total of fourteen nonstop flights a day to Dallas/Fort Worth from the airport with American Eagle operating ten flights every weekday with Saab 340 aircraft and Delta Connection (flown by Atlantic Southeast Airlines) operating four daily flights with Embraer EMB-120 Brasilia aircraft. In late 2000 American Eagle introduced Embraer ERJ-145 regional jets, switching all flights to jets by 2003. However, some flights to DFW were later operated with ATR 72 turboprop aircraft on occasion in the early 2010s. By 2016, select flights began operating with larger Canadair CRJ-700 and CRJ-900 regional jets offering a first class cabin. American Eagle also provided nonstop flights to Nashville using Saab 340 turboprops for a brief time in 1993 and 1994 and service to St. Louis was provided in 2002 and 2003 operated by Trans States Airlines as AmericanConnection. The St. Louis service was flown with British Aerospace BAe Jetstream 41 turboprops.

On September 1, 2015, Delta Connection switched to using Canadair CRJ-700 regional jet aircraft featuring first class as well as coach seats. At the same time, flights to Atlanta were reduced from three to two flights per day. On January 5, 2016, even larger CRJ-900 jets were introduced. All Delta Connection service to Fort Smith ended in mid 2020 with the outbreak of the COVID-19 pandemic, leaving the airport served only by American Eagle with flights to DFW.

== Airline and destination ==
American Eagle connects Fort Smith Airport to Dallas Fort Worth International Airport.

Destinations map
Destinations from Fort Smith Regional Airport

== Statistics ==
Passenger boardings by year (from FAA data)

Year	Passengers	Percent change
1999	102,583	
2000	99,493	▼ -3.01%
2001	90,311	▼ -9.23%
2002	85,137	▼ -5.73%
2003	89,510	▲5.14%
2004	90,613	▲1.23%
2005	100,546	▲10.96%
2006	93,795	▼ -6.71%
2007	97,344	▲3.78%
2008	85,095	▼ -12.58%
2009	76,401	▼ -10.22%
2010	83,902	▲9.82%
2011	84,136	▲0.28%
2012	84,751	▲0.73%
2013	82,742	▼ -2.37%
2014	90,214	▲9.03%
2015	84,136	▼ -6.74%
2016	83,920	▼ -0.26%
2017	85,726	▲2.15%

=== Top destinations ===
Busiest domestic routes from FSM (August 2024 – July 2025)
Rank	City	Passengers
1	Dallas/Fort Worth, Texas	58,990

== See also ==
- List of airports in Arkansas
